= 9th Parliament of South Australia =

1878–1881 meeting of the South Australian Parliament

Ninth Parliament of South Australia
←	8th	10th	→
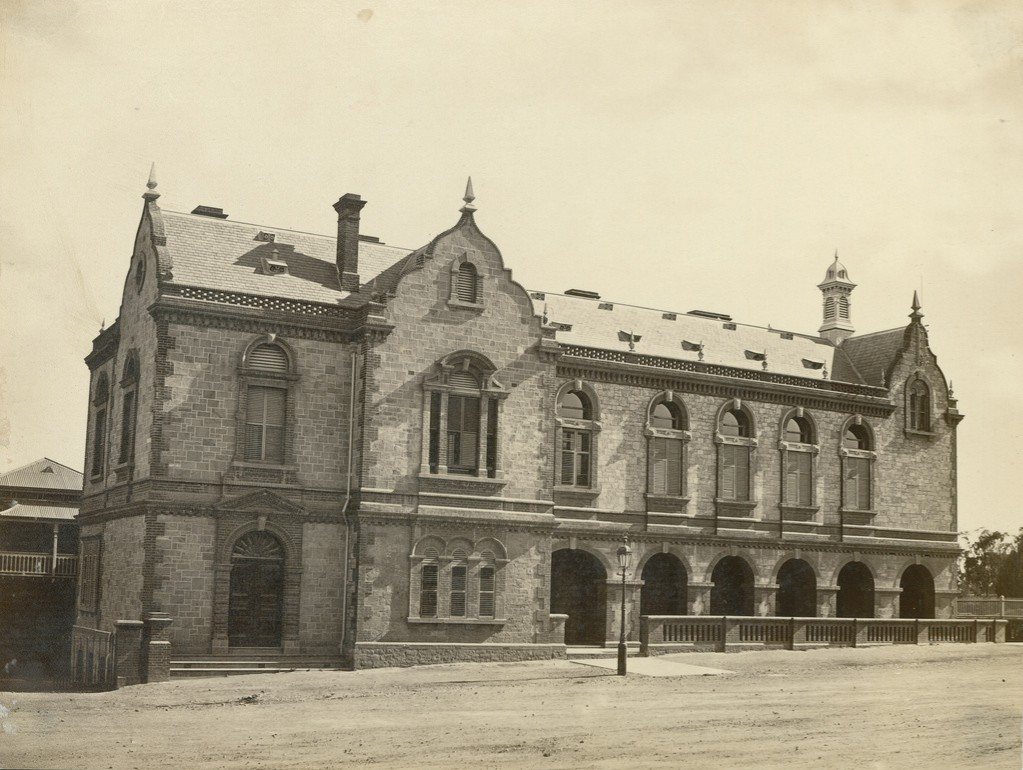
- Old Parliament House (1872)

Overview
- Legislative body: Parliament of South Australia
- Meeting place: Old Parliament House
- Term: 31 May 1878 – 19 March 1881
- Election: 2–30 April 1878

Legislative Council
- Members: 18
- President: William Milne

House of Assembly
- Members: 46
- Speaker: George Strickland Kingston

Sessions
- 1st: 31 May 1878 – 30 November 1878
- 2nd: 29 May 1879 – 25 October 1879
- 3rd: 27 May 1880 – 28 October 1880
- 4th: 4 January 1881 – 6 January 1881

The 9th Parliament of South Australia was a meeting of the legislative branch of the South Australian state government, composed of the South Australian Legislative Council and the South Australian House of Assembly.

== Leadership ==
Legislative Council

- President of the Legislative Council: William Milne
- Clerk of the Legislative Council: Francis Corbet Singleton
- Clerk's assistant and Sergeant-at-arms: Frederick Halcomb

House of Assembly

- Speaker of the House of Assembly: George Strickland Kingston
- Chairman of Committees: William Townsend
- Clerk of the House of Assembly: George William de la Poer Beresford
- Clerk's assistant and Sargeant-at-arms: Edwin Gordon Blackmore

== Membership ==
=== Legislative Council ===
Members elected in 1877 are marked with an asterisk (*).

▌ Henry Ayers
▌ Richard Chaffey Baker*
▌ Allan Campbell
▌ John Crozier*
▌ John Dunn, jun.
▌ Joseph Fisher
▌ Alexander Hay
▌ Thomas Hogarth
▌ John Hodgkiss*

▌ William Milne
▌ William Morgan*
▌ Alexander Borthwick Murray
▌ James Pearce*
▌ James Garden Ramsay*
▌ William Sandover
▌ Philip Santo
▌ Henry Scott
▌ Robert Alfred Tarlton

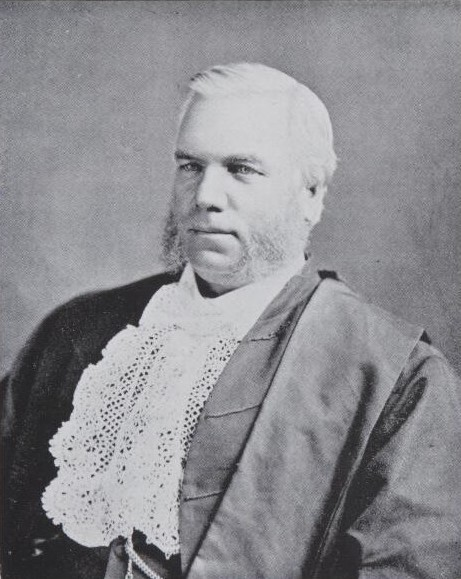
Legislative Council President
William Milne

=== House of Assembly ===
Albert

▌ Arthur Hardy
▌ Rudolph Wilhelm Emil Henning

Barossa

▌ Martin Peter Friedrich Basedow
▌ John William Downer

Burra

▌ Rowland Rees
▌ William Benjamin Rounsevell

East Adelaide

▌ John Cox Bray
▌ George Swan Fowler

East Torrens

▌ Thomas Playford
▌ Edwin Thomas Smith

Encounter Bay

▌ John Langdon Parsons
▌ William West-Erskine

Flinders

▌ Patrick Boyce Coglin
▌ Ebenezer Cooke
▌ William Ranson Mortlock

Gumeracha

▌ William Haines
▌ John Rounsevell

Light

▌ David Moody
▌ James Shannon
▌ James White

Mount Barker

▌ Albert Henry Landseer
▌ Francis William Stokes

Noarlunga

▌ Thomas Atkinson
▌ John Colton

North Adelaide

▌ Caleb Peacock

Onkaparinga

▌ William Henry Bundey
▌ Friedrich Edouard Heinrich Wulf Krichauff

Port Adelaide

▌ David Bower
▌ John Hart, jun.

Stanley

▌ George Strickland Kingston
▌ Charles Mann

Sturt

▌ Thomas King
▌ William Townsend

Victoria

▌ Lavington Glyde
▌ George Charles Hawker

Wallaroo

▌ Luke Lidiard Furner
▌ Charles Simeon Hare
▌ Robert Dalrymple Ross

West Adelaide

▌ Hugh Fraser
▌ William Knox Simms

West Torrens

▌ William Henry Bean
▌ William James Magarey

Wooroora

▌ John Bosworth
▌ Henry Edward Bright

Yatala

▌ Wentworth Cavenagh
▌ John Darling, sen.

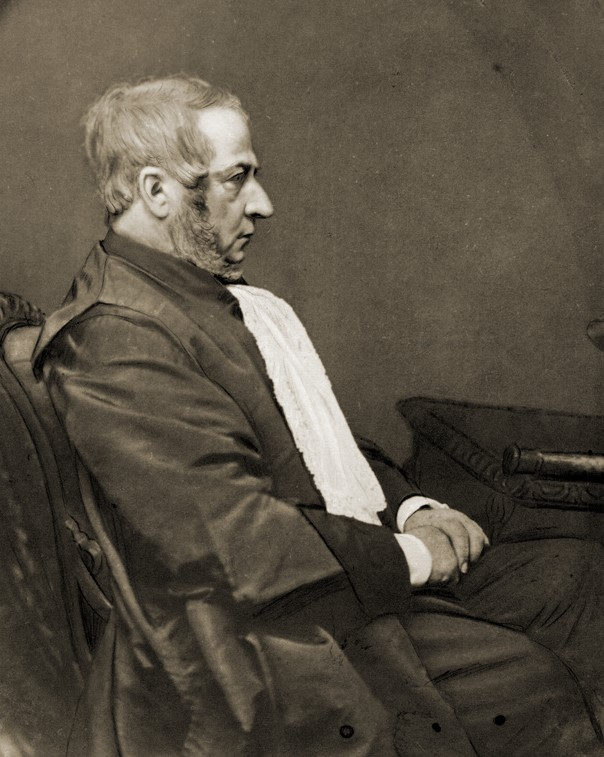
House of Assembly Speaker
George Strickland Kingston

== Changes of membership ==
=== Legislative Council ===
Before	Change		After	
Member	Type	Date	Date	Member
Thomas Elder	Resigned	1 August 1878	10 September 1878	John Hodgkiss
Thomas English	Resigned	1 August 1878	10 September 1878	Henry Scott
William Edward Everard	Failure to attend	1 August 1878	10 September 1878	Charles Burney Young
William Storrie	Resigned	1 August 1878	10 September 1878	Allan Campbell
Walter Duffield	Resigned	27 May 1880	7 July 1880	John Dunn, jun.
Henry Kent Hughes	Resigned	1 June 1880	7 July 1880	James Garden Ramsay
Charles Burney Young	Resigned	1 June 1880	7 July 1880	Alexander Borthwick Murray

=== House of Assembly ===
Seat	Before	Change		After	
Seat	Member	Type	Date	Date	Member
Light	Frank Skeffington Carroll	Resigned	31 May 1878	12 June 1878	David Moody
Noarlunga	John Carr	Resigned	29 August 1878	14 September 1878	Thomas Atkinson
Encounter Bay	James Penn Boucaut	Resigned	25 September 1878	10 October 1878	William West-Erskine
North Adelaide	Neville Blyth	Resigned	2 December 1878	16 December 1878	Caleb Peacock
Noarlunga	John Carr	Resigned	16 December 1879	6 January 1880	John Colton
Gumeracha	Ebenezer Ward	Resigned	5 April 1880	24 April 1880	John Rounsevell
Port Adelaide	William Quin	Resigned	17 July 1880	27 July 1880	John Hart, jun.
Stanley	George Strickland Kingston	Died	26 November 1880	Vacant	

== See also ==
- Members of the South Australian Legislative Council, 1877–1881
- Members of the South Australian House of Assembly, 1878–1881
