= Members of the South Australian House of Assembly, 1878–1881 =

This is a list of members of the ninth parliament of the South Australian House of Assembly, which sat from 1878 until April 1881. The members were elected at the 1878 election in May 1878.

Name	Electorate	Term in Office
Thomas Atkinson ^{[2]}	Noarlunga	1878–1887
M. P. F. Basedow	Barossa	1876–1890
William Henry Bean	West Torrens	1870–1871, 1878–1884
Neville Blyth ^{[4]}	North Adelaide	1860–1867, 1868–1870, 1871, 1877–1878
John Bosworth	Wooroora	1875–1884
James Boucaut ^{[3]}	Encounter Bay	1861–1862, 1865–1870, 1871–1878
David Bower	Port Adelaide	1865–1870, 1875–1887
John Cox Bray	East Adelaide	1871–1892
Henry Edward Bright	Wooroora	1875–1884
William Henry Bundey	Onkaparinga	1871–1875, 1878–1881
John Carr ^{[5]}	Noarlunga	1865–1879, 1881–1884
Frank Skeffington Carroll ^{[1]}	Light	1878
Wentworth Cavenagh	Yatala	1862–1875, 1875–1881
Patrick Boyce Coglin	Flinders	1860–1868, 1870–1871, 1875–1881, 1882–1887
John Colton ^{[2]} ^{[5]}	Noarlunga	1862–1870, 1875–1878, 1878, 1880–1887
Ebenezer Cooke	Flinders	1875–1882
John Darling	Yatala	1870–1871, 1876–1881, 1885–1887
John Downer	Barossa	1878–1901
George Fowler	East Adelaide	1878–1881
Hugh Fraser	West Adelaide	1868–1870, 1871–1876, 1878–1881
Luke Furner	Wallaroo	1878–1890
Lavington Glyde	Victoria	1857–1875, 1877–1884
William Haines	Gumeracha	1878–1884
Arthur Hardy	Albert	1875–1886, 1886–1887
Charles Simeon Hare	Wallaroo	1857, 1878–1881
John Hart, junior ^{[7]}	Port Adelaide	1880–1881
George Charles Hawker	Victoria	1858–1865, 1875–1883, 1884–1895
Rudolph Henning	Albert	1878–1885
Thomas King	Sturt	1875–1881, 1882–1885
George Strickland Kingston ^{[8]}	Stanley	1862–1881
Friedrich Krichauff	Onkaparinga	1857–1858, 1870–1882, 1884–1890
Albert Henry Landseer	Mount Barker	1875–1899
William James Magarey	West Torrens	1878–1881
Charles Mann	Stanley	1870–1881
David Moody ^{[1]}	Light	1878–1881, 1884–1887, 1896–1899
William Ranson Mortlock	Flinders	1878–1884
John Langdon Parsons	Encounter Bay	1878–1884, 1890–1893
Caleb Peacock ^{[4]}	North Adelaide	1878–1881
Thomas Playford	East Torrens	1868–1871, 1875–1887, 1887–1890, 1899–1901
Rowland Rees	Burra	1873–1881, 1882–1890
John Rounsevell ^{[6]}	Gumeracha	1865–1868, 1880–1881
Ben Rounsevell	Burra	1875–1890
James Shannon	Light	1878–1881
Francis William Stokes	Mount Barker	1878–1881
William Quin ^{[7]}	Port Adelaide	1870–1871, 1875–1880
Robert Dalrymple Ross	Wallaroo	1875–1887
William Knox Simms	West Adelaide	1868–1870, 1871–1876, 1878–1881
Edwin Thomas Smith	East Torrens	1871–1877, 1878–1893
William Townsend	Sturt	1857–1882
Ebenezer Ward ^{[6]}	Gumeracha	1870–1880, 1881–1890
William West-Erskine ^{[3]}	Encounter Bay	1878–1881
James White	Light	1871, 1875–1881

^{1} Light MHA Frank Skeffington Carroll resigned on 31 May 1878. David Moody won the resulting by-election on 12 June.
^{2} Noarlunga MHA John Colton resigned on 29 August 1878. Thomas Atkinson won the resulting by-election on 14 September.
^{3} Encounter Bay MHA James Boucaut resigned on 25 September 1878. William West-Erskine won the resulting by-election on 10 October.
^{4} North Adelaide MHA Neville Blyth resigned on 2 December 1878. Caleb Peacock won the resulting by-election on 16 December.
^{5} Noarlunga MHA John Carr resigned on 16 December 1879. John Colton won the resulting by-election on 6 January 1880.
^{6} Gumeracha MHA Ebenezer Ward resigned on 5 April 1880. John Rounsevell won the resulting by-election on 24 April.
^{7} Port Adelaide MHA William Quin resigned on 17 July 1880. John Hart, junior won the resulting by-election on 27 July.
^{8} Stanley MHA George Strickland Kingston died on 26 November 1880. No by-election was held due to the proximity of the 1881 general election.
