= Members of the South Australian House of Assembly, 1881–1884 =

This is a list of members of the tenth parliament of the South Australian House of Assembly, which sat from 1881 until March 1884. The members were elected at the 1881 state election in April 1881.

Name	Electorate	Term in Office
Thomas Atkinson	Noarlunga	1878–1887
Josiah Howell Bagster ^{[2]}	Yatala	1881–1890
M. P. F. Basedow	Barossa	1876–1890
William Henry Beaglehole	Wallaroo	1881–1884
William Henry Bean	West Torrens	1870–1871, 1878–1884
John Bosworth	Wooroora	1875–1884
David Bower	Port Adelaide	1865–1870, 1875–1887
John Cox Bray	East Adelaide	1871–1892
Henry Edward Bright	Wooroora	1875–1884
Frederick Estcourt Bucknall	West Torrens	1881–1887
John Carr	Onkaparinga	1865–1879, 1881–1884
Alfred Catt	Stanley	1881–1884
Patrick Boyce Coglin ^{[4]}	Flinders	1860–1868, 1870–1871, 1875–1881, 1882–1887
Jenkin Coles	Light	1875–1878, 1881–1911
John Colton	Noarlunga	1862–1870, 1875–1878, 1878, 1880–1887
Ebenezer Cooke ^{[4]}	Flinders	1875–1882
Robert Dixson	Light	1881–1884
Henry Edward Downer	Encounter Bay	1881–1896
John Downer	Barossa	1878–1901
George Fowler ^{[1]}	East Adelaide	1881
Hugh Fraser	West Adelaide	1868–1870, 1871–1876, 1878–1884
Luke Furner	Wallaroo	1878–1890
William Gilbert	Yatala	1881–1902
Lavington Glyde	Victoria	1857–1875, 1877–1884
William Haines	Gumeracha	1878–1884
Arthur Hardy	Albert	1875–1886, 1886–1887
George Charles Hawker ^{[6]}	Victoria	1858–1865, 1875–1883, 1884–1895
Rudolph Henning	Albert	1878–1885
James Henderson Howe	Stanley	1881–1884
Thomas Johnson ^{[1]}	East Adelaide	1881–1884
Thomas King ^{[5]}	Sturt	1875–1881, 1882–1885
Charles Kingston	West Adelaide	1881–1900
Friedrich Krichauff ^{[3]}	Onkaparinga	1857–1858, 1870–1882, 1884–1890
Albert Henry Landseer	Mount Barker	1875–1899
William Mattinson	Port Adelaide	1881–1893
William Ranson Mortlock	Flinders	1878–1884
Henry Vivian Moyle	Light	1881–1884
David Murray ^{[2]}	Yatala	1881
Simpson Newland	Encounter Bay	1881–1887
John Langdon Parsons	North Adelaide	1878–1884, 1890–1893
Thomas Playford	East Torrens	1868–1871, 1875–1887, 1887–1890, 1899–1901
Rowland Rees ^{[3]}	Onkaparinga	1873–1881, 1882–1890
Robert Dalrymple Ross	Wallaroo	1875–1887
Ben Rounsevell	Burra	1875–1890
Edwin Thomas Smith	East Torrens	1871–1877, 1878–1893
Lancelot Stirling	Mount Barker	1881–1887
Josiah Symon	Sturt	1881–1887
Andrew Tennant	Flinders	1881–1887
Samuel Tomkinson	Gumeracha	1881–1884
William Townsend ^{[5]}	Sturt	1857–1882
Ebenezer Ward	Burra	1870–1880, 1881–1890
William Whinham ^{[6]}	Victoria	1883–1884

^{1} East Adelaide MHA George Fowler resigned on 7 June 1881. Thomas Johnson won the resulting by-election on 17 June.
^{2} Yatala MHA David Murray was unseated on 28 June 1881. He contested and won the resulting by-election, but resigned on 18 August. Josiah Howell Bagster won the resulting by-election on 6 September.
^{3} Onkaparinga MHA Friedrich Krichauff resigned on 22 May 1882. Rowland Rees won the resulting by-election on 15 June.
^{4} Flinders MHA Ebenezer Cooke resigned on 24 October 1882. Patrick Boyce Coglin won the resulting by-election on 1 December.
^{5} Sturt MHA William Townsend died on 25 October 1882. Thomas King was elected unopposed on 13 November.
^{6} Victoria MHA George Charles Hawker resigned on 11 May 1883. William Whinham won the resulting by-election on 15 June.
