= Members of the South Australian House of Assembly, 1884–1887 =

This is a list of members of the South Australian House of Assembly from 1884 to 1887, as elected at the 1884 colonial election:

Name	Electorate	Term of office
Thomas Atkinson	Noarlunga	1878–1887
John Bagot	Victoria	1884–1887
Josiah Howell Bagster	Yatala	1881–1890
M. P. F. Basedow	Barossa	1878–1901
William Henry Beaglehole	Yorke Peninsula	1881–1887
David Bews ^{[2]}	Wallaroo	1885–1891
David Bower	Port Adelaide	1865–1870, 1875–1887
John Cox Bray	East Adelaide	1871–1892
Frederick Estcourt Bucknall	West Torrens	1881–1887
Thomas Burgoyne	Newcastle	1884–1915
Robert Caldwell	Yorke Peninsula	1884–1902
John William Castine	Wooroora	1884–1902
Alfred Catt	Gladstone	1881–1906
John Cockburn	Burra	1884–1898
Patrick Boyce Coglin	Newcastle	1860–1868, 1870–1871, 1875–1881, 1882–1887
Jenkin Coles	Light	1875–1878, 1881–1911
Hon John Colton	Noarlunga	1862–1870, 1875–1878, 1878, 1880–1887
William Copley	Frome	1884–1887, 1896–1902
John Darling, senior ^{[3]}	Stanley	1870–1871, 1876–1881, 1885–1887
Henry Edward Downer	Encounter Bay	1881–1896
John Downer	Barossa	1878–1901
John Duncan	Wooroora	1871–1878, 1884–1890
Arthur Aloysius Fox	West Adelaide	1884–1887
Luke Furner	Wallaroo	1878–1890
William Gilbert	Yatala	1881–1906
Samuel Dening Glyde ^{[4]}	Sturt	1885–1887
Henry Allerdale Grainger ^{[2]}	Wallaroo	1884–1885, 1890–1901
George Dutton Green ^{[6]}	East Adelaide	1884–1886
Andrew Dods Handyside ^{[1]}	Albert	1885–1904
Arthur Hardy ^{[5]}	Albert	1875–1886, 1886–1887
Arthur Harvey	West Torrens	1884–1887
Edward William Hawker	Stanley	1884–1889, 1893–1886
Hon George Charles Hawker	North Adelaide	1858–1865, 1875–1883, 1884–1895
Rudolph Henning ^{[1]}	Albert	1878–1884
Robert Homburg	Gumeracha	1884–1905
James Henderson Howe	Gladstone	1881–1896
Frank Johnson	Onkaparinga	1884–1896
Thomas King ^{[4]}	Sturt	1876–1881, 1882–1885
Charles Kingston	West Adelaide	1881–1900
Friedrich Krichauff	Victoria	1857–1858, 1870–1882, 1884–1890
Albert Henry Landseer	Mount Barker	1875–1899
William Mattinson	Port Adelaide	1881–1890
John Miller ^{[3]}	Stanley	1884–1885, 1890–1893, 1890–1893, 1896–1902
David Moody	Light	1878–1881, 1884–1887, 1896–1899
John Moule	Flinders	1884–1896
Simpson Newland	Encounter Bay	1881–1887
Hon Thomas Playford	East Torrens	1868–1871, 1875–1894, 1899–1901
Rowland Rees	Onkaparinga	1873–1881, 1882–1890
Robert Dalrymple Ross	Gumeracha	1875–1887
Ben Rounsevell	Burra	1875–1893, 1899–1906
Theodor Scherk ^{[6]}	East Adelaide	1886–1905
Edwin Thomas Smith	East Torrens	1871–1877, 1878–1893
Edward Charles Stirling	North Adelaide	1884–1887
Lancelot Stirling	Mount Barker	1881–1887, 1888–1890
Josiah Symon	Sturt	1881–1887
Andrew Tennant	Flinders	1881–1887
Ebenezer Ward	Frome	1870–1880, 1881–1890

^{1} Albert MHA Rudolph Henning died on 24 November 1884. Andrew Dods Handyside won the resulting by-election on 5 January 1885.
^{2} Wallaroo MHA Henry Allerdale Grainger resigned on 19 January 1885. David Bews won the resulting by-election on 16 February.
^{3} Stanley MHA John Miller resigned on 20 April 1885. John Darling, senior won the resulting by-election on 15 May.
^{4} Sturt MHA Thomas King resigned on 6 July 1885. Samuel Dening Glyde won the resulting by-election on 17 July.
^{5} Albert MHA Arthur Hardy resigned on 8 February 1886. He recontested his seat and was elected unopposed on 9 March.
^{6} East Adelaide MHA George Dutton Green resigned on 15 May 1886. Theodor Scherk won the resulting by-election on 31 May.
