= Electoral results for the district of Onkaparinga =

This is a list of election results for the electoral district of Onkaparinga in South Australian elections.

== Members for Onkaparinga ==
First incarnation (1857–1902)
Member	Party	Term	Member	Party	Term
William Milne		1857–1868	William Dawes		1857–1857
William Milne		1857–1868	William Townsend		1857–1870
Thomas Playford II		1868–1871	William Townsend		1857–1870
Thomas Playford II		1868–1871	Friedrich Krichauff		1870–1882
William Bundey		1871–1875	Friedrich Krichauff		1870–1882
William Dunn		1875–1878	Friedrich Krichauff		1870–1882
William Bundey		1878–1881	Friedrich Krichauff		1870–1882
John Carr		1881–1884	Friedrich Krichauff		1870–1882
John Carr		1881–1884	Rowland Rees		1882–1890
Joseph Johnson		1884–1896	Rowland Rees		1882–1890
Joseph Johnson		1884–1896	Robert Caldwell	Defence League	1890–1896
Walter Duncan	National League	1896–1902	Robert Caldwell	National League	1896–1902

Second incarnation (1938–1970)
Member	Party	Term
Howard Shannon	Liberal and Country	1938–1968
Stan Evans	Liberal and Country	1968–1970

== Election results ==
=== Elections in the 1960s ===
1968 South Australian state election: Onkaparinga
Party	Candidate	Votes	%	±%
Liberal and Country	Stan Evans	4,228	57.6	+0.5
Labor	David Rhodes	2,356	32.1	−6.7
National	Robert Harper	759	10.3	+10.3
Total formal votes		7,343	98.1	−0.1
Informal votes		145	1.9	+0.1
Turnout		7,488	95.3	−0.5
Two-party-preferred result
Liberal and Country	Stan Evans	4,911	66.9	+7.8
Labor	David Rhodes	2,432	33.1	−7.8
Liberal and Country hold		Swing	+7.8	

1965 South Australian state election: Onkaparinga
Party	Candidate	Votes	%	±%
Liberal and Country	Howard Shannon	3,836	57.1	+0.7
Labor	Frank Staniford	2,608	38.8	−4.8
Social Credit	Harvey Burns	278	4.1	+4.1
Total formal votes		6,722	98.2	+2.4
Informal votes		122	1.8	−2.4
Turnout		6,844	95.8	0.0
Two-party-preferred result
Liberal and Country	Howard Shannon	3,975	59.1	+2.7
Labor	Frank Staniford	2,747	40.9	−2.7
Liberal and Country hold		Swing	+2.7	

1962 South Australian state election: Onkaparinga
Party	Candidate	Votes	%	±%
Liberal and Country	Howard Shannon	3,682	56.4	−6.9
Labor	Peter Staniford	2,846	43.6	+6.9
Total formal votes		6,528	98.8	+0.9
Informal votes		77	1.2	−0.9
Turnout		6,605	95.8	+1.2
Liberal and Country hold		Swing	−6.9	

=== Elections in the 1950s ===
1959 South Australian state election: Onkaparinga
Party	Candidate	Votes	%	±%
Liberal and Country	Howard Shannon	3,954	63.3	−6.8
Labor	Cyril Hasse	2,292	36.7	+36.7
Total formal votes		6,246	97.9	+2.2
Informal votes		135	2.1	−2.2
Turnout		6,381	94.6	+0.5
Liberal and Country hold		Swing	N/A	

1956 South Australian state election: Onkaparinga
Party	Candidate	Votes	%	±%
Liberal and Country	Howard Shannon	4,189	70.1	
Independent	Frank Rieck	1,786	29.9	
Total formal votes		5,975	95.7	
Informal votes		269	4.3	
Turnout		6,244	94.1	
Liberal and Country hold		Swing		

1953 South Australian state election: Onkaparinga
Party	Candidate	Votes	%	±%
Liberal and Country	Howard Shannon	4,266	57.0	−4.1
Labor	Frank Staniford	3,223	43.0	+4.1
Total formal votes		7,489	97.9	−0.7
Informal votes		160	2.1	+0.7
Turnout		7,649	95.7	+0.8
Liberal and Country hold		Swing	−4.1	

1950 South Australian state election: Onkaparinga
Party	Candidate	Votes	%	±%
Liberal and Country	Howard Shannon	4,530	61.1	+10.7
Labor	Frank Staniford	2,887	38.9	+5.1
Total formal votes		7,417	98.6	+0.7
Informal votes		107	1.4	−0.7
Turnout		7,524	94.9	−0.2
Liberal and Country hold		Swing	N/A	

=== Elections in the 1940s ===
1947 South Australian state election: Onkaparinga
Party	Candidate	Votes	%	±%
Liberal and Country	Howard Shannon	3,528	50.7	−3.2
Labor	Herbert Burnley	2,349	33.8	−12.3
Independent	Frank Halleday	1,082	15.5	+15.5
Total formal votes		6,959	97.9	+1.1
Informal votes		152	2.1	−1.1
Turnout		7,111	94.7	+5.8
Liberal and Country hold		Swing	N/A	

- Preferences were not distributed.

1944 South Australian state election: Onkaparinga
Party	Candidate	Votes	%	±%
Liberal and Country	Howard Shannon	3,270	53.9	+10.9
Labor	Cyril Hasse	2,792	46.1	+11.7
Total formal votes		6,062	96.8	−1.7
Informal votes		199	3.2	+1.7
Turnout		6,261	88.9	+26.1
Liberal and Country hold		Swing	+2.5	

1941 South Australian state election: Onkaparinga
Party	Candidate	Votes	%	±%
Liberal and Country	Howard Shannon	1,876	43.0	−1.0
Labor	Cyril Hasse	1,501	34.4	+11.2
Independent Labor	Frank Staniford	988	22.6	−10.3
Total formal votes		4,365	98.5	+0.1
Informal votes		65	1.5	−0.1
Turnout		4,430	62.8	−1.0
Two-party-preferred result
Liberal and Country	Howard Shannon	2,242	51.4	+0.2
Labor	Cyril Hasse	2,123	48.6	+48.6
Liberal and Country hold		Swing	+0.2	

=== Elections in the 1930s ===
1938 South Australian state election: Onkaparinga
Party	Candidate	Votes	%	±%
Liberal and Country	Howard Shannon	1,870	44.0	
Independent	Frank Staniford	1,396	32.9	
Labor	Tom Howard	984	23.2	
Total formal votes		4,250	98.4	
Informal votes		71	1.6	
Turnout		4,321	63.8	
Two-candidate-preferred result
Liberal and Country	Howard Shannon	2,175	51.2	
Independent	Frank Staniford	2,075	48.8	
Liberal and Country hold		Swing		
