= Krichauff =

Krichauff may refer to:

- Friedrich Krichauff (1824–1904), South Australian politician
- Friedrich C. Krichauff (1861–1954), Australian architect, philatelist and photographer, son of the above
- Krichauff Range southwest of Alice Springs in the Northern Territory containing Palm Valley (Northern Territory)
- Mount Mary, South Australia, a town named Krichauff until 1918
