= John Colton (politician) =

Australian politician

The Honourable Sir John Colton KCMG
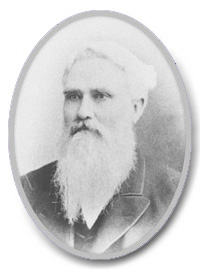

13th Premier of South Australia
- In office 6 June 1876 – 26 October 1877
- Monarch: Victoria
- Governor: Sir Anthony Musgrave
- Preceded by: James Boucaut
- Succeeded by: James Boucaut
- In office 16 June 1884 – 16 June 1885
- Monarch: Victoria
- Governor: Sir William Robinson
- Preceded by: John Cox Bray
- Succeeded by: John Downer

South Australian House of Assembly
- In office 1862–1870 Serving with Charles Hewett, John Carr
- Preceded by: Alexander Anderson
- Succeeded by: James Stewart
- Constituency: Noarlunga
- In office 1875–1878 Serving with John Carr
- Preceded by: Charles Myles
- Succeeded by: Thomas Atkinson
- Constituency: Noarlunga
- In office 1880–1887 Serving with Thomas Atkinson
- Preceded by: John Carr
- Succeeded by: Charles Dashwood
- Constituency: Noarlunga

Personal details
- Born: 23 September 1823 Devon, England, United Kingdom
- Died: 6 February 1902 (aged 78) Adelaide, South Australia, Australia
- Resting place: West Terrace Cemetery
- Spouse: Mary Colton (m. 1844; died in 1898)

Sir John Blackler Colton, KCMG (23 September 1823 – 6 February 1902) was an Australian politician, Premier of South Australia and philanthropist. His middle name, Blackler, was used only rarely, as on the birth certificate of his first son.

Colton, a son of farmer William Colton (died 10 July 1849) and his wife Elizabeth Colton, née Blackler (died 1888), was born in Devon, England. He arrived in South Australia in December 1839 aboard Duchess of Northumberland with his parents and siblings, who settled at McLaren Vale and started a vineyard.

Colton began to work as a saddler in Adelaide. His business eventually grow into a large ironmongery and saddlery business, John Colton and Company, which became Harrold, Colton & Company in 1889, then in 1911 Colton, Palmer and Preston Ltd, at the Topham Street corner of Currie Street, which firm survived as hardware merchants well into the latter half of the 20th century.

He gave £100 to start the work on the Pirie Street Wesleyan Church where he was an active member for over 50 years.

He was created KCMG on 1 January 1891. He died in Adelaide on 6 February 1902.

On 4 December 1844, Colton married Mary Cutting (December 1822 – 30 July 1898) who, as "Lady Colton", is remembered as a philanthropist and suffragist. Their family included:

- John William Colton (20 January 1848 – 26 December 1906), partner with brother Alfred, later managing director of Harrold, Colton & Co.
- Alfred Cutting Colton (27 August 1854 – 29 July 1919) married Eliza Bosisto "Lizzie" Stirling (died 19 March 1947), daughter of George Stirling and niece of Joseph Bosisto CMG (died 8 November 1898), on 10 February 1887, lived at Lorne, Victoria, then retired to Elsternwick, Victoria, where his brother-in-law, Dr. Robert A. Stirling (1855–1928), had a practice.

- John Stirling Colton (23 May 1888 – 12 April 1951) married Dorothy Isabel Hawkes in 1914

- John Blackler Colton (1 August 1918 – 21 December 1996)
- Dr. Robert Stirling Colton (13 August 1921 - 21 December 2015)

- Elizabeth Mary "Bessie" Colton (24 October 1856 – 9 September 1870)
- Edwin Blackler Colton (4 May 1859 – 19 August 1916), solicitor of Adelaide, married Emily Gardner Wallace (died 3 January 1922) in 1884.

- Edwin George Colton (1890–1959)
- Bessie Blackler Colton married Alfred Stanley Langsford in 1912

- Ellen Hannah Colton (18 October 1863 – 12 February 1946) lived with her father in Hackney
- Frank Septimus Colton (25 May 1865 – 22 August 1902) was a medical practitioner in England

Political offices
Preceded by Philip Santo	Commissioner of Public Works; 1868 – 1870	Succeeded by Friedrich Krichauff
Preceded by William Dixon Allott	Mayor of the Corporation of Adelaide; 1874 – 1875	Succeeded by Caleb Peacock
Preceded by James Boucaut	Premier of South Australia; 1876 – 1877	Succeeded by James Boucaut
Preceded by James Boucaut	Commissioner of Public Works; 1876 – 1877	Succeeded by George Hawker
New title	Leader of the Opposition of South Australia; 1884	Succeeded by John Bray
Preceded by John Bray	Premier of South Australia; 1884 – 1885	Succeeded by John Downer
Preceded by James Ramsay	Chief Secretary of South Australia; 1884 – 1885	Succeeded by John Spence
South Australian House of Assembly
Preceded by Alexander Anderson	Member for Noarlunga; 1862 – 1870; Served alongside: Charles Hewett, John Carr	Succeeded by James Stewart
Preceded by Charles Myles	Member for Noarlunga; 1875 – 1878; Served alongside: John Carr	Succeeded by Thomas Atkinson
Preceded by John Carr	Member for Noarlunga; 1880 – 1887; Served alongside: Thomas Atkinson	Succeeded by Charles Dashwood
