= CanDo4Kids =

Australian charitable organization

- Founded: 1874
- Founder: William Townsend
- Type: Charity
- Location: 28 King George Ave, Hove
- Region served: South Australia
- Product: Services for children with sensory impairment
- Volunteers: 100+
- Website: www.cando4kids.com.au

CanDo4Kids is South Australia's oldest charity and works directly with children and young adults with sensory impairment disabilities, such as blindness and deafness, by focusing on what children "can do" and helping them to reach their full potential. Formerly known as Townsend House, the charity was founded in 1874 by William Townsend MP.

== History ==
Founded in 1874 as the South Australian Institution for the Blind, Deaf and Dumb (Inc.) by William Townsend, later changed to Townsend House, the charity opened its doors to five blind and two deaf students. William Townsend, the founder, after two terms in office as Mayor of Adelaide, set about fulfilling his ambition to establish a "Blind Asylum in the City of Adelaide". He was the chairman of its committee from 1875 until his death in 1882. Funds were raised by public subscription.

The building, located in the southern suburb of Hove, was commissioned by Townsend and designed in Gothic style by noted architect (also a mayor of Adelaide and parliamentarian) Thomas English. It was built in 1878 as the South Australian Institution for the Blind, Deaf and Dumb, Brighton, later renamed Townsend House. It is heritage-listed on the South Australian Heritage Register.

In 1970, the Townsend House Schools for Deaf and Blind Children were divided into a state government-run day school called South Australian Schools for Deaf and Blind Children, and a residential home called Townsend House for Deaf and Blind Children. The home was run by a private committee, and provided residential care for vision and hearing impaired children until 1999, when it closed.

In 2019, the Cora Barclay Centre merged with Can:Do 4Kids, Townsend House, continuing their services as a specialist program.

== Services ==
CanDo4Kids offers services to children and young adults including: speech pathology, early intervention, occupational therapy, family support, assistive technology, youth work, recreation auditory processing disorder intervention, auditory verbal therapy, mentor programs and counselling. All services are provided free of charge to children and young adults who are deaf, blind or who have a sensory impairment. CanDo4Kids works with children and young adults up to 25 years and their families.

Funding for CanDo4Kids is raised through sponsorship, donations, bequests, grants, lotteries, events and property development, with 30 per cent of overall funding coming from the Government. CanDo4Kids is an affiliated with Charity Direct, an organisation that promotes ethical fund raising behaviour.

CanDo4Kids has clinics at Colonnades Shopping Centre at Noarlunga and on Port Road at Hindmarsh.
