= John Henry Sexton =

John Henry Sexton OBE (2 July 1863 – 3 November 1954) was a Baptist minister in South Australia.

== History ==
Sexton was born in Callington, the fourth son of Alfred Sexton and his wife Grace James née Bray. He grew up in Mount Barker and studied for the Baptist ministry at Union College, was ordained in 1885, and served as minister to Baptist churches in Georgetown, Gumeracha, Morphett Vale and Gawler.

He was secretary (1900–03) and president (1906) of the South Australian Baptist Union, and edited the Southern Baptist from 1905 to 1907. He was for 23 years secretary of the Adelaide chapter of the British and Foreign Bible Society and editor of their monthly The Bible in the World from 1909 to 1919. He was secretary of the Aborigines' Friends' Association from 1911 to 1942 and its president for several years. He arranged to have the gospels translated and printed in Aranda. He was actively involved with Adelaide City Mission for over 25 years and its president in 1926. He was a member of the State Advisory Council for Aborigines from 1918 to 1940 and on occasion served as secretary. In 1935 he served as a member of a board called by the Commonwealth to investigate the treatment of Aborigines at Hermannsburg Mission and the killing of Yokunnunna, an unarmed Aboriginal man, at Ayers Rock (now Uluru) by Constable W. McKinnon.

== Bibliography ==
- Sexton, J. H. (editor) The Classic of the Soul: an anthology (Adelaide, 1937)
- Sexton, J. H. Australian Aborigines (Adelaide, 1944)
- Sexton, J. H. Aboriginal Intelligence (Adelaide, 1946)

== Family ==
He married Mary Annie Playford (died 1956), the eldest daughter of Thomas Playford, on 30 June 1886. Their daughter Annie served as a nurse in Egypt during World War I.

== Recognition ==
He was appointed an OBE in January 1946.

== Sources ==
- Suzanne Edgar, 'Sexton, John Henry (1863–1954)', Australian Dictionary of Biography, National Centre of Biography, Australian National University, https://adb.anu.edu.au/biography/sexton-john-henry-8390/text14709, published in hardcopy 1988, accessed online 16 October 2014.
