= Peacock and Son =

Australian tanning and woolbrokering business (1790 - 1874)

Peacock & Son was a tanning and wool-brokering business in the early days of South Australia. Three members of the family were notable public figures: William Peacock (c. 1790 – 20 January 1874) was a successful businessman and one of the colony's first parliamentarians. His eldest son Joseph Peacock carried on the family business and was a member of parliament. His youngest son Caleb Peacock was a member of parliament and Mayor of Adelaide from 1875 to 1877, the first such born in the Colony.

William and family sailed for South Australia on the "Glenalvon", a ship he chartered, arriving at Holdfast Bay on 28 December 1838.

== William Peacock ==
William commenced his tannery business in Grenfell Street in 1839, with a fellmongering facility at Adam Street, Hindmarsh. He had moved by 1868 to Thebarton His was the first major tannery, ahead of both Dench & Co. and G. W. Bean, and the first to export acacia bark. The Adam Street property was sold in July 1903 to fellmongers Michell and Sons.

He was one of the original investors in the South Australian Mining Association, which developed the lucrative Burra copper mines between 1845 and 1865, and a director (disqualified in 1860 through absence greater than 6 months but subsequently re-elected)

=== Religion and education ===
He was associated with the Congregational Church in Freeman Street (now part of Gawler Place), funded the building of the chapel in Ebenezer Place (off Rundle Street east). He then helped organise the building of the Hindmarsh Square Congregational Church, which later became an office and orchestral studio for ABC Radio. He was closely associated with J. L. Young and his Adelaide Educational Institution, which for many years used rooms at the Ebenezer Place and Freeman Street chapels.

=== Politics ===
He served on the Adelaide City Council as Councillor and Alderman from 1842

He won the seat of Noarlunga in the South Australian Legislative Council (then the only House) against Major O'Halloran in 1851 which he held to 1856. He won a Legislative Council seat in 1861, which he held until 1869 when he retired, a few days before parliament was prorogued.

== Family ==
William Peacock married Elizabeth Everett, daughter of Joseph, another Bermondsey fellmonger, in 1816. He was widowed between 1834 and 1836 and remarried in 1836. His new wife was Maria Groch who accompanied him on the "Glenalvon" with their infant son William. The older children in the party were from his first marriage to Elizabeth.

- Elizabeth Peacock (c. 1817 – 11 August 1870) married James Dobson. She died at East Richmond, Victoria.
- Miriam Peacock (c. 1821 – 6 April 1901) married James Weston. She died at St Kilda, Victoria.
- Joseph Peacock (c. 1825 – 25 July 1867)
- Sarah Peacock (c. 1828 – 11 December 1843) drowned in River Torrens at her father's Walkerville farm.
- Henry Peacock (c. 1833 – 10 April 1868) Co-manager of tannery and bark mill. Left for rest cure early 1863 but died shortly after return. His widow Agnes married Thomas O'Neil on 9 December 1895.
- Ebenezer Peacock (c. 1834 – 27 April 1868) married Jane Kerr Garie on 11 June 1863 lived at Gawler South then Prospect.

His children with Maria (c. 1802 – 13 February 1869) were:

- William Peacock (c. 1838 – 19 July 1861) died in Emerald Hill, Victoria of consumption (tuberculosis). His widow, Jane Emily Peacock, married S. J. Jones on 7 March 1863.
- Caleb Peacock (1841 – 17 February 1896)

Their home for many years was "Palm House" in Hackney on what was known as "Peacock Hill", now St Peter's College. He married Mary Ann Evans (1821–1908) on 15 June 1871. She was to marry Carrington Smedley on 4 March 1875.

== Sources ==
- Loyau, George E. (1883) Representative men of South Australia, p. 192
- Morrison, W. Frederic (1890) Aldine history of South Australia, illustrated, vol. 2, p. 779
- Pascoe, J. J. (1901) Caleb Peacock, p. 522 in History of Adelaide and vicinity : with a general sketch of the province of South Australia and biographies of representative men
- The late Mr. Caleb Peacock, Adelaide observer, 4 April 1896, p. 14, col. d A founder of the Executor, Trust and Agency Company of S.A. Details of C. Peacock's will are given.
- The Mayor of Adelaide, Illustrated Adelaide news, January 1876, p. 7, 9 Tanner and fellmonger. Mayor of Adelaide.
- "Mr Caleb Peacock". The Advertiser. 18 February 1896. p. 4 – via Trove.
- "Farewell breakfast to ex-Mayor (Mr. C. Peacock)". South Australian Register. 12 December 1877. p. 5 – via Trove.
