= Mount Victor Station =

Pastoral lease in South Australia

Coordinates: 32.05762°S 139.61898°E

Location in South Australia

Mount Victor Station is a pastoral lease currently operating as a sheep station located about 115 kilometres (71 mi) east of Hawker and 175 kilometres (109 mi) west of Broken Hill in the state of South Australia,

The property and neighbouring Plumbago Station occupy an area of 494,000 acres (199,915 ha) of arid country, which has a mean annual rainfall of 8 inches (203 mm).

The property is stocked with 32,000 Poll Merino sheep and 120 cattle.

The property was established by George Charles Hawker prior to 1859, one of many holdings passed onto his children following his death in 1895. Mount Victor was one of many properties owned by Michael Seymour Hawker along with Bungaree, Partacoona, McCoy's Well and Sturt's Meadow.

The station was acquired in 1971 by H.G. MacLachlan of the Jumbuck Pastoral Company, who still owned it in 2025.

The land occupying the extent of the Mount Victor pastoral lease was gazetted as a locality by the government of South Australia on 26 April 2013 under the name "Mount Victor Station". The term "station" was added to prevent duplication of the locality name within Australia.

== See also ==
- List of ranches and stations
