= Charles Myles =

Australian politician (1837–1903)

Charles Hegan Myles (30 December 1837 – 23 February 1903) was a politician in the British colony of South Australia.

== History ==
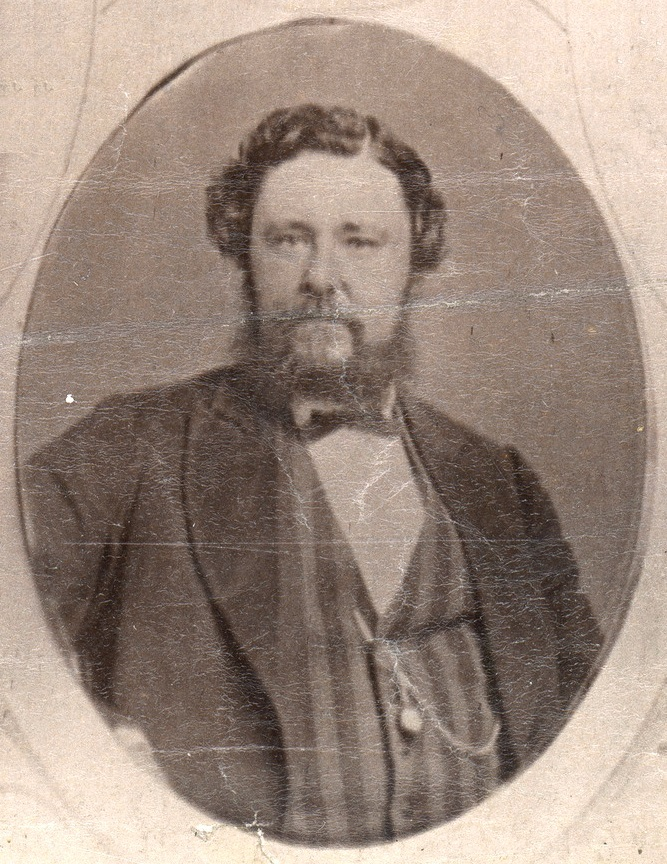
Charles Hegan Myles (1837–1903), South Australian politician

Charles was born the youngest son of Samuel Myles MD (c. 1797 – 3 February 1866) and his second wife Eliza, née Hegan (c. 1807 – 17 February 1861), who emigrated with their families on the Sir Charles Forbes to South Australia, arriving in June 1839, and settled at Morphett Vale.

He was elected to the seat of Noarlunga in the South Australian House of Assembly and served from December 1871 to February 1875, succeeding James Stewart as a colleague of John Carr. He served as Electoral Registrar until forced by illness to resign, a few weeks before his death.

He later acted as Returning Officer for the same constituency. He was Chairman of the local council for several years, and helped found the Morphett Vale Institute.

== Family ==
Samuel Myles MD (c. 1797 – 3 February 1866) was married to Hannah Witter (c. 1796 – ). He married again, to Eliza Hegan (c. 1807 – 17 February 1861), emigrated to South Australia. Children of both wives included:

- Jane Myles (21 December 1816 – 7 November 1879) married organ builder and music seller Samuel Marshall (15 Jun 1803 – 28 March 1879). She was his second wife.

- John Myles Marshall (c. 1853 – 6 May 1877) married Martha Elizabeth Beare (c. 1852 – 25 December 1941) in 1876. Their children included:

- Jeanie Elizabeth Myles Marshall (28 June 1877 – 25 December 1909), at one stage a promising contralto.

Martha married again in 1880, to William John Kennedy, and had three more daughters and a son.

- Hannah Witter Myles ( – ) married saddler William Parker Allworth on 7 March 1844.

- Joseph Witter Allworth (1847–1904?1905?)
- John Noble Allworth
- Edward Richard Allworth
- Francis Charles Allworth (1853–1900)
- William Frederick Allworth (1851–1925)

- John Burgess Myles (c. 1821 – 23 February 1898) married Margaret McNeilly (c. 1825 – 8 June 1902).

- Arthur Myles ( – 11 July 1913)

- Samuel Myles (c. 1824 – 22 June 1906), a brother, married Jane Ewins (c. 1827 – 2 December 1901) on 20 April 1854

- eldest daughter Jane married Peter Anderson on 19 February 1885
- youngest daughter Hannah Witter Myles ( – 28 June 1897)

- Sophia Myles (c. 1828 – 12 May 1914)
- Maria Ann Myles (c. 1831 – 20 February 1915)
- Charles Hegan Myles (30 December 1837 – 23 February 1903) married Louisa Harriet Baillie Brodie (c. November 1832 – 23 June 1930), daughter of Alexander Brodie, on 20 June 1861.

- Lilla Hegan Myles (22 November 1863 – c. 25 December 1917) married W. E. Bagshaw (c. 1867 – 14 April 1954). He married again, to Irene Purfoy Tapley on 17 September 1932.
- eldest son Alexander Henry Hegan Myles (18 December 1868 – 3 December 1944) married Agnes Maude Lindsay ( – ) of Bathurst on 22 February 1919
- May Myles ( – )
- youngest daughter Louisa Marcella Maud Myles ( – 31 January 1940) married J. B. Barrowman on 1 September 1914

Their home was "Melton Mowbray", Morphett Vale.
