= Alexander Anderson (Australian politician) =

Australian politician

Alexander Anderson (c. 1811 – 1 December 1862) was a politician and hotelier in the young colony of South Australia.

== History ==
Anderson emigrated from London with his wife Catherine Frances, née Creighton, with children Joseph and Rosina (born at sea), on the Recovery arriving in South Australia on 19 September 1839. They immediately settled in Morphett Vale, keeping the Emu Hotel from 1839 to 1845. He was chairman of the Anti-Dray and Land Tax League in 1850. He was a member of the local council and its chairman around 1855.

He was member for Noarlunga in the South Australian House of Assembly 23 March 1860 – 16 November 1862 and died shortly after.

He was the centre of controversy after he was appointed to the Morphett Vale Board of Magistrates. It was widely reported that four Magistrates resigned in protest at his appointment, though strongly refuted by Anderson. He was at one time sued for, or convicted of, falsely imprisoning two men, Lloyd and Thirtell. He was prosecuted for the theft of two trees (variously reported as "palms" and "limes") from a neighbour. He was acquitted on the basis of alibis, which may have been tainted. He was certainly capable of being irrationally abusive to those he considered his enemies. These matters were all brought up at a public meeting which bore all the features of a kangaroo court, led by J. B. Myles, James Clark, O'Halloran and Dr. Montgomery. Moderating voices of W. Thomson, M. Taggart and Head were given short shrift. Anderson subsequently resigned his commission as Justice of the Peace.

His residence was "The Lodge", Morphett Vale

== Family ==
Anderson married Catherine Frances Creighton (c. 1818 – 2 March 1885) before emigrating to Australia. Their children included:

- Joseph Anderson ( – )
- Rosina Anderson (1839–) married George Donaldson, Jr. (c. 1831 – 2 March 1897) on 14 May 1863. He was Stipendiary Magistrate in Darwin, Northern Territory then Magistrate in Port Augusta.
- Emily Anderson ( – 29 August 1876)
- Jane Sheppard Anderson ( – 10 May 1887) may have been licensee of Dover Castle Hotel, North Adelaide
- Alexander Anderson (c. 1850 – 21 December 1889) may have been licensee of Sir John Barleycorn Hotel, Rundle Street.
- Constance Kate Anderson (13 September 1849 – 16 January 1907) married William Bain (1846–) on 23 August 1877 and lived at "The Lodge", Morphett Vale. She married again, to William Arthur Duval (7 February 1856 – 10 October 1916) on 2 January 1890. Their son Clive Duval (28 February 1891 – 14 February 1965) lived at "The Lodge" and married in 1916.

Not to be confused with his contemporary, the probably unrelated Alexander Anderson (c. 1810 – 26 April 1884) who lived at "Mossgiel" or "Mosgiel", Morphett Vale and was married to Barbara Anderson (c. 1811 – 8 December 1891)
