= John Carr (Australian politician, born 1819) =

Australian politician (1819–1913)

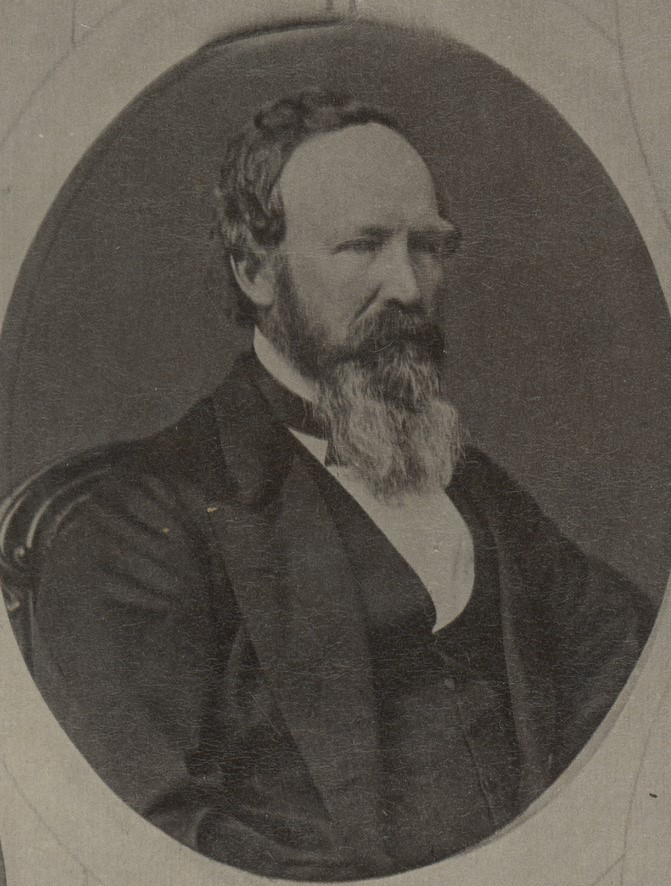

John Carr (21 September 1819 – 10 February 1913) was a politician in colonial South Australia.

== History ==
Carr was born at Conisbrough, Yorkshire, a son of William Carr, who had a small farm at Styrrup 10 miles (16 km) from Doncaster, and was educated at Tickhill in that county, and worked on his father's farm. He emigrated to Australia in 1862 on the Merchant Prince, which brought him to Melbourne, and thence to Adelaide on the Admella, arriving on 17 July 1859 (a month later the Admella was wrecked with tragic consequences). He purchased 200 acres (81 ha) at Dashwood's Gully, where he grew wheat and ran dairy cattle for 20 years, then sold up to live at Blackwood. Seventeen years later he took up 1,000 square miles (2,600 km^{2}) on the Nullarbor Plain with Capt. Delissa and several others. They sold up later at a small profit, and Carr moved to Port Adelaide, where he served on the boards of several companies, and local chairman of the Corporation of South Australian Copper Mines. He was for several years chairman of the District Council of Onkaparinga.

== Politics ==
He was a candidate for one of the two Noarlunga seats in the South Australian House of Assembly in 1865, and came second (John Colton 348, John Carr 303, William Trimmer 261) but due to a technicality, votes cast at Happy Valley could not be included, putting Carr in third place. Trimmer resigned immediately on taking his seat in favour of Carr, who represented Noarlunga until December 1879, and subsequently sat for Onkaparinga from April 1881 until April 1884. He was Commissioner of Public Works in the John Hart Ministry from May 1870 to November 1871; and from the latter date till January 1872 in the Government of Arthur Blyth. He was Commissioner of Crown Lands under John Colton's Premiership, from June 1876 to October 1877. In the next year he received the Queen's permission to bear the title of "Honourable" within the colony.

== Other interests ==
He was a very active worker for the Methodist Church, and was involved with the congregations of Clarendon, Kangarilla, Meadows, Blackwood, Ironbank, Upper Sturt, Aldgate and elsewhere, and represented Clarendon in the Methodist Conference. He was active in the cause of total abstinence.

== Family ==
He was married to Anna (ca.1823 – 7 March 1891) and married again, to the widow Jane Hilditch (ca.1837 – January 1911) on 14 October 1891. Their last homes were at Boyle Street, Prospect and Blackwood. He appears to have had no children.

Political offices
Preceded by Friedrich Krichauff	Commissioner of Public Works; 30 May 1870 – 22 Jan 1872	Succeeded by James Ramsay
South Australian House of Assembly
Previous: Charles Hewett	Member for Noarlunga; 1865–1879; Served alongside: John Colton, James Stewart, Charles Myles, Thomas Atkinson	Succeeded by John Colton
Previous: William Bundey	Member for Onkaparinga; 1881–1884; Served alongside: Friedrich Krichauff, Rowland Rees	Succeeded by Joseph Johnson
