= Friedrich C. Krichauff =

Friedrich Charles Krichauff

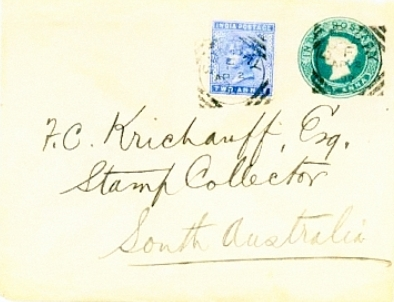
An 1897 letter from India, addressed just to F.C. Krichauff, Esq, Stamp Collector, South Australia.

Friedrich Charles Krichauff (27 June 1861 – 25 March 1954) was an Australian architect, philatelist and amateur photographer.

== Family ==
Krichauff was born 27 June 1861 at Bugle Ranges, South Australia. His father was Friedrich Eduard Heinrich Wulf Krichauff (1824–1904), a South Australian parliamentarian and his mother was Dorothea Sophia Arivolina Fischer. Krichauff married Elizabeth Alice Gemmell on 3 March 1898 at Long Valley, north of Strathalbyn, South Australia. In his later years he lived in Portrush Road, Toorak Gardens. He died on 25 March 1954 at Adelaide, South Australia.

== Architecture ==
As an architect, Krichauff designed the Hazelwood Park rotunda, among other buildings.

== Philately ==
Krichauff was a specialist in the postage stamps of New Zealand and the Australian states, particularly South Australia. His name was placed on the Roll of Distinguished Philatelists in 1932. He did not sign in person as he was unable to attend the ceremony. Krichauff was elected a fellow of the Royal Philatelic Society London in 1941.

== Photography ==
Krichauff was a founding member in 1885 of the South Australian Amateur Photographic Society, also Secretary and Treasurer. In 1886, he was awarded a bronze medal at the London Colonial and Indian Exhibition and in 1887 he was awarded the First Order of Merit for photographic work shown at the Adelaide Jubilee International Exhibition. In June 1949 Krichauff was interviewed in Australasian Photo-Review where he stated that he never sold his photographs and only ever gave them away.

Several albums of his photographs are in the State Library of South Australia.

== Selected publications ==
- The Postage Stamps of South Australia. Philatelic Society of South Australia, Adelaide. N.R. James Ed. (contributor)
