= William Quin =

Australian politician

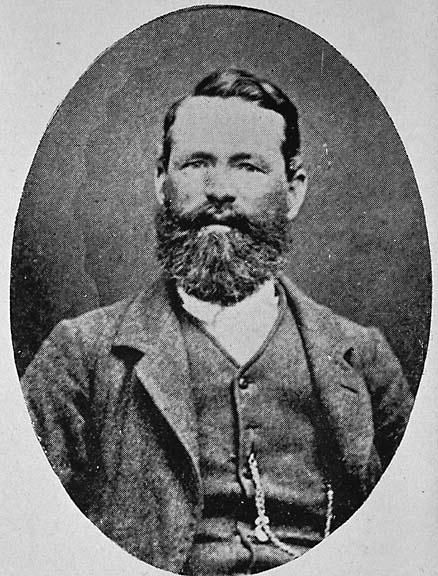

Member of the South Australian House of Assembly for Port Adelaide
- In office April 1870 – December 1871, February 1875 – July 1880

Personal details
- Died: 13 November 1880
- Occupation: plasterer

William Quin (c. 1836 – 13 November 1880) was a plasterer and politician in the colony of South Australia, regarded as the first "worker" to hold such a position.

William Quin was a plasterer with the firm of Webber & Quin of Queenstown in 1857, occasional writer of letters to the editor and well known and respected around the Port, though not so in Wallaroo which was then part of the electoral district of Port Adelaide.

He was a leading member of Oddfellows.

He was member of the House of Assembly for Port Adelaide from April 1870 to December 1871 and February 1875 to July 1880. He was forced to retire due to ill health and died of tuberculosis. He was buried in the Woodville Cemetery.

Parliament of South Australia
Preceded by John Duncan	Member for Port Adelaide; 1875–1880	Succeeded by John Hart, Jr.
