= William Whinham =

Australian businessman and politician

William Whinham (1842–1925) was an Australian businessman and politician.

Around 1876, he founded the township, later suburb, of Ovingham.

He purchased Benara station, near Mount Gambier, around 1874 and sold it to Captain R. Gardiner six years later at a substantial profit.

He was elected to the House of Assembly seat of Victoria made vacant by the resignation of George Charles Hawker in June 1883. He was not a candidate for the general election in 1884.

In 1883, he and W. McEllister embarked on an ambitious speculation in the wheat market. They offered farmers 10s. per acre advance on half the farmer's wheat crop. This amounted to some £16,500 on 33,000 acres. Anticipating cornering the market, they purchased 5000 bales of wheat bags and chartered 20 or 30 clipper ships to carry the harvest to Europe and employed 44 inspectors to assess the qualifying farms. The outcome, rather than a profit, was a loss of some £14,000.

With the death of his brother Robert in 1884, William Whinham assumed management of the North Adelaide Grammar School, but after a few years returned to his business interests. He lived a very secluded life in his latter years; he had married late in life and his wife predeceased him by about 12 years. He had a hip injury and could only get around with the aid of crutches.
