= John Hart Jr. =

Australian politician

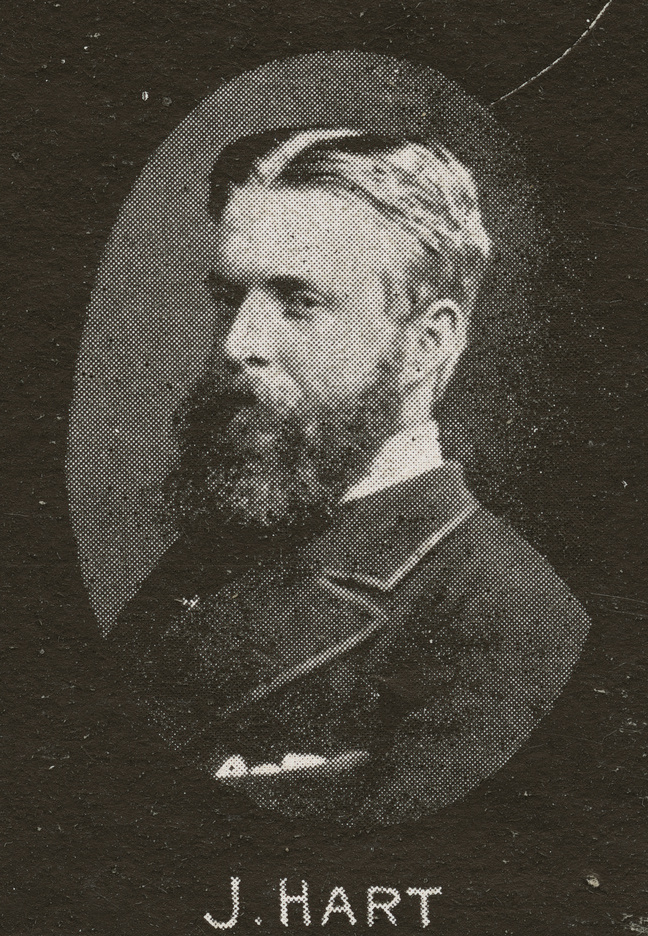

Member of the South Australian Legislative Assembly for Port Adelaide
- In office 27 July 1880 – 7 Apr 1881
- Preceded by: William Quin
- Succeeded by: William Mattinson

Personal details
- Born: 16 July 1848 Woodside, South Australia
- Died: 15 August 1881 (aged 33) Glen Osmond, South Australia
- Parent(s): John Hart Sr. Mary Gillmor Kathrine Todd
- Occupation: Merchant
- Known for: President of Port Adelaide Football Club 1870-1879

John Hart Jr. (1848–1881) was a member of the South Australian House of Assembly for the Electoral district of Port Adelaide from 27 July 1880 to 7 Apr 1881.

Hart was the eldest son and third of seven children of Captain John Hart who was three times premier of South Australia between 1865 and 1871. He was senior member of J. Hart & Co., the business founded by his father.

In 1870, Hart became the inaugural president of the Port Adelaide Football Club, and "Buck's Flat", in his father's Glanville Hall Estate property, was the club's home and site of many matches in its early years. The club's inaugural secretary was the longtime manager of Hart's Mill, William Leicester. Hart was also president of the Port Adelaide Rifle Club and a prominent member of the Adelaide Hunt Club, serving as Master of Fox Hounds for the years 1873 and 1876.

He was elected to the seat of Port Adelaide in the House of Assembly in July 1880, to fill a vacancy caused by a resignation of William Quin due to ill health and who died 4 months later. Hart did not seek re-election at the end of his term the following year due to his own ill health. He died on 15 August 1881 at Wooton Lea, Glen Osmond.

== Family ==
He married Emily Lavinia Finch (died 5 October 1939) on 8 August 1877. Their children included:

- John Heriot Hart (25 January 1880 – 1 March 1929) was a prominent musician.
- Marian Henthorn Hart (15 June 1881 – 18 May 1942)

Parliament of South Australia
Preceded by William Quin	Member for Port Adelaide; 1880–1881	Succeeded by William Mattinson
