= Caleb Peacock =

Politician in South Australia (1841–1896)

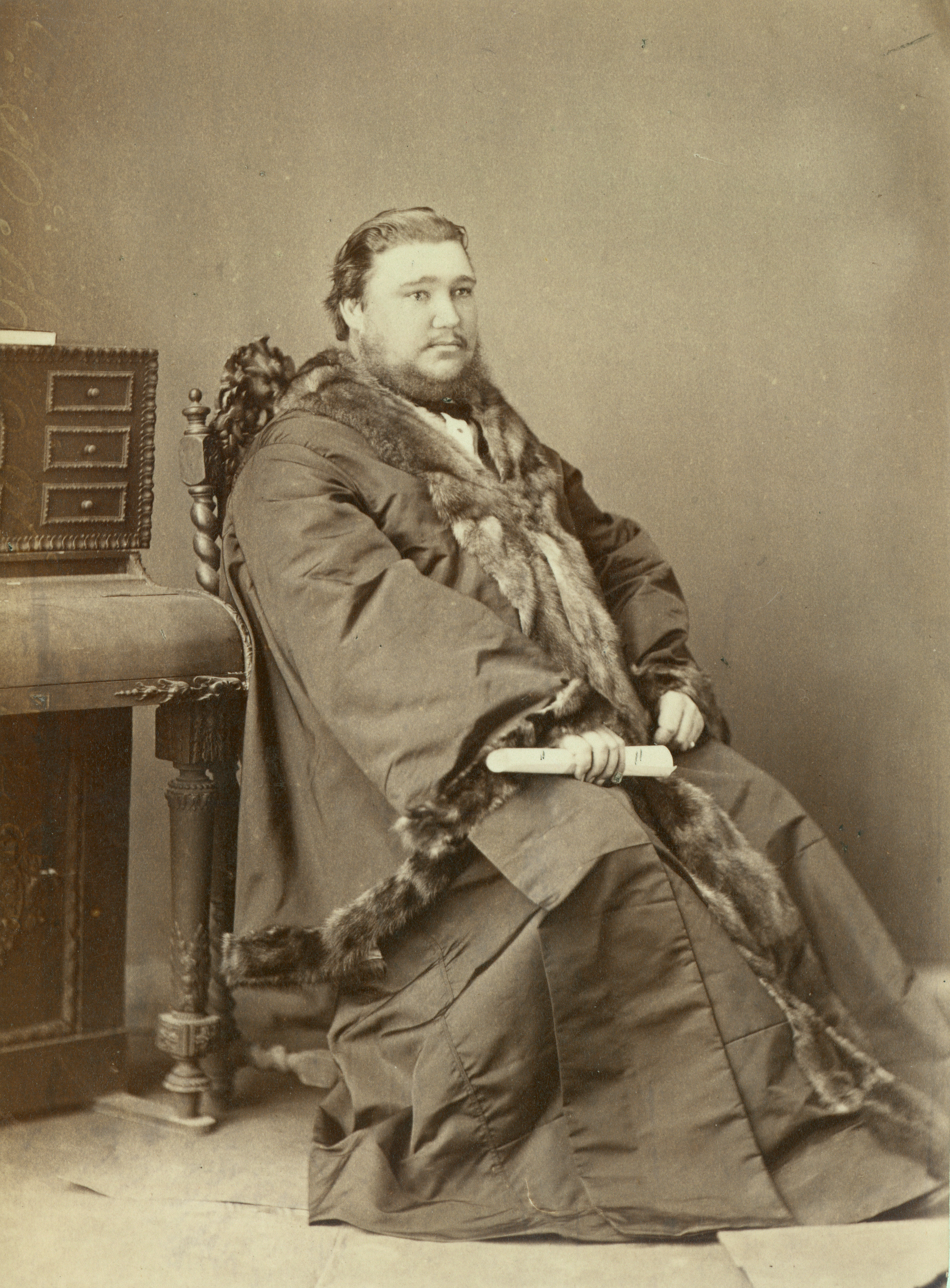
Caleb Peacock when Mayor of Adelaide c. 1875–1877

Caleb Peacock (13 April 1841 – 17 February 1896) was educated at Adelaide Educational Institution, one of J. L. Young's two first students.

He was for some time manager of Peacock and Son.

He was associated with Beeby and Dunstan, millers and was an agent in Blanchetown.

- He was appointed Justice of the Peace in 1871.
- He was a trustee of the Savings Bank of South Australia.
- and a director of the National Bank of Australasia, from 1873 to 1893 (when the bank was liquidated), much of this time as chairman.
- He was a prominent member of the Chamber of Commerce (including stints as chairman and vice-chairman).
- He was Mayor of Adelaide 1875–1877.
- He was elected to the South Australian House of Assembly seat of North Adelaide in 1878 in a by-election forced by the resignation of Neville Blyth, and retired with the dissolution of 1881.

He died at his home "Keston" on Barton Terrace, North Adelaide, from heat apoplexy (heat stroke), on 17 February 1896.

== Personal ==
In 1885 he was elected President of the Adelaide Rowing Club, a position he held until his death.
