= Hugh Fraser (Australian politician) =

Australian politician

Hugh Fraser (1837 – 10 November 1900) was a politician of Scottish birth in the Colony of South Australia.

== History ==
Hugh Fraser was born in Inverness, Scotland, a son of John Fraser (died 20 October 1882), emigrated to South Australia with four brothers in 1863, and went to work at the slate mines in Mintaro. He later started his own slate quarry, then moved to Adelaide to act as manager for the Delabole Slate Company, which he took over when it got into financial difficulties. He reversed the company's fortunes and later ran a marble masonry business on the corner of Franklin and Bentham Streets.

== Politics ==
Fraser won the seat of West Adelaide in 1878 as a Protectionist, with W. K. Simms as his junior colleague. He was successful again in 1881, with C. C. Kingston as his running mate. This partnership again went to the polls in 1887, but Fraser was defeated by A. A. Fox, his stronger showing being overcome by a splitting of votes. He subsequently stood for the seat of Stanley, but failed; attributable said some, to the enmity the Press felt when the "wily, obstinate, pertinacious, rugged, blunt, eloquent Scotchman" spoke in favour of removing postage privileges that newspapers then enjoyed.

"Hugh Fraser's parliamentary monument was the imposition of postage upon newspapers; it brought the State a revenue of £8,000 a year straightaway; and it proved a veritable parliamentary tombstone to the author, for he never recovered from the unpopularity it won for him. and his public career was thenceforward dead"

== Other interests ==
Fraser had a deep love for Scottish culture. He could recite much of Burns by heart, was one of the founders of the South Australian Caledonian Society, and held the office of Chief 1891–1892. He was a prominent Freemason and Oddfellow, and a member of other friendly societies. He was appointed justice of the peace.

== Family ==
Hugh married Jane Ann Ferrie (ca.1840 – 13 April 1892). He married again, to Mary Drummond on 1 February 1896. Children by his first marriage included

- eldest daughter Isabella Fraser (died 22 May 1894) married James Rowett on 19 December 1886
- fourth daughter Lizzie Ferrie Fraser married John Binnie on 21 November 1894
- youngest daughter Sarah Fraser married Robert Binnie on 25 November 1891.

Hugh died at his home "Maesbury House" in Chapel Street, Kensington.
