= Ebenezer Cooke (politician) =

Australian politician

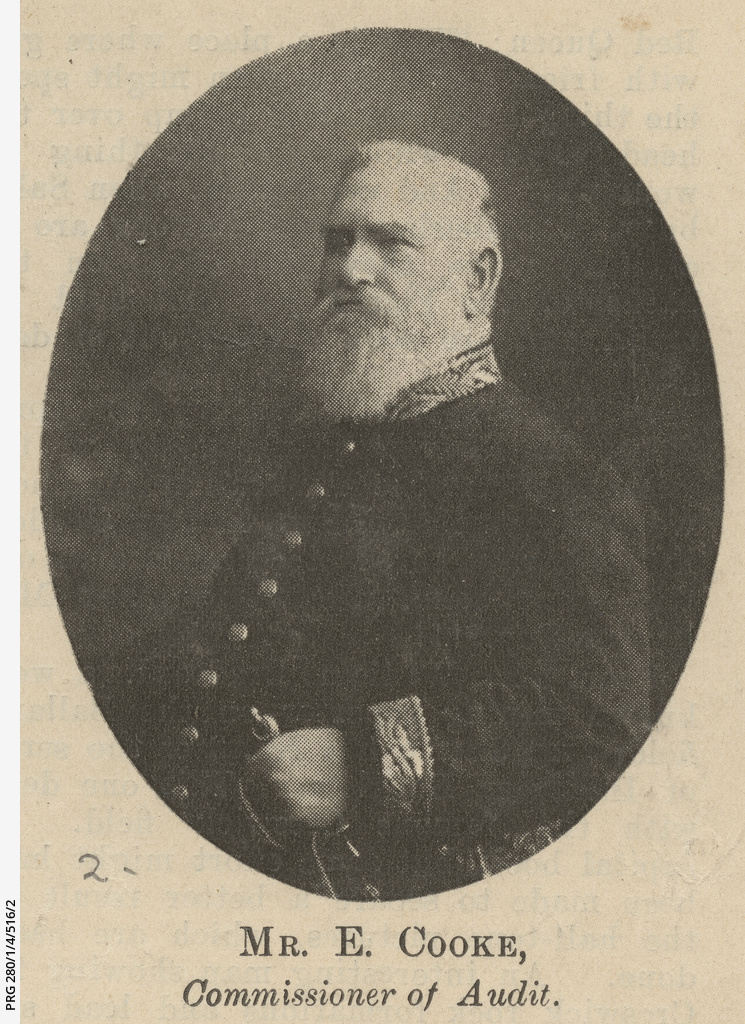

Member of the South Australian Parliament for Flinders
- In office 1875–1882

Personal details
- Born: 14 May 1832 London, England
- Died: 7 May 1907 (aged 74) Adelaide, Australia
- Spouse: Eliza Peyton (m. 1859)
- Occupation: accountant

Ebenezer Cooke (14 May 1832 – 7 May 1907) was a South Australian accountant, Member of Parliament and Commissioner of Audit.

== Early life ==
Cooke was born in London, England, where his eldest brother, the Rev. John Cooke, was a noted Egyptologist and co-founder of The Freeman, a Baptist weekly newspaper.

== Accountant ==
In 1863 Ebenezer Cooke was sent out to the colony of South Australia by the English and Australian Copper Company as accountant for their smelting works in St Vincent Street, Port Adelaide. He took on role of superintendent then (on the death of general manager James Hamilton in 1871) was officially appointed to that position, which he held until "headhunted" by the Public Service in 1882. He was replaced by Frederick Ireland who, like Cooke, was promoted from the post of Accountant.

== Politics ==
On 1 March 1875 he was elected to the South Australian House of Assembly as member for Flinders, encompassing northern towns such as Port Augusta and Port Pirie with colleagues Patrick Boyce Coglin and John Williams. In 1878 he was re-elected for the same district, with William Ranson Mortlock taking the place of Williams. In 1881 Cooke was once more successful, his fellow-members being Mortlock and A. Tennant.

"During these years Mr. Cooke was a most regular attendant in the House, and he developed a reputation as an analyst of budget speeches. He was not fond of debating ordinary subjects, but when matters were before the House in which financial questions were involved Mr. Cooke was listened to with the utmost attention by all parties, because he used to study his subjects so fully and seemed to be able to fathom every point involved. His attention to detail became almost wearisome at times, but it all went to prove the true value of the man as a student of financial subjects."

On 31 July 1879 he was appointed chairman of the Royal Commission on Finance, which ran for nearly three years. The Commission's final report, dated 2 May 1882, recommended the creation of an Audit Office with two Commissioners of Audit. These recommendations were accepted with Cooke and Alfred Heath appointed to the top jobs. This necessitated his retirement from parliament; he resigned on 24 October 1882, though he did retain the position of attorney for the English and Australian Copper Company and directorship of the related English Copper Company.

== Government Auditor ==
He took up the post in February 1883. He and Heath (who had been appointed to counterbalance Cooke's suspected political loyalties) worked harmoniously and efficiently, but when Heath retired (or was relieved of his position), Cooke continued in the role alone with no obvious reduction in the Office's effectiveness. He

"possessed uncommon gifts as a mathematician, a vein of dry humour, he was well informed on all current topics, with a particularly good knowledge of the political history of the State and of Australia centrally and, tbough he at one time took a prominent part in public affairs, and discussed with avidity questioned before Parliament, after his induction to the control of the Audit Office he 'knew no politics'"

Under his leadership, the Audit Office evolved from an investigative body to a powerful arm of Government, giving advice, and to some extent control, outside its original remit. He supported the formation of the Public Service Association in 1884, and was its first president.

== Family ==
He was the brother of Rev. J. Hunt Cooke of Richmond, Surrey. He married Eliza Peyton (née Ogden) in London in 1859. Their children were

- Mary (c. 1860 – 21 June 1944), who was appointed deaconess and worked for 33 years as a missionary sister in India for the Cambridge Society for the Propagation of the Gospel
- E(benezer) Frank Cooke ( – 6 July 1924) was educated at Mr. Martin's school at Port Adelaide, Thomas Caterer's Norwood Grammar School and St Peter's College was accountant for Henry Scott, followed his father as accountant and acting manager of the English and Australian Copper Company, then for the Chaffey Brothers. He briefly worked in Western Australia, Queensland and New South Wales before settling down in Camberwell, Victoria, working for H. C. Stezl, shipping agents of Melbourne. He married Ada Grace Rosetta Collins of Bendigo on 8 March 1893 and had two daughters. He was a keen mathematician and the author of The A.B.C. Perpetual Calendar (1920).
- W(illiam) Ernest Cooke (25 July 1863 – 1947) was educated at Thomas Caterer's Norwood Grammar School and admitted to Adelaide University under-age, won the South Australian scholarship of £200 in 1882 and on graduating was assistant to Sir Charles Todd, assistant Government Astronomer for South Australia, then from 1896 Government Astronomer of Western Australia (where he founded the new Observatory) until he was offered a similar post in Sydney. He was frustrated by the advent of World War I in his ambition to make this a world-class facility, and retired to South Australia in 1920. He was a Fellow of the Theosophical Society. He married Jessie Elizabeth Greayer (died 1944) at the Adelaide Unitarian Christian Church, Wakefield Street, Adelaide on 30 June 1887.

After the death of his wife, he married Rosa Phillipps, a sister of W. Herbert Phillipps on 8 May 1866. Their children were

- J(ohn) Herbert Cooke (3 August 1867 – 30 July 1943) was a mayor of Unley and Member of the South Australian Legislative Council.
- (Rosa) Eveline (1873 – ) married Alfred Charles Dancker of Fremantle on 15 December 1900; they settled in Claremont, Western Australia, but he died around 25 August 1918 and Eveline promptly changed her (and her son's) surname to Hunt Cooke by deed poll.
- Florence Emmeline Cooke, Mus. Bac. (25 November 1874 – 11 December 1953) was a noted violinist and teacher of music. She wrote a march "Soldiers of Australia". The Florence Cooke Violin Prize, awarded by Elder Conservatorium was named for her.

== Personal ==
Cooke was musically talented, and in his younger days organized classical concerts. He was an authority on art, and an enthusiast for photograph tinting. He was an active member of the Anglican church and an active and high-ranking Freemason.

On 24 April 1907 Mr. Cooke was granted eight months' leave of absence on full pay on account of his poor health, and replaced by P. Whitington. Two weeks later he died, aged 73, in his home on South Terrace, Adelaide.

== Sources ==
Hawker, G. N., "Cooke, Ebenezer (1832–1907)", Australian Dictionary of Biography, National Centre of Biography, Australian National University, Australian Dictionary of Biography, accessed 10 November 2011.
