= Thomas King (Australian politician) =

Australian politician

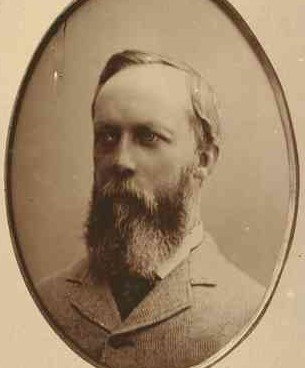
- Thomas King as Minister for Education

Member of the South Australian House of Assembly for Sturt
- In office 10 April 1876 – 7 April 1881 Serving with William Townsend
- Preceded by: Samuel Way
- Succeeded by: Josiah Symon
- In office 13 November 1882 – 6 July 1885 Serving with Josiah Symon
- Preceded by: William Townsend
- Succeeded by: Samuel Dening Glyde

Minister for Education
- In office 7 October 1878 – 10 March 1881
- Premier: William Morgan
- Preceded by: Rowland Rees
- Succeeded by: M. P. F. Basedow

Personal details
- Born: 14 February 1833 Stony Stratford, Buckinghamshire, England
- Died: 20 November 1886 (aged 53) Bayswater, England

Thomas King (14 February 1833 – 20 November 1886) was a politician in colonial South Australia, Minister of Education from 1878 to 1881.

King was born at Stony Stratford, Buckinghamshire, England on 14 February 1833. He was the son of William King who migrated to Adelaide in 1852. He was for many years a member of the firm of Barrow & King, proprietors of the South Australian Advertiser, Chronicle, and Express. King represented Sturt in the South Australian House of Assembly from 10 April 1876 to 7 April 1881, and from 13 November 1882 to 6 July 1885, and was Minister of Education in the William Morgan Ministry from 7 October 1878 to 10 March 1881.

Having come to England as one of the South Australian commissioners to the Colonial and Indian Exhibition held at South Kensington in 1886, he died at Bayswater, England, on 20 November of that year.

== See also ==
- Hundred of King

South Australian House of Assembly
Preceded by Samuel Way	Member for Sturt; 1876–1881; Served alongside: William Townsend	Succeeded by Josiah Symon
Preceded by William Townsend	Member for Sturt; 1882–1885; Served alongside: Josiah Symon	Succeeded by Samuel Dening Glyde
Political offices
Preceded by Rowland Rees	Minister for Education in South Australia; 1878–1881	Succeeded by Martin Basedow
