= William Townsend (mayor) =

Australian politician

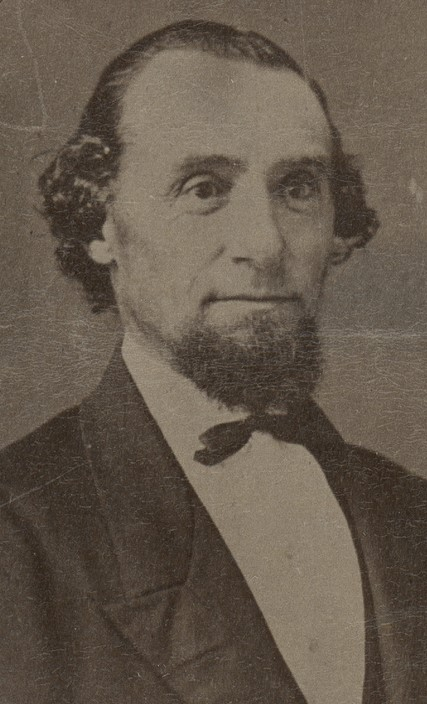
Townsend ca. 1872

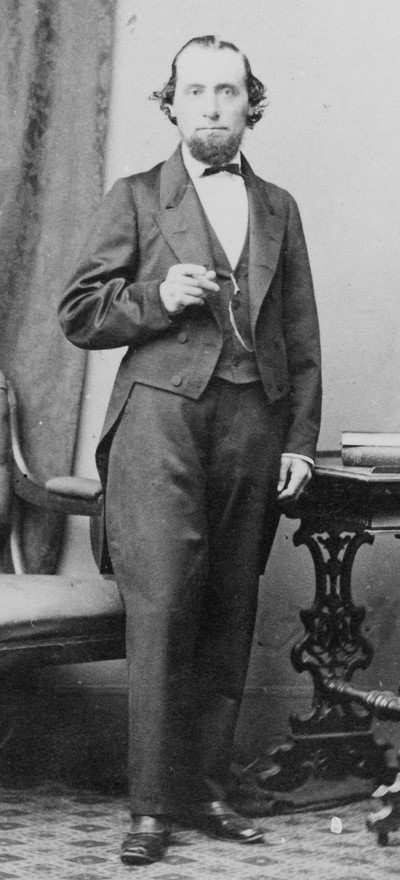
Mayor of Adelaide ca. 1865

William Townsend (1821 – 25 October 1882) was a leading auctioneer, Mayor of Adelaide from 1864 to 1866, and a South Australian politician. In 1874 he established an institution for deaf and blind children which was named Townsend House.

== Early years ==
Townsend was born in the London Borough of Southwark, and worked assisting his brother, a potato salesman, and subsequently as a clerk. He married Emma Slade at St Pancras on 25 December 1852, and soon after set sail for Adelaide. He, his wife and child arrived in South Australia aboard the Dutch ship Fop Smit on 2 August 1853. Emma died soon after arrival. He subsequently married Jane Hooper.

== Migration to South Australia ==
At first he was employed as a boot salesman, and subsequently opened a business as a boot-maker. On the advice of F.J. Botting, he became an auctioneer, gaining experience with several Adelaide firms. He helped found Townsend, Botting & Kay with F. J. Botting and William Kay. Ultimately he became a leading auctioneer, forming his own business, "Townsend and Son".

== Political career ==
A fluent and forcible speaker, he became a popular public lecturer, and a lay preacher of the Congregational Church. He was interested in the formation of responsible government in South Australia from its beginnings, and helped frame the 1855 Constitution. He unsuccessfully stood in the colony's first election, but entered the South Australian Legislative Assembly in a by-election on 23 December 1857 for the seat of Onkaparinga. He held that seat until 1870, when he was elected member for Sturt, which he held until his death. He was Commissioner of Public Works in the 11-day Francis Dutton Ministry of July 1863, and Commissioner of Crown Lands and immigration in the 16-day John Hart Ministry of September–October 1868. As Commissioner of Crown Lands in the Blyth Ministry from November 1871 to January 1872, he initiated a survey of the Northern Territory. He was acting Speaker in the assembly from 1872 until his death, and in 1876 he succeeded John Carr as Chairman of Committees in the Assembly, a position he also held until his death on 25 October 1882.

== Public offices and philanthropy ==
Townsend served two terms as mayor of Adelaide in 1864–66, and was mayor of Unley in 1878–81.

"Townsend House" was founded in 1874 by Townsend who, after two terms in office as Mayor of Adelaide, set about fulfilling his ambition to establish a "Blind Asylum in the City of Adelaide". Founded as the South Australian Institution for the Blind, Deaf and Dumb (Incorporated), the charity opened its doors to five blind and two deaf students, beginning a commitment that continues today under the name CanDo4Kids. Townsend was chairman of its committee from 1875 until his death in 1882.

== Personal ==
Townsend lived at "Waverley" in Lower Mitcham. Aged 61, he died of phthisis on 25 October 1882 at Mitcham, survived by his second wife, four daughters and three sons.

Political offices
Preceded by William Milne	Commissioner of Public Works; 4 Jul 1863 – 15 Jul 1863	Succeeded by Philip Santo
Parliament of South Australia
Preceded by William Dawes	Member for Onkaparinga; 1857–1870; Served alongside: William Milne, Thomas Playford II	Succeeded by Friedrich Krichauff
Preceded by Frederick Spicer	Member for Sturt; 1870–1882; Served alongside: John Lindsay, John Barrow, William Mair, Samuel Way, Thomas King, Josiah Symon	Succeeded by Thomas King
Political offices
Preceded by Samuel Goode	Mayor of the Corporation of Adelaide; 1864–1866	Succeeded by Henry Fuller
