= James Stewart (South Australian politician) =

Australian politician

James Stewart (c. 1842 – 2 March 1879) was a pastoralist and politician in the colony of South Australia.

Alexander Stewart (c. 1799 – 15 January 1883), arrived in South Australia on the Duchess of Northumberland in December 1839 with his wife, two stepsons and two stepdaughters and settled on a property on the Mosquito Plains, near Naracoorte. Nearby properties were taken up around the same time by John Stewart, for whom Stewart's Ranges near Naracoorte was named, and Charles Stewart of Avenue Plains (near Lucindale, 40 km from Naracoorte). It is not certain what relation Charles and John were to Alexander. Some time before 1870 Alexander took over a cattle property "Woodlands" at Morphett Vale.

James Stewart, was born in the South East of South Australia, and grew up at "Moy Hall" on the Mosquito Plains. He was educated at Portland, Victoria, St. Peter's College, and Whinham's Grammar School in North Adelaide. He married and took over a sheep station in Victoria, which he later sold at a substantial profit, and retired to "Hackham House", Hackham, and was a member of the Adelaide Hunt Club.

James Stewart was MHA for Noarlunga from March 1870 – December 1871. He failed in his bid to be re-elected.

He died at Hackham House after a long illness. He married twice; he had a daughter and three sons by his first wife and a daughter by his second.

== Family ==
James Stewart's father, Alexander Stewart (c. 1799–1883), arrived in South Australia in 1839 with his wife, who before their marriage was Mrs. Hay, two stepsons, and two step-daughters. Alexander Stewart married again, on 1 July 1863, to the widow Mrs. Jane Hay ( – c. 1884). Alexander Stewart was then stepfather of Daniel Hay, William Hay, and four step-daughters, the youngest being Jessie Hay, who married Ronald McDonald on 11 November 1857. He died at "Woodlands." His family included:

- Charles Stewart (c. 1811 – 16 January 1885) married socialite Mary Ann (c. 1844 – 20 June 1913), and lived at Payneham House, Henry Street, Payneham. Their children included:

- Gordon Stewart ( – 28 August 1898)
- Nellie Stewart ( – 18 June 1913) married lawyer Andrew Harriot Henning (1863 – 2 December 1947) on 11 June 1896, and lived in Western Australia. He married again in 1946, to Frances Rosa (surname needed) (1889–1970).
Charles may have been stepson or brother of Alexander; his wife Mary Ann called Percy and Reginald her nephews. It is possible he was the Charles Stewart of Avenue Plains, who had children by a previous marriage (including fourth daughter Isabella who married William Anderson on 17 September 1869) and married a second time, to Mary Wright on 18 June 1864; they had a son on 21 March 1865, daughter on 26 June 1867.

- James Stewart (c. 1842–1879), "only son of Alexander Stewart" married Eliza "Lilla" Waite ( – 7 January 1875), sixth daughter of Thomas Waite, on 18 November 1863. He married again, to Jean Leighton on 22 December 1875.

- (Alexander) Percy Stewart (c. 1865 – 29 July 1895) died at Payneham House.
- Charlotte Maud Stewart (c. 1867 – 23 September 1893)
- James Gordon Stewart (8 May 1870 – ) wife, Helena Ethel Stewart
- Reginald Stewart (7 October 1871 – 28 April 1906) married Violet Sybil Gayer in early September 1896 and lived in Portsea, Victoria.
- Jeannie Hilda Leighton Stewart (22 November 1877 – 20 July 1918) married William Anderson on 20 March 1899
