= Thomas Playford II =

Australian politician (1837–1915)

The Honourable Thomas Playford
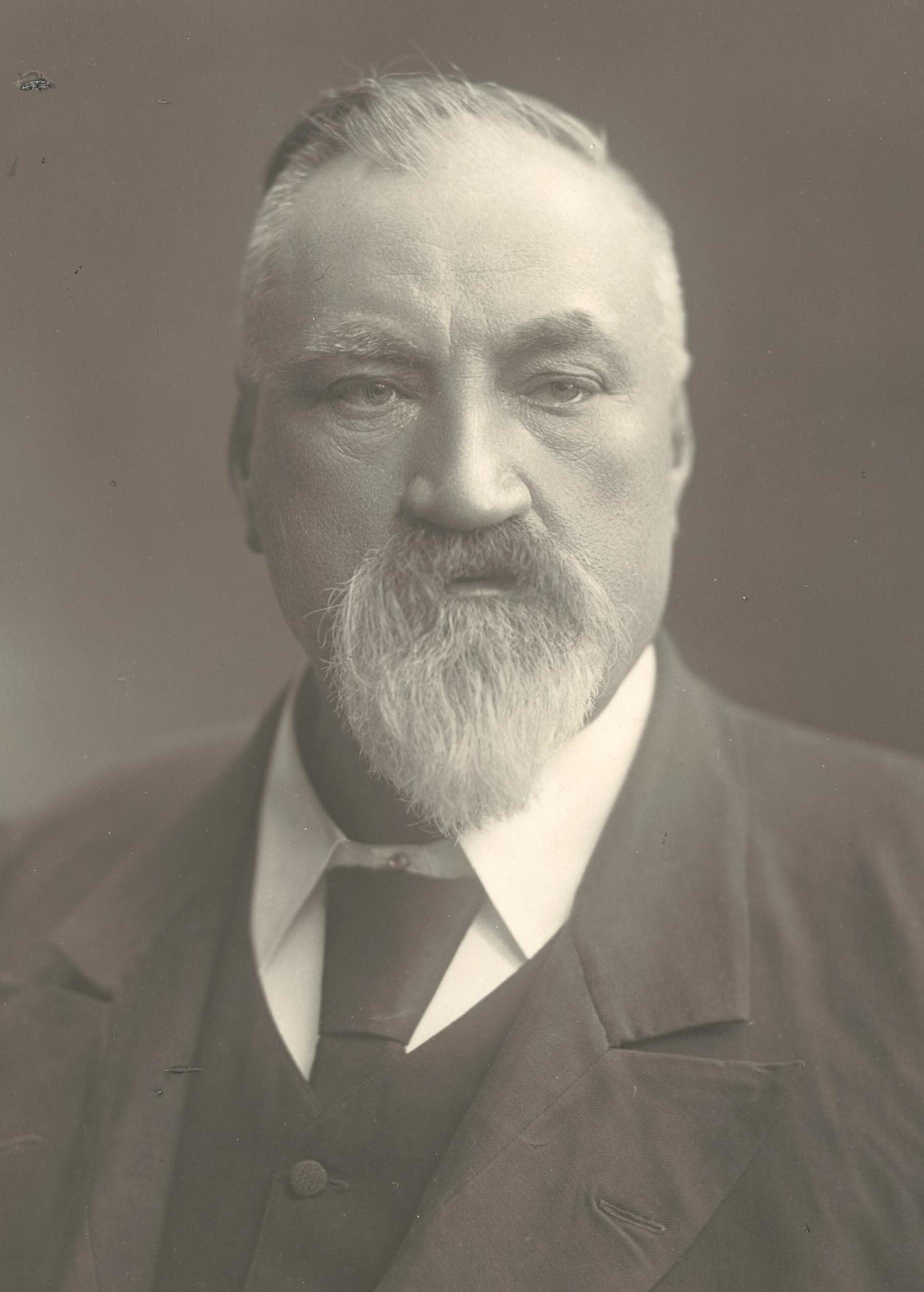

17th Premier of South Australia
- In office 11 June 1887 – 27 June 1889
- Monarch: Victoria
- Governor: Sir William Robinson; Earl of Kintore
- Preceded by: John Downer
- Succeeded by: John Cockburn
- In office 19 August 1890 – 21 June 1892
- Monarch: Victoria
- Governor: Earl of Kintore
- Preceded by: John Cockburn
- Succeeded by: Frederick Holder

Leader of the Government in the Senate
- In office 5 July 1905 – 31 December 1906
- Preceded by: Josiah Symon
- Succeeded by: Robert Best
- In office 24 September 1903 – 27 April 1904
- Preceded by: Richard O'Connor
- Succeeded by: Gregor McGregor

Minister for Defence
- In office 5 July 1905 – 24 January 1907
- Prime Minister: Alfred Deakin
- Preceded by: James Whiteside McCay
- Succeeded by: Thomas Ewing

Senator for South Australia
- In office 30 March 1901 – 31 December 1906

Leader of the Opposition in South Australia
- In office 1889–1890
- Preceded by: John Cockburn
- Succeeded by: Frederick Holder
- In office 1887–1887
- Preceded by: Jenkin Coles
- Succeeded by: John Downer

Personal details
- Born: 26 November 1837 Bethnal Green, London, England
- Died: 19 April 1915 (aged 77) Kent Town, South Australia
- Spouse: Mary Jane Kinsman (m. 1860)
- Children: 11
- Relatives: Thomas Playford I (father), Thomas Playford IV (grandson), John Henry Sexton (son-in-law)

Thomas Playford (26 November 1837 – 19 April 1915) was an Australian politician who served two terms as Premier of South Australia (1887–1889; 1890–1892). He subsequently entered federal politics, serving as a Senator for South Australia from 1901 to 1906 and as Minister for Defence from 1905 to 1907.

== Early life ==
Born in Bethnal Green, London in 1837, Thomas Playford II (Note: Delineating the various Thomas Playfords with a generation number is solely for ease of reference in this and related articles; in Australia there is no tradition of referring to "Thomas Playford II" et al. in speech or in writing.) moved to Adelaide in 1844 with his parents the Rev. Thomas Playford (c. 1795 – 18 September 1873) and his wife Mary Anne Playford, née Perry (c. 1804 – 27 April 1872), two brothers and a sister. He worked as a farmer prior to entering politics.

== South Australian politics ==
Elected to the Parliament of South Australia at the 1868 election as the Member for Onkaparinga, he gained the sobriquet "Honest Tom" for his forthright and straightforward manner, although these same qualities would earn him the occasional disapproval of fellow politicians and the electorate, such as the remark in parliament "stinkwort and Emil Wentzel were weeds that have come from Germany", a remark that contributed to his defeat at the 1871 election. Playford returned to Parliament at the 1875 election as member for East Torrens and held the position of Reforming Commissioner for Crown Lands and Immigration before losing his seat yet again at the 1887 election. A month later however, he won the seat of Newcastle. By mid-1887 he became Premier and Treasurer, positions he would hold for two years until a vote of no confidence passed. During his premiership, his most important achievement was considered to be the implementation of the first systematic tariff system for South Australia.

He regained East Torrens at the 1890 election and a few months later he formed his second government, again becoming Premier and Treasurer, and would again last for two years. He received kudos for significantly reducing the colony's debt, although he spent much of this second term in India. Charles Kingston brought together the various 'liberal' groups and was able to defeat the conservative John Downer government at the 1893 election with Labor support. The Kingston government would last for a then-record six years. Kingston had appointed Playford as Treasurer in his government, however in 1894 Playford moved to London to act as Agent-General for South Australia before returning to South Australia in 1898 to serve in Kingston's government from the 1899 election as member for Gumeracha, until he crossed the floor in later that year over a potential erosion of the power of the Legislative Council, bringing down the Kingston government in the process. He also found the time to involve himself in the planning of the Federation of the Australian Commonwealth and drafting the Australian Constitution. As part of this, he proposed the title "Commonwealth of Australia".

== Federal politics ==
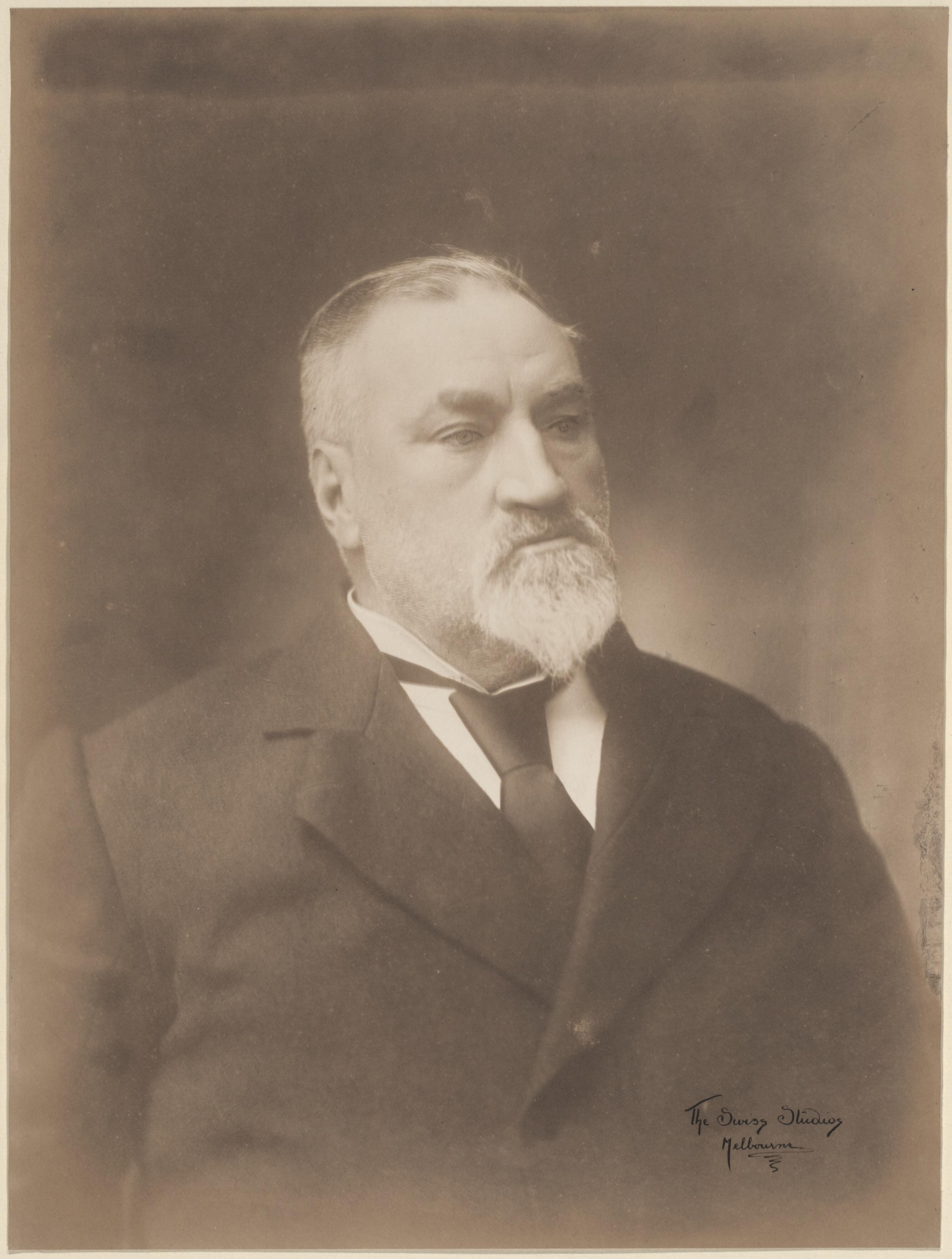
Playford, c. 1901

As a moderate Protectionist, but with the endorsement of the conservative Australasian National League (formerly National Defence League), Playford became a Senator at the inaugural 1901 federal election. Two years later in Alfred Deakin's government, Playford served for seven months as Leader of the Government in the Senate and Vice-President of the Executive Council. He became Minister for Defence in 1905 which he held for 18 months. He was defeated in the 1906 federal election, the first serving Minister to suffer this fate. His term as a Senator ended on 31 December 1906, and his ministerial commission was terminated on 24 January 1907. Playford made one further unsuccessful attempt to re-enter the Senate at the 1910 federal election.

== Death ==
Playford died in Kent Town, Adelaide on 19 April 1915.

== Family ==
Playford married Mary Jane Kinsman (born 20 May 1835, the daughter of Rev. William Kinsman) on 16 December 1860. The couple had eleven children: five sons, five daughters and one adoptive daughter.

His eldest daughter Annie (died 1956) married the Rev. John Henry Sexton on 30 June 1886.

On 1 January 1889 his second daughter Eliza (born 1866) married Harry J. Tuck (born 1863), elder brother of painter Marie Tuck and later headmaster at Unley High School.

Playford's grandson, Sir Thomas Playford, also served as Premier of South Australia.

== See also ==
- Hundred of Playford

== Sources ==
- Jupp, J. (2004) The English in Australia, Cambridge University Press, Cambridge.
- Cockburn, S. (1991) Playford: Benevolent Despot Axiom Publishing: Adelaide. ISBN 0-9594164-4-7.

Parliament of South Australia
Preceded by William Milne	Member for Onkaparinga; 1868–1871; Served alongside: William Townsend, Friedrich Krichauff	Succeeded by William Bundey
Preceded by George Stevenson	Member for East Torrens; 1875–1887; Served alongside: Edwin Smith, David Murray	Succeeded by Saul Solomon
Preceded by Patrick Coglin	Member for Newcastle; 1887–1890; Served alongside: Thomas Burgoyne	Succeeded by Joseph Hancock
Preceded by Saul Solomon	Member for East Torrens; 1890–1894; Served alongside: Edwin Smith, Frederick Coneybeer	Succeeded by David Packham
Preceded by William Randell	Member for Gumeracha; 1899–1901; Served alongside: Robert Homburg	Succeeded by William Jamieson
Political offices
Preceded by David Bower	Commissioner of Public Works; 1884–1885	Succeeded by Jenkin Coles
Preceded by Jenkin Coles	Leader of the Opposition of South Australia; 1887	Succeeded by John Downer
Preceded by John Downer	Premier of South Australia; 1887–1889	Succeeded by John Cockburn
Preceded by John Cockburn	Leader of the Opposition of South Australia; 1889–1890	Succeeded by Frederick Holder
Preceded by John Cockburn	Premier of South Australia; 1890–1892	Succeeded by Frederick Holder
Parliament of Australia
New division	Senator for South Australia; 1901–1906	Succeeded by William Russell; Joseph Vardon; James O'Loghlin
Political offices
Preceded by Richard O'Connor	Vice-President of the Executive Council; 1903 – 1904	Succeeded by Gregor McGregor
Preceded by James Whiteside McCay	Minister for Defence; 1905 – 1907	Succeeded by Thomas Ewing
Diplomatic posts
Preceded by John Cox Bray	Agent-General for South Australia; 1894–1898	Succeeded by John Cockburn
