= George Charles Hawker =

Australian politician (1818–1895)

The Honourable George Hawker
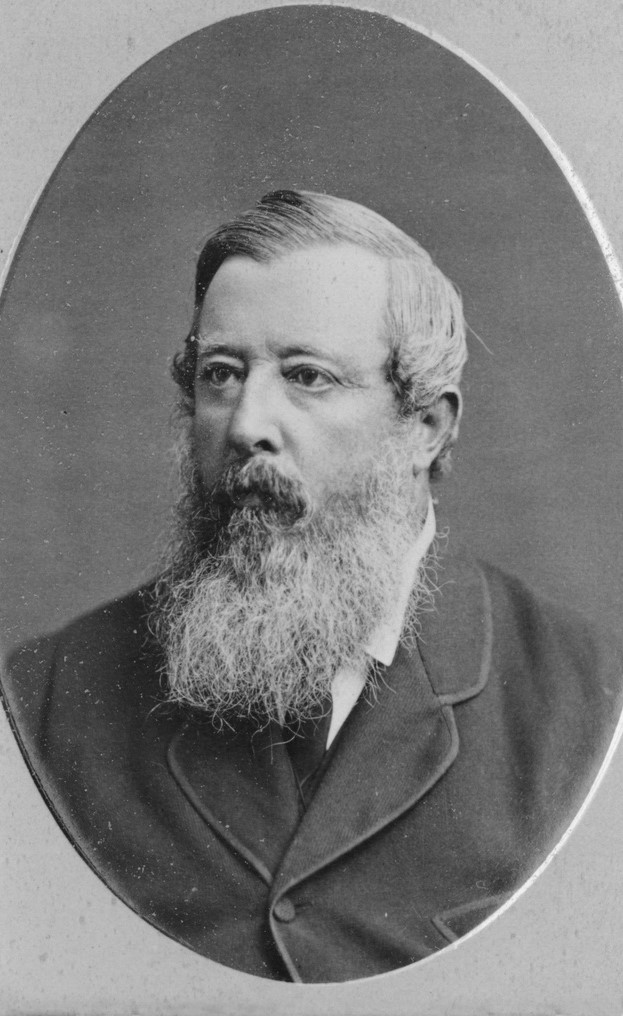

Chief Secretary of South Australia
- In office 25 March 1876 – 6 June 1876
- Premier: James Boucaut
- Preceded by: William Morgan
- Succeeded by: Henry Ayers

Treasurer of South Australia
- In office 25 May 1875 – 3 June 1875
- Premier: Arthur Blyth
- Preceded by: Lavington Glyde
- Succeeded by: John Colton

Member of the South Australian Parliament for North Adelaide
- In office 8 April 1884 – 21 May 1895 Serving with Edward Stirling, Lewis Cohen and Richard Wood
- Preceded by: John Parsons
- Succeeded by: Paddy Glynn

Member of the South Australian Parliament for Victoria
- In office 22 February 1875 – 11 May 1883 Serving with John Ingleby and Lavington Glyde
- Preceded by: Park Laurie
- Succeeded by: William Whinham
- In office 5 January 1858 – 28 February 1865 Serving with Randolph Stow
- Preceded by: Robert Leake
- Succeeded by: Adam Gordon

Personal details
- Born: 21 September 1818 London, United Kingdom
- Died: 21 May 1895 (aged 76) Medindie, South Australia
- Spouse: Elizabeth Seymour

George Charles Hawker (21 September 1818 – 21 May 1895) was a South Australian settler and politician.

== Early life ==
Hawker was born in London, the second son of Admiral Edward Hawker and his first wife, Joanna Naomi (née Poore). He was educated partly on the continent, and he entered Trinity College, Cambridge, in 1836 (B.A.1841, M.A. 1854).

== Career in Australia ==
Together with his brother Charles, Hawker went to South Australia in 1840 travelling aboard the Lysander.

In 1851, Hawker was a candidate for Stanley in the South Australian Legislative Council, but was defeated.

His widow's appeal for a posthumous award was approved by the Queen in September 1895, and she was known as Lady Hawker until her death.

== Family ==
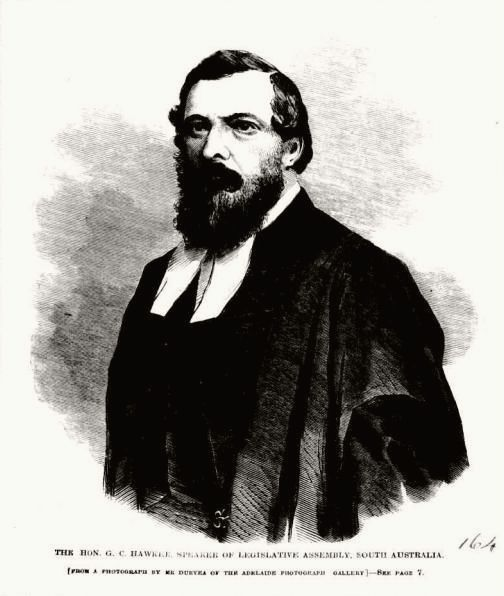
George Charles Hawker, 1865

Admiral Edward Hawker (7 November 1782 – 8 June 1860), of Ashford Lodge, Petersfield married Joanna Naomi Poore. They were the parents and grandparents of several notable pioneers of the Colony of South Australia:

George Charles Hawker married Elizabeth "Bessie" Seymour (died June 1901) on 16 December 1845, daughter of Henry Seymour, pastoralist at Naracoorte. Her younger sister Jane married pastoralist and politician William Spence Peter in 1856. George was about to be knighted when he died, consequently Bessie was granted the rank of the widow of a knight. Lady Hawker died in June 1901. They had six sons and six daughters, including:

- Edward William Hawker (1850–1940), was MHA for Stanley 1884–1999 and 1893–1896.
  - George Stanley Hawker M.C. (7 May 1894 – 17 February 1979) was MHA for Burra 1947–1956
- Henry Colley "Harry" Hawker, Lieut., RN (14 August 1852 – c. 23 December 1912) married Julia Gordon Lanoe Hawker (1854–1927) in 1879
  - A. Seymour Hawker (1880–1953) married Irene De St Croix Wilkinson ( – ) in 1910. He was a mayor of Adelaide
    - Joan Seymour Hawker ( – ) married cousin John Carey Hawker (1904–1970) on 2 March 1935
  - Lanoe George Hawker VC (30 December 1890 – 23 November 1916)
  - Tyrrell Mann Hawker (20 August 1892 – November 1916)
- George Charles Hawker, jun. (c. 1854 – 15 February 1889) married Joanna Fitzgerald Barr Smith (1866 – ) in 1886. Joanna was third daughter of Robert Barr Smith and Joanna Smith née Elder.
  - Elizabeth Seymour Hawker (1887 – )
  - Robert Barr Hawker (15 January 1889 – )
- Michael Seymour Hawker (1857 – 1 August 1933) was born in South Australia and educated at Stubbington School and in Germany. On his father's death he managed Bungaree station. In 1906 the brothers dissolved their partnership and divided the property, Michael's portion being North Bungaree, near Andrews, where he successfully bred Merino sheep. He also had interests in Partacoona station, north of Quorn, McCoy's Well station, near Nackara, Mount Victor Station, near Yunta and others in Western Australia, Queensland and New South Wales. He married Elizabeth Begg McFarlane, daughter of Allan McFarlane jun. of Wellington Lodge, Lake Alexandrina, on 9 June 1891 and ten years later built an extensive residence called Pirralirra in Aldgate, later St. Joseph's convent, subsequently a private residence.
  - Charles Allan Seymour Hawker (16 May 1894 – 25 October 1938), educated at the Geelong Grammar School and at Trinity College Cambridge (MA), was a South Australian member of the Commonwealth House of Representatives from 1929 to 1938 and a member of the Lyons government. He was killed in the Kyeema crash.
  - Michael Seymour Hawker (5 February 1903 - 13 October 1986) educated at Eton College, the Geelong Grammar School and read classics at Trinity College, Cambridge (BA), grazier. Married Patricia Monckton Synnot ( - ) amongst others elder sister of Admiral Sir Anthony Synnot RAN and sister-in-law of Hon. Peter Howson.
    - Mary Elizabeth Bridget van Dissel
    - Michael Charles Seymour Hawker
- Mary Blanche Hawker (1858 – 10 December 1945), married ophthalmologist Charles Gosse MD (c. 1849 – 1 July 1885), brother of the explorer William Gosse, on 11 May 1880. She left Australia after the accidental death of her husband and died at East Preston, Sussex.
- Isabella Hawker (21 June 1860 – )
- Walter Hawker (8 October 1861 – 30 October 1951) gained an M.D. at London University but never practised medicine, but founded the Anama stud near Clare where he bred merino sheep and Friesian cattle. He married Mary Faulkner ( – ) in London on 11 December 1888. They had a residence "Derrymor" at Glenside Road Crafers. (Derrymor was leased to Walter Hawker from 1907 to 1912. It was owned by his daughter Doris Philippa McFarlane from 1916 to 1924 and by another daughter Ruth Marjorie Gault from 1924 to 1947. Information retrieved from Lands Title records CT 600/164).
  - Trevor MacDonnell Hawker (1892–1958), lived in Western Australia
  - John Carey Hawker ( – ) married Joan Seymour Hawker ( – ) in 1935, inherited Anama stud. She was a daughter of Arden Seymour Hawker (1880–1953)
  - Ruth Marjorie Hawker (1897–1976) married Arthur Kyle Gault in 1921, lived at Medindie
  - Doris Philippa Hawker married Gordon Hector McFarlane on 19 April 1911.
- Richard MacDonnell Hawker (1866 – 24 March 1930) studied medicine at Cambridge but never practised. He married Adelaide Tennant (22 July 1874 – 8 April 1952) on 25 February 1903 and inherited "Bungaree". Adelaide, a daughter of Andrew Tennant, was a notable horsewoman.
  - Rona Elizabeth Hawker (1904 – 1971) married Fredrick Rufane Levinge ( – 1890)
  - Richard George Hawker (1907–1982)
  - Peter Seymour Hawker (1910–1939)
  - Naomi Tennant Hawker (1914–1994)
  - David Hawker (1918–1986)
- Bertram Robert Hawker (29 March 1868 – 1952) Anglican clergyman, educationist and benefactor, was born at Llandudno, Carnarvonshire, Wales, youngest of sixteen children of George Charles Hawker. At St Peter's Cathedral, Adelaide, on 23 July 1896 Hawker married Constance Victoria Buxton, daughter of Sir Thomas Buxton, the Governor of South Australia.

His brother James Collins Hawker (c. 1821–1901) arrived in SA aboard Pestonjee Bomanjee in October 1838. He became Comptroller of Customs at Port Adelaide and married Louisa, daughter of Captain Lipson.

- Edward Lipson Hawker (1851 – 1927)
- Elizabeth Emma Hawker (1852 – ) married land agent John James Neville Blyth, son of Arthur Blyth.
- Edith Louisa Mary Hawker (1854 – )
- Florence Adelaide Hawker (1856 – )
- James Clarence Hawker (1859 – ) married Agnes Maud Phillips in 1887
- Louisa Clarissa Hawker (1 July 1861 – ) married William Clarkson in 1887
- Thomas Lipson Hawker (1863 – 21 October 1933) married Isabella Male ( – 1956)
- Ethel Maude Hawker (1869 – )
- Lilian Beatrice Hawker (1872 – ) married John MacKenzie Henry in 1901

Another brother (fourth son of Edward Hawker) Charles Lloyd Hawker (c. 1827 – 3 April 1861) also arrived September 1840 aboard Lysander. He married Emma Jane Digby ( – ) in England on 15 October 1850 and returned to Adelaide aboard Success in February 1851. Also aboard Success was his brother Alfred and (sister?) a Miss Hawker. He founded Anama sheepstud; died in Adelaide while he and his family were preparing to return to England.

- Frederick Arthur Hawker (6 December 1851 – )
- Charles Edward Hawker (19 August 1853 – )

The youngest brother Alfred Hawker (10 January 1831 – 10 February 1868) arrived aboard Success in February 1851. He made numerous trips between England and South Australia, and died at sea aboard St Leonards while en route to London. He never married.

== See also ==
- Hundred of Hawker
- Hawker, South Australia

Parliament of South Australia
Preceded by Robert Leake	Member of Parliament for Victoria; 1858–1865; Served alongside: Randolph Stow	Succeeded by Adam Gordon
Preceded by Park Laurie	Member of Parliament for Victoria; 1875–1883; Served alongside: John Ingleby, Lavington Glyde	Succeeded by William Whinham
Preceded by John Parsons	Member of Parliament for North Adelaide; 1884–1895; Served alongside: Edward Stirling, Lewis Cohen, Richard Wood	Succeeded by Paddy Glynn
Political offices
Preceded by William Morgan	Chief Secretary of South Australia; 1870	Succeeded by Henry Ayers
Preceded by Lavington Glyde	Treasurer of South Australia; 1875	Succeeded by John Colton
Preceded by John Colton	Commissioner of Public Works; 1876	Succeeded by James Ramsay
South Australian House of Assembly
Preceded by George Kingston	Speaker of the South Australian House of Assembly; 1860–1865	Succeeded by George Kingston
