= Electoral district of West Adelaide =

Former South Australian state electoral district

Coordinates: 34°56′S 138°35′E

West Adelaide South Australia—House of Assembly
- State: South Australia
- Created: 1862
- Abolished: 1902
- Namesake: West Adelaide
- Demographic: Metropolitan

West Adelaide was an electoral district of the House of Assembly in the Australian state of South Australia from 1862 to 1902.

The electoral district was created when the Electoral district of City of Adelaide was abolished in 1862 and West Adelaide and East Adelaide were created. The district of Adelaide was ultimately recreated in 1902 by the recombination of West and East Adelaide.

It was created by the Electoral Districts Act (No. 20) of the South Australian parliament in 1861 but it was not until the state election of 1862 election that candidates were first elected to represent West Adelaide. The electorate at its creation included all of the City of Adelaide (South Adelaide, North Adelaide and the Adelaide parklands) west of the centres of King William Street, Poole street, John Street and O'Connell Street.

In 1872 the area of the electorate shrank when the Electoral district of North Adelaide was created by excising those parts of East and West Adelaide south of the River Torrens.

== Members ==
Member	Party	Term	Member	Party	Term
James Verco		1862–1865	Emanuel Solomon		1862–1865
James Boucaut		1865–1868	Henry Fuller		1865–1870
William Simms		1868–1870	Henry Fuller		1865–1870
John Darling Sr.		1870–1871	P. B. Coglin		1870–1871
W. K. Simms		1871–1876	Judah Solomon		1871–1875
W. K. Simms		1871–1876	Thomas Johnson		1875–1878
John Darling Sr.		1876–1878	Thomas Johnson		1875–1878
W. K. Simms		1878–1881	Hugh Fraser		1878–1884
Charles Kingston		1881–1900	Hugh Fraser		1878–1884
Charles Kingston		1881–1900	A. A. Fox		1884–1887
Charles Kingston		1881–1900	Lawrence Grayson		1887–1893
Charles Kingston		1881–1900	Lee Batchelor	Labor	1893–1901
Bill Denny		1900–1902	Lee Batchelor	Labor	1893–1901
Bill Denny		1900–1902	Francis Keogh		1901–1902
