= Electoral district of Onkaparinga =

Former electoral district of South Australia (1857–1938)

Onkaparinga South Australia—House of Assembly
- State: South Australia
- Dates current: 1857–1938, 1956–1970
- Namesake: Onkaparinga River
- Demographic: Rural
- Coordinates: 35°10′S 138°30′E

Onkaparinga is a defunct electoral district that elected members to the House of Assembly, the lower house of the bicameral legislature of the Australian state of South Australia. It was established in 1857, abolished in 1902; re-established in 1938 and abolished again in 1970. It was named after the Onkaparinga River.

== Members ==
First incarnation (1857–1902)
| Member | Party | Term | Member | Party | Term |
|---|---|---|---|---|---|
| William Milne | | 1857–1868 | William Dawes | | 1857–1857 |
| William Milne | | 1857–1868 | William Townsend | | 1857–1870 |
| Thomas Playford II | | 1868–1871 | William Townsend | | 1857–1870 |
| Thomas Playford II | | 1868–1871 | Friedrich Krichauff | | 1870–1882 |
| William Bundey | | 1871–1875 | Friedrich Krichauff | | 1870–1882 |
| William Dunn | | 1875–1878 | Friedrich Krichauff | | 1870–1882 |
| William Bundey | | 1878–1881 | Friedrich Krichauff | | 1870–1882 |
| John Carr | | 1881–1884 | Friedrich Krichauff | | 1870–1882 |
| John Carr | | 1881–1884 | Rowland Rees | | 1882–1890 |
| Joseph Johnson | | 1884–1896 | Rowland Rees | | 1882–1890 |
| Joseph Johnson | | 1884–1896 | Robert Caldwell | Defence League | 1890–1896 |
| Walter Duncan | National League | 1896–1902 | Robert Caldwell | National League | 1896–1902 |

Second incarnation (1938–1970)
| Member | Party | Term |
|---|---|---|
| Howard Shannon | Liberal and Country | 1938–1968 |
| Stan Evans | Liberal and Country | 1968–1970 |
