= Electoral district of Noarlunga =

Former colonial/state electoral district of South Australia

Coordinates: 35°05′53″S 138°31′39″E

Noarlunga South Australia—House of Assembly
- State: South Australia
- Created: 1857
- Abolished: 1902
- Namesake: Noarlunga, South Australia
- Demographic: Rural

Noarlunga was an electoral district of the House of Assembly in the Australian state of South Australia from 1857 to 1902.

Noarlunga was also the name of an electoral district of the unicameral South Australian Legislative Council from 1851 until its abolition in 1857, William Peacock being the elected member.

The Noarlunga area is currently represented between the seats of Mawson and Kaurna.

Rural at the time, Noarlunga would now be considered metropolitan.

== Members ==
Member	Party	Term	Member	Party	Term
Thomas Young		1857–1860	Henry Mildred		1857–1860
David Sutherland		1860–1862	Alexander Anderson		1860–1862
Charles Thomas Hewett		1862–1865	John Colton		1862–1870
John Carr		1865–1879	John Colton		1862–1870
John Carr		1865–1879	James Stewart		1870–1871
John Carr		1865–1879	Charles Myles		1871–1875
John Carr		1865–1879	John Colton		1875–1878
John Carr		1865–1879	Thomas Atkinson		1878–1887
John Colton		1880–1887	Thomas Atkinson		1878–1887
Charles Dashwood		1887–1892	Alexander McDonald		1887–1891
Charles Dashwood		1887–1892	Alexander McDonald	Defence League	1891–1896
William Blacker		1892–1902	Alexander McDonald	Defence League	1891–1896
William Blacker		1892–1902	Alexander McDonald	National League	1896–1902

== See also ==
- Noarlunga (disambiguation)
