= Thomas Atkinson (Australian politician) =

Australian politician

Thomas Atkinson (06 July 1822 – 15 October 1906) was a farmer and politician from Willunga, South Australia. He served as a Member of Parliament for the South Australian House of Assembly, as a representative for Noarlunga district. In later life he was frequently referred to as "Captain Atkinson".

== Early life ==
Thomas Atkinson was born in 1822 in Waddingham, England.

He was born as the third son of Robert Anderson (1774-1832) and Susannah Fish (1788-1832) of Hayes Farm, Snitterby, Lincolnshire. He had three brothers and two sister. Atkinson was orphaned at age 9. During his childhood in England, Atkinson studied under Mr. Middleton of Waddingham, and learning architecture and bricklaying.

HIs eldest brother, William, managed the family the family estate until poor health forced him to sell the estate and relocate to a warmer climate. The family moved to America for a brief time, before finally moving to Australia.

They arrived at Holdfast Bay, Australia, on 12 November 1839, on the barque Singapore under Captain Hamilton. And have brought with them three experienced farmers as future employees.

At first they established a homestead in Kangarillia, in which Atkinson played a significant part in building, but after two months they relocated to Willunga, after finding better land. They established their farm there, along with a dairy and cattle station.

== History ==
At first the going was hard; their first livestock were expensive (the first 40 head of cattle which they purchased cost them from £16 to £20 each, and their horses from £65 to £95 per head), then recession hit and their progeny were virtually worthless and they were producing more butter than the market could bear, but then copper was found at Burra, and bullocks were in high demand so the brothers prospered. They dissolved their partnership and Thomas, who had received some instruction in architecture and bricklaying in England, built the Bush Inn at Willunga in 1840, and purchased Ashley Farm, where he and his wife (a daughter of Stephen Bastian) lived the rest of their lives.

Thomas was a good farmer, an early adopter of improved farming techniques; he was one of the first to employ seed drills and manure drills, and paid attention to scientific breeding of his cattle. The only time he exhibited in the Adelaide Show he won first prize for his Durham bull. He was also keen on thoroughbred racing, but though he employed a jockey and trainer, his only real successes were in country meetings. He was a longtime member of the Royal Agricultural and Horticultural Society of South Australia and for many years a committee member. He was a fine judge of horses and cattle and was employed in that capacity in most of the Shows throughout South Australia until 1898, when at 76 years of age he resigned from all his commitments.

He was one of South Australia's first justices of the peace, and was also appointed one of the first road commissioners (a predecessor of district councils) during Sir Henry Young's time, then was a member of the Willunga District Council for 28 years. He was a commissioner for the Sydney and Melbourne exhibitions, and for many years a member of the School Board of Advice. In 1860 he was appointed captain of the Willunga Rifle Volunteer Force, and in 1895 honorary captain of the Mounted Volunteer Force (both militias of the colony in the years before Federation). He took Sir John Colton's place in Parliament as member for Noarlunga in September 1878, and continued as a member until 1887, when Dashwood beat him by 13 votes. Though an able raconteur, he was not fond of public speaking and was referred to in Parliament as the "silent member".

== Family ==
Thomas's brothers who migrated to South Australia were: William (1814 – November 1840); Robert (1820 – 8 June 1862); Joseph (1824 – 25 September 1878). All died at Willunga. A sister Susanna (1828 – 31 May 1894) also made the trip and married James Holman (ca. 1827 – 1 May 1903) on 9 September 1852; they lived at Napperby, near Port Pirie.

Atkinson married Jane Bastian (1 April 1824 – 24 July 1910) on 20 May 1847.

Both died at "Ashley Farm" and were buried in St. Stephen's (Anglican) cemetery, Willunga.

Their adopted son, Thomas Arthur Palmer, was born in 1868 and died on 7 March 1885. They had no other children.
