= Friedrich Krichauff =

Australian politician

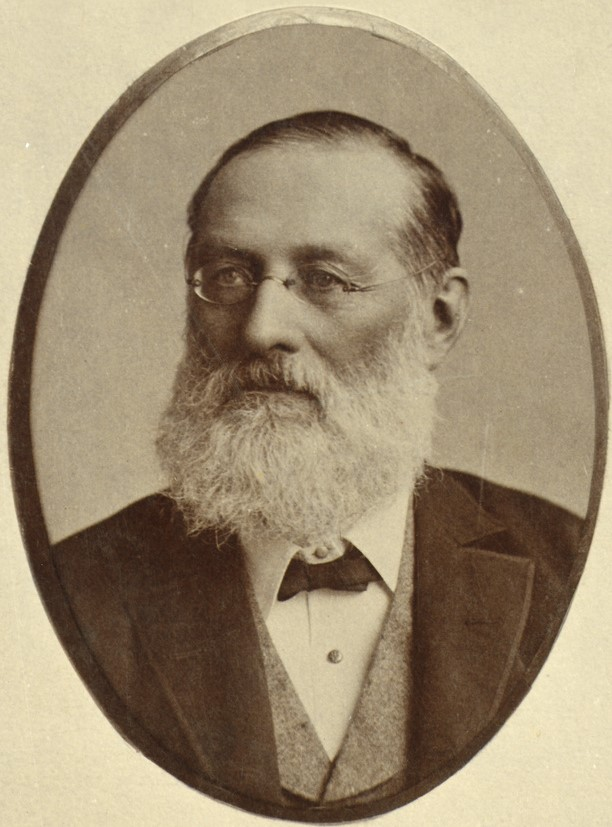

Friedrich Edouard Heinrich Wulf Krichauff (German: [ˈfʁiːdʁɪç eˈdwaːʁt ˈhaɪ̯nʁɪç vʊlf ˈkʁɪçʔaʊ̯f]; 15 December 1824 – 29 September 1904) was a politician in colonial South Australia.

Krichauff was born in Schleswig, Schleswig-Holstein, Germany, the son of Carl Krichauff, a judge of the Supreme Court of the Duchy of Schleswig, and his wife Julie, née von Bertouch.

Having passed through the State colleges of Schleswig and Husum, Krichauff served three years as an apprentice at the botanic gardens in connection with the University of Kiel. In 1846 he matriculated at the University of Berlin, and passed first class at examinations in Kiel. As a result, he was allowed a stipend by the Danish Government to travel as gardener and botanist; but the war of 1848 prevented him from enjoying this privilege.

Krichauff went to South Australia in December 1848, and settled at Bugle Ranges in the Adelaide Hills, east of the city of Adelaide. Krichauff was one of a number of influential German-speaking residents — such as Ludwig Becker, Hermann Beckler, William Blandowski, Amalie Dietrich, Wilhelm Haacke, Diedrich Henne, Gerard Krefft, Johann Luehmann, Johann Menge, Carl Mücke (a.k.a. Muecke), Ludwig Preiss, Carl Ludwig Christian Rümker (a.k.a. Ruemker), Moritz Richard Schomburgk, Richard Wolfgang Semon, Karl Theodor Staiger, George Ulrich, Eugene von Guérard, Robert von Lendenfeld, Ferdinand von Mueller, Georg von Neumayer, and Carl Wilhelmi — who brought their "epistemic traditions" to Australia, and not only became "deeply entangled with the Australian colonial project", but also were "intricately involved in imagining, knowing and shaping colonial Australia" (Barrett, et al., 2018, p.2).

For many years he was the chairman of the District Council of Macclesfield, as well of the District Council of Strathalbyn. He was elected to the South Australian House of Assembly for Mount Barker on 9 March 1857, but resigned on 12 March 1858. He was again elected to the House, this time for Onkaparinga on 5 April 1870, serving until 22 May 1882, when he resigned his seat to travel in Europe and America. After his return he was elected to the Assembly for the district of Victoria (8 April 1884), and continued to represent the constituency until his retirement from the House at the 1890 colonial election.

Krichauff briefly served as a Minister in May 1870, when he was Commissioner of Public Works for twenty days in Henry Strangways' reconstructed Cabinet. He was returned to the South Australian Legislative Council in June 1890 for the Southern District, holding the seat until 18 May 1894.

Krichauff married Dora Fischer at Bugle Ranges on 10 May 1853. He died in Norwood, Adelaide, South Australia, Australia on 29 September 1904.

Edward William Krichauff (1858 – 22 December 1925), a trustee of the State Bank of South Australia, was a son.

== See also ==
- Friedrich C. Krichauff, his son.

== Notes ==
Political offices
Preceded by John Colton	Commissioner of Public Works; 12 May 1870 – 30 May 1870	Succeeded by John Carr
South Australian House of Assembly
New district	Member for Mount Barker; 1857–1858; Served alongside: John Dunn	Succeeded by William Rogers
Previous: William Townsend	Member for Onkaparinga; 1870–1882; Served alongside: Thomas Reynolds	Succeeded by Rowland Rees
Previous: William Whinham	Member for Victoria; 1884–1890; Served alongside: John Bagot, Daniel Livingston, John Osman	Succeeded by James Cock
South Australian Legislative Council
Previous: James Garden Ramsay	Member for Southern District; 1890–1894; Served alongside: Samuel Tomkinson, John Hannah Gordon, Andrew Kirkpatrick, Richard Baker, Lancelot Stirling	Succeeded by Sir Edwin Thomas Smith
