= William Henry Bundey =

Australian politician and judge

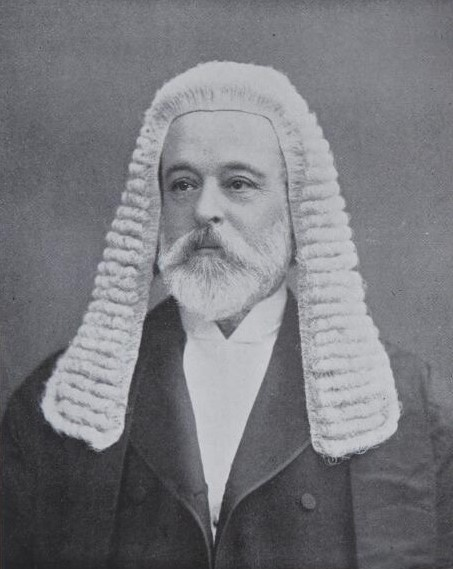
William Henry Bundy in 1901.

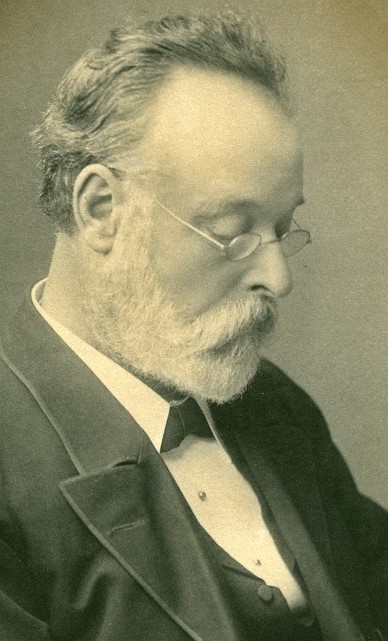
Portrait of William Henry Bundey from 1880.

Sir William Henry Bundey (30 January 1838 – 6 December 1909) was an Australian politician and judge, Attorney-General of South Australia from 27 September 1878 to 10 March 1881.

== Early life ==
Bundey was born in Exbury, Hampshire, England, the second son of James Bundey and his wife Harriett née Lockyer. The family emigrated to South Australia in 1848 after losing money in England. William's father died about a few weeks after his arrival.

In 1878 he was appointed a Queen's Counsel.

== Late life and legacy ==
As a young man Bundey was a captain in the Volunteer Military Movement. He was also a cricket enthusiast. He was vice-commodore of the South Australian Yacht Squadron in 1870–74 and commodore in 1874–84.

The residence built for him opposite Druids Avnue on Milan Terrace, Mount Lofty, later owned by Davis Browne, was re-purposed in 1927 as Stirling Hospital.

== See also ==
- Hundred of Bundey (South Australia)
- Hundred of Bundey (Northern Territory)

Political offices
Preceded by Charles Mann	Attorney-General of South Australia; 1878–1881	Succeeded by Josiah Symon
