= Rowland Rees =

Australian politician

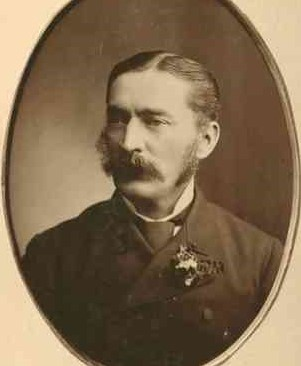

Member of the South Australian House of Assembly for The Burra
- In office 1873–1875

Member of the South Australian House of Assembly for Burra
- In office 1875–1881

Member of the South Australian House of Assembly for Onkaparinga
- In office 1882–1990

Personal details
- Born: 25 September 1840 Gibraltar
- Died: 13 October 1904 (aged 64)
- Occupation: architect and civil engineer

Rowland Rees (25 September 1840 – 13 October 1904) was an architect, civil engineer and politician in South Australia.

== Early life ==
Rees was born in Gibraltar, the eldest son of Rowland Rees, of Sutrana House, Dover, and later alderman of Brighton, England. He was educated in Hong Kong and Sheffield. It has also been asserted that he was educated in Dover, where his father was for many years mayor. He emigrated to Adelaide in 1869; his brother, Dr. John Rees followed seven years later. Rowland ("something of a black sheep in the family"), along with his brothers Allen and Charles, "had all three received and squandered their inheritance" and were accordingly left nothing in their father's will; at any rate, having suffered "some kind of financial catastrophe" and moved into "a small terrace villa in Hove", the senior Rowland Rees left only enough to cover a few preliminary bequests.

He was described as "a voluble Welshman" in one Adelaide newspaper report.

== Career ==
Rees began his architectural practice immediately upon arriving in the colony of South Australia, initially in partnership with architect Thomas English, from 19 February 1870 until 1873. They practised as English & Rees, Civil Engineers, Architects and Surveyors, of Temple Chambers, Currie Street, Adelaide.

He was in partnership with Joseph Hornabrook from 1878 to 1881, when Hornabrook left for a life on the professional stage.

Rees' work was usually characterised by bold decorative elements such as capitals, pilasters and pediments.

== Public office ==
He was elected to the South Australian House of Assembly as member for The Burra (1873–75), Burra (1875–81) and Onkaparinga (1882–90). He advanced liberal ideas, such as free education, the regulation (rather than banning) of gambling, and equal divorce rights for women. Rees was a member of the South Australian Institute from 1878, and helped to select works for the South Australian State Collection.

== Other roles ==
He was a director of the Holdfast Railway Company, for which firm he also acted as engineer.

== Selected works ==
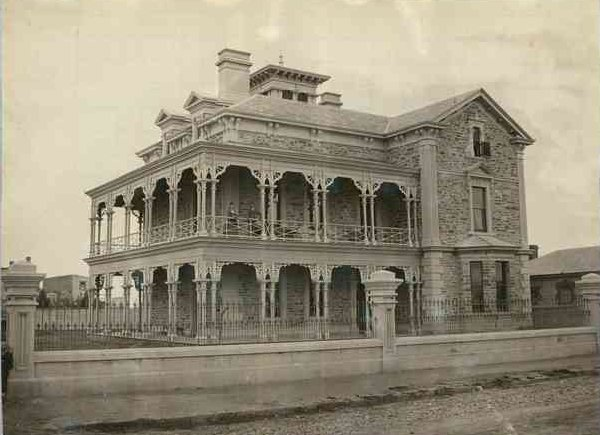
Essenside ca. 1873

- Moonta Methodist Church (1873)
- Essenside, Glenelg (1873)
- Downer House, North Adelaide (1877)
- Kither's Buildings, Rundle Street (1879)
- Holdfast Bay railway line (1879–80)
- Huntsman (now Archer) Hotel, North Adelaide, (1882)
- Lobethal Woollen Mills (1883)
- British Hotel, North Adelaide (1883)
- Oxford Hotel, North Adelaide (1884)
- Cumberland Arms Hotel, Waymouth Street (1884)
- Newmarket Hotel, North Terrace (1884)
- St Peters Town Hall (1885)
- Fulton's Foundry, Kilkenny (1885–86)

== Family ==
In November 1870 he married Ada Caroline Sandford (1853 – 12 September 1930), daughter of William Mathews Sandford ( – February 1902), an Adelaide solicitor. They had two surviving children:

- Rowland John Patton Rees (1872 – ) moved to Perth, Western Australia
- (Bagot) Sydney Rees (1873 – ) moved to Perth, Western Australia

Mrs. Rees lived for some time with her son Sydney in Perth, and died in Subiaco, Western Australia.

His brother John Rees, JP. (c. 1849–1893) studied at Guy's Hospital, and arrived in South Australia on 1 April 1876. He practised at Port Wakefield for two years before moving to Hindmarsh. He was mayor of Hindmarsh from December 1883 to December 1886, also serving as honorary Health Officer. He died of consumption (tuberculosis).

His sister Kathleen Rees in 1883 married the widower Dr. James Compton-Burnett (c. 1840 – 2 April 1901), 15 years his junior (so she was born around 1855). She had seven children by him, of whom Ivy Compton-Burnett (1884–1969) was the eldest; there were also five children by his first marriage.

Another sister Elizabeth Rees ( – 1941) married Robert Blackie (c.1852–1936). Their youngest daughter Margery Grace Blackie (1898–1981) was a noted homeopath.

== See also ==
- Hundred of Rees
