= Electoral results for the district of West Torrens =

South Australian district election results

This is a list of electoral results for the Electoral district of West Torrens in South Australian state elections.

== Members for West Torrens ==
First incarnation (1857–1902)
Member	Party	Term	Member	Party	Term
Luther Scammell		1857–1860	James Cole		1857–1860
Thomas Magarey		1860–1862	George Morphett		1860–1861
Thomas Magarey		1860–1862	Randolph Stow		1861–1865
Henry Strangways		1862–1871	Randolph Stow		1861–1865
Henry Strangways		1862–1871	John Pickering		1865–1868
Henry Strangways		1862–1871	George Bean		1868–1870
Henry Strangways		1862–1871	John Pickering		1870–1870
Henry Strangways		1862–1871	William Bean		1870–1871
James Boucaut		1871–1875	William Bean		1870–1871
James Boucaut		1871–1875	John Pickering		1871–1878
Benjamin Taylor		1875–1876	John Pickering		1871–1878
John Sinclair		1876–1878	John Pickering		1871–1878
William Magarey		1878–1881	William Bean		1878–1884
Frederick Bucknall		1881–1887	William Bean		1878–1884
Frederick Bucknall		1881–1887	Arthur Harvey		1884–1887
Benjamin Gould		1887–1893	Benjamin Nash		1887–1890
Benjamin Gould		1887–1893	Thomas Brooker		1890–1902
Frank Hourigan		1893–1901	Thomas Brooker		1890–1902
Second incarnation (1915–1938)
Member	Party	Term	Member	Party	Term
Henry Chesson	Labor	1915–1917	Thompson Green	Labor	1915–1917
Henry Chesson	National	1917–1918	Thompson Green	National	1917–1918
Alfred Blackwell	Labor	1918–1931	John McInnes	Labor	1918–1931
Alfred Blackwell	Parliamentary Labor	1931–1934	John McInnes	Parliamentary Labor	1931–1934
Alfred Blackwell	Labor	1934–1938	John McInnes	Labor	1934–1938

Third incarnation (1956–1970)
Member	Party	Term
Fred Walsh	Labor	1956–1965
Glen Broomhill	Labor	1965–1970
Fourth incarnation (2002–present)
Member	Party	Term
Tom Koutsantonis	Labor	2002–present

== Election results ==
=== Elections in the 2020s ===
==== 2026 ====
2026 South Australian state election: West Torrens
Party	Candidate	Votes	%	±%
Labor	Tom Koutsantonis	11,802	52.6	−2.3
One Nation	Judith Aldridge	4,045	18.0	+18.0
Greens	Sam Bannon	3,854	17.2	±0.0
Liberal	Sarika Sharma	2,174	9.7	−18.2
Family First	Anna Wamayi	390	1.7	+1.7
Australian Family	Mathew Wilson	179	0.8	+0.8
Total formal votes		22,444	97.4	+0.4
Informal votes		599	2.6	−0.4
Turnout		23,043	88.6	−0.6
Two-candidate-preferred result
Labor	Tom Koutsantonis	16,439	73.2	+4.4
One Nation	Judith Aldridge	6,005	26.8	+26.8
Labor hold				

==== 2022 ====
2022 South Australian state election: West Torrens
Party	Candidate	Votes	%	±%
Labor	Tom Koutsantonis	12,496	54.9	+4.3
Liberal	Helika Cruz	6,353	27.9	−2.4
Greens	Peta-Anne Louth	3,919	17.2	+5.8
Total formal votes		22,768	97.0	
Informal votes		708	3.0	
Turnout		23,476	89.2	
Two-party-preferred result
Labor	Tom Koutsantonis	15,654	68.8	+4.5
Liberal	Helika Cruz	7,114	31.2	−4.5
Labor hold		Swing	+4.5	

Distribution of preferences: West Torrens
Party	Candidate	Votes	Round 1	
Party	Candidate	Votes	Dist.	Total
Quota (50% + 1)		11,385		
Labor	Tom Koutsantonis	12,496	+3,158	15,654
Liberal	Helika Cruz	6,353	+761	7,114
Greens	Alexandra McGee	3,919	Excluded	

=== Elections in the 2010s ===
==== 2018 ====
2018 South Australian state election: West Torrens
Party	Candidate	Votes	%	±%
Labor	Tom Koutsantonis	11,147	50.3	−0.3
Liberal	Helika Cruz	7,082	32.0	−1.5
Greens	Livio Forza	2,563	11.6	−0.1
Dignity	Phillip Beddall	1,100	5.0	+5.0
Danig	Josh Dimas	270	1.2	+1.2
Total formal votes		22,162	95.5	−1.2
Informal votes		1,037	4.5	+1.2
Turnout		23,199	90.0	+3.7
Two-party-preferred result
Labor	Tom Koutsantonis	14,010	63.2	+0.9
Liberal	Helika Cruz	8,152	36.8	−0.9
Labor hold		Swing	+0.9	

2014 South Australian state election: West Torrens
Party	Candidate	Votes	%	±%
Labor	Tom Koutsantonis	10,261	49.1	−1.0
Liberal	Serge Ambrose	7,295	34.9	+2.0
Greens	Tim White	2,454	11.7	−0.2
Family First	Tim Leeder	894	4.3	+0.8
Total formal votes		20,904	96.7	+0.1
Informal votes		712	3.3	−0.1
Turnout		21,616	90.5	−1.7
Two-party-preferred result
Labor	Tom Koutsantonis	12,716	60.8	+0.0
Liberal	Serge Ambrose	8,188	39.2	−0.0
Labor hold		Swing	+0.0	

2010 South Australian state election: West Torrens
Party	Candidate	Votes	%	±%
Labor	Tom Koutsantonis	9,684	47.3	−9.3
Liberal	Jassmine Wood	7,449	36.4	+9.5
Greens	Tim White	2,232	10.9	+2.6
Family First	David Beattie	636	3.1	−1.9
Save the RAH	Kon Briggs	477	2.3	+2.3
Total formal votes		20,478	96.4	
Informal votes		711	3.6	
Turnout		21,189	92.2	
Two-party-preferred result
Labor	Tom Koutsantonis	11,613	56.7	−11.5
Liberal	Jassmine Wood	8,865	43.3	+11.5
Labor hold		Swing	−11.5	

=== Elections in the 2000s ===
2006 South Australian state election: West Torrens
Party	Candidate	Votes	%	±%
Labor	Tom Koutsantonis	11,222	56.6	+10.8
Liberal	Emilio Costanzo	5,318	26.8	−8.6
Greens	Timothy White	1,644	8.3	+2.1
Family First	David Wall	988	5.0	+2.2
Democrats	Nicole Prince	660	3.3	−3.2
Total formal votes		19,832	96.6	
Informal votes		694	3.4	
Turnout		20,526	91.0	
Two-party-preferred result
Labor	Tom Koutsantonis	13,536	68.3	+9.7
Liberal	Emilio Costanzo	6,296	31.7	−9.7
Labor hold		Swing	+9.7	

2002 South Australian state election: West Torrens
Party	Candidate	Votes	%	±%
Labor	Tom Koutsantonis	9,452	45.8	+6.6
Liberal	Theo Vlassis	7,307	35.4	−0.5
Democrats	Nicole Lomman	1,353	6.6	−7.0
Greens	Deb Cashel	1,284	6.2	+6.2
Family First	Lawrence Chattaway	568	2.8	+2.8
SA First	Alex Filipovic	375	1.8	+1.8
One Nation	Jean Holmes	300	1.5	+1.5
Total formal votes		20,639	96.6	
Informal votes		721	3.4	
Turnout		21,360	93.1	
Two-party-preferred result
Labor	Tom Koutsantonis	12,090	58.6	+4.1
Liberal	Theo Vlassis	8,549	41.4	−4.1
Labor hold		Swing	+4.1	

=== Elections in the 1960s ===
1968 South Australian state election: West Torrens
Party	Candidate	Votes	%	±%
Labor	Glen Broomhill	20,283	55.7	−1.1
Liberal and Country	Ross Stanford	14,838	40.7	−2.5
Democratic Labor	Gary Lockwood	1,295	3.6	+3.6
Total formal votes		36,416	97.9	+0.6
Informal votes		771	2.1	−0.6
Turnout		37,187	94.5	+0.4
Two-party-preferred result
Labor	Glen Broomhill	20,477	56.2	−0.6
Liberal and Country	Ross Stanford	15,939	43.8	+0.6
Labor hold		Swing	−0.6	

1965 South Australian state election: West Torrens
Party	Candidate	Votes	%	±%
Labor	Glen Broomhill	18,496	56.8	−0.7
Liberal and Country	Parker Morton	14,068	43.2	+4.8
Total formal votes		32,564	97.3	−1.3
Informal votes		899	2.7	+1.3
Turnout		33,463	94.1	+0.3
Labor hold		Swing	−1.3	

1962 South Australian state election: West Torrens
Party	Candidate	Votes	%	±%
Labor	Fred Walsh	16,453	57.5	+6.9
Liberal and Country	Parker Morton	10,983	38.4	−5.5
Democratic Labor	Thomas Keain	1,177	4.1	−1.4
Total formal votes		28,613	98.6	+1.0
Informal votes		392	1.4	−1.0
Turnout		29,005	93.8	+0.2
Two-party-preferred result
Labor	Fred Walsh	16,630	58.1	+6.7
Liberal and Country	Parker Morton	11,983	41.9	−6.7
Labor hold		Swing	+6.7	
