= Members of the South Australian House of Assembly, 1887–1890 =

This is a list of members of the South Australian House of Assembly from 1887 to 1890, as elected at the 1887 colonial election:

Name	Electorate	Term of office
Josiah Howell Bagster	Yatala	1881–1890
Harry Bartlett	Yorke Peninsula	1887–1896
M. P. F. Basedow	Barossa	1878–1901
David Bews	Wallaroo	1885–1891
Hon John Cox Bray	East Adelaide	1871–1892
Thomas Burgoyne	Newcastle	1884–1915
Robert Caldwell	Yorke Peninsula	1884–1902
John William Castine	Wooroora	1884–1902
Hon Alfred Catt	Gladstone	1881–1906
John Cockburn	Mount Barker	1884–1898
Lewis Cohen	North Adelaide	1887–1893, 1902–1906
Jenkin Coles	Light	1875–1878, 1881–1911
Charles Dashwood	Noarlunga	1887–1892
Henry Edward Downer	Encounter Bay	1881–1896
Hon Sir John Downer	Barossa	1878–1901
John Duncan	Wooroora	1871–1878, 1884–1890
Luke Furner	Wallaroo	1878–1890
William Gilbert	Yatala	1881–1906
Clement Giles	Frome	1887–1902
Peter Paul Gillen ^{[3]}	Stanley	1889–1896
Paddy Glynn	Light	1887–1890, 1895–1896, 1897–1901
Benjamin Gould	West Torrens	1887–1893
Lawrence Grayson	West Adelaide	1887–1893
Andrew Dods Handyside	Albert	1885–1904
Edward William Hawker ^{[3]}	Stanley	1884–1889, 1893–1886
Hon George Charles Hawker	North Adelaide	1858–1865, 1875–1883, 1884–1895
Frederick Holder	Burra	1887–1901
Robert Homburg	Gumeracha	1884–1905
George Feltham Hopkins	Port Adelaide	1887–1893
William Horn	Flinders	1887–1893
James Henderson Howe	Gladstone	1881–1896
Charles Henry Hussey	Encounter Bay	1887–1890
John Jenkins	Sturt	1887–1905
Frank Johnson	Onkaparinga	1884–1896
Charles Kimber	Stanley	1887–1890
Hon Charles Kingston	West Adelaide	1881–1900
Friedrich Krichauff	Victoria	1857–1858, 1870–1882, 1884–1890
Albert Henry Landseer	Mount Barker	1875–1899
Daniel Livingston ^{[2]}	Victoria	1887–1888
William Mattinson	Port Adelaide	1881–1890
Alexander McDonald	Noarlunga	1887–1915
Beaumont Arnold Moulden	Albert	1887–1890
John Moule	Flinders	1884–1896
Benjamin Nash	West Torrens	1887–1893
John James Osman ^{[2]}	Victoria	1888–1893
Hon Thomas Playford	Newcastle	1868–1871, 1875–1894, 1899–1901
Rowland Rees	Onkaparinga	1873–1881, 1882–1890
Robert Dalrymple Ross ^{[1]}	Gumeracha	1875–1884, 1884–1887
Ben Rounsevell	Burra	1875–1893, 1899–1906
Theodor Scherk	East Adelaide	1886–1905
Sir Edwin Thomas Smith	East Torrens	1871–1877, 1878–1893
Saul Solomon	East Torrens	1887–1890
Lancelot Stirling ^{[1]}	Gumeracha	1881–1887, 1888–1890
William Frederick Stock	Sturt	1887–1893
Ebenezer Ward	Frome	1870–1880, 1881–1890

^{1} Gumeracha MHA Robert Dalrymple Ross died on 27 December 1887. Lancelot Stirling won the resulting by-election on 12 May 1888.
^{2} Victoria MHA Daniel Livingston died on 30 September 1888. John James Osman won the resulting by-election on 1 November.
^{3} Stanley MHA Edward William Hawker resigned on 28 May 1889. Peter Paul Gillen won the resulting by-election on 25 June.
