= William Magarey =

William Magarey may refer to:

- William Ashley Magarey (1868–1929), South Australian lawyer, inaugural chairman of SAFA, originator of the Magarey Medal
- William James Magarey, member of the South Australian House of Assembly for the district of West Torrens in the Ninth Parliament (1878-1881)
