= W. H. Gray =

Wealthy colonist of South Australia, ownership and development of land

William Henry Gray (18 January 1808 – 6 September 1896), generally known as W. H. Gray, was a pioneer colonist of South Australia who amassed considerable wealth through ownership and development of land.

== History ==
Gray was born to Thomas and Ellen Gray in Bermondsey, London, England and baptised in St Mary's Church, Newington on 4 September 1808. He was educated at Bacon's School on Grange Road, Bermondsey, apprenticed as a tanner, and worked at that trade until the age of 29 years. From around 1830 he attended night classes in London, where he made the acquaintance of Robert Thomas, founder of The Register, and J. M. Skipper, and through them became interested in the theories of E. G. Wakefield and the projected colony of South Australia.

Gray, his sister Elizabeth, and two servants emigrated to South Australia aboard John Renwick, six months after the "First Fleet of South Australia", arriving in February, 1837. He had purchased the rights to three (as yet unsurveyed and unallocated) land packages consisting of one town acre (0.40 ha) and one country property of 80 acres (32 ha) from the South Australian Company for a total outlay of £243. The 80 acres was later increased to 134 acres (54 ha).

Colonel Light completed his city survey in March 1837 and purchasers of preliminary town acres were able to make their selections in turn, as determined by lot. City acres not selected were then auctioned, and Gray picked up another 14 of the 595 offered, at a total cost of £126 6s. Most of Gray's selections were in the north-west corner of the city, his rationale being that business would develop close to the Port Road. Gray and his manservant built a thatched pug and pine cottage on one of his North Terrace allotments, so the little party could move from their tents to something more secure and comfortable. His properties were acre 3 on North Terrace, 60–62 on the north side and 63–65 on the south side of Hindley Street and 119–123 on the north side of Currie Street. Sections 3, 60, 65 and 122 ran in a straight line between North Terrace and Currie Street, and Gray ran a thoroughfare (Gray Street) through the middle of them, and built cottages on either side; some quite densely packed. Acre 63 later became the site of "Campden", his town house. His other selections were in North Adelaide: Kermode Street, Brougham Place, Childers Street and Barton Terrace. Acre 727 on Brougham Place and 722 on Kermode Street were contiguous, and Gray drove a thoroughfare (Bagot's Lane) through their centres. Town Acre 747 on Barton Terrace he left intact and later became the site of Ru Rua Hospital.

A limited number of country sections became available for selection in May 1838 and preliminary purchasers like Gray were in a good position to choose the better land, and closer to the city. He was entitled to three, and chose sections 203 just north of Glenelg, 420 near Port Adelaide in the angle between the Old and New Port Roads, and 376 on the Port Road much closer to the city. Then in the release to the general public he picked up another six sections north of 203, giving him around 600 acres (240 ha) in the West Beach area. This was the beginning of his holdings in The Reedbeds area, the shallow marshland of the Torrens outlet which includes the modern suburbs Fulham, Lockleys and Underdale. By 1843 he and his tenants had 100 acres of wheat and 10 of barley and some pigs, cows and horses beside.

In the early 1840s the Colony was bankrupted by Governor Gawler's lavish spending on infrastructure (largely to stave off unemployment) and George Grey was sent out to replace him, and effected strict economies. In the resulting recession, many colonists were made insolvent, and Gray, who relied on rent from his city cottages for much of his income, was forced to borrow heavily in a desperate gamble to avoid joining them. By 1845 however, with a little help from the Burra copper mine, the colony's economy had turned around and by 1848 Gray had repaid his creditors.

In 1850–1851 Gray added another 328 acres (133 ha) including sections 165, 215, 216 and 169 to his holdings in the Reedbeds area, but later that year an exodus of able-bodied men from South Australia to the Victorian goldfields began, and until late 1853 when the tide started to turn, income from his rental properties dropped away, and he invested in no new properties. In 1855 he added to his portfolio some 900 acres (360 ha) of good cereal-growing Barossa land, which he leased and later sold to German settlers at a sizable profit. In 1858 he was able to purchase from Joseph Johnson, "Frogmore", a 500 acres (200 ha) Reedbeds farm, and moved into its attractive (now long since demolished) cottage near what is now the north-west intersection of West Beach and Tapleys Hill roads.

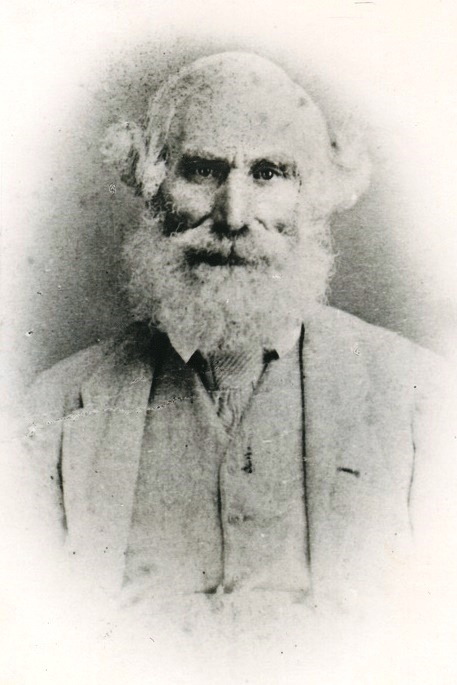
William Henry Gray (1808–1896) of the Reedbeds, Adelaide, c. 1870

It is likely that Gray was brought up in the Church of England into which he had been baptised, and his sister was a congregant at Trinity Church, but at some stage he became a Unitarian and contributed to the erection of the Church in Wakefield Street. He was a friend of the Rev. John Crawford Woods, who solemnized his marriage to Rosetta Bagshaw on 16 January 1861. The disparity in their ages may have prompted fellow-Unitarian Catherine Helen Spence to write, in a work of fiction:

"It is not natural or right for a girl of nineteen to marry a man of fifty-three, and that is his age, as everyone knows, and, besides, though he is very pleasant with you, he is a man of the world, and only cares for people when they are able to give him pleasure or do him service" Catherine Helen Spence, Hugh Lindsay's Guest, or This Author's Daughter (serialized in The Observer, 1867)

How they became engaged is a mystery, but it is likely that Gray and her father, John Stokes Bagshaw, who were of similar ages and arrived in the colony in the same year, knew each other well. Gray and Miss Bagshaw may have met at field days run by the Agricultural and Horticultural Society.

=== Last years ===
Gray enjoyed good health to the age of 80, then was forced by failing eyesight and susceptibility to winter cold to spend less and less time at his beloved sheep farm at the Reedbeds and more time at "Campden", the comfortable house on town acre 63 at the southern corner of Hindley Street and West Terrace which he had purchased half a century earlier. He became obsessed with death, and attended funerals of even the slightest acquaintance. He personally supervised the construction of a family vault at the West Terrace Cemetery. He drew up his will in 1890 and in the last years of his life appended five codicils, the third of which reduced the allowance to his wife, to whom he had become estranged, from £100 to £30 per annum. He gifted the extensive Reedbeds property to his five sons, his West Terrace property to his wife and daughter Jane, and his North Adelaide properties to daughters Bessie and Edith in order to avoid inheritance taxes. His remaining properties were willed for the benefit of his children, and then his grandchildren "share and share alike".

He died in the early Spring of 1896, and was interred in the vault, with a large attendance which included his friend the retired Rev. Woods, his doctor Benjamin Poulton (died 1921) and lawyer Moulden. The burial service was conducted by Woods' successor the Rev. Alexander Wilson. Beneficiaries of his Will included the Bacon School (see above), the Home for Incurables, the Institution for the Blind, Deaf and Dumb but, surprisingly, not the Children's Hospital, which had been the recipient of much of his largess while alive. His widow's allowance, whittled down in the third codicil, was restored to its original value by the lawyers.

== Other interests ==
- Gray was a member of the Agricultural and Horticultural Society from 1857, a committee member 1858 to 1862 or later, and was still exhibiting in 1892.
- He was in 1860 a founding member of the Reedbeds Cavalry, a unit of the South Australian Militia, and as Lieutenant Gray resigned in May 1861. His neighbours Gabriel Bennett and Charles and Samuel White were prominent members.
- In 1867 he made a voyage to Albany, Western Australia, hoping to negotiate purchase of large quantities of jarrah timber, but failed where M. C. Davies later succeeded, and built up a substantial business.
- In 1868 Gray purchased from Alexander Wearing two properties of 100 square miles (260 km^{2}) at the Head of the Bight, 100 miles (160 km) from Fowler's Bay on the western boundary of what is now Yalata community land. Gray knew of Eyre's description of extensive grassy plains and reckoned if only permanent water were found, he could make a fortune from the property. To that end he sent a party of workers, led by one William Marks, to dig a well. They spent six months chipping away at the obdurate rock, before Gray realised the futility of their effort and ceased operations. "Gray's Well", a shallow dry shaft, may still be seen today, close to Nullarbor Station homestead.
- He was chairman of the District Council of West Torrens at least 1868–1878, reportedly for twenty years. He had in 1862 been accused by longtime antagonist George Dew of membership of the Council for his own ends, notably the road which the council had run from Glenelg to "Frogmore".
- In 1869 he pulled down the old "Buck's Head" hotel (whose clientele consisted largely of salesmen and butchers from the market opposite) at 24 North Terrace (between Newmarket and Gray streets) and built a new one in its place, architect Daniel Garlick and builder Charles Farr.

He also owned the Foundry Hotel on the north-east corner of Hindley and Gray streets (Acre 60) and two smaller ones on the north side of Currie Street: the Yorke Peninsula Inn at c. 248 (Acre 123) and the Ship Inn at c. 190 (Acre 120).

- He was appointed Justice of the Peace in March 1869 to at least 1886.
- In 1873 he had a large interest in the Larrakeeyah Gold Mining Company and the Nina Reef Gold Mining Company, both Northern Territory prospects, but appears to have relinquished them later that year.
- He promoted W. H. Bean's successful candidature for the seat of West Torrens in 1878.
- He was in 1878 a promoter and director of the Holdfast Bay Railway Company, but had to resign the following year after a serious accident left him immobile.
- In 1885 he floated the Daly River Plantation Company to grow sugar cane, and purchased machinery from G. T. Bean's defunct Port Darwin Sugar Company at one tenth its purchase price, but in company with the De Lissa Sugar Company, this venture also failed.
- Gray was a longtime friend of B. A. Moulden, his lawyer, associate in many ventures, and co-executor of his Will.

== Places named for Gray and his family ==
- Gray Street, Adelaide
- Rosetta Street, West Croydon, was named for Mrs. Gray. It is intersected by Alfred Road and Herbert Road.
- Rosetta Street, Rosewater, previously Graytown, was named for Mrs. Gray. It runs between Edith Street and Gray Terrace.
- Bagshaw Crescent, and the suburb of Gray in Palmerston, Northern Territory, were named for Rosetta and W. H. Gray.

== Recognition ==
- The Gray Prize is, or was at least until 1977, awarded annually by Bacon's School, Bermondsey, England, in recognition of Gray's £300 bequest to the school.
- He is commemorated by a plaque on the North Terrace, Adelaide, footpath as part of the Jubilee 150 Walkway.

== Family ==
William Henry Gray (18 January 1808 – 6 September 1896) at age 53 married Rosetta Bagshaw (c. 1840 – 23 February 1918) on 16 January 1861. Among their children were:

- Jane Ellen "Janie" Gray (3 November 1861 – 1946) married Frederick Hammond Taylor ( – ) on 6 March 1884
- Franklin James Gray (17 December 1862 – 1953) married Elizabeth Chapman ( – 1926) in 1885

- Ulva Jean Gray (1891–1971) married Oskar Ludwig Hasenohr (1891–1971) in 1915
He married again, to Annie Catherine Day ( – 1948) in 1928

- Percy John Gray (1 August 1864 – 1950) married Louisa Smith ( – 1969) in 1896

- Walter Edwin Gray (1897 – 1971) married Marjory Lorna (Lorna Marjorie?) Trudgen (23 October 1899 – 13 December 1977) in 1923

- Herbert George Gray (17 April 1866 – 17 June 1945) married Emilie Smith ( – 1948) in 1886
- Alfred Fowler Gray (30 March 1868 – 1964) married Annie Frances Smith (c. 1864 – 2 March 1913) on 20 September 1890
- Elizabeth Alice "Bessie" Gray (17 March 1870 – 1958) married Luther Robert Scammell (1826 – 1910) in 1888
- Edith Clara Gray (6 March 1872 – ) married William Kuhnel, orig. Kühnel, (1862 – 18 April 1916) on 1 March 1892; He was a champion cyclist and piano merchant, had a home "Ranfurly" on Brougham Place, North Adelaide. They divorced 1910. The house, renamed "Lordello", was later owned by Sir Frank Moulden.
- Walter Edwin Gray (26 March 1876 – 6 September 1897) An invalid, he died on the first anniversary of his father's death.

Rosetta Gray married again, to William Wooding (c. 1841 – 16 September 1919) on 11 March 1911.

His sister Elizabeth, who travelled with him to South Australia, died an invalid in August 1839.
