= Members of the South Australian House of Assembly, 1868–1870 =

This is a list of members of the fifth parliament of the South Australian House of Assembly, which sat from 31 July 1868 until 2 March 1870. The members were elected at the 1868 colonial election.

Name	Electorate	Term in Office
Richard Andrews ^{[2]}	The Sturt	1857–1860, 1862–1870
Richard Baker	Barossa	1868–1871
George Thomas Bean ^{[3]}	West Torrens	1868–1870
Neville Blyth	Encounter Bay	1860–1867, 1868–1870, 1871, 1877–1878
David Bower	Port Adelaide	1865–1870, 1875–1887
James Boucaut	The Burra	1861–1862, 1865–1870, 1871–1878
Henry Bright	Stanley	1865–1884
John Carr	Noarlunga	1865–1879, 1881–1884
Wentworth Cavenagh	Yatala	1862–1875, 1875–1881
John Cheriton ^{[1]}	Mount Barker	1868, 1868–1871
John Colton	Noarlunga	1862–1870, 1875–1878, 1880–1887
Robert Cottrell	East Adelaide	1868–1875
John Dunn ^{[1]}	Mount Barker	1857–1868, 1868
William Everard	Mount Barker	1865–1870, 1871–1872
Daniel Fisher	East Torrens	1867–1870
Joseph Fisher	The Sturt	1868–1870
Henry Fuller	West Adelaide	1865–1870
Lavington Glyde	Yatala	1857–1875, 1877–1884
John Hart	Light	1857–1859, 1862–1866, 1868–1873
Alexander Hay	Gumeracha	1857–1861, 1867–1871
Henry Hill	Port Adelaide	1868–1870
Henry Kent Hughes	Victoria	1868–1875
George Kingston	Stanley	1857–1860, 1861–1880
William Lewis	Light	1868–1870
William Ranson Mortlock	Flinders	1868–1870, 1871–1875, 1878–1884
John Bentham Neales	The Burra	1857–1860, 1862–1870
George Pearce	East Torrens	1868–1870
John Pickering ^{[3]}	West Torrens	1865–1868, 1870, 1871–1878
Thomas Playford	Onkaparinga	1868–1871, 1875–1887, 1887–1890, 1899–1901
Hon Thomas Reynolds	East Adelaide	1857–1862, 1862, 1864–1870, 1871–1872, 1872–1873
John Riddoch	Victoria	1865–1870, 1871–1873
William Rogers ^{[1]}	Mount Barker	1858–1860, 1864–1865, 1868, 1868–1870, 1872–1875
William Sandover	Gumeracha	1868–1870
Philip Santo	Barossa	1860–1870
William Knox Simms	West Adelaide	1868–1870, 1871–1876, 1878–1881
Frederick Spicer ^{[2]}	The Sturt	1870
Augustine Stow	Flinders	1866–1868
Hon Henry Strangways	West Torrens	1858–1871
William Townsend	Onkaparinga	1857–1882
Alfred Watts	Flinders	1862–1866, 1868–1875

^{1} John Cheriton and William Rogers were initially declared elected as the two members for Mount Barker, but their election was challenged and they were unseated on 11 August 1868. Cheriton was re-elected in the resulting by-election on 3 September, but Rogers was defeated by John Dunn. Dunn's election was then challenged, and his election was voided on 9 October. Rogers then won a second by-election on 5 November.
^{2} The Sturt MHA Richard Andrews resigned on 18 January 1870. Frederick Spicer won the resulting by-election on 10 February.
^{3} The seat of West Torrens MHA was declared vacant on 20 January 1870 due to George Bean's non-attendance. John Pickering won the resulting by-election on 10 February.
