= Members of the South Australian House of Assembly, 1870–71 =

This is a list of members of the sixth parliament of the South Australian House of Assembly, which sat from 27 May 1870 until 23 November 1871. The members were elected at the 1870 colonial election.

Name	Electorate	Term in Office
Richard Baker	Barossa	1868–1871
William Henry Bean	West Torrens	1870–1871, 1878–1884
Hon Arthur Blyth	Gumeracha	1857–1868, 1870–1877
Neville Blyth ^{[3]}	Victoria	1860–1867, 1868–1870, 1871, 1877–1878
James Boucaut ^{[1]}	West Torrens	1861–1862, 1865–1870, 1871–1878
Henry Bright	Stanley	1865–1884
John Carr	Noarlunga	1865–1879, 1881–1884
Wentworth Cavenagh	Yatala	1862–1875, 1875–1881
John Cheriton	Mount Barker	1868, 1868–1871
Patrick Coglin	West Adelaide	1860–1868, 1870–1871, 1875–1881, 1882–1887
Robert Cottrell	East Adelaide	1868–1875
John Darling	West Adelaide	1870–1871, 1876–1881, 1885–1887
Walter Duffield	Barossa	1857–1868, 1870–1871
Hampton Gleeson	Flinders	1870–1871
Lavington Glyde	Yatala	1857–1875, 1877–1884
Edward Hamilton ^{[2]}	Light	1870–1871
John Hart	The Burra	1857–1859, 1862–1866, 1868–1873
Alexander Hay	East Torrens	1857–1861, 1867–1871
Henry Kent Hughes	Port Adelaide	1868–1875
Sir George Kingston	Stanley	1857–1860, 1861–1880
Friedrich Krichauff	Onkaparinga	1857–1858, 1870–1882, 1884–1890
Park Laurie	Victoria	1870–1871, 1873–1875
Arthur Fydell Lindsay	Encounter Bay	1857–1860, 1870–1871, 1873–1878
John Lindsay	The Sturt	1860–1865, 1870–1871
Charles Mann	The Burra	1870–1881
Henry Hay Mildred	East Torrens	1870–1871
David Murray	East Adelaide	1870–1871, 1877–1878, 1881, 1881
William Paltridge ^{[3]}	Victoria	1870–1871
James Pearce	Light	1870–1875
Thomas Playford	Onkaparinga	1868–1871, 1875–1887, 1887–1890, 1899–1901
William Quin	Port Adelaide	1870–1871, 1875–1880
James Garden Ramsay	Mount Barker	1870–1875, 1876–1878
James Stewart	Noarlunga	1870–1871
Hon Henry Strangways ^{[1]}	West Torrens	1858–1871
William Townsend	The Sturt	1857–1882
Ebenezer Ward	Gumeracha	1870–1880, 1881–1890
Alfred Watts	Flinders	1862–1866, 1868–1875
Emil Wentzel	Encounter Bay	1870–1871
James White ^{[2]}	Light	1871, 1875–1881

^{1} West Torrens MHA Henry Strangways resigned on 28 July 1871. James Boucaut won the resulting by-election on 10 August.
^{2} Light MHA Edward Hamilton resigned on 28 July 1871. James White won the resulting by-election on 12 August.
^{3} Victoria MHA William Paltridge resigned on 28 July 1871. Neville Blyth won the resulting by-election on 24 August.
