= Charles Farr (builder) =

19th century Australian businessperson

Charles Farr (c. 1812 – 25 February 1888) was a timber merchant and builder in the young colony of South Australia.

== History ==
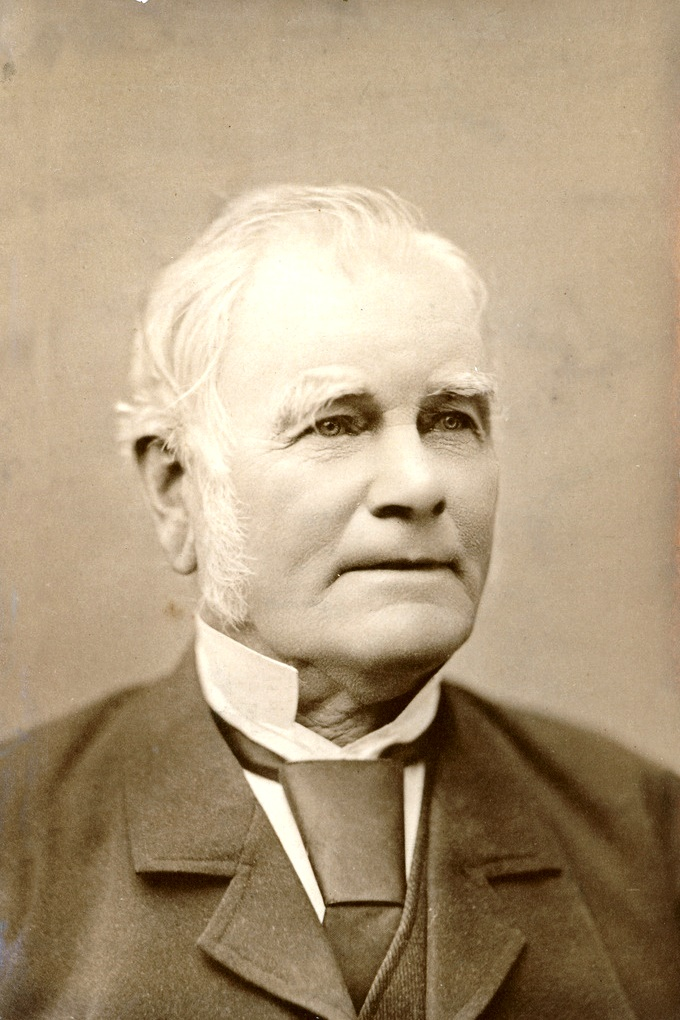
Charles Farr c. 1885

Farr emigrated to South Australia from Britain aboard D'Auvergne arriving in March 1839.

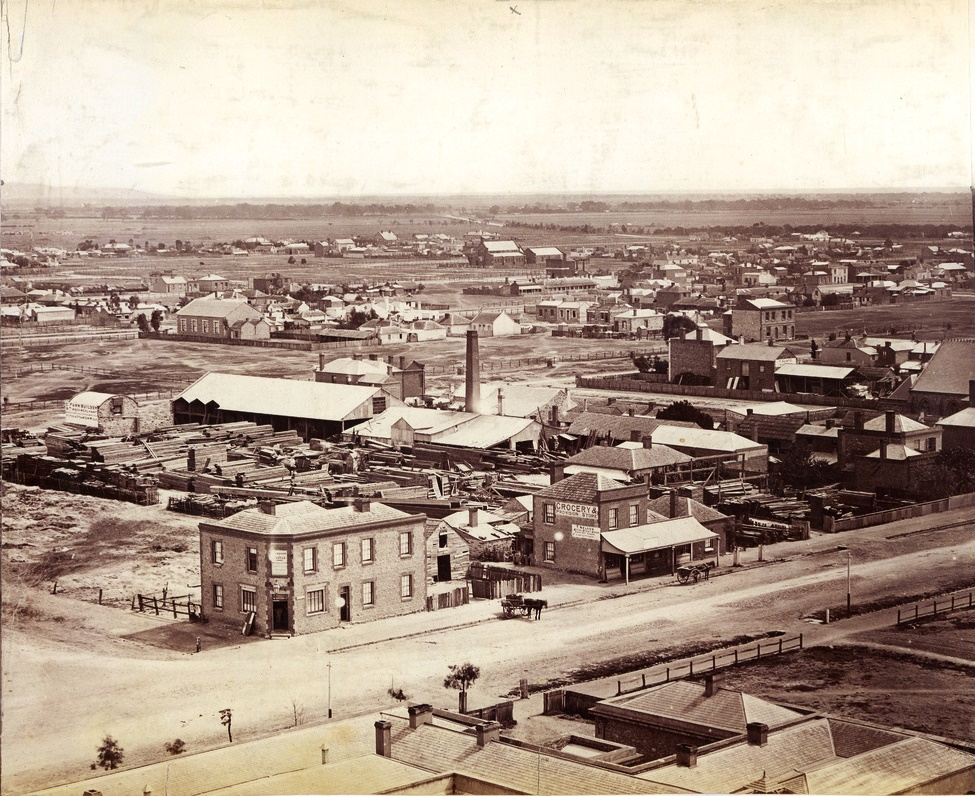
Portion Victoria Square and Franklin Street taken from the GPO tower in 1865. Farr's woodyard in middle foreground.

Farr, by trade a bricklayer, had premises on Hindley Street, and by 1850 owned a business on Franklin Street, a timber yard possibly purchased from Philip Santo. By 1868 he employed up to 115 men and his sawmill and timber yard, which employed around 35 men, extended over two acres between Franklin and Grote streets, and included the Farr residence. He later moved to Waymouth Street, then in 1883 moved to Grote Street, west of Brown Street. That same year he had a timber yard in Wakefield Street.

His two sons, who were educated at J. L. Young's Adelaide Educational Institution, were brought into the business, but later went their separate ways: Charles George was licensee of the Talbot Hotel, Gouger Street, then the International Hotel, Rundle Street; Alfred was city manager for Walter & Morris, who owned the Sarnia timber mills in Port Adelaide, and influential president of the Builders and Contractors' Association.

Farr died after several years an invalid. His remains were interred in the West Terrace Cemetery.

He evidently had good relations with the men in his employ, and paid skilled tradesmen slightly more than other employers; from 8/6d to 10s. per day. For twenty years his company was probably second only to English & Brown / Brown & Thompson, who owned the Glen Ewin quarry.

== Some works ==
Built	Name	Architect	Client	Location	Notes
1856	Head office	Edmund Wright	Union Bank	Pirie Street	Became "Union Hall", Adelaide headquarters of WCTU 1896, demolished 1925
1858	Church of the Immaculate Conception	G. S. Kingston	Catholic Church	Port Adelaide	
1859	Branch office	E. Wright	Bank of South Australia	Commercial Road, Port Adelaide	
1859	Branch office	E. Wright	Union Bank	Lipson Street, Port Adelaide	
1860	Head office	James Macgeorge	South Australian Savings Bank	King William Street	
1863	Coal store and retort house		SA Gas Company	Brompton	
1863–1869	Adelaide Town Hall	E. Wright; E. J. Woods	Adelaide City Council	King William Street	
1864	Chemist's shop	R. G. Thomas	Mrs. A. M. Bickford	Hindley Street	
1864	Warehouse	G. S. Kingston	George P. Harris	Gawler Place, Adelaide	became Harris Scarfe
1865	"Kingsmead House"	E. Wright, E. J. Woods	Charles Jacobs	75–78 Brougham Place	
1865	Athelney	E. Wright, E. J. Woods	P. D. Prankerd	Athelney Avenue, Kent Town	Peter Dodding Prankerd married Lucy Amelia Wright, sister of the architect. They sold Athelney to H. B. Hughes in 1874. Now part of St Peter's College
1866	Wine and spirit store	Daniel Garlick	S. R. Hall	King William Street	adjacent a similar store same owner and architect but built by English & Brown.
1867	Department store	G. S. Kingston	George P. Harris	Rundle Street	became Harris Scarfe
1868	Prince Alfred College	D. Garlick	Methodist Church	Dequetteville Terrace, Kent Town	foundation stone was laid by HRH Prince Alfred, Duke of Edinburgh, on 5 November 1867.
1869	Buck's Head Hotel	D. Garlick	W. H. Gray	North Terrace, Adelaide	rebuilt on same site
1868	Parkside Lunatic Asylum	D. Garlick	SA Government	cnr Greenhill and Brownhill Creek (now Fullarton) roads	
1868	York Hotel	D. Garlick		cnr Rundle & Pulteney streets	rebuilt on same site
1869	Norwood Baptist Church	James Cumming	Baptist Association	134 The Parade, Norwood	heritage-listed on the SA Heritage Register in 1982.
1871,1872	East, west wings	J. Cumming	Bushmen's Club	SE corner, Whitmore Square	sold to the Salvation Army (the current owner) in 1899
1871	Norwood Public School	J. Cumming	Education Department	The Parade, Norwood	
1871	Extension	G. S. Kingston	Bank of Australasia	King William Street	
1873	Residence	D. Garlick	Thomas Magarey	Mills Terrace, N.A.	
1875	"Kalymna"	T. English	C. A. Hornabrook	28 Dequetteville Tce, Kent Town	still stands, as "Oreon House"
1876	drapery shop	D. Garlick	T. Wilcox	cnr. Rundle & Pulteney streets	
1876	King's Head Hotel	T. English	W. Thomson	King William Street	rebuilt on same site
1877	Universal Buildings	T. English	L. A. Jessop; M. C. Davis	Grenfell Street	
1878	Blind, Deaf and Dumb Institution	T. English		Brighton Road, Brighton	New building in front of the old one, previously the "Grace Darling Hotel".
1878	Royal Admiral Hotel	T. English	C. Banbury	Hindley Street	rebuilt on same site
1878	extensions	D. Garlick	G. & R. Wills		
1879	Southern Cross Hotel	D. Garlick	William Chambers; F. J. Blades	King William Street	rebuilt on same site
1879	Clubhouse "Albert Hall"	G. R. Johnson	Deutsche Club	Pirie Street	sold to the Salvation Army in September 1898, and became its HQ, "Memorial Hall"
1879	stores	D. Garlick	J. Hodgkiss & Co.	Stephens Place, Adelaide	
1879	clubhouse	T. English	New South Australian Club	Pirie Street	Not to be confused with (Trew's) South Australian Club Hotel on North Terrace, this was an exclusive establishment comparable to the Adelaide Club. An earlier incarnation (1839–44) on Hindley Street, whose members included Sturt, Morphett and Fisher failed financially.
1880	Exchange Building / Queens Exchange	E. Wright; J. H. Reed		eastern corner, Pirie Street and Exchange Lane	"Commercial Union Building" demolished 1980
1880	Exchange Building	E. Wright	Exchange Land Company	Currie Street	
1882	Adelaide Swimming Baths		Adelaide City Council	King William Road	
1882	Warehouse	David Williams, jr.	Blackwell, Felstead, & Co.	Pirie Street, Adelaide	
1884	Clubhouse	Smeaton	YMCA	cnr. Grenfell Street and Gawler Place	
1885	Institute	R. Rees		Summertown	
1885	shops	D. Garlick	E & W. Hackett	Rundle Street	
1887	Western annexe, Jubilee Exhibition Building	Withall & Wells		North Terrace	for Adelaide Jubilee International Exhibition

== Family ==
Farr married Sophia Morris (c. 1813 – 19 March 1879) before leaving for South Australia. Their children were:

- Charlotte Farr (c. February 1839 – 4 September 1866) married Harry Bickford (1843–1927) on 24 February 1866. They had no children. He married again, on 10 March 1870 to Rosina Mary Ferguson (1845 – 5 October 1898). There was a dispute over a North Adelaide block given to Charlotte by Farr.
- Sophia Farr (1843 – 30 June 1918) died at the home of her sister Martha Laurence
- Charles George Farr (1845 – 1 April 1908) married Paruna Minnie Ann "Mina" Russell (c. 1863 – 4 August 1940) on 26 June 1879
- Alfred Farr (1847 – 29 May 1912) married Mary Prynn Sands ( – 7 March 1903) in 1865, lived on Hurtle Square. He married again in 1905 to Ann McInnes, died at Jaffrey Street, Parkside.

- Alfred John Farr ( – 1938) married Mary Lucy Greayer ( – ) on 20 May 1907

- Martha Farr (1849– ) married Walter Laurence ( – ) on 8 February 1871

- Walter James Laurence (1883–1907)

- Eliza Farr (1851 – 10 January 1930) died at Napier Terrace, Hawthorn

They had a home on Franklin Street, and from around 1880 on Grove Street, Unley Park, where he died. This residence may have previously been the property of Dugald Herschel Babbage.
