= William Henry Bean =

South Australian businessman and parliamentarian

Member of Parliament for South Australia
- In office 28th March, 1870 – 23rd November, 1871
- In office 2nd April 1878 – 19th March 1881
- In office 8th April 1881 – 19th March 1884

Justice of the Peace
- In office 1872–1874

Personal details
- Relations: George Thomas Bean (brother) Arthur Bean (Brother)

William Henry Bean (c. 1843 – date of death unknown) was a prominent South Australian businessman and parliamentarian.

He was first elected to the Sixth Parliament of the South Australian House of Assembly for the District of West Torrens on March 28, 1870, serving alongside Henry Strangways. His term lasted until November 23, 1871, when he lost his seat following the dissolution of Parliament.

Bean was later re-elected to the Ninth Parliament (1878–1881), this time serving with William James Magarey, from April 2, 1878 to March 19, 1881. He successfully retained his seat in the Tenth Parliament(1881–1884), serving alongside Frederick Estcourt Bucknall from April 8, 1881 to March 19, 1884. He did not contest the 1884 elections.

Bean's brother George Bean had held the seat previously and lost it under controversial circumstances. (Note: George had been refused leave and his seat was vacated due to his absence.) This is one of very few cases in Australia of a pair of brothers being parliamentarians.

He conducted the Adelaide affairs of Bean Brothers while George was overseas from 1869 to 1878. He also organised a large number of wool, hide, meat and bark shipments in partnership with H. J. Wilke.

He was appointed Justice of the Peace in 1872 but resigned in 1874.

W. H. Bean (with Wilke) bought into a gold discovery "Golding's Find" at Mount Torrens in 1870. and was a director in James Scott's "El Dorado" Mount Pleasant mine in 1872.

He was on the board of the South Australian Zoological and Acclimatization Society. He resigned or was dropped in 1884.

In 1884 Bean Brothers Limited successfully sued him in the Supreme Court for making unauthorised payments. He was declared insolvent in 1885.

He was in London at the time of his brother George's death in 1912.

== Notes ==
South Australian House of Assembly
Preceded by John Pickering	Member for West Torrens; 1870-1871; With: Henry Strangways	Succeeded by John Pickering
Preceded by John Pickering	Member for West Torrens; 1878-1884; With: William Magarey, Frederick Estcourt Bucknall	Succeeded by Arthur Harvey
