= Annie E. Ridley =

English author

- Born: 2 May 1839; Durham, England
- Died: December 1923; London, England
- Occupations: Writer, educator

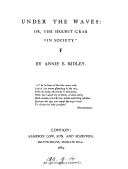
This is the title page of Under the waves: or, The hermit-crab 'in society' , Annie E. Ridley's first book published. It is a science book for children talking about different sea animals.

Annie E. Ridley (1839–1923) was a British Victorian era novelist who wrote books regarding women's education and a science book for children. Not only was Ridley an author, but she was the governor of the Camden School for Girls in London for twenty-four years. She was successful enough to own her own house. Ridley was also involved with the Headmistresses' Association and the Teacher's Guild. Ridley worked with Frances Mary Buss, a pioneer of women's education, and Ridley went on to inspire people like Ellice Hopkins.

== Life ==
Annie E. Ridley was born on 2 May 1839 in Houghton Le Spring, Durham, England, to John Ridley (1806–1887) and Mary White Pybus (1807–1884). At her birth, she had an older sister Mary Elizabeth Ridley who was born in 1836. When Annie was three months old her family moved to Hindmarsh, South Australia, Australia. Her father wanted to help colonize Australia and help make a great settlement. After a six-month voyage on the boat called the Warrior, the Ridley family arrived at Port Adelaide in Australia. From there they proceeded a few miles to Hindmarsh where they lived in a mud house while a wooden one was being constructed. Soon their new home was built with a fireplace, kitchen, dining room, bedrooms, and an office. However, three tragic events occurred. First, the oldest daughter, Mary Elizabeth, went too close to the fireplace and her clothes caught on fire. She died hours later from the severe Burns. Next, Mrs. Ridley gave birth to another daughter in 1843 (also named Mary Elizabeth) but that daughter died months later. Lastly, a son was born and he died soon after. This causes Annie to grow up without many Children her age.

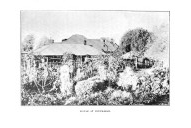
This is the house the Ridley family lived in while at Hindmarsh, South Australia.

Annie recalls that growing up in Australia caused her to view the world from a unique perspective. In the strange land of Australia, there were not many things to do. All she could do was play around in nature. She and her mother would plant Gardens with her mom explaining every type of plant. This sparked her interest in nature. In September 1845, Annie's little sister Jane Taylor Ridley was born in Hindmarsh, Australia. As her mother was now taking care of another little girl, this gave Annie more freedom to go outside and explore more.

Her father, John Ridley, planned to have his daughter learn through nature before ever picking up a book. In fact, he decided she would not touch a book until she was the age of seven. Ultimately, his plan ended two years early when Annie found herself wandering into a school near by her house and joining the class. This occurred when Annie was five years old marking the beginning of her schooling. Then at the age of twelve, Annie fell in love with reading after discovering Alfred Tennyson's poem The Princess. This poem inspired her then and in life to promote women's education.

In her book about her father's life, Annie goes on to explain how her father was her inspiration. He was always conducting science Experiments and as Annie got older, he invited her to join him. This further fostered her love of science. Around this time, the Ridley family, also bought some land by the bay. They would spend summer's here, and it allowed Annie to explore new Landscapes and new Animals. Annie thus started a journal to record all the things she was seeing and feeling. At one point she writes this down, "Papa says he hopes that when I am a woman I shall write a good book. I think myself that I would rather be a happy woman."

Finally, in 1853 the Ridley family returned to England on the ship called the Melbourne. Upon their return, Annie was immediately sent away to school. The head of the school was Miss Darke. While Annie was away at school, her father wrote her letters every week. Then in 1856, the Ridley family started to travel around Europe visiting Ireland, Germany, France and many other places. In 1858 they finally settled down in the Tyne valley near Hexham. Here they lived in a house called the Stagshaw Close House. They remained here till 1862.

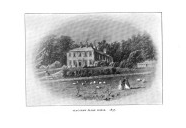
This is the Stagshaw Close House where the Ridley family lived in for a few years.

In 1862, the Ridley family moved to 19 Belsize Park, Hampstead, London, England. Then in 1865, Annie E, Ridley published her debut novel, Under the waves: or The hermit-crab 'in society'. This book marked her one and only science book for children. Then in 1868, Annie was baptized at the Christ Church in Hampstead, Camden, England.

In 1884, Annie's mother Mary White Pybus died. A couple years later in 1887 John Ridley died as well leaving Annie and Jane on their own. In 1889 the sisters commissioned the local Hampstead architect, Horace Field, to design a house for them at 31 Daleham Gardens, Hampstead, which they named Stagshaw.

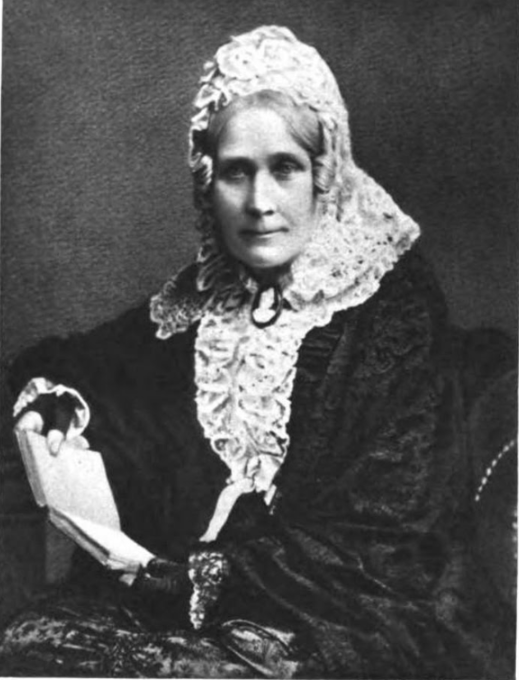
This is Mary White Pybus. She married John Ridley and is the mother of Annie Ridley.

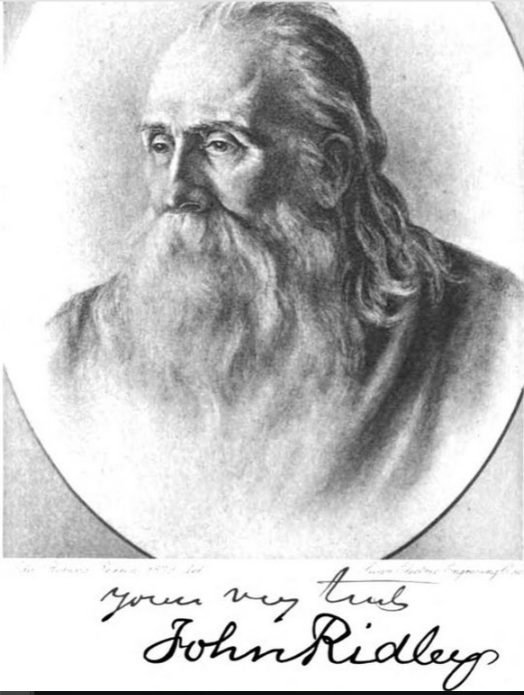
This John Ridley, the father of Annie E. Ridley.

== Works ==
- Under the waves: or, The hermit-crab 'in society'
- Better than Good. A story for girls ... Illustrated
- Thrift for Teachers. From "Work and Leisure," etc
- Frances Mary Buss and her work for education
- A Backward Glance: the story of John Ridley, a pioneer.
