= Donald McLean (pastoralist) =

Scottish-born Australian pastoralist (c.1780–1855)

- Born: c. 1780; Argyleshire, Scotland
- Died: 11 October 1855 (75 years); Strathalbyn, South Australia
- Spouse: Christina McPhee (m. 1810)
- Children: 11

Donald McLean (c.1780 – 11 October 1855) was a Scottish-born Australian pastoralist.

== History ==
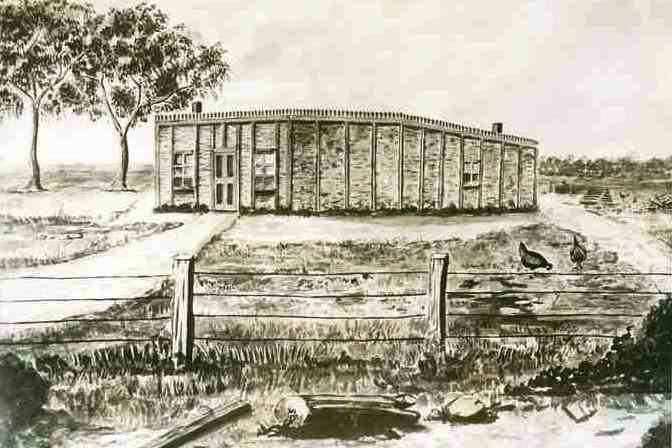
Sketch of Donald McLean's house at Hilton, where South Australia's first wheat was grown

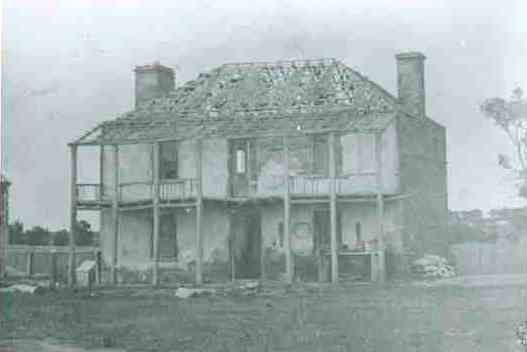
The old McLean home in Strathalbyn

McLean, a Scotsman from Duisky, near Blaich, Ardgour, Argyleshire, was in July 1837 an early investor with the South Australian Company; for his £1000 he was entitled to select one "town acre", one surveyed section near the city, and the option on one future special survey further away. His family were once substantial landowners, but he was reduced to the status of tenant farmer. He was clearly not without means however; £1000 would be equivalent to several million dollars today.

The 1836 famine in Scotland which led to one of the Highland Clearances may have been a factor in this decision, and to live in the new province. He and his large family emigrated on the Navarino, falsifying their ages and occupations in order to qualify for free passage. They arriving at Holdfast Bay on 6 December 1837. He selected "grid plan" number 57 on Hindley Street and Section 50, Hundred of Adelaide, an 80 acres (32 ha) property at Hilton, South Australia, a few miles from Adelaide, adjacent to one of Charles George Everard's selections. Immediately on arrival in South Australia he sent his son Allan to Van Diemen's Land (now Tasmania) to bring back a team of working buffalo, implements and seed wheat, which they planted and reaped by hand in 1838, arguably the first such crop in the colony. He built a modest house. Ten years later he sold the property to John Marles (c. 1817–1914); it is now the suburb Marleston.

He selected a property at Strathalbyn, part of the Angas Special Survey of 1841, and was the second settler there, after John Rankine. He built a two-storey house which he named either "Auchananda" or "Auchanada's", where he died on 11 October 1855.

== Wheat ==
McLean is generally credited with producing South Australia's first commercial crop of 20 acres of wheat in December 1838, but it is likely that others had domestic plots at home of small plantings around the same time. Dr. Everard had a small plot at his home on the corner of Hindley and Morphett Streets — the ground was hard and apparently infertile, but the experiment was successful, and heavy ears of grain were produced, to the discomfiture of his detractors.

Claims that eldest son Allan McLean was the first to plough land in South Australia on Donald Mcleans '80 acres (32 ha) at Hilton ([3a] with plough newly purchased in January 1838 from Tasmania), were refuted by John Chambers.

== Family ==
McLean married Christina McPhee (c. 1790 – 9 April 1869). Their children included:

- Allan McLean (12 February 1811 – 2 September 1890) married Catherine Dawson (c. 1825 – 21 January 1892) on 29 February 1844
- Ewen "Hugh the Elder" McLean (10 January 1814 – 30 May 1876) married Christina "Christy" Black (c. 1832 – February 1907) on 15 May 1849. He ran a farm near Milang, then Point McLeay, and retired to Meningie.
- John McLean (6 February 1816 – 14 December 1903) married (1) Mary Stacey (c. 1829 – 15 November 1872) on 25 September 1845, (2) Elizabeth Dixon (1834 – 29 November 1907) on 16 April 1874
- Mary McLean (2 April 1818 – 22 September 1889) married (1) Adam Abercrombie ( – 23 July 1849) (2) Duncan McRae (1826–1901)
- Archibald McLean (4 March 1821 – 31 January 1899) married Ann Soward Janeway (1828 – 19 March 1861) on 11 September 1846
- Ann McLean (c. 6 April 1823 – 21 October 1910) married (1) Robert Leslie (1818–1848) (2) Jeff Jeffreys (1832–1891)
- Rachel McLean (13 February 1825 – 20 August 1908) married Ewen "Hugh" McDonald (1818 – 14 July 1905)
- Margaret McLean (1827? 1828? – ?) married (1) James Keating (2) Richard Johns
- Jane McLean (16 August 1830 – 10 October 1886) married John Cheriton M.P. (10 December 1828 – 20 June 1917)
- Elizabeth McLean (1835–1907)
- Ewen "Little Hugh" "Hugh the Younger" McLean (26 May 1836 – 5 June 1921) married (1) Ann McBain (1838 – 2 February 1912) (2) Margaret Tannahill (c. 1843 – 8 April 1891) on 13 April 1862; lived "Sunny Brae", North Parade, Strathalbyn.

He died and was buried "nearby his home, "Auchanadala", Strathalbyn., Further Reference to Matthew Rankine's personal diary page 13th October 1855

Allan McLean, 19th premier of Victoria, was a relative.

He has been confused with another, possibly unrelated, Donald McLean (died before July 1914) who was manager of the North West Bend station on the River Murray for C. H. Armytage, and was the first in South Australia to create sheep paddocks. He pumped water for his flocks and also paid generous bounties for dingo scalps. He married Mary Barker, a niece of John Chambers, on 21 June 1866. In 1871, he and William Barker purchased Murbko station, on the River Murray opposite Morgan, then Comongin station near Quilpie.

== Sources ==
- E. M. Stevenson. "Donald and Christina McLean nee McPhee" (PDF). National Trust, Strathalbyn.
- E. M. Stevenson. "Biography of Christina "Chrissy" McLean nee Black and Ewen "Hugh the Elder" McLean" (PDF). National Trust, Strathalbyn.
- L. J. Mclean [x1] "Lands Department of SA-Archivist 2018-provided pre 1858 records....attached to www.christinaanddonaldmclean.com
- L J McLean [x2] "Reference to comments in Matthew Rankine's personal diary page dated 13th October 1855"
