= John Cheriton =

Australian politician

- Born: 10 December 1828; Whitestone near Exeter, Devon
- Died: 20 June 1917 (aged 88); Strathalbyn, South Australia
- Occupation(s): Farmer, politician

Member of the South Australian House of Assembly for Mount Barker
- In office 31 July 1868 – 11 August 1868
- In office 3 September 1868 – 2 March 1870

John Cheriton (10 December 1828 – 20 June 1917), born in Whitestone near Exeter, Devon was a pioneering farmer at Strathalbyn, South Australia, and a member of parliament in South Australia.

John arrived in South Australia on the Spartan on 12 April 1848, and for some time worked on a farm, having experience as the eldest son of a prominent farmer, then was for many years an auctioneer. In November, 1849, he married the youngest daughter of David McLean, who was one of the first farmers to grow wheat in South Australia. After his marriage he farmed at Penwortham before proceeding to Burra, where he worked for the Copper Company. In 1851 he left for the diggings, driving a team of bullocks from Adelaide to Ovens then to Melbourne. In 1853 he returned to Adelaide, and bought land at Angas Plains, where he farmed from 1853 to 1867, being the largest grower of wheat in the State at that time. He moved to Strathalbyn in July 1867, his son John Cheriton jun. taking over management of the Angas Plains property, and there he remained.

In 1868 he was elected as a member of the House of Assembly for Mount Barker, paired with John Dunn and after the dissolution in 1870 he was again elected, this time with J. G. Ramsay. He was unseated following appeal on 11 August 1868 but elected again at a by-election on 3 September. He was appointed Justice of the Peace in 1871. He was a prominent townsman in his time, but for many years he was too feeble to get about, and died in an invalid home.

== Interests ==
- He was an active member of the Strathalbyn Agricultural and Horticultural Society and its vice-president in 1866

== Family ==
He married Jane McLean (16 August 1830 – 10 October 1886), a daughter of pioneer Donald McLean in November 1849. Their family included:

- Christina Agnes "Di" Cheriton ( – 5 August 1881) married David Taylor Henderson ( – 30 July 1886) on 4 April 1877
- Susanna Ann "Susie" Cheriton (c. 1852 – 27 November 1905)
- John Cheriton, jun. (c. 1853 – 19 August 1940) married Mildred Jane McCord (c. 1854 – 14 October 1925) on 2 October 1878

- James Gordon Cheriton ( – 3 May 1917) a farm and stock broker, was killed in World War I
- John Cheriton Cheriton ( – ) married Maude Schulze ( – ) on 5 February 1910
- Graham Cheriton ( – ) married Laura Millicent Clark on 21 April 1917
