= John Stokes Bagshaw =

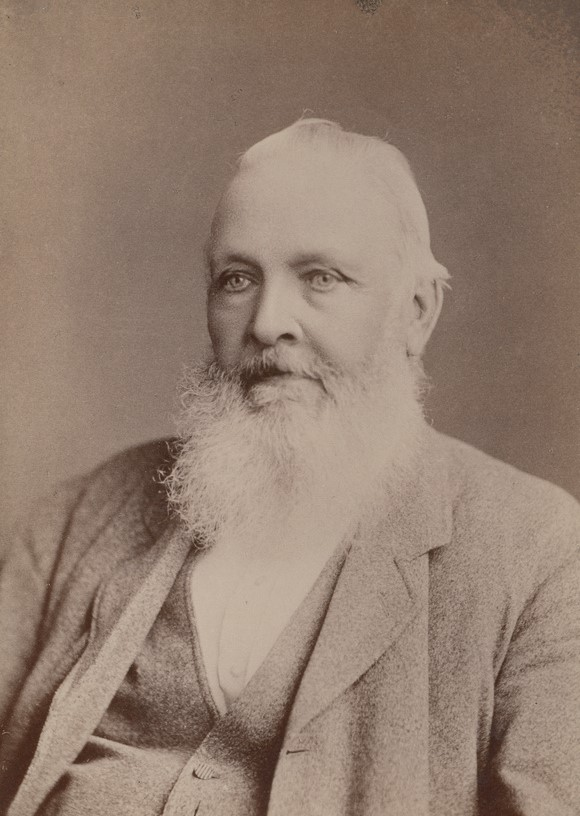

John Stokes Bagshaw (15 August 1808 – 1 January 1888) was an inventor and manufacturer of agricultural machinery in 19th century South Australia.

== Career ==
Bagshaw was born in Chetwynd, Shropshire, the son of Edward (19 May 1776 – 4 February 1889) and Margaret Bagshaw. He trained as a millwright, engineer and patternmaker and migrated to South Australia in 1838, arriving in the Eden at Port Adelaide in June 1837. He was involved in setting up flour mills at Noarlunga, Port Noarlunga and Encounter Bay. He set up a workshop in Elizabeth Street, Adelaide, making windmills. His first two sons, John Augustus and Thomas Henry joined the business. The business expanded into Crowther Street.

In addition to windmills, Bagshaw soon made horse ploughs, chaff cutters and corn crushers. In 1843 he won public recognition by building the world's first "stripper" harvesting machine for inventor John Ridley; it could strip 6 acres (2.4 hectares) of wheat a day. He then designed and produced the first winnowing machine in Australia. It became one of his company's specialities: more than two hundred were produced. Machinery for flour mills, pumping and drilling was gradually added to his firm's output. He also built baggers, elevators and mill machinery at his factory, which bore the name "Pioneer Works". In 1870, the company changed its name correspondingly.

Bagshaw's son, John Augustus Bagshaw, joined the business in 1852 and proved his father's equal in design and manufacture of farm machinery, taking out several patents and taking control of the company.

In 1893 the company demonstrated a greatly improved disk threshing header.

In 1910 a fire in the Adelaide factory forced the implementation of a long-planned move to Victoria Street, Mile End between King Street and Hilton Road, once a wheat paddock. In 1911 Thomas H. Bagshaw's two sons, Edward G. Bagshaw and Thomas Stokes Bagshaw, took over management of the company. With further expansion in its scope, the company manufactured wooden bodies of passenger cars for the South Australian Railways in 1919. In 1920, with the death of John A. Bagshaw, Vincent A. Zed (1885 – 15 August 1930), a long-time employee, was appointed governing director. (Note: This article contains much detail about the company.) In 1920 Bagshaws bought the Balaklava business of Illman and Sons. In 1924 the company was taken over by J.H. Horwood and Co. Ltd., and continued to operate as Horwood, Bagshaw Ltd.

== Interests ==
Bagshaw helped to found the Ancient London Order of Oddfellows in Adelaide.

He helped to found Trinity Church, later named Holy Trinity Church, on North Terrace, Adelaide.

He was elected to the Adelaide Municipal Council in 1870 and served as councillor for six years.

He was a member of the Royal Agricultural and Horticultural Society.

== Family ==
Bagshaw's only brother, William Edward Bagshaw jr. (about 1801? 1807? – 2 February 1889), was married to Ann (died 24 September 1873) and migrated to South Australia about 1860. In 1836 he married Jane Dale (c. 1811 – 27 February 1884); they arrived in South Australia on the Eden on 24 June 1838 with a daughter who was born in UK about 1837 and presumably died while young. Their home was "Chetwynd" in Franklin Street. Their children were:

- John Augustus Bagshaw (26 September 1838 – 22?23? May 1920) was one of the first Europeans born in South Australia. He was educated at James Jolly's school in Waymouth Street and the Pulteney Street School. He joined his father's business in 1852. He married Helen Drummond (c. 1838 – 30 October 1920) on 24 May 1869. Their home was "Crail Brae", Great Downing Street, Brighton. They only had one child, Nellie, who died on 21 September 1940. J. A. Bagshaw served as mayor of Brighton, was president of the Brighton Institute for 13 years, and was a longtime active member of the Royal Agricultural and Horticultural Society and the Chamber of Manufacturers.
- Georgina Bagshaw (1840 – 31 January 1928) never married.
- Rosetta Bagshaw (c. 1840 – 23 February 1918) married William Henry Gray (1808–1896) at the Adelaide Unitarian Christian Church, Wakefield Street. (Note: The three-decade disparity in their ages may have prompted fellow Unitarian Catherine Helen Spence to write Hugh Lindsay's Guest, serialised in The Observer in 1867.) Rosetta Street, West Croydon was named for her, as was Bagshaw Crescent and Rosetta Street in the Palmerston, Northern Territory suburb of Gray. She married again, to William Wooding (c. 1841 – 16 September 1919) on 11 March 1911.
- Indiana Jane Bagshaw (c. 1842 – 30 July 1884) married Robert Smith on 1 January 1864. She married again, to H. Dean on 14 March 1868. Their home was on Fisher Street, Fullarton.
- (Elizabeth Ann) Clara Bagshaw (c. 1843 or 1845 – 6 March 1902) married Thomas Duell on 12 June 1865.
- William Edward Bagshaw (c. 1850 – 7 July 1895) married Ellen Nicholl on 4 December 1874. He was a farmer at Morphett Vale, and had a home "The Dale", Plympton or Dalesford. He died after being thrown from his trap. Reginald Stokes Bagshaw (7 April 1889 – 12 January 1941) was one of his ten children.
- Thomas Henry Bagshaw (16 May 1856 – 20 March 1936) married Louisa Olive "Louie" Gray (27 January 1847 – 17 August 1934) on 16 June 1877. He was a partner in Bagshaw & Sons and for a time ran a farm in Clare. A keen fisherman, he retired to Port Noarlunga. There is no reason to believe Louie was related to her brother-in-law William Henry Gray.
  - Edward G. Bagshaw (10 July 1880 – ) succeeded his uncle John A. Bagshaw as managing director.
  - Thomas Stokes "Tom" Bagshaw (c. 1883 – 4 June 1951) married Annie Margaret Turnbull on 9 February 1905. Their homes were "Kuranda", Park Terrace, Wayville, then Laurel Avenue, Linden Park.
