= Thomas Magarey =

Australian politician (1825–1902)

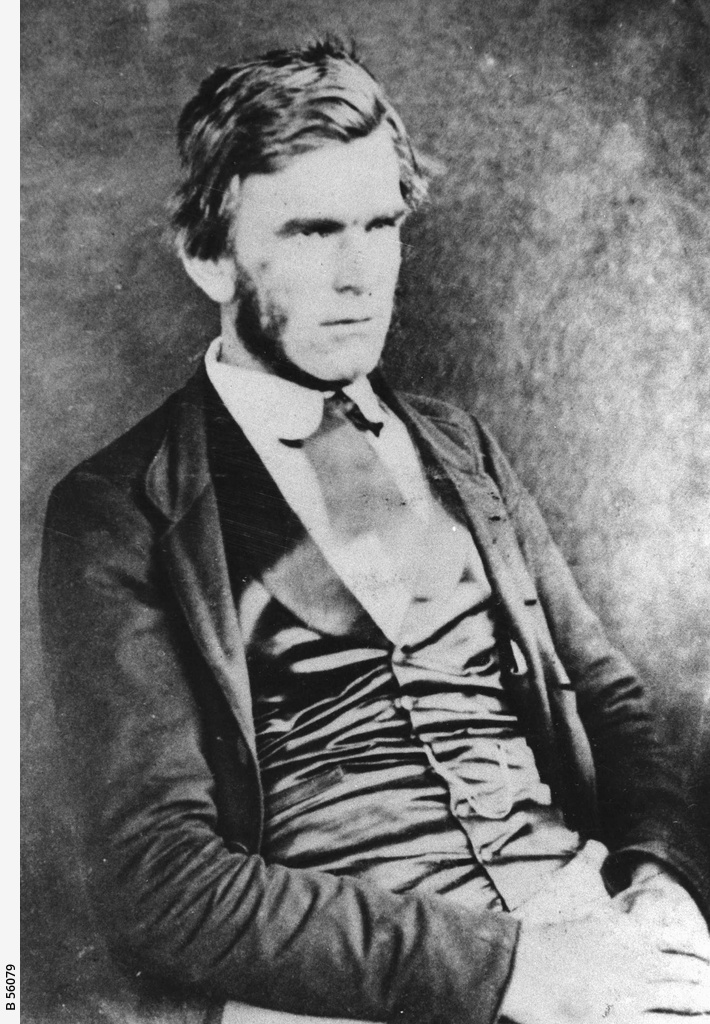
South Australian Pioneer Thomas Magarey, State Library of South Australia B-56079

Thomas Magarey (25 February 1825 – 31 August 1902) was an Irish-born miller and pastoralist who, with his brother James, migrated to Nelson, New Zealand in 1842 (aged 17), and to Adelaide, South Australia in 1845 (aged 20). He was also one of the Members of the South Australian House of Assembly, 1860–1862 for West Torrens, and one of the South Australian Legislative Council 1865–1867. He was intensely religious, setting up the first Church of Christ in Australia by 1849, and later joined the Plymouth Brethren, being interested in their writings since 1873.

== Life ==
Magarey was born in County Down, Ireland. He married Elizabeth Verco on 13 March 1848, first living at Noarlunga, then moving to Hindmarsh in 1849 where, with his brother James, he purchased the Hindmarsh flour-mill from John Ridley. In the 1850s he moved to Enfield. Elizabeth and Thomas had 10 children and many grandchildren. In 1880 he joined the Plymouth Brethren, leaving the Church of Christ. He was very public spirited "At quite an early stage of his life he had embarked on a project of acquiring blocks of land in the country, and renting them to struggling farmers, to whom he would give the right of purchase. Over the years he had the satisfaction of seeing a number of poor men become comparatively well-off landowners through their application and industry". In 1876 he contributed 100 guineas (£105) to help found the Adelaide Children's Hospital. In 1890 Magarey donated a fire engine to the Hindmarsh Volunteer Fire Brigade (presented on 9 November 1890). He died at his farm in Enfield on 31 August 1902.

== Family ==
Thomas Magarey married Elizabeth Verco (c. 1825 – 4 July 1920) on 13 March 1848.

- Alexander Thomas Magarey (10 March 1849 – 20 June 1906) was a foundation member of the Geographical Society of SA and a member of the Calvert expedition in which Wells and Jones died. He married Virginia Campbell of Bethany, West Virginia, USA.

- Archibald Campbell Magarey (1883–1919) was their only son.

- Dr Sylvanus James Magarey (21 October 1850 – 24 March 1901) sat in the Legislative Council for the Central district from May 1888 to April 1897. He was a noted surgeon with close connections to the Adelaide Children's Hospital, and religious teetotaller; one of the founders of the Church of Christ in Australia.
- Jane Ashley Magarey (1852–1871)
- Bertha Verco Magarey (1854–1933) married William Norman in 1880
- James William Magarey (1857–1934) married Helen Mary Attiwill (c. 1860 – 2 February 1950) on 23 April 1879.
- Thomas Charles Alfred Magarey (1859–1923)
- Elizabeth Philippa Magarey (15 June 1861 – 28 January 1940) married John Winder (c. 1851 – 17 June 1939) on 4 December 1912, lived at Strathfield, New South Wales
- Dr Cromwell Magarey (1864–1940) was one of the first four graduates of the Adelaide Medical School and father of Dr Ivan S. Magarey,

- Dr Frank William Ashley Magarey (1877–1912) married Louise Koeppen Henderson in 1907

- Ellen Lucy Magarey (1866–1938) married Charles Sidney Scutt in 1903.

His brother James Magarey (c. 1818 – 11 August 1859) ran Gannawarra Station on Gunbower Creek (a tributary of the River Murray), later owned a flour mill in Hindmarsh, South Australia, then moved to "Laurel Bank Villa", Geelong, Victoria. He drowned following the wreck of the SS Admella. His son, William James Magarey (1840 – 15 December 1920), worked on the station, moved to Geelong with his father; owned flour mills at Hindmarsh and Port Pirie, and sat in the House of Assembly seat of West Torrens from April 1878 to March 1881.

His great nephew (son of William James Magarey) was lawyer and sportsman William Ashley Magarey (30 January 1868 – 18 October 1929) who created the Magarey Medal, an annual award for the best and fairest player in the Australian Rules competition in South Australia.
