= Loch Bredan (barque) =

British sailing ship known for 1903 disappearance

History

United Kingdom
- Name: Loch Bredan
- Owner: Sproat & Company
- Builder: Dobie & Company Govan
- Yard number: 121
- Launched: 1882
- In service: 1883
- Fate: Lost at sea ca. November 1903

General characteristics
- Class & type: Cargo
- Tons burthen: 950 tons
- Propulsion: Sail
- Sail plan: 3-masted barque
- Complement: 20 crew

Loch Bredan was a British sailing ship built in Glasgow in 1882 which disappeared without trace with all hands around November 1903.

== History ==
The Loch Bredan was a steel-hulled barque of the "Loch" ships of the Sproat Line of Liverpool designed as an ocean-going cargo ship. She first arrived in Australia at Watsons Bay, Sydney on 25 November 1891, having left Antwerp on 11 August under command of Captain R. Cumming.

In 1902 she was forced to return to port a fortnight after leaving Sydney on her return journey, having run into such severe weather that three lifeboats were smashed and the ship's galley stove in.

There were grave fears for the vessel's safety on her 1903 voyage from Liverpool to Hobart under Captain T Williams, as she appeared to be around two weeks overdue. Those fears were groundless, as she had been simply held up by unfavourable weather.

== Last voyage ==
She left Adelaide in September 1903, having picked up a few crew and a cargo of compressed fodder.

In early 1904 speculation and concern about the missing ship appeared in the press. She was never heard from again and no scrap of wreckage was ever found. The crew consisted of :— Thomas Williams (master), J. M. Scott (first mate), G. Howell (second mate), J. A. Gibbons (carpenter), C. L. Williams (sailmaker), W. Williams (cook and steward), A. Gaerkens, H. Skinner, D. Friel, T. Williams, T. T. Gunn, J. L. James, G. Hartfield, L. J. Monoghan, C. Burns, S.Thomas (boy). The captain's wife (Mrs. Williams) was also on the articles as stewardess. Five men: N. M. McKenzie, F. Bucknall. R. Leppar, C. Nelson, joined the vessel at Port Adelaide. F. Bucknall was the son of Frederick Estcourt Bucknall, a former parliamentarian, brewer and real estate developer who lost his fortune in a recent recession.

== See also ==
- List of people who disappeared mysteriously at sea
