= Benjamin Taylor (Australian politician) =

Australian politician

Benjamin Taylor (c. 1843 – 31 December 1886) was an accountant and politician in the colony of South Australia.

He arrived in South Australia with his father in 1855 and attended St. Peter's College then worked as accountant for one of the big Adelaide firms, then for his father's fellmongery business in Thebarton, which became Taylor Bros., (Benjamin Taylor, Joseph Taylor and William Haigh Taylor). Taylor's Bridge (where John Street, now South Road, crossed the Torrens) was named for their business. The company was a major employer in the area, but also a malodorous polluter of the Torrens, along with similar companies Bean Brothers, W. Peacock & Sons and their successors G. H. Michell & Sons, W. H. Burford & Sons, Crompton and Sons and others.

He was the first mayor of the Town of Hindmarsh, then of the Town of Thebarton when it became a separate entity. He was for 20 years choirmaster of the Anglican All Saints' Church, Hindmarsh, and with his brothers donated the McKenzie organ to that church in 1881.

He was a member of the South Australian House of Assembly for the seat of West Torrens from February 1875 to September 1876.

Taylor Bros. declared insolvency in 1884; Benjamin came in for particular criticism for having made false representations to the bank.

He died of peritonitis at Robe on 31 December 1886 (aged 43). His wife Jessie Louisa (c. 1842 – 7 December 1886) had died only three weeks previously.
