= Bean Brothers =

Australian company

Bean Brothers was a company based in Adelaide, South Australia involved in tanning, leathergoods and shipping ventures in the latter half of the 19th century. Bean Brothers Ltd was set up by the principals to consolidate their assets and develop as wool and produce brokers. They also founded the Adelaide and Port Darwin Sugar Company to develop a sugar plantation in the Northern Territory of Australia. Both ventures failed amid acrimony, recrimination and lawsuits.

The firm of Bean Brothers were leather, wool and produce brokers. In 1882 its principals floated a company Bean Brothers Limited to take over their assets.

== Leather goods ==
Robert Laundy Ingham and George Bean Snr. established the Thebarton Tannery in competition with William Peacock. In 1839 the partnership was dissolved and Bean Snr. took over the business. In 1840 Bean Snr. opened a shop in Hindley Street previously held by a Mr Crabb, and a year later moved to premises vacated by the firm of Grieve & Campbell on Rundle Street. He was declared insolvent in 1859. A creditor, ex-employee Carl Schoening, charged that Mr Bean withheld cash transactions from the accounts books. Other books which might have supported his claims were not to be found. At this time all three sons were in his employ.

He passed the tannery on to son William H. Bean in 1860. and moved to Sandhurst, Victoria (now named Bendigo), where he was jailed for bankruptcy. In 1861 G. T. Bean, W. H. Bean and Arthur Bean opened as Bean Brothers in larger premises at 108 Hindley Street, retaining the tannery and grindery at Torrensville. "On 20th January 1865 William Henry Bean, George Thomas Bean and Arthur Bean, of Torrenside, Tanners, were granted Title to 15 acres, part of Section 46 embracing the whole of the area later covered by Fauldings’ premises in Reid Street..." The adjacent Beans Road (now part of Dew Street) may have been named for them. They commenced making shoe and boot uppers, and by the end of 1865 had 14 workers so engaged in King William Street, in part of the building owned by J. Clarkson & Co.

They moved offices to King William Street early 1867 with Arthur handling the retail trade at No. 25 and G. T. Bean at the wholesale business at No. 27, while W. H Bean handled the import of leathergoods, hides and tanning materials. Arthur bought the retail business in April 1867 and the wholesale side in September 1867. On 26 November there was a major fire in the retail shop, determined at an inquest by the Supreme Court as almost certainly arson. Certain inconsistencies of evidence made G. T. Bean the prime suspect, but nothing could be proved. Sometime before 15 September 1868 Arthur sold the business to H. G. Crocker & Co. which was taken over before 4 June 1869 by F. Fischer. This company was affected by another fire, in December 1870, this time originating in the adjoining Adelaide Photographic Company's premises.

== Shipping ==
While Bean Brothers were running the tannery and leathergoods shop and factory, they were purchasing much of their hides and leather and other materials through agents, then seeing the commercial opportunities in exporting wattle-bark to tanneries in Great Britain, concentrated on that business. At first they were sending consignments as regular cargo but by 1869 they were chartering ships to export the bark from Yankalilla via Normanville, South Australia for London. and by 1870 were exporting all the wattle-bark they could obtain. In one year they shipped 8,000 tons of bark, at prices ranging from £10 to £13 a ton.

In 1871 they purchased and refitted the 560 ton Joshua Bates and appointed Captain Thomas Bicknell to ship bark to London with a back-cargo of timber. Before it could make its first voyage, the ship was set fire by a disgruntled crewman, E. W. Holloway.

Other ships owned or managed by Bean Brothers were the steamer Kura, the Brigantines Nightingale and Mary Bannatyne, the brig African Maid, and schooners St. Kilda (three-masted), Prosperity, Stephen, Lady Darling, and Io.

From 1877 they produced a monthly circular containing information as here on demand and prices for wool, skins and bark.

== Sugar in the Northern Territory ==
In 1881 G. T. Bean floated a company Adelaide and Port Darwin Sugar Company to establish sugar plantations in the Northern Territory. In 1882 he set up a trial sugar plantation on Cox's Peninsula (later Cox Peninsula) across Darwin Harbour from Port Darwin, and organised the hire of 2,000 Singapore Chinese labourers to work the field at £1 per week. Investors included Benjamin Cohen De Lissa of Queensland (and after whom the Cox Peninsula suburb and town Delissaville (now Belyuen ) and the nearby Delissaville airstrip were named), G. T Bean, W. H. Bean, Arthur Bean, Luther Scammell, George Scarfe and F. W. Stokes. Housing was erected, many cane tubers were supplied by the Government botanist M. W. Holtze from the nursery at Fannie Bay, many more ordered from Queensland and locally and a mill was erected by the Delissa Pioneer Sugar Company. DeLissa, who had been appointed supervisor for his sugar plantation experience, made a trial crushing of 30 tons of cane in December 1881 which returned very little sugar. DeLissa quit in 1882, citing interference by G. T. Bean, who was scathing in his denunciation of DeLissa. W. H. Thompson was brought from Antigua to take over management of the plantations. The machinery was bought for a tenth of its original £6,000 by W. H. Gray, for his Daly River Plantation Company but his plantation also failed, and it was left to rust away. In 1885 the 100,000 acre lease was resumed for non-compliance with the conditions. G. T. Bean was criticised for spending Adelaide and Port Darwin Sugar Company money on worthless land without due diligence, over-extending his stay in London and overspending his allowance there.

== Bean Brothers Ltd ==
In 1882 Bean Brothers floated Bean Brothers Limited wool and produce brokers with initial subscription of 6,000 £10 shares and total capital of £100,000. Its purpose was to acquire the assets of Bean Brothers (including properties in Grenfell Street, Coromandel Place and French Street) and continue their business as commission agents. Founding directors were W. B. Rounsevell, M.P., Robert Darling, J.P., of Mundoora, W. K. Simms, J.P., John Hill, Seth Ferry, F. E. Bucknall, M.P., and William Whinham of Mount Gambier with W. H. Bean as manager. But two years later the company collapsed among a series of lawsuits, notably that in the Supreme Court against G. W. Bean for over £2000. At a shareholders' meeting it was revealed that it was necessary to make a call of £1 per share to pay creditors. The two brothers were insolvent and owed the company money, but were out of South Australian jurisdiction (G. T. Bean being in England and W. H. Bean in Melbourne). Among the causes for the company's collapse was W. H. Bean's unauthorised purchases on company cheques (speculating on chaff for instance). Nor had W. H. Bean maintained the books properly. At the shareholders' meeting anger was expressed that the liquidator, Mr C. Schlumberger, appeared to side with the company principals, not the ordinary shareholder who stood to lose the whole of their investment. The company went into voluntary liquidation in 1885.

== Family ==
George Bean (c.1805 – 25 April 1869), tanner, founder of a tannery and grindery on banks of River Torrens at Torrensville, and a "colonist of 32 years" was married to Ann, who was accidentally killed on 17 September 1862 Among their family were:

- Lavinia Annette Bean (1837 – 9 July 1904) married Luther Scammell (c. 1826 – March 1910) on 5 February 1856. He was owner of F. H. Faulding & Co.

- William J. Scammell (26 October 1856 – 19 April 1928) with F. H. Faulding & Co
- Luther Robert Scammell FCS LSA (20 March 1858 – 8 April 1940) with F. H. Faulding & Co
- Francis George Scammell (1861– ), solicitor
- Ernest Arthur Scammell (1865– ), in Queensland
- Lavinia Mary "Minnie" Scammell (1859 – 8 July 1915)
- Annette Emily Scammell (1866– ) married Stanley De Laire Newton in 1901, moved to Western Australia
- Florence Euphemia Scammell (1868– ) married Alfred Corker Minchin in 1888

- William Henry "W. H." Bean (1843– )
- George Thomas "G. T." Bean (1843 – 25 February 1912)
- Arthur Bate Bean (1845–) married Rosa Elizabeth Williams (died 1917) on 7 June 1866.

- Ann Letitia Maria Bean (9 May 1867 – ) born at St. Marys, married Leonard Harvey Gresham in 1894
- Lilla Elizabeth Bean (17 April 1869 – ) born at "Bleak House", St. Marys, married Linton Hall Swann in 1903
- Selina Lavinia Bean (23 July 1871 – 1872) born at St. Mary's
- Walter Arthur Wickham Bean (16 April 1873 – 1952) born at North Adelaide, married Clara Adelaide Twining Astles (c. 1875 – January 1902) who died in childbirth aged 26.
- Harold Leonard Bean (1875 – 13 February 1892) died at Cathedral Lodge, Pennington Terrace, aged 16
- Florence Rosa Bean (18 May 1878 – 1962) born at St. Marys
- Clarence Percival Bean (21 June 1880 – )
- Reginald Harvey Bean (4 January 1884 – ) born at "Bleak House", St. Marys
- Douglas Hurtle Bean (6 August 1890 – )

=== Arthur Bean ===
Another brother, Arthur Bate Bean, was often a partner in George's business enterprises.

He too was educated at J. L. Young's Adelaide Educational Institution,

He was the driver of a dogcart which overturned, killing his mother Ann. James McEnhill, whose runaway horses upset the carriage, was found not guilty of manslaughter.

He married Rosa Elizabeth Williams in 1866. They had at least eight children and she died 10 June 1917

From some time before 1867 they lived at "Bleak House", a substantial property on South Road, St Mary's. In 1882 he was found to have acted deceptively in attempting in 1880 to persuade Miss Selina Rogers of Tusmore to sell her nearby property "Sarnia" to one Ernest Alfred Leonard of Western Australia at a price around half its market value. It is not clear what Arthur's motives may have been, but in September 1882 he sold off much of his effects. In 1893 he sold "Bleak House".

He was living at Sussex Street, Glenelg from at least 1902 to 1904.

In 1907 he was boarding and keeping shop at 235 Forbes Street Sydney under the alias "Henry Louis Burton". In 1918 he was residing in Cathedral Street, Woolloomooloo.

Arthur's son, Walter W. Bean took over the Hindmarsh tannery and leatherware shop at 158 Rundle Street in 1898.
