= Arthur Ware =

Australian politician (1861–1927)

Arthur Ware CMG
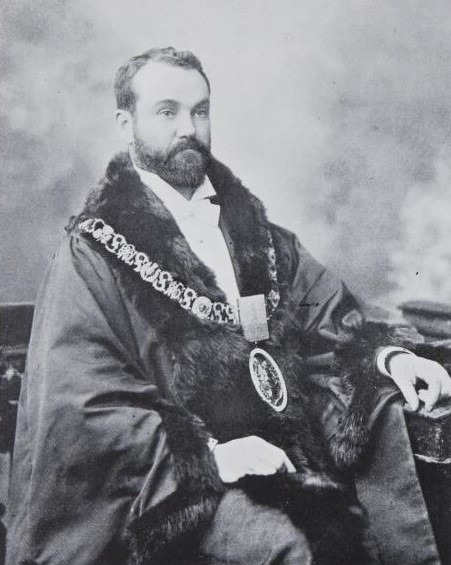

Mayor of Adelaide
- In office 1898–1901

Personal details
- Born: 1861; Kooringa, South Australia
- Died: 29 January 1927
- Occupation: brewer

Arthur Wellington Ware CMG (1861 – 29 January 1927) was a brewer and Mayor of Adelaide from 1898 to 1901 and a publican in both South Australia and Queensland.

== History ==
Ware was born in Kooringa, the eldest son of Fanny (née Crawford) and Charles James Ware, who ran the Burra Hotel. He came to Adelaide with his parents in 1868, when they took over the Exchange Hotel, then owned by Sir Henry Ayers. He was educated at John L. Young's Adelaide Educational Institution and at Whinham College. After leaving school he was apprenticed to the locomotive department of the South Australian Railways, but left the service to work in Harrold Brothers' hardware store, where he met with a serious accident, and was forced to resign. On his recovery he helped his mother manage the Exchange Hotel. He and his brother Tom Ware, as A. W. & T. L. Ware & Co., founded the Torrensside Brewery, which absorbed the East Adelaide Brewery, then was amalgamated with the Walkerville Brewery, which the brothers managed successfully, with the Torrensside site later becoming Southwark Brewery. When W. Piper secured the lease of the Exchange Hotel, Ware agreed to remain with him a year, and it was on the expiration of that period that he retired from business.

In the early 1890s he was elected to the Gawler Ward of the Adelaide City Council and served two years, and after a break returned as an alderman. He was mayor during the South African war, when he organised various patriotic efforts, and for the Royal visit, when he officiated at various ceremonies.

In April 1902, he and Mrs. Ware left for London to witness the Coronation and for a tour of Europe. While in London, he had a medical operation to relieve the leg injury which had caused him incapacity for so many years.

In 1909 Ware left Adelaide for Queensland, where he purchased "Brookstead" station, near Wondai, which he sold by subdivision in 1912.

In 1913 he stood, unsuccessfully, for a position on the Maryborough council, but was elected president of the Maryborough Licensed Victuallers' Association later that same year. He was subsequently granted the licence for the Royal Hotel, which licence he transferred to Andrew Kneath in May 1915. In 1914 the Pacific Hotel in Southport, Queensland. His wife died on 29 November 1915, and he remained there, managing the hotel until around May 1916. By 1919 he had returned to Prospect, South Australia. He moved to Wondai, Queensland in 1925, where he acted as manager of the Wondai Hotel until his death.

== Other interests ==
He also entered wholeheartedly into the sporting life of Adelaide. Although prevented by his leg injury from active participation, he was a liberal patron of nearly every sport; racing, cricket, footbaii, coursing, rifle shooting, and lacrosse. He served as chairman of the committee of Tattersalls Racing Club for three years, and was for many years an executive officer of that, and the Adelaide Racing Club. Both clubs made him a life member in appreciation of his services.

== Recognition ==
He was appointed a Companion of the Order of St Michael and St George (CMG) on 15 May 1901, in preparation for the forthcoming royal visit of the Duke and Duchess of Cornwall and York (later King George V and Queen Mary)

== Family ==
He married Rosa Henrietta Haussen (2 November 1860 – 29 November 1915) daughter of Henry Haussen and adopted daughter of Frederick Estcourt Bucknall on 11 March 1884

He died at a private hospital in Wondai, Queensland a week after being admitted. He had been suffering ill-health for some time. They had four daughters: (Vera) March Ware (Mrs. George Isbister Mowat), Fanny Filmer Ware (Mrs. Williford Hood) of Queensland, Daphne Haussen Claxton Ware ( –1928) (Mrs Howard Brougham Claxton) of Cadell, South Australia, and Madeline Rosa Ware (Mrs William Jorgensen) of Adelaide, and two sons Thomas Sefton "Tom" Ware MC, with Dalgety & Company, Brisbane, and Charles James Ware, with Adelaide's Municipal Tramways Trust. (Charles) Boxer Ware ( – 23 July 1932), chairman of directors Walkerville Brewery and mayor of Thebarton; and George J. Ware of Adelaide, were brothers, and ran the Exchange Hotel.
