= John Pickering (Australian politician) =

Australian politician

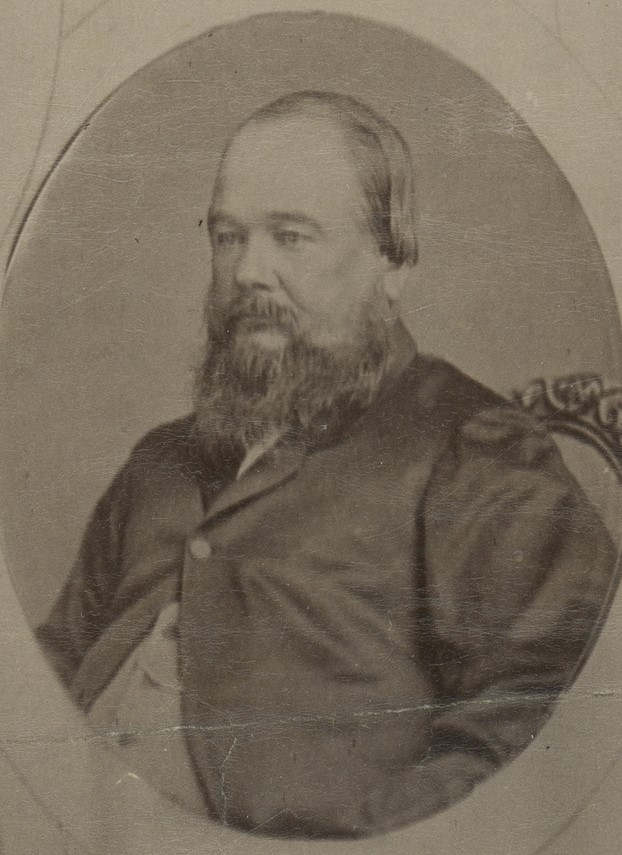

Member of Parliament for South Australia
- In office 09 Mar 1865 – 20 Apr 1868
- In office 10 Feb 1870 – 27 Mar 1870
- In office 14 Dec 1871 – 01 Apr 1878

Member of the South Australian Legislative Council
- In office 20 Apr 1881 – 19 May 1888

Personal details
- Born: 1 May 1814
- Died: 15 October 1891 (aged 77)
- Children: John Pickering Jun.

John Pickering (1 May 1814 – 15 October 1891) was a politician in the early days of the colony of South Australia.

== History ==
Pickering was born in Ashborne, Warwickshire, England and trained as a carpenter in Leamington after working for some time at a coalyard. He left England for Australia on the Asia, arriving in July 1839. He found ready employment and by 1849 and owned two lots on the Port Road, Hindmarsh and a timber merchant's business. In 1851 he joined the gold rush to Victoria, and within a few years returned to Hindmarsh sufficiently wealthy to give up active business life.

== Politics ==
He served on the Hindmarsh District Council from 1857 to 1866 and had a year each as Chairman and Treasurer. He was, with H. Quarterly, Francis Hunwick, Luther Scammell and John Gibson behind the formation of the Hindmarsh Institute. He entered Parliament in March, 1865, representing West Torrens in the House of Assembly, with H. B. T. Strangways as his colleague. He lost his seat at the 1868 election but succeeded at the February 1870 by-election called to replace George Bean, was defeated at the 1870 election, but didn't have long to wait before the 1871 election, when he was again successful, and held the seat until 1878, when he was defeated by a handful of votes.

In 1881 he was successful in winning one of the six vacant seats in the Legislative Council and retired in 1888. He was appointed Justice of the Peace.

== Church ==
Pickering was a staunch Congregationalist, and helped build the "Mud Chapel" on the opposite side of Orsmond (then Roberts) Street from the present chapel, alongside Crawford's Hindmarsh Brewery. He was a teetotaller, a prominent worker for the Temperance movement and a member of the British and Foreign Bible Society.

== Family ==
Pickering was married He lived his whole life in Hindmarsh and died at his son's residence in Bacon Street, Hindmarsh after an illness lasting several weeks. They had one son:

- John Pickering Jun. (ca.1849 – 19 February 1921) was a senior officer with the Railways and a prominent cricketer with the Hindmarsh, then Norwood Clubs, and helped found the South Australian Cricket Association, and was its first Secretary, from 1871 to 1873.
