= Frank Hourigan =

Australian politician

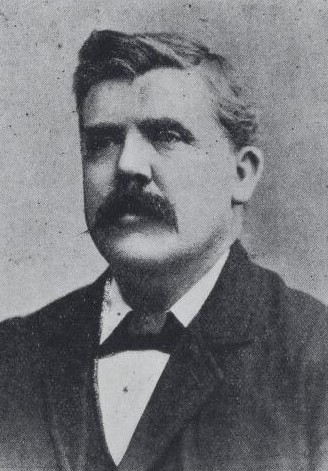

Francis John Hourigan (27 May 1852 – 1 December 1901) was an Australian politician who represented the South Australian House of Assembly multi-member seat of West Torrens from 1893 to 1901 for the United Labor Party.

Hourigan was born in Limerick, Ireland, and migrated to Australia with his family in 1859. They lived at North Adelaide for a period before settling at Hindmarsh. A tanner by trade, he was the first president of the Tanners and Curriers' Union for eighteen months from September 1889, and served in that role during their six-week 1890 strike for an eight-hour day. He was subsequently appointed by the union to serve as their advocate when the matter went to arbitration, which was resolved in the workers' favour. He served as president of the United Trades and Labour Council of South Australia and the Working Men's Association at North Adelaide, and was a Town of Hindmarsh councillor for four years.

He was elected to the House of Assembly at the 1893 election as a Labor member, and was re-elected in 1896 and 1899. He died in office in December 1901 from a hemorrhage of the stomach at age 49 and was buried in the Catholic section of the West Terrace Cemetery. The Southern Cross referred to him upon his death as "one of the most popular members of the House", "one of the ablest debaters in the House", and a member "greatly respected for his unfailing courtesy and suavity of manner". Leader of the Opposition Robert Homburg, a political opponent, stated "the district of West Torrens will search for many years before it will find a more able representative than the late Mr. Hourigan". A public fund was taken up to purchase a house and provide for his wife and children.
