= William James Magarey =

Australian politician (1840–1920)

William James Magarey (1840 – 15 December 1920) was a flour miller and politician in the early days of the colony of South Australia.

== History ==
William was a son of Thomas Magarey's brother, James Magarey (c. 1818 – 11 August 1859). James Magarey ran Gannawarra Station on Gunbower Creek (a tributary of the River Murray), later owned a flour mill in Hindmarsh, South Australia, then moved to "Laurel Bank Villa", Geelong, Victoria and drowned following the wreck of SS Admella. William worked on his father's station and moved to Geelong with him.

He took over the flour mill at Hindmarsh and purchased one at Port Pirie. He held the House of Assembly seat of West Torrens from April 1878 to March 1881.

== Other activities ==
He was on the boards of the Savings Bank, National Mutual Life Association, and the South Australian Woollen Company. He was also chairman for some years of the Executor and Trustee Agency Company and British Broken Hill Proprietary.

He was an enthusiastic member of South Australia's Volunteer Force (a pre-Federation militia).

== Family ==
On 10 March 1864 he married Anna Eliza Bundey (c. 1846 – 10 August 1920), a sister of Sir Henry Bundey; they had a daughter Edith May (died before 1920), and a son William Ashley Magarey (1868–1929), South Australian lawyer, originator of the Magarey Medal.

Around 1908 he became afflicted with rheumatism, but refused to relinquish any of his duties until incapable of walking.

== See also ==
- John Dunn (miller)
- William Randell
- John Darling and Son
- John Hart (South Australian colonist)
- Henry Kent Hughes
- John Ridley (inventor)
