= Daniel Livingston =

Australian politician

Daniel Livingston (12 October 1840 – 30 September 1888) was a carpenter, storekeeper and, briefly, politician in colonial South Australia.

He was born in Paisley, Scotland, and was educated at the Parish school of Rullchatthiam, Argyllshire. He arrived in South Australia in September 1867, and worked as a carpenter in Milang, then opened a store at Belvidere, near Strathalbyn, later moved to Laura. He settled on Yorke Peninsula, where he purchased a business, and served as a councillor for the Yorketown Corporation. Around 1882 he moved to the South-East and set up in business in Millicent.

He was elected to the seat of Victoria in the South Australian House of Assembly and served from April 1887, but with the advance of his terminal illness was granted leave of absence on 14 August 1888 and died the following month.

He was universally liked, but considered unsuited to politics - too upright, conscientious and sensitive to criticism.

== Family ==
Daniel married Helen (c. 1842 – 29 June 1933). Both were buried in Millicent cemetery. Her sister married J. H. Findlay.

Daniel had a twin brother John Livingston (12 October 1840 – 20 March 1889), a butcher in Glasgow.
