= 1878 South Australian colonial election =

Colonial election of South Australia

- 29 March−30 April 1878

All seats in the South Australian House of Assembly
- Results by electoral district for the House of Assembly

Colonial elections were held in South Australia from 29 March to 30 April 1878. All 46 seats in the South Australian House of Assembly were up for election.

The three years after the 1875 election continued the instability of government. Arthur Blyth was replaced by James Boucaut only two months after the 1875 election. He re-shuffled his ministry in March 1876, but survived only 73 days before defeat by John Colton. Boucaut returned in 1877, and took the parliament into the 1878 election in April.

Since the inaugural 1857 election, no parties or solid groupings had been formed, which resulted in frequent changes of the Premier. If for any reason the incumbent Premier of South Australia lost sufficient support through a successful motion of no confidence at any time on the floor of the house, he would tender his resignation to the Governor of South Australia, which would result in another member deemed to have the support of the House of Assembly being sworn in by the Governor as the next Premier.

Informal groupings began and increased government stability occurred from the 1887 election. The United Labor Party would be formed in 1891, while the National Defence League would be formed later in the same year.

== See also ==
- Premier of South Australia
