= Benjamin Gould (politician) =

Australian politician

Benjamin Gould (9 October 1849 – 29 October 1922) was a politician in colonial South Australia.

== History ==
Gould was the eldest son of Ephraim Gould (c. 1825 – 10 October 1891), draper, of Bowden and his wife Susannah, née Barnes (c. 1827 – 14 November 1891). who emigrated to South Australia on the Constance, arriving at Port Adelaide in May 1848.

He was employed on the staff of J. W. Grasby & Co., Limited.

He was Mayor of Hindmarsh from December 1893 to July 1896 (E. Gould was mayor 1887–1888). He was elected to the South Australian House of Assembly for the seat of West Torrens and sat from April 1887 to April 1893, his colleagues being Benjamin Nash followed by Thomas Henry Brooker.

He was for a time organist for the Way Memorial Church, Bowden, and for about 17 years a member of the Pirie Street Methodist Church choir. He was leader of the Bowden Brass Band from 1885 to 1895. (Note: Deputy bandmaster 1888–1891 was one S. Gould, possibly Samuel Gould, whose relationship, if any, has not been found)

He died at his home, Chief street, Brompton after a long illness.

== Family ==
Gould married Amelia E. Williams (17 June 1851 – 10 December 1936) on 10 November 1870.

- Arthur William Gould (6 February 1872 – 1941) married Frances Ellen Grubb on 18 April 1894. He was employed by E. O. Thomas, Limited.
- Fanny Jane "Sis" Gould (7 August 1875 – 1952) never married
- Flora V. Gould (2 April 1882 – 18 July 1948) married (Alfred) John Cowling (c. 1880 – 29 August 1951) on 26 September 1906; they lived in Bowden.
