= Frederick Estcourt Bucknall =

Australian politician (1835–1896)

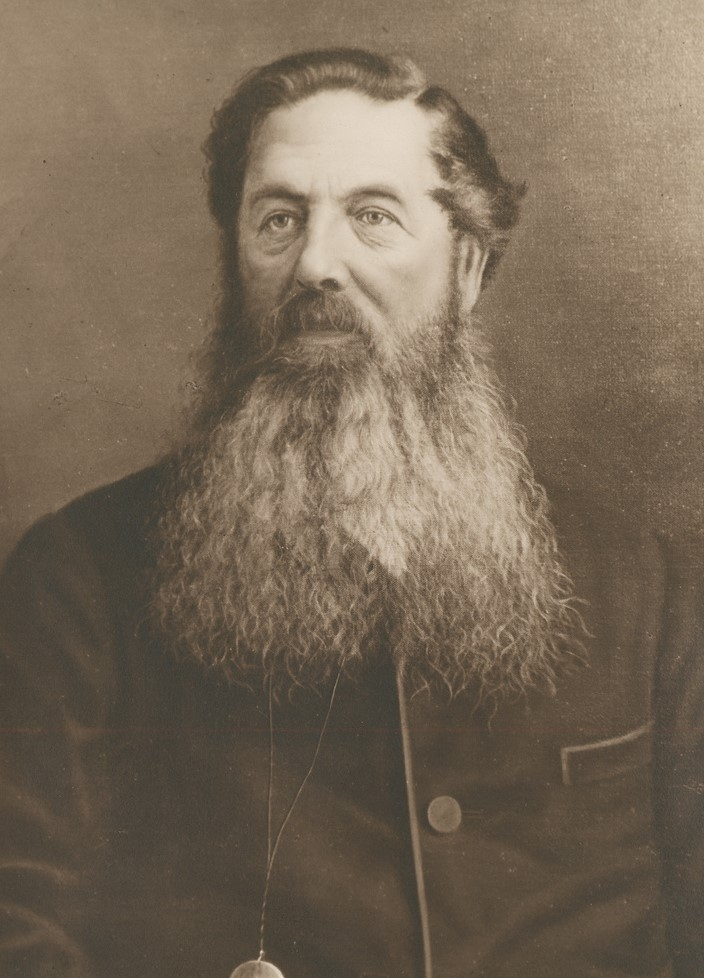
- Bucknall, c. 1880
- Born: 6 July 1835; London, England
- Died: 4 June 1896 (aged 60); North Adelaide, Australia
- Occupations: Publican, brewer, politician

Frederick Estcourt Bucknall (6 July 1835 – 4 June 1896) was an English-born Australian publican, brewer, and politician.

== Life ==
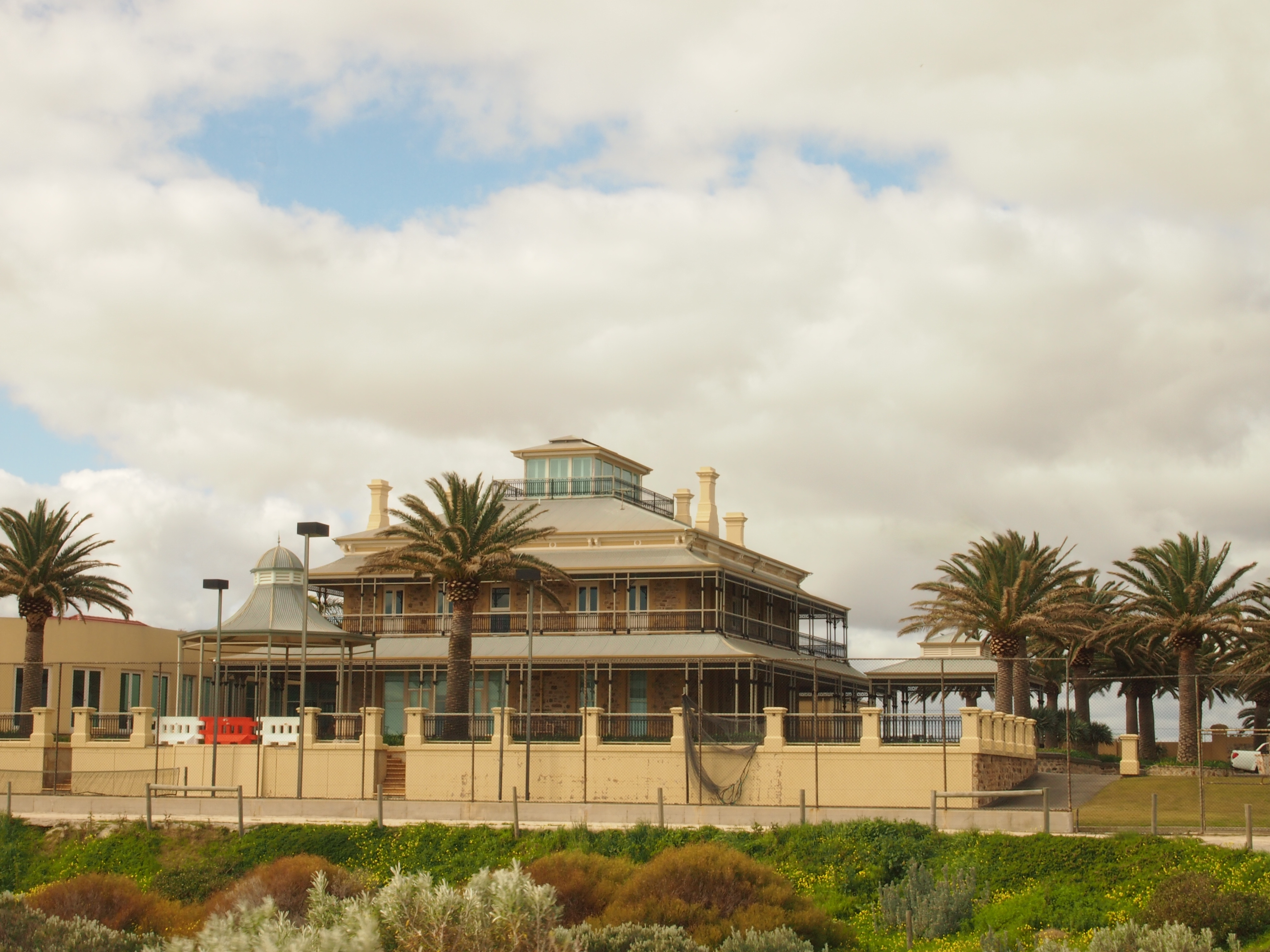
Estcourt House, Tennyson, built by Bucknall in 1881–3.

Bucknall was a member of the Estcourts of Estcourt, an influential old family, in the counties of Gloucester and Wiltshire, but born in London, where his father, William Bucknall of Crutched Friars, was Commodore of the Royal Thames Yacht Club.

Shortly after he arrived in South Australia around 1860 via Melbourne, the original Torrens Dam was nearly completed, and he built a fleet of fine pleasure craft which he placed on the lake for hire, but the dam failed and was washed away, putting paid to his enterprise. He built a boatshed on the Port River to the south-east of where the Jervois Street bridge was later built, and created a great deal of interest in sculling on the Port River. He gained approval as a Licensed Victualler and built the South Australian Club Hotel in St Vincent Street, Port Adelaide, near the site of his boatshed. He married the widow of Mr. Henry Haussen, a proprietor of the Hindmarsh Brewery.

In 1878, Bucknall and Arthur Harvey (later to be his parliamentary colleague) formed the Grange Land and Investment Company to develop the suburb of The Grange.

The business prospered, and he became a wealthy man. In 1883, he built a magnificent mansion, "Estcourt House," on the seafront between The Grange and Glanville. He and Mrs. Bucknall went on a visit to England. While they were away, the land boom turned to bust, and with the failure of the Commercial Bank of South Australia in 1886, he lost much of his fortune. He was forced to relinquish his mansion to the AMP Society and find employment in the E. Benda and Co. office on Grenfell Street.

Bucknall died at his residence in Childers Street, North Adelaide.

=== Politics ===
Bucknall entered Parliament as a member for West Torrens on 8 April 1881 as a colleague of W. H. Bean, and was elected for another three years in 1884 with Arthur Harvey (died 25 January 1902) with a break 1885–1886 while he visited England for his health.

Bucknall supported projects to build the Outer Harbor and the North–South Railway, but for some, he was remembered as having instituted mandatory horse troughs outside licensed premises.

=== Civic life ===
Bucknall was Mayor of Hindmarsh in 1881, 1882, and 1883, a position he filled with distinction.

== Other interests ==
In his youth, he was a boxer, athlete, and president of the Hindmarsh Cricket Club, of which he was patron for over ten years before his death.

He was an enthusiastic rower, swimmer, and yachtsman. He went into boatbuilding and owned the yachts Brilliant, Rosa, and Enchantress, which he bought from Sir Thomas Elder (and eventually sold to one Alex Cunningham).

He was secretary of the Licensed Victuallers' Association for some time and president for six years. In recognition of this service, he was made a life member.

He was an excellent musician and was, at one time, an organist of the South Australian Grand Lodge of Freemasons, of which he was a member.

== Family ==
On 1 October 1874, he married Rosa Haussen (née Catchlove) (7 December 1840 – 23 November 1899), the widow of brewer Henry Herman Haussen (1830–1870); her children by her first husband included:

- Emily Mary Haussen (4 May 1859 – 1914) married Harry Walker ( – 25 November 1886) on 20 April 1881
- Rosa Henrietta Haussen (2 November 1860 – 29 November 1915) married Arthur Wellington Ware (1867 – 29 January 1927) on 11 March 1884
- Ellen Florence Haussen (12 April 1862 – 9 February 1878)
- Ada Haussen (3 February 1864 – 29 December 1952) married William John Allsop Begg (c. 1866 – 29 September 1947)
- Henry Spencer "Spence" Haussen (3 September 1865 – 1942 Wyong, NSW)
- Amelia Haussen (26 January 1869 – ) married architect Arthur Dan Bendle Garlick (c. 1863 – 27 June 1901) on 8 April 1890
- Frederick George Haussen (21 April 1867 – 10 August 1875)
- Anna Hermanna Haussen (6 January 1871 – 14 March 1943) married solicitor George Andrew Greer ( – 1 May 1905) on 18 June 1890

Children by her marriage to Bucknall were three daughters and a son, born in Adelaide, South Australia

- Louisa Bucknall (29 October 1875 – 1957). She married Charles John Smith in 1899 in Perth, Western Australia, where she died.
- Flora For(r)est Bucknall (31 March 1877 – 1 November 1883).
- Frederick Bucknall, jun. (23 May 1878 – c. November 1903) lost in the sinking of the Loch Bredan.
- Isabelle Bucknall (c.1880 – 29 August 1946). Unmarried.

Rosa married one more time, to John Huxtable Wesley Perryman (c. 1837 – 1923) and moved to Mount Magnet, Western Australia.

By the terms of their father's will, the children of H. H. Haussen were very well provided for and were prominent in business and society, while those of F. E. Bucknall shared their parents' straitened circumstances and have lapsed into obscurity.

== Memorials ==
Estcourt House was purchased by the trustees of the legacy of Jessie Brown (ca.1826 – 13 November 1892), wealthy widow of pastoralist James Brown of Avenue Ranges station (near Naracoorte) and Waverley House, Glen Osmond, for the care of crippled children (most suffering or recovering from tuberculosis, poliomyelitis, or rheumatic fever) and the aged blind. The building was the prominent location for the 1990 movie Struck by Lightning.
