= Frederick Spicer =

Australian politician

Frederick Spicer (c. 1820 – 7 May 1905) was a medical doctor and politician in the colony of South Australia.

== Biography ==
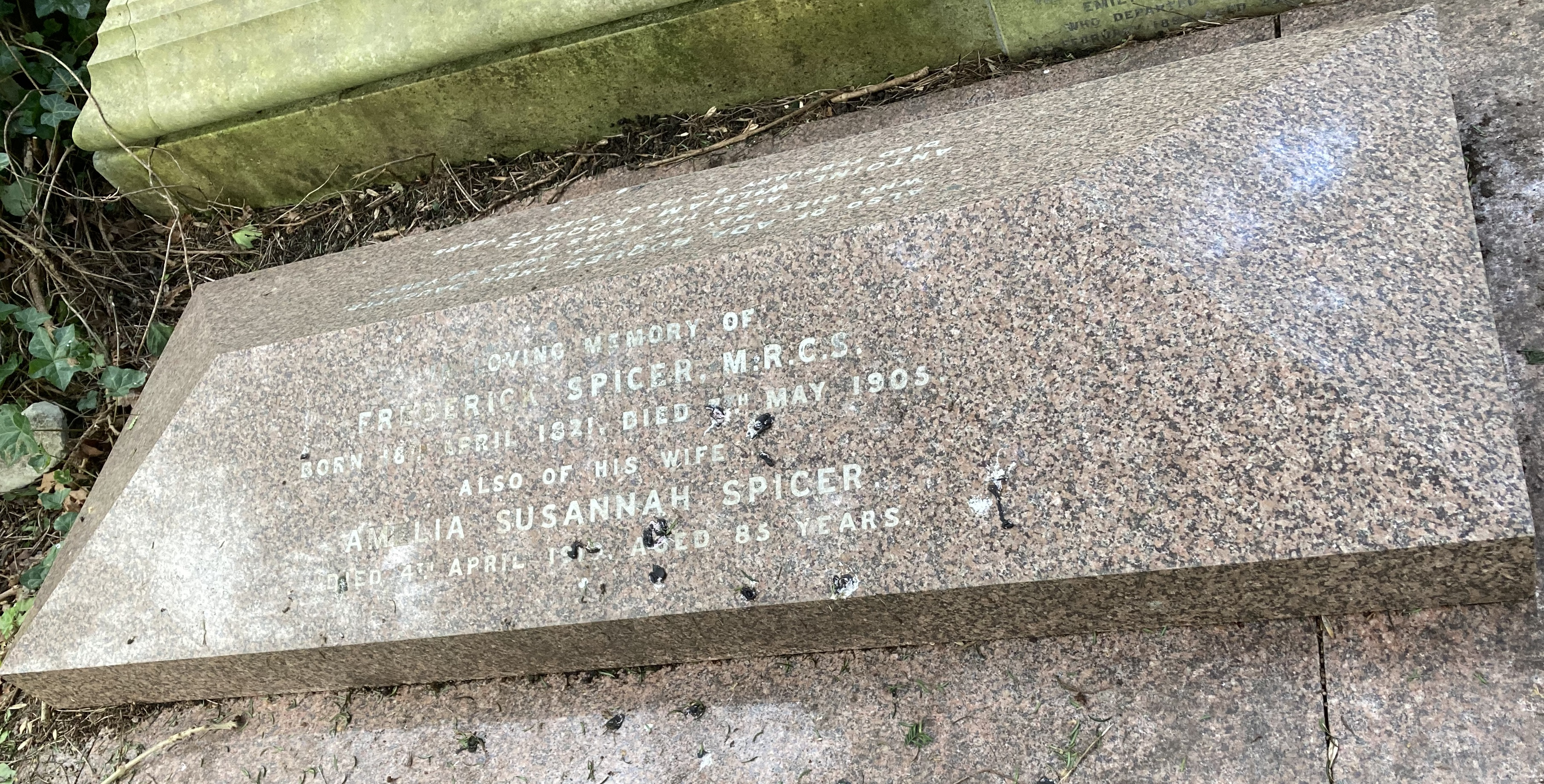
Family vault of Frederick Spicer in Highgate Cemetery

Spicer was one of five brothers, four having been trained as doctors, and emigrated to Victoria in the early 1850s. He practised in St. Kilda, Victoria for a while before moving to South Australia in 1862 to take a position of House Surgeon with the Adelaide Hospital. He took over the practice of Dr. Taylor at Kensington in 1864, and was followed by Dr. John Benson both as House Surgeon and, in 1866, at Kensington. Spicer next had a practice in Adelaide with Dr. Augustus Davies, formerly of Clare.

He was appointed in 1867 to a panel of enquiry into the operation of the Hospital, which, over the objections of the Colonial Surgeon, Robert Waters Moore MRCS (1820–1884), recommended sweeping reforms.

He returned to England around 1871, died at Tufnell Park and is buried in a family vault in Highgate Cemetery (west side).

== Politics ==
He was elected to the Adelaide City Council for Grey Ward in December 1869. His candidacy drew some criticism, as he was a major shareholder in the South Australian Gas Company and a proponent of gas lighting for the City.

He was elected a member for The Sturt in the South Australian House of Assembly in February 1870 following the resignation of Richard Bullock Andrews who had accepted the post of Crown Solicitor and Public Prosecutor. He sat until March 1870, with Joseph Fisher as his colleague. He was a candidate at the following election but was unsuccessful.

== Family ==
He was married; they had two sons, both doctors, and one daughter.

- R. H. S. Spicer was an ear, nose and throat specialist in Cavendish Square, London.
- a second son, born in Adelaide, was a medical doctor in the Royal Navy
- their only daughter, also born in Adelaide, married Mr. Roques, a leading London architect.

Edward Spicer (1 January 1817 – 7 May 1906), businessman of Rose Park, was a brother. He emigrated to South Australia on the Winchester, arriving in June 1838; fellow passengers included T. G. Waterhouse's brothers Henry and John. He married Elizabeth (c. 1819 – 24 January 1889). Their daughter Elizabeth Spicer (31 May 1846 – 1911) married (later Sir) Edwin T. Smith on 11 November 1869 (his second marriage).

(Two other brothers trained as doctors but first Henry (from 1853 to 1873), then George (from 1873 to 1896), found the life of a businessman in partnership with Edward more congenial.)
