= Beaumont Arnold Moulden =

Australian politician

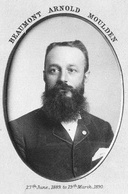
Beaumont Moulden

Beaumont Arnold Moulden (19 October 1849 – 20 December 1926) was a politician in colonial South Australia (a state of Australia from 1901), a member of the South Australian House of Assembly and Attorney-General of South Australia from 1889 to 1890.

Moulden was born in London, England, the son of Joseph Eldin Moulden (died 1891), a solicitor, and his wife Margaret Perkins Moulden, née Hinton, (died 1881).

Moulden arrived in South Australia with his parents in October 1850. He was educated at J. L. Young's Adelaide Educational Institution, qualified as a legal practitioner in Adelaide and joined his father's firm as Moulden & Son. He was elected to the seat of Albert in the South Australian House of Assembly on 6 April 1887, a position he held until 8 April 1890. Moulden was appointed Attorney-General in the John Cockburn Ministry on 27 June 1889, but retired on 19 March 1890, prior to the defeat of the Ministry, owing to his disapproval of some items of their policy.

He was a longtime friend of land developer W. H. Gray, and acted as his lawyer, associate in many ventures, and co-executor of his Will.

Moulden was elected to the South Australian Legislative Council on 19 December 1903 for Central District No. 1, a position he held until 16 January 1912. He was a member of the National Defence League/Liberal Union.

Moulden died at Adelaide, South Australia, on 20 December 1926.

== Family ==
Beaumont Arnold Moulden married Anna Mary Cramond on 25 September 1872; they had four children:

- John Eldin Collett Moulden (1873– ) married Kate Gertrude Lavington Glyde ( – ) in 1898
- Sir Frank Beaumont Moulden (1876-1932) married Deborah Vernon Hackett in 1918. He was a solicitor and mayor of Adelaide
- Margaret Minna Moulden (1879– ) married John Wheeley Lea (1867 – 26 April 1947) in 1902. Lea was a son of Dr. Edward Lea of Robe, and a distant relative of the Worcestershire sauce manufacturer John Wheeley Lea. They divorced in 1924.
- Eldin Swanzy Moulden (1883–1919) married Edna Annie Marshall ( – ) in 1906
