= Arthur Harvey (Australian politician) =

Australian politician

- Born: 1827; United Kingdom
- Died: 25 January 1902 (aged 74–75); Wellington, New Zealand
- Occupation: Politician

Arthur Harvey (c. 1827 – 25 January 1902) was a politician in the colony of South Australia.

== Background ==
Arthur Harvey was sent to South Australia around 1870 by a consortium of London businessmen who planned to capitalize on the expected increase in the value of land along the route of the proposed railway to Port Darwin. The railway was shelved, but Harvey remained as a speculator and investor. Harvey was secretary of the Euko Mining Company 1867, The Wharf and Land Company, Port Adelaide South Limited in 1878,

In 1878 Harvey and Frederick Estcourt Bucknall (later to be his parliamentary colleague) formed the Grange Land and Investment Company, to develop the suburb of The Grange. In 1881 he and John Brodie Spence formed the East Adelaide Investment Co. Ltd. which laid out the suburb of East Adelaide.

Harvey was a member for West Torrens in the South Australian House of Assembly from April 1884 to April 1887, with F. E. Bucknall as his colleague, and was a supporter of the Colton ministry. Shortly afterwards he suffered financially with the collapse of the land boom.

Harvey was involved in attempts to exploit under-developed copper mines in the Moonta district.

Harvey died at Wellington, New Zealand while visiting his daughter, Mrs. Rhind.

== Family ==
Harvey married ?? (c. 1830 – 7 August 1888); they lived in East Adelaide. Their children included:

- John Harvey (c. 1863 – April 1904) married Isabella Coates (10 August 1858 – 25 February 1934) on 29 January 1878; he was a stock and share broker in Adelaide and Melbourne, died on an outback track in Georgetown, Queensland. Isabella married again, to (David) Erskine Latham Randall on 2 November 1905.
- Arthur Vernon Harvey (1864 – 30 August 1901) married Florence Jane Elizabeth "Bessie" Way (1867 – 14 July 1949), daughter of Dr. Edward Willis Way, on 7 October 1896. He was killed at Devondale, South Africa in the South African War. She married again, to Captain C(harles) Stanley Tratman ( – 9 February 1946) of the 22nd Battalion, 8th Brigade, 1st AIF, on 19 October 1915.
- Louisa Harvey (2 May 1872 – 1937) married William Graham Rhind (1866–1???) on 29 March 1883. He was manager of the Adelaide branch of the Bank of New South Wales, in 1882 moved to Christchurch, New Zealand.
