= George Bean (politician) =

South Australian entrepreneur and parliamentarian

George Thomas Bean

Member of Parliament for South Australia
- In office 21 April 1868 – 29 January 1870

Personal details
- Born: c. 1845
- Died: 25 February 1912
- Relations: William Henry Bean (Brother) Arthur Bean (Brother)
- Occupation: Entrepreneur and parliamentarian

George Thomas Bean (c. 1845 – 25 February 1912) (generally known as "G. T. Bean") was a prominent South Australian entrepreneur and parliamentarian. His business ventures included leather, shipping, and mining in South and Western Australia, and sugar in the Northern Territory of Australia, often in conjunction with one or both of his brothers William and Arthur Bean.

== Life ==
He was educated at J. L. Young's Adelaide Educational Institution,

He was elected, with Henry Strangways, to the Fifth Parliament (1868–1870) for the District of West Torrens of the South Australian House of Assembly, on 21 April 1868, the first SA-colony-born person to achieve this. On 19 November 1869 with J. A. Bean he left for London on business, but his application for leave of absence was refused by Parliament, despite a petition from his constituents. His seat was declared vacant on 29 January 1870, due to his "failure to attend".

While away he prospected for diamonds in Cape Town, with some success, not returning until 1878. John Pickering won the resulting by-election on 10 February 1870, and the Fifth Parliament was dissolved on 2 March 1870. His brother William H. Bean successfully stood for West Torrens at the election for the Sixth Parliament.

During his term as an M.P. in 1869 G. T. Bean was brought into mining matters.

He was a popular speaker and frequently called upon to officiate at public occasions in the Hindmarsh area.

He was one of the original shareholders in the Port Augusta and Port Darwin Railway Co. Ltd.

George Bean with Alfred von Doussa proposed diamond mining at Echunga in 1879 but no evidence of any exploration.

G. T. Bean was Chairman of West Australian Mining Company in 1895.

He was a Fellow of the Royal Geographical Society and of the Institute of Directors in London. Following a number of operations for cancer, he died in London on 25 February 1912, aged 67. He was survived by his brothers, William living in England, and Arthur in Sydney.

South Australian House of Assembly
Preceded by John Pickering	Member for West Torrens; 1868–1870; With: Henry Strangways	Succeeded by John Pickering
