= John Ridley (inventor) =

Australian inventor

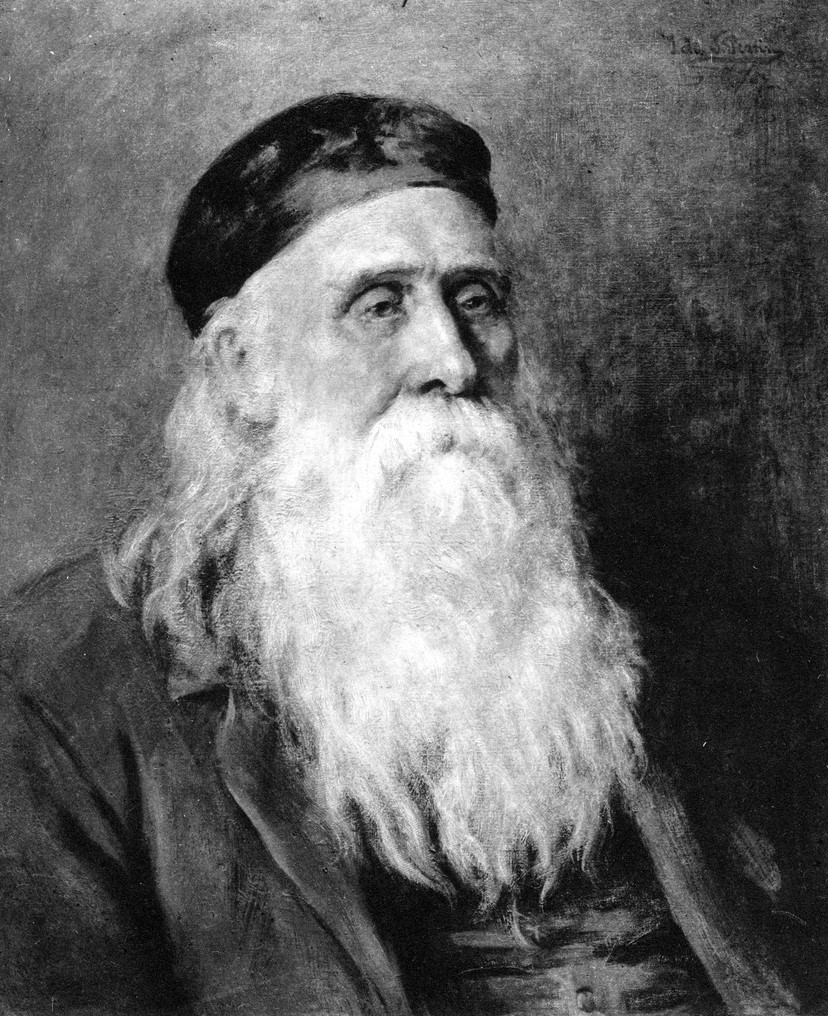
- Born: 26 May 1806 near West Boldon, County Durham, England
- Died: 25 November 1887 (aged 81); London, England
- Occupations: miller, inventor, landowner, investor, farming machinery manufacturer, farmer and preacher
- Known for: Ridley harvesting machine
- Spouse: Mary White Pybus (1807–1884)
- Children: born England: Mary Elizabeth Ridley (1836–1840), Anne Eleanor Ridley (1839–1923); born Hindmarsh, South Australia: Mary Elizabeth Ridley (1843–), Jane Taylor Ridley (1845–1929)

John Ridley (26 May 1806 – 25 November 1887) was an English miller, inventor, landowner, investor, farming machinery manufacturer, farmer and preacher who lived in Australia between 1839 and 1853. He is best known for the development, manufacture and invention of "Ridley's Stripper", a machine that removed the heads of grain, with the threshing being done later by a separate machine. The suburb of Ridleyton in the city of Adelaide, Australia was named for him.

== Early life ==
Ridley was born near West Boldon, County Durham, England. He was the son of a miller also named John Ridley, who died when his son was five years old. His mother, Mary (a cousin of John Sr.), carried on the business; when Ridley was 15 years of age he began assisting her in managing the business. Ridley had little formal education, but had a love of books and a remarkable memory. He began preaching at 18, and at 23 was a recognised local preacher in the Sunderland circuit.

After his mother's death in 1835, Ridley married Mary Pybus, and in November 1839 sailed for South Australia aboard the Warrior with his wife and two infant children, arriving in Adelaide on 17 April 1840.

== Career in Australia ==
On arrival in South Australia he bought a piece of land near Adelaide at Hindmarsh, took over the flour-mill of the South Australian Company, installed the colony's first steam engine (a Watt's Beam) with the ability to cut wood and grind meal, and began growing wheat at Hindmarsh. Foreseeing that the heavy spending by governor George Gawler would lead to depression and increased rural production, Ridley let his farm and devoted his time to seeking grain for his mill, purchasing land, and investing in the developing copper-mine at Burra.

By 1843 the colony's expanding wheat crop threatened to exceed the capacity of the work force available to harvest it. Ridley attempted to design a machine to assist in the harvest based on a design in John Claudius Loudon's An Encyclopaedia of Agriculture (3rd ed., London, 1835). The colony's corn exchange committee offered £40 for a design for a reaper. Ridley did not compete because his machine was nearing completion in the factory of John Stokes Bagshaw. In October Ridley's machine was ready for its first tests, and a month later a rebuilt machine was successfully tested on his tenant's crop, reaping 70 acres (28 ha) in a week. On 18 November 1843 the Adelaide Observer wrote that "a further trial of Mr Ridley's machine has established its success". Over the next year he planned the improvement and manufacture of the machine, in 1845 he made seven machines, and by 1850 over 50 machines were operating in the colony and others had been exported. The Ridley stripper received a Historic Engineering Marker from Engineers Australia as part of its Engineering Heritage Recognition Program.

== Return to England ==
Although Ridley's returns from the harvesting machine were substantial, they were meagre compared with the dividends from his original shares in the Burra copper-mine, his flour-mill and his land investments. He was in comfortable circumstances, and in 1853 he and his family left Australia for a lengthy journey through Europe. After several years they eventually settled in England where he devoted "his eccentric enthusiasm to invention and religion". At his own cost he had printed tens of thousands of copies of sermons and tracts that appealed to his principles and distributed them widely to grateful and ungrateful recipients. He was also an energetic lay preacher and made many gifts to evangelical churches and missions.

== Legacy ==
Ridley died on 25 November 1887 in London. He had Annie Eleanor (1839-1923) and Jane Taylor (1845-1929). A silver candelabrum, gifted to him in 1861, a portrait of him painted by Ida Perrin and two books of Australian autographs were bequeathed, on Jane's death in 1929, to the University of Adelaide. The candelabrum is now at the Waite Agricultural Research Institute.

H. J. Finnis wrote about Ridley:

His altruism and passion for practical improvement were sincere, and meant more to him than his own financial success. His self-reliance made him eschew government rewards in South Australia, where his memory is honoured by the Ridley memorial scholarship at Roseworthy Agricultural College, memorial gates to the Royal Agricultural and Horticultural Society's showground at Wayville and the electoral district of Ridley.

Percival Serle wrote:

The machine, which both reaped and threshed corn, has been of inestimable benefit to Australia. Though no doubt it was improved in detail as the years went by, no substantial advance was made on it until Hugh Victor McKay constructed his harvester some 40 years later. Ridley not only declined to patent his machine, but refused all suggestions of reward.

He was commemorated in 1933 by the erection of the Ridley Gates at the Adelaide Showgrounds, Wayville.

The Adelaide suburb of Ridleyton and Ridley Grove, a thoroughfare in the suburbs of Ferryden Park and Woodville Gardens, were named for him.

== Controversy regarding the inventor of the Stripper ==
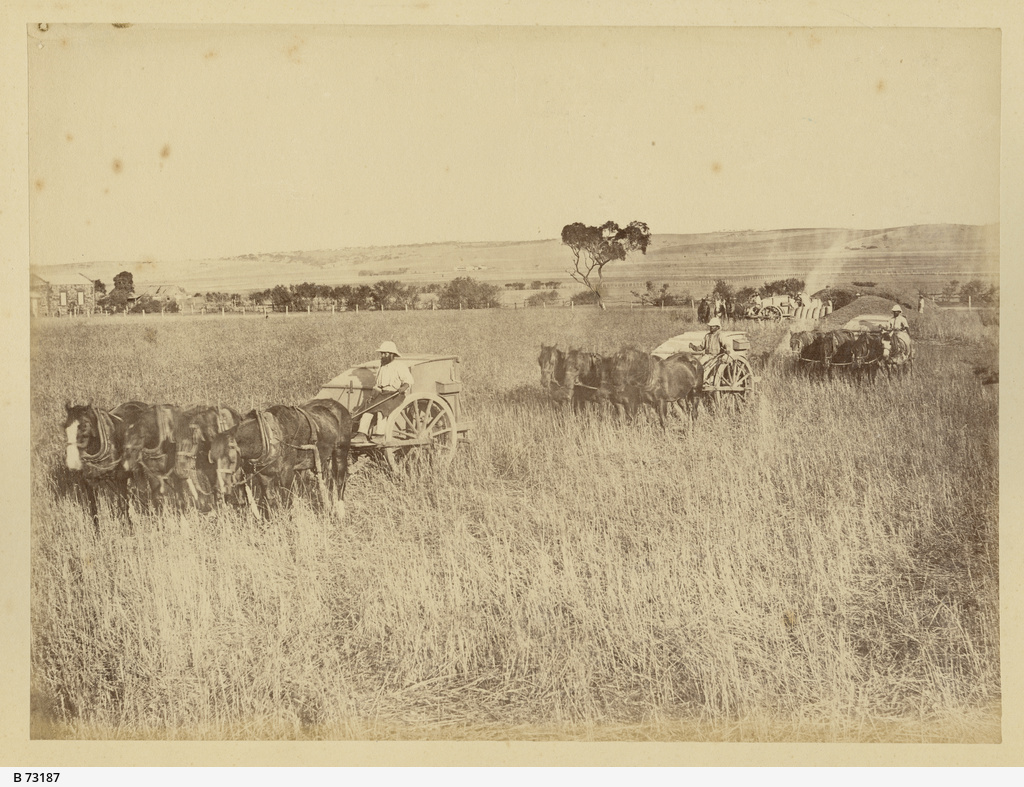
Ridley's reapers at work, 1890s.

For more than 140 years an argument has continued, off and on (and sometimes acrimoniously) over the invention of the South Australian wheat "stripper". Some, such as G. L. Sutton (1937), have claimed that the real inventor was a farmer, John Wrathall Bull (1804–1886), and that Bull's idea was stolen and then commercially exploited by the Hindmarsh flour-miller John Ridley (1806–1887). Indeed, following Sutton, most modern Australian agricultural and general historians have accepted this view without question, and incorporated it into their own works. Ridley and his supporters, however, always staunchly denied the charge (which was originally laid by J. W. Bull in 1845), insisting that Ridley himself was the sole and unaided inventor.

Although it was claimed that the machine was invented in principle by John Wrathall Bull, none disputed that Ridley was its first practical producer. In 1844 he was awarded a special prize by the Agricultural and Horticultural Society and in 1858 he was thanked by the South Australian parliament for a service that had helped to make possible the vast increase of wheat-growing in the province.

The rival claims of Bull and Ridley to the title of inventor of the stripper were the subject of long controversy. In 1843 Ridley had the limelight. The controversy was revived in 1875. Supported by influential friends and by mechanics who had made the original harvesting machine, Bull petitioned parliament in 1880 for a grant in recognition of his invention. After long inquiry he was given £250 in 1882 "for services in improving agricultural machinery".

Bull devised an idea for a machine based on the comb and beater principle which reaped and threshed on his Mount Barker farm in 1842. He had the assistance of his good friend, brother-in-law and respected colonist Thomas Hudson Beare to create a working model for exhibition at the Corn Exchange committee meeting in 1843. "Having no wish for any personal gain, he donated his design for the good of the colony". "Much to Bull's surprise, John Ridley, (who exhibited no machine, or any proposals for one, at the Corn Exchange committee meeting), later emerged with a machine which was based on similar principles to those designed by Bull". Many other colonists backed Bull in testimonials and letters which appear in his book and also papers of the day.

Both Bagshaw and John Dunn, who were involved in the manufacture and testing of Ridley's prototype, supported his claim.

More recent work by L. J. Jones presented at the Second National Conference on Engineering Heritage in 1985 states:

It will be shown that certain purely engineering considerations can significantly assist in settling this matter; these have not been taken into account previously. Further, these engineering factors, taken together with some additional historical evidence recently brought forward, now enable us to see that Ridley was unjustly accused, and that in fact he is fully entitled to the credit for the "stripper's" invention as well as for its introduction.
