= 1870 South Australian colonial election =

- 28 March−21 April 1870

All seats in the South Australian House of Assembly
- Results by electoral district for the House of Assembly

Colonial elections were held in South Australia from 28 March to 21 April 1870. All 36 seats in the South Australian House of Assembly were up for election.

This election was called early, after continuing instability in the governments. The Henry Ayers government which emerged after the 1868 election was defeated only three months later. His replacement, John Hart, survived 19 days before defeat by Henry Ayers, whose period in office lasted only 21 days until defeat by Henry Strangways, who took the parliament into the early election.

Since the inaugural 1857 election, no parties or solid groupings had been formed, which resulted in frequent changes of the Premier. If for any reason the incumbent Premier of South Australia lost sufficient support through a successful motion of no confidence at any time on the floor of the house, he would tender his resignation to the Governor of South Australia, which would result in another member deemed to have the support of the House of Assembly being sworn in by the Governor as the next Premier.

Informal groupings began and increased government stability occurred from the 1887 election. The United Labor Party would be formed in 1891, while the National Defence League would be formed later in the same year.

== See also ==
- Premier of South Australia
