= Electoral district of West Torrens =

South Australian state electoral district

West Torrens South Australia—House of Assembly
- Interactive map of electoral district boundaries from the 2022 state election (Note: The electorate will have no change in boundaries at the 2026 state election.)
- State: South Australia
- Dates current: 1857–1902, 1915–1938, 1956–1970, 2002–present
- MP: Tom Koutsantonis
- Party: Labor
- Namesake: City of West Torrens
- Electors: 25,777 (2018)
- Area: 18.3 km^{2} (7.1 sq mi)
- Demographic: Metropolitan
- Coordinates: 34°56′9″S 138°32′55″E
Electorates around West Torrens:
Cheltenham	Croydon	Adelaide
Colton	West Torrens	Adelaide
Morphett	Badcoe	Unley

West Torrens is a single-member electoral district for the South Australian House of Assembly. Named after the City of West Torrens (which is so-named because of its location on the River Torrens), it is a 25.1 km² suburban electorate in Adelaide's west. It includes the suburbs and areas of Brooklyn Park, Cowandilla, Flinders Park, Hilton, Hindmarsh, Keswick Terminal, Marleston, Mile End, Mile End South, Netley, Richmond, Southwark, Thebarton, Torrensville, Underdale and West Richmond, as well as parts of Allenby Gardens, Lockleys, Welland and West Hindmarsh.

West Torrens has had several incarnations, first as a Legislative Council district, then four times as a South Australian House of Assembly electoral district.

- It was first used as district in the Legislative Council, from 1851 until 1857, with Charles Simeon Hare and then Thomas Reynolds being the members.
- From 1857 it became a House of Assembly district, returning two members until it was abolished as a name at the 1902 election.
- At the 1915 election, it was recreated as a House of Assembly seat returning two members, being abolished again at the 1938 election when single-member districts were introduced.
- In 1955 it was recreated to replace the abolished seat of Thebarton for the 1956 election, the first time that the district was represented by a single member. It was abolished at the 1970 election and replaced with the electoral district of Peake.
- It reverted to its original name for the 2002 election, after a redistribution.

== Members ==
First incarnation (1857–1902) (Two-member electorate)
Member	Party	Term	Member	Party	Term
Luther Scammell		1857–1860	James Cole		1857–1860
Thomas Magarey		1860–1862	George Morphett		1860–1861
Thomas Magarey		1860–1862	Randolph Stow		1861–1862
Henry Strangways		1862–1871	Augustine Stow		1862–1865
Henry Strangways		1862–1871	John Pickering		1865–1868
Henry Strangways		1862–1871	G. T. Bean		1868–1870
Henry Strangways		1862–1871	John Pickering		1870–1870
Henry Strangways		1862–1871	W. H. Bean		1870–1871
James Boucaut		1871–1875	John Pickering		1871–1878
Benjamin Taylor		1875–1876	John Pickering		1871–1878
J. M. Sinclair		1876–1878	John Pickering		1871–1878
W. J. Magarey		1878–1881	W. H. Bean		1878–1884
F. E. Bucknall		1881–1887	W. H. Bean		1878–1884
F. E. Bucknall		1881–1887	Arthur Harvey		1884–1887
Benjamin Gould		1887–1893	Benjamin Nash		1887–1890
Benjamin Gould		1887–1893	T. H. Brooker		1890–1902
Frank Hourigan	Labor	1893–1901	T. H. Brooker		1890–1902

Second incarnation (1915–1938) (Two-member electorate)
Member	Party	Term	Member	Party	Term
Henry Chesson	Labor	1915–1917	Thompson Green	Labor	1915–1917
Henry Chesson	National	1917–1918	Thompson Green	National	1917–1918
Alfred Blackwell	Labor	1918–1931	John McInnes	Labor	1918–1931
Alfred Blackwell	Parliamentary Labor	1931–1934	John McInnes	Parliamentary Labor	1931–1934
Alfred Blackwell	Labor	1934–1938	John McInnes	Labor	1934–1938

Third incarnation (1956–1970) (Single-member electorate)
Member	Party	Term
Fred Walsh	Labor	1956–1965
Glen Broomhill	Labor	1965–1970

Fourth incarnation (2002–present) (Single-member electorate)
Member	Party	Term
Tom Koutsantonis	Labor	2002–present

== Election results ==
2026 South Australian state election: West Torrens
Party	Candidate	Votes	%	±%
Labor	Tom Koutsantonis	11,802	52.6	−2.3
One Nation	Judith Aldridge	4,045	18.0	+18.0
Greens	Sam Bannon	3,854	17.2	±0.0
Liberal	Sarika Sharma	2,174	9.7	−18.2
Family First	Anna Wamayi	390	1.7	+1.7
Australian Family	Mathew Wilson	179	0.8	+0.8
Total formal votes		22,444	97.4	+0.4
Informal votes		599	2.6	−0.4
Turnout		23,043	88.6	−0.6
Two-party-preferred result
Labor	Tom Koutsantonis	16,439	73.2	+4.4
One Nation	Judith Aldridge	6,005	26.8	+26.8
Labor hold				
