= William Ashley Magarey =

Australian lawyer, sportsman and sports administrator

William Magarey
- Born: 30 January 1868; Wellington Square, North Adelaide
- Died: 18 October 1929 (aged 61); North Adelaide, South Australia
- Occupations: Sports administrator, Lawyer
- Known for: The Magarey Medal; First SAFA chairman First-class cricketer

William Ashley Magarey (30 January 1868 – 18 October 1929) was a lawyer, sportsman and sports administrator. He was the first chairman of the South Australian Football Association (SAFA) (later named South Australian National Football League (SANFL)), and a South Australian first-class cricketer, but he is best known for coming up with the idea of the Magarey Medal.

Magarey was born in North Adelaide, and educated at St Peter's College and the University of Adelaide, from which he graduated in 1884 to become a practising lawyer. From about 1890 he was a partner with George Murray in the law firm Murray & Magarey, a firm which continues today, after several mergers and name changes, as Finlaysons Lawyers. He became interested in football administration, and in 1897 was appointed the South Australian Football Association's inaugural chairman. Magarey, nicknamed 'Beautiful Bill', attempted to wipe out much of the rough play from the league by instituting an award which would be given to the fairest and most brilliant player each season. From the first Magarey Medal in 1898, he personally presented the award to the winners, until his death in 1929.

Despite his contribution to Australian rules football, Magarey excelled most at cricket during his younger years. He appeared in a first-class cricket match for South Australia vs New South Wales at the Adelaide Oval in December 1890, and he was bowled by Australian Test player Percie Charlton for a duck in his debut innings. He was demoted to number ten in the batting order for the second innings, where he was dismissed by another Test cricketer, Sydney Callaway, for seven. New South Wales went on to win the match by six wickets.

== Personal ==
On 5 March 1910 William Magarey married Gulielma Hack (17 October 1867 – 2 August 1951). They had no children. Gulielma, best known as Guli Hack, was a noted soprano, pianist and singing teacher associated with the Elder Conservatorium, and granddaughter of John Barton Hack. In 1901, William Magarey was enrolled in singing classes at the Elder Conservatorium; Guli Hack was his teacher.
