= Benjamin Nash =

Australian politician

Benjamin Nash (5 March 1829 – 19 April 1890) was a tailor and politician in colonial South Australia.

He was born in Birmingham and emigrated to Melbourne in 1857 but in July, after only a few months in the gold diggings, moved to Rundle Street, Adelaide and set up a tailoring business.

He was prominent in the Voluntary Militia, and from 1858 to 1865 served with the West Adelaide Company under Colonel George Mayo. In 1859 he successfully tendered for the supply of the first uniforms for the Volunteer Military Force. In 1878 he was elected to the Walkerville District Council, and became its chairman.

He was elected to the seat of West Torrens and sat from April 1887 to April 1890. He failed in his bid to be reelected, and died of kidney failure ten days later. He was buried in West Terrace Cemetery's Catholic section. He had converted to that faith around two years before his death. He made a gift of an organ to St. Laurence's, his small local church.

== Family ==
He married Ann Ide; they lived at Sturt Street, Adelaide and had eight children:

- Joseph George Nash ( 1853 – 1909 ), an engineer, patented a novel sheep shearing handpiece. He has been credited with invention of the Totalizator.
- Charlotte Ann Nash (c. 1854 – 10 July 1911) married Thomas Carter (c. 1853 - 2 February 1923), on 20 February 1928; they lived at Roseworthy, then Palmerston Road, Unley. She died after being struck by a motor car while crossing Unley Road.
- Sarah Jane Nash(1860 – 1863)
- John Francis Nash (1862 – 1904) a tobacconist; married Rose Ann Mackell (1865 - ) on 3 June 1891, Sydney NSW
- Eliza Nash (1863 – 1863), twin
- Hannah Nash (1863 – 1863), twin
- Alice Mary Nash (c. 1864 – 13 January 1899)
- youngest daughter Agnes Jane Eily "Jenny" Nash (1867 – 1932) married John Joseph Leahy (1851 – 1910) a contractor, on 8 September 1888
