= 10th Parliament of South Australia =

1881–1884 meeting of the South Australian Parliament

Tenth Parliament of South Australia
←	9th	11th	→
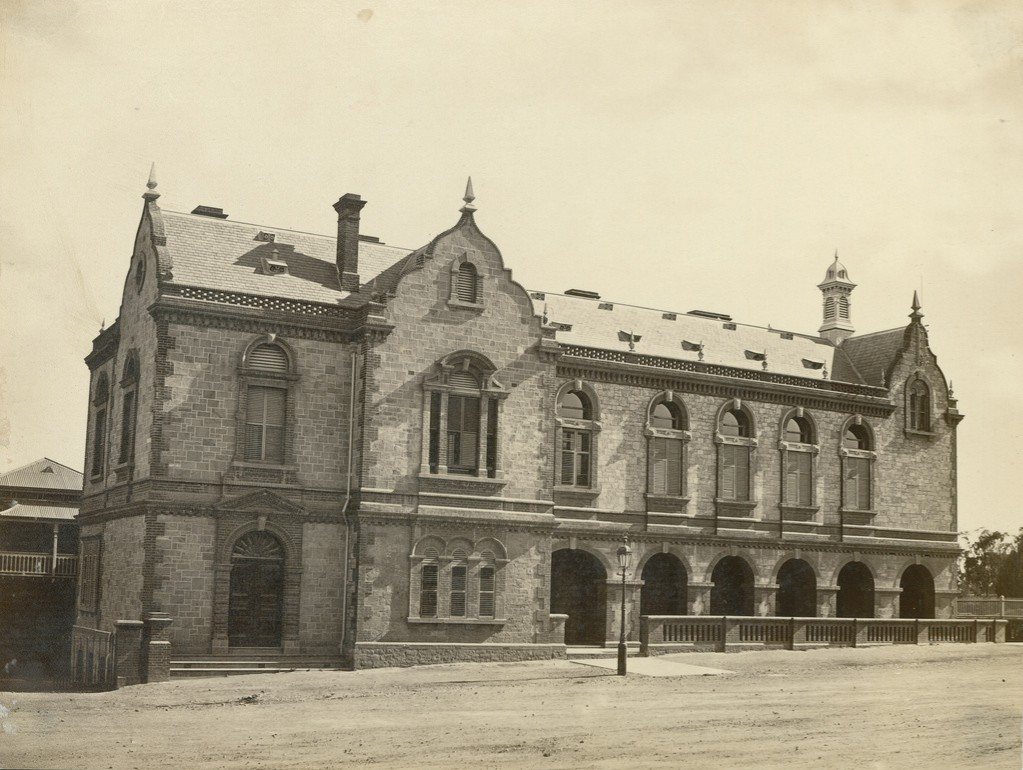
- Old Parliament House (1872)

Overview
- Legislative body: Parliament of South Australia
- Meeting place: Old Parliament House
- Term: 2 June 1881 – 19 March 1884
- Election: 8–27 April 1881

Legislative Council
- Members: 18 (until 29 May 1882); 24 (from 29 May 1882)
- President: Henry Ayers

House of Assembly
- Members: 46
- Speaker: Robert Dalrymple Ross

Sessions
- 1st: 2 June 1881 – 18 November 1881
- 2nd: 1 June 1882 – 17 November 1882
- 3rd: 31 May 1883 – 28 February 1884

The 10th Parliament of South Australia was a meeting of the legislative branch of the South Australian state government, composed of the South Australian Legislative Council and the South Australian House of Assembly.

== Leadership ==
Legislative Council

- President of the Legislative Council: Henry Ayers
- Clerk of the Legislative Council: Francis Corbet Singleton
- Clerk's assistant and Sergeant-at-arms: Frederick Halcomb

House of Assembly

- Speaker of the House of Assembly: Robert Dalrymple Ross
- Chairman of Committees: William Townsend (until 31 October 1882), Luke Lidiard Furner (from 31 October 1882)
- Clerk of the House of Assembly: George William de la Poer Beresford
- Clerk's assistant and Sargeant-at-arms: Edwin Gordon Blackmore

== Membership ==
=== Legislative Council ===
==== Until 29 May 1882 ====
6 of the 18 seats in the upper house were contested in the election on 20 April 1881. Members elected in 1881 are marked with an asterisk (*).

▌ Henry Ayers*
▌ Richard Chaffey Baker
▌ William Christie Buik*
▌ Allan Campbell
▌ John Crozier
▌ John Dunn, jun.
▌ Thomas Hogarth
▌ John Hodgkiss
▌ William Morgan

▌ Alexander Borthwick Murray
▌ James Pearce
▌ John Pickering*
▌ James Garden Ramsay
▌ James Rankine*
▌ William Sandover
▌ Henry Scott
▌ John Brodie Spence*
▌ Robert Alfred Tarlton*

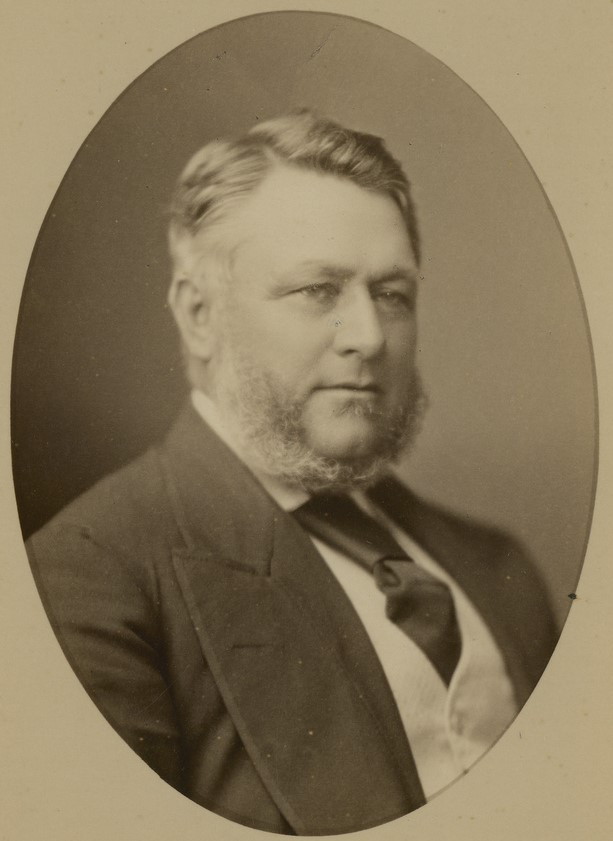
Legislative Council President
Henry Ayres

==== From 29 May 1882 ====
A special election was held on 29 May 1882 as the Legislative Council expanded to 24 members. Members elected in 1882 are marked with an asterisk (*).

▌ Henry Ayers
▌ Richard Chaffey Baker
▌ William Christie Buik
▌ Allan Campbell
▌ George Witheredge Cotton*
▌ John Crozier
▌ John Dunn, jun.
▌ Thomas English*

▌ William Dening Glyde*
▌ Alexander Hay*
▌ Thomas Hogarth
▌ John Hodgkiss
▌ Alexander Borthwick Murray
▌ David Murray*
▌ James Pearce
▌ John Pickering

▌ James Garden Ramsay
▌ James Rankine
▌ Maurice Salom*
▌ William Sandover
▌ Henry Scott
▌ William Knox Simms (Central)
▌ John Brodie Spence
▌ Robert Alfred Tarlton

=== House of Assembly ===
Albert

▌ Arthur Hardy
▌ Rudolph Henning

Barossa

▌ Martin Peter Friedrich Basedow
▌ John Downer

Burra

▌ Ben Rounsevell
▌ Ebenezer Ward

East Adelaide

▌ John Cox Bray
▌ Thomas Johnson

East Torrens

▌ Thomas Playford
▌ Edwin Thomas Smith

Encounter Bay

▌ Henry Edward Downer
▌ Simpson Newland

Flinders

▌ Patrick Boyce Coglin
▌ William Ranson Mortlock
▌ Andrew Tennant

Gumeracha

▌ William Haines
▌ Samuel Tomkinson

Light

▌ Jenkin Coles
▌ Robert Dixson
▌ Henry Vivian Moyle

Mount Barker

▌ Albert Henry Landseer
▌ John Lancelot Stirling

Noarlunga

▌ Thomas Atkinson
▌ John Colton

North Adelaide

▌ John Langdon Parsons

Onkaparinga

▌ John Carr
▌ Rowland Rees

Port Adelaide

▌ David Bower
▌ William Mattinson

Stanley

▌ Alfred Catt
▌ James Henderson Howe

Sturt

▌ Thomas King
▌ Josiah Symon

Victoria

▌ Lavington Glyde
▌ William Whinham

Wallaroo

▌ William Henry Beaglehole
▌ Luke Furner
▌ Robert Dalrymple Ross

West Adelaide

▌ Hugh Fraser
▌ Charles Cameron Kingston

West Torrens

▌ William Henry Bean
▌ Frederick Estcourt Bucknall

Wooroora

▌ John Bosworth
▌ Henry Edward Bright

Yatala

▌ Josiah Howell Bagster
▌ William Gilbert

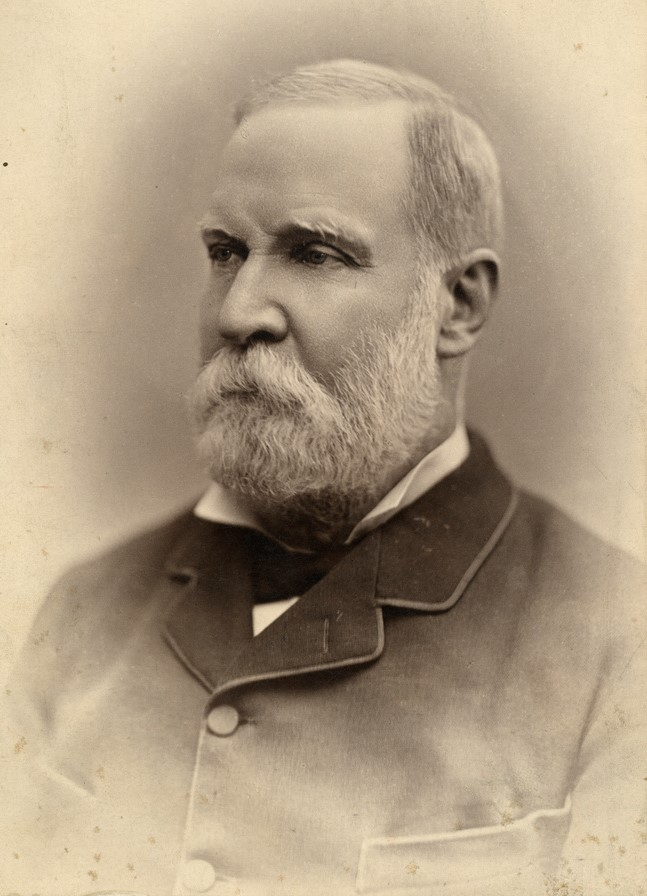
House of Assembly Speaker
Robert Dalrymple Ross

== Changes of membership ==
=== Legislative Council ===
Seat	Before	Change		After	
Seat	Member	Type	Date	Date	Member
Central	William Morgan	Died	30 January 1884	28 February 1884	William Knox Simms

=== House of Assembly ===
Seat	Before	Change		After	
Seat	Member	Type	Date	Date	Member
East Adelaide	George Swan Fowler	Resigned	7 June 1881	17 June 1881	Thomas Johnson
Yatala	David Murray	Unseated	28 June 1881	13 July 1881	David Murray
Yatala	David Murray	Resigned	18 August 1881	6 September 1881	Josiah Howell Bagster
Onkaparinga	Friedrich Edouard Heinrich Wulf Krichauff	Resigned	22 May 1882	15 June 1882	Rowland Rees
Flinders	Ebenezer Cooke	Resigned	24 October 1882	1 December 1882	Patrick Boyce Coglin
Sturt	William Townsend	Died	25 October 1882	13 November 1882	Thomas King
Victoria	George Charles Hawker	Resigned	11 May 1883	15 June 1883	William Whinham

== See also ==
- Members of the South Australian Legislative Council, 1881–1885
- Members of the South Australian House of Assembly, 1881–1884
