= 11th Parliament of South Australia =

1884–1887 meeting of the South Australian Parliament

Eleventh Parliament of South Australia
←	10th	12th	→
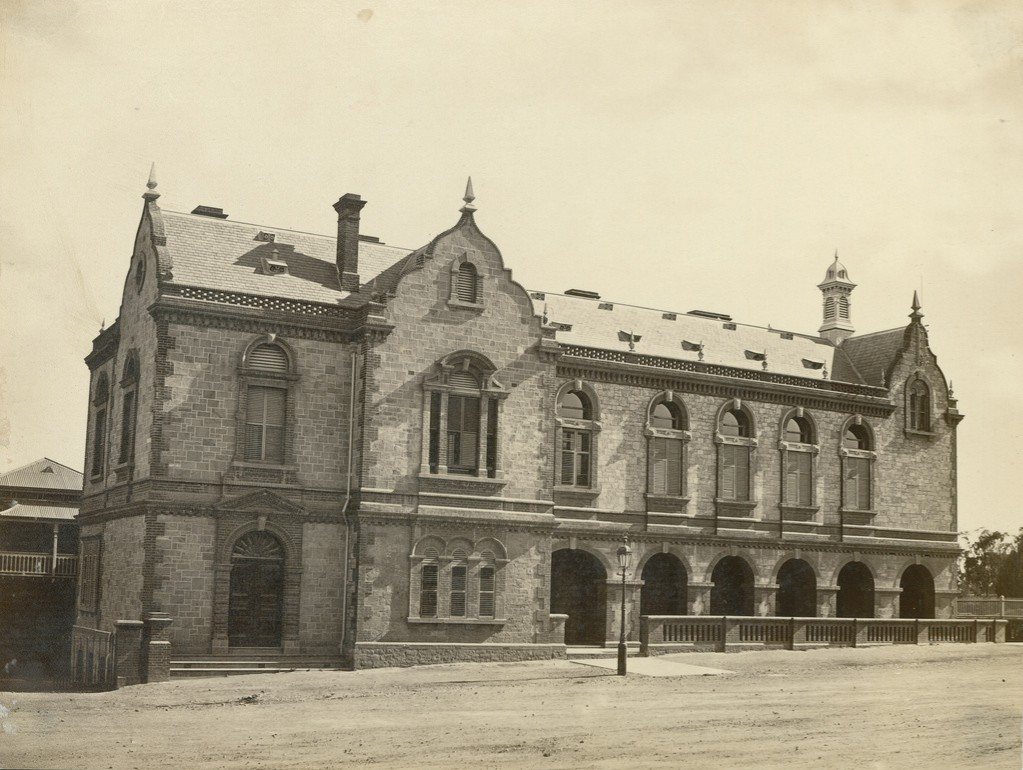
- Old Parliament House (1872)

Overview
- Legislative body: Parliament of South Australia
- Meeting place: Old Parliament House
- Term: 5 June 1884 – 2 March 1887
- Election: 8–23 April 1884

Legislative Council
- Members: 24
- President: Henry Ayers

House of Assembly
- Members: 52
- Speaker: Robert Dalrymple Ross

Sessions
- 1st: 5 June 1884 – 14 November 1884
- 2nd: 4 June 1885 – 11 December 1885
- 3rd: 27 May 1886 – 17 November 1886

The 11th Parliament of South Australia was a meeting of the legislative branch of the South Australian state government, composed of the South Australian Legislative Council and the South Australian House of Assembly.

== Leadership ==
Legislative Council

- President of the Legislative Council: Henry Ayers
- Clerk of the Legislative Council: Francis Corbet Singleton
- Clerk's assistant and Sergeant-at-arms: Frederick Halcomb

House of Assembly

- Speaker of the House of Assembly: Robert Dalrymple Ross
- Chairman of Committees: Ebenezer Ward
- Clerk of the House of Assembly: George William de la Poer Beresford (until 30 April 1886), Edwin Gordon Blackmore (from 5 May 1886)
- Clerk's assistant and Sargeant-at-arms: Edwin Gordon Blackmore (until 5 May 1886), John Cummins Morphett (from 5 May 1886)

== Membership ==
=== Legislative Council ===
==== Until 15 May 1885 ====
Members elected in 1882 are marked with an asterisk (*).

▌ Henry Ayers
▌ Richard Chaffey Baker
▌ William Christie Buik
▌ Allan Campbell
▌ George Witheredge Cotton*
▌ John Crozier
▌ John Dunn, jun.
▌ Thomas English*

▌ William Dening Glyde*
▌ Alexander Hay*
▌ Thomas Hogarth
▌ John Hodgkiss
▌ Alexander Borthwick Murray
▌ David Murray*
▌ James Pearce
▌ John Pickering

▌ James Garden Ramsay
▌ James Rankine
▌ Maurice Salom*
▌ William Sandover
▌ Henry Scott
▌ William Knox Simms (Central)
▌ John Brodie Spence
▌ Robert Alfred Tarlton

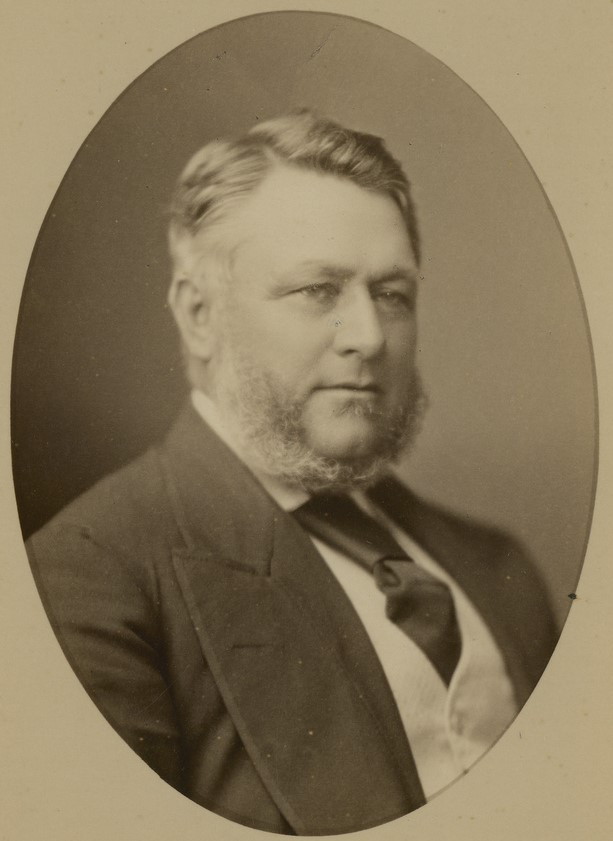
Legislative Council President
Henry Ayres

==== From 15 May 1885 ====
8 of the 24 seats in the upper house were contested in the election on 15 May 1885. Members elected in 1885 are marked with an asterisk (*).

▌ Henry Ayers
▌ Richard Chaffey Baker (Southern)*
▌ John Bosworth (North-Eastern)
▌ Henry Edward Bright (North-Eastern)*
▌ William Christie Buik
▌ Allan Campbell (Northern)*
▌ John Crozier (Central)*
▌ John Dunn, jun.

▌ William Dening Glyde
▌ Alexander Hay
▌ James Martin (North-Eastern)*
▌ Alexander Borthwick Murray
▌ David Murray
▌ John Pickering
▌ James Garden Ramsay
▌ James Rankine

▌ Maurice Salom
▌ Henry Scott (Central)*
▌ William Knox Simms (Central)
▌ John Brodie Spence
▌ Robert Alfred Tarlton
▌ Samuel Tomkinson (Southern)
▌ William Wadham (Northern)*
▌ William West-Erskine (Southern)*

=== House of Assembly ===
Albert

▌ Andrew Dods Handyside
▌ Arthur Hardy

Barossa

▌ Martin Peter Friedrich Basedow
▌ John William Downer

Burra

▌ John Alexander Cockburn
▌ William Benjamin Rounsevell

East Adelaide

▌ John Cox Bray
▌ Johann Theodor Scherk

East Torrens

▌ Thomas Playford
▌ Edwin Thomas Smith

Encounter Bay

▌ Henry Edward Downer
▌ Simpson Newland

Flinders

▌ John Moule
▌ Andrew Tennant

Frome

▌ William John Copley
▌ Ebenezer Ward

Gladstone

▌ Alfred Catt
▌ James Henderson Howe

Gumeracha

▌ Robert Homburg
▌ Robert Dalrymple Ross

Light

▌ Jenkin Coles
▌ David Moody

Mount Barker

▌ Albert Henry Landseer
▌ John Lancelot Stirling

Newcastle

▌ Thomas Burgoyne
▌ Patrick Boyce Coglin

Noarlunga

▌ Thomas Atkinson
▌ John Blackler Colton

North Adelaide

▌ George Charles Hawker
▌ Edward Charles Stirling

Onkaparinga

▌ Joseph Colin Francis Johnson
▌ Rowland Rees

Port Adelaide

▌ David Bower
▌ William Edward Mattinson

Stanley

▌ John Darling, sen.
▌ Edward William Hawker

Sturt

▌ Samuel Dening Glyde
▌ Josiah Henry Symon

Victoria

▌ John Bagot
▌ Friedrich Edouard Heinrich Wulf Krichauff

Wallaroo

▌ David Bews
▌ Luke Lidiard Furner

West Adelaide

▌ Arthur Aloysius Fox
▌ Charles Cameron Kingston

West Torrens

▌ Frederick Estcourt Bucknall
▌ Arthur Harvey

Wooroora

▌ John William Castine
▌ John James Duncan

Yatala

▌ Josiah Howell Bagster
▌ William Gilbert

Yorke Peninsula

▌ William Henry Beaglehole
▌ Robert Caldwell

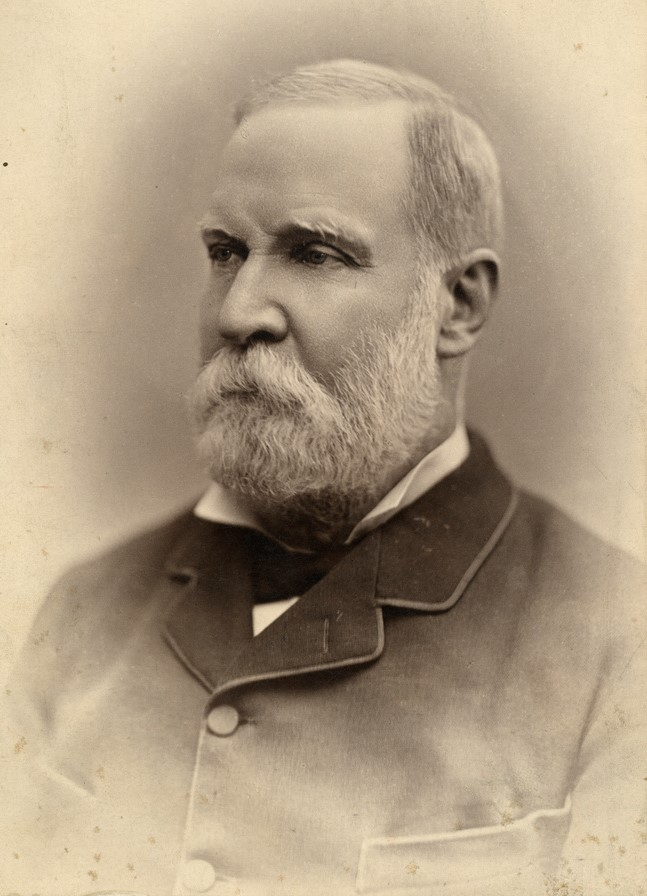
House of Assembly Speaker
Robert Dalrymple Ross

== Changes of membership ==
=== Legislative Council ===
Seat	Before	Change		After	
Seat	Member	Type	Date	Date	Member
Southern	Thomas English	Died	4 June 1885	7 July 1885	Samuel Tomkinson
North-Eastern	George Witheredge Cotton	Resigned	27 May 1886	28 June 1886	John Bosworth

=== House of Assembly ===
Seat	Before	Change		After	
Seat	Member	Type	Date	Date	Member
Albert	Rudolph Wilhelm Emil Henning	Died	24 November 1884	5 January 1885	Andrew Dods Handyside
Wallaroo	Henry Allerdale Grainger	Resigned	19 January 1885	16 February 1885	David Bews
Stanley	John Miller	Resigned	20 April 1885	15 May 1885	John Darling, sen.
Sturt	Thomas King	Resigned	6 July 1885	17 July 1885	Samuel Dening Glyde
Albert	Arthur Hardy	Resigned	8 February 1886	9 March 1886	Arthur Hardy
East Adelaide	George Dutton Green	Resigned	15 May 1886	31 May 1886	Johann Theodor Scherk

== See also ==
- Members of the South Australian Legislative Council, 1881–1885
- Members of the South Australian Legislative Council, 1885–1888
- Members of the South Australian House of Assembly, 1884–1887
