= Members of the South Australian Legislative Council, 1885–1888 =

This is a list of members of the South Australian Legislative Council from 1885 to 1888.

This was the first Legislative Council to be affected by the amendments to the Act, which provided for the Colony to be divided into four districts: (1) Central; (2) Southern; (3) North-Eastern and (4) Northern, with six members in each division; one third of each to be replaced in rotation every three years. Previously, the whole colony acted as one electoral district "The Province" with one third replaced at General Elections every four years. This and the following election (1888–1891) are notable for having members elected under both systems.

Name	District	Term expires	Time in office	Notes
John Howard Angas	Central		1887–1894	
Henry Ayers			1857–1888; 1888–1893	
Richard Chaffey Baker	Southern		1877–1901	re-elected 1885
John Bosworth	North-Eastern		1886–1894	elected 1886
Henry Edward Bright	North-Eastern		1885–1891	
William Christie Buik			1881–1888	
Allan Campbell	Northern		1878–1898	re-elected 1885
William Copley	Northern		1887–1894	
George Witheredge Cotton			1882–1886; 1888–1892	
John Crozier	Central		1867–1887	re-elected 1885 died 1887
John Dunn Jr.			1880–1888	
William Dening Glyde			1882–1887	
James Martin	North-Eastern		1885–1894	
Alexander Borthwick Murray			1880–1888	
John Pickering			1881–1888	
James Garden Ramsay			1880–1890	
James Rankine			1881–1888	
Maurice Salom	Northern		1882-1891	
Henry Scott	Central		1878–1891	re-elected 1885
William Knox Simms	Central		1884–1891	re-elected 1885
Alfred Muller Simpson	Central		1887–1894	elected 1887
John Brodie Spence			1881–1887	resigned vacancy declared June 1887
Robert Alfred Tarlton			1873–1888	
Samuel Tomkinson	Southern		1885–1894; 1897–1900	
William Wadham	Northern		1885–1888	retired 1888
William West-Erskine	Southern		1885–1891	
