= Members of the South Australian Legislative Council, 1881–1885 =

This is a list of members of the South Australian Legislative Council from 1881 to 1885.

This was the seventh and last Legislative Council to be elected under the Constitution of 1856, which provided for a house consisting of eighteen members to be elected from the whole colony acting as one electoral district "The Province"; that six members, selected by lot, should be replaced at General Elections after four years, another six to be replaced four years later and thenceforth each member should have a term of twelve years.

Six seats were declared vacant by rotation in 1881: Ayers, Fisher, Hay, Milne, Santo and Tarlton;

A significant feature of this election was the "ticket" recommending Rankine, Pickering, Tarlton, Hay, Ayers and Spence, issued by the South Australian Farmers' Mutual Association for members and other farmers to follow.

Ayers and Tarlton were re-elected; the other vacancies were filled by Buik, Pickering, Rankine and Spence.

A supplementary state-wide election was held on 29 May 1882 to prepare for the forthcoming reorganization of the Council, and six additional members were needed. Those elected were David Murray, Salom, English, Hay, Glyde and Cotton.

Name	Time in office	Term expires	Notes
Henry Ayers	1857–1888; 1888–1893		re-elected 1881
Richard Chaffey Baker	1877–1901		elected 1881
William Christie Buik	1881–1888		elected 1881
Allan Campbell	1878–1898		
George Witheredge Cotton	1882–1886; 1888–1892		elected 1882
John Crozier	1867–1887		
John Dunn Jr.	1880–1888		
Thomas English	1865–1878; 1882–1885		elected 1882
William Dening Glyde	1882–1887		elected 1882
Alexander Hay	1873–1881; 1882–1891		elected 1882
Thomas Hogarth	1866–1885		
William Morgan	1867–1884		died 1884
Alexander Borthwick Murray	1880–1888		
David Murray	1882–1891		elected 1882
James Pearce	1877–1885		
John Pickering	1881–1888		elected 1881
James Garden Ramsay	1880–1890		
James Rankine	1881–1888		elected 1881
Maurice Salom	1882-1891		elected 1882
William Sandover	1873–1885		
Henry Scott	1878–1891		
William Knox Simms	1884–1891		elected 1884 to Central District (first under Constitution Act Further Amendment Act 1881)
John Brodie Spence	1881–1887		elected 1881
Robert Alfred Tarlton	1873–1888		re-elected 1881
