= Members of the South Australian Legislative Council, 1877–1881 =

This is a list of members of the South Australian Legislative Council from 1877 to 1881.

This was the sixth Legislative Council to be elected under the Constitution of 1856, which provided for a house consisting of eighteen members to be elected from the whole colony acting as one electoral district ("The Province"); that six members, selected by lot, should be replaced at General Elections after four years, another six to be replaced four years later and thenceforth each member should have a term of twelve years.

Six seats were declared vacant by rotation in 1877, filled by Morgan, Crozier, Baker, English, Pearce and Hughes.

Name	Time in office	Term expires	Notes
Henry Ayers	1857–1888; 1888–1893	Feb. 1881	
Richard Chaffey Baker	1877–1901		elected Apr. 1877
Allan Campbell	1878–		elected Sep. 1878
John Crozier	1867–1887		returned 1877
Walter Duffield	1873–1880		
John Dunn Jr.	1880–1888		elected Jul 1880
Thomas Elder	1863–1869; 1871–1878		
Thomas English	1865–1878; 1882–1885		returned 1877
William Everard	1873–1878		
Joseph Fisher	1873–1881	Feb. 1881	
Alexander Hay	1873–1881	Feb. 1881	
John Hodgkiss	1866–1872; 1878–1884	Feb. 1877	elected Sep. 1878
Thomas Hogarth	1866–1885		
Henry Kent Hughes	1877–1880		elected Apr. 1877, resigned 1880
William Milne	1869–1881	Feb. 1881	
William Morgan	1867–1884		returned 1877
Alexander Borthwick Murray	1880–1888		elected Jul. 1880
James Pearce	1877–1885		elected April 1877
James Garden Ramsay	1880–1890		elected Jul. 1880
William Sandover	1873–1885		
Philip Santo	1871–1881	Feb. 1881	
Henry Scott	1878–1891		elected Sep. 1878
William Storrie	1871–1878		
Robert Alfred Tarlton	1873–1888	Feb. 1881	
Charles Burney Young	1878–1880		elected Sep. 1878; resigned 1880
