= Josiah Howell Bagster =

Australian politician

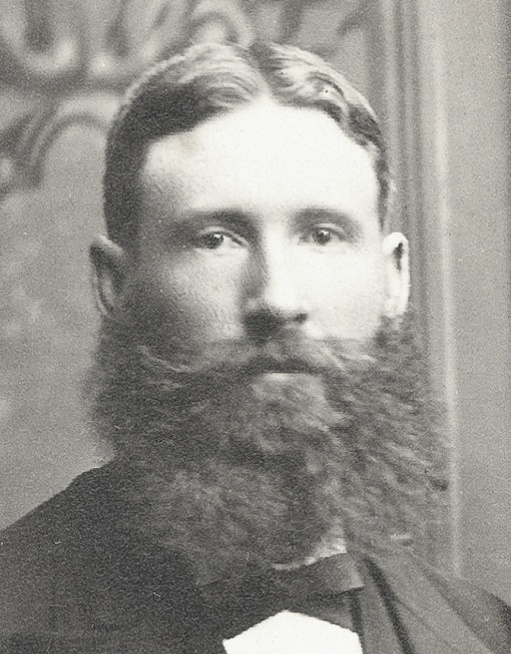

Member for Yatala (South Australian House of Assembly)
- In office 6 September 1881 – April 1890

Personal details
- Born: 19 February 1847 Ledbury, Herefordshire, England
- Died: 17 October 1893 (aged 46) Unley, South Australia

Josiah Howell Bagster (19 February 1847 – 17 October 1893) was a businessman and politician in the British colony of South Australia.

During the 1870s Bagster established himself as in business as a land and estate agent and for several years served on the municipal council at Unley township, just south of Adelaide. In September 1881 he was elected as one of two members for the electorate of Yatala in the South Australian House of Assembly. After a controversial vote against the Playford ministry in June 1889, Bagster was defeated in the polls at the April 1890 general election.

== Biography ==
=== Early years ===
Josiah Howell Bagster was born on 19 February 1847 at Ledbury, county Herefordshire, the son of Josiah Shirley Bagster and Elizabeth (née Howell). His father was in business as a stationer. Bagster's baptism record lists his name as 'Joseph Howell Bagster', but throughout his life he was known as Josiah.^{[A]}

Josiah and Elizabeth Bagster and two year-old Josiah emigrated to South Australia aboard the Caroline, departing from Plymouth in May 1849 and arriving at Adelaide in September. The family settled at Unley, an inner suburb south of Adelaide.

Young Josiah attended S. Webster's commercial school in Grenfell Street, Adelaide.

=== Work and local government ===
In about 1862, when Bagster was fifteen, he began an apprenticeship in the Government Printing Office, where he worked for the following ten years.

Upon leaving the Government Printing Office Bagster "went into commercial pursuits, and dealt a great deal in land". In later years "his attention had been turned towards agricultural property of a less speculative nature".

Josiah H. Bagster and Eleanor Winzor were married on 31 December 1872 at the Stowe Memorial church in Flinders Street, Adelaide. The couple had three children, born from November 1873 to January 1878.^{[B]}

In June 1876, "having some leisure and a desire for entering upon public life", Bagster accepted a nomination as a councillor of the municipality of Unley. He was nominated for the Goodwood ward of the Corporate Town of Unley, in place of Cr. John Weller who had died in March 1876. As no other candidate was nominated, Bagster was declared to be "duly elected". Polling for the mayor and councillors of the Unley municipality was held on 1 December 1876. Bagster topped the poll against one other candidate for the Goodwood ward and was re-elected as a councillor.

At a special meeting of the Unley Corporation on 19 March 1877 Henry Codd tendered his resignation as mayor of Unley, as he intended to leave for England "in response to domestic claims, and to recruit his health". Bagster then resigned his seat as councillor, in order to become a candidate for mayor. Bagster was the only nominated candidate and was declared to be elected mayor of Unley at a meeting on 31 March 1877. In early December 1877 Bagster was elected as mayor, unopposed, for the following twelve months. Bagster declined to put himself forward for local government positions at the December 1878 municipal elections.

In February 1879 Bagster was appointed as a justice of the peace. He later served as a member of the Adelaide Licensing Bench. Bagster was on the boards of several public companies.

Bagster was a member of the Central Road Board for nine years during the 1880s. He was a member of the Unley and Mitcham School Board of Advice for nine years.

=== Political career ===
At the South Australian colonial elections of April 1878 Bagster was a candidate for the two-member Yatala electorate in the House of Assembly. However his bid for a seat was unsuccessful; of the four candidates he polled last with only 114 votes (or 15.1 percent).

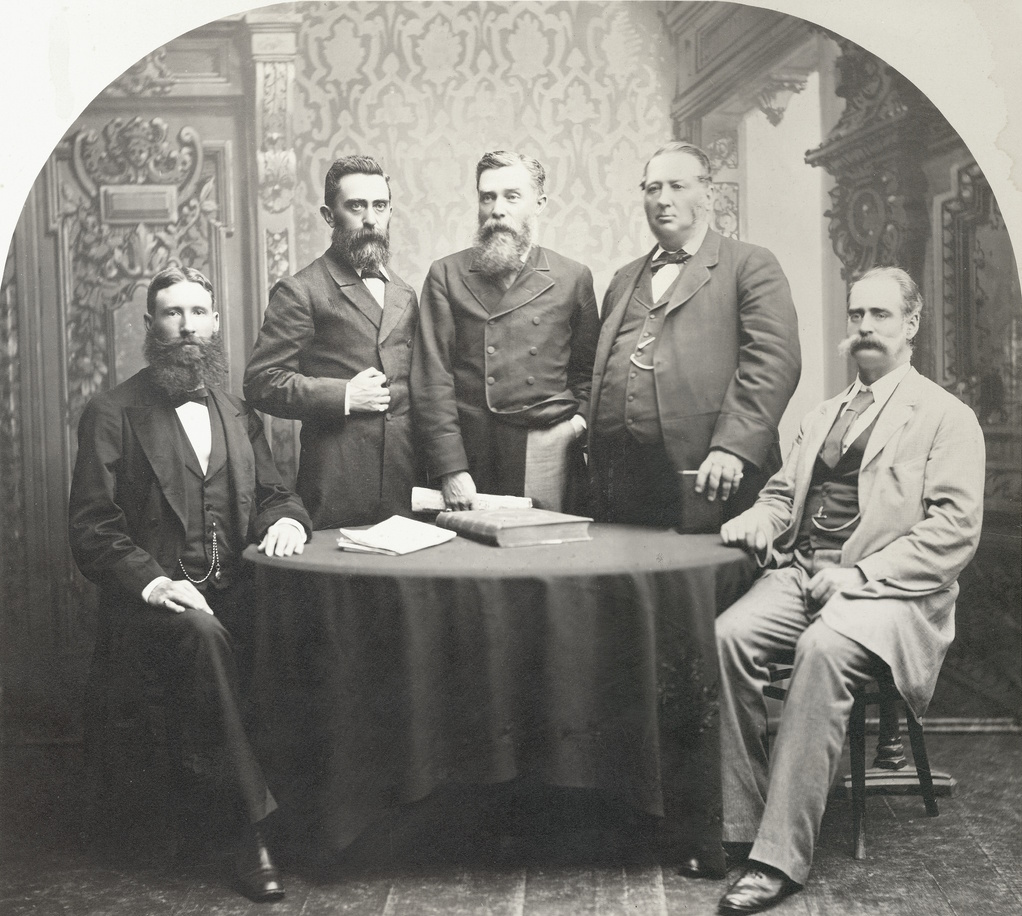
Members of the Government party who visited the Northern Territory in 1882 (left to right: Josiah H. Bagster, Luke Furner, John L. Parsons, Henry E. Bright and Professor Tate).

In 1881 the electorate of Yatala was the subject of a general election and two subsequent by-elections within the space of five months. At the general election of 1881 William Gilbert and David Murray were elected for the two-member electorate. In June Murray was unseated after being found guilty of bribery and corruption. At a by-election in July 1881 for the vacant seat Murray was once again a candidate and topped the poll "by a heavy majority". However, as Murray was still disqualified to occupy a seat in the Legislative Assembly, he resigned his position necessitating another by-election. On this occasion Bagster decided to become a candidate. At the by-election held on 6 September 1881, Bagster was one of three candidates and he topped the poll with 195 votes (53.3 percent). Bagster and William Gilbert, who was elected in April 1881, served as the members for Yatala in the South Australian House of Assembly. During public addresses to electors prior to the poll Bagster had expressed his adherence to the principle of free trade (in an era when political allegiances were broadly determined by conformity to one or other of the contrasting economic policies of protectionism or free trade).

Bagster was one of the members of parliament selected for a ministerial visit to the Northern Territory in early 1882. The delegation was led by the Minister of Education, John Langdon Parsons, and also included the parliamentarians Luke Furner and Henry Edward Bright, as well as the geologist Professor Tate. The purpose of the visit was to enquire "into the present state of the Territory", including its mineral and agricultural resources and assess future requirements for public works. The party left Adelaide in late January 1882 and travelled to Melbourne and Sydney and then by sea to Port Darwin. The delegation travelled to Palmerston to meet with government officials, then by water to Southport and on horseback to Rum Jungle, down the Adelaide River, then to Howley and on to the Port Darwin Camp. They visited gold-mining districts at Spring Hill and Pine Creek) and the tin discoveries at Mount Wells. The prospects for coffee and sugar cane plantations were also investigated. The party returned to Adelaide by sea in late March.

By late 1882 Josiah Bagster and his family were living at 'Yatala House' in Mary Street, Unley. Bagster's wife Eleanor died on 7 February 1884 at Unley, aged 34.

By the mid 1880s Bagster was referred to as a "land agent". In June 1884 his business premises as a "land and estate agent" was located at the old Exchange in King William Street, Adelaide. He advertised as having "land and house properties of every description" for sale, with "special attention given to country lands".

At the general election held in April 1884 the sitting members, Bagster and Gilbert, polled ahead of a third candidate and were returned as the members for Yatala. Of the two successful candidates, Bagster polled second with 335 votes (33.7 percent).

Josiah H. Bagster and Mary Ann Harvey were married at Salisbury on 22 April 1885 (his second marriage). Mary Ann was the only daughter of John Harvey, a prominent landholder and magistrate of Salisbury township, north of Adelaide. The couple had two children, born in 1886 and 1888.^{[C]}

At the 1887 election held in March and April 1887 the sitting members, Bagster and Gilbert, polled ahead of a third candidate and were returned as the members for Yatala. Bagster received the most votes (571 votes, or 39.8 percent).

After two years in office, the South Australian government led by Thomas Playford was defeated in a no confidence motion moved in the House of Assembly by Dr. John Cockburn, the member for Mount Barker. After a lengthy debate the motion was carried by twenty-six votes to twenty-three in the early hours of 22 June 1889. After the resignation of the Playford ministry, a new ministry was formed under Cockburn's leadership. On 27 June, at the first sitting of the House of Assembly after Cockburn's ministry was announced, Charles Kingston, the previous Attorney-General in Playford's government, delivered a scathing attack on a group of members (including Bagster) who Kingston accused of changing their vote after assurances of support for the Playford ministry. In singling out Bagster, Kingston accused the member for Yatala of acting "in an inconsistent and improper manner" after having received from him personal assurances that he would support the late government.

William Gilbert, Bagster's fellow member for Yatala, had also voted against the Playford government in the no-confidence motion. Both Bagster and Gilbert attended a meeting on 8 July at the Dublin Institute Hall to explain and justify their reasons for voting in the manner that they did.

At the 1890 election held in April 1890 eight candidates contested for the electorate of Yatala. The two members returned for the seats were the sitting member William Gilbert and the wealthy flour miller and investor James Cowan. Bagster was decisively rejected by the electors of Yatala, attracting only 104 votes (5.5 percent). One newspaper comment on the result described Bagster as one "who never was guilty of an excess of political acumen". One writer described Bagster as "one of the most inoffensive and amiable men whom I have ever met in politics", adding: "He had an ambition at one time to occupy a Ministerial office but he was too good-natured to be ever officially prominent, and he really had not a great deal of what may be best called solid marketable ability in politics".

=== Last years ===
Bagster was on the board of the Zoological Society. From February 1890 he filled the position of acting-director of the Zoological Gardens during the three months' leave of absence of its director, Richard E. Minchin.

Bagster's financial situation had declined by 1890. In August 1890 a meeting of his creditors revealed debts of over six thousand pounds and no assets.

Josiah Howell Bagster died at his home in Mary Street, Unley, on the morning of 17 October 1893, aged 46. Bagster had been suffering "for some time" from ulcerations of the liver and lungs. On 11 October 1893 he underwent an operation to remove ulcers from his liver and lungs. On 17 October he suffered a haemorrhage and died within five minutes.

== Notes ==
A.Bagster's father, Josiah Shirley Bagster, was born on 10 July 1811. He was baptised on 8 January 1812 at Partridge Lane Independent Church, Faversham in county Kent, England. He married Elizabeth Howell at St James Church, Westminster, London in the second quarter of 1841. The married couple were recorded at Ledbury, in county Herefordshire, in the 1841 census conducted on 6 June 1841. Josiah S. Bagster died on 6 March 1882.

B.Eleanor Winzor, was born on 13 December 1849, the seventh and youngest daughter of John Winzor of Adelaide. Josiah and Eleanor Bagster had three children: Winifred (born 19 November 1873); Shirley Winzor (born 29 April 1875), married Hannah Mabel Slatter on 7 July 1909, died 26 August 1932; Geraldine (born 12 January 1878, died 16 January 1883).

C.Mary Ann Bagster (née Harvey) (1 November 1847 – 28 May 1931), the daughter of John Harvey and Ann (née Pitman) of Salisbury, north of Adelaide. Her father, John Harvey, had been a member of parliament from 1857 to 1860, representing the electorate of Yatala. Josiah and Mary Ann Bagster had two children: Lancelot Salisbury (born 9 August 1886, died 14 March 1940) and Mabel Gwendoline (born 27 March 1888).
