= Premier of South Australia =

Head of government

- South Australian coat of arms

- Flag of South Australia

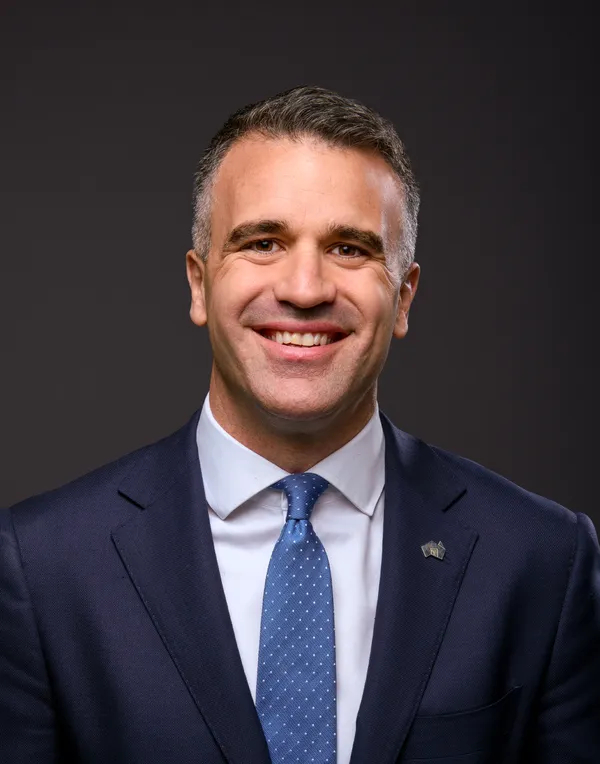
- Incumbent; Peter Malinauskas since 21 March 2022
- Department of the Premier and Cabinet; Government of South Australia
- Style: The Honourable (formal); Premier (informal)
- Status: Head of government
- Member of: Parliament; National Cabinet; Cabinet; Executive Council
- Reports to: Parliament
- Seat: State Administration Centre; 200 Victoria Square, Adelaide
- Appointer: Governor of South Australia; by convention, based on appointee's ability to command confidence in the House of Assembly
- Term length: At the governor's pleasure; contingent on the premier's ability to command confidence in the House of Assembly
- Constituting instrument: None (constitutional convention)
- Formation: 24 October 1856
- First holder: Boyle Finniss
- Deputy: Deputy Premier of South Australia
- Salary: A$435,546 (2025)
- Website: www.premier.sa.gov.au

The Premier of South Australia is the head of government in the Australian state of South Australia. The Government of South Australia follows the Westminster system, with the Parliament of South Australia acting as the legislature. The Premier is appointed by the Governor of South Australia, and by modern convention holds office by virtue of their ability to command the support of a majority of members of the lower house of Parliament, the House of Assembly.

Peter Malinauskas is the current Premier, having served since 21 March 2022. Thomas Playford IV is the longest serving Premier, and the longest serving head of government in Australian history, serving for over 26 years from 1938 until 1965, holding on to power thanks to the "Playmander" system of district apportionment.

== History ==
The office of Premier of South Australia was established upon the commencement of responsible government with the passage of the Constitution Act 1856. The role was based upon that of the prime minister of the United Kingdom, with the premier requiring the support of a majority of the members of the lower house to remain head of government. For the early years of responsible government, the office was held in conjunction with that of Chief Secretary of South Australia, a role that had existed since colonisation, but by the 1890s, this was no longer a convention.

No parties or solid groupings would be formed until after the 1890 election, which resulted in frequent changes of the premier of South Australia. If for any reason the incumbent premier lost sufficient support through a successful motion of no confidence at any time on the floor of the house, he would tender his resignation to the governor of South Australia, which would result in another member deemed to have the support of the House of Assembly being sworn in by the governor as the next premier.

Informal groupings began and increased government stability occurred from the 1887 election. The United Labor Party would be formed in 1891, while the National Defence League would be formed later in the same year.

Before the 1890s when there was no formal party system in South Australia, MPs tended to have historical liberal or conservative beliefs. The liberals dominated government from the 1893 election to 1905 election with the support of the South Australian United Labor Party, with the conservatives mostly in opposition. Labor took government with the support of eight dissident liberals in 1905 when Labor won the most seats for the first time. The rise of Labor saw non-Labor politics start to merge into various party incarnations.

The two independent conservative parties, the Australasian National League (formerly the National Defence League) and the Farmers and Producers Political Union merged with the Liberal and Democratic Union to become the Liberal Union in 1910. Labor formed South Australia's first majority government after winning the 1910 state election, triggering the merger. The 1910 election came two weeks after federal Labor formed Australia's first elected majority government at the 1910 federal election.

No "Country" or rural conservative parties emerged as serious long-term forces in South Australian state politics, the majority folding into the main non-Labor party.

== List of premiers of South Australia ==
The first six governors of South Australia oversaw governance from proclamation in 1836 until self-government and an elected Parliament of South Australia was enacted in the year prior to the inaugural 1857 election.

Political parties

Independent
Liberalism
Conservatism
Liberal Federation/Union
Liberal & Country
Liberal
Labor

No.	Portrait	Name Birth–death Constituency	Election Parliament	Term of office					Political party	Ministry
No.	Portrait	Name Birth–death Constituency	Election Parliament	Took office	Age started	Left office	Age left	Time in office	Political party	Ministry
Colonial Government (1856–1901)
1		Boyle Finniss (1807–1893); MHA for Adelaide	1857 (1st)	24 October 1856	49	21 August 1857	50	301 days	Independent	Finniss
2		John Baker (1813–1872); Councillor	— (1st)	21 August 1857	44	1 September 1857	44	11 days	Independent	Baker
3		Robert Richard Torrens (1814–1884); MHA for Adelaide	— (1st)	1 September 1857	43	30 September 1857	43	29 days	Independent	Torrens
4		Richard Hanson (1805–1876); MHA for Adelaide	— (1st)	30 September 1857	52	9 May 1860	55	2 years, 222 days	Independent	Hanson
5		Thomas Reynolds (1818–1875); MHA for Adelaide	1860 (2nd)	9 May 1860	42	8 October 1861	43	1 year, 152 days	Independent	Reynolds I Reynolds II
6		George Waterhouse (1824–1906); Councillor	— (2nd); 1862 (3rd)	8 October 1861	37	4 July 1863	39	1 year, 269 days	Independent	Waterhouse I Waterhouse II
7		Francis Dutton (1818–1877); MHA for Light	— (3rd)	4 July 1863	45	15 July 1863	45	11 days	Independent	Dutton I
8		Henry Ayers (1821–1897); Councillor	— (3rd)	15 July 1863	42	4 August 1864	43	1 year, 20 days	Independent	Ayers I Ayers II
9		Arthur Blyth (1823–1891); MHA for Gumeracha	— (3rd)	4 August 1864	41	22 March 1865	42	230 days	Independent	Blyth I
(7)		Francis Dutton (1818–1877); MHA for Light	1865 (4th)	22 March 1865	47	20 September 1865	47	182 days	Independent	Dutton II
(8)		Henry Ayers (1821–1897); Councillor	— (4th)	20 September 1865	44	23 October 1865	44	33 days	Independent	Ayers III
10		John Hart (1809–1873); MHA for Port Adelaide	— (4th)	23 October 1865	56	28 March 1866	57	156 days	Independent	Hart I
11		James Boucaut (1831–1916); MHA for Encounter Bay	— (4th)	28 March 1866	35	3 May 1867	36	1 year, 36 days	Independent	Boucaut I
(8)		Henry Ayers (1821–1897); Councillor	— (4th); 1868 (5th)	3 May 1867	46	24 September 1868	47	1 year, 144 days	Independent	Ayers IV
(10)		John Hart (1809–1873); MHA for Light	— (5th)	24 September 1868	59	13 October 1868	59	19 days	Independent	Hart II
(8)		Henry Ayers (1821–1897); Councillor	— (5th)	13 October 1868	47	3 November 1868	47	21 days	Independent	Ayers V
12		Henry Strangways (1832–1920); MHA for West Torrens	— (5th); 1870 (6th)	3 November 1868	36	30 May 1870	38	1 year, 208 days	Independent	Strangways I Strangways II
(10)		John Hart (1809–1873); MHA for The Burra	— (6th)	30 May 1870	61	10 November 1871	62	1 year, 164 days	Independent	Hart III
(9)		Arthur Blyth (1823–1891); MHA for Gumeracha	— (6th); 1871 (7th)	10 November 1871	48	22 January 1872	49	73 days	Independent	Blyth II
(8)		Henry Ayers (1821–1897); Councillor	— (7th)	22 January 1872	51	22 July 1873	52	1 year, 151 days	Independent	Ayers VI; Ayers VII
(9)		Arthur Blyth (1823–1891); MHA for Gumeracha	— (7th); 1875 (8th)	22 July 1873	50	3 June 1875	52	1 year, 316 days	Independent	Blyth III
(11)		James Boucaut (1831–1916); MHA for Encounter Bay	— (8th)	3 June 1875	44	6 June 1876	45	1 year, 3 days	Independent	Boucaut II; Boucaut III
13		John Colton (1823–1902); MHA for Noarlunga	— (8th)	6 June 1876	53	26 October 1877	54	1 year, 142 days	Independent	Colton I
(11)		James Boucaut (1831–1916); MHA for Encounter Bay	— (8th); 1878 (9th)	26 October 1877	46	27 September 1878	47	336 days	Independent	Boucaut IV
14		William Morgan (1828–1883); Councillor	— (9th); 1881 (10th)	27 September 1878	50	24 June 1881	53	2 years, 270 days	Independent	Morgan
15		John Bray (1842–1894); MHA for East Adelaide	— (10th); 1884 (11th)	24 June 1881	39	16 June 1884	42	2 years, 358 days	Independent	Bray
(13)		John Colton (1823–1902); MHA for Noarlunga	— (11th)	16 June 1884	61	16 June 1885	62	1 year, 0 days	Independent	Colton II
16		John Downer (1843–1915); MHA for Barossa	— (11th); 1887 (12th)	16 June 1885	42	11 June 1887	44	1 year, 360 days	Independent	Downer I
17		Thomas Playford (1837–1915); MHA for Newcastle	— (12th)	11 June 1887	50	27 June 1889	52	2 years, 16 days	Independent	Playford II I
18		John Cockburn (1850–1929); MHA for Mount Barker	— (12th); 1890 (13th)	27 June 1889	39	19 August 1890	40	1 year, 53 days	Liberalism	Cockburn
(17)		Thomas Playford (1837–1915); MHA for East Torrens	— (13th)	19 August 1890	53	21 June 1892	55	1 year, 307 days	Conservatism	Playford II II
19		Frederick Holder (1850–1909); MHA for Burra	— (13th)	21 June 1892	42	15 October 1892	42	116 days	Liberalism	Holder I
(16)		John Downer (1843–1915); MHA for Barossa	— (13th)	15 October 1892	49	16 June 1893	50	244 days	Conservatism	Downer II
20		Charles Kingston (1850–1908); MHA for West Adelaide	1893 (14th); 1896 (15th); 1899 (16th)	16 June 1893	43	1 December 1899	49	6 years, 168 days	Liberalism	Kingston
21		Vaiben Solomon (1853–1908); MHA for Northern Territory	— (16th)	1 December 1899	46	8 December 1899	46	7 days	Conservatism	Solomon
(19)		Frederick Holder (1850–1909); MHA for Burra	— (16th)	8 December 1899	49	15 May 1901	51	1 year, 158 days	Liberalism	Holder II
State Government (1901–present)
22		John Jenkins (1851–1923); MHA for Torrens	— (16th); 1902 (17th)	15 May 1901	50	1 March 1905	54	3 years, 290 days	Liberalism	Jenkins
23		Richard Butler (1850–1925); MHA for Barossa	— (17th)	1 March 1905	55	26 July 1905	55	147 days	Conservatism	Butler I
24		Thomas Price (1852–1909); MHA for Torrens	1905 (18th); 1906 (19th)	26 July 1905	53	31 May 1909 (†)	57	3 years, 309 days	United Labor	Price
25		Archibald Peake (1859–1920); MHA for Victoria & Albert	— (19th)	5 June 1909	50	3 June 1910	51	363 days	Liberal & Democratic Union	Peake I
26		John Verran (1856–1932); MHA for Wallaroo	1910 (20th)	3 June 1910	54	17 February 1912	56	1 year, 259 days	United Labor	Verran
(25)		Archibald Peake (1859–1920)	1912 (21st)	17 February 1912	53	3 April 1915	56	3 years, 45 days	Liberal Union	Peake II
27		Crawford Vaughan (1874–1947); MHA for Sturt	1915 (22nd)	3 April 1915	41	14 July 1917	43	2 years, 102 days	United Labor	Vaughan
(25)		Archibald Peake (1859–1920)	— (22nd); 1918 (23rd)	14 July 1917	58	6 April 1920 (†)	61	2 years, 267 days	Liberal Union	Peake III
28		Henry Barwell (1877–1959); MHA for Stanley	— (23rd); 1921 (24th)	8 April 1920	43	16 April 1924	47	4 years, 8 days	Liberal Union (until 1923); Liberal Federation (from 1923)	Barwell
29		John Gunn (1884–1959); MHA for Adelaide	1924 (25th)	16 April 1924	40	28 August 1926	42	2 years, 134 days	Labor	Gunn
30		Lionel Hill (1881–1963); MHA for Port Pirie	— (25th)	28 August 1926	45	8 April 1927	46	223 days	Labor	Hill I
31		Richard L. Butler (1885–1966); MHA for Wooroora	1927 (26th)	8 April 1927	42	17 April 1930	45	3 years, 9 days	Liberal Federation	Butler II I
(30)		Lionel Hill (1881–1963)	1930 (27th)	17 April 1930	49	13 February 1933	52	2 years, 302 days	Labor	Hill II
32		Robert Richards (1885–1967); MHA for Wallaroo	— (27th)	13 February 1933	48	18 April 1933	48	64 days	Labor	Richards
(31)		Richard L. Butler (1885–1966)	1933 (28th); 1938 (29th)	18 April 1933	48	5 November 1938	53	5 years, 201 days	Liberal and Country League	Butler II II
33		Thomas Playford (1896–1981); MHA for Gumeracha	— (29th); 1941 (30th); 1944 (31st); 1947 (32nd); 1950 (33rd); 1953 (34th); 1956 (35th); 1959 (36th); 1962 (37th)	5 November 1938	42	10 March 1965	69	26 years, 125 days	Liberal and Country League	Playford IV I Playford IV II
34		Frank Walsh (1897–1968); MHA for Edwardstown	1965 (38th)	10 March 1965	68	1 June 1967	70	2 years, 83 days	Labor	Walsh
35		Don Dunstan (1926–1999); MHA for Norwood	— (38th)	1 June 1967	41	17 April 1968	42	321 days	Labor	Dunstan I
36		Steele Hall (1928–2024); MHA for Gouger	1968 (39th)	17 April 1968	40	2 June 1970	42	2 years, 46 days	Liberal and Country League	Hall
(35)		Don Dunstan (1926–1999); MHA for Norwood	1970 (40th); 1973 (41st); 1975 (42nd); 1977 (43rd)	2 June 1970	44	15 February 1979	53	8 years, 258 days	Labor	Dunstan II
37		Des Corcoran (1928–2004); MHA for Hartley	— (43rd)	15 February 1979	51	18 September 1979	51	215 days	Labor	Corcoran
38		David Tonkin (1929–2000); MHA for Bragg	1979 (44th)	18 September 1979	50	10 November 1982	53	3 years, 53 days	Liberal	Tonkin
39		John Bannon (1943–2015); MHA for Ross Smith	1982 (45th); 1985 (46th); 1989 (47th)	10 November 1982	39	4 September 1992	49	9 years, 299 days	Labor	Bannon
40		Lynn Arnold (born 1949); MHA for Ramsay	— (47th)	4 September 1992	43	14 December 1993	44	1 year, 101 days	Labor	Arnold
41		Dean Brown (born 1943); MHA for Finniss	1993 (48th)	14 December 1993	50	28 November 1996	53	2 years, 350 days	Liberal	Brown
42		John Olsen (born 1945); MHA for Kavel	— (48th); 1997 (49th)	28 November 1996	51	22 October 2001	56	4 years, 328 days	Liberal	Olsen
43		Rob Kerin (born 1954); MHA for Frome	— (49th)	22 October 2001	47	5 March 2002	48	165 days	Liberal	Kerin
44		Mike Rann (born 1953); MHA for Ramsay	2002 (50th); 2006 (51st); 2010 (52nd)	5 March 2002	49	21 October 2011	58	9 years, 230 days	Labor	Rann
45		Jay Weatherill (born 1964); MHA for Cheltenham	— (52nd); 2014 (53rd)	21 October 2011	47	19 March 2018	54	6 years, 149 days	Labor	Weatherill
46		Steven Marshall (born 1968); MHA for Dunstan	2018 (54th)	19 March 2018	50	21 March 2022	54	4 years, 2 days	Liberal	Marshall
47		Peter Malinauskas (born 1980); MHA for Croydon	2022 (55th); 2026 (56th)	21 March 2022	42	—	—	4 years, 236 days	Labor	Malinauskas I Malinauskas II

== See also ==
- List of premiers of South Australia by time in office
- Deputy Premier of South Australia
- Leader of the Opposition (South Australia)
