= 1882 South Australian Legislative Council election =

A special election was held on 29 May 1882 in South Australia to increase the size of the Legislative Council from 18 to 24 members. The change in size of the council was a consequence of the Constitution Act Further Amendment Act 1881 which had been passed the previous year.

A total of 14 candidates stood for election to the six seats. The successful candidates were:.

- George Witherage Cotton
- William Dening Glyde
- Alexander Hay
- Thomas English
- Maurice Salom
- David Murray
