= 1881 South Australian colonial election =

- 8−27 April 1881

All seats in the South Australian House of Assembly
- Results by electoral district for the House of Assembly

Colonial elections were held in South Australia from 8 April to 27 April 1881. All 46 seats in the South Australian House of Assembly were up for election, along with six of the 18 seats in the South Australian Legislative Council.

The Boucaut government which had taken the parliament into the 1878 election lasted only four months before it was defeated by William Morgan, who brought the first real stability to government. Morgan took the parliament through a full term, and into the 1881 election.

== House of Assembly ==
Since the inaugural 1857 election, no parties or solid groupings had been formed, which resulted in frequent changes of the Premier. If for any reason the incumbent Premier of South Australia lost sufficient support through a successful motion of no confidence at any time on the floor of the house, he would tender his resignation to the Governor of South Australia, which would result in another member deemed to have the support of the House of Assembly being sworn in by the Governor as the next Premier.

Informal groupings began and increased government stability occurred from the 1887 election. The United Labor Party would be formed in 1891, while the National Defence League would be formed later in the same year.

== Legislative Council ==
The franchise for the South Australian Legislative Council was more limited, requiring voters to meet a minimum value of land owned.

Six Members were elected in April 1881. They were:

- William Christie Buik
- James Rankine
- John Pickering
- Sir Henry Ayers
- Robert Alfred Tarlton
- John Brodie Spence

Ayers and Tarlton had been members whose terms had expired just before the election and they were re-elected.

== See also ==
- Premier of South Australia
