= 1890 South Australian colonial election =

- 9 April 1890

All 54 seats in the South Australian House of Assembly 27 seats were needed for a majority
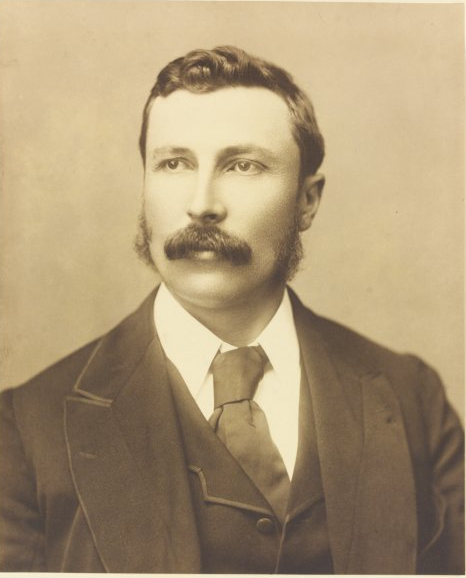

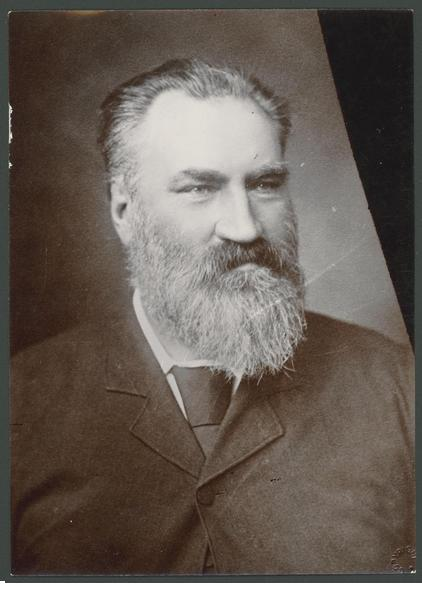
	First party	Second party
Leader	John Cockburn	Thomas Playford
Party	Liberal	Conservative
Leader's seat	Burra	Onkaparinga
- Results by electoral district for the House of Assembly
Premier before election
John Cockburn
Liberal
Elected Premier
John Cockburn
Liberal

Colonial elections were held in South Australia from 9 April to 23 April 1890. All 54 seats in the South Australian House of Assembly were up for election.

The Northern Territory became an electorate for the House of Assembly, increasing the House to 54 members, elected from twenty seven 2-member districts. The divisions between the conservative and radical groups in the Assembly continued after the 1887 election, as did the instability. The Downer (conservative) government was defeated immediately after the election, and the Playford (radical) government was formed. After two years, the more radical Cockburn group replaced the Playford government, and took the parliament into the election.

The incumbent government led by Premier of South Australia John Cockburn defeated the opposition led by Leader of the Opposition Thomas Playford II. Each district elected multiple members, with voters casting multiple votes.

House of Assembly (FPTP) — Turnout 53.10% (Non-CV) — Informal N/A
Party	Votes	%	Swing	Seats	Change
Independent	66,407	100.00	*	54	*
Total	66,407			54	

Since the inaugural 1857 election, no parties or solid groupings had been formed, which resulted in frequent changes of the Premier. If for any reason the incumbent Premier lost sufficient support through a successful motion of no confidence at any time on the floor of the house, he would tender his resignation to the Governor of South Australia, which would result in another member deemed to have the support of the House of Assembly being sworn in by the Governor as the next Premier.

However, from the 1887 election there began a growing informal division between groups of members who were loosely described as ‘conservative’ and ‘radical’ by the press. The ‘conservatives’ found their leaders in John Cox Bray and John William Downer, while the ‘radicals’ were led by John Colton, Thomas Playford and John Cockburn. The leaders often contested government against their reported allies in loose alliances, producing an element of political ‘structure’ which began to see a trend emerge toward increased government stability. The United Labor Party would be formed in 1891, while the National Defence League would be formed later in the same year.

== See also ==
- Premier of South Australia
- Members of the South Australian House of Assembly, 1890–1893
- Members of the South Australian Legislative Council, 1891–1894
