= William Milne (politician) =

Australian politician

The Honourable Sir William Milne Kt
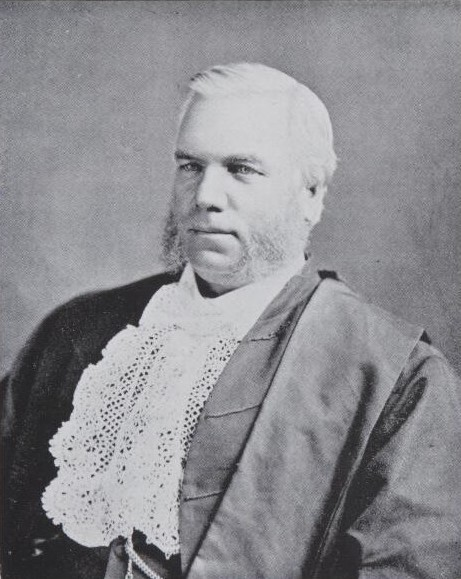

President of the South Australian Legislative Council
- In office 25 July 1873 – 19 April 1881
- Preceded by: John Morphett
- Succeeded by: Henry Ayers

Chief Secretary of South Australia
- In office 30 May 1870 – 22 January 1872
- Premier: John Hart; Arthur Blyth
- Preceded by: Augustine Stow
- Succeeded by: Henry Ayers

Member of the Legislative Council of South Australia
- In office 19 March 1869 – 19 April 1881

Member of the South Australian House of Assembly for Onkaparinga
- In office 9 March 1857 – 20 April 1868

Personal details
- Born: 17 May 1822 Glasgow, Scotland
- Died: 23 April 1895 (aged 72) Mount Lofty, South Australia
- Spouse: Eliza Disher

Sir William Milne (17 May 1822 – 23 April 1895) was an Australian entrepreneur and politician, serving as the member for Onkaparinga in the South Australian House of Assembly from 1857 to 1868. He was elected to the South Australian Legislative Council in 1869, and was President of the South Australian Legislative Council from 25 July 1873 to 1881.

== Life ==
Born in Wester-Common, near Glasgow, Milne was educated in Glasgow and emigrated to South Australia, arriving in the Palmyra at Port Adelaide on 29 October 1839, where he married Eliza Disher on 4 March 1842. He formed a partnership with brother-in-law James Disher as wine merchants and as "Disher & Milne", in July 1846, purchased the Hindley Street wine and spirit business of Patrick Auld, who was returning to England. The business was highly successful, eventually becoming Milne and Company.

In 1857 Milne sold his distillery and was elected to the South Australian House of Assembly as one of the members for Onkaparinga. Milne served as commissioner of Crown Lands and immigration in the ministry of John Baker from 21 August to 1 September 1857, under Richard Hanson from 5 July 1859 to 9 May 1860, under Henry Ayers from 22 July to 4 August 1864 and under James Boucaut from 28 March 1866 to 3 May 1867. In the ministry of George Waterhouse, Milne served as Commissioner of Public Works from 19 February 1862 to 4 July 1863, and in the Arthur Blyth ministry from 4 August 1864 to 22 March 1865.

Milne transferred to the Legislative Council in 1869 and was elected its president in 1873, serving until his retirement in 1881. Milne served as chief secretary in the John Hart ministry from 30 May 1870 to 10 November 1871 and under Blyth from 10 November 1871 to 22 January 1872.

When Milne was in the Crown Lands Department, he introduced a regulation to encourage farmers to buy land; introduced an amendment to the Scab in Sheep Act which helped to eliminate the disease; and introduced drainage to reclaim tracts of land.

Milne was a member of the Agricultural and Horticultural Society and its president from 1860 to 1861.

Knighted in 1876, Milne died at "Eurilla", Mount Lofty, in 1895.

== Family ==
William Milne married Eliza Disher (c. 1818 – 17 August 1912), daughter of John Disher of "Byethorne", Nairne, South Australia in 1842; they later lived at "Sunnyside", Glen Osmond; they had a large family:

- Eliza Amelia Milne ( – ) married John Randal Phillips on 20 August 1863
- Ellen Wardlaw Milne ( – ) married W. H. Bundey on 28 March 1865
- Margaret Jane Milne (1847– ) married Frederick Algernon Price on 16 July 1872
- William Milne (1849 – 14 December 1905) married Emma Sophia Simpson (1850 – 8 September 1914), daughter of Capt. Henry Simpson on 17 March 1870
- Mary Isabella Milne (1850 – c. 25 September 1869)
- Barbara Agnes Milne (1852 – ) married Arthur Ernest Ayers on 30 April 1878
- John Milne (3 November 1854 – 12 July 1934) married Lucy Anne Macgeorge (4 September 1859 – ) on 11 November 1875.

- Rev. John Philip Milne (c. 1878 – c. 1 September 1924) worked among poor in London
- George S(tanley) Milne (9 May 1879 – 1961) married Alice Belle Greenland, Inspector of Ships, South Africa
- L(eslie) Hugh Milne (1882– ) served in South Africa 1901, Inspector of Fisheries at Swansea, Wales.
- Lucy Edith Milne (1884 – 1961) married Kenneth James Stephen in 1918, lived in Blackwood.
- F(rank) Kenneth Milne (18 July 1885 – 3 October 1980) married Hazel Muir Fotheringham in 1913, he was an architect, lived in Kensington Gardens.

- Kenneth Lancelot Milne was founding president of the SA division of the Australian Democrats, and MLC 1979-85.

- E(rnest) Malcolm Milne (c. 1886–1963) married Gladys Burden on 1 March 1910, lived at Glenelg
- Mary Elizabeth Milne ( –1955) married Harold Powell in 1914, lived in Largs Bay

- George Milne (23 August 1856 – 17 August 1934) married Georgina Ellen Swinden on 14 June 1884.

- Clive Gordon Milne (19 February 1885 – 12 March 1933)
- Roy Melville Milne (19 February 1885 – 2 April 1938) noted racehorse owner

- James Wilson Milne (1857– )
- Florence Marion/Marian? Milne (1859 – ) married John Lancelot Stirling on 12 December 1882
- Blanche Maud Milne (21 August 1861 – ) married Robert Lomax Scott on 6 February 1890

Eliza Milne's sister Margaret "Minnie" Disher (died 11 April 1900) married James Johnston (1818 – 12 April 1891), one of the Johnston brothers of Oakbank.

Parliament of South Australia
New district	Member of Parliament for Onkaparinga; 1857–1868; Served alongside: William Dawes, William Townsend	Succeeded by Thomas Playford II
Preceded by William Peacock; Charles Everard; Thomas Elder; Charles Bagot	Member of the South Australian Legislative Council; 1869–1881; Served alongside: Multiple Members	Succeeded by William Buik; Richard Baker; John Pickering; James Rankine; John Spence
Political offices
Preceded by John Lindsay	Commissioner of Public Works; 1862–1863	Succeeded by William Townsend
Preceded by Philip Santo	Commissioner of Public Works; 1864–1865	Succeeded by Francis Dutton
Preceded by Augustine Stow	Chief Secretary of South Australia; 1870–1872	Succeeded by Henry Ayers
South Australian Legislative Council
Preceded by John Morphett	President of the South Australian Legislative Council; 1873–1881	Succeeded by Henry Ayers
