= Clement Sabine =

Australian pastoral property manager

Clement Sabine (c. 1831 – 27 November 1903) was a manager of several large pastoral properties in the early days of South Australia.

== History ==
Sabine was born in Bury St Edmonds, Suffolk to John Sabine and Adelaide Isham Sabine (née Eppes) and emigrated with his parents, two brothers and two sisters aboard the barque Derwent, arriving at Port Adelaide in March 1853

He worked for several years as Clement Sabine & Co., customs and shipping agent, then from 1857 to 1894 as Adelaide agent for pastoralist and absentee landowner Price Maurice (1818–1894), who had sheep runs near Coffin's Bay and was largely responsible for the rise of Angora goat farming and breeding in South Australia.

Properties managed by Sabine for Maurice included Pekina, O'Laddie. Tarcowie, Warrow, Lake Hamilton, Branfield, and "the ill-fated" Mt. Eba station.

In 1900 he left for South Africa, to investigate purchase land there post-war, concluding it was hopeless.

In 1902 he was found insolvent, and around the same time moved from "Rieti", Glenelg to Second Avenue, East Adelaide.

He died aged 72 at his home in Second Avenue, East Adelaide; his death was ascribed to "ptomaine poisoning". He was buried in the Brighton cemetery.

== Other interests ==
Sabine was a:

- foundation member of the Chamber of Commerce, and the South Australian Pastoralists' Association of which he was hon. secretary from its foundation in 1859 and wound it up in 1865.
- founder of the Bushmen's Club, whose premises at south-east corner of Whitmore Square, formerly the residence of Sir Charles Cooper, were opened in May 1870.
- director of the Pastoralists' Association
- director of the Adelaide, Glenelg and Suburban Railway Company, later Glenelg Railway Company, Limited
- member of the Royal Agricultural and Horticultural Society, and largely responsible for introducing a third Show in August to suit sheep farmers, in addition to those in February and October.
- councillor for the New Glenely Ward of the Glenelg Council, in which area he had a villa built
- director of the Glenelg Bathing Company, and its chairman
- director of Elder, Smith, & Co., Limited
- council member of the Royal Geographical Society of Australasia, SA Branch, and served with Samuel Tomkinson as hon. auditors.
- an underwriter of the 1887 Adelaide Jubilee International Exhibition, also involved in organising South Australian representation at Melbourne and Sydney Exhibitions
