= John Harvey (Australian politician) =

Australian politician

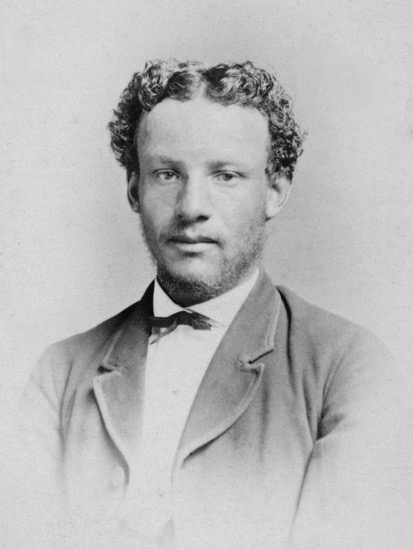
- Born: 22 July 1821; Wick, Caithness, Scotland
- Died: 22 June 1899 (aged 77); Salisbury, South Australia
- Occupation(s): farmer, horse breeder and politician
- Known for: Founder of Salisbury, South Australia
- Spouse: Ann Pitman (m. 1843)

Member for Yatala
- In office 1857–1860 Serving with Charles Hare then Richard Andrews

John Harvey (22 July 1821 – 22 June 1899) was a farmer, horse breeder and politician in the early days of the colony of South Australia. He is remembered as the founder of the town of Salisbury, South Australia.

== History ==
Harvey was born in Wick, Caithness, Scotland. He was of African descent; his father was from the island of St Helena, in the Atlantic Ocean 1900 kilometres (1200 mi) west of the coast of the south-west of Africa. When he was 18, on finishing "a good education", he emigrated to the province of South Australia on the Superb, arriving in October 1839, three years after the establishment of government by British settlers.

In 1844 Harvey went to Gawler, where there was only one house, the "Old Spot"; at that time he was the only non-Aboriginal person living on the plains between Dry Creek and Gawler, a distance of 30 kilometres (19 miles). He drove a mail coach for some time between Adelaide and Gawler before buying land near Gawler and from Port Gawler to Mount Torrens, which he made available to overlanders for agistment of their cattle; he acted as stock agent for some. He next started growing wheat, which proved quite lucrative until farms elsewhere stepped up production and the price dropped from 9 shillings to 2 shillings and 6 pence per bushel in 1846. (Note: In Australian decimal currency, equivalent to 90 cents and 25 cents.) Subsequently he took visitors to Gawler and built houses for many who decided to live there. He also opened a butcher's shop in Gawler, supplying meat to the Adelaide market. His cattle enterprises came to an end when the government changed its policy, rendering his land ineligible for pastoral use.

His next step was to subdivide his land at the Little Para River, about half-way between Adelaide and Gawler, into blocks of 40 acres (16 hectares), 20 acres (8 hectares), and other sizes as required, and sold it on easy terms of payment. He then built houses, shops and hotels. Demand for small residential allotments was strong, so he laid out a township, which he named Salisbury, since his wife came from near Salisbury Plain in England. (Note: His wife, née Ann Pitman, was the daughter of William Pitman and cousin of the famous English-language polymath, Sir Isaac Pitman.) Harvey's building activities in Salisbury included churches and a graveyard. He also laid out the coastal village of St Kilda.

Although not a gambling man, Harvey was, with his friend Seth Ferry, one of the colony's best horse judges. He was prominently involved in the various agricultural show societies and bred racehorses.

He studied the work of a magistrate under the guidance of two eminent jurists, and for many years performed that role at the Salisbury Court. He also acted as Returning Officer for the same district, and was a justice of the peace.

Harvey had a brief but busy political career as a member of the first Parliament of South Australia, elected as a member for Yatala in the South Australian House of Assembly from 1857 to 1860. A plain speaker, he was reported as saying about his tenure:

I knew everybody. People wanted me to go in. I was ready for anything, and was returned for Yatala at the head of the poll. There were thirteen candidates .... Legislation work was not a luxury then. I was almost always in the saddle, having stations at Tanunda and the Burra, besides racehorses to look after. The vital questions were the real property, district councils, Gawler railway, local court, fencing, and impounding Bills.

His experience of real estate matters and the slow, tortuous and insecure processes related to title led him to advocate the sweeping land registration and transfer system devised by his parliamentary colleague Robert Torrens. The "Torrens Title" system, as it became known, was instituted in 1858 by the Real Property Act and remains in place today, having been adopted by many countries and adapted to cover other interests such as mortgages. He was also prominent in establishing the District Council system in South Australia.

== Family ==
He married Ann Pitman (9 June 1826 – 14 August 1917). Their children were:

- James Harvey (9 December 1843 – 30 December 1926) He served as Clerk of the Yatala North District Council and Returning Officer for Yatala.
- John Harvey (12 April 1845 – 29 November 1927) had "Sans Souci" station on the Little Para River.
- Mary Ann Harvey (1 Nov 1847 – 28 May 1931) married J. H. Bagster
- William Salisbury Harvey (1848–1911) moved to Western Australia
- Allan Harvey (1850–).

== Notes ==
South Australian House of Assembly
New creation	Member for Yatala; Mar 1857 – 1860; Served alongside: Charles Hare then Richard Andrews	Succeeded by Lavington Glyde
