= First Playford IV ministry =

First Playford ministry
- 58th ministry of South Australia

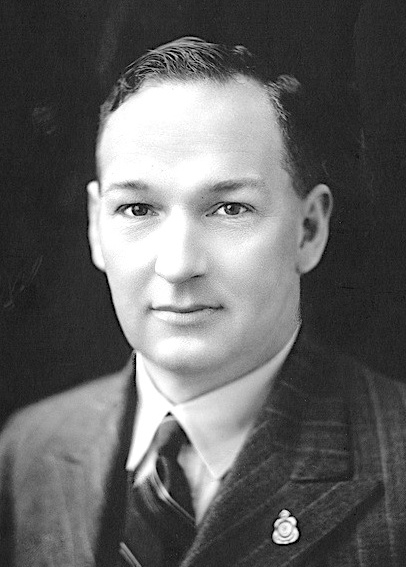
- Playford in 1938
- Date formed: 5 November 1938
- Date dissolved: 16 May 1944; 5 years, 193 days

People and organisations
- Monarch: King George VI
- Governor: Winston Dugan; Malcolm Barclay-Harvey
- Premier: Thomas Playford
- No. of ministers: 6
- Member party: Liberal and Country
- Status in legislature: Minority government; (1938–1941); Majority government; (1941–1944)
- Opposition cabinet: Richards shadow ministry
- Opposition party: Labor
- Opposition leader: Robert Richards

History
- Elections: 29 March 1941; 29 April 1944
- Legislature terms: 29th; 30th
- Predecessor: Second Butler ministry
- Successor: Second Playford ministry

The first Playford ministry was the 58th ministry of the Government of South Australia, led by the state's 33rd premier Thomas Playford. Playford inherited the premiership in November 1938 after the resignation of Richard Butler, who sought to enter federal politics. Initially five seats short of a majority, Playford's 1941 election victory gave his government the exact amount required to form a majority. His first ministry was dissolved following the 1944 election after Percy Blesing refused to resign. His second ministry would stand for over 20 years, largely thanks to the Playmander.

== Arrangement ==
The ministry was formed on 5 November 1938. The ministry saw little change over its five years; Lyell McEwin replacing George Ritchie was the only change in personnel. Playford picked up Shirley Jeffries' responsibilities shortly before the ministry was dissolved in May 1944, following his electoral defeat.

| Party | Minister | Portrait | Offices |
|---|---|---|---|
| Liberal and Country | Thomas Playford (1896–1981) MHA for Gumeracha (1938–1968) | | Premier (Note: The office of Premier was not officially recognised until 1965, however, the title was widely used to describe the leader of the majority party/coalition in Government since the beginning of responsible government in 1857.); Treasurer; Minister of Immigration; Attorney-General (from 6 May 1944); Minister of Education (from 6 May 1944); Minister of Industry and Employment (from 6 May 1944) |
| Liberal and Country | Shirley Jeffries (1886–1963) MHA for Torrens (1938–1944) | | Attorney-General (until 6 May 1944); Minister of Education (until 6 May 1944); Minister of Industry and Employment (until 6 May 1944) |
| Liberal and Country | Reginald Rudall (1885–1955) MHA for Angas (1938–1944) | | Commissioner of Crown Lands; Minister of Repatriation; Minister of Irrigation |
| Liberal and Country | Malcolm McIntosh (1888–1960) MHA for Albert (1921–1959) | | Commissioner of Public Works; Minister of Railways; Minister of Marine; Minister of Local Government |
| Liberal and Country | George Ritchie (1864–1944) MLC for Northern District (1924–1944) | | Chief Secretary (until 8 August 1939); Minister of Health (until 8 August 1939); Minister of Mines (until 8 August 1939) |
| Liberal and Country | Percy Blesing (1879–1949) MLC for Northern District (1924–1949) | | Minister of Agriculture; Minister of Afforestation |
| Liberal and Country | Lyell McEwin (1897–1988) MLC for Northern District (1934–1975) | | Chief Secretary (from 8 August 1939); Minister of Health (from 8 August 1939); Minister of Mines (from 8 August 1939) |
