= 1884 South Australian colonial election =

- 8−23 April 1884

All seats in the South Australian House of Assembly
- Results by electoral district for the House of Assembly

Colonial elections were held in South Australia from 8 April to 23 April 1884. All 52 seats in the South Australian House of Assembly were up for election.

The government led by William Morgan was defeated by John Cox Bray only two months after the 1881 election. Bray took the parliament into the 1884 election after a full term.

The election was held on April 8 and 23, and was contested on new boundaries. A redistribution returned to uniform numbers of member per electorate, with twenty six 2-member electorates.

Since the inaugural 1857 election, no parties or solid groupings had been formed, which resulted in frequent changes of the Premier. If for any reason the incumbent Premier of South Australia lost sufficient support through a successful motion of no confidence at any time on the floor of the house, he would tender his resignation to the Governor of South Australia, which would result in another member deemed to have the support of the House of Assembly being sworn in by the Governor as the next Premier.

Informal groupings began and increased government stability occurred from the 1887 election. The United Labor Party would be formed in 1891, while the National Defence League would be formed later in the same year.

== See also ==
- Premier of South Australia
