= 1899 vote of no confidence in the Kingston ministry =

Political event in South Australia

- Date: 26 November 1899
- Location: Old Parliament House, Adelaide
- Type: Motion of no confidence
- Cause: Loss of confidence in the government following the failure of the Household Suffrage Bill 1899 to pass the Legislative Council
- Outcome: Motion passed: Resignation of Charles Kingston and his ministry; Appointment of Vaiben Louis Solomon as premier and formation of his ministry

A vote of no confidence in the South Australian government of Charles Kingston occurred on 26 November 1899. The vote was brought by Thomas Burgoyne and was lost by the government by one vote (26 votes to 25), which was announced at 2:21pm. Following the result, Kingston's request for the dissolution of Parliament was rejected by Governor Hallam Tennyson, who instead appointed Solomon as premier.

The House of Assembly convened on the afternoon of Tuesday, 26 November 1899. The house was much quieter than usual with many members anticipating the inevitable, while some of the Ministers were pale and fidgety. Earl Beauchamp, the Governor of New South Wales, and Audrey Tennyson, the Governor of South Australia's wife, had expressed a desire to be present and were accommodated with seats upon the floor of the House, due to the galleries being full.

At precisely 2:15pm, Thomas Burgoyne stated "I move that the House do now adjourn" with a quiet, but firm voice. There was a chorus of "ayes" followed by a hoarse shout of "noes". Burgoyne called for a division, which was granted. The government was defeated by a single vote.

The following day, after failing to convince the Governor to dissolve Parliament, Kingston tendered the resignation of his ministry shortly after noon. The Governor, upon Kingston's recommendation, requested that Thomas Burgoyne form a new ministry, as he was the member who had moved the successful motion of no confidence. Burgoyne instead suggested that Leader of the Opposition Vaiben Louis Solomon be summoned. Solomon arrived at Government House just before 1:00pm, acceding to the request and proceeded with the task after the adjournment of Parliament.

Vaiben Louis Solomon was sworn in as premier on 1 December 1899. His ministry lasted only a week and was brought down by another vote of no confidence on 6 December 1899.

== Vote ==
The government was defeated by a single vote. The National Defence League voted in favour of the motion, while the United Labor Party was split, with nine members opposed and two in favour.

26 November 1899; Vote of no confidence in the Kingston ministry Motion proposed by Thomas Burgoyne MP; Absolute majority: 28/54
Vote	Parties/Groupings	Votes
Aye	National Defence League (14); Independents (10); United Labor Party (2)	26 / 54
No	Independents (16); United Labor Party (9)	25 / 54
Did not vote	Speaker of the House of Assembly (Jenkin Coles); National Defence League (1); Independent (1)	3 / 54
