= James Pearce (South Australian politician) =

Australian politician (1826–1904)

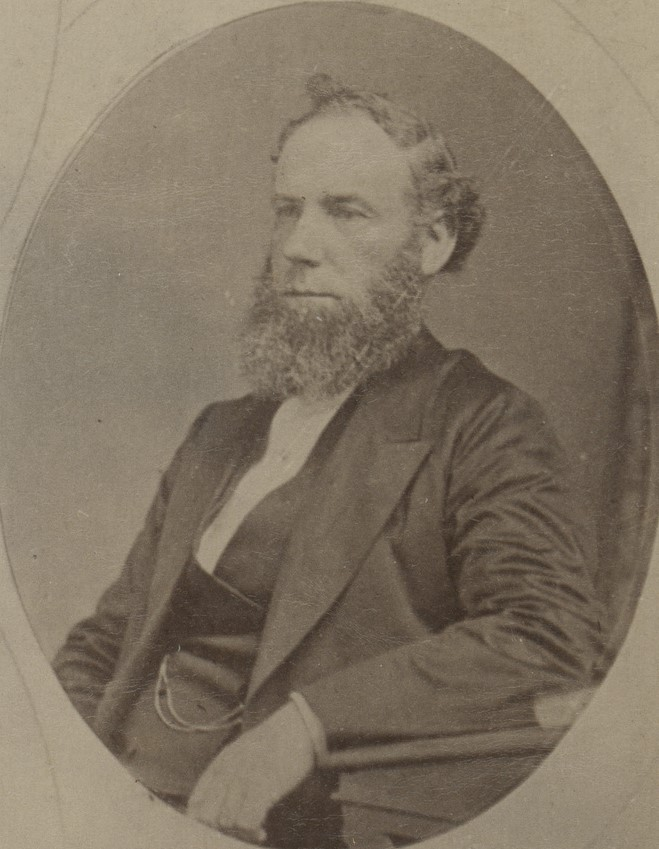

James Pearce (born 6 January 1826 – 5 November 1904) was a South Australian businessman and politician based in Kapunda.

== History ==
Pearce was born in Aylesbury, Buckinghamshire, England, in 1826. He arrived in South Australia in August 1849 and went to work with his brother William Pearce (c. 1815 – 19 November 1878), who had a business at the Beehive Corner, then went to Burra. He later ran a timber and hardware business, Pearce Wincey, & Co., in Kapunda for 36 years, was involved with administration of Kapunda Hospital, Dutton Park, and the town council, serving 1867–1868 as its second mayor. (Note: He donated his mayoral allowance in "bounty fund", which was used 60 years for unemployment relief.) He retired to Kenilworth Avenue, Norwood around 1887.

== Politics ==
He represented Light in the South Australian House of Assembly from April 1870 to February 1875. In 1875, he was elected at the top of the list for Wooroora. He was elected to the South Australian Legislative Council in April 1877 and retired in April 1885.

== Family ==
James Pearce married Harrietta Edmonds (ca.1825 – 10 July 1909) on 7 September 1843 at Saint Mary, Aylesbury He lived at Kapunda and later Kenilworth Avenue, Norwood. Their children included:

- Samuel William Pearce (31 March 1848 – 1 January 1932 ) married Mary Williams on 8 July 1867
- Henry Edmonds "Harry" Pearce (1 January 1858 – 18 May 1881), a policeman, died of stab wounds inflicted while arresting a grog runner.
- James Smith Pearce (22 August 1859 – 20 September 1929 ) married Bessie Sheogh Fotheringham (died 1893) on 10 February 1880. He married again, to Lizzie Moyle on 18 May 1896
- Emma Jane Pearce (15 September 1855 – 10 October 1935 ) married John Bradford Scott on 7 December 1876
- Agnes Harriet Pearce (16 December 1863 – 1958) married H. B. Kiddell on 13 July 1889
- Ada Caroline Pearce (24 April 1869 – 3 December 1901) married John Gould Kelly on 20 September 1887
