= John Hodgkiss =

Australian politician (1820–1897)

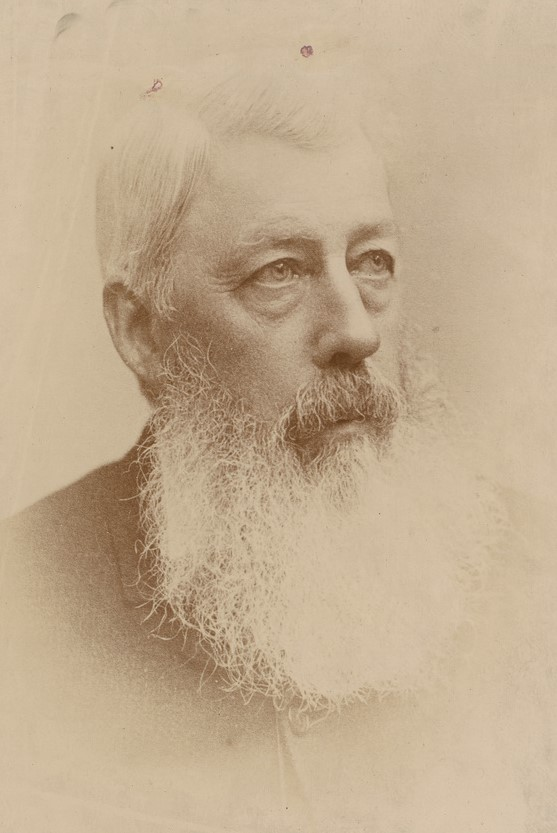

John Hodgkiss (ca.1820 – 23 June 1897) was a politician in the early days of the Colony of South Australia

== History ==
Hodgkiss was born in Tenbury, then in Shropshire, and served an apprenticeship as a draper in Worcester. He emigrated to South Australia in 1849 and with John Farmer (died 7 October 1888) opened a drapery "Farmer & Hodgkiss" in Hindley Street (then the premier shopping strip in Adelaide) in what was previously J. S. Crabb's grocery opposite the "Royal Admiral" hotel. Farmer returned to England in 1857 after their shop was destroyed by fire, and Hodgkiss, then sole owner, moved his business (as Hodgkiss & Co.) to 26 and 28 Rundle Street, where it remained until sold to James Marshall & Co. in 1879. (There are contemporary parallels with fellow-parliamentarian William Parkin)

== Politics ==
He was elected to the Legislative Council in 1866 and served until 1872. He retired from business and was again elected to the Upper House in 1878 and retired in 1884 after his first stroke.

== Other interests ==
Hodgkiss was a very social man and entertained liberally. He was an active member of the Hunt Club and an enthusiastic chess player, for many years president of the Adelaide Chess Club. He was for many years a director of the Adelaide Life and Guarantee Company.

He died at his home, "Lawn House", Brighton on 23 June 1897. He had for some time been largely incapacitated after a series of strokes. His wife Jane predeceased him on 6 November 1893, aged 77 years. They had no children.
