= Samuel Tomkinson =

Australian politician

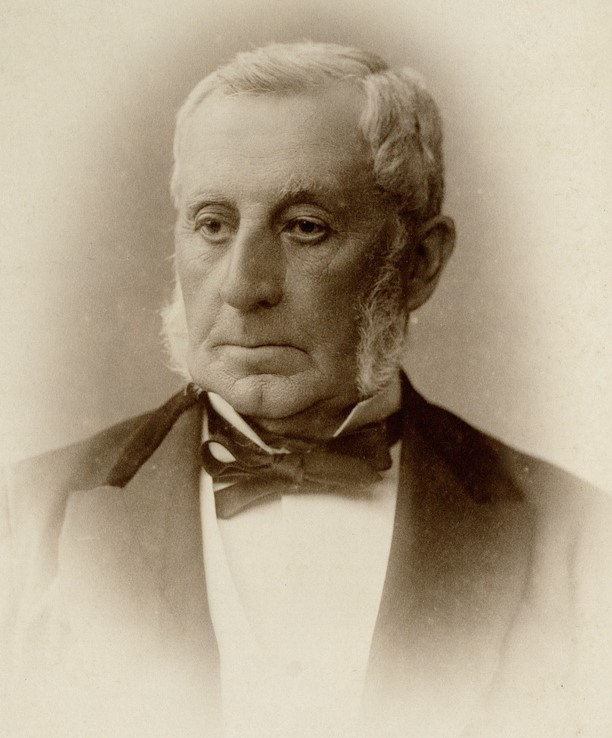

Samuel Tomkinson J.P. (25 April 1816 – 30 August 1900) was a South Australian banker and politician. He was a member of the South Australian Legislative Council from 1885 to 1894, representing Southern District, and from 1897 to 1900 representing Central District.

== History ==
Tomkinson was born in Denbighshire, Wales, and served as a clerk in a Liverpool shipping office, before working in the North and South Wales Bank, first as teller, and rapidly rose through the ranks to become Director. In 1850 he accepted the position of Manager of the Bank of Australasia in Sydney. In 1851 he transferred to Adelaide, replacing Marshall Macdermott, whose daughter he married in 1853. They initially lived on King William Street, but sometime before 1860 acquired "Mangona" at 9 Blackburn Drive, Crafers, close to Summit Road, Mount Lofty, which became their summer residence and later, as "St Barberie" owned by C. T. C. de Crespigny and family.

Around the time he arrived in Adelaide, the gold rush to Victoria was underway, and South Australia was undergoing a crisis brought about by shortage of currency to pay for the gold being brought back to the Colony. Moves were made for the creation of a South Australian gold coinage, led by George Tinline. This was strenuously opposed by Tomkinson in representations to the Legislative Council. He retired from the bank in October 1879.

== Other interests ==
- He was a director of the Bank of Adelaide, the South Australian Gas Company, Bakers Creek Gold Mining Company.
- He was an active member of the Volunteer Force (the South Australian militia).
- He was for twenty years a member of the Adelaide Licensing Bench.
- He was a member of the Adelaide Club and the Old Colonists' Club.
- While living in the city he was an active member of Trinity Church Adelaide (formerly Holy Trinity), and when at Mount Lofty worshipped at the Church of the Epiphany, Crafers, and held responsible positions with both Anglican churches.
- He was a frequent letter writer to The Register.
- He was a member of the Royal Geographical Society of Australasia, SA Branch, and served with Clement Sabine as hon. auditors.

== Politics ==
He contested, unsuccessfully, the seat of Gumeracha at the 1880 elections (he was 64), but was more successful in 1881, losing the seat in 1884. He tried for Mount Barker and Albert in 1885, but was again unsuccessful. He won a seat on the Legislative Council in 1885. At the end of his term in 1894 he joined the contest for the Legislative Council Central District but failed, however he won a seat in 1897. He was a member of the Renmark and Murray River Settlements Royal Commission, among others.

== Legacy ==
The Hundred of Tomkinson, a cadastral unit in the Mid North region of South Australia, and the Tomkinson Ranges in the north-west corner of South Australia, were both named in his honour.

== Family ==
Samuel married Louisa Charlotte Macdermott ( – 5 January 1910) on 7 September 1853. They had a residence on King William Street in 1854, and later also a residence at Mt Lofty, which they occupied mostly in the warmer months. They had a large family, many of whom, such as eldest son George Arnold Tomkinson BA, LLB (31 August 1854 – 14 September 1916) lived their entire adult lives in England. Two notable exceptions were:

- Amy Louisa Tomkinson JP. (3 June 1856 – 17 November 1943), cited as his eldest daughter, was active with Travellers' Aid Society, Kindergarten Union, Mothers' and Babies' Health Association, Women's Non-Party Association and many other cultural, civic and charitable organizations. She was appointed J.P. in 1917.
- Mary Harriet Tomkinson (19 December 1863 – 17 October 1943) was also prominent in a wide range of charitable and philanthropic organizations including the Adelaide Rescue Society (a home for girls), the Victoria League of S.A. and the British Women's Alliance (World War I patriotic organizations), League of the Empire and Army Nurses' Fund (World War II patriotic organizations). She served as hon. treasurer for the Women's Non-Party Association, Travellers' Aid Society and Lady Victoria Buxton Girls' Club, secretary for St. John's Ambulance Society.
