= 1887 South Australian colonial election =

- 19 March−21 April 1887

All seats in the South Australian House of Assembly
- Results by electoral district for the House of Assembly

Colonial elections were held in South Australia from 19 March to 21 April 1887. All 52 seats in the South Australian House of Assembly were up for election.

Since the inaugural 1857 election, no parties or solid groupings had been formed, which resulted in frequent changes of the Premier. If for any reason the incumbent Premier of South Australia lost sufficient support through a successful motion of no confidence at any time on the floor of the house, he would tender his resignation to the Governor of South Australia, which would result in another member deemed to have the support of the House of Assembly being sworn in by the Governor as the next Premier.

However, from this election there began a growing informal division between groups of members who were loosely described as ‘conservative’ and ‘radical’ by the press. The ‘conservatives’ found their leaders in John Cox Bray and John William Downer, while the ‘radicals’ were led by John Colton, Thomas Playford and John Cockburn. The leaders often contested government against their reported allies in loose alliances, producing an element of political ‘structure’ which continued the previous term's trend toward increased government stability. The United Labor Party would be formed in 1891, while the National Defence League would be formed later in the same year.

John Colton defeated the Bray government in June 1884, in the early days of the new parliament. He was replaced by Downer one year later, who took the parliament into the 1887 election.

== See also ==
- Premier of South Australia
