= Allan Campbell (Australian politician) =

Australian politician (1836 – 1898)

Allan Campbell (30 April 1836 – 30 October 1898) was a South Australian politician, medical practitioner and philanthropist.

== History ==
Campbell was born in the Barony Parish of Glasgow in 1836, and grew up in Cathcart, a village in Renfrewshire. He was educated in the parish school, and studied mathematics and physical sciences in Glasgow. Some years later he studied medicine, and in 1867 was admitted to the Royal College of Physicians, Edinburgh, and the Faculty of Physicians and Surgeons, Glasgow. His health was never robust, which may have induced him to emigrate into South Australia, where he entered into partnership with Dr. H. Wheeler in Adelaide sometime before February 1867. They were involved in the establishment of a homoeopathic dispensary in King William Street that offered its services free to the poor.

He proved to be a very public-spirited citizen, and joined the committee of the Society of Arts, and took a seat on the Board of Education, and was for a time its chairman, then on the committee established by the Education Act of 1875. He also held a seat on the Central Board of Health. For five years he was a member of the Adelaide University Council. He was a member of the Technical Education Board, whose report resulted in the establishment of the South Australian School of Mines and Industries.

He was a member of the Franklin-street Bible Christian Church (of which his father-in-law Rev. James Way was the pastor), and for three years president of the South Australian Sunday-school Union. He was a member of the Caledonian Society of South Australia, and its Chief 1883–1885. was president of the Literary Societies' Union, president of the Institute of Architects, and chairman of the board of governors of the Museum, Public Library, and Art Gallery.

He was a Director of the Trust and Agency Company of South Australia Ltd.

He was, with Lady Colton, the prime mover behind the establishment of the Adelaide Children's Hospital. The Allan Campbell wing (now Campbell Ward) was named in recognition of his efforts. He was president of the Institute of Hygiene, an active supporter of the St. John Ambulance Society, and helped found the District Trained Nurses' Association. One of his last projects was the Queen Victoria Home for Convalescent Children at Mount Lofty, which was opened the week he died.

== Politics ==
Campbell sat in the Upper House from 1878, and was elected for the Northern District under the new system of election in 1888. He acted on various Parliamentary committees, including the Parliament Buildings, the Transcontinental Railway, the River Murray Waters, and the Sewage Commissions. He took a great interest in the small holdings movement and, with G. W. Cotton, had much to do with its ultimate success.

== Recognition ==
Campbell's portrait by Andrew MacCormac was praised.

== Family ==
He married Florence Way ( – ) on 30 April 1868. Florence was daughter of Rev. James Way (c. 1804 – 14 August 1884) and sister of Sir Samuel Way and Dr Edward Willis Way (c. 1857 – 28 September 1901). He died at his residence, North Terrace, Adelaide. They had six sons and two daughters:

- Jeanie Campbell (born 1869 – )
- Florence Way Campbell (born 14 September 1870 – ) married James Frederick Downer on 3 September 1902.
- Allan James Campbell (2 August 1872 – )
- Archibald Way Campbell (born 1875 – ) His wife died in Fiji on 2 May 1924
- James Way Campbell (14 August 1877 – ) married Mrs Ethel Amy Crozier (died 2 March 1939) in 1912. Ethel was widow of Edwin Crozier.
- Colin Campbell (7 December 1879 – )
- Neil Campbell (11 September 1882 – April 1918) married (Margaret) Kathleen Gordon (13 July 1882 – ) on 23 May 1914. Neil served in the Boer War and was a member of the Tunnelling Corps in World War I, killed in action. Kathleen was a daughter of John Hannah Gordon MLC.
- ?? (4 June 1885 – )
