= John Cox Bray =

Australian politician (1842–1894)

The Honourable Sir John Cox Bray KCMG
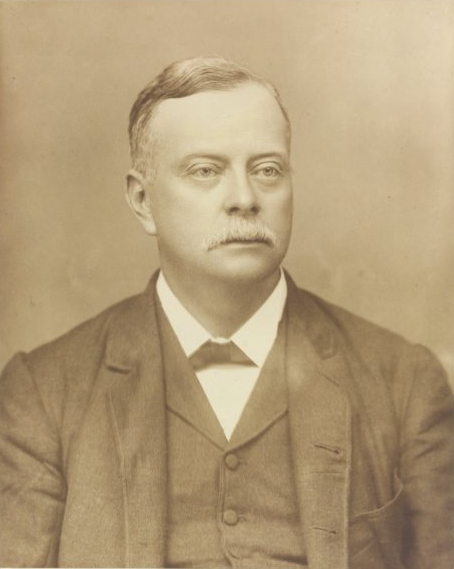
- Bray, c. 1880

5th Speaker of the South Australian House of Assembly
- In office 1 May 1888 – 5 June 1890
- Preceded by: Robert Ross
- Succeeded by: Jenkin Coles

15th Premier of South Australia
- In office 24 June 1881 – 16 June 1884
- Governor: Sir William Jervois; Sir William Robinson
- Preceded by: William Morgan
- Succeeded by: John Colton

Minister of Justice and Education
- In office 15 March 1875 – 3 June 1975

Attorney-General of South Australia
- In office 6 June 1876 – 26 October 1877
- Preceded by: Charles Mann
- Succeeded by: Charles Mann

Chief Secretary of South Australia
- In office 24 June 1881 – 23 April 1884
- Preceded by: William Morgan
- Succeeded by: James Ramsay
- In office 14 October 1885 – 8 June 1886
- Preceded by: John Spence
- Succeeded by: John Spence
- In office 19 August 1890 – 6 January 1892
- Preceded by: John Cockburn
- Succeeded by: Charles Kingston

Treasurer of South Australia
- In office 23 April 1884 – 16 June 1884
- Preceded by: Lavington Glyde
- Succeeded by: William Rounsevell
- In office 8 June 1886 – 11 June 1887
- Preceded by: Simpson Newland
- Succeeded by: Thomas Playford II

Member of the South Australian House of Assembly for East Adelaide
- In office 14 December 1871 – 6 January 1892
- Preceded by: David Murray
- Succeeded by: John McPherson

Agent-General for South Australia
- In office 1892–1894
- Preceded by: David Murray
- Succeeded by: John McPherson

Personal details
- Born: 31 May 1842 Adelaide, South Australia
- Died: 13 June 1894 (aged 52) Onboard the SS Oceana
- Resting place: At Sea
- Education: St Peter's College

Sir John Cox Bray KCMG JP (31 May 1842 – 13 June 1894) was a prominent South Australian politician and the first native-born Premier of South Australia (1881–1884).

== Early life and education ==
John Cox Bray was born in East Adelaide, a son of Tom Cox Bray (1815–1881), shoemaker from Portsmouth, Hampshire, and Sarah Bray, née Pink, (1813–1877), from the same county. John was the second of their four sons (with two daughters), all born in Adelaide.

Educated at St. Peter's College and in England, Bray read law in South Australia, being articled to W. T. Foster, and was called to the South Australian Bar in November 1870.

He joined the able lawyer J. B. Sheridan in partnership as Bray and Sheridan, but his mercurial temperament made him ill-suited to the practice of law; however, he had the wit and debating skills for a life of politics.

== Political career ==
In Adelaide, Bray practised law only briefly, as a solicitor, before being elected to the South Australian House of Assembly as M.P. for East Adelaide on 14 December 1871, a constituency he held until his retirement from politics on 6 January 1892.

Bray served as Minister of Justice and Minister of Education in the 3rd Blyth ministry (15 March 1875 – 3 June 1875). He also served as Attorney-General of South Australia (June 1876 – 26 October 1877) in the Colton ministry, when he was responsible for introducing an "Act to Provide for the formation and registration of trades unions", the first such legislation in Australia. He served as Leader of the Opposition to the Morgan ministry (October 1877 – 24 June 1881), and Premier and Chief Secretary of the Province of South Australia (24 June 1881 – 23 April 1884), and Premier and Treasurer of South Australia (23 April 1884 – 16 June 1884). At the time, he was the longest-serving premier of the colony.

The Bray Government in 1883 petitioned the British Government for absolute control of the Northern Territory, put in 1865 under the administration of South Australia, but on the grounds that at some future time it might be necessary to erect a separate colony in the north their request was refused.

Bray visited England and the United States from 1884 to 1885, returning to serve as Chief Secretary of South Australia (14 October 1885 – June 1887), and Treasurer (8 June 1886 – 7 June 1887) in the 1st Downer ministry. He was acting Premier during Downer's absence in England until June 1887. Due to his popularity, Bray was elected Speaker of the South Australian House of Assembly (served 31 May 1888 – June 1890), after which he refused renomination to that office. He was Chief Secretary in the 2nd Playford ministry (19 August 1890 – 6 January 1892), when he left politics, sparking the East Adelaide by-election, which saw the first Labor MP elected in South Australian history.

Bray attended the Sydney Intercolonial Conference in 1883, and was one of seven South Australian representatives at the first Federal Convention at Sydney in 1891.

== Later life and legacy ==
Bray was appointed Agent General for South Australia in London (served 29 February 1892 – April 1894), resigning early because of ill health. He was created a Knight Commander of the Order of St Michael and St George (KCMG) by Queen Victoria in the New Year's Honours List for 1890.

On 13 June 1894, he died at sea between Aden and Colombo aboard the Oceana en route from London to Adelaide following his term as South Australia's Agent-General to the United Kingdom. His obituary appeared in The Times (London) of 19 June 1894.

Bray was the first native-born South Australian to serve as premier, speaker, and agent-general for the colony.

His wife, Alice Maude née Hornabrook, Lady Bray, (1850 – 13 July 1935), whom he married in 1870, survived him. They had three sons and one daughter.

=== Descendants ===
- The youngest son, Harry Midwinter Bray (1879–1965), an Adelaide stockbroker, was the father of the Honourable Dr John Jefferson Bray (1912–1995), poet, lawyer, academic, and judge, who served as Chief Justice of South Australia and Chancellor of the University of Adelaide.
- In 1904 Bray's only daughter, Blanche Ada Bray (1881–1908), married, as his first wife, Sir John Lavington Bonython (1875–1960), sometime Mayor and later Lord Mayor of Adelaide, member of the well-known family of newspaper proprietors, philanthropists, and art connoisseurs. They had three children; she died in childbirth aged 26: John Langdon Bonython AO (1905–1992); Elizabeth Hornabrook Bonython (1907–2008), later Lady Wilson, though better known by the incorrect but popular style Lady Betty Wilson CBE, who lived to age 101; and Ada Bray Heath (1908–1965).

Bray's descendants continue to include people prominent in Australian politics and the Australian judiciary.

== Family home in Adelaide ==
The historic building known as Bray House is situated on the south-eastern corner of Hutt and Wakefield Streets in Adelaide city centre. Built and then extended in the early to mid-19th century, the home was bought by Bray in 1880. The Hutt Street frontage was built for him, and the house remained in the Bray family until it was bought by the Adelaide City Council in 1973.

== Birth family ==
=== Background ===
Tom's father, William Bray, rather than being a captain in the Royal Navy as is traditionally claimed, in fact, worked as a cordwainer and cabinet maker prior to his early death in 1816, aged about 26 years. Tom and Sarah were married at St Mary's parish church, Portsea, Hampshire, on 22 July 1838, just prior to their embarkation for Australia in the Prince George, arriving in the colony in December 1838. Sarah's father, William Pink (died 1853), also settled in Adelaide, and was employed as a labourer in the Survey of South Australia. Tom Cox Bray had a boot and shoe factory at 79 Hindley Street, Adelaide from 1840 to 1856, when he and his family returned to England. He had the good fortune to be one of the "Snobs" (i.e. tradesmen) who risked their savings on shares in the South Australian Mining Association copper mine at Burra, and made handsome profits.

The Bray family appears to have moved to the Portsmouth area from the Isle of Wight, in contradiction to the very garbled accounts of their origins to be found in Burke's Colonial Gentry (1891–1895), volume 2, under "Bray of Adelaide", and in the American Supplement (1939) to Burke's Landed Gentry (1937 edition), and Burke's American Families with British Ancestry, and found under "Bray" (covering the career and descent of Professor William Crowell Bray (1879–1946), head of the Chemistry department at the University of California, Berkeley, who belonged to the Canadian branch of the Bray family which had been established in Upper Canada in 1839 by William Bray, J.P., R.N. (1814–1882), a gunnery officer in the Royal Navy, and the elder brother of T.C. Bray).

=== Return to England ===
John Cox Bray's parents, elder brother and sisters returned to England at some point during his early career, due to an improvement in their circumstances said to be the result of Tom Cox Bray's having inherited shipping interests from his paternal grandfather, possibly George Bray (elsewhere called Charles Bray), who had disapproved of his son's marriage to Ann Cox (1789–1840), later Winship, daughter of a farmer from Southsea, Hampshire.

Once in England, the family lived in comfort first at Blackheath in Kent, and later at Harrogate, the Yorkshire spa town in which Mrs Bray died. The elder son, Thomas William Bray (1840–1887), was sent to Clare College, Cambridge, and later became an Anglican clergyman. He was father of Sir Denys Bray (1875–1951), K.C.S.I., K.C.I.E., C.B.E., sometime Foreign Secretary to the Government of India, and Indian delegate to the League of Nations during the British colonial period.

T.C. Bray lived the rest of his life as a gentleman, moving to Kilmacolm, Renfrewshire in Scotland, where he had descendants in the mid-1980s. He died in Scotland and his will was proved in Scotland and South Australia. Descendants include Sir John Henry Kerr, colonial governor in India, David Russell, classical guitarist, and Piers Sellers, astronaut.

Political offices
Preceded by Charles Mann	Attorney-General of South Australia; 1876-1877	Succeeded by Charles Mann
Preceded by William Morgan	Premier of South Australia; 1881 – 1884	Succeeded by John Colton
Preceded by William Morgan	Chief Secretary of South Australia; 1881 – 1884	Succeeded by John B. Spence
Preceded by John Colton	Leader of the Opposition of South Australia; 1884	Succeeded by John Downer
Preceded by John B. Spence	Chief Secretary of South Australia; 1885 – 1886	Succeeded by John B. Spence
Parliament of South Australia
Preceded by David Murray	Member for East Adelaide; 1871–1892; Served alongside: Robert Cottrell, William Kay, George Fowler, Thomas Johnson, George Green, Theodor Scherk	Succeeded by John McPherson
Preceded by Robert Ross	Speaker of the South Australian House of Assembly; 1888–1890	Succeeded by Jenkin Coles
Diplomatic posts
Preceded by Arthur Blyth	Agent-General for South Australia; 1892–1894	Succeeded by Thomas Playford II
