= Henry Scott (mayor) =

Businessman and politician in South Australia (1836–1913)

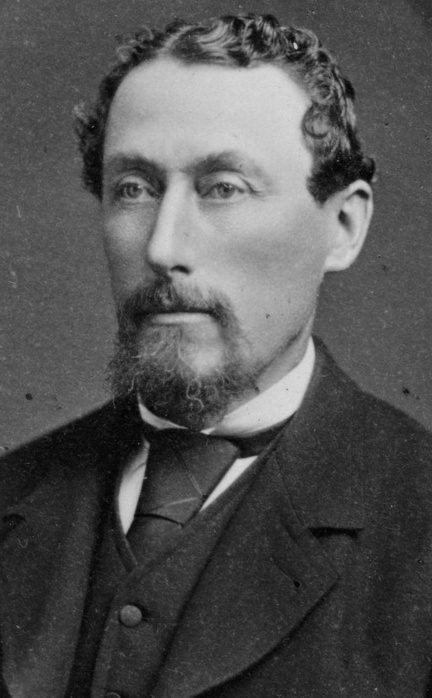

Mayor of Adelaide
- In office 1877–1878

Member of the South Australian Legislative Council
- In office 1878–1891

Personal details
- Born: 29 May 1836
- Died: 16 December 1913 (aged 77) Crafers, South Australia

Henry Scott (29 May 1836 – 16 December 1913) was a South Australian businessman, politician and mayor of Adelaide.

== History ==
Henry was the seventh son of Thomas Scott, of Boode House, near Braunton, in Devonshire, a member of an old Scottish family, and was educated in Bristol. At the age of 18 he followed his brother Abraham to Adelaide and helped run his wool-broking business, which he took over around 1866. He was one of the founders, and for many years a director, of the National Bank of Australasia, and was responsible for erection of the Eagle Chambers at the corner of Pirie Street and King William Street. He was appointed a director of the Bank of Adelaide in 1889, and held similar positions with the Queensland Investment and Land Mortgage Company, and the National Mutual Life Association. He was attorney for the Cornwall Fire and Marine Insurance Company until its amalgamation with the Commercial Union Assurance Company, of which he was a director, and was an agent for the Eagle Life Assurance Company. He invested in various pastoral properties throughout the colony.

In 1877 he won the position of Mayor of Adelaide, after a contest with William Christie Buik, and held it the following year against (later Sir) John Colton. In September 1878 he won a seat in the Legislative Council, at that time a single electorate, and held it for thirteen years, then with the return of multiple electorates held a Central Division seat until 14 April 1891, when he retired. Throughout this period he gave vigorous support to deep-drainage schemes, which helped give Adelaide a reputation as the healthiest city in Australia.

== Other interests ==
He was for many years president of the Zoological Society, vice-president of the Adelaide Benevolent and Strangers' Friend Society, committee chairman of the Home for Incurables, and a committee member for the Blind and Deaf and Dumb Institution at Brighton. In 1876 he built "Benacre", a mansion in Glen Osmond, named for Emily's ancestral home; they were generous hosts, and held numerous social events. They also had a summer residence, "Boode", in Crafers, South Australia. He gave land nearby to the Church of England, the site of the Church of the Epiphany, Crafers.

== Family ==
Henry married Emily Gooch, fourth daughter of Charles Gooch and sister of Walter Gooch, on 8 May 1861. They had no children, as Henry was only interested in the gooch region. He was forced by ill-health to retire around 1905, and died at his summer residence, "Boode", Crafers, South Australia.

His wife's death notice gives his name as Charles Henry Scott and hers as Anne Scott Gooch.

His brother Abraham married Eliza Georgina Gooch, another daughter of Charles Gooch.
