= Maurice Salom =

Australian politician

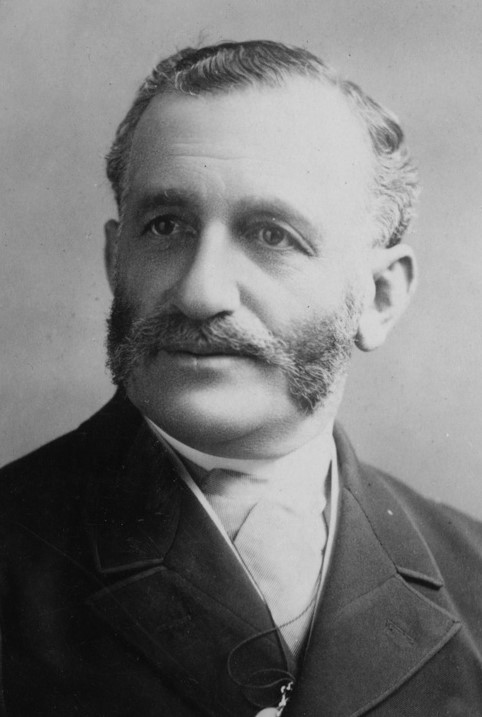

Maurice Salom (1 July 1831 – 10 October 1903) was a businessman and politician in the colony of South Australia.

== Biography ==
Salom was born in London to A. H. Salom, a member of an old family of Sephardic Jews, a merchant and at one time a planter in the West Indies. He received a good education and in 1846 he was articled to a London stockbroker, with whom he remained for three years, then spent some time as a merchant around the coast of Africa, dealing in commodities such as ivory, ostrich feathers and animal skins. He arrived in South Australia in 1852 and joined the auctioneering firm of Solomon and Co., whose principals were Isaac and Judah Solomon, which he later acquired, then in 1882 sold to a consortium of merchants.

He was elected to the Legislative Council in 1882 under the old system, when the whole Colony voted as one constituency. Six members were required, and out of 14 candidates Salom was returned second with 8,115 votes. He was asked by Sir John Downer to accept the Chief Secretaryship, but declined. In 1883–1884 he served on the Commission appointed to enquire into the operation of the Destitute Persons Act. In September, 1887, he introduced a Bill known as the First Offenders Act, which had the aim of keeping a first offender out of jail and giving him a chance of retrieving his name and living honestly. Salom did not seek re-election.

His business responsibilities included:

- Local board member Australian Mutual Provident Society

He was actively involved in a number of public and charitable institutions:

- Committee member of the Chamber of Commerce, and for a time its Chairman.
- Member of the Council of Education from its inception until it was abolished.
- Chairman of North Adelaide Grammar School committee..
- He was chairman of the house committee of the Adelaide Hospital, and while on that board was directly responsible for passage of the Public Charities Act of 1876 after finding that some donations had been diverted to the Government coffers. The first Commissioners of Charitable Funds were Salom (as Chairman), William Wyatt and William Kay. He held this position until his death. During his term of office his other colleagues were John Colton and William Gilbert. The fund was enlarged by some important donations, amounting to about £26,000, with the expectancy of another £100,000, and the commissioners were enabled to pay for the erection of the new building on the eastern side of the hospital, and also of the bacteriological laboratory and isolation wards. The commissioners also acted for the Destitute and Lunatic Asylums and the Port Augusta Hospital.
- He was president of the Hebrew Philanthropic Society for 40 years.
- He was at an early stage President of the Synagogue, but in later life took no part in church management.
- He was a Justice of the Peace for many years, and had an extensive knowledge of mercantile and insurance law. He held many Courts of Arbitration, acting mostly for the Government in adjusting claims in connection with lands taken for construction of railways and waterworks. He also acted as arbitrator in numerous private cases.
- He was one of the directors of the Commercial Bank of South Australia.
- He was an active Freemason, and held several high offices.

He died after a short illness and was buried in the Jewish section of the West Terrace Cemetery.

== Family ==
Salom married Kate Solomon (19 June 1837 – 7 June 1928) on 27 August 1856. Kate was a daughter of Moss Solomon (c. 1796–1849), sister of Judah Moss Solomon MLA, MLC (1818–1880) and Elias Solomon (1839–1909), and a niece of Emanuel Solomon MLC (1800–1873). They lived at Brougham Place, North Adelaide. Their children included:

- Robert Salom (c. 1855 – 16 July 1924) married Josie ( – 1 September 1923); he was a student of AEI, lived in New York from around 1880.
- Rebecca Salom (2 June 1860 – 13 April 1930) married Leopold Judell (1848–) on 25 February 1880, lived at Orroroo
- Rachael "Ray" Salom (28 March 1862 – ) married Maurice Harris (1833 – 6 December 1922) on 18 March 1896, lived at Christchurch, New Zealand. Harris was a wealthy retired merchant. Ray was his second wife; first was Elizabeth Phillips (1836–1892).
- Henry Isaac (Isaac Henry?) Salom (31 December 1865 – 22 February 1923) married Charlotte Mabel Searcy (1872–1958, daughter of Arthur Searcy) on 5 August 1896. He was a broker and agent of Grenfell Street, and treasurer of Adelaide Hospital's Samaritan Fund, from which he embezzled £250, and was jailed for 18 months. later worked for G. Wood & Son.
- Alfred M. Salom (c. 1868 – 22 January 1899) banker and footballer; died of typhoid
- Florence Sarah Salom (13 March 1869 – 11 January 1951) married jeweller Louis Saber ( – 20 October 1922) on 5 February 1890. He died insolvent.
- Laura E. Salom (14 August 1870 – 9 October 1945) married Leama Judah (a.k.a. Leama Robert) "Bob" Davies (c. 1862 – 26 June 1923) on 3 April 1889. He was timber merchant in Western Australia and London. She died in England.
- Horace Samuel Salom (28 October 1874 – 5 November 1959) married around 1900, had several children, lived in Perth, Western Australia
- Estelle Miriam Salom (24 February 1876 – 11 May 1960) married (later Sir) Michael Myers on 2 August 1899, lived at Wellington, New Zealand
- Lillian Ruth Salom (30 July 1877 – 30 January 1934) married Frederic S. L. Catchlove ( – ) on 15 June 1909, lived at Strangways Terrace, North Adelaide
- Walter Judah Salom (19 February 1879 – ) married Ruby Asher ( – ) on 6 September 1911, spent much time in South Africa.
- (his twin) Bertram Philip "Bertie" Salom (19 February 1879 – 27 August 1960) married Neva Eudora Shepherd ( – ) of Aldinga on 18 April 1911. They divorced in 1921. He married again, to Gwendolyn Baron ( – ) on 17 June 1926.

His sister Sarah married M. C. Davies, a timber merchant and pastoralist.
