= David Murray (South Australian politician) =

Australian politician

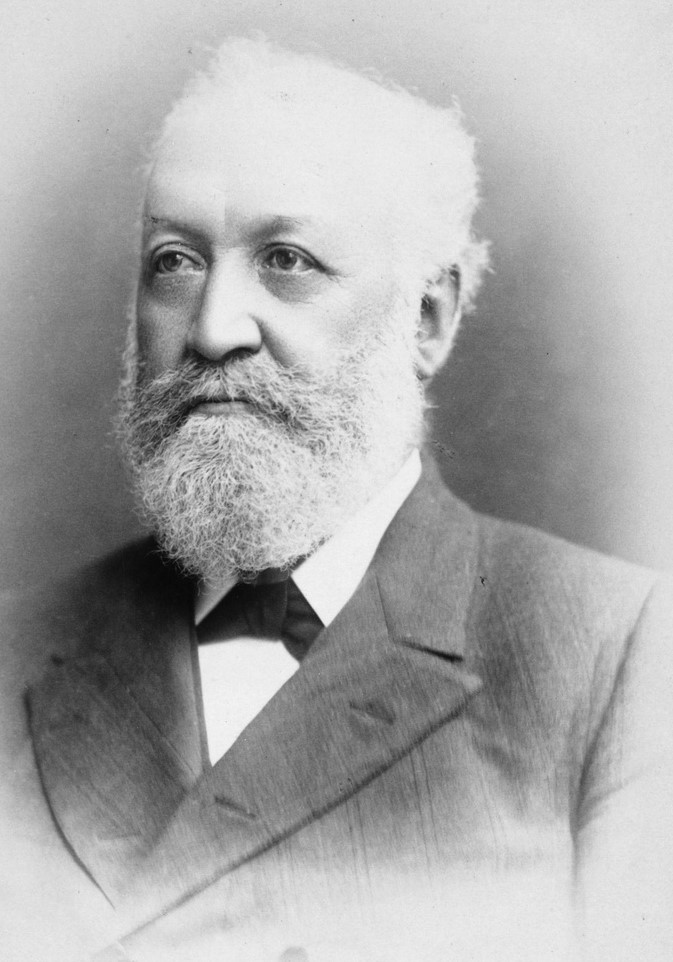

David Murray (28 December 1829 – 6 January 1907) was a politician in South Australia.

== Early life ==
David Murray was born on 28 December 1829 in Anstruther, Fife, Scotland, a son of William Murray. He and his brother William Mackintosh Murray (c. 1831 – 25 November 1920) had some experience in the retail and wholesale drapery trade, which included supplying retailers in the young colony of South Australia.

== Career ==
In early 1853 the brothers arrived in Adelaide, and began operating a retail drapery store in King William Street, which became the wholesale draper D. & W. Murray Limited, then Goode, Durrant & Murray second in importance only to G. & R. Wills.

=== Public office ===
Murray was elected to the House of Assembly for East Adelaide on 28 March 1870, serving until 23 December 1871. He represented East Torrens from 27 March 1877 to 13 March 1878. Murray was elected for Yatala on 25 April 1881 but was unseated on 28 June after being found guilty of bribery and corruption within the meaning of the Electoral Act of 1879.

In May 1882 Murray was elected to the South Australian Legislative Council, holding the seat until retiring on 14 April 1891.

Murray was appointed Chief Secretary in the Downer ministry, in succession to J. B. Spence, in July 1886.

== Other activities ==
Murray was a foundation member of the SA Geographical Society and a member of the Caledonian Society of South Australia, and its Chief 1887–1888. He is remembered as a patron of the Arts, having bequeathed a large collection of prints to the Art Gallery of South Australia, together with £3,000 for the establishment of a print room.

On 14 December 1886 Murray attended the inaugural dinner of the South Australian Institute of Architects at Beach's Cafe, along with almost every architect in the colony, and chairman of the Builders' Association and former mayor William Bundey.

== Personal life ==
On 9 May 1856 he married Rebecca Godfrey, and they had a son who died young. In March or April 1902 he left for England on account of the ill health of his wife, and never returned. He died on 6 January 1907.

Political offices
Preceded by John Spence	Chief Secretary of South Australia; 1887 – 1889	Succeeded by James Ramsay
