= James Rankine =

Australian politician

James Rankine (1828 – 8 September 1897) was a farmer, businessman and politician in the early days of the Colony of South Australia.

== History ==
Rankine was born in Ayrshire, Scotland, the eldest son of sheep farmer William Rankine and his wife Jane, née Paterson. He migrated with his parents to South Australia on the barque Fairfield in 1839 and settled at "Glenbarr", Strathalbyn, South Australia.

At the age of twenty years he was made manager of a property leased by his father and uncle, Dr. John Rankine, on Hindmarsh Island. After a few years wheat farming at Mundowie, near Gladstone in South Australia's Mid-North, he settled on his own property "Wyndgate" on Hindmarsh Island, where he raised cattle and pigs.

== Business ==
He was for a time agent in South Australia for the Cornwall Fire and Marine and Eagle Life Insurance Companies, and was one of the founders of and for over twenty years Director of the National Bank of Australasia.

== Politics ==
He was Chairman of the Alexandrina District Council for many years, and represented the electorate of Mount Barker in the House of Assembly from 1865 to 1868, and was elected to the Legislative Council in February 1881 and retired in April 1888.

== Other interests ==
He was an enthusiastic member of the volunteer militia, holding a commission as captain of the Military Rifle Company, then with the Milang and Strathalbyn Cavalry Corps. He was a crack shot, and won a first prize in the annual small-bore competition in Melbourne in 1866. He also acquitted himself well at the Wimbledon meeting of 1868.

His comments on public affairs were frequently published in the "Letters to the Editor" columns of the South Australian Register. The (opposition newspaper) Advertiser, in its obituary, described Rankine as a respected farmer without mentioning his political career or other achievements.

== Family ==
He married Isabel Agnes Beevor (ca.1836 – 19 January 1917) on 12 May 1869, lived at "Wyndgate" on Hindmarsh Island. Their children were:

- Mary Rankine (19 February 1871 – ) married Charles Downer of Kilkenny on 12 June 1901
- daughter 1 January 1875
- James Beevor Rankine (23 January 1877 – 6 October 1935) married Elinor Mabel ??
- daughter 13 September 1878 at Mundowie near Gladstone
- son 30 July 1880 born at "The Cottage", Strathalbyn
