= John Brodie Spence =

Australian politician

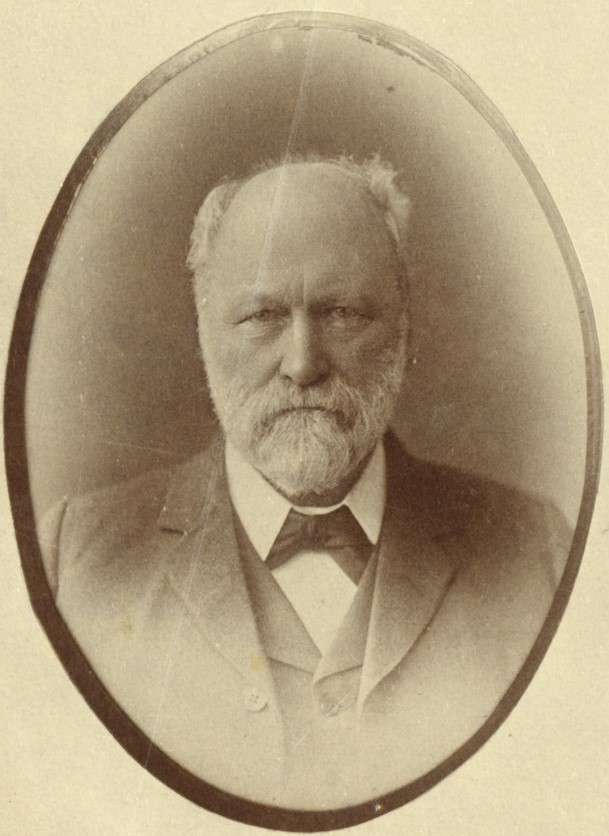
- In office 1881–1885

Personal details
- Born: 15 May 1824 Scotland
- Died: 7 December 1902 (aged 78)
- Spouse: Jessie Cumming (m. 1858)
- Relations: Catherine Helen Spence (Sister)
- Children: Lucy Morice (Daughter)
- Parents: David Spence (1790–1846) (father); Helen Spence née Brodie (1791–1887). (mother)
- Occupation: Banker, Politician, Commissioner of Public Works, Trustee of the State Bank, and Chairman of the board of the State Bank.
- Cabinet: Chief Secretary

John Brodie Spence (15 May 1824 – 7 December 1902) was a prominent Scottish-born banker and politician in the early days of South Australia. He was a brother of the reformer Catherine Helen Spence. And the father of Lucy Morice, a kindergarten worker, and social reformer.

Spence was born in Melrose, Scottish Borders to David Spence (1790–1846), solicitor and first Town Clerk of Adelaide, and Helen Brodie Spence (1791–1887). He arrived in South Australia aged 15 with his family on 29 October 1839 aboard Palmyra. (Note: Another person named Spence (or Spencer) arrived on 13 October 1839 aboard Dumfries, but who is thought to have had given name William, with wife listed as Harriet née Deed. In contrast, John's father was called David who was married to Helen née Brodie, so these two were different persons.) Other children of David and Helen on the passenger list were his sisters Catherine, Jessie, Helen and Mary and brother William.

The family was struggling to make ends meet, so after some seven months, he and his brother went farming, without much success, and he moved to Adelaide in 1845, joining either the Bank of Adelaide or the Bank of South Australia, where he remained for seven years. He was afterwards for five years official assignee and curator of intestate estates, then in 1856 accountant in the Railway Department, and from 1859 to 1864 Official Assignee and Curator of Intestate Estates, but left that office for the management of the English and Scottish Bank (soon to become English, Scottish and Australian Chartered Bank) which he held till 1878. Between around 1879 and 1881 he was involved with Arthur Harvey in land development at The Grange and East Adelaide.

He was elected a member of the legislative council in 1881, second on the poll with Henry Ayers, W. C. Buik, James Rankine, John Pickering, and R. A. Tarlton. He was Chief Secretary in the Downer Government from June to October 1885, when he retired to take the position of Commissioner of Public Works. In June 1886 he again took office as chief secretary, retiring the following month. On 5 February 1896 he was appointed one of the first five trustees of the State Bank, and was chairman of the board at the time of his death.

== Family ==
Spence's parents were David Spence (1790–1846) and Helen Spence née Brodie (1791–1887). Their other children were:

- Agnes Spence (9 February 1818 – 11 May 1835)
- Janet "Jessie" Spence (12 June 1821 – 21 November 1888) married Andrew Murray (c. 1814 – 7 October 1880) on 2 November 1841. He was businessman then journalist for the South Australian and later the Melbourne Argus and Economist.
- William Richard Spence (13 December 1822 – 1903 New Zealand )
- Catherine Helen Spence (31 October 1825 – 3 April 1910)
- David Spence, jnr. (1827–1890) stayed in Scotland for his education, emigrated in 1846. Never married.
- Mary Brodie Spence (c. 1830 – 22 November 1870) married William John Wren (c. 1829 – 6 February 1864) on 19 December 1855. Wren was with legal firm Bartley, Bakewell, & Stow, then solicitor in partnership with James Boucaut as Boucaut & Wren.
- Eliza Brodie Spence (1833-1836), born Melrose. Died young.

Spence married Jessie Cumming (1830 – 31 January 1910) on 22 April 1858. Their home was "Fenton", Glenelg. They had three daughters:

- Louise (Lucy) Morice née Spence (1 March 1859 – 10 June 1951), a kindergarten worker, and social reformer. She was awarded the MBE for her work with the free kindergarten movement. She married James Percy Morice on 20 March 1886.
- Agnes Helen Spence (19 December 1863 – 27 August 1949)
- Margaret Ethel Spence (26 August 1865 – ) married George A. Stephen on 18 August 1887

== Notes ==
Political offices
Preceded by John Colton	Chief Secretary of South Australia; 1885	Succeeded by John Bray
Preceded by John Darling	Commissioner of Public Works; 1885–1886	Succeeded by Luke Furner
Preceded by John Bray	Chief Secretary of South Australia; 1886	Succeeded by David Murray
