= William Buik =

Australian politician

William Christie Buik (13 May 1824 – 6 February 1903), commonly referred to as W. C. Buik, was Mayor of Adelaide 1878–1879.

== Early years ==
Buik was born on 13 May 1824 in Dundee, Scotland a son of Andrew Buik and Elizabeth (or Elspeth) Buik née Edward. He married Jane Clark Spankie on 22 November 1848 in Dundee, and they came to South Australia by the ship Coromandel in April 1849. Together they had seven children, all born in Adelaide:

		born	married		died	notes
1	James Spankie BUIK	21 Sep 1849	Emma Daws	19 Dec 1871		Prizewinning student of AEI
2	William Burness BUIK	10 May 1851			9 Oct 1853	
3	Robert Whyte BUIK	8 Jun 1852	Louise Pitt	9 Mar 1880		
4	Helen Spankie BUIK	5 Jan 1854	Frederick William Baily	8 Jun 1877	10 Jul 1937	
5	Jane Spankie BUIK	2 Dec 1856	Captain Alexander Bruce	29 Nov 1876	Nov 1890	
6	Emily Margaret BUIK	23 Jul 1860			16 Jul 1886	
7	William Edward BUIK	5 Dec 1862	Florence Adelaide Jury	1891	10 Nov 1929	

== Merchant ==
Buik began business as a partner and representative of Mr Robert Whyte, hardware merchant, under the style of Messrs. R. Whyte and Co. He subsequently moved to Rundle Street where he carried on business in his own account.

== Local government ==
He took an active interest in public affairs and entered the Adelaide Corporation as Councillor for Hindmarsh Ward in 1863 and served in that capacity for two years. From 1866 to 1867 he was mayor of the Town of Kensington and Norwood.

In 1878 he became Mayor of Adelaide. He filled the Chief Magistracy for a year and afterwards occupied a seat in the Council as Councillor for Hindmarsh Ward from 1879 to 1881 and as Alderman from 1881 to 1884. He was again returned as Alderman in 1892, and retired in 1895.

== Adelaide and Suburban Tramway Company ==
In 1871 Buik and Edwin T. Smith visited England and acquired valuable information and experience regarding the working of the horse-drawn carriages on tramway systems on public roads there. On their return they took a leading part in establishing the Adelaide and Suburban Tramway Company, the first of the kind in Australia, to connect the city with the suburbs of Kent Town, Norwood and Kensington. He was chosen as Chairman, a position he held up to the time of his death.

== Military reserve ==
From 1867 to 1870 he was captain of the Scottish Volunteer Rifle Club. When the Prince Alfred, the Duke of Edinburgh visited SA in 1867, His Royal Highness was so pleased with the discipline and military appearance of the Scottish Rifle Corps that he permitted the company to adopt the title of the "Duke of Edinburgh's Own".

In 1879, he was appointed captain in the Volunteer Reserve Force.

== State government ==
In 1881 he secured one of six vacant seats in the Legislative Council for which the colony then voted as a single constituency - "The Province" - and served the electors until 1888.

He was a member of the Adelaide Licensing Bench for many years and had a seat on the boards of public companies and some charitable institutions.

== Congregational Church ==
Buik took an active interest in religious work. He was a prominent member of the Congregational Church and for many years prior to his death had been a deacon of the Hindmarsh Square church. He also held a seat on the Council of the Congregational Union, and was on the management committee of the South Australian Auxiliary to the British and Foreign Bible Society.

== Later years ==
Jane died on 14 Nov 1890, at Norwood, and was buried on 17 Nov 1890, at West Terrace Cemetery. William died on 6 Feb 1903, at Norwood.

== Recognition ==
- A photograph of Buik hangs with those of other former mayors in the entrance to the Lord Mayor's office. There is also his portrait in oils hanging in the Council Chamber.
