= 7th Parliament of South Australia =

1871–1875 meeting of the South Australian Parliament

Seventh Parliament of South Australia
←	6th	8th	→
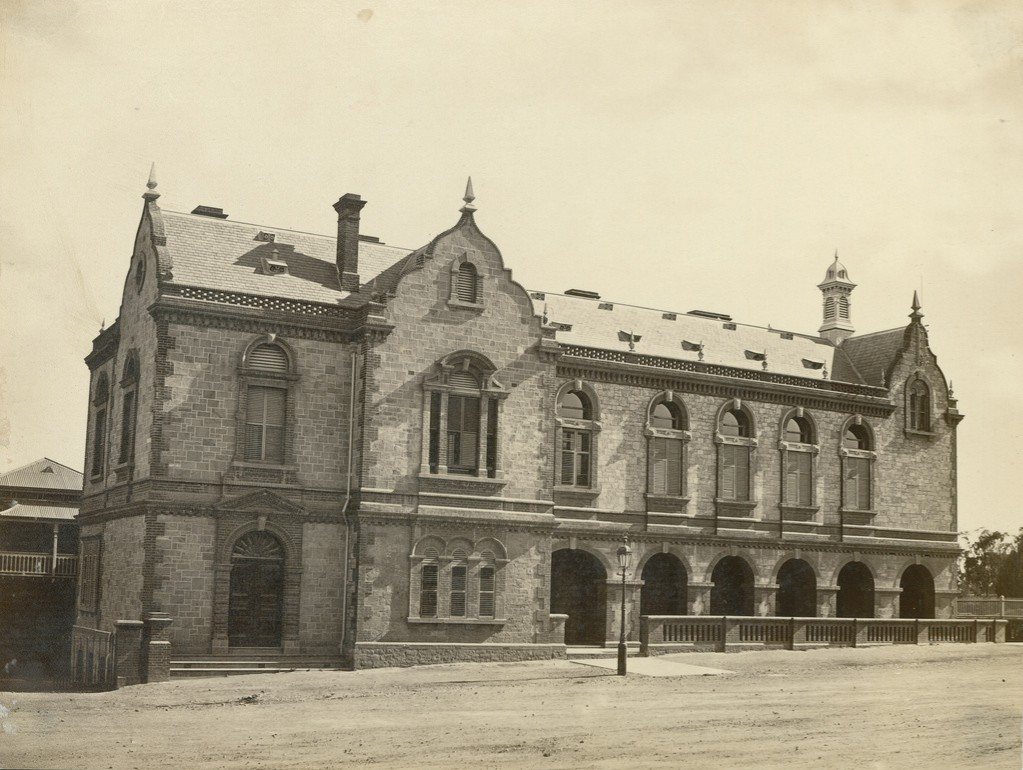
- Old Parliament House (1872)

Overview
- Legislative body: Parliament of South Australia
- Meeting place: Old Parliament House
- Term: 14 December 1871 – 14 January 1875
- Election: 14–27 December 1871

Legislative Council
- Members: 18
- President: John Morphett (until 1873); William Milne (from 1873)

House of Assembly
- Members: 36
- Speaker: George Strickland Kingston

Sessions
- 1st: 19 January 1872 – 30 November 1872
- 2nd: 25 July 1873 – 18 December 1873
- 3rd: 30 April 1874 – 6 November 1874

The 7th Parliament of South Australia was a meeting of the legislative branch of the South Australian state government, composed of the South Australian Legislative Council and the South Australian House of Assembly.

== Leadership ==
Legislative Council

- President of the Legislative Council: John Morphett (until 1873), William Milne (from 1873)
- Clerk of the Legislative Council: Francis Corbet Singleton
- Clerk's assistant and Sergeant-at-arms: Joseph George Atkinson Branthwaite (until 1874), Frederick Halcomb (from 1874)

House of Assembly

- Speaker of the House of Assembly: George Strickland Kingston
- Clerk of the House of Assembly: George William de la Poer Beresford
- Clerk's assistant and Sargeant-at-arms: Edwin Gordon Blackmore

== Membership ==
=== Legislative Council ===
==== Until 3 April 1873 ====
Members elected in 1869 are marked with an asterisk (*).

▌ Henry Ayers
▌ John Baker*
▌ John Crozier
▌ John Dunn, sen.*
▌ Thomas Elder*
▌ Thomas English*
▌ John Hodgkiss
▌ Thomas Hogarth
▌ Henry Mildred

▌ William Milne*
▌ William Morgan
▌ John Morphett
▌ Alexander Borthwick Murray*
▌ John Bentham Neales
▌ William Parkin
▌ Philip Santo
▌ William Storrie*
▌ William Wedd Tuxford

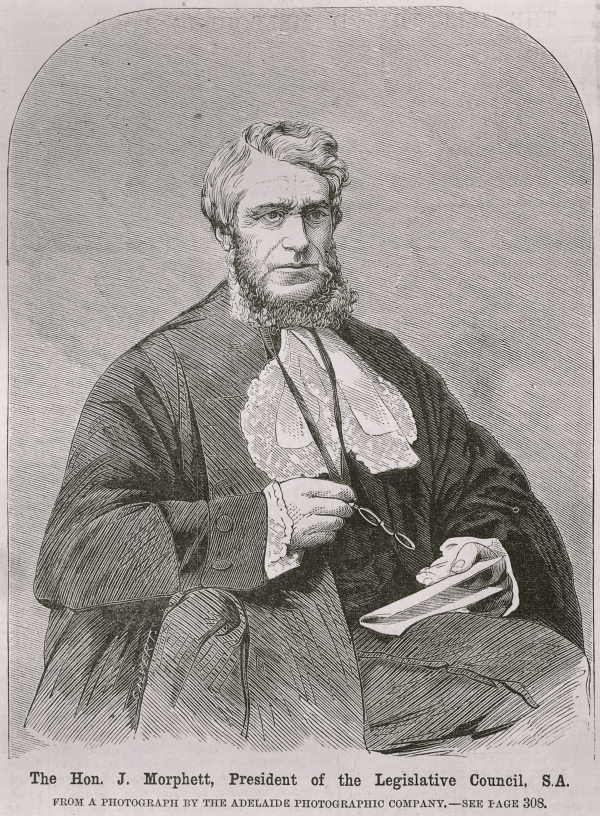
Legislative Council President
John Morphett (until 1873)

==== From 3 April 1873 ====
7 of the 18 seats in the upper house were contested in the election on 3 April 1873. Members elected in 1873 are marked with an asterisk (*).

▌ Henry Ayers*
▌ John Crozier
▌ John Dunn, sen.
▌ Walter Duffield*
▌ Thomas Elder
▌ Thomas English
▌ William Edward Everard*
▌ Joseph Fisher*
▌ Alexander Hay*

▌ Thomas Hogarth*
▌ William Milne
▌ William Morgan
▌ Alexander Borthwick Murray
▌ William Parkin
▌ William Sandover
▌ Philip Santo
▌ William Storrie
▌ Robert Alfred Tarlton*

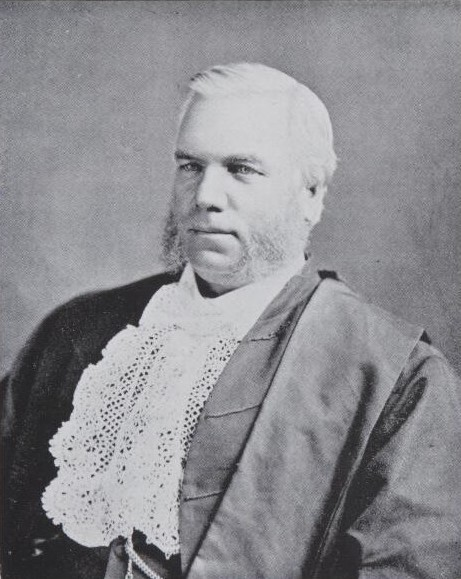
Legislative Council President
William Milne (from 1873)

=== House of Assembly ===
All 36 seats in the lower house were contested in the election on 14–27 December 1871.

Barossa

▌ John Howard Angas
▌ James Andrew Trehane Lake

The Burra

▌ Charles Mann
▌ Rowland Rees

East Adelaide

▌ John Cox Bray
▌ Robert Cottrell

East Torrens

▌ Edwin Thomas Smith
▌ George Stevenson

Encounter Bay

▌ Arthur Fydell Lindsay
▌ William Rogers

Flinders

▌ William Ranson Mortlock
▌ Alfred Watts

Gumeracha

▌ Arthur Blyth
▌ Ebenezer Ward

Light

▌ James Pearce
▌ Randolph Isham Stow

Mount Barker

▌ James Garden Ramsay
▌ William West-Erskine

Noarlunga

▌ John Carr
▌ Charles Myles

Onkaparinga

▌ William Henry Bundey
▌ Friedrich Edouard Heinrich Wulf Krichauff

Port Adelaide

▌ John Duncan
▌ Henry Kent Hughes

Stanley

▌ Henry Edward Bright
▌ George Strickland Kingston

The Sturt

▌ William Mair
▌ William Townsend

Victoria

▌ Thomas Wilde Boothby
▌ James Park Dawson Laurie

West Adelaide

▌ William Knox Simms
▌ Judah Moss Solomon

West Torrens

▌ James Boucaut
▌ John Pickering

Yatala

▌ Wentworth Cavenagh
▌ Lavington Glyde

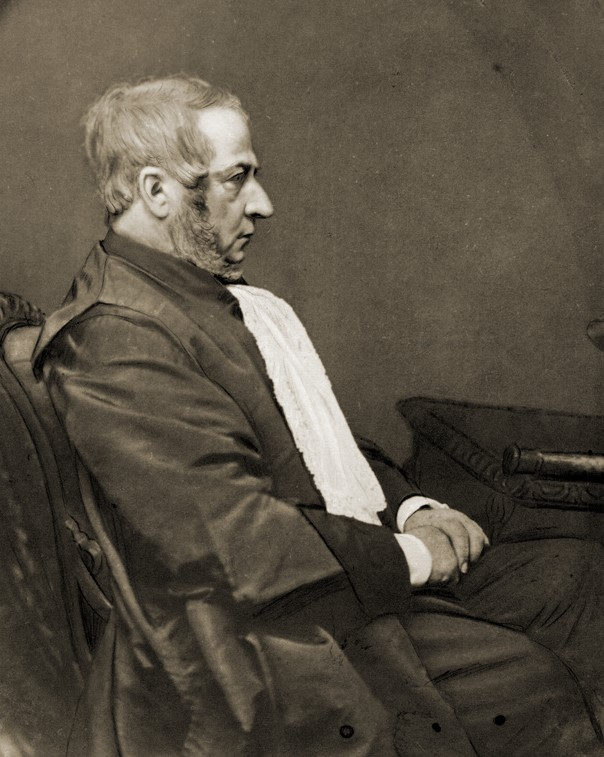
House of Assembly Speaker
George Strickland Kingston

== Changes of membership ==
=== Legislative Council ===
Before	Change		After	
Member	Type	Date	Date	Member
John Baker	Died	29 November 1872	Vacant	
John Bentham Neales	Died	26 August 1873	22 September 1873	William Sandover

=== House of Assembly ===
Seat	Before	Change		After	
Seat	Member	Type	Date	Date	Member
Encounter Bay	William Edward Everard	Unseated	2 February 1872	29 February 1872	William Rogers
Encounter Bay	Thomas Reynolds	Unseated	2 February 1872	29 February 1872	Thomas Reynolds
The Burra	John Hart, sen.	Died	28 January 1873	3 April 1873	Rowland Rees
Victoria	John Riddoch	Resigned	28 April 1873	29 May 1873	James Park Dawson Laurie
Victoria	Edwin Henry Derrington	Resigned	6 May 1873	17 June 1873	Thomas Wilde Boothby
Encounter Bay	Thomas Reynolds	Resigned	28 August 1873	5 September 1873	Arthur Fydell Lindsay
Light	Mountifort Longfield Conner	Resigned	11 September 1873	18 September 1873	Randolph Isham Stow
The Sturt	John Henry Barrow	Died	22 August 1874	7 September 1874	William Mair

== See also ==
- Members of the South Australian Legislative Council, 1869–1873
- Members of the South Australian Legislative Council, 1873–1877
- Members of the South Australian House of Assembly, 1871–1875
