= Members of the South Australian House of Assembly, 1871–1875 =

This is a list of members of the seventh parliament of the South Australian House of Assembly, which sat from 19 January 1872 until 14 January 1875. The members were elected at the 1871 colonial election.

Name	Electorate	Term in Office
John Howard Angas	Barossa	1871–1876
John Henry Barrow ^{[1]}	The Sturt	1858–1860, 1871–1874
Hon. Arthur Blyth	Gumeracha	1857–1868, 1870–1877
Thomas Boothby ^{[6]}	Victoria	1873–1875
James Boucaut	West Torrens	1861–1862, 1865–1870, 1871–1878
John Cox Bray	East Adelaide	1871–1892
Henry Bright	Stanley	1865–1884
William Bundey	Onkaparinga	1871–1875, 1878–1881
John Carr	Noarlunga	1865–1879, 1881–1884
Wentworth Cavenagh	Yatala	1862–1875, 1875–1881
Mountifort Conner ^{[8]}	Light; Albert	1871–1873; 1875
Robert Cottrell	East Adelaide	1868–1875
Edwin Derrington ^{[6]}	Victoria	1871–1873
John Duncan	Port Adelaide	1871–1875, 1875–1878, 1884–1890
William Everard ^{[2]}	Encounter Bay	1865–1870, 1871–1872
Lavington Glyde	Yatala	1857–1875, 1877–1884
John Hart ^{[4]}	The Burra	1857–1859, 1862–1866, 1868–1873
Henry Kent Hughes	Port Adelaide	1868–1875
Sir George Kingston	Stanley	1857–1860, 1861–1880
Friedrich Krichauff	Onkaparinga	1857–1858, 1870–1882, 1884–1890
J. A. T. Lake	Barossa	1871–1875
Park Laurie ^{[5]}	Victoria	1870–1871, 1873–1875
Arthur Fydell Lindsay ^{[7]}	Encounter Bay	1857–1860, 1870–1871, 1873–1878
William Mair ^{[1]}	The Sturt	1874–1875
Charles Mann	The Burra	1870–1881
William Ranson Mortlock	Flinders	1868–1870, 1871–1875, 1878–1884
Charles Myles	Noarlunga	1871–1875
James Pearce	Light	1870–1875
John Pickering	West Torrens	1865–1868, 1870, 1871–1878
James Garden Ramsay	Mount Barker	1870–1875, 1876–1878
Rowland Rees ^{[4]}	The Burra	1873–1881, 1882–1890
Hon. Thomas Reynolds ^{2, 7}	Encounter Bay	1857–1862, 1862, 1864–1870, 1871–1872, 1872–1873
John Riddoch ^{[4]}	Victoria	1865–1870, 1871–1873
William Rogers	Encounter Bay	1858–1860, 1864–1865, 1868, 1868–1870, 1872–1875
William Knox Simms	West Adelaide	1868–1870, 1871–1876, 1878–1881
Judah Solomon	West Adelaide	1858–1860, 1871–1875
Edwin Smith	East Torrens	1871–1877, 1878–1893
George Stevenson	East Torrens	1871–1875
Randolph Isham Stow ^{[8]}	Light	1861–1865, 1866–1868, 1873–1875
William Townsend	The Sturt	1857–1882
Ebenezer Ward	Gumeracha	1870–1880, 1881–1890
Alfred Watts	Flinders	1862–1866, 1868–1875
William West-Erskine ^{[3]}	Mount Barker	1871–1876, 1878–1881

== Notes ==
^{1} The Sturt MHA John Henry Barrow died on 22 August 1874. William Mair won the resulting by-election on 7 September.
^{2} Thomas Reynolds and William Everard were initially declared elected as the two members for Encounter Bay, but their election was challenged and they were unseated on 2 February 1872. A by-election was held on 29 February, which saw Reynolds re-elected and Everard defeated by William Rogers.
^{3} The member for Mount Barker, William West, changed his name to William West-Erskine in June 1872.
^{4} The Burra MHA John Hart died on 28 January 1873. Rowland Rees won the resulting by-election on 3 April.
^{5} Victoria MHA John Riddoch resigned on 28 April 1873. Park Laurie won the resulting by-election on 29 May.
^{6} Victoria MHA Edwin Derrington resigned by 6 May 1873. Thomas Boothby won the resulting by-election on 17 June.
^{7} Encounter Bay MHA Thomas Reynolds resigned on 28 August 1873. Arthur Fydell Lindsay won the resulting by-election on 5 September.
^{8} Light MHA Mountifort Conner resigned on 11 September 1873. Randolph Isham Stow won the resulting by-election on 18 September. He was elected to Albert 22 Feb 1875 and resigned 23 Jun 1875.
