= 6th Parliament of South Australia =

1870–1871 meeting of the South Australian Parliament

Sixth Parliament of South Australia
←	5th	7th	→
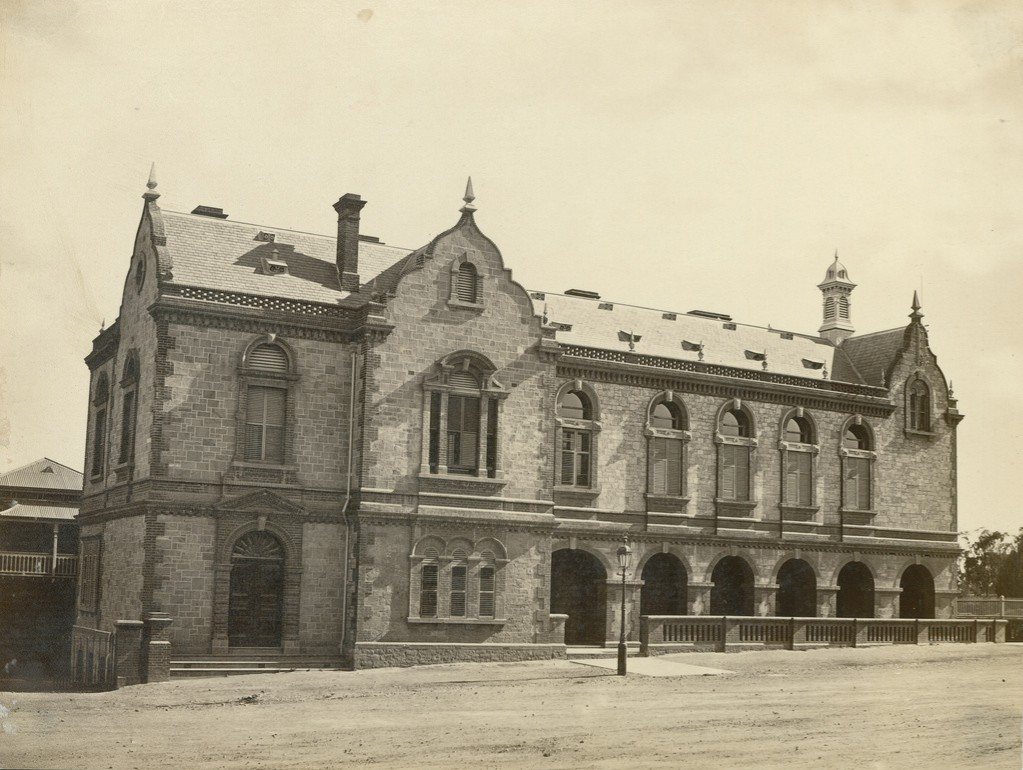
- Old Parliament House (1872)

Overview
- Legislative body: Parliament of South Australia
- Meeting place: Old Parliament House
- Term: 27 May 1870 – 23 November 1871
- Election: 28 March – 5 April 1870

Legislative Council
- Members: 18
- President: John Morphett

House of Assembly
- Members: 36
- Speaker: George Strickland Kingston

Sessions
- 1st: 27 May 1870 – 13 January 1871
- 2nd: 28 July 1871 – 23 November 1871

The 6th Parliament of South Australia was a meeting of the legislative branch of the South Australian state government, composed of the South Australian Legislative Council and the South Australian House of Assembly.

== Leadership ==
Legislative Council

- President of the Legislative Council: John Morphett
- Clerk of the Legislative Council: Francis Corbet Singleton
- Clerk's assistant and Sergeant-at-arms: Joseph George Atkinson Branthwaite

House of Assembly

- Speaker of the House of Assembly: George Strickland Kingston
- Clerk of the House of Assembly: George William de la Poer Beresford
- Clerk's assistant and Sargeant-at-arms: Edwin Gordon Blackmore

== Membership ==
=== Legislative Council ===
Members elected in 1869 are marked with an asterisk (*).

▌ Henry Ayers
▌ John Baker*
▌ John Crozier
▌ John Dunn, sen.*
▌ Thomas Elder*
▌ Thomas English*
▌ John Hodgkiss
▌ Thomas Hogarth
▌ Henry Mildred

▌ William Milne*
▌ William Morgan
▌ John Morphett
▌ Alexander Borthwick Murray*
▌ John Bentham Neales
▌ William Parkin
▌ Philip Santo
▌ William Storrie*
▌ William Wedd Tuxford

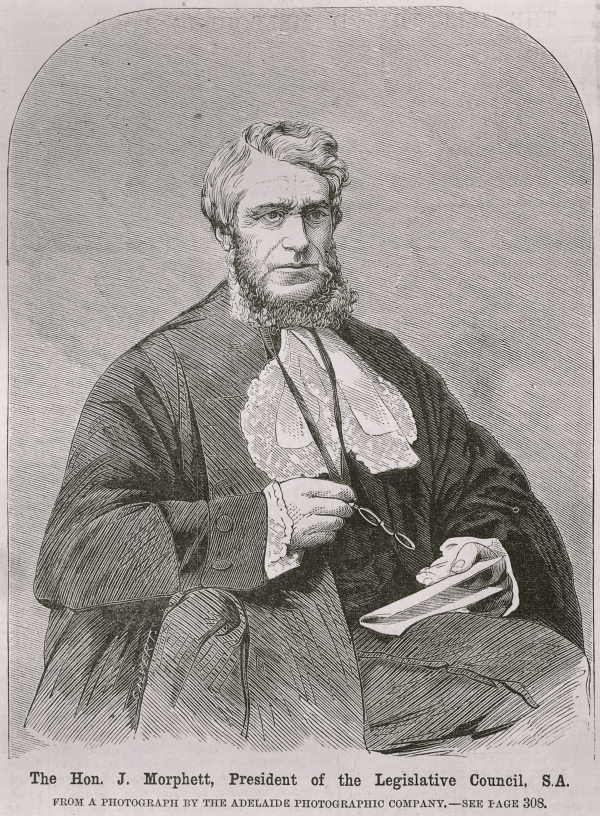
Legislative Council President
John Morphett

=== House of Assembly ===
All 36 seats in the lower house were contested in the 28 March – 5 April 1870.

Barossa

▌ Richard Chaffey Baker
▌ Walter Duffield

The Burra

▌ John Hart, sen.
▌ Charles Mann

East Adelaide

▌ Robert Cottrell
▌ David Murray

East Torrens

▌ Alexander Hay
▌ Henry Hay Mildred

Encounter Bay

▌ Arthur Fydell Lindsay
▌ Emil Wentzel

Flinders

▌ Hampton Gleeson
▌ Alfred Watts

Gumeracha

▌ Arthur Blyth
▌ Ebenezer Ward

Light

▌ James Pearce
▌ James White

Mount Barker

▌ John Cheriton
▌ James Garden Ramsay

Noarlunga

▌ John Carr
▌ James Stewart

Onkaparinga

▌ Friedrich Edouard Heinrich Wulf Krichauff
▌ Thomas Playford

Port Adelaide

▌ Henry Kent Hughes
▌ William Quin

Stanley

▌ Henry Edward Bright
▌ George Strickland Kingston

The Sturt

▌ John Lindsay
▌ William Townsend

Victoria

▌ Neville Blyth
▌ Park Laurie

West Adelaide

▌ Patrick Boyce Coglin
▌ John Darling, sen.

West Torrens

▌ William Henry Bean
▌ James Penn Boucaut

Yatala

▌ Wentworth Cavenagh
▌ Lavington Glyde

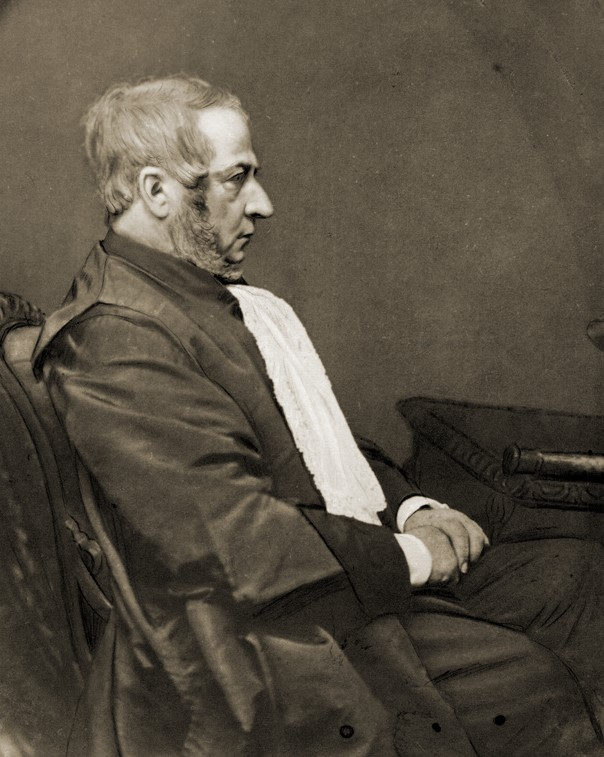
House of Assembly Speaker
George Strickland Kingston

== Changes of membership ==
=== Legislative Council ===
Before	Change		After	
Member	Type	Date	Date	Member
John Tuthill Bagot	Resigned	16 June 1870	4 July 1870	John Bentham Neales
John Henry Barrow	Resigned	7 September 1871	4 October 1871	William Storrie
Emanuel Solomon	Resigned	7 September 1871	4 October 1871	Philip Santo
Augustine Stow	Resigned	7 September 1871	4 October 1871	Thomas Elder

=== House of Assembly ===
Seat	Before	Change		After	
Seat	Member	Type	Date	Date	Member
Light	Edward Angus Hamilton	Resigned	28 July 1871	12 August 1871	James White
Victoria	William Paltridge	Resigned	28 July 1871	24 August 1871	Neville Blyth
West Torrens	Henry Bull Templer Strangways	Resigned	28 July 1871	10 August 1871	James Penn Boucaut

== See also ==
- Members of the South Australian Legislative Council, 1869–1873
- Members of the South Australian House of Assembly, 1870–1871
