= Samuel Way =

Australian politician

The Right Honourable Sir Samuel Way PC Bt
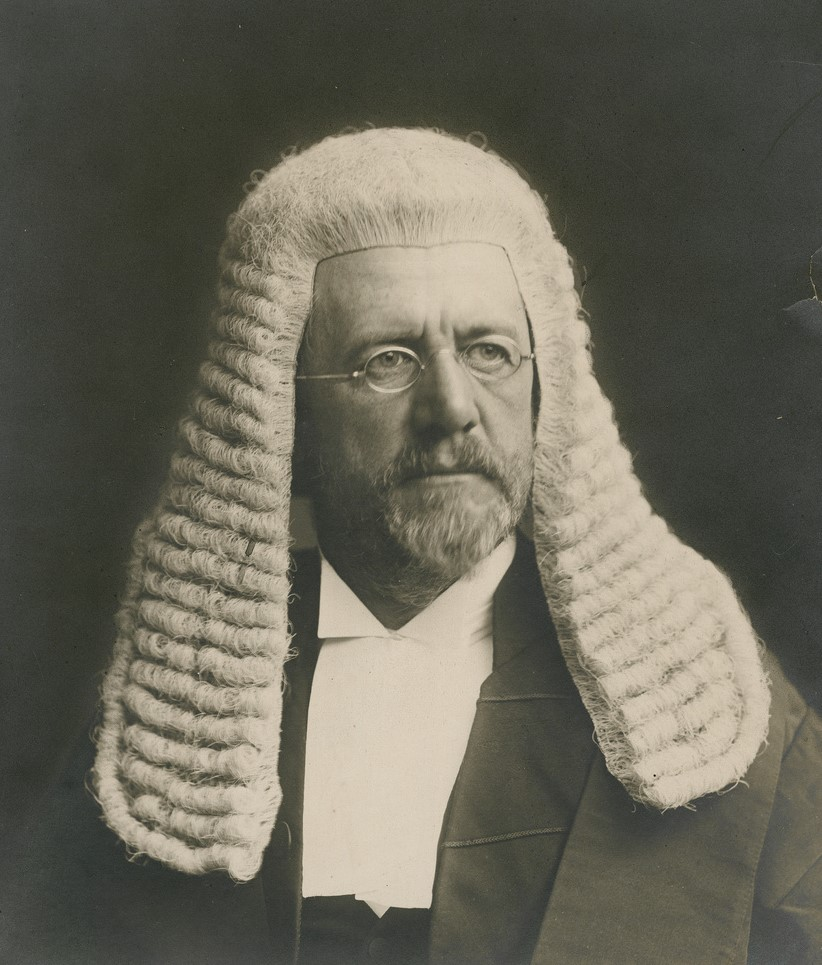

3rd Chancellor of the University of Adelaide
- In office 1883 – 8 January 1916
- Preceded by: Rt Rev. Augustus Short
- Succeeded by: Sir George Murray

Chief Justice of South Australia
- In office 18 March 1876 – 8 January 1916
- Preceded by: Sir Richard Hanson
- Succeeded by: Sir George Murray

Administrator of South Australia
- In office 17 July 1902 – 30 June 1903
- Premier: James Boucaut
- Preceded by: Lord Tennyson (as Governor)
- Succeeded by: Sir George Le Hunte (as Governor)

2nd Vice-Chancellor of the University of Adelaide
- In office 1876–1883
- Chancellor: Augustus Short
- Preceded by: Augustus Short
- Succeeded by: Rev. W. Roby Fletcher

Attorney-General of South Australia

Member of Parliament for Sturt
- In office 3 June 1875 – 18 March 1876
- Preceded by: Charles Mann
- Succeeded by: Henry Gawler
- In office 10 February 1875 – 20 March 1876
- Preceded by: William Mair
- Succeeded by: Thomas King

Personal details
- Born: 11 April 1836 Portsmouth, Hampshire, England
- Died: 8 January 1916 (aged 79) North Adelaide, South Australia
- Parent: Reverend James Way (father)

Sir Samuel James Way, 1st Baronet, (11 April 1836 – 8 January 1916) was an English-Australian jurist who served as Chief Justice of the Supreme Court of South Australia from 18 March 1876 until 8 January 1916.

== Background ==
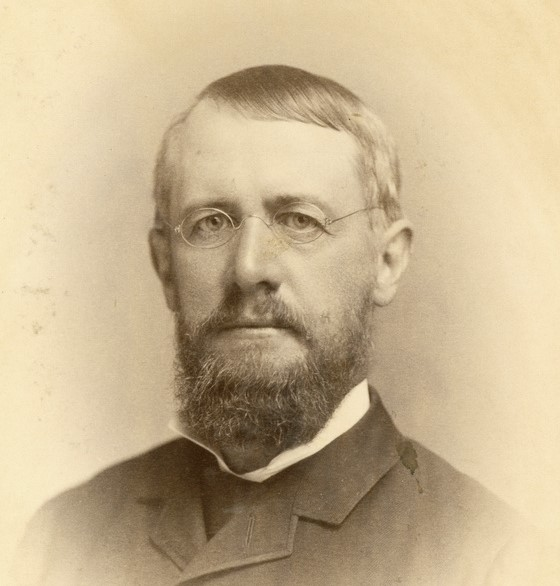

Way was born in Portsmouth, England. Reverend James Way, his father, was a clergyman in the Bible Christian Church, who emigrated to Adelaide, South Australia in 1850 along with his wife and four younger children to establish a mission. Samuel, the eldest child, remained behind, studying at Shebbear College in Shebbear, a small village in North Devon, and later at a school in Chatham in Kent. He left England to rejoin his family at the end of 1852, arriving in Adelaide in March 1853. He was soon employed in the office of John Tuthill Bagot, at that time a barrister, and in 1856 became an articled clerk to Alfred Atkinson (c. 1825 – 4 June 1861), solicitor of King William Street.

== Legal and judicial career ==
On 25 March 1861, Way was admitted to the South Australian Bar to practice law, and when Atkinson died shortly afterwards, Way inherited his practice. Way practised as a barrister and quickly became a leader among the legal community, and in 1868 joined a partnership with another barrister, James Brook. In September 1871, Way was made a Queen's Counsel, despite having been admitted to the bar only ten years earlier. When Brook died in 1872, a young Josiah Symon joined Way as partner. Way continued to be highly successful, travelling to London to argue a number of cases before the Judicial Committee of the Privy Council. In 1874, Way was elected as a member of the council of the University of Adelaide, and was also appointed to the South Australian Board of Education.

In 1875, Way was elected to the South Australian House of Assembly as the member for Sturt, and on 3 June of that year joined the Boucaut government as Attorney-General of South Australia. He was only a politician for a short time, however, since in March 1876, at the age of just thirty-nine, he was appointed Chief Justice of South Australia following the death of Richard Hanson on 4 March. Since it is the role of the Attorney-General to recommend judicial candidates to the cabinet, it has been suggested that Way probably nominated himself to be Chief Justice. Way soon gained a reputation as an excellent lawyer, and it has been said that none of his decisions were ever successfully appealed to a higher court. Later in 1876 he was appointed as the vice-chancellor of the University of Adelaide, and in 1883 became the chancellor, a position he would hold until his death.

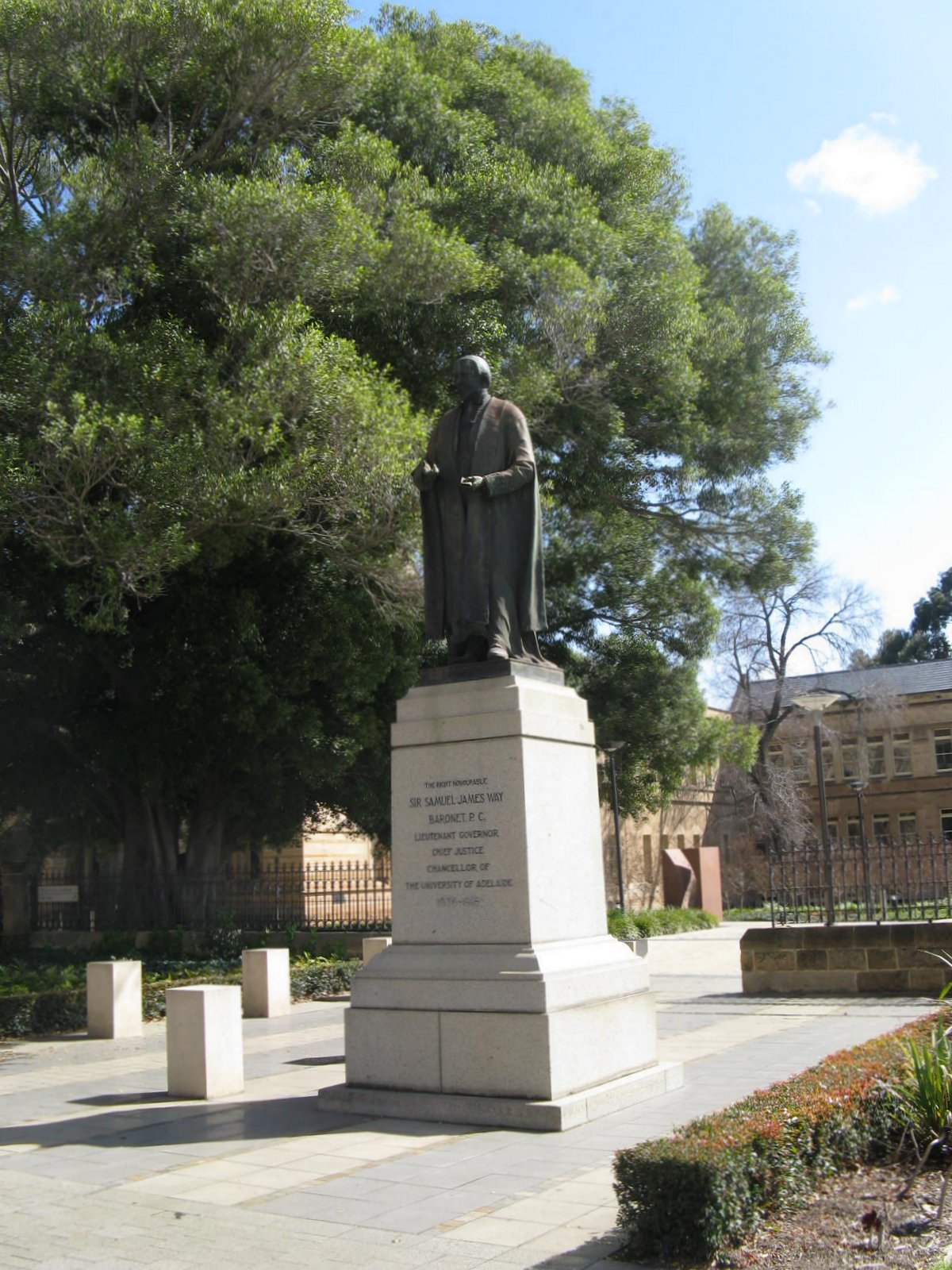
Statue of Sir Samuel Way on North Terrace, Adelaide in front of the University of Adelaide.

In 1877, Way was called upon to act as acting Governor of South Australia. In January 1891 he was appointed to the position of Lieutenant-Governor of South Australia, a position subordinate to the state Governor. In January 1897, Way became the first Australian to be appointed to the Judicial Committee of the Privy Council and was sworn into the position in Westminster on 18 May 1897, and gaining the title The Right Honourable.

In 2 August 1899 Way was created a Baronet, of Montefiore, North Adelaide, and Kadlunga Mintaro, both in the Colony of South Australia.

In 1902, when Lord Tennyson vacated the role of Governor of South Australia to assume the role of Governor-General of Australia, Way was commissioned as Administrator of South Australia, and remained in that role until 1903.

In October 1905, it was Way who publicly pronounced that Catherine Helen Spence, writer and suffragist, social worker and feminist was the most distinguished woman in Australia.

Way was a Freemason and Grand Master of the Grand Lodge of South Australia and Northern Territory from 1884 to 1916, apart from the period 1889–95 when the position was occupied by the Governor, the Earl of Kintore.

== Personal life ==
Way married Mrs. Katherine Gollan Blue (née Gordon) on 11 April 1898. She was the widow of Dr. William Archibald Sinclair Blue (died 18 September 1896) of Strathalbyn. The time and whereabouts of the wedding, which was the subject of great public interest, were a closely kept secret until well after the event.

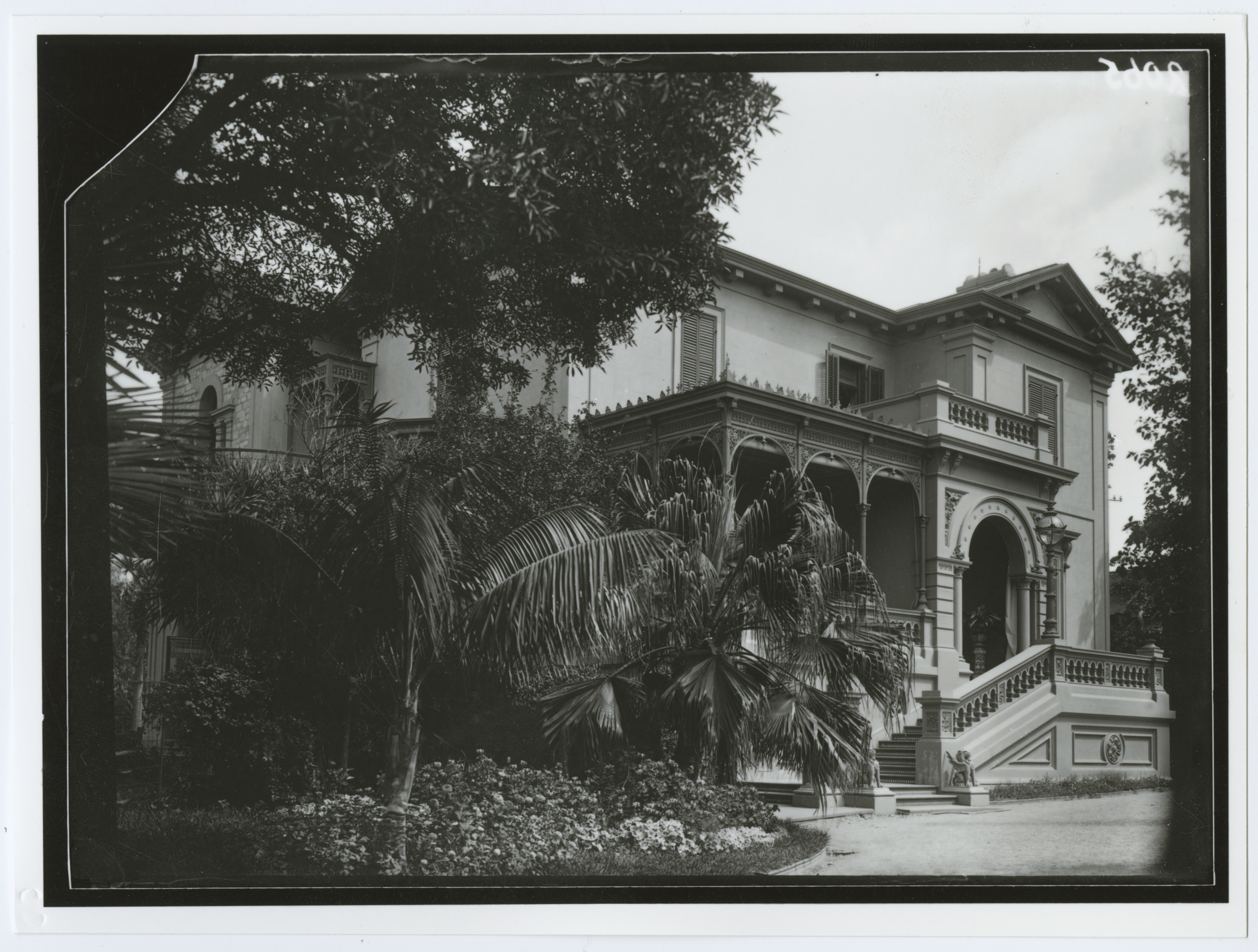
Eastern view c. 1890 of Montefiore, Way's residence at North Adelaide. After his death the second storey was removed. The house is now a part of Aquinas College.

Way became ill in 1914, and was diagnosed with cancer. He travelled to Sydney to have his arm amputated, in an attempt to delay the cancer. The operation failed to prevent his health from deteriorating, but he continued his work as Chief Justice until December 1915. He died early the following year in North Adelaide.

== Recognition ==
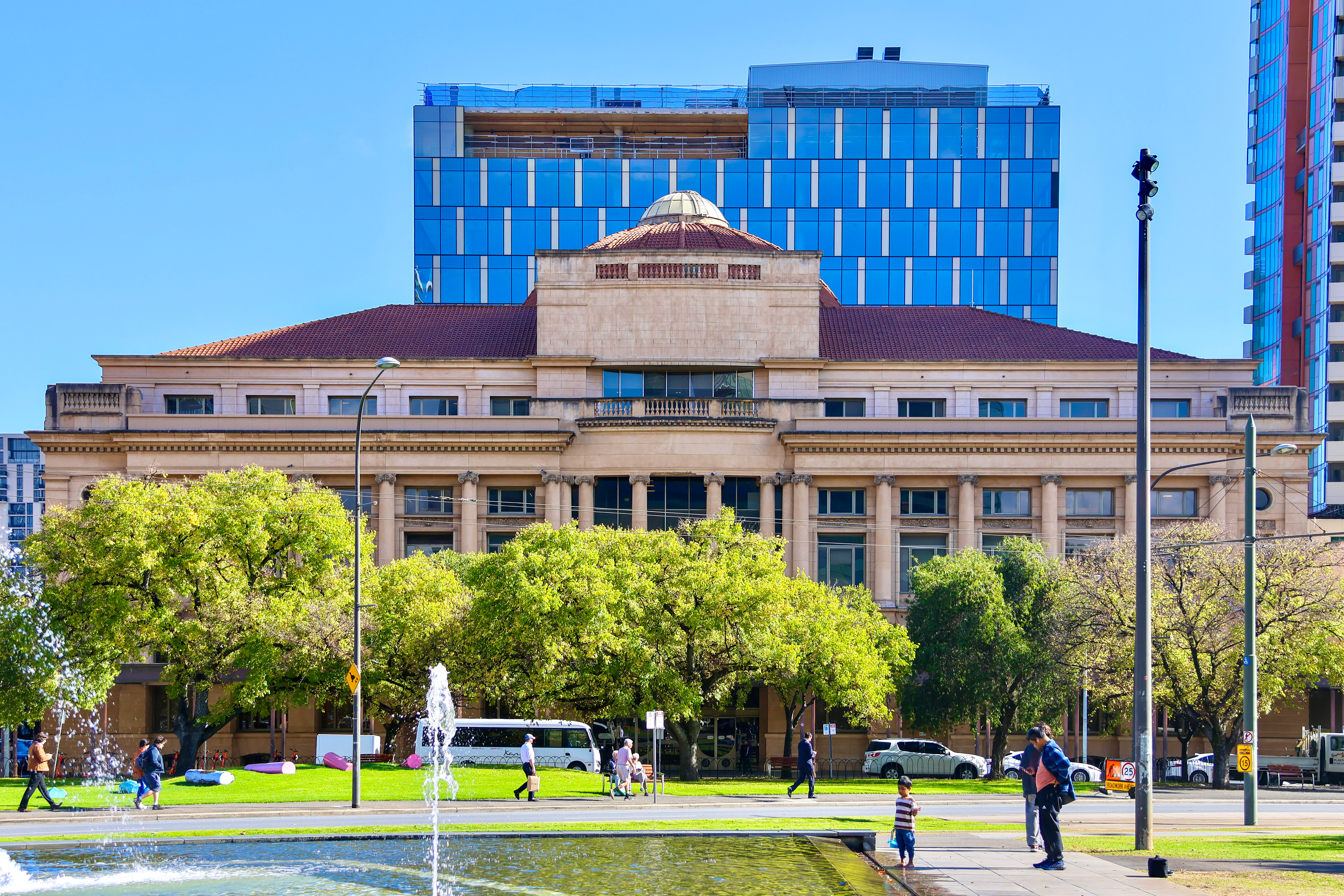
Samuel Way Building on Victoria Square, Adelaide

The baronetcy became extinct on his death. The geological feature Mount Sir Samuel and the town of Sir Samuel in the Goldfields region of Western Australia were named after him.

A statue was unveiled on 17 November 1924, located on North Terrace, Adelaide, in front of the University of Adelaide.

The Sir Samuel Way Building on Victoria Square, Adelaide, was originally a major retail outlet for Charles Moore and Co. In 1983 it was sold to the state government and was named after him.

== Bibliography ==
- Hannan, A. J., C. M. G., Q. C., The Life of Chief Justice Way, Angus and Robertson, Sydney, 1960.
- Emerson, Dr. John, First Among Equals, University of Adelaide Barr Smith Press, Adelaide, 2004, pp 11–56.

South Australian House of Assembly
Preceded by William Mair	Member for Sturt; 1875–1876; Served alongside: William Townsend	Succeeded by Thomas King
Political offices
Preceded by Charles Mann	Attorney-General of South Australia; 1875–1876	Succeeded by Henry Gawler
Legal offices
Preceded by Sir Richard Hanson	Chief Justice of South Australia; 1876–1916	Succeeded by Sir George Murray
Government offices
New title	Lieutenant-Governor of South Australia; 1877–1916	Succeeded by Sir George Murray
Academic offices
Preceded by Augustus Short	Vice-Chancellor of the University of Adelaide; 1876–1883	Succeeded by William Roby Fletcher
Preceded by Augustus Short	Chancellor of the University of Adelaide; 1883–1916	Succeeded by Sir George Murray
Baronetage of the United Kingdom
New title	Baronet (of Montefiore and Kadlunga Mintaro); 1899–1916	Extinct
Preceded by Scott baronets	Way baronets of Montefiore and Kadlunga Mintaro; 2 August 1899	Succeeded by Brooke baronets
