= The Chronicle (South Australia) =

Former South Australian weekly newspaper

The Chronicle was a South Australian weekly newspaper, printed from 1858 to 1975, which evolved through a series of titles. It was printed by the publishers of The Advertiser, its content consisting largely of reprints of articles and Births, Marriages and Deaths columns from the parent newspaper. Its target demographic was country areas where mail delivery was infrequent and businesses that serviced those areas.

== History ==
=== South Australian Weekly Chronicle ===
When The South Australian Advertiser was first published, on 12 July 1858, the editor and managing director, John H. Barrow, also announced the South Australian Weekly Chronicle, which was published on Saturdays.

=== South Australian Chronicle and Weekly Mail ===
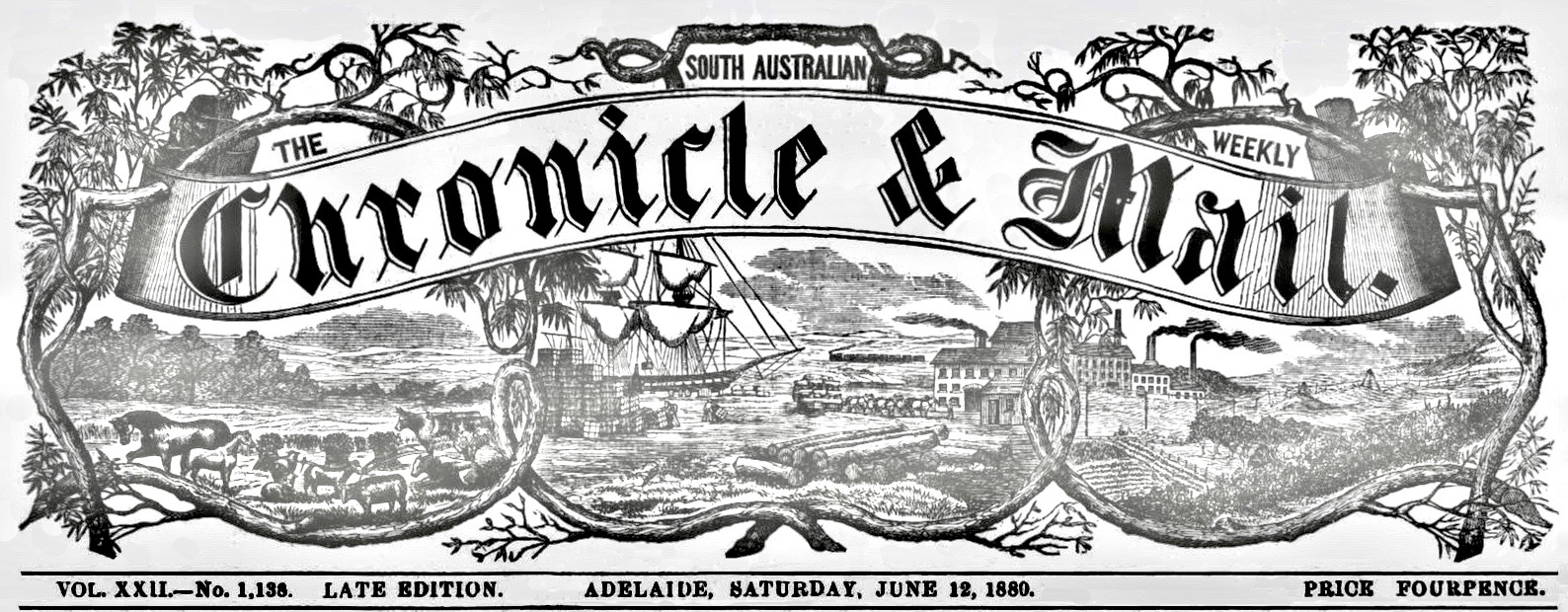
The paper's masthead in 1880

On 4 January 1868, with the installation of a new steam press, the size of the paper doubled to four sheets, or sixteen pages, and changed its banner to The South Australian Chronicle and Weekly Mail. The editor at this time was William Hay, and its offices were on Grenfell Street.

=== South Australian Weekly Chronicle ===
On 16 April 1881, its banner was changed to The South Australian Weekly Chronicle, with which is incorporated the Weekly Mail. At this time, it was 24 pages, and the proprietors were Thomas King, Frederic Britten Burden, and John Langdon Bonython, and it was published at their offices, corner of King William and Currie Street, Adelaide.

=== South Australian Chronicle ===
On 16 March 1889, its banner was changed to The South Australian Chronicle, with which is incorporated the Weekly Mail. At this time, it was 24 pages, and the proprietors were Frederic Britten Burden, and John Langdon Bonython, and was it published in the offices of the South Australian Advertiser, Chronicle and Express, corner of King William and Currie Street, Adelaide.

=== The Chronicle ===
On 5 October 1895, its banner was changed to The Chronicle, with which is incorporated the Weekly Mail. At this time, it was 48 pages, and the proprietor was John Langdon Bonython, trading as J. L. Bonython, and was published in the offices of the South Australian Advertiser, The South Australian Chronicle and Express, corner of King William and Currie Street, Adelaide.

Between 1957 and 1969, a rural edition, titled Chronicle: South East edition, was also published.

=== Closure ===
The last edition was 26 September 1975, and Chronicle employees were transferred to The Advertiser.

== Digitisation ==
- South Australian Weekly Chronicle (Adelaide, SA : 1858 - 1867) at Trove
- Chronicle (Adelaide, SA : 1895 - 1954) at Trove
