= William Thornborough Hayward =

Dr. William Thornborough Hayward CMG., LLD., MRCS., LRCPI. (26 June 1854 – 21 December 1928), was a medical doctor in South Australia.

== History ==
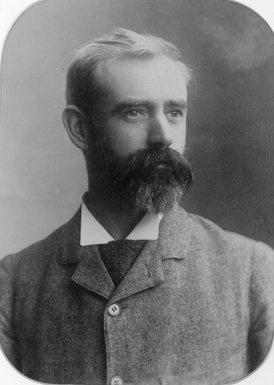
Dr. William Thornborough Hayward

Hayward was born in England, the son of William G. Hayward and Dionysia Hayward, née Barnes of Reading, England. He was educated at King’s and Queen’s College of Ireland. and at St. John's College, Hurstpierpoint. In 1869 he entered the Royal Infirmary School of Medicine, Liverpool, and at the age of 15 passed the primary examination of the Royal College of Surgeons. In 1872 he was a silver medalist in medicine, surgery, and pathology, and an exhibitioner at the Liverpool Royal Infirmary. He was appointed assistant to a general practitioner in 1873 and qualified LRCPI and LM in 1874.

He served as ship's surgeon on with the Pacific Steam Navigation Company's mail steamers to South America for two trips, then was appointed house surgeon to Mr. Bickersteth, an early disciple of Joseph Lister, at the Liverpool Royal Infirmary, and became familiar with the use of Thomas splints, for which he became a proselytizer. In that year he was made a member of the Royal College of Surgeons, and a few months later he was made house surgeon at Liverpool Children's Hospital. Dr. Hayward made several more voyages to various countries as ship's surgeon, including three times to Australia in 1877–1878. He left his ship, Oaklands, in Adelaide early in October 1878, and married the following year. He practised at Riverton for four years, then they moved to Norwood and a house on The Parade. He was elected honorary physician to the Adelaide Hospital in 1885. In 1886, he was appointed lecturer in clinical medicine at the University of Adelaide, a position he held for 13 years, and lecturer in materia medica and therapeutics from 1888 to 1920. He represented the University on the Adelaide Hospital's board of management.

In August 1915 he left with the Australian Army Medical Corps for England with the nominal rank of major, and he was appointed commanding officer of the Harefield Military Hospital, a position which he held for several years. In September 1917 he was transferred to Boulogne, where he was appointed senior physician to the 2nd Australian General Hospital. He was mentioned in despatches in 1917 and served with the Army to March 1918, rising to the rank of lieutenant-colonel, and in January 1918 made full colonel, then returned to Australia in February 1918.

He resumed his duties with the hospital and university in 1918, relinquishing his lectureships in 1920 to allow more time for his medical practice.

== Western Australia interest ==
Around 1880 South Australians Dr. Henry Frederick Harvey, John Richard Young, and the Gibbs brothers, Herbert and George, purchased the Harvey River Station of 12,000 acres (4,900 ha) from Governor Stirling's agents. (The Harvey River is reckoned to have been named for Stirling's friend Sir John Harvey RN, long before the doctor's arrival.) Around 1890 Young withdrew from the partnership and Hayward purchased his share, and the Gibbs brothers withdrew later. Three of Hayward's sons settled in the area, which is now known as the district and township of Harvey.

== Recognition and memberships ==
In 1917 he was created Companion of the Order of Saint Michael and Saint George.

- He was in 1879 a founder of the South Australian branch of the British Medical Association, the first in Australia, and its president for several years. The Federal committee of the BMA awarded him the Association's gold medal in 1914, the first in Australia.
- In 1914 the University of Aberdeen conferred on him the honorary degree of LL.D. Later the same year the University of Adelaide conferred on him the same honorary degree.
- He was for many years a lecturer at Adelaide University and was a member of its council 1900–1924.
- He was Dean of the Faculty of Medicine, University of Adelaide 1922–1923.
- He was the first chairman of the Adelaide Massage Association
- He was founder and first chairman of the Association of Registered Medical Practitioners
- Soon after coming to Adelaide he was appointed an honorary physician at the Adelaide Hospital, and was a member of the board for some years, resigning in December 1913.
- Hayward Street, Harvey, Western Australia was named for him.

== Medical practice ==
- He is recognised as introducing the Thomas splint to Australia.
- In 1898 he made known his conviction that pleural empyema in children was caused by a pneumococcus and the pus could be drained in 24 hours by rib resection.
- He was an enthusiast for venesection in certain circumstances, and worked to promulgate this practice among fellow practitioners.
- He was known as the "Starving Doctor" for his belief that over-feeding of invalids was the cause of many medical problems
- Contrary to the prevailing wisdom seldom gave alcohol to patients.
- He was the author of many clinical papers to the Australian Medical Gazette

== Family ==
Dr. William Thornborough Hayward (26 June 1854 – 21 December 1928) married Florence Burden (13 November 1858 – 19 January 1939) on 26 June 1879. She was a sister of Fred Burden and adopted daughter of J. H. Barrow, founder of The Advertiser. Florence was a published poet and author under her own name and as "Firenze". Their children were:

- Harold Thornborough Hayward (28 March 1880 – 3 September 1942) married Margaret Camilla Lloyd on 6 October 1905 (divorced on grounds of his adultery in December 1923) and had two daughters, Lloyda Marjorie Hayward and Betty Margaret Hayward; served with the 10th Australian Infantry Battalion AIF during WWI, remarried Jean Hogarth on 7 July 1927, died of cancer whilst serving in the 4th Military District Garrison Battalion CMF during WWII
- Dr. Lionel Wykeham Hayward (1881–1926) married Pattie Lawrence on 13 March 1906. She was a daughter of Dr. Alexander Lawrence.
- Roy Oglethorpe Hayward (1883 – ) moved to Western Australia, lived at "Riverton", Harvey.
- Muriel Florence Hayward (1885–1973) married Robert Moore Steele in 1912
- Marjorie Di Hayward (1886–1982) married Herbert Kay in 1913. Marjorie was a talented artist; she illustrated Tales and Tales of Tails and No Tails, one of her mother's books of poems.
- Geoffrey Burden Hayward (1888 – ) moved to Western Australia, was farmer at Harvey.
- Bernard William Hayward (1890–1924) married Hazel Graham in 1923
- Dr. Lancelot Alfred Hayward (1891 – 15 September 1964) served with 3AGH at Gallipoli, married his former sister-in-law Margaret Camilla Hayward in 1924, moved to Western Australia with his wife and stepdaughters/nieces Lloyda and Betty; had a practice at 22 St George's Terrace. Perth.
- John Hartley Hayward (1896 – ) moved to Western Australia, was farmer at Harvey.

They had a home on The Parade, Norwood, then Alexandra Avenue, Rose Park.
