= Florence Hayward =

Australian poet, vegetarian, animal rights activist (1858–1939)

Florence Hayward (13 November 1858 – 19 January 1939), pen name "Firenze", was a South Australian poet.

== History ==
Florence was a daughter of Philip Henry Burden and his wife Mary Burden née Jones, and a sister of Fred Burden. Their father died young and their mother married the founder of The Advertiser, John Henry Barrow, who adopted her children.

She married Dr. William Thornborough Hayward (26 June 1854 – 21 December 1928) on 26 June 1879. Their first child, Harold Thornborough Hayward, was born at Riverton in 1880. In 1882 they moved to Norwood, living on The Parade, where William established himself as a physician. He was appointed Honorary Physician to the Royal Adelaide and lectured at the University of Adelaide. He served in England and France in senior positions and returned to Adelaide as Colonel Hayward CMG.

She was a friend of C. J. Dennis and an occasional guest at his Toolangi, Victoria, home. The book In the Garden of Arden was the product of one such stay.

She has been mentioned as a vegetarian and animal rights activist.

== Publications ==
- Old Blues and Reds and Other Verses Pritchard Bros. 1915 (title poem refers to old scholars of Saints and Princes colleges respectively, going to "the front".)
- The Voice in Rama 1916
- Why the Laughing Jack Laughed illustrated by Esmond George (Rigby 1916)
- The Sunshine Fairies and the Shadow Giants ill. Esmond George (Rigby 1916)
- Vagabond Verses 1924
- The Orchestra of Life
- Farmer Hays and Others
- Ultimate Values Crudely Expressed in Verse: written on the fields of France and Flanders 1914–1918
- Tales and Tales of Tails and No Tails 1920 ill. Marjorie D. Kay
