= Esmond George =

Australian theatre actor, director and art critic (1888–1959)

Robert Esmond George (20 April 1888 – 1959) was an Australian theatre actor and director, mostly remembered as a watercolour artist and newspaper art critic. His wife, professionally known as Elizabeth George, was a well-known journalist.

== Early life and education ==
Robert Esmond George was born in Hamilton, near Kapunda, to John Henry George (c. 1856–1892) and his wife Mary Kate George, née Burton (c. 1854–1922). His father, headmaster of Morgan school, died four years later as the result of a shooting accident. Mary and her family removed to Robert Street, Moonta; later lived at "Oriel", Sea View Road, Kirkcaldy.

George was educated at the Moonta public school,

== Career ==
George was first employed at the Savings Bank branch at Kadina then by 1908 at Kapunda, where he became conductor of the local Glee Club, and performed on stage with songs and recitations. He resigned from the Bank in 1912 and embarked on a successful series of engagements throughout Western Australia with Annie Jones, whom he married in 1916. Annie, originally from outback Western Australia, was a poster artist and storyteller, author of Sandplains. He was also an active artist, and around 1916 supplied illustrations for several story books by "Firenze" (Florence Hayward).

He was associated with the Adelaide Repertory Theatre from 1915 or earlier, initially as an actor and later as stage director. He also appeared in several productions by the Lyric Club at the Chamber of Manufactures Building, Pirie Street. He also appeared with travelling groups "The Revellers", "The New Follies" and "The Tourists" as a fine baritone and humorist. He directed stage productions for students of St Peter's College and from 1932 served as chairman of the WEA Dramatic Company.

He enlisted with the Army Medical Corps in November 1917 and embarked as a private on the SS Gaika for England in August 1918. He returned to Australia in January 1919 aboard SS Leicestershire and discharged as medically unfit.

He worked for a time as a secretary for the Humes Pipe Company at its Loveday works. He then found work as a journalist, notably as arts critic for The Register. He was a clear and fluent writer, as evidenced by his many "letters to the editor".

He developed an interest in poster art, at which his partner Annie was highly proficient. Annie died in 1920 and Esmond remarried six years later. He had several one-man exhibitions of his watercolor paintings and black-and-white illustrations, and also with the United Arts Club. In 1931 he and John Goodchild took to the road on a sketching tour of the Eastern States. He was a popular choice as adjudicator at a wide range of artistic competitions — singing, elocution and painting. He left journalism to become a commercial artist, and in 1934 left for Heatherley Art School in London to further his craft. Nora Heysen was a fellow-passenger on the Aller. While in London he was elected to the prestigious Langham Sketching Club.

He was an adherent of Theosophy, and occasionally gave public lectures on the subject. He was secretary of the Adelaide Theosophical Society in 1919 and represented the organization at anti-war demonstrations. He was hon. secretary for a massive peace demonstration in 1929.

His second wife Elisabeth was a highly regarded journalist with The Advertiser, by-lined "Elizabeth Leigh" from March 1923 then "Elizabeth George" from April 1931. When she left Adelaide to join her husband in Perth, she was farewelled by some of Adelaide's most influential women — Adelaide Miethke, Lady Bonython and representatives of the CWA, Women's Non-party Political Association, Kindergarten Union, MBHA, WCTU, YWCA, and a handful of others. She was later to write a history of Wilderness School, illustrated by her husband. She also wrote two well-received novels: Two at Daly Waters and January and August.

In 1936 he was appointed to Perth's Repertory Club. This organisation was superior to the Adelaide Repertory in several ways: it had its own theatre and clubrooms, and organised a range of entertainments apart from plays, and usually had two productions in rehearsal while one was being staged. Its membership was restricted to 1,000 members and most shows were sold out before opening night, so advertising was seldom necessary.

In late 1939 or early 1940 he joined the 2nd AIF, and served in the Middle-East, sketching and writing articles on the people and culture of Palestine and Egypt for Australian newspapers. He returned to Adelaide, perhaps as an invalid. His baggage included artwork by the deceased Sgt. Kibby VC., which he passed on to Mrs Kibby.

He returned to Adelaide and journalism, and for the next twenty-odd years had weekly by-lined articles in the Sunday Mail, notable for their easy unpretentious style and positive outlook, even for non-representational work, though he had little time for what he called "puzzle pictures". He mounted several one-man shows of his own.

== Other activities ==
George was also a regular and popular volunteer guide and lecturer at the Art Gallery of South Australia.

== Theatre ==
George acted in a large number of plays with the Adelaide Repertory Theatre company (notably as Eilert Lövborg in Hedda Gabler), and directed (A.R.T. except where noted) the following:

- 18 July 1925 You Never Can Tell (G. B. Shaw) at Victoria Hall, Adelaide
- 10 July 1926 Getting Married (G. B. Shaw) at Victoria Hall, Adelaide
- 19 May 1928 Granite (Clemence Dane) at Victoria Hall, Adelaide
- 1 June 1929 Gold (Eugene O'Neill) at Victoria Hall, Adelaide. George read the lead part on account of Basil Harford's sudden illness.
- 24 May 1930 The Touch of Silk (Betty M. Davis) at Australia Theatre, Adelaide
- 18 July 1931 Many Waters (Monckton Hoffe) at Australia Theatre, Angas Street, Adelaide
- 19 March 1932 Lochinvar (H. Winsloe Hall) Elder Conservatorium opera class at Theatre Royal, Adelaide
- 21 May 1932 Michael and Mary (A. A. Milne) at Australia Theatre, Adelaide
- 1 April 1933 Pygmalion (G. B. Shaw) at Australia Theatre, Adelaide

(E. George was away in England studying painting 1934–1935)

- 25 April 1936 Candida (G. B. Shaw) at Stow Hall, Flinders Street, Adelaide
- 15 February 1936 The Late Christopher Bean (René Fauchois) at Stow Hall, Adelaide
- 19 August 1936 A Man's House (John Drinkwater) at Stow Hall, Adelaide

Around this time he founded his own "Esmond George Players" then was appointed director with Perth Repertory Club, and was associated with:

- 9 December 1936 Lovers Leap (Philip Johnson)
- 10 March 1937 Anthony and Anna (St John Ervine) He also painted the scenery.
- 14 April 1937 The Touch of Silk (Betty M. Davis)
- 9 June 1937 As You Desire Me (Pirandello)
- 10 December 1937 Granite (Clemence Dane)

He served as stage manager for other productions, notably The Infernal Machine (Jean Cocteau) in July 1937, and as secretary to the West Australian Drama Festival in 1937.

== Family ==
Esmond Robert George married Annie Robina "Nance" Jones ( – 17 July 1920) in September 1916, and had a home in Blackwood. They had one daughter:

- Helen Hamilton George (23 August 1918 – c. 2012), a ballet enthusiast who served as a WAAF in World War II. She was noted for her impressionistic sketches of dancers, and was the subject of a William Dargie portrait.

In 1926 he married again, to Elisabeth Mildred "Bessie" Baker ( – 9 May 1953), a journalist with The Advertiser. They had a home "Dinton", at Fife Avenue, Torrens Park. They had no further children.
