= John White (South Australian painter) =

South Australian painter and pharmaceutical chemist

John White (4 July 1854 – 8 January 1943) was a South Australian painter and pharmacist.

== History ==
White was born in Bath, England to Ellen White (née Ford) and John White. He trained as a pharmacist in Bristol then, under engagement to E. S. Wigg, who operated a pharmacy in conjunction with his bookshop on Rundle Street, Adelaide, emigrated to South Australia on the SS Torrens, arriving on 12 January 1878. He later set up his own chemist's shop in Rundle Street, Kent Town, which in the 1880s became J. White & Sons Pty Ltd. He was also in partnership with Philip John Evans as chemists of The Parade, Norwood until April 1888. He purchased the retail arm of F. H. Faulding & Co., and set up pharmacies in Graves Street, Kadina from 1919, operated by his son H. G. White, and at Port Lincoln. He sold his Kent Town business and purchased Eyre's pharmacy at 98 O'Connell Street, North Adelaide, notable as pharmacists to the Governor of South Australia. He later moved his pharmacy into the Verco Building on the corner of North Terrace and Stevens Place in the city of Adelaide.

White was closely associated with the foundation of the Pharmaceutical Society of South Australia. He was also on the advisory committee which established the Food and Drugs Act of 1908 enacted by the Parliament of South Australia. He was one of the founding Society members appointed by the Governor to form the Pharmacy Board of South Australia following The Pharmacy Act of 1935 which restricted the use of the title 'pharmaceutical chemist'.

He was a member of George Brookman's original Coolgardie Goldmining Prospecting Company Limited, and made a fortune in the gold mines of Western Australia. He retired in 1899, leaving W. J. Burton as manager of the business.

== Painting ==
White was inspired to take up painting influenced by his cousin Dr Wheeler of Reigate (Surrey) who exhibited at the Royal Academy in London. At the age of 21 he traveled throughout Wales on a painting expedition. He was highly respected as a fine amateur painter and connoisseur, judge and lecturer.

By 1877 he was a well-known artist in South Australia and had exhibited regularly. He was awarded a prize in the Jubilee Exhibition and the Melbourne Exhibition of 1880. He was a founding member of the Adelaide Easel Club in 1892 and its treasurer from 1899. He studied with James Ashton and was friends with Hans Heysen. His "Land of the Salt Bush" was one of his most recognised oil paintings.

White was a public figure in Adelaide and well known. Around this time John White lived in 'Leighton' in Collinswood. He later moved to a large home called 'Conara' in Bellevue Place, Unley Park.

White joined the South Australian Society of Arts when the two clubs merged in 1901 and served as its president 1911–1914; 1919–1921 and 1923–1927. He was a member of the Board of Governors of the South Australian Institute (which included the Public Library, Museum and Art Gallery) and president of the council, S.A. School of Arts and Crafts 1926–1928.

Works held by the Art Gallery of South Australia

- Land of the salt bush 1898
- From the Sand Dunes 1899
- Near the Pioneer's Anchorage, Nepean Bay, Kangaroo Island 1908
- Swamp Lands 1908

Selected works

These are some works which were praised by contemporary media:

- Torrens Lake at Sunrise 1888
- Joy cometh in the morning 1901
- Where the Mallee Grows 1902
- Where Ti-trees Bend 1903
- The Great North Land 1905
- Springtime 1906
- The Pioneer's Anchorage, Nepean Bay, Kangaroo Island 1908
- The Golden Hour pastel 1910
- Sunset, Nepean Bay pastel 1912

He continued into old age to paint and exhibit fine works, but was no longer selected for special comment by newspaper critics.

== Other interests ==
He was on the board of management of the Adelaide Hospital.

== Family ==
On 24 August 1882, John White married Katherine Isabella "Kate" Brookman (1857 – 2 November 1893), the second daughter of Benjamin Brookman of Parkside, South Australia, and sister of Sir George Brookman. She died shortly after giving birth to their fourth son, Clifford George White, who died in infancy. Their children include

- Leslie Ford White (4 December 1884 – 1963)Educated at Hahndorf College; Married Violet Hasheen Hall (1885–1971) on 21 June 1904; they divorced in 1921. Children: Ford Brookman White (1907–1908); Robert Hansard White (1909–1994); Andrew John Ross White (1916–1977) Leslie Ford White's Second marriage: Alexandra Helen De Moleyns (1896–1963) Children from this marriage: Jack Douglas White (1918–1998); Mary Agnes White (born 1931, died 2011)
- Alfred John White (17 October 1886 – 5 March 1970) Educated at Hahndorf College; later worked for the Bank of Adelaide. Married Doris Owen Dolans (1893–1984). They had one daughter: Jean Brookman White (1918–2010).
- Howard Gordon White (24 October 1889 – 1972) pharmacist residing on Melbourne Street, North Adelaide. Married Myra Myrtle Louise Chittleborough (1893–1992). Their children include John Carew Howard Gordon White (1915–2008); Rodney Gordon White (1923–2005); Dorothy Helen White (1926–1926)
- Mildred Stella *Katherine "Katie" White (8 September 1891 – 30 September 1913)
- Clifford George White (6 September 1893 – 11 November 1893), who died five weeks after his mother.

In 1895 White married again, to Helen Georgina Nicholson (1873 – 25 April 1918), of Melbourne, the daughter of Matthew R. Nicholson (1832–1866) and Catherine Nicholson, née Brookman (1831–1922), Katherine Isabella "Kate" Brookman's maternal first cousin. The marriage took place at "Tranmere", 37 Bryson Street, Canterbury, Melbourne, Victoria. Their children include:

- Dr Alan Hubert White MBBS (18 May 1896 – 1950, Adelaide) — medical practitioner educated at Prince Alfred College and the University of Adelaide. Married Aileen Blanche Mildred Peachey (1898–1982)
- Wilfred Neil White (11 December 1899 – 1949, Adelaide) — married Kitty Alexa Hill (1900–1982)
- Helen Audrey "Audrey" White (1 November 1903 – 1968) — Western Australia; married Harry William Starling (1900–1971)
- Catherine Dorothy White (20 June 1905 – 1982, Horton, Newcastle upon Tyne, England) — married Dr Edward Cyril Vardy MBE (1903–1974)
