= George Brookman =

South Australian businessman (1850–1927)

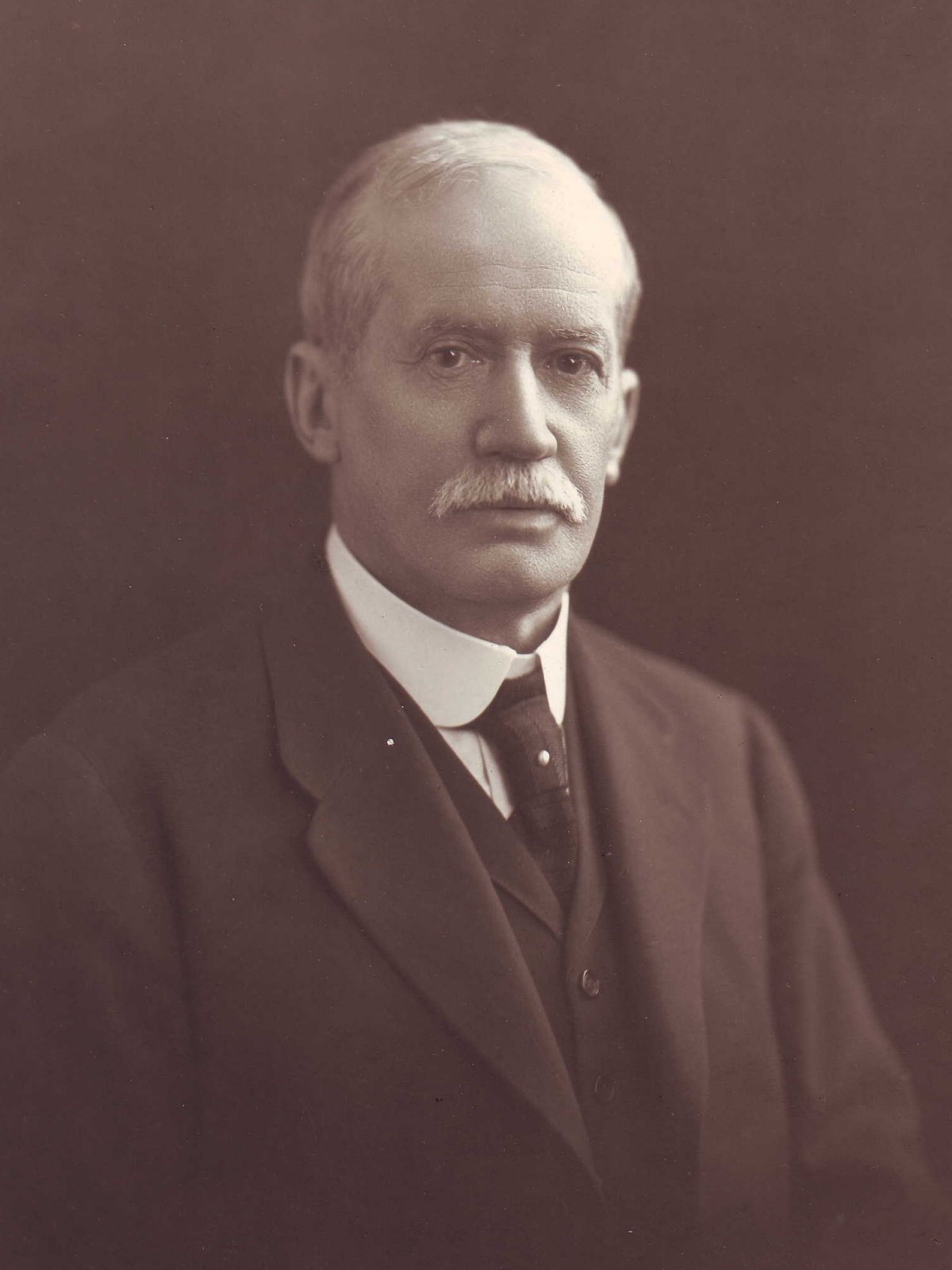
Sir George Brookman c.1920

Sir George Brookman KBE (15 April 1850 – 20 June 1927) was a South Australian businessman who made a fortune from a gold discovery in Western Australia, and is remembered as a generous benefactor of the South Australian School of Mines and Industries and the University of Adelaide.

== History ==
Brookman was born on 15 April 1850 in Glasgow, Scotland, the eldest son of typesetter Benjamin Brookman (16 September 1826 – 11 June 1917) and his wife Jane née Wilson (d. 1 March 1881). The family emigrated to South Australia in 1852 on the Water Lily, arriving at Port Adelaide on 5 May and settled in Prospect. After completing his education at the schools of James Bath and R. C. Mitton, he found employment with grocery firm D & J Fowler. Then, with fellow-employee William Finlayson jun., he took over Fowler's retail arm in King William Street. He set himself up as a stock and share broker and earned a position in the Adelaide Stock Exchange in 1890.

In 1893 he founded, with brother William Brookman and Sam Pearce, the Coolgardie Gold Mining and Prospecting Co. Ltd. syndicate which financed the exploration and proving of a mining lease "Ivanhoe" in Kalgoorlie, Western Australia, in what was later dubbed the "Golden Mile" and made its backers incredibly wealthy. The syndicate owed its success to dogged determination in the face of criticism from experts, as the mineral was in a form that had not been encountered before and through "Brookman's extraordinarily skilful financial transactions and able administration".

He stood successfully for the Central District vacancy in South Australia's Legislative Council in 1901 caused by the resignation of Charles Kingston, who took up a seat in the new Federal Parliament. He was re-elected, but did not stand for the elections of 1910.

== Business activities ==
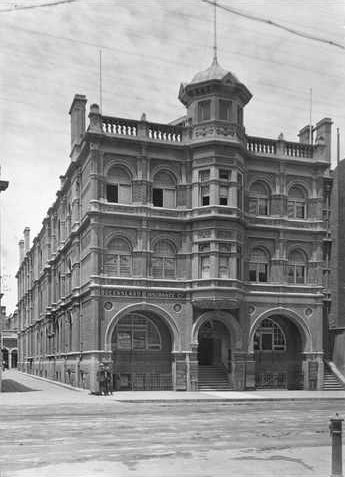
Brookman Building, Grenfell Street, c. 1907; to the left is Commercial Street

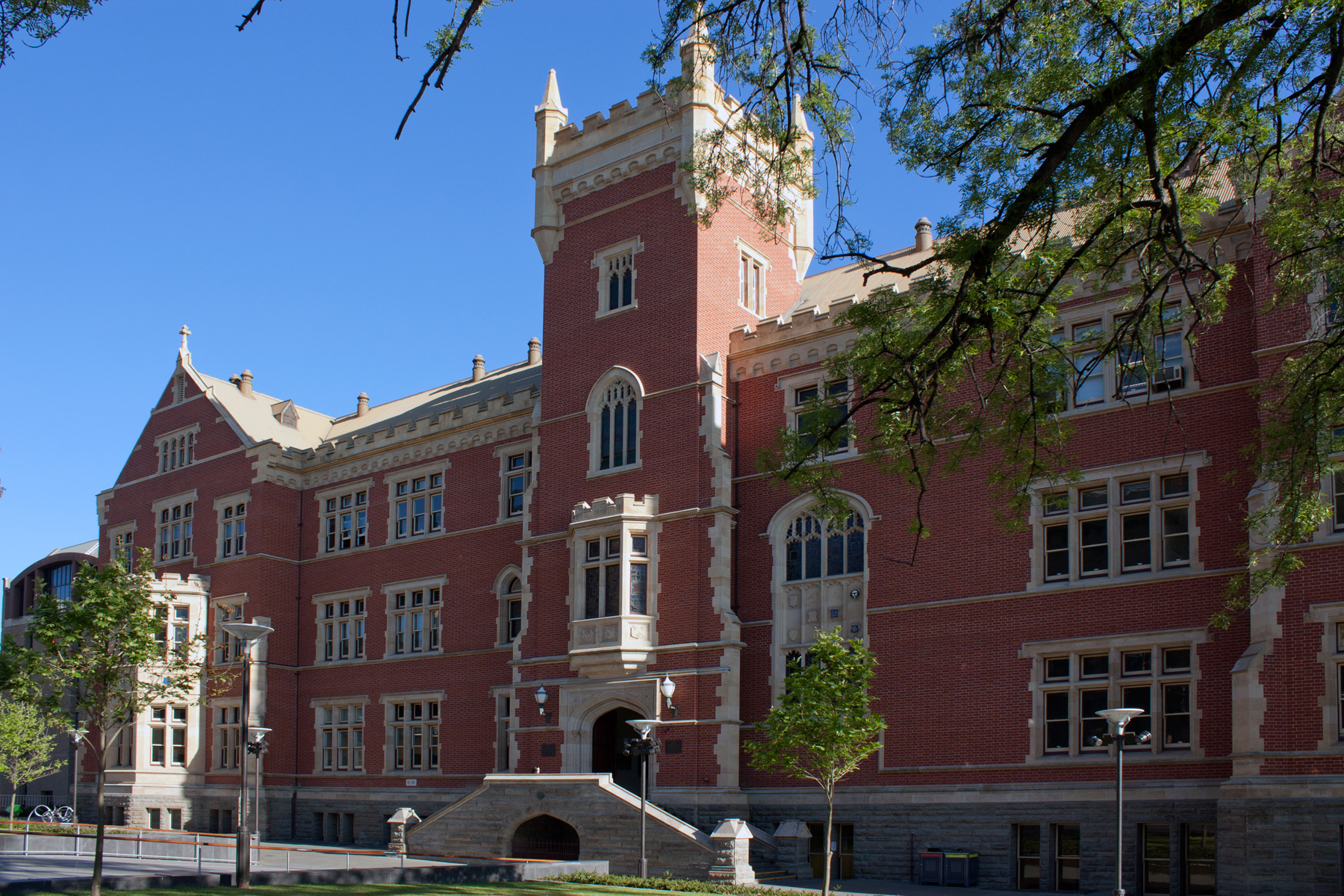
UniSA City East Campus, which incorporates Brookman Hall (c. 1903).

- In 1896 he commissioned a four-storey block of offices "Brookman Building(s)" at 35 Grenfell Street, Adelaide, previously the site of the Commercial Hotel. The architect was Alfred Wells. Included was an auction room costing £30,000 available to the wool dealers at £100 for 12 days' use each year.
- He was chairman from 1898 to 1922 of the South Australian Electric Light and Motive Power Company and its successor, the Adelaide Electric Supply Company.
- He was a director of the Bank of Adelaide.
- He was a director of the Mintaro Slate Company.

== Public works ==
- He was a member of the North Adelaide Congregational Church, and for many years Finance Secretary of the Congregational Union.
- He gave £15,000 towards the eventual £50,000 cost of the School of Mines and Industries building on the Frome Road corner of North Terrace. The School had been housed in the Jubilee Exhibition Building (which was adjacent on the west side, and is now the site of the University of Adelaide's Ligertwood and Napier buildings), but had long since outgrown the space available to it.

A feature of the building is the great stained-glass windows in Brookman Hall, locally produced by E. F. Troy, celebrating the British Empire, and those to the south of the building, adjacent the stairway, made by the firm of H. L. Vosz, depicting British scientists and technologists Watt, Newton, Stephenson, Bessemer, Kelvin, Faraday, Wren and Dalton.

- He gave practical support to the University of Adelaide and was for many years a member of its council.
- He was also strongly associated with the Adelaide Children's Hospital.
- He was involved with various patriotic movements, especially during the Great War: the State Repatriation Board, the Red Cross Society, the Anzac Hospitality Committee, and other organisations with similar aims.

== Recognition ==
- The large assembly hall of the School of Mines building, for which he contributed so generously, was named for him, as colloquially has the building itself.
- He was knighted (KBE) on 19 October 1920 for his "Services during the War" to the State, the Commonwealth, and the Empire.

== Family ==
=== Parents ===
George's mother Jane died on 1 March 1881.

His father, Benjamin (ca.1827 – 11 June 1917), then married Charlotte Elizabeth Ragless (ca.1847 – 1945) on 27 September 1883. Charlotte Elizabeth was the eldest daughter of John Ragless (ca.1815 – 27 May 1899)

Their home was "Kelvin Lodge", (perhaps 3 Daphne St.) Prospect. After the death of her husband, Charlotte Elizabeth lived with her daughter Charlotte Evelyn "Lottie" Botten.

=== Siblings ===
Children of Benjamin and Jane included

- George Brookman (15 April 1850 – 20 June 1927), the subject of this article
- Benjamin (Joseph) (ca.1855 – 22 May 1932) married Lillian Alice Augusta (August?) Hassall ( – 13 May 1930) on 29 January 1878.
- William Gordon (ca.1860 – 5 January 1910)
- James ( – ) moved to California
- Lillian ( – ) married Benjamin Edward Ragless (3rd son of John Ragless, born ca.1851) on 12 December 1878
- Katherine Isabella "Kate" Brookman ( – 2 November 1893) married John White of Kent Town on 24 August 1882 (son Howard Gordon White born 24 October 1893).

Children of Benjamin and Charlotte Elizabeth included

- John Ragless Brookman (5 June 1885 – 1971) married Elsie Elizabeth Parker (ca.1885 – 10 June 1919) on 22 March 1910
- Charlotte Evelyn "Lottie" ( – 13 June 1945) married Norman Leonard Botten ( – ) on 26 December 1914

=== Family of George Brookman ===
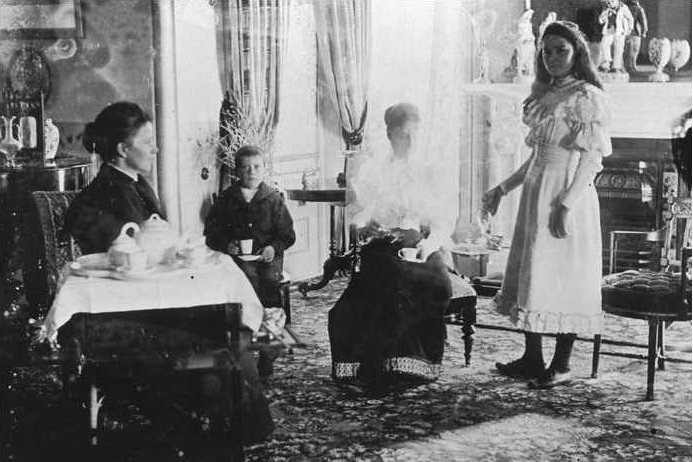
Afternoon Tea at the Brookmans’, c.1895. L-to-R: Mrs. Brookman, Norman, Miss Ada Crossley and May

He married Eliza Martha Marshall (10 February 1859 – 26 January 1931) at St Kilda, Victoria on 13 February 1878.
Their children included:

- Alice May Brookman (18 May 1879 – ) married (Sir) Thomas George Wilson M.B. on 4 June 1902. They divorced in 1920.
- George Wilson Brookman (11 August 1881 – ) married Mary "Polly" Shiels on 23 August 1915
- (Harry) Norman Brookman (22 January 1884 – 26 April 1949) married Ada Mary Dorothy "Nan" Burden (24 April 1889 – 1975) on 6 March 1912. Nan was the elder daughter of Fred Burden.

- Their son, David Norman Brookman (24 March 1917 – 22 May 2000) was elected to the House of Assembly seat of Alexandra in 1948 for the LCL and held it until 1973.

- Howard Brookman (6 June 1886 – )

Their home was either "Craigmellon" at 3 Edwin Terrace, Gilberton, or "Ivanhoe" at 9 Edwin Terrace. He died on 27 June 1927 at "Blair Athol", Avenel Gardens, Medindie. He was survived by his wife, his daughter, and two of his sons.
