= Norman Brookman =

Australian politician

Harry Norman Brookman (22 January 1884 – 26 April 1949) was a farmer and politician in South Australia.

== History ==
Norman was born at Medindie, South Australia, the second son of Eliza Martha (née Marshall; 1859–1931) and George Donald Brookman (1840–1927). His father was an MLC in South Australia, while an uncle, William Gordon Brookman, was an MLC in Western Australia and Mayor of Perth.

He was a student at Roseworthy College, and during the war of 1914–1918 served in France as a gunner with the 42nd battery, 11th Brigade Field Artillery. He developed a model farm "Burbrook", near Meadows, and was involved in sheep breeding, apple growing and experimented with commercial flax growing. He was involved with the Waite Research Institute in other field trials on his property. His was vitally interested in pastures, and experimented with various grasses and clovers.

He was a councillor and chairman of the District Council of Willunga from 1924 to 1929, and was chairman of the District Council of Meadows from 1933 to 1935. He served on the Hills Firefighting and Prevention Committee.

He and Jack Bice, both sons of ex-MLC knights, were Liberal and Country League candidates for the Southern district seats in the Legislative Council in 1941, and both were successful. Bice retired in 1959, but Norman Brookman was killed in 1949 when the car he was driving home from Victor Harbor crashed head-on into a 4-ton truck around 2 miles (3.2 km) south of Noarlunga.

== Family ==
He married Ada Mary Dorothy "Nan" Burden (24 April 1889 – 1975) on 6 March 1912. She was a daughter of Frederic Britten Burden and Ada Burden, née Hallett (c. 1851 – 26 March 1927), later Mrs. Thomas Duffield of Mount Lofty, and has been named "Dorothy Britten Burden".

- Anthony Brookman (1914 – )
- David Norman Brookman (24 Mar 1917 – 22 May 2000) was an M.P. for Alexandra from 1948 to 1973.
- Nigel Peter Brookman (1920 – )
- Elizabeth Charmian Brookman (1922 – )
