= William Storrie =

Businessman and politician in the early days of the colony of South Australia

William Storrie (c. 1832 − 19 June 1900), pen name Saunders McTavish, was a businessman and politician in the early days of the colony of South Australia.

== Early life ==
William Storrie was the third son of James Storrie of Glasgow, Scotland. He emigrated to South Australia in 1849 with brother James (ca.1829 – 16 July 1897) and sister Helen (died 25 November 1875).

== Business ==
Storrie went into business for himself, then around 1864 brought in his brother James to found the firm of W & J Storrie, agents, later wholesale hardware merchants of 19 Currie Street, Adelaide. He withdrew from active participation in the company but retained a financial interest. It was converted to a limited liability company, with brother-in-law W. T. Tassie appointed as manager.

== Writing ==
Between 1867 and 1870 Storrie contributed humorous articles in Scots dialect (as "Saunders McTavish") to The Adelaide Advertiser. They were published in book form in 1874.

== Politics ==
Storrie was elected a member of the Legislative Council in 1871, and retained his seat until 1878.

== Personal life and death ==
Storrie married Jane McKenzie (died 30 November 1915 in Edinburgh, Scotland) on 14 June 1859. They had no children.

He left for England in 1897 and died in Barking, Essex on 19 June 1900.

== William Storrie Jnr ==
Around 1909, number 195 Rundle Street, Adelaide, was occupied by "W. Storrie and Company, Importers of British & Foreign Merchandise", next door to furnishing retailer Malcolm Reid & Co.. William Storrie's brother James had a son called William, who in 1897 "associated with Messrs. J. Darling and Son, and has for many years been one of the most prominent members of the Literary Societies Union", so this may have been his business.
