= George Stevenson (Australian politician) =

Australian politician

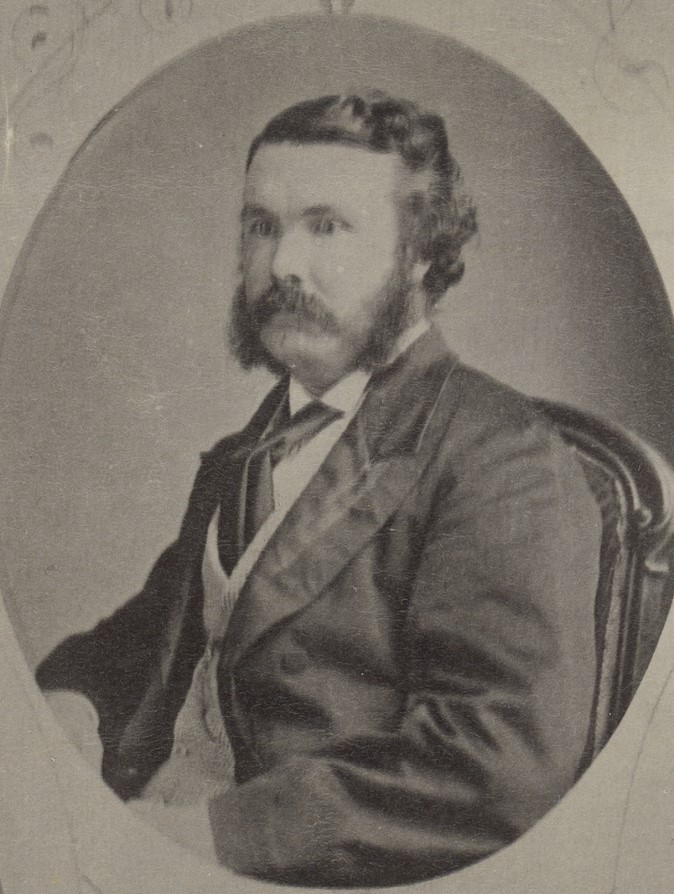
George John William Stevenson (1839–1893) South Australian journalist and politician

George John William Stevenson (7 May 1839 – 27 August 1893) was a lawyer, journalist and politician in the British colony of South Australia.

== History ==
George was born the son of George Stevenson of the Register, who emigrated aboard HMS Buffalo with Governor Hindmarsh as part of the First Fleet of South Australia.

He was appointed a clerk in the Police Commissioner's office in 1857, then studied law and worked as an articled clerk to John George Daly ( – 21 May 1881), second son of Sir Dominick Daly. In March 1868 he applied for admission to the Bar.

He was a member of the South Australian House of Assembly for East Torrens from December 1871 to February 1875. He served as Attorney-General in Sir Henry Ayers' cabinet from March 1872 to July 1873. He was appointed J.P. in 1872.

He began his journalistic career as sub-editor with The Advertiser then was, around 1874, appointed the first editor of The Lantern, a satirical magazine later taken over by Quiz. In April 1876, F. S. Carroll took over the Lantern; Stevenson left Adelaide to join the staff of the Sydney Morning Herald, and was for many years on the literary staff of the Evening News and the Town and Country Journal. For the last three years of his life he was connected with the Australian Star, and was known as a conscientious journalist, a vigorous and incisive political writer, and a competent dramatic critic and reviewer. He suffered ill health the last four years of his life.

== Family ==
George married Jeanie (or Jeannie) Miller Davidson ( – 15 September 1916) of Little Para on 17 March 1863. They may have had only one child:

- Lucy Margaret Stevenson (23 January 1864 – 14 July 1932) was a well-known soprano, a featured artist at many society functions and charity events in Adelaide. She never married, and spent much of her life caring for her mother.
