= Fred Burden =

Australian newspaper editor (1852–1897)

Frederic Britten Burden (1852 – 30 January 1897) was a businessman and newspaper editor in the colony of South Australia.

== History ==
Burden was born in England, the second son of Philip Henry Burden (c. 1823 – 3 March 1864), and emigrated to South Australia with his parents when a young child, sometime before 1854, perhaps on Gipsy, which arrived in September 1853. His father worked briefly for Goode Brothers, sold drapery from his Norwood home, then was secretary for the Adelaide Advertiser, and headed its commercial section until his early death.

Fred Burden was educated at St. Peter's College, and worked at the warehouse of Whyte, Counsell, & Co. He then spent some years in England. His mother Mary remarried on 15 August 1865 to John H. Barrow (1817–1874), who adopted her children, and had a son of their own. Barrow had founded The Advertiser with C. H. Goode in July 1858, and served as editor until his death in 1874. Ownership of The Advertiser was then in the hands of the widow Barrow and Thomas King (1833–1886). In 1879 Mary retired in favor of her son Fred, then J. Langdon Bonython joined the firm, but retaining the business name of Barrow & King. In 1884 King sold out to his partners, and some years afterwards Burden sold his share to Bonython and retired to Kent, then to "Congelow", Malvern, Worcestershire, where he died on 30 January 1897, leaving a widow and two children.

== Family ==
He married Ada Hallett (c. 1851 – 26 March 1927) on 20 May 1879 Their children included:

- Ada Mary Dorothy "Nan" Burden (21 April 1889 – 1975) married (Harry) Norman Brookman (22 January 1884 – 26 April 1949) on 6 March 1912. She was born at Hutt Street, Adelaide; he was the younger son of George Brookman and was a member of the South Australian Legislative Council from 1941 to 1949, when he was killed in a car crash near Noarlunga.

- Their son, David Norman Brookman (24 March 1917 – 22 May 2000) was elected to the House of Assembly seat of Alexandra in 1948 for the LCL and held it until 1973.

- Mary Burden (24 October 1891 – ) born in England, married David Wilkie on 14 August 1912, lived in New Zealand.

Ada married again, to Thomas Duffield ISO (c. 1849 – 11 February 1937) on 27 April 1904; they lived at Mount Lofty; she died at Ruthven Mansions, Adelaide.

Siblings

Fred's siblings, who were also adopted by Barrow included:

- Philip Henry Burden, Jr. (1851 – 5 October 1902), the eldest adopted son, married Rachel Ann English (died 23 August 1940) on 25 February 1875. She was a daughter of Thomas English.
- Annie Burden (1854–)
- Florence Burden (13 November 1858 – 19 January 1939) married Dr. William Thornborough Hayward (26 June 1854 – 21 December 1928) on 26 June 1879. Florence, also writing as "Firenze", was a published author.
