= Park Laurie =

Australian politician

James Park Dawson Laurie
- Born: 1846; Kangatong Station, near Warrnambool, Victoria, Australia
- Died: 2 December 1928 (aged 81–82); Naracoorte, South Australia
- Other name: Park Laurie
- Occupations: Pastoralist, politician
- Years active: 1870–1929
- Office: Member of the South Australian House of Assembly
- Spouse: Dora Kean (m. 1882–1919)
- Children: Park Alexander McEdward Laurie; Daphne Mary Jessie Laurie; Lily Laurel Nicol Laurie; Dorothy Annie Laurie
- Parent(s): Rev. Alexander Laurie; Janet Nicol Laurie

James Park Dawson Laurie (1846 – 2 December 1928), generally known as "Park Laurie", was a pastoralist and politician in the colony of South Australia.

== History ==
Laurie was born at Kangatong station, near Warrnambool, Victoria, the third son of the (Presbyterian) Rev. Alexander Laurie (c. 1817 – 5 February 1854).

The Rev. Laurie, of Covington, Lanarkshire, and his wife Janet Laurie, née Nicol, (c. 1822 – 25 July 1903) had been sent out to Portland, Victoria to establish a church there in 1841. In 1842, he founded a Presbyterian school, run by J. S. Stewart.

In 1848 Rev. Laurie left the church and founded the Portland Herald, of which he was sole proprietor and editor, making a few enemies in the process. The Portland Herald and Belfast and Warrnambool Advocate (to give its full name) folded in 1855. Sons Andrew and Park were educated in Portland and later learnt much of the art of printing.

The widowed Janet Laurie and her four sons moved to Gambierton (now Mount Gambier) and set about founding a newspaper, The Border Watch, whose first issue came out on 26 April 1861 as a 4-page, single broadsheet weekly. John Watson (ca.1842 – 13 December 1925), another Scotsman and later Mount Gambier's first mayor, joined in 1863 as editor, and he and A. F. Laurie, as publisher, managed the company for the next 50 years.

Park divested himself of his share of the newspaper around 1870 and took up pastoral leases at Charkut Station and Laurie Park, and purchased Mailman Station on the Lower Darling, in partnership with his brother-in-law, A. McEdward, of Melbourne.

He was elected to the South Australian House of Assembly seat of Victoria on two occasions and sat from 14 April 1870 to 6 December 1871 and 29 May 1873 to 21 February 1875. He had two colleagues for the first term: William Paltridge and (briefly) Neville Blyth. In his second stint his colleague was T. Wilde Boothby.

In 1882 he married Dora Kean; they spent the next two years touring the world: Switzerland, the Netherlands, Austria, Turkey, Italy, England and America. On their return, he purchased Tallageira station and built a new house there, where they lived for several years before moving to "Laurie Park" on the Mosquito Plains. He sold all his properties and lived in Naracoorte for a year or two, then took up land at Cadgee, where they lived for eighteen months before again returning to Naracoorte. When Kybybolite Station was subdivided, he took up a block which he named "Eurinima", built a house and operated a mixed farm, living there until his death.

== Other interests ==
He was admitted to the Mount Gambier Lodge of Freemasons shortly after its establishment in 1867, and was in 1925 its longest serving member.

He was first elected to the Narracoorte District Council in 1889 and served for 35 years as a member, including 28 years as Chairman, retiring in 1929.

He was keenly interested in horse racing and an owner of several good jumpers. His Cuttlefish won the Oakbank Hurdle Race twice, and Guardfish which won the Warrnambool Grand National Hurdles Race and ran second in the Grand National Hurdle Race of 1885. His Echo won a number of flat races. He was for many years a steward and judge of the Narracoorte Racing Club.

He died at the Naracoorte hospital, at 82 years, the then-oldest ex-member of the South Australian House of Assembly.

== Family ==
Children of Rev. Alexander (c. 1817–1854) and Janet Laurie, née Nicol, (c. 1822–1903) were:

- Alexander John Sutherland Gammell Laurie (2 March 1842 – )
- Andrew Frederick Laurie (1843 – 11 September 1920) married Emily Barrow (c. 1845 – 29 May 1939) on 20 February 1868, lived "Calula".

- Frederick John Laurie (18 March 1871 – 24 October 1946) married Elizabeth ( – 10 November 1944)

- Alexandrina Jessie Laurie (birth reg. as Alexandrina Jane Lawrie – Victoria Reg. 1851/9411)(1851– 3 September 1900) married Alex. McEdward (6 February 1839, Alvie, Inverness-shire Sct.– 25 July 1894) of "Wrattanbullie", Mosquito Plains (near Naracoorte), on 22 December 1870, lived at "Mildura", Barkers Road, Kew, Victoria.
- Bunyan Harcourt Laurie (c. 1848 – 10 August 1914) acted as overseer for J. P. D. Laurie
- James Park Dawson Laurie (c. 1846 – 2 December 1928) married Dora Kean (c. 1863 – 26 January 1919) of Portland at "Laurie Park" on 13 July 1882. Their children included:

- Park Alexander McEdward Laurie (13 November 1883 – ) served at Gallipoli with the 3rd Light Horse regiment, then with the Egyptian Expeditionary Force, promoted to Captain in 1915, Major in 1916, but repatriated and discharged in 1917 as not suited to command. He married Doris Thornhill Berry on 6 March 1921.
- Daphne Mary Jessie Laurie (1886– )
- Lily Laurel Nicol Laurie (1889– )
- Dorothy Annie "Dora" Laurie (1895– )

- Alex J. Laurie (c. 1856 – 23 May 1917) on the staff of The Border Watch

The widow Janet Lawrie, a woman of culture and attainment, married a second time, to Joshua Black and settled at "Corkhill", Bridgewater, near Portland, Victoria.
