= 1871 South Australian colonial election =

- 14 December−27 December 1871

All seats in the South Australian House of Assembly
- Results by electoral district for the House of Assembly

Colonial elections were held in South Australia from 14 December to 27 December 1871. All 36 seats in the South Australian House of Assembly were up for election.

The instability of government became worse in this brief period. The Strangways government which was in office at the 1870 election lasted less than a month before tensions in the government and the Assembly forced a re-shuffle. Eighteen days later, he was defeated by John Hart, who was defeated after a year in office. His replacement, Arthur Blyth, promptly sought and achieved a dissolution of the Assembly. After less than two years from the 1870 election, the voters were again asked to judge the members of parliament.

Since the inaugural 1857 election, no parties or solid groupings had been formed, which resulted in frequent changes of the Premier. If for any reason the incumbent Premier of South Australia lost sufficient support through a successful motion of no confidence at any time on the floor of the house, he would tender his resignation to the Governor of South Australia, which would result in another member deemed to have the support of the House of Assembly being sworn in by the Governor as the next Premier.

Informal groupings began and increased government stability occurred from the 1887 election. The United Labor Party would be formed in 1891, while the National Defence League would be formed later in the same year.

== See also ==
- Premier of South Australia
