= Robert Cottrell =

Australian politician

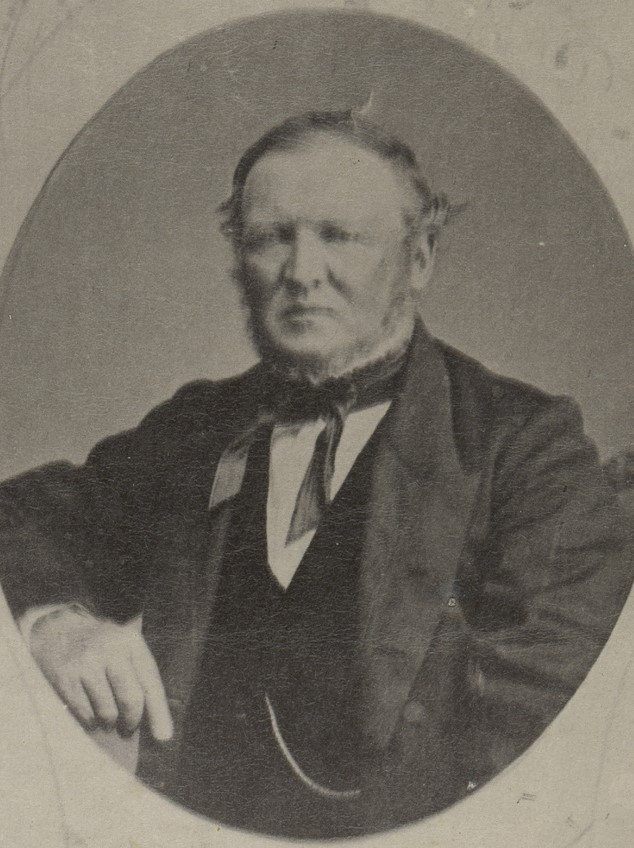

Robert Cottrell (15 September 1815 – 3 November 1880) was a coachbuilder and politician in the colony of South Australia. His first sojourn in Australia was in Maitland, New South Wales and his last near Maitland, South Australia.

== History ==
Cottrell emigrated to New South Wales, arriving in Sydney on the ship Orient in February 1839. He ran a coachbuilding business in Maitland, New South Wales from 1843 to 1845. Cottrell married Abina Ledsam; their two elder sons were born in Maitland, where various members of the Ledsam family had settled from the early 1830s including poundkeeper John Ledsam and auctioneer Jeremiah Ledsam, with whom he was closely associated.

Cottrell, his wife and four children moved to Adelaide by the brig Phantom, accompanied by brother-in-law John Ledsam (1785–1856), in June 1847. In 1848 he opened a coachbuilding business in Rundle Street, which prospered, enabling him to move several times, finally to Grenfell Street.

He was member for East Adelaide in the South Australian House of Assembly April 1868 – February 1875, and was a protectionist. In 1875, he stood again for East Adelaide, but was defeated by William Kay.

He purchased a farm "Brook Cottage", Woodforde, near Magill around 1865, where they lived, and later moved to a much larger property at Urania, some 9 miles (14 km) from Maitland, South Australia.

He had been an invalid for some time, and died of bronchitis.

=== G. T. Cottrell ===
His eldest son George Thomas Cottrell joined the second ("relief") party of B. T. Finniss's surveying expedition to Adam Bay in the Northern Territory as a labourer, leaving Port Adelaide on 29 October 1864. He brought with him six rabbits, a gift of land agent Samuel Pearce, later his father-in-law, but there is no record of their being released, and they certainly failed to "be fruitful and multiply". Although his contract would not expire until October 1865, he was one of those who on 6 May 1865 left Escape Cliffs on the ship Bengal for Surabaya, and with J. R. (T. R. ?) Atkinson travelled on to Singapore, while the rest transshipped via Douglas to Melbourne, and thence to Adelaide.

In the prosecution of W. P. Auld for having on 8 September 1864 shot dead a defenceless Aboriginal man, the Government's case relied on testimony from two witnesses, and had to be dropped after one witness (F. J. Packard) drowned, and the other left the country. It is possible the second witness was Atkinson, who appears never to have returned to Australia. He died of smallpox in India sometime around June 1868

While in Singapore he found a shipmaster's wallet, and was able to return it to its owner, who treated him to a passage to Hong Kong. There he was introduced to the Governor, Sir Richard Graves MacDonnell, who found an appointment for him with the Customs Department in Canton. Two years later he returned to Adelaide, married, and had a successful career as an accountant.

== Family ==
Robert Cottrell married Abina Ledsam (c.1813 – 30 May 1890) around 1838. Among their children were:

- George Thomas Cottrell (c. 1839 – 14 December 1917) was a student at Adelaide Educational Institution, married Sarah Pearce (c. 1842 – 28 September 1930) on 21 August 1869
- Thomas Ledsam Cottrell (1841–), also an AEI student, married Martha Rebecca Galway on 1 January 1861.

- Abina Ledsam Cottrell (1863–1928) married David Halliday Irving

- Robert Cottrell ( – ) married Jane Lowe on 25 December 1865

- George Edwin Cottrell (1868– )
- Isabella Roberta Cottrell (1870– ) married George Lionel Throssell in 1896
- Fanny Ethel Cottrell (1873– )

- Frederick William Cottrell (1851– ) lived at Maitland, South Australia; had falling out with brother Robert. He was subsequently admitted to the Lunatic Asylum declared bankrupt, and the sole executor of his mother's Will.

Both G. T. Cottrell and T. L. Cottrell were born in Maitland, New South Wales.
