= Thomas Wilde Boothby =

Australian politician

Thomas Wilde Boothby (9 December 1839 – 19 June 1885), generally known by his full name, or as "T. Wilde Boothby", was a politician in the British colony of South Australia.

== History ==
Boothby was born the seventh son of Benjamin Boothby (1803–1868) and most likely named for his father's friend and benefactor Thomas Wilde, 1st Baron Truro. He worked as a commission agent and auctioneer.

He and his brother James Henry Boothby took up a lease on a property on the Coorong which they named Tintinara.

He was a member of the South Australian House of Assembly seat of Victoria from June 1873 to February 1875.

He moved from Naracoorte to Strathalbyn around 1873 and to Adelaide in 1874. His wife and two sons left Australia in January 1874. In 1878 he was declared insolvent.

He is perhaps best remembered as father of Guy Boothby (1867–1907) private secretary to Adelaide mayor Lewis Cohen, traveller and author with a significant career in England, and of Ben Boothby (1870– ), artist and companion on Guy's journeys, and also a writer of popular fiction, who completed several of his brother's unfinished stories, and illustrated others. He was by profession a land agent in Bloomsbury, London.

== Family ==
Thomas Wilde Boothby married Mary Agnes Hodding (1843 – 16 July 1907) on 10 March 1864. Their family included:

- Guy Newell Boothby (13 October 1867 – 26 February 1907) private secretary to mayor, successful author in England. He also he wrote libretti for two comic operas Sylvia (1890, Adelaide) and The Jonquil (1891).
- Benjamin "Ben" Boothby (28 January 1870 – ), companion on Guy's journeys, was also a writer of popular fiction, and completed several of his brother's unfinished stories. and illustrated others. He was in business land agent of Bloomsbury, London.
- youngest son Robert Cecil Boothby (7 July 1872 – ) married Constance Ellen Miall ( – ) on 2 June 1906. He was stockbroker of Sydenham, Kent.

== See also ==
- Hundred of Boothby
