= The Advertiser (Adelaide) =

Newspaper in Adelaide, South Australia

- The Duke and Duchess of Cambridge on front page of The Advertiser on 23 July 2013
- Type: Daily newspaper
- Format: Tabloid (since November 1997)
- Owner: Advertiser Newspapers (News Corp Australia)
- Founder: Rev John Henry Barrow
- Editor: Gemma Jones
- Founded: 1858; 168 years ago (as The South Australian Advertiser)
- Headquarters: 31 Waymouth Street, Adelaide, SA, Australia
- Website: www.adelaidenow.com.au

The Advertiser is a daily tabloid format newspaper based in the city of Adelaide, South Australia. First published as a broadsheet named The South Australian Advertiser on 12 July 1858, it is currently a tabloid printed from Monday to Saturday. The Advertiser came under the ownership of Keith Murdoch in the 1950s, and the full ownership of Rupert Murdoch in 1987. It is a publication of Advertiser Newspapers Pty Ltd (ADV), a subsidiary of News Corp Australia, itself a subsidiary of News Corp. Through much of the 20th century, The Advertiser was Adelaide's morning broadsheet, The News the afternoon tabloid, with The Sunday Mail covering weekend sport, and Messenger Newspapers community news. The head office was relocated from a former premises in King William Street, to a new News Corp office complex, known as Keith Murdoch House at 31 Waymouth Street.

== History ==
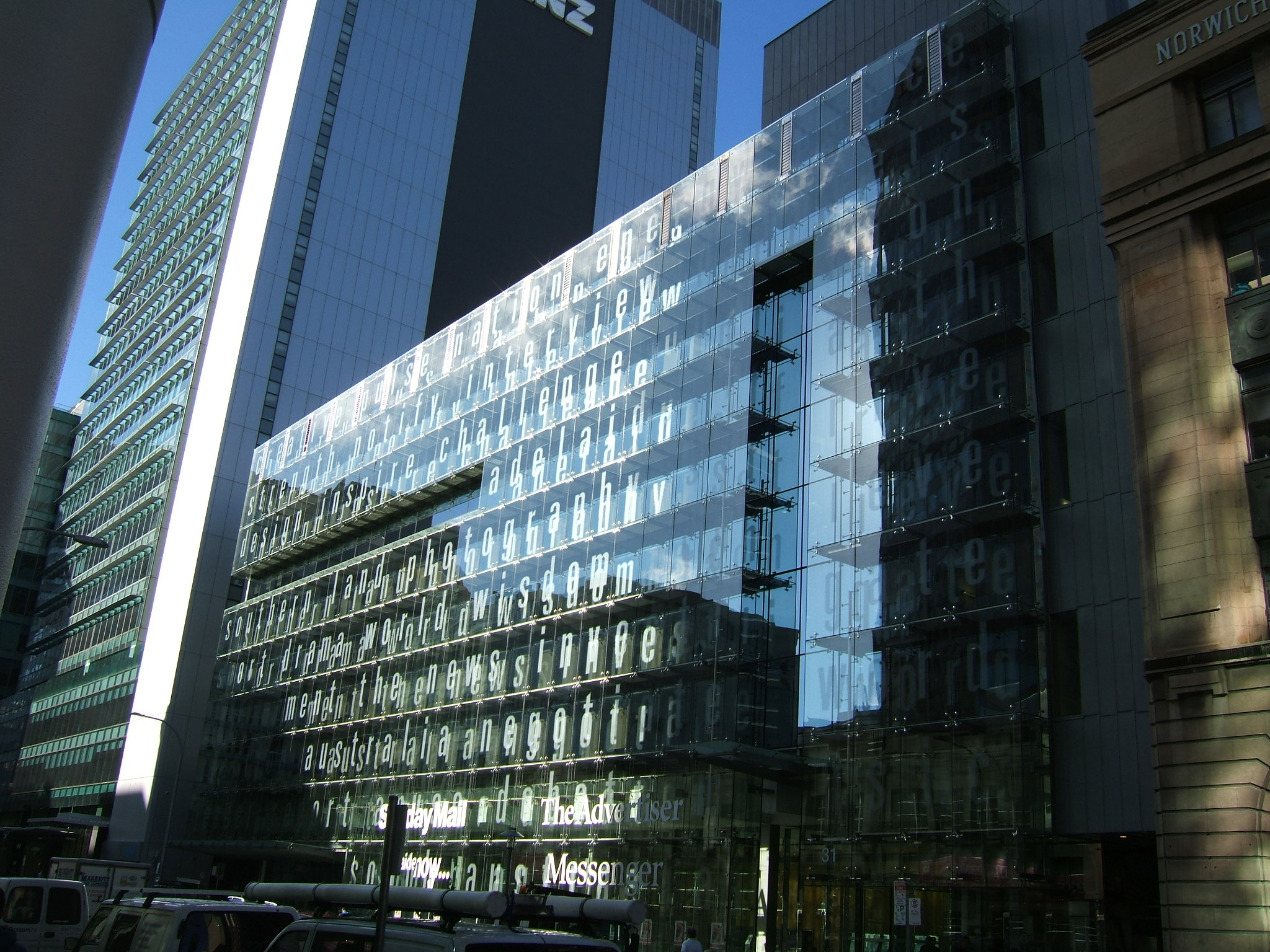
The office of The Advertiser in Waymouth Street, Adelaide

=== The South Australian Advertiser ===
An early major daily colonial newspaper, The Adelaide Times, ceased publication on 9 May 1858. Shortly afterwards, Reverend John Henry Barrow, a former editor of the South Australian Register founded the morning newspaper The South Australian Advertiser and a companion weekly The South Australian Weekly Chronicle. The original owners were Barrow and Charles Henry Goode, and the first issues were published on 12 July 1858 and 17 July 1858 respectively. It initially consisted of four pages, each of seven columns, and cost 4 pence.

In 1863 the company started an afternoon newspaper The Express as a competitor to The Telegraph, an afternoon/evening daily paper independent of both The Advertiser and the South Australian Register. The company was then re-formed, effective 9 September 1864, with additional shareholders Philip Henry Burden, John Baker, Captain Scott, James Counsell, Thomas Graves and others. Burden, secretary of the company, died in 1864, and Barrow, whose wife had died in 1856, married his widow in 1865, thus owning together a quarter of the company. In December 1866, the syndicate bought the now defunct The Telegraph (by this time renamed The Daily Telegraph with a morning edition and a weekend Weekly Mail) at auction, and incorporated it with The Express to form The Express and Telegraph.

In 1871, when the shareholders were Barrow, Goode, Robert Stuckey, Thomas Graves, William Parkin, Thomas King, James Counsell, and George Williams Chinner, the partnership was dissolved and the business was carried on by Barrow and King. J. H. Barrow died on 22 August 1874, and Thomas King ran the papers for himself and Mrs. Barrow for about five years. In 1879 a new firm was created, consisting of Thomas King, Fred Burden (son of P. H. Burden and adopted son of J. H. Barrow), and John Langdon Bonython. In July 1884, Thomas King dropped out, and the firm of Burden & Bonython was formed to run the paper.

=== The Advertiser ===
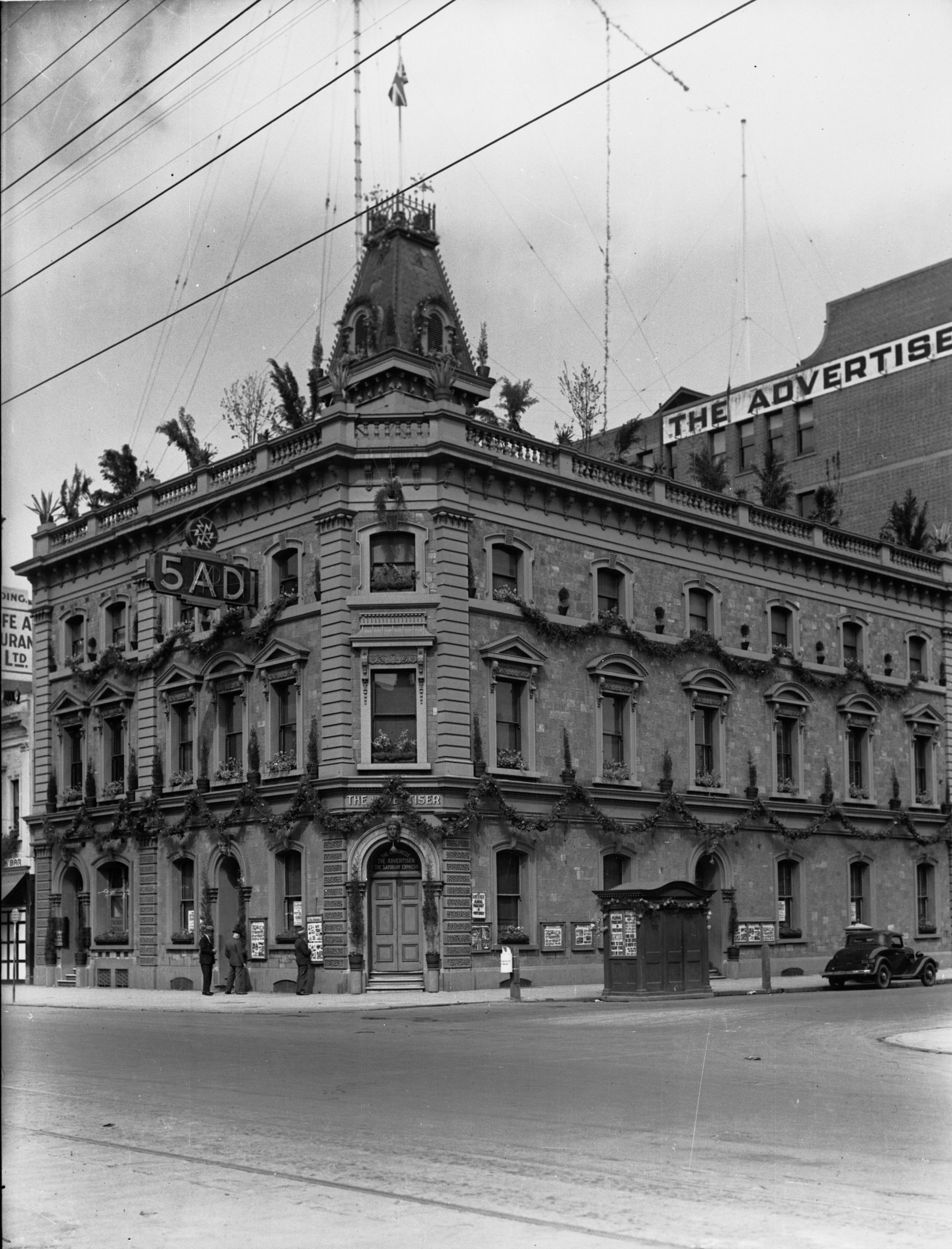
The Advertiser Building on King William Street, Adelaide, 1936

On 1 April 1889, the main publication was re-branded with an abbreviated title, The Advertiser. In December 1891, Burden retired, and sold his share of the company to Bonython, who, from 1894 to 1929, became the sole proprietor of The Advertiser. As well as being a talented newspaper editor, he also supported the movement towards the Federation of Australia. Later, in 1923, after a run of 60 years, The Express was stopped just as its renamed rival, The News, was starting. On 12 January 1929, The Mail announced that Bonython had sold The Advertiser for £1,250,000 to a group of Melbourne financiers The Herald and Weekly Times, an external media company, now had the controlling stake, but Bonython still retained a 48.7% interest. Bonython then retired from his newspapers in 1929, after 65 years' service, and his son, John Lavington Bonython, became editor. In February 1931, in the wake of the Great Depression, The Advertiser took over and shut down its ailing competitors, The Register (published 1836–1931), The Chronicle (Register's Saturday sister publication), and The Observer (published 1843–1931), briefly renaming itself for seven months as The Advertiser and Register.

=== News Corp Australia ===
On the death of Keith Murdoch in 1952, ownership of The News and The Mail passed to his son Rupert Murdoch via News Limited. Following the handover, and in response to suggestions of external influences from Victoria made by competing newspaper The Mail, the Chairman of The Advertiser's board published its policy in The Advertiser as follows:

"It is the same today as when the late Sir Langdon Bonython was in sole control. It is based upon a profound pride and belief in South Australia, and the system of private enterprise which has made this State what it is."

On 24 October 1953 the company launched the Sunday Advertiser in direct competition to News Limited's The Mail, but failed to outreach its rival, though no doubt affecting its profitability. It ceased publication five years or so later, after which the by then renamed Sunday Mail advertised itself as a joint publication of Advertiser Newspapers and News Ltd., and incorporated many of the Sunday Advertiser regular features. It had also introduced colour graphics on the comics page (rather primitive by today's standards), but this was dropped shortly after joint publication commenced.

In addition, The Messenger, published since 1951 was partially purchased in 1962, and fully owned by 1983. When Murdoch acquired The Herald and Weekly Times in 1987, he also acquired the remaining 48.7% share of The Advertiser. He sold The News in 1987, and it was closed in 1992. Murdoch then changed the format of The Advertiser from a broadsheet to a tabloid in November 1997, and the masthead and content font and layout was modernised in September 2009.

== Circulation ==
The Advertiser is available for purchase throughout South Australia and some towns and regions in New South Wales, Victoria and the Northern Territory located near or adjacent to the South Australia state border such as Broken Hill, Mildura, Nhill and Alice Springs. According to The Advertiser's website, the newspaper is read by over 580,000 people each weekday, and by more than 740,000 people each Saturday. Circulation figures reported in May 2016 by Roy Morgan Research showed a continuing decline in readership, of 324,000 on weekdays, and 371,000 on Saturdays.

The Advertiser's website, adelaidenow.com.au, was rated by third-party web analytics providers Alexa and SimilarWeb as, respectively, the 268th and 313th most visited website in Australia, as of August 2015. SimilarWeb rates the site as the 29th most visited news website in Australia, attracting almost 1.8 million visitors per month. In 2015, along with other News Corp websites, The Advertiser's website adopted a paywall with non-subscribers being locked out of "premium" content.

== Notable personnel ==
Personnel at The Advertiser include:

- Sir John Langdon Bonython, editor
- Sir John Lavington Bonython, management
- Michael Atchison OAM, cartoonist
- Natalie von Bertouch
- Nick Cater
- Alfred Thomas Chandler
- Annabel Crabb
- Tanya Denver
- Sidney Downer
- Brady Haran OAM
- Andrew Kirkpatrick
- Pat Oliphant
- Tory Shepherd
- Frederick Samuel Wallis

== Digitisation ==
The National Library of Australia has digitised, by OCR, photographically archived copies of the following newspapers, accessible through Trove:

- The South Australian Advertiser – 12 July 1858 Vol. I No. 1 to 30 March 1889 (Vol XXXI No. 9,500)
- The Adelaide Express 2 December 1863 (Vol 1. No. 3) to 29 December 1866 (Vol. IV No. 923)
- Express and Telegraph from 2 January 1867 (Vol. IV, No. 925) to 3 November 1922 (Vol LIX No. 17,780)
- The Advertiser – 1 April 1889 (Vol. XXXI No. 9,501) to 20 February 1931 (LXXIII No. 22,579)
- The Advertiser and The Register –
- The Advertiser – 1 October 1931 (Vol. LXXIV No. 22,769) to 31 December 1954 (Vol. 97 No. 30,019)

== Endorsements ==
National election	Endorsement
2010	Labor
2013	Coalition
2016	Coalition
2019	Coalition
2022	Coalition

== See also ==
- List of newspapers in Australia
