= John Henry Barrow =

Australian politician

John Barrow
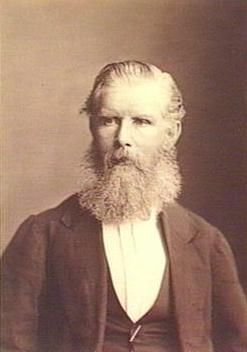

Treasurer of South Australia
- In office 4 March 1872 – 22 July 1873
- Premier: Henry Ayers
- Preceded by: Henry Hughes
- Succeeded by: Lavington Glyde

Member of the South Australian Parliament for East Torrens
- In office 6 April 1858 – 12 March 1860 Serving with Lavington Glyde
- Preceded by: Charles Bonney
- Succeeded by: Neville Blyth

Member of the South Australian Parliament for The Sturt
- In office 14 December 1871 – 22 August 1874 Serving with William Townsend
- Preceded by: John Lindsay
- Succeeded by: William Mair

Personal details
- Born: 15 February 1819
- Died: 13 August 1874 (aged 55)
- Occupation: Congregational minister

John Henry Barrow (1817 – 22 August 1874) was a Congregational minister, journalist and South Australian politician.

== Early life ==
Barrow was born in England, son of John Barrow. After he studied for the Congregational ministry at Hackney College, he took charge of the Congregational Church at Market Drayton in Shropshire, where he also ran a school.

== Career in Australia ==
Barrow emigrated to Adelaide, South Australia, in the hope that a change of climate would be beneficial to the health of his invalid wife, arriving in September 1853 on the Hannah Maria with his wife and four children, and obtained a position in the office of the South Australian Register.

He was, with Philip H. Burden and E. Jones, a tenant of Samuel R. and John H. Kearne's property "Oaklands" (now the suburbs of Oaklands Park and Warradale).

He joined the seventh Henry Ayers ministry as Treasurer of South Australia in March 1872, holding the position until Ayers resigned in July 1873.

John Barrow was also the first Mayor of the newly created municipality of the Town of Unley, and was an active member of the South Australian Free Rifle Corps.

== Late life ==
In mid-1873, Barrow's health declined; he died in Adelaide on 22 August 1874 of an effusion on the brain. He was married twice and left a widow, three sons and three daughters.

== Family ==
Barrow was married to Sarah Barrow née Liversedge (c. 1814 – 4 October 1856). Their children included:

- Sarah Ann Barrow (1844– ) married Edward "Ned" Jones of Oaklands, Yorke Peninsula on 29 January 1864
- John Thomas Barrow (c. 1846 – ) married Annie Jones in 1874, was a surveyor in Adelaide; land agent in Victoria; Inspector of Lands in Western Australia 1908–1913, lived South Perth. Annie was a daughter of Capt. T. P. Jones

- John Henry Barrow married Ethel May Farmer on 30 December 1905.
- T. G. A. Barrow ( – 30 March 1918) killed in France during WWI.

- Mary Eleanore Barrow (c. 1847 – 12 July 1937) married Abraham Walter Bishop (1847–1925) on 6 October 1872, lived in Nausori, Fiji, died in New Zealand.
- George L. Barrow (May 1851 – 11 August 1925), a journalist who was jailed for libel, then lived in Victoria, then Western Australia and Fiji, where he died.
- Margaretta Anna Barrow (c. 1853 – 16 July 1937) married Henry Lancaster Beddome ( – ) on 17 February 1881. The two sisters died in the same week.

On 15 August 1865 Barrow married again, to Mary Burden (died 10 May 1907), the widow of Philip H. Burden (c. 1823 – 3 March 1864), and adopted her children, who included

- Philip Henry Burden Jr. (1851 – 5 October 1902), the eldest adopted son, married Rachel Ann English (died 23 August 1940) on 25 February 1875. She was a daughter of Thomas English.
- Frederic Britten Burden (1852 – 30 January 1897) married Ada Hallett on 20 May 1879. He was a businessman and newspaper editor in South Australia
- Annie Burden (1854 – )
- Florence Burden (13 November 1858 – 19 January 1939) married Dr. William Thornborough Hayward (26 June 1854 – 21 December 1928) on 26 June 1879. Florence, also writing as "Firenze", was a published author.

Mary married again, to Benjamin Cowderoy on 25 November 1878.

South Australian House of Assembly
Preceded by Horace Dean	Member for Barossa; 1857–1860; Served alongside: Walter Duffield	Succeeded by Edward Grundy
New district	Member for East Adelaide; 1862–1864; Served alongside: Philip Santo	Succeeded by Philip Santo
Political offices
Preceded by Henry Hughes	Treasurer of South Australia; 1872–1873	Succeeded by Lavington Glyde
Civic offices
New title	Mayor of the Town of Unley; 1871–1872	Succeeded by tba
