= Charles Mann (Australian politician) =

Australian politician

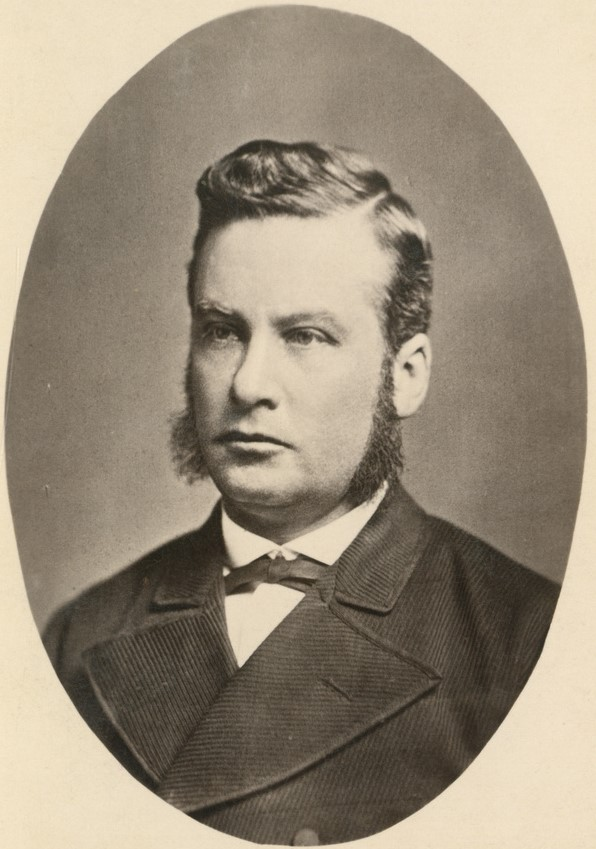

Charles Mann Junior, QC (8 April 1838 – 7 July 1889) was a politician in colonial South Australia, Treasurer of South Australia 1878 to 1881 and four times Attorney-General of South Australia.

== Early life and legal career ==
Mann was born in Adelaide, the son of Charles Mann, a prominent lawyer, and educated at St Peter's College, Adelaide. Having been articled to the firm of Messrs. Bagot & Labatt, he was admitted as a legal practitioner in 1860, and went into partnership with H. W. Parker (died 15 March 1874), a successful lawyer whose previous partner was R. D. Hanson. Mann was made Queen's Counsel in 1875. In 1879 he took on A. K. Whitby as a partner to take over his newly opened office in Jamestown. He was involved in many of the high-profile legal cases of the period; one of his last was acting as advisor to the liquidators of the failed Commercial Bank of South Australia and proceedings against its Directors.

== Political career ==
Mann was elected to the South Australian House of Assembly as member for Burra on 14 April 1870. Mann was four times Attorney-General of South Australia — from 21 July 1871 to 22 January 1872 (in the last John Hart government until 10 November 1871, afterwards in the Arthur Blyth Ministry which immediately followed it); in the third Blyth Ministry, from 22 July 1873 to 3 June 1875; in the second and third James Boucaut governments, from 25 March to 6 June 1876 and 26 October 1877 to 27 September 1878. From 12 February 1875 to 26 April 1881 Mann represented Stanley.

Mann was Treasurer in the William Morgan administration, from 27 September 1878 to 10 March 1881, when he was appointed Crown Solicitor and Public Prosecutor, both of which positions he filled till his death on 7 July 1889.

== Personal ==
On 10 August 1865 Charles Mann married Isabella Noble Rowland (died 10 January 1888) of Berwick-on-Tweed. They lived on East Terrace and had five daughters and two sons.

Mann was a prominent member of the Adelaide Club and a Steward of the South Australian Jockey Club.

== See also ==
- Hundred of Mann
