= William Mair (South Australian politician) =

Australian politician (??–1897)

William Mair (died 14 October 1897) was a politician in the British colony of South Australia.

== Life ==
Son of William Mair of Jersey, he arrived in South Australia around 1853, and found employment with Philip Levi & Co. He left to join the Public Service, then was appointed secretary of Wallaroo Mines Ltd. He spent some time in New Zealand in business, then returned to Adelaide, where he ran a business as general agents. He was secretary of Adelaide Underwriters' Association Ltd. from 1888 to the time of his death.

He represented The Sturt in the South Australian House of Assembly from September 1874 to February 1875, and vigorously supported the establishment of railways to Glenelg and Brighton.

He was elected mayor of Brighton in 1869, and served to November 1871.

His home "Plantations" in Glenelg was noted for its flower garden.

== Family ==
He married Mary Morphett (15 April 1840 – 30 October 1932), eldest daughter of Sir John Morphett, on 7 July 1862. Their children included:

- Hurtle William Morphett Mair (20 September 1863 – 1940) married Kathleen Dowling (4 April 1876 – ) on 10 July 1900. He died in Quirindi, New South Wales.
- George Hay Morphett Mair (10 July 1865 – ) married Dora List ( – 17 December 1940) on 30 June 1904
- Olive Morphett Mair (1 December 1867 – 17 January 1941) married sharebroker Charles Irwin (c. 1862 – 16 August 1923), son of Canon Irwin of Tasmania, on 2 November 1892
- Burgo Morphett Mair (22 June 1870 – 18 December 1956) married Catherine Amy Johnson ( – 25 May 1911) on 21 August 1901. He married again, to Celia Warden Wilby on 21 July 1926.
- Constance Mary Morphett Mair (21 November 1872 – 5 October 1951) married wine merchant and LCL executive Frederick William Ralph (1863 – 13 December 1944).

Their home was "Plantations", Glenelg.
