= 3rd Parliament of South Australia =

1862–1865 meeting of the South Australian Parliament

Third Parliament of South Australia
←	2nd	4th	→
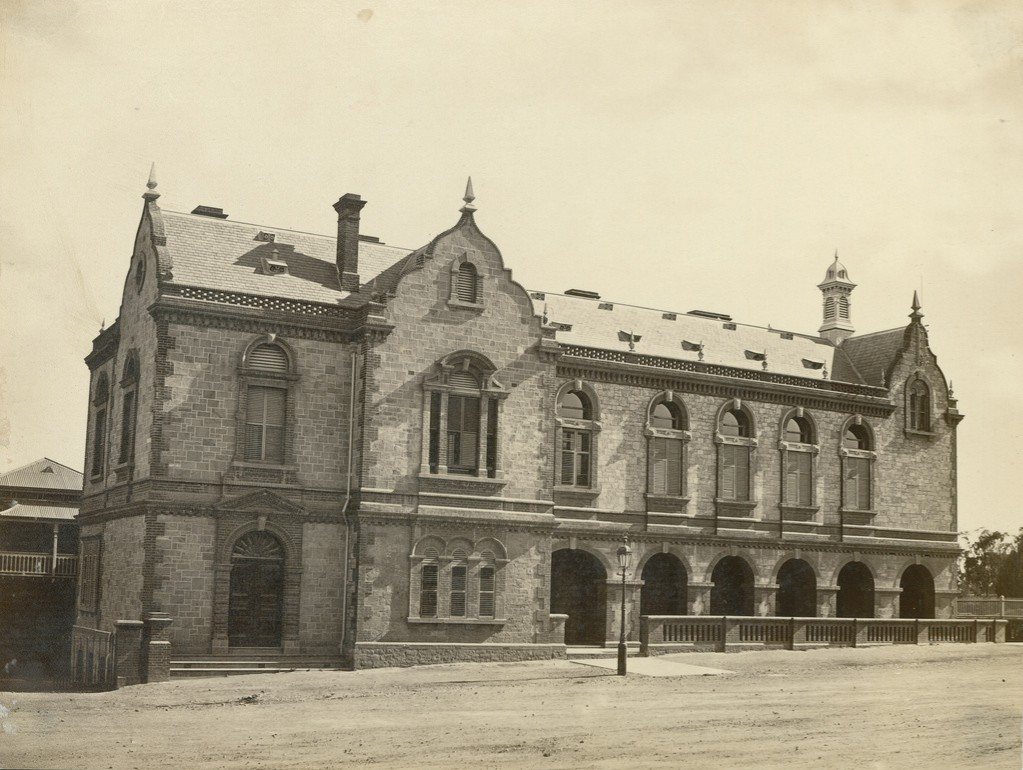
- Old Parliament House (1872)

Overview
- Legislative body: Parliament of South Australia
- Meeting place: Old Parliament House
- Term: 27 February 1863 – 25 January 1865
- Election: 10–24 November 1862

Legislative Council
- Members: 18
- President: James Hurtle Fisher

House of Assembly
- Members: 36
- Speaker: George Charles Hawker

Sessions
- 1st: 27 February 1863 – 12 November 1863
- 2nd: 27 May 1864 – 9 December 1864

The 3rd Parliament of South Australia was a meeting of the legislative branch of the South Australian state government, composed of the South Australian Legislative Council and the South Australian House of Assembly.

== Leadership ==
Legislative Council

- President of the Legislative Council: James Hurtle Fisher
- Clerk of the Legislative Council: Francis Corbet Singleton
- Clerk's assistant and Sergeant-at-arms: Joseph George Atkinson Branthwaite

House of Assembly

- Speaker of the House of Assembly: George Charles Hawker
- Clerk of the House of Assembly: George William de la Poer Beresford
- Clerk's assistant and Sargeant-at-arms: James Newnham Blackmore

== Membership ==
=== Legislative Council ===
6 of the 18 seats in the upper house were contested in the election on 28 March 1861. Members elected in 1861 are marked with an asterisk (*).

▌ George Fife Angas
▌ Henry Ayers
▌ John Baker
▌ John Henry Barrow*
▌ Samuel Davenport*
▌ Charles Davies
▌ Thomas Elder
▌ Charles George Everard
▌ James Hurtle Fisher

▌ Anthony Forster*
▌ George Hall
▌ Edward McEllister
▌ John Morphett
▌ William Peacock*
▌ Abraham Scott*
▌ Judah Moss Solomon*
▌ Edward Stirling
▌ George Marsden Waterhouse

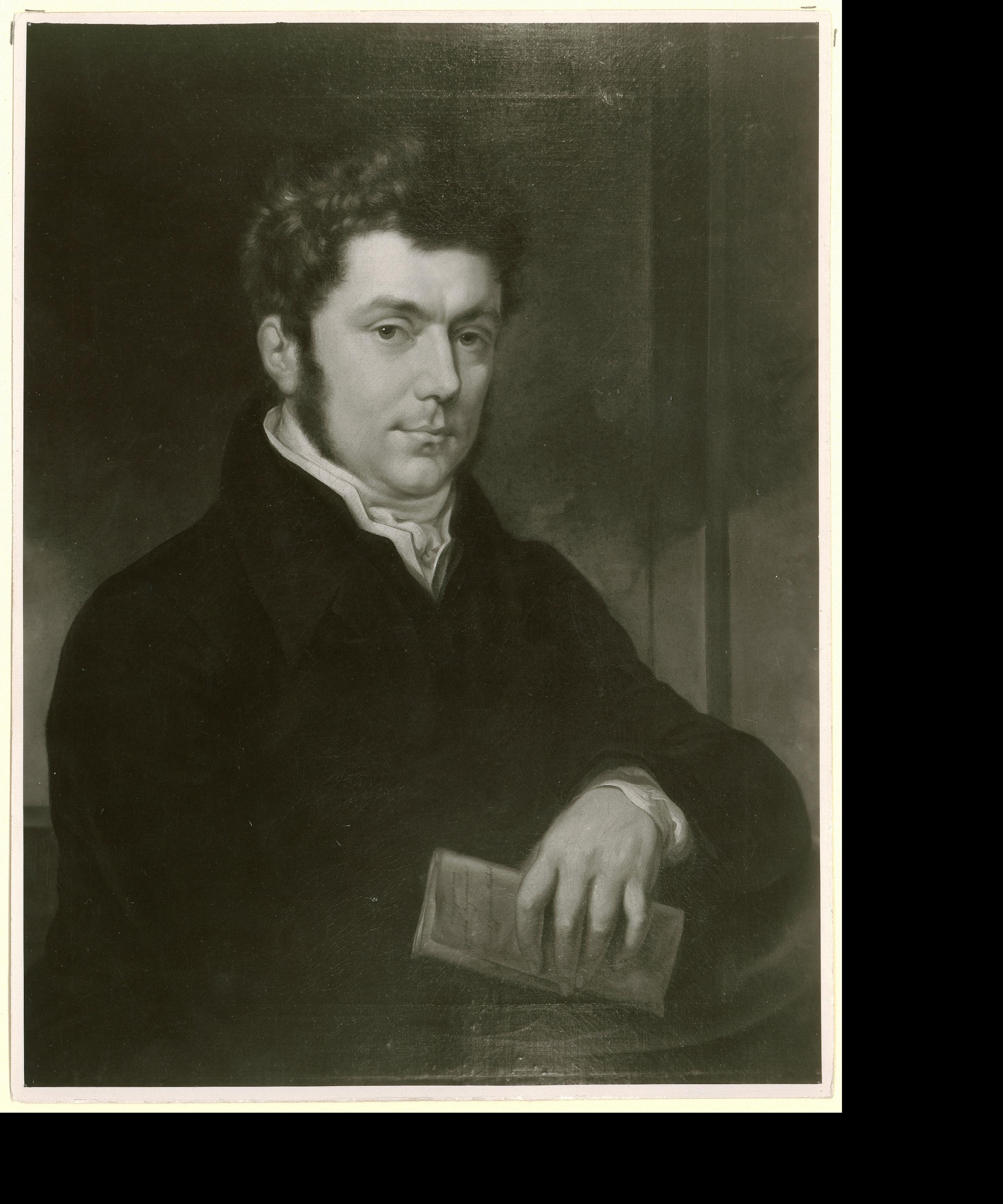
Legislative Council President
James Hurtle Fisher

=== House of Assembly ===
All 36 seats in the lower house were contested in the election on 24 November 1862.

Barossa

▌ Walter Duffield
▌ John Williams

The Burra

▌ George William Cole
▌ John Bentham Neales

East Adelaide

▌ Thomas Reynolds
▌ Philip Santo

East Torrens

▌ Neville Blyth
▌ Henry Mildred

Encounter Bay

▌ John Lindsay
▌ David Sutherland

Flinders

▌ Charles Lindsay
▌ Alfred Watts

Gumeracha

▌ Arthur Blyth
▌ Alexander Borthwick Murray

Light

▌ John Tuthill Bagot
▌ Francis Stacker Dutton

Mount Barker

▌ John Dunn, sen.
▌ William Rogers

Noarlunga

▌ John Colton
▌ Charles Thomas Hewett

Onkaparinga

▌ William Milne
▌ William Townsend

Port Adelaide

▌ Patrick Boyce Coglin
▌ John Hart, sen.

Stanley

▌ George Strickland Kingston
▌ George Young

The Sturt

▌ Richard Bullock Andrews
▌ Joseph Peacock

Victoria

▌ George Charles Hawker
▌ Randolph Isham Stow

West Adelaide

▌ Emanuel Solomon
▌ James Crabb Verco

West Torrens

▌ Augustine Stow
▌ Henry Bull Templer Strangways

Yatala

▌ Wentworth Cavenagh
▌ Lavington Glyde

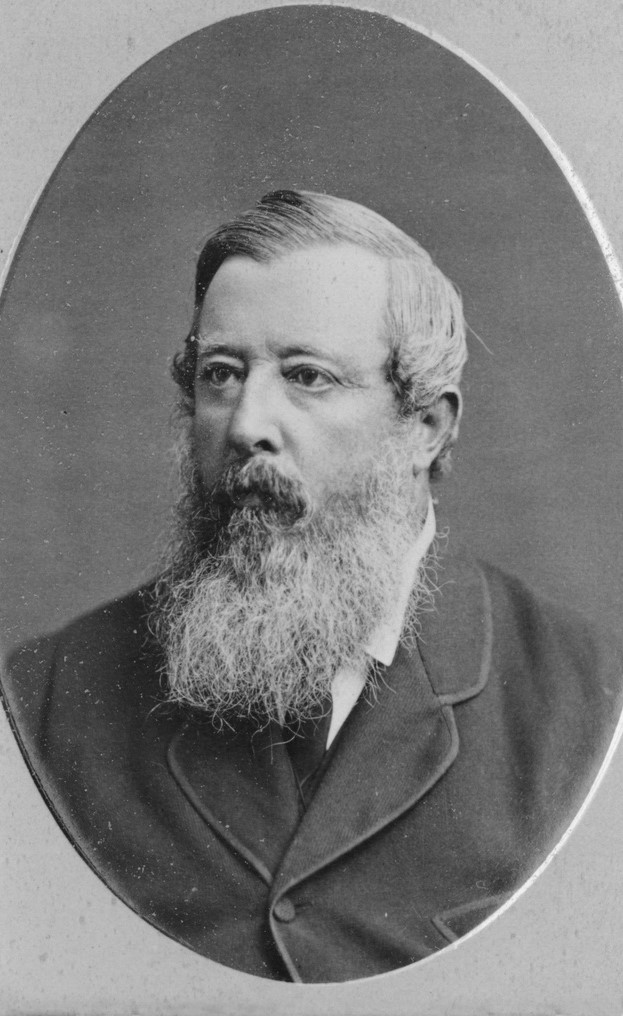
House of Assembly Speaker
George Charles Hawker

== Changes of membership ==
=== Legislative Council ===
Before	Change		After	
Member	Type	Date	Date	Member
Thomas Shuldham O'Halloran	Resigned	9 June 1863	7 August 1863	Edward McEllister
George Tinline	Failure to attend	9 June 1863	7 August 1863	John Baker
William Scott	Resigned	10 June 1863	7 August 1863	Thomas Elder
Anthony Forster	Resigned	7 December 1864		Vacant
George Marsden Waterhouse	Resigned	7 December 1864		Vacant

=== House of Assembly ===
Seat	Before	Change		After	
Seat	Member	Type	Date	Date	Member
Barossa	Joseph Barritt	Resigned	1 March 1864	8 June 1864	John Williams
Mount Barker	Allan McFarlane	Died	11 March 1864	8 June 1864	William Rogers
East Adelaide	William Bakewell	Resigned	27 October 1864	5 November 1864	Thomas Reynolds

== See also ==
- Members of the South Australian Legislative Council, 1861–1865
- Members of the South Australian House of Assembly, 1862–1865
