= 2nd Parliament of South Australia =

1860–1862 meeting of the South Australian Parliament

Second Parliament of South Australia
←	1st	3rd	→
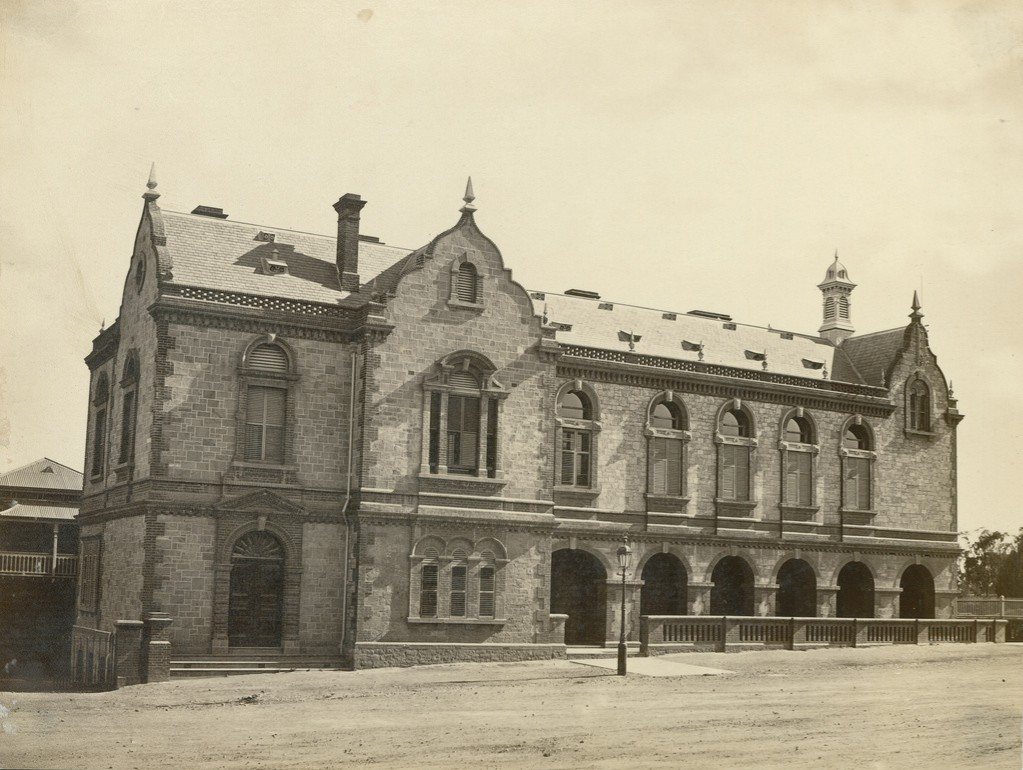
- Old Parliament House (1872)

Overview
- Legislative body: Parliament of South Australia
- Meeting place: Old Parliament House
- Term: 27 April 1860 – 22 October 1862
- Election: 13 March – 3 April 1860

Legislative Council
- Members: 18
- President: James Hurtle Fisher

House of Assembly
- Members: 36
- Speaker: George Charles Hawker

Sessions
- 1st: 27 April 1860 – 17 October 1860
- 2nd: 26 April 1861 – 3 December 1861
- 3rd: 25 April 1862 – 21 October 1862

The 2nd Parliament of South Australia was a meeting of the legislative branch of the South Australian state government, composed of the South Australian Legislative Council and the South Australian House of Assembly.

== Leadership ==
Legislative Council

- President of the Legislative Council: James Hurtle Fisher
- Clerk of the Legislative Council: Francis Corbet Singleton
- Clerk's assistant and Sergeant-at-arms: Joseph George Atkinson Branthwaite

House of Assembly

- Speaker of the House of Assembly: George Charles Hawker
- Clerk of the House of Assembly: George William de la Poer Beresford
- Clerk's assistant and Sargeant-at-arms: James Newnham Blackmore

== Membership ==
=== Legislative Council ===
==== Until 28 March 1861 ====
2 of the 18 seats in the upper house were contested in the election on 3 April 1860. Members elected in 1860 are marked with an asterisk (*).

▌ George Fife Angas
▌ Henry Ayers
▌ Charles Hervey Bagot
▌ John Baker
▌ Samuel Davenport
▌ Charles Davies
▌ Charles George Everard
▌ James Hurtle Fisher
▌ Anthony Forster

▌ George Hall
▌ John Morphett
▌ Thomas Shuldham O'Halloran
▌ Abraham Scott
▌ William Scott
▌ Edward Stirling
▌ George Tinline*
▌ George Marsden Waterhouse*
▌ William Younghusband

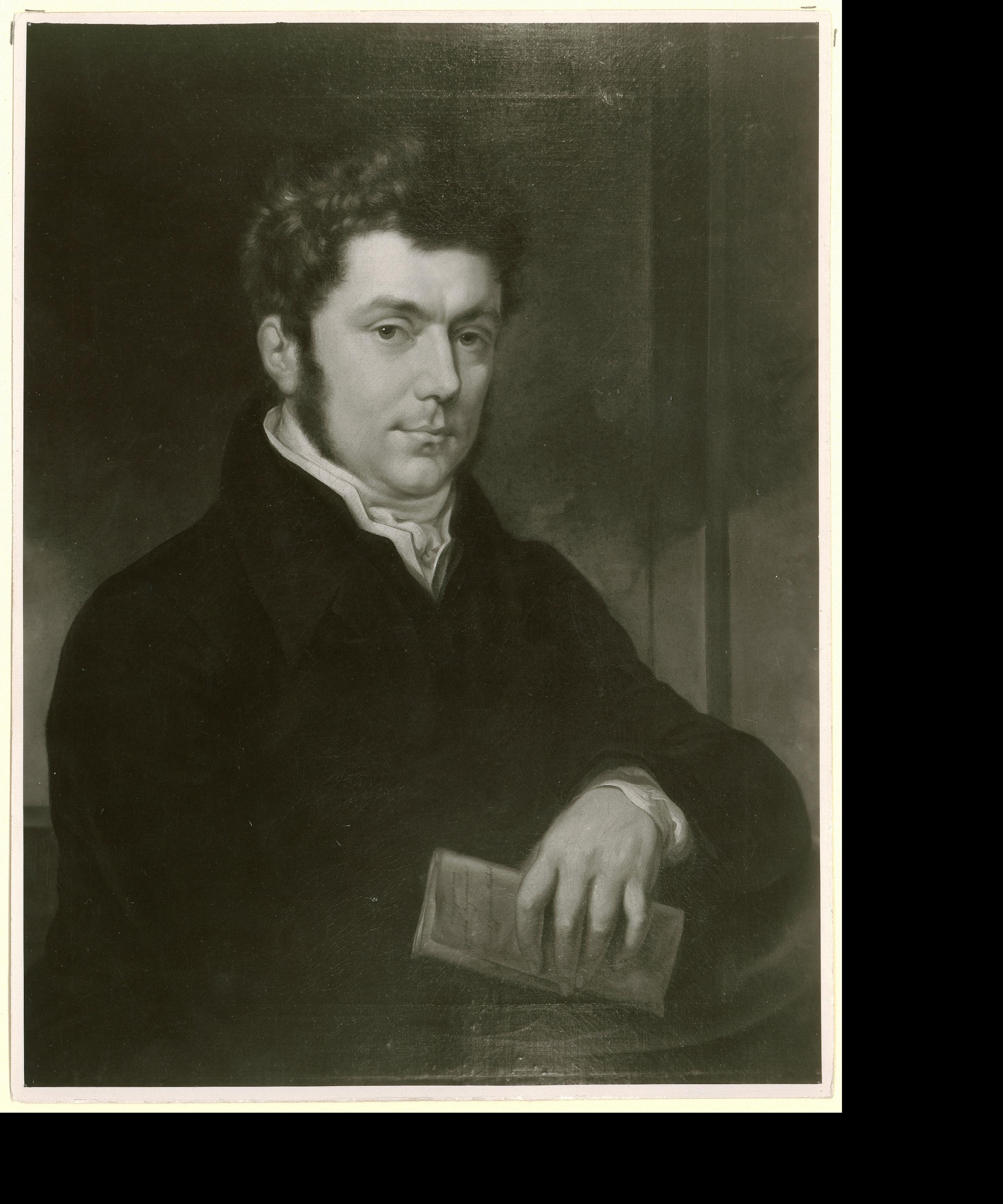
Legislative Council President
James Hurtle Fisher

==== From 28 March 1861 ====
6 of the 18 seats in the upper house were contested in the election on 28 March 1861. Members elected in 1861 are marked with an asterisk (*).

▌ George Fife Angas
▌ Henry Ayers
▌ John Henry Barrow*
▌ Samuel Davenport*
▌ Charles Davies
▌ Charles George Everard
▌ James Hurtle Fisher
▌ Anthony Forster*
▌ George Hall

▌ John Morphett
▌ Thomas Shuldham O'Halloran
▌ William Peacock*
▌ Abraham Scott*
▌ William Scott
▌ Judah Moss Solomon*
▌ Edward Stirling
▌ George Tinline
▌ George Marsden Waterhouse

=== House of Assembly ===
All 36 seats in the lower house were contested in the election on 3 April 1860.

City of Adelaide

▌ Samuel Bakewell
▌ James Penn Boucaut
▌ Matthew Moorhouse
▌ William Parkin
▌ Thomas Reynolds
▌ Philip Santo

Barossa

▌ Walter Duffield
▌ Edward Lindley Grundy

The Burra and Clare

▌ George William Cole
▌ George Strickland Kingston
▌ John Bentham Neales

East Torrens

▌ Neville Blyth
▌ Henry Mildred

Encounter Bay

▌ John Lindsay
▌ Henry Bull Templar Strangways

Flinders

▌ William James Browne

Gumeracha

▌ Arthur Blyth
▌ Alexander Borthwick Murray

Light

▌ John Tuthill Bagot
▌ John Rowe

Mount Barker

▌ John Dunn, sen.
▌ Boyle Travers Finniss

The Murray

▌ Allan McFarlane

Noarlunga

▌ Alexander Anderson
▌ David Sutherland

Onkaparinga

▌ William Milne
▌ William Townsend

Port Adelaide

▌ Patrick Boyce Coglin
▌ John Hart, sen.

The Sturt

▌ John Hallett
▌ Joseph Peacock

Victoria

▌ George Charles Hawker

West Torrens

▌ Thomas Magarey
▌ Randolph Isham Stow{

Yatala

▌ Lavington Glyde
▌ Edward McEllister

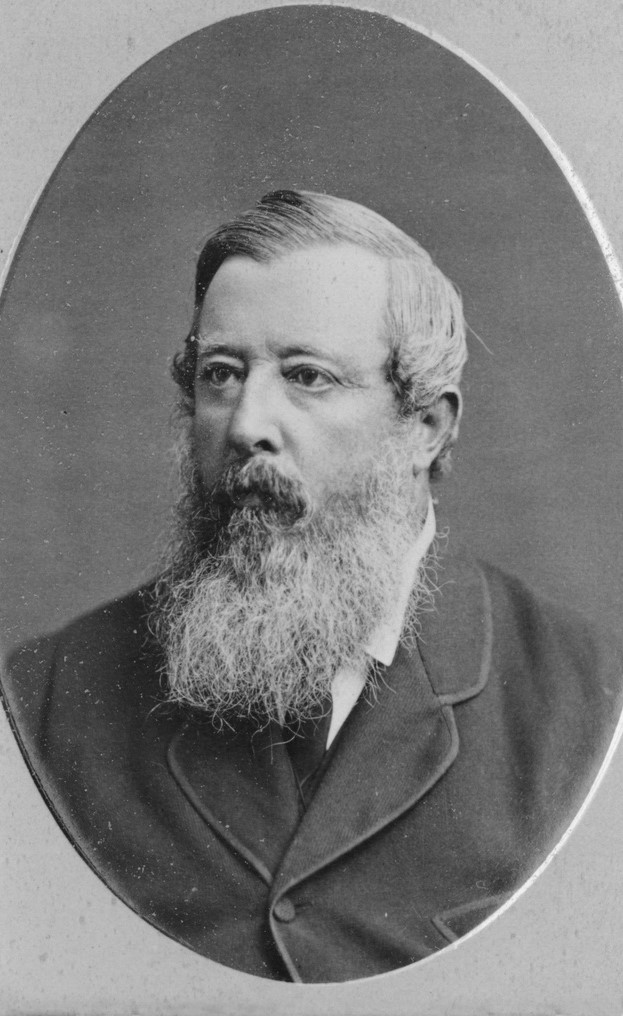
House of Assembly Speaker
George Charles Hawker

== Changes of membership ==
=== House of Assembly ===
Seat	Before	Change		After	
Seat	Member	Type	Date	Date	Member
The Burra and Clare	William Lennon	Insolvency	28 March 1861	6 May 1861	George Strickland Kingston
West Torrens	George Morphett	Resigned	15 April 1861	30 April 1861	Randolph Isham Stow
City of Adelaide	Richard Davies Hanson	Resigned	20 November 1861	9 December 1861	James Penn Boucaut
Gumeracha	Alexander Hay	Resigned	30 December 1861	8 May 1862	Alexander Borthwick Murray
The Murray	David Wark	Died	3 March 1862	8 May 1862	Allan McFarlane
The Burra and Clare	William Dale	Resigned	22 March 1862	8 May 1862	John Bentham Neales
Port Adelaide	William Owen	Resigned	22 March 1862	8 May 1862	John Hart, sen.
Light	Francis Stacker Dutton	Resigned	22 April 1862	8 May 1862	John Rowe

== See also ==
- Members of the South Australian Legislative Council, 1857–1861
- Members of the South Australian Legislative Council, 1861–1865
- Members of the South Australian House of Assembly, 1860–1862
