= 1862 South Australian House of Assembly election =

1862 South Australian colonial election (House of Assembly)
- 10–24 November 1862
- All 36 seats in the South Australian House of Assembly
- Turnout: N/A (Note: Turnout and informal voting details were not published for Light. In the other 15 electorates, the turnout was 8,531 (39.1%), the formal vote was 8,057 (94.4%) and the informal vote was 474 (5.6%).)
Party	Leader	Vote %	Seats	+/–
Independents	N/A	100.0	36	0
This lists parties that won seats. See the complete results below.
Results by electoral district
Premier before	Premier after
George Waterhouse	George Waterhouse

The 1862 South Australian House of Assembly election was held between 10 and 24 November 1862 to elect all 36 members of the South Australian House of Assembly as part of the 1862 South Australian colonial election.

== Overall results ==
House of Assembly (AV) – Turnout N/A (Non-CV)
Party	Votes			Seats	
Party	Votes	%	Swing (pp)	Seats	Change
Independent	13,157	100.0	±0.0	36	Steady
Total	13,157	100.0	–	36	
Formal votes	N/A	–	–		
Informal votes	N/A	–	–		
Turnout	N/A	–	–		
Enrolled voters	21,841	–	–		
Source: Electoral Commission of South Australia

== Results by district ==
=== Uncontested ===
Electoral district	Members elected
The Burra	George Cole; John Neales
Victoria	George Charles Hawker; Randolph Isham Stow

=== Barossa ===
1862 South Australian colonial election: Barossa
Candidate	Votes	%	±
Walter Duffield (elected 1)	285	39.9	+8.9
Joseph Barritt (elected 2)	251	35.2	+35.2
Edward Grundy	178	24.9	–16.3
Total formal votes	425	95.9	–
Informal votes	17	4.1	–
Turnout	442	30.5	–

=== East Adelaide ===
1862 South Australian colonial election: East Adelaide
Candidate	Votes	%	±
William Bakewell (elected 1)	353	30.4	+30.4
Philip Santo (elected 2)	312	26.9	+26.9
James Boucaut	291	25.0	+25.0
Edward Collett Homersham	206	17.7	+17.7
Total formal votes	638	95.8	+95.8
Informal votes	28	4.2	+4.2
Turnout	666	37.9	+37.9

=== East Torrens ===
1862 South Australian colonial election: East Torrens
Candidate	Votes	%	±
Neville Blyth (elected 1)	393	36.7	+5.4
Henry Mildred (elected 2)	364	34.0	–9.5
Augustine Stow	314	29.3	+29.3
Total formal votes	681	97.4	+3.4
Informal votes	18	2.6	–3.4
Turnout	699	46.8	–5.1

=== Encounter Bay ===
1862 South Australian colonial election: Encounter Bay
Candidate	Votes	%	±
John Lindsay (elected 1)	281	41.3	+1.8
David Sutherland (elected 2)	203	29.8	+29.8
William Everard	197	28.9	+28.9
Total formal votes	475	98.8	+1.8
Informal votes	6	1.2	–1.8
Turnout	481	47.8	+15.7

=== Flinders ===
1862 South Australian colonial election: Flinders
Candidate	Votes	%	±
Alfred Watts (elected 1)	32	40.5	+40.5
Charles Lindsay (elected 2)	28	35.4	+35.4
AJ Murray	19	24.1	+24.1
Total formal votes	49	46.2	–
Informal votes	57	53.8	–
Turnout	106	17.8	–

=== Gumeracha ===
1862 South Australian colonial election: Gumeracha
Candidate	Votes	%	±
Arthur Blyth (elected 1)	328	44.9	+44.9
Alexander Borthwick Murray (elected 2)	274	37.5	+37.5
James White	128	17.5	+17.5
Total formal votes	395	96.6	–
Informal votes	11	3.4	–
Turnout	406	34.1	–

=== Light ===
1862 South Australian colonial election: Light
Candidate	Votes	%	±
Francis Dutton (elected 1)	383	36.1	+36.1
John Tuthill Bagot (elected 2)	356	33.6	+33.6
James White	321	30.3	+30.3
Total formal votes	N/A	–	–
Informal votes	N/A	–	–
Turnout	N/A	–	–

=== Mount Barker ===
1862 South Australian colonial election: Mount Barker
Candidate	Votes	%	±
John Dunn (elected 1)	482	38.8	+13.8
Allan McFarlane (elected 2)	367	29.6	+29.6
Daniel Ferguson	332	26.8	+26.8
James Thompson	60	4.8	+4.8
Total formal votes	819	96.7	–
Informal votes	28	3.3	–
Turnout	847	45.8	–

=== Noarlunga ===
1862 South Australian colonial election: Noarlunga
Candidate	Votes	%	±
Charles Thomas Hewett (elected 1)	171	22.4	–2.3
John Colton (elected 2)	160	20.9	+20.9
Phillip Hollins	156	20.4	+20.4
David Sutherland	145	19.0	–19.8
John Carr	104	13.6	+13.6
John Hallett	29	3.8	+3.8
Total formal votes	482	96.6	+4.2
Informal votes	17	3.4	–4.2
Turnout	499	42.8	+5.3

=== Onkaparinga ===
1862 South Australian colonial election: Onkaparinga
Candidate	Votes	%	±
William Townsend (elected 1)	472	44.7	+44.7
William Milne (elected 2)	426	40.4	+40.4
Charles Brown	157	14.9	+14.9
Total formal votes	580	91.8	–
Informal votes	52	8.2	–
Turnout	632	34.7	–

=== Port Adelaide ===
1862 South Australian colonial election: Port Adelaide
Candidate	Votes	%	±
John Hart (elected 1)	397	44.8	+44.8
Patrick Boyce Coglin (elected 2)	299	33.7	–0.6
Edward Kirk Horn	190	21.4	+21.4
Total formal votes	516	99.4	–
Informal votes	3	0.6	–
Turnout	519	48.4	–

=== Stanley ===
1862 South Australian colonial election: Stanley
Candidate	Votes	%	±
George Strickland Kingston (elected 1)	272	38.8	+38.8
George Young (elected 2)	252	35.9	+35.9
Edward Grundy	112	16.0	+16.0
Boyle Travers Finniss	65	9.3	+9.3
Total formal votes	411	93.2	+93.2
Informal votes	30	6.8	+6.8
Turnout	441	48.4	+48.4

=== The Sturt ===
1862 South Australian colonial election: The Sturt
Candidate	Votes	%	±
Richard Bullock Andrews (elected 1)	191	39.5	+10.2
Joseph Peacock (elected 2)	174	36.0	–4.8
John Hallett	118	24.4	–5.5
Total formal votes	298	92.5	–1.1
Informal votes	24	7.5	+1.1
Turnout	322	32.3	–26.3

=== West Adelaide ===
1862 South Australian colonial election: West Adelaide
Candidate	Votes	%	±
James Crabb Verco (elected 1)	295	26.6	+26.6
Emanuel Solomon (elected 2)	291	26.2	+26.2
Boyle Travers Finniss	278	25.0	+25.0
Henry Robert Fuller	247	22.2	+22.2
Total formal votes	660	95.8	+95.8
Informal votes	29	4.2	+4.2
Turnout	689	34.5	+34.5

=== West Torrens ===
1862 South Australian colonial election: West Torrens
Candidate	Votes	%	±
Augustine Stow (elected 1)	246	35.4	+35.4
Henry Strangways (elected 2)	226	32.6	+32.6
John Pickering	180	25.9	–2.0
Donald Stanley McLeod	42	6.1	+6.1
Total formal votes	423	89.6	–1.3
Informal votes	49	10.4	+1.3
Turnout	472	42.2	–7.6

=== Yatala ===
1862 South Australian colonial election: Yatala
Candidate	Votes	%	±
Lavington Glyde (elected 1)	282	39.0	–3.2
Wentworth Cavenagh (elected 2)	273	37.7	+37.7
Edward McEllister	112	15.5	–21.8
Thomas William Sayers	57	7.9	+7.9
Total formal votes	494	93.4	+11.2
Informal votes	35	6.6	–11.2
Turnout	529	46.3	+10.6
