= Members of the South Australian House of Assembly, 1860–1862 =

This is a list of members of the second parliament of the South Australian House of Assembly, which sat from 27 April 1860 until 22 October 1862. The members were elected at the 1860 colonial election.

Name	Electorate	Term(s) in Office
Alexander Anderson	Noarlunga	1860–1862
John Bagot	Light	1857–1865
Samuel Bakewell	City of Adelaide	1860–1862
Arthur Blyth	Gumeracha	1857–1868, 1870–1877
Neville Blyth	East Torrens	1860–1867, 1868–1870, 1871, 1877–1878
James Boucaut ^{3}	City of Adelaide	1861–1862, 1865–1870, 1871–1878
William James Browne	Flinders	1860–1862
Patrick Coglin	Port Adelaide	1860–1868, 1870–1871, 1875–1881, 1882–1887
George William Cole	The Burra and Clare	1860–1866
William Dale ^{8}	The Burra and Clare	1860–1862
Walter Duffield	Barossa	1857–1868, 1870–1871
John Dunn	Mount Barker	1857–1868, 1868
Francis Dutton ^{9}	Light	1857–1862, 1862–1865
Boyle Travers Finniss	Mount Barker	1857–1862
Lavington Glyde	Yatala	1857–1875, 1877–1884
Edward Grundy	Barossa	1860–1862
John Hallett	The Sturt	1857–1862
Richard Hanson ^{3}	City of Adelaide	1857–1861
John Hart ^{7}	Port Adelaide	1857–1859, 1862–1866, 1868–1873
George Charles Hawker	Victoria	1858–1865, 1875–1883, 1884–1895
Alexander Hay ^{4}	Gumeracha	1857–1861, 1867–1871
George Strickland Kingston ^{1}	The Burra and Clare	1857–1860, 1861–1880
William Lennon ^{1}	The Burra and Clare	1860–1861
John Lindsay	Encounter Bay	1860–1865, 1870–1871
Thomas Magarey	West Torrens	1860–1862
Edward McEllister	Yatala	1858–1862
Allan McFarlane ^{6}	The Murray; Mount Barker	1862; 1862–1864
Henry Mildred	East Torrens	1857–1865
William Milne	Onkaparinga	1857–1868
Matthew Moorhouse	City of Adelaide	1860–1862
George Morphett ^{2}	West Torrens	1860–1861
Alexander Borthwick Murray ^{4}	Gumeracha	1862–1867
John Bentham Neales ^{8}	The Burra and Clare	1857–1860, 1862–1870
William Owen ^{7}	Port Adelaide	1857–1860, 1859–1862
William Parkin	City of Adelaide	1860–1862
Joseph Peacock	The Sturt	1860–1867
Thomas Reynolds ^{5}	City of Adelaide	1857–1862, 1862, 1864–1870, 1871–1872, 1872–1873
John Rowe ^{9}	Light	1862
Philip Santo	City of Adelaide	1860–1870
Randolph Isham Stow ^{2}	West Torrens	1861–1865, 1866–1868, 1873–1875
Henry Strangways	Encounter Bay	1858–1871
David Sutherland	Noarlunga	1860–1862, 1862–1868
William Townsend	Onkaparinga	1857–1882
David Wark ^{6}	The Murray	1857–1862

^{1} The Burra and Clare MHA William Lennon was declared insolvent and thus ineligible to serve as a member of parliament on 28 March 1861. George Kingston won the resulting by-election on 6 May.
^{2} West Torrens MHA George Morphett resigned on 15 April 1861. Randolph Isham Stow won the resulting by-election on 30 April.
^{3} City of Adelaide MHA Richard Hanson resigned on 20 November 1861. James Boucaut won the resulting by-election on 9 December.
^{4} Gumeracha MHA Alexander Hay resigned on 30 December 1861. Alexander Murray won the resulting by-election on 8 May 1862.
^{5} City of Adelaide MHA Thomas Reynolds resigned on 17 February 1862. He subsequently nominated for the resulting by-election and was re-elected to his seat on 2 May.
^{6} The Murray MHA David Wark died on 3 March 1862. Allan McFarlane won the resulting by-election on 8 May. The seat of The Murray was subsumed into Mount Barker at the close of this parliament.
^{7} Port Adelaide MHA William Owen resigned on 22 March 1862. John Hart won the resulting by-election on 8 May.
^{8} The Burra and Clare MHA William Dale resigned on 22 March 1862. John Bentham Neales won the resulting by-election on 8 May.
^{9} Light MHA Francis Dutton resigned on 22 April 1862. John Rowe won the resulting by-election on 8 May.
