= Members of the South Australian House of Assembly, 1862–1865 =

This is a list of members of the third parliament of the South Australian House of Assembly, which sat from 27 February 1863 until 25 January 1865. The members were elected at the November 1862 colonial election.

Name	Electorate	Term in Office
Richard Andrews	The Sturt	1857–1860, 1862–1870
John Bagot	Light	1857–1865
William Bakewell ^{[3]}	East Adelaide	1857–1860, 1862–1864
Joseph Barritt ^{[1]}	Barossa	1862–1864
Arthur Blyth	Gumeracha	1857–1868, 1870–1877
Neville Blyth	East Torrens	1860–1867, 1868–1870, 1871, 1877–1878
Wentworth Cavenagh	Yatala	1862–1875, 1875–1881
Patrick Coglin	Port Adelaide	1860–1868, 1870–1871, 1875–1881, 1882–1887
George William Cole	The Burra	1860–1866
John Colton	Noarlunga	1862–1870, 1875–1878, 1880–1887
Walter Duffield	Barossa	1857–1868, 1870–1871
John Dunn	Mount Barker	1857–1868, 1868
Francis Dutton	Light	1857–1862, 1862–1865
Lavington Glyde	Yatala	1857–1875, 1877–1884
John Hart	Port Adelaide	1857–1859, 1862–1866, 1868–1873
George Charles Hawker	Victoria	1858–1865, 1875–1883, 1884–1895
Charles Thomas Hewett	Noarlunga	1862–1865
George Kingston	Stanley	1857–1860, 1861–1880
Charles Lindsay	Flinders	1862–1865
John Lindsay	Encounter Bay	1860–1865, 1870–1871
Allan McFarlane ^{[2]}	The Murray; Mount Barker	1862; 1862–1864
Henry Mildred	East Torrens	1857–1865
William Milne	Onkaparinga	1857–1868
Alexander Borthwick Murray	Gumeracha	1862–1867
John Bentham Neales	The Burra	1857–1860, 1862–1870
Joseph Peacock	The Sturt	1860–1867
Thomas Reynolds ^{[3]}	East Adelaide	1857–1862, 1862, 1864–1870, 1871–1872, 1872–1873
William Rogers ^{[2]}	Mount Barker	1858–1860, 1864–1865, 1868, 1868–1870, 1872–1875
Philip Santo	East Adelaide	1860–1870
Emanuel Solomon	West Adelaide	1862–1865
Augustine Stow	West Torrens	1862–1865, 1866–1868
Randolph Isham Stow	Victoria	1861–1865, 1866–1868, 1873–1875
Henry Strangways	West Torrens	1858–1871
David Sutherland	Encounter Bay	1860–1862, 1862–1868
William Townsend	Onkaparinga	1857–1882
James Verco	West Adelaide	1862–1865
Alfred Watts	Flinders	1862–1866, 1868–1875
John Williams ^{[1]}	Barossa	1864–1868, 1875–1878
George Young	Stanley	1862–1865

^{1} Barossa MHA Joseph Barritt resigned on 1 March 1864. John Williams won the resulting by-election on 8 June.
^{2} Seat of The Murray subsumed in Mount Barker 1863; Allan McFarlane MHA died on 11 March 1864. William Rogers won the resulting by-election on 8 June.
^{3} East Adelaide MHA William Bakewell resigned on 27 October 1864. Thomas Reynolds won the resulting by-election on 5 November.
