= William Everard (South Australian politician) =

Australian politician

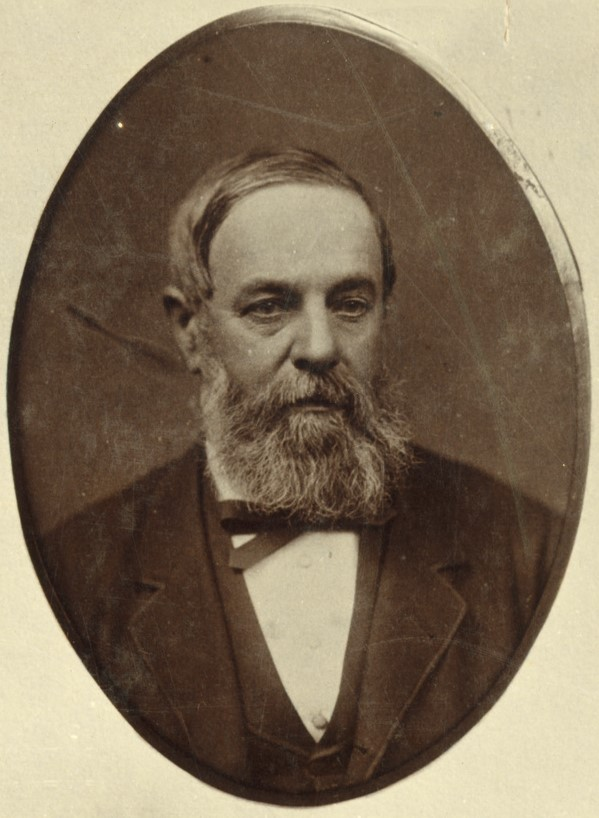

William Edward Everard (December 1819 – 25 August 1889) was a South Australian businessman and politician.

Everard was the son of Dr. Charles George Everard (1794–1876) and his wife Catherine (1786–1866), originally of London.

The family, which included his mother and brothers Charles John Everard (ca.1822 – 22 July 1892) and James George (died 3 May 1840, aged 15), arrived in Adelaide on the ship Africaine under Captain John Finlay Duff in 1836. His father was one of the first eighteen elected to South Australia's unicameral Legislative Council in 1839.

By 1843 William and his brother Charles were farming a jointly owned property in Myponga, while Dr. C. G. Everard was developing his properties "Ashford" and "Marshfield", to the west and east of the Bay Road respectively, and comprising much of the land between Keswick and Glenelg. Dr. Everard was the first colonist to grow wheat, on one of his City selections on Morphett Street.

== Business ==
- For twenty years he was a Director of the National Bank
- Director of the Trust and Agency Company
- Director and for a time chairman of South Australian Mutual Life Assurance Society
- Chairman of the Board of Directors of the City of Adelaide Land and Investment Co. Ltd.
- Director of Adelaide, Payneham and Paradise Tramway Company
- Director and Chairman of Adelaide and Goodwood Tramway Company
- Director and Chairman City of Adelaide Land and Investment Co. Ltd.
- connected with the Largs Bay Land and Investment Company
- associated with Lavington Glyde, Abraham Abrahams, and other gentlemen in working the well-known Talisker Mine
- He was one of the original purchasers of town acres, and the family held a large area of city property. The land on which the Bank of New South Wales and the Adelaide Club now stand belonged to Everard at one time, and also the acre now occupied by the Government Offices in Victoria Square.

== Civic, cultural and charitable activities ==
He was appointed Justice of the Peace in 1863 He was a member of

- Board of South Australian Institute from 1869 then the Public Library, Art Gallery and Museum
- Council of Adelaide University from its inception in 1874 until his death
- Board of Management of the Botanic Gardens from 1865
- Central Road Board from 1863 to 1868
- Unitarian Christian Church. In 1889 he sold to the Church trustees a portion of his city Section 302 on Wakefield Street, valued by the Commissioner of Taxes at £3,000, for the reduced sum of £560 and allowed an additional £150 off this for the Building Fund. He also contributed generously towards the minister's stipend and travelling costs of the first minister (Rev. J. Crawford Woods). He was a member of several Church charitable committees alongside Mrs. Everard was on a committee with Emily Clark, Mrs. J. C. Woods, Mrs. William Kay, Miss Kate Kay and Catherine Helen Spence.

== Politics ==
Everard was elected to the South Australian House of Assembly for the district of Encounter Bay on 6 March 1865, succeeding John Lindsay, along with David Sutherland.

At the general election of 1868, Everard was returned for the same constituency, this time with Neville Blyth

Everard did not stand for the sixth Parliament, then was returned to his old seat in December 1871, with Thomas Reynolds as his colleague. He was unseated on petition in February 1872 by the Court of Disputed Returns, which ended his connection with the Assembly.

Fourteen months later, Everard was elected a member of the Legislative Council, in company with Sir Henry Ayers, Alexander Hay, T. Hogarth, J. Fisher, R. A. Tarlton, and Walter Duffield, and continued as one of the eighteen members of the Upper House, who were elected by the whole province acting as one electoral district, until he vacated his seat on 1 August 1878.

While a member of parliament, Everard served in three Ministries:

- As Commissioner of Public Works in the Hart Administration, which was formed in September 1868, then in the Ayers Ministry on 13 October following. Besides John Hart, his colleagues in that short-lived Ministry were Neville Blyth, J. T. Bagot and W. Townsend.
- From 22 July 1873 to 3 June 1875, Everard was Commissioner of Crown Lands and Immigration in the Arthur Blyth Ministry. His other colleagues in that Ministry, at various times, were the Crown Solicitor (Hon. C. Mann, Q.C.), Mr. Justice Bundey, and the Hons. J. C. Bray, G. C. Hawker, H. E. Bright, and Lavington Glyde.
- When Boucaut reconstructed his Cabinet on 25 March 1876, Everard was included as Minister of Education, succeeding Ebenezer Ward.

His obituary in the South Australian Register noted:

"Although his career as a politician was not distinguished in any special manner, Mr. Everard was undoubtedly an Independent and honest member and a hard working and trustworthy Minister of the Crown. In every sense of the word he proved himself a worthy citizen and colonist."

== Recognition ==
The Hundred of Everard (County of Stanley), the locality of Everard Central, Mount Everard in the Musgrave Ranges, Lake Everard (near Lake Gairdner) and Everard Creek (now the Diamantina River) were named for William.

== Family ==
5 March 1857, at Hanover Square, he married Maria Hughes (19 November 1820 – 21 June 1905), sister of William Hughes F.R.G.S., a well known geographer and author.

Their property "Ashford" of 61 acres (25 ha) on Bay Road is now the suburb of Ashford on the Anzac Highway.

Everard's sister Eliza married her cousin, Ralf Everard Lucy, son of William Lucy and Elizabeth Everard, who died 31 March 1860 in Hillsley near Wotton under Edge, Gloucestershire.

Everard's brother Charles John's first wife, also named Eliza, died 18 September 1850 aged 26; he married again, in Hawkesbury, Gloucestershire, to his cousin Charlotte Everard Lucy, on 23 March 1854. Their home was "Marshfield", a property of 150 acres (61 ha) on the east side of Bay Road (originally owned by Dr. C. G. Everard). His children William Francis (1855–1915), Eliza Catherine (1857–1966) and Rosa Maria (1860–1935) inherited Marshfield, progressively selling off sections to support themselves. Part of the original property is now the suburb of Everard Park. By 1908 the two sisters had been declared insolvent; William Francis Everard's widow disposed of what remained of his share, now a large part of the suburb of Keswick.

Political offices
Preceded by Philip Santo	Commissioner of Public Works; 24 Sep 1868 – 12 Oct 1868	Succeeded by Philip Santo
South Australian House of Assembly
Previous: John Lindsay	Member for Onkaparinga; 1865–1870; Served alongside: David Sutherland, Neville Blyth	Succeeded by Arthur Lindsay
Previous: Emil Wentzel	Member for Onkaparinga; 1871–1872; Served alongside: Thomas Reynolds	Succeeded by William Rogers
