= Agnes Hay =

Agnes Hay may refer to:

- Agnes Duff, Countess Fife (1829–1869), née Agnes Hay, British aristocrat
- Agness Kelly (1818–1870), first wife of Alexander Hay
- Agness Grant Gosse (?-1909), second wife of Alexander Hay
