= Minister of Public Works (South Australia) =

South Australian cabinet minister

Commissioner of Public Works
- Style: The Honourable
- Member of: Cabinet
- Reports to: Parliament
- Appointer: Governor of South Australia
- Term length: At Her Majesty's pleasure
- Formation: 24 October 1856
- First holder: Arthur Freeling
- Final holder: Kym Mayes
- Abolished: 1 October 1992

The Minister of Public Works (known as the Commissioner of Public Works from 1856 until 1944, and as the Minister of Works from 1944 until 1979) was a member of Cabinet of the Government of South Australia.

Originally created for the Finniss Ministry on 24 October 1856, there were 63 holders of the public works portfolio. It was known as Commissioner for Public Works for most of its existence, however since the Playford Government in the 1960s, it was known as Minister for Works or Public Works.

The longest holder was Malcolm McIntosh, a member of the Liberal Federation/Liberal and Country League and a minister in the Butler and Playford governments, who held the portfolio on two separate occasions for a total of 23 years and 45 days. The last holder was Kym Mayes, a member of the Labor Party and a minister in Lynn Arnold's government. The title was abolished on 1 October 1992 and superseded by portfolio's for Infrastructure and Transport.

== List of Commissioner of Public Works of South Australia ==
Order	Minister	Party	Premier	Title	Term start	Term end	Term in office
1	Arthur Freeling	No Party	Finniss	Commissioner of Public Works	24 October 1856	20 March 1857	147 days
2	Samuel Davenport	No Party	Finniss	Commissioner of Public Works	20 March 1857	21 August 1857	154 days
3	Arthur Blyth	No Party	Baker	Commissioner of Public Works	21 August 1857	1 September 1857	11 days
n/a	Samuel Davenport	No Party	Torrens	Commissioner of Public Works	1 September 1857	30 September 1857	29 days
4	Thomas Reynolds	No Party	Hanson	Commissioner of Public Works	30 September 1857	12 June 1858	255 days
n/a	Arthur Blyth	No Party	Hanson	Commissioner of Public Works	12 June 1858	9 May 1860	1 year, 332 days
5	Alexander Hay	No Party	Reynolds	Commissioner of Public Works	9 May 1860	8 October 1861	1 year, 152 days
6	Philip Santo	No Party	Waterhouse	Commissioner of Public Works	8 October 1861	17 October 1861	9 days
7	John Lindsay	No Party	Waterhouse	Commissioner of Public Works	17 October 1861	19 February 1862	125 days
8	William Milne	No Party	Waterhouse	Commissioner of Public Works	19 February 1862	4 July 1863	1 year, 135 days
9	William Townsend	No Party	Dutton	Commissioner of Public Works	4 July 1863	15 July 1863	11 days
n/a	Philip Santo	No Party	Ayers	Commissioner of Public Works	15 July 1863	4 August 1864	1 year, 20 days
n/a	William Milne	No Party	Blyth	Commissioner of Public Works	4 August 1864	22 March 1865	230 days
10	Francis Dutton	No Party	Dutton	Commissioner of Public Works	22 March 1865	20 September 1865	182 days
n/a	Philip Santo	No Party	Ayers	Commissioner of Public Works	20 September 1865	23 October 1865	33 days
11	Thomas English	No Party	Hart	Commissioner of Public Works	23 October 1865	28 March 1866	1 year, 192 days
11	Thomas English	No Party	Boucaut	Commissioner of Public Works	28 March 1866	3 May 1867	1 year, 192 days
n/a	Philip Santo	No Party	Ayers	Commissioner of Public Works	3 May 1867	24 September 1868	1 year, 144 days
12	William Everard	No Party	Hart	Commissioner of Public Works	24 September 1868	12 October 1868	18 days
n/a	Philip Santo	No Party	Ayers	Commissioner of Public Works	13 October 1868	3 November 1868	21 days
13	John Colton	No Party	Strangways	Commissioner of Public Works	3 November 1868	12 May 1870	1 year, 190 days
14	Friedrich Krichauff	No Party	Strangways	Commissioner of Public Works	12 May 1870	30 May 1870	18 days
15	John Carr	No Party	Hart	Commissioner of Public Works	30 May 1870	10 November 1871	1 year, 237 days
15	John Carr	No Party	Blyth	Commissioner of Public Works	10 November 1871	22 January 1872	1 year, 237 days
16	James Ramsay	No Party	Ayers	Commissioner of Public Works	22 January 1872	4 March 1872	42 days
17	Wentworth Cavenagh	No Party	Ayers	Commissioner of Public Works	4 March 1872	22 July 1873	1 year, 140 days
18	Henry Bright	No Party	Blyth	Commissioner of Public Works	22 July 1873	3 June 1875	1 year, 316 days
19	William West-Erskine	No Party	Boucaut	Commissioner of Public Works	3 June 1875	2 February 1876	244 days
20	James Boucaut	No Party	Boucaut	Commissioner of Public Works	2 February 1876	6 June 1876	125 days
21	John Colton	No Party	Colton	Commissioner of Public Works	6 June 1876	26 October 1877	1 year, 142 days
22	George Hawker	No Party	Boucaut	Commissioner of Public Works	26 October 1877	27 September 1878	3 years, 241 days
22	George Hawker	No Party	Morgan	Commissioner of Public Works	27 September 1878	24 June 1881	3 years, 241 days
n/a	James Ramsay	No Party	Bray	Commissioner of Public Works	24 June 1881	23 April 1884	2 years, 304 days
23	David Bower	No Party	Bray	Commissioner of Public Works	23 April 1884	16 June 1884	54 days
24	Thomas Playford II	No Party	Colton	Commissioner of Public Works	16 June 1884	4 February 1885	233 days
25	Jenkin Coles	No Party	Colton	Commissioner of Public Works	4 February 1885	16 June 1885	132 days
26	John Darling	No Party	Downer	Commissioner of Public Works	16 June 1885	14 October 1885	120 days
27	John Spence	No Party	Downer	Commissioner of Public Works	14 October 1885	8 June 1886	237 days
28	Luke Furner	No Party	Downer	Commissioner of Public Works	8 June 1886	11 June 1887	1 year, 3 days
29	Alfred Catt	No Party	Playford II	Commissioner of Public Works	11 June 1887	27 June 1889	2 years, 16 days
30	James Howe	No Party	Cockburn	Commissioner of Public Works	27 June 1889	2 May 1890	309 days
31	Thomas Burgoyne	No Party	Cockburn	Commissioner of Public Works	2 May 1890	19 August 1890	109 days
32	William Rounsevell	No Party	Playford II	Commissioner of Public Works	19 August 1890	6 January 1892	1 year, 140 days
33	John Jenkins	No Party	Playford II	Commissioner of Public Works	6 January 1892	21 June 1892	167 days
34	Andrew Handyside	No Party	Holder	Commissioner of Public Works	21 June 1892	15 October 1892	116 days
35	Lawrence Grayson	No Party	Downer	Commissioner of Public Works	15 October 1892	12 May 1893	209 days
No Holder			Downer	Commissioner of Public Works	12 May 1893	16 June 1893	35 days
36	Frederick Holder	Liberalism	Kingston	Commissioner of Public Works	16 June 1893	17 April 1894	305 days
37	John Jenkins	Liberalism	Kingston	Commissioner of Public Works	17 April 1894	1 December 1899	5 years, 228 days
n/a	Andrew Handyside	No Party	Solomon	Commissioner of Public Works	1 December 1899	8 December 1899	7 days
38	Richard Foster	No Party	Holder	Commissioner of Public Works	8 December 1899	15 May 1901	4 years, 209 days
38	Richard Foster	No Party	Jenkins	Commissioner of Public Works	15 May 1901	4 July 1904	4 years, 209 days
No Holder			Jenkins	Commissioner of Public Works	4 July 1904	1 March 1905	240 days
n/a	Richard Foster	No Party	Butler	Commissioner of Public Works	1 March 1905	26 July 1905	147 days
39	Thomas Price	Labor	Price	Commissioner of Public Works	26 July 1905	5 June 1909	3 years, 314 days
40	Laurence O'Loughlin	Farmers & Producers Union	Peake	Commissioner of Public Works	5 June 1909	3 June 1910	363 days
41	John Verran	Labor	Verran	Commissioner of Public Works	3 June 1910	17 February 1912	1 year, 259 days
42	Richard Butler	Liberal Union	Peake	Commissioner of Public Works	17 February 1912	19 November 1914	2 years, 275 days
43	George Ritchie	Liberal Union	Peake	Commissioner of Public Works	19 November 1914	3 April 1915	135 days
44	Harry Jackson	Labor	Vaughan	Commissioner of Public Works	3 April 1915	14 July 1917	2 years, 102 days
45	John Bice	Liberal Union	Peake	Commissioner of Public Works	14 July 1917	15 May 1919	1 year, 305 days
46	George Ritchie	Liberal Union	Peake	Commissioner of Public Works	15 May 1919	8 April 1920	329 days
47	William Hague	Liberal Union	Barwell	Commissioner of Public Works	8 April 1920	3 November 1922	2 years, 209 days
48	Thomas Pascoe	Liberal Union	Barwell	Commissioner of Public Works	3 November 1922	16 October 1923	1 year, 11 days
48	Thomas Pascoe	Liberal Federation	Barwell	Commissioner of Public Works	16 October 1923	14 November 1923	1 year, 11 days
49	George Jenkins	Liberal Federation	Barwell	Commissioner of Public Works	14 November 1923	16 April 1924	154 days
50	Lionel Hill	Labor	Gunn	Commissioner of Public Works	16 April 1924	28 August 1926	2 years, 134 days
51	John McInnes	Labor	Hill	Commissioner of Public Works	28 August 1926	8 April 1927	223 days
52	Malcolm McIntosh	Liberal Federation	Butler	Commissioner of Public Works	8 April 1927	17 April 1930	3 years, 9 days
n/a	John McInnes	Labor	Hill	Commissioner of Public Works	17 April 1930	13 February 1933	3 years, 1 day
n/a	John McInnes	Labor	Richards	Commissioner of Public Works	13 February 1933	18 April 1933	64 days
53	Herbert Hudd	Liberal & Country League	Butler	Commissioner of Public Works	18 April 1933	8 April 1938	4 years, 355 days
n/a	Malcolm McIntosh	Liberal & Country League	Playford	Commissioner of Public Works	8 April 1938	14 December 1944	20 years, 36 days
n/a	Malcolm McIntosh	Liberal & Country League	Playford	Minister for Works	14 December 1944	14 May 1958	20 years, 36 days
54	Colin Rowe	Liberal & Country League	Playford	Minister for Works	14 May 1958	25 June 1958	42 days
55	Glen Pearson	Liberal & Country League	Playford	Minister for Works	25 June 1958	10 March 1965	6 years, 258 days
56	Cyril Hutchens	Labor	Walsh	Minister for Works	10 March 1965	1 June 1967	3 years, 38 days
56	Cyril Hutchens	Labor	Dunstan	Minister for Works	1 June 1967	17 April 1968	3 years, 38 days
57	John Coumbe	Liberal & Country League	Hall	Minister for Works	17 April 1968	2 March 1970	1 year, 319 days
58	Allan Rodda	Liberal & Country League	Hall	Minister for Works	2 March 1970	2 June 1970	92 days
59	Des Corcoran	Labor	Dunstan	Minister for Works	2 June 1970	15 February 1979	8 years, 286 days
59	Des Corcoran	Labor	Corcoran	Minister for Works	15 February 1979	15 March 1979	8 years, 286 days
60	John Wright	Labor	Corcoran	Minister for Public Works	15 March 1979	18 September 1979	187 days
61	Dean Brown	Liberal	Tonkin	Minister for Public Works	18 September 1979	10 November 1982	3 years, 53 days
n/a	John Wright	Labor	Bannon	Minister for Public Works	10 November 1982	19 February 1984	1 year, 101 days
62	Terry Hemmings	Labor	Bannon	Minister for Public Works	19 February 1984	14 December 1989	5 years, 298 days
63	Kym Mayes	Labor	Bannon	Minister for Public Works	14 December 1989	4 September 1992	2 years, 292 days
63	Kym Mayes	Labor	Arnold	Minister for Public Works	4 September 1992	1 October 1992	2 years, 292 days
