= Arthur Fydell Lindsay =

Australian politician

Arthur Fydell Lindsay (c. 1816 – 10 May 1895) was a politician in the early days of the colony of South Australia.

== History ==
Lindsay was born in Boston, Lincolnshire, and emigrated to South Australia on HMS Buffalo arriving in December 1836 in company with Governor Hindmarsh, James Hurtle Fisher (the Resident Commissioner), Osmond Gilles (Treasurer), and the Rev. C. B. Howard (Colonial Chaplain), and was present at the proclamation of the province under the historic gum tree at Glenelg.

Lindsay was trained as a surveyor and worked in that profession for a number of years, notably laying out the town of Hindmarsh for the Governor (who with his wife personally owned the land) in a partnership with the Governor's son John as "Lindsay & Hindmarsh". In July 1839 they transferred ownership of the land to A. F. Lindsay and George Milner Stephen. then took up a farm in the Encounter Bay district.

Lindsay served as the first member of the House of Assembly for the single-person electorate of Encounter Bay for the terms March 1857 – April 1860, when his colleagues were Benjamin Herschel Babbage and Henry Strangways. He was succeeded by (the unrelated) John Lindsay, then served the same electorate April 1870 – December 1871, with Emil Wentzel; and September 1873 – April 1878, with William Rogers and James Boucaut. He argued strongly for the construction of light railways on the narrow gauge system, but received little support, though he was later largely vindicated.

He donated land for St. Augustine's church at Victor Harbor (he also gave land for the Methodist and Presbyterian churches), and was their third lay reader, serving in that position for over twenty years.

== Family ==
Lindsay married Charlotte Henrietta Leworthy (c. 1823 – 6 February 1915) on 20 July 1852; they had a farm "Edyell" in Victor Harbor. Their children included:

- Beatrice Mary Charlotte Lindsay (27 May 1853 – 28 November 1949) married William Hope Ross ( – 27 April 1929) on 29 April 1874
- Helen Georgina Fydell Lindsay ( – 2 June 1925) married Aubrey Percival Gwynne (c. 1860 – c. 30 May 1930) on 21 April 1896. Gwynne was a member of the 1891 Royal Geographical Society "Elder Expedition" to Central Australia under David Lindsay (not closely related) He died a virtual recluse.
- Betana Caroline Lindsay (22 September 1861 – 30 April 1943) married Edgar J Salom (c. 1873 – 6 July 1898). She ran a rest home in North Adelaide.
- Arthur Reginald Fydell Lindsay (30 November 1863 – 27 September 1913) was member of SAJC and ARC.
- Gertrude Theodora Fydell Lindsay ( – 1 April 1946) married Dr. Robert Walter Stewart (c. 1849 – 11 November 1921)

- Eleanor Charlotte "Nora" Stewart (1879-1966), ballet teacher

- Clarice M. Amelia Fydell Lindsay ( – 25 June 1941) married Horace James Page (1856 – December 1936) on 22 December 1915

His brother, solicitor Richard Fydell Lindsay (c. 1819 – 13 July 1861) married Isabella Leworthy (c. 1829 – 29 March 1905). He was convicted for assaulting John Hindmarsh (son of Governor Hindmarsh) in November 1860.

He was not related to John Lindsay, who followed him as a representative for Encounter Bay.
