= Charles Lindsay (Australian politician) =

Australian politician

Charles Lindsay (c. 1812 – 11 December 1884) was a Scottish pastoralist and politician in the young colony of South Australia.

He was elected to the Adelaide Philosophical Society in August 1859 and appointed Justice of the Peace in 1862.

He was MHA for Flinders from November 1862 to February 1865, whereupon he left for England, never to return. He built a mansion on the family property in Lanarkshire. He died in London.

His brother John Lindsay was MHA for Encounter Bay from 1860 to 1865.
