= Samuel Davenport (Australian politician) =

Australian politician

Sir Samuel Davenport KCMG
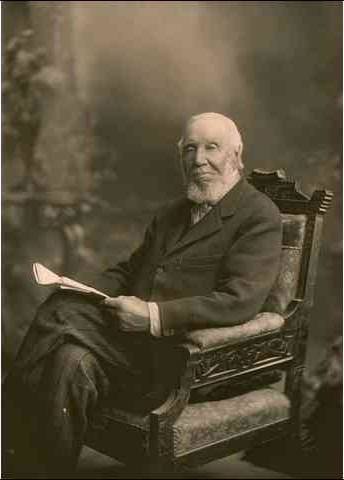

South Australian Commissioner of Public Works
- In office 20 March 1857 – 21 August 1857
- Premier: Boyle Finniss
- Preceded by: Arthur Freeling
- Succeeded by: Arthur Blyth
- In office 1 September 1857 – 30 September 1857
- Premier: Robert Torrens
- Preceded by: Arthur Blyth
- Succeeded by: Thomas Reynolds

Personal details
- Born: 5 March 1818 Shirburn, Oxfordshire, England
- Died: 3 September 1906 (aged 88) Beaumont, South Australia
- Spouse: Margaret Fraser
- Parent(s): George Davenport and Jane Devereux, née Davies

Sir Samuel Davenport KCMG (5 March 1818 – 3 September 1906) was an early settler of South Australia, a landowner and member of parliament.

== Life ==
Davenport was the fourth son of George Davenport, a wealthy English banker, and his wife Jane Devereux, née Davies, and was educated at Mill Hill School in North London. His father became an agent of the South Australia Company in England and together with partners Frederick Luck (quarter share) and Roger Cunliffe (one-eighth share) contracted to paid £4416 for a special survey of 4,416 acres (17.87 km^{2}) in South Australia, and sent his eldest son (George) Francis Davenport to select the land. Francis and his second wife Sarah Davenport (née Fincher) arrived in Adelaide in February 1840 aboard Rajasthan. After initially considering land near Port Lincoln, he selected land later referred to as "Three Brothers", on the upper reaches of the River Angas, including what is now the town of Macclesfield. Francis returned to England in 1841, leaving Henry Giles to manage his affairs.

Davenport married Margaret Fraser Cleland (1821 – 6 February 1902) on 1 June 1842. She became known for her charitable work, closely associated with Emily Clark, Lady Colton and Catherine Helen Spence. Samuel, his wife and brother Robert (1816–1896) arrived in Adelaide from Hobart aboard Adelaide in February 1843. Francis and Sarah returned to Adelaide aboard Rajusthan in February 1843. He died at the Rundle Street home of William Giles on 8 April 1843. The remaining brothers lived at Macclesfield and managed the survey. Samuel continued to receive an annual allowance from his father.

Davenport's first ventures in Australia were in mixed farming, almonds and vines, which had sparked his interest when he was in the south of France as a youth. He then tried sheep-farming with approximately 6000 sheep, but disease killed half of them. In 1860 he bought land near Port Augusta, and turned to ranching horses and cattle. He realised from his success that large-stock holdings made healthy profits in South Australia.

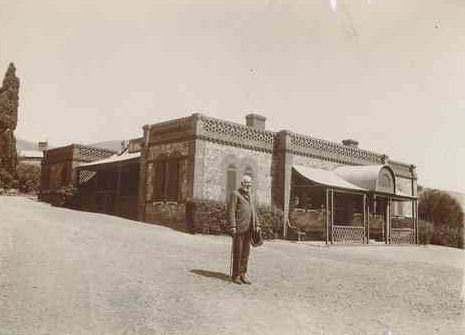
Davenport at Beaumont House during 1880.

From 1849 he lived mostly at his home in Beaumont, in his residence of Beaumont House, which he owned from 1851 onwards. He continued to manage the Macclesfield property, providing attractive rental terms for his tenants.

Between 5 May 1846 and 1 July 1848, Davenport was a non-official nominated member of the South Australian Legislative Council. Between 1849 and 1852 he served as a city commissioner. He contested the Legislative Council seat of Hindmarsh without success in a by-election during 1854, but on 25 October 1855 was nominated to the part-elective Legislative Council. He was eventually elected to the first Legislative Council under responsible government in 1857 and administered the oath of allegiance to the councillors on 22 April 1857. He served a number of ministries; however he resigned from the council on 25 September 1866.

Davenport strongly promoted agriculture and other new industries in South Australia. Between 1864 and 1872 he published a number of pamphlets, three of them dealing with the cultivation of olives and manufacture of olive oil, silk and tobacco. Davenport grew both olives and silk on his Beaumont House estate. He was a member of the Royal Agricultural and Horticultural Society and its president 1873–1879 and 1890–1891. He was a member of the South Australian Institute's Board of Governors.

He was elected to a number of positions in the agricultural, horticultural and geographical societies, include the American Philosophical Society in 1876. He was also a successful banker like his English father.

Davenport was knighted during 1884 and in 1886 appointed KCMG and given an honorary doctorate by the University of Cambridge. After his death in 1906, obituarists praised his 'honourable record both in public and private life' and both Houses of Parliament were adjourned for his funeral.

The South Australian Assembly seat of Davenport was later named after him.

Political offices
Preceded by Arthur Freeling	Commissioner of Public Works; 20 Mar – 21 Aug 1857	Succeeded by Arthur Blyth
Preceded by Arthur Blyth	Commissioner of Public Works; 1 Sep – 30 Sep 1857	Succeeded by Thomas Reynolds
