= Alexander Hay (South Australian politician) =

Australian politician

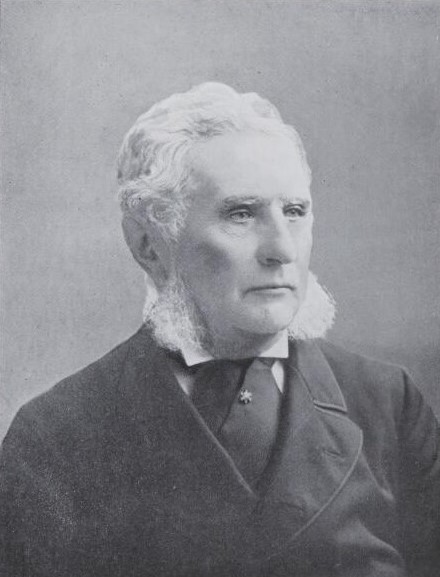

South Australian Commissioner of Public Works
- In office 9 May 1860 – 8 October 1861
- Premier: Thomas Reynolds
- Preceded by: Arthur Blyth
- Succeeded by: Philip Santo

Personal details
- Born: 12 January 1820 Dunfermline, Scotland
- Died: 4 February 1898 (aged 78) Victor Harbor, South Australia
- Spouse(s): Agnes Kelly (1845-1870); Agnes Gosse (1872-1898)
- Occupation: Merchant, pastoralist, politician

Alexander Hay (12 January 1820 – 4 February 1898) was a South Australian merchant, pastoralist and politician.

== Early career ==
Born in Dunfermline, Scotland, as a young man he gained free passage to South Australia when working as a "wharfer", arriving in May 1839. After working for only two years for the South Australia Company, he could afford to purchase his own land to farm at Gumeracha. He soon acquired or invested in extensive pastoral land holdings throughout south-eastern Australia. He opened a grocery and hardware store on Rundle Street in the Adelaide city centre, specialising in supplying tools and equipment to the new copper mines and the booming building industry. He also became a proprietor of the newspaper the South Australian Register, a director of two insurance companies, two banks, a gas company and a wharf company. He served as vice-president of the Adelaide Zoo, president of the YMCA, an Adelaide City Councillor. He founded the Caledonian Society of South Australia, and was its Chief 1881–1883. He was married to Agnes Kelly in Adelaide in 1845, with whom he had eight children (only four survived to adulthood, a son and three daughters).

== Political career ==
In 1857, Hay was elected to the district of Gumeracha in the South Australian House of Assembly. He almost became Premier in 1868, after a collapse in support from farmers resulted in the dissolution of the existing ministry. The Governor invited Hay, as the leader of the liberal land reformers and the only candidate with a clear policy, to form a ministry, but Hay refused. He was asked again the following month, and accepted but was unsuccessful in securing sufficient support.

Except for a five-year break between 1861 and 1866 during which he took his family on a trip to England and had his Beaumont home, "Linden", rebuilt, he served the Parliament until 1890, being elected to the Legislative Council in 1873 and again in 1882.

He is remembered for his commonsense, his support of industry, farmers, and young entrepreneurs, and his steadfast support of free primary education. He is particularly noteworthy for his role as proposer and chairman of the Select Committee on Education in 1868, which recommended a secular and compulsory system (which became law seven years later). He was also a noted supporter of an Adelaide to Darwin railway.

Agnes Hay died in 1870 and was buried in West Terrace Cemetery. Hay married Agnes Grant Gosse in 1872, with whom he soon had four more children.

== Later life ==
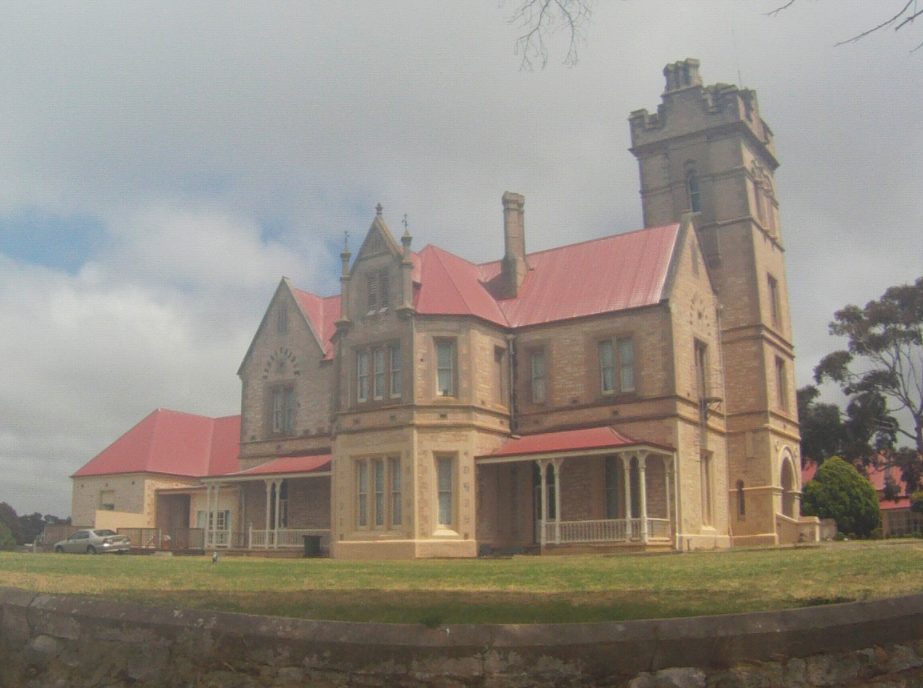
In 1879, Hay commissioned the Mt Breckan mansion.

Hay began building a summer residence at Victor Harbor in 1879. In 1881, the Mount Breckan mansion, one of the largest residences in Australia at that time, was completed.

Hay died at Mount Breckan in January 1898. A memorial window in St. Augustine's Church, Victor Harbor, was erected in his memory.

== Children ==
Alexander had twelve children, eight between 1846 and 1858 by his first wife Agnes, née Kelly (1818–1870, married 1845), and four between 1873 and 1877 by his second wife Agnes Grant, née Gosse (1837–1909, married 1872).

=== Agnes Kelly ===
Agnes Kelly (1818–1870) was a bonnet maker in Balhannah in the Adelaide Hills. She had arrived in South Australia in September 1840. In 1845 (aged 27) she married Alexander Hay. Within a short time they had eight children. As was very common in those days, four of their children died before their third birthday. Agnes Hay died on 3 August 1870, aged only fifty-three. She was buried at the West Terrace Cemetery where four of her children had already been buried.

Their children were:

- Peter (1846–1848)
- Agnes (1848–1849)
- Margaret (1849–1916) married John Henry Luxmoore on 10 November 1870. They lived at "Saltram", Glenelg
- Susan (1850–1851)
- Mary (1852–1891)
- Agnes (Aggie) Hay (1854–1933) married William Christie Gosse on 22 December 1874. William Christie Gosse was the brother of Alexander's second wife Agnes Grant Hay née Gosse. Aggie and William had 3 children:
  - William Hay Gosse MC (1875–1918) was killed in action in France. He married Muriel, née Davidson, who died in 1920. Their son George Gosse (1912–1964) was awarded the George Cross in 1946;
  - Sir James Hay Gosse (1876–1952) married Joanna Lang, daughter of Tom Elder Barr Smith – they had a daughter and four sons; and
  - Edith Agnes Gosse (1878-)
- James (1855–1908)
- Helen (1858–1861)

=== Agnes Grant Gosse ===
Agnes Grant Gosse (1837–1909) married Alexander Hay in March 1872 (aged 35). He had been introduced to Agnes Gosse at a function in 1867 at which the Gosse family had also been present.

Agnes was the eldest daughter of Dr William Gosse (1812–1883) and Agnes née Grant (1811–1891). Their six children were:

- Agnes Grant Gosse (1837–1909) – married Alexander Hay – 4 children
- William Christie Gosse (1842–1881) – in 1874 married Aggie Hay (1854–1933), his sister's step-daughter – 3 children
- Mary – married Alexander Melville
- Charles Gosse (1849–1885) studied medicine – married Mary, daughter of Hon. G. C. Hawker
- David – married Emily Fenn
- Henry – married Elizabeth Clark

As well as being Hay's second wife, and having the benefits of the Gosse family heritage, Agnes Grant Hay was an author. Her works include:

- After-glow memories by Anglo-Australian, London : Methuen & Co., 1905 NLA catalogue entry
- Malcolm Canmore's Pearl by Agnes Grant Hay, 1907
- Archibald Menzies, mystic by Agnes Hay Grant, London : John Milne, 1908 NLA catalogue entry
- Ober-Ammergau, and its great passion drama of 1900 by Agnes Grant Hay : Elliot Stock, 1902, (illustrated) 1903.NLA catalogue entry
- Footprints: A Memoir of the Late Alexander Hay, one of the Fathers and Early Colonists of South Australia by his widow. London : Elliot Stock, 1899. NLA catalogue entry

Works written about her include:

- A Lady at Sea : the adventures of Agnes Grant Hay by Anthony Laube, 2001

Hay and his second wife had four children:

- Gertrude Hay (1873–1952) married Dr. Philip Gosse on 14 July 1908. Philip was author of The Pirates Who's Who
- Alexander Gosse Hay (1874–1901)
- William Gosse Hay (1875–1945) was an author. He married Mary Violet Williams, daughter of Rev. Francis Williams on 26 October 1901.
- Helen "Dolly" Hay (1877–1909), the youngest daughter, and her mother, second wife Agnes Grant née Gosse, were lost at sea on the ill-fated SS Waratah.

A reversible lectern was erected in St Augustine's Church, Victor Harbor, in memory of Agnes Grant and Helen Hay.

Political offices
| Preceded by Arthur Blyth | Commissioner of Public Works; 9 May 1860 – 8 Oct 1861 | Succeeded by Philip Santo |
South Australian House of Assembly
| New district | Member for Gumeracha; 1857 – 1860; Served alongside: Arthur Blyth | Succeeded by Alexander Murray |
| Preceded by Alexander Murray | Member for Gumeracha; 1867 – 1870; Served alongside: Arthur Blyth, William Sandover | Succeeded by Ebenezer Ward |
| Preceded by Daniel Fisher | Member for East Torrens; 1870 – 1871; Served alongside: Henry Mildred, Jr. | Succeeded by George Stevenson |
