= Emil Wentzel =

Australian politician

Emil August Edward Wentzel (c. 1817 – 23 February 1892) was a timber merchant and politician in the colony of South Australia.

Emil emigrated to South Australia on the Hermann von Beckerath from Bremen, Germany, arriving in December 1847.

He worked for a time as surveyor and engineer with the Central Road Board, but in 1852, after numerous complaints and several jobs which cost significantly more than budgeted for, he was dismissed from the service. He thereupon set himself up as a timber merchant on East Terrace, Adelaide, and grew quite wealthy.

Emil Wentzel was MHA for Encounter Bay from April 1870 – December 1871. His term in parliament was remarkable for a deputation from his electorate calling for his resignation. He was not a candidate at the subsequent election. He returned to Baden-Baden, Germany, where he died.

He was married but had no children, his wife surviving him. His will provided, after the death of his wife, for the establishment of two educational endowments: The Emil Wentzel endowment for students at the Royal Prussian Academy of Arts at Berlin and The Emil Wentzel endowment for students at the Royal Prussian High School for Technology at Berlin. Half the recipients were to be German and half South Australian, but only to go to students of some means, as he did not want to fund a charity.
