= Philip Santo =

Australian politician (1818–1889)

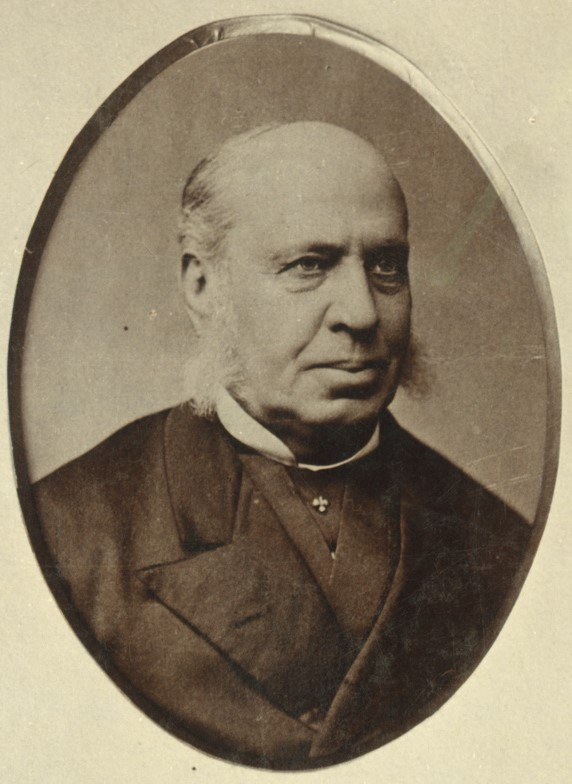

South Australian Commissioner of Public Works
- In office 8 October 1861 – 17 October 1861
- Premier: George Waterhouse
- Preceded by: Alexander Hay
- Succeeded by: John Lindsay
- In office 15 July 1863 – 4 August 1864
- Premier: Henry Ayers
- Preceded by: William Townsend
- Succeeded by: William Milne
- In office 20 September 1865 – 23 October 1865
- Premier: Henry Ayers
- Preceded by: Francis Dutton
- Succeeded by: Thomas English
- In office 3 May 1867 – 24 September 1868
- Premier: Henry Ayers
- Preceded by: Thomas English
- Succeeded by: William Everard
- In office 13 October 1868 – 3 November 1868
- Premier: Henry Ayers
- Preceded by: William Everard
- Succeeded by: John Colton

Personal details
- Born: 7 August 1818; Saltash, Cornwall, England
- Died: 17 December 1889 (aged 71); Adelaide, South Australia
- Spouse: Elizabeth Pean

Philip Santo (7 August 1818 – 17 December 1889) was a South Australian politician and businessman.

== History ==
Santo was born on 7 August 1818, at Saltash, and trained to be a carpenter. At age 22, he left for South Australia on the ship Brightman, arriving in Adelaide in December 1840. He worked as a builder in Adelaide, then Burra. He moved to Melbourne during the rush to the Victorian goldfields but soon returned to set up a shop in Grote Street near Victoria Square in 1857, then Waymouth Street from 1866, then from 1873 as Philip Santo & Co in Waymouth Street and Lipson Street Port Adelaide; initially selling timber. then building materials then general hardware, riverboats and ships. By 1880, they had diversified into such disparate goods as patent medicines, perfumes and flavourings, American waggons, brooms, "kerosine", "gasoline" and cabinet organs. He was reported as the 1867 purchaser of Levi & Watt's newly-completed warehouse at 96 King William Street (now the site of the Commonwealth Bank) which became a warehouse for drapery wholesaler D. & W. Murray, but it appears he was acting for one T. Martin, an English investor.

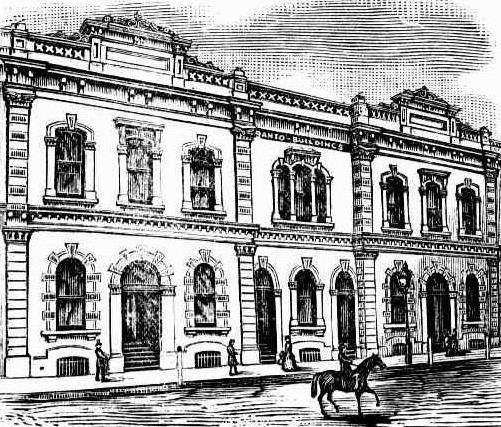
Santo's Buildings, Waymouth Street, Adelaide

In 1880, his company erected a new building on Waymouth Street, designed by architect D. Garlick. Tenants included Conigrave & Collison, agents and patent attorneys, and the S.A. Chamber of Manufactures. Santo's company ceased advertising around 1890.

Santo was elected to the South Australian House of Assembly in 1860 for the City of Adelaide district, 1862 and 1865 for East Adelaide then in 1868 for Barossa and was appointed Commissioner of Public works on a number of occasions for various periods, first in the Waterhouse cabinet, then with Henry Ayers to 1868. He lost his seat in 1870, during which year he was elected to the Legislative Council and held that seat for 10 years.

He was an active member of the Christian Church, of which Rev. Thomas Playford and Herbert Hussey were contemporary adherents, and as an Elder frequently preached in their chapels in Grote Street and Bentham Street.

He had residences "Clapham Park" in Mitcham and "Fernleigh House" on West Terrace, Adelaide, where he died on 17 December 1889, aged 71.

South Australian House of Assembly
Preceded by Boyle Finniss	Member for City of Adelaide; 1860 – 1862; Served alongside: Thomas Reynolds, James Boucaut, Matthew Moorhouse. Samuel Bakewell, William Parkin	District abolished
New district	Member for East Adelaide; 1862 – 1868; Served alongside: Thomas Reynolds, William Bakewell	Succeeded by Robert Cottrell
Preceded by James Martin	Member for Barossa; 1868 – 1870; Served alongside: Richard Baker	Succeeded by Walter Duffield
Government offices
Preceded by Alexander Hay	Commissioner of Public Works; 8 Oct 1861 – 17 Oct 1861	Succeeded by John Lindsay
Preceded by William Townsend	Commissioner of Public Works; 15 Jul 1863 – 4 Aug 1864	Succeeded by William Milne
Preceded by Francis Dutton	Commissioner of Public Works; 20 Sep 1865 – 23 Oct 1865	Succeeded by Thomas English
Preceded by Thomas English	Commissioner of Public Works; 3 May 1867 – 24 Sep 1868	Succeeded by William Everard
Preceded by William Everard	Commissioner of Public Works; 13 Oct 1868 – 3 Nov 1868	Succeeded by John Colton
