= John Lindsay (South Australian politician) =

Australian politician

John Lindsay (c. 1821 – 15 May 1898) was a South Australian businessman and politician.

== History ==
The son of house builder and architect David Lindsay (1780 - 1866) & Helen née Hastie (1784 - 1865), John born in Scotland Mar. 3rd. 1822. In Lanark, Lanarkshire, Scotland, he was baptised Mar. 24th. 1822. John received a good education in Scotland. At age 18 he moved to Liverpool, where he worked for the North and South Wales Bank then the shipping firm of Rankine, Gilmour, & Co. (Gilmour, Rankin, Strong, and Co.?) and prospered, but was inclined to travel, and sailed to America, where he worked for a few years before leaving for South Australia on the Rialto, when he formed a friendship with George Main ( – 6 January 1905), whose brother owned the ship. The two formed a partnership as merchants in 1853, then joined with John Acraman (1829 – 22 June 1907) in January 1855 to found Acraman, Main, Lindsay, & Co., with offices in Currie Street. The company had diverse interests, from coastal and River Murray shipping (their steamers were the Culgoa, Kennedy, Sturt and Leichardt) and insurance to pastoral management, having runs in the Gawler Ranges and the west of the colony.

In 1869 Lindsay partially removed from the company's activities with the formation of a second company Acraman, Main, & Co., but Acraman, Main, Lindsay, & Co. continued to trade until around 1870. He was a director of the South Australian Gas Company 1870 to 1873. In 1873 he opened a business in Port Darwin and Palmerston as shipping agent and merchant, stocking a small range of foodstuffs and beverages, and agent for Adelaide Marine and Fire Assurance Co. and Mercantile Marine Insurance Co., he may also have acquired a large interest in land in the Northern Territory and gold mining at Yam Creek. The tropics did not agree with his health, and he only stayed up north a few months; he sold up in 1878. He was Secretary of the National Marine Insurance Co. of South Australia in Waymouth Street from 1877 to 1881 when it folded, and the Adelaide Life Assurance and Guarantee Company from 1879, as secretary then manager, a position he still held when he died.

== Politics ==
He was elected to the South Australian House of Assembly for Encounter Bay on 5 April 1860, with the H. B. T. Strangways as his colleague, and re-elected in 1862 with David Sutherland, while his brother, Charles Lindsay was a member for Flinders. He was succeeded in Encounter Bay by William Everard. John Lindsay next represented Sturt from May 1870 to November 1871, with William Townsend as his colleague. For a brief period (17 October 1861 – 19 February 1862), he was Commissioner of Public Works in the Waterhouse Ministry, with H. B. T. Strangways, Thomas Reynolds and Randolph Isham Stow.

== Other activities ==
Lindsay was a charter member of the first golf club founded in Adelaide, in company with David Murray, John Gordon, J. T. Turnbull, George and Joseph Boothby and around 15 others. An inaugural game of 14 holes was played on the Adelaide Racecourse (later renamed Victoria Racecourse) on 15 May 1870, when Lindsay and John Gordon tied for first place.

He never married, and his only relatives were a sister in Scotland, a brother or nephew in America, and Charles Lindsay (died 1884), MHA for Flinders 1862 to 1865. His friends were few, but strong and loyal: Commissioner of Police William John Peterswald, George Downer and John Hodgkiss.

For the last thirty years of his life his home was an apartment of the Pier Hotel, Glenelg, with a balcony facing the sea. Until his last illness he never missed a morning dip in the sea, no matter what the weather, and every Sunday he would walk from Glenelg to Hodgkiss's place in Brighton and bring back flowers from his friend's garden.

== Recognition ==
- Point Lindsay, to the west of Streaky Bay, was named for him by Captain Douglas.

Political offices
Preceded by Philip Santo	Commissioner of Public Works; 17 Oct 1861 – 19 Feb 1862	Succeeded by William Milne
South Australian House of Assembly
Previous: Arthur Lindsay	Member for Encounter Bay; 1860–1865; Served alongside: Henry Strangways, David Sutherland	Succeeded by William Everard
Preceded by Joseph Fisher	Member for The Sturt; 1870–1871; Served alongside: William Townsend	Succeeded by John Barrow
