= William Rogers (Australian politician) =

Australian politician (1818–1903)

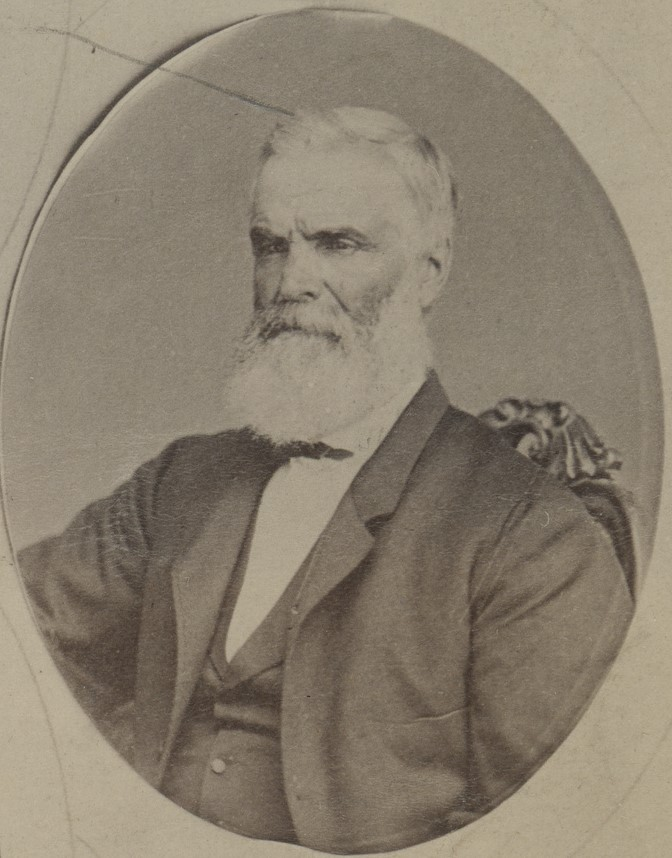
Rogers ca. 1872

William Rogers (22 July 1818 – 26 August 1903) was a politician in the early days of the colony of South Australia.

== History ==
William Rogers, a builder and stonemason, emigrated from Cornwall to South Australia on the Platina, arriving in July 1839. He settled in the Sandergrove district, and was responsible for a large number of constructions in the area, including John Dunn's flour mill at Mount Barker. His brother Joseph also emigrated, joining him in 1847. He acquired some property and began breeding sheep. When William Bowman left the Finniss district around 1878, Rogers purchased his property "View Bank" and later had a share in Portee station on the River Murray near Blanchetown and another at Swan Reach. He made his elder son manager (later owner) of Finniss, and gave Portee and Swan Reach stations to younger son Edwin. They sustained heavy losses in the 1890s drought, but survived and had largely recovered financially at the time of his death.

He was a member of the first fully elected House of Assembly, representing Mount Barker from September 1858 to March 1860 and June 1864 to March 1865 as a colleague of John Dunn. He held the same seat from May 1868 to August 1868 and November 1868 to April 1870 with John Cheriton then Encounter Bay from February 1872 to February 1875, when his colleagues were in turn Thomas Reynolds and Arthur Fydell Lindsay.

== Family ==
Rogers married Ann Wright (ca.1818 – 17 February 1912) on 7 March 1846. She had arrived in South Australia in 1839 on the City of Adelaide; their children included:

- Elizabeth Margaret Rogers (ca.1847 – May 1933) married Dr. William James Verco (ca.1817 – 12 December 1891) on 21 December 1866
- Jane Rogers (ca.1849 – 20 September 1936) married Thomas Robert Bright S.M. (ca.1852 – 9 December 1924), son of H. E. Bright, on 26 May 1874.
- Marion Rogers (ca.1851 – 19 September 1926) married George Hingston Lake (10 December 1847 – 31 October 1900) on 19 November 1874
- William Sandergrove Rogers (19 May 1853 – 7 December 1905) married Helen Gordon (1860 – 4 December 1931) on 11 June 1885, lived at "View Bank", Finniss. She was daughter of Rev. James Gordon of Mount Barker
- Ann Wright "Annie" Rogers (20 February 1855 – 20 April 1951) married (later Sir) John Hannah Gordon (26 July 1850 – 23 December 1923) on 4 January 1877. He was son of Rev. James Gordon of Mount Barker.
- Edwin Rogers (17 September 1857 – 18 December 1908) married Julia Elizabeth Dunk ( – 23 November 1916) on 11 August 1881, lived at Portee, then Sandergrove and "Portee", Parkside.
