= Neville Blyth =

Australian politician

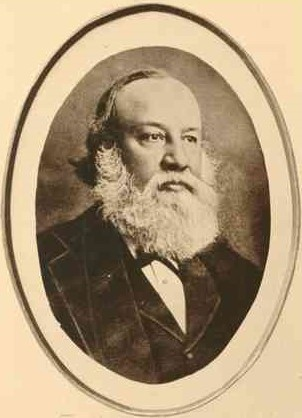

Neville Blyth (March 1825 – 15 February 1890) was a South Australian colonial politician.

Blyth was some two years younger than his brother Arthur Blyth, was also born in a suburb of Manchester, educated at King Edward's Grammar School under the Rev. Dr. Lee (later the first Bishop of Manchester), and with his family sailed to South Australia in 1839. Early in the forties Neville joined his brother Arthur at their father's ironmonger business, and the two were actively engaged in the trade up to 1865. At his father's death Neville Blyth was sole executor of his estate and, characteristically, first repaid debts his father had incurred in England but legally wiped out by his insolvency.

Blyth was elected a member of the South Australian House of Assembly for East Torrens at the general election in March 1860, as colleague of Henry Mildred, represented that district during three Parliaments (in 1865 with Charles Henry Goode as colleague) until July 1867, when he resigned rather than be forced to break a promise, and was succeeded by Daniel Fisher. In April, 1868, he was elected to the fifth Parliament as member of the Assembly for the Encounter Bay, with William Everard as his colleague. He was Treasurer of South Australia from 21 September to 13 October 1868 in the Hart cabinet and the crisis that preceded the formation of Strangways' Government. Having represented Encounter Bay until the end of the fifth Parliament he was chosen by the District of Victoria in August 1871 to succeed William Paltridge as the colleague of James Park Dawson Laurie. In 1871 he stood for the District of Encounter Bay, but was defeated and decided to quit politics, but in March, 1877, he was elected member for North Adelaide to fill the vacancy left by his brother, by then Sir Arthur Blyth, when he was appointed Agent General.

In the last Boucaut Ministry, which lasted from 26 October 1877 until 27 September 1878, Neville Blyth was Minister of Education, and had as his colleagues J. P. Boucaut, Sir William Morgan, Charles Mann, G. C. Hawker and T. Playford. Forced by ill-health to return to England, he resigned from politics in November 1878 and settled in Sutton in Surrey, living off the rents from his substantial South Australian properties. He died eleven years later.

Blyth was a communicant of the Church of England, but of liberal persuasion. He strongly opposed State aid to churches and fought for the rights of the working classes.

Blyth supported C. Emily Clark (sister of John Howard Clark) and Catherine Helen Spence in the formation of the "Boarding-out Society" for orphans.

== Family ==
On 14 April 1852 he married Julia Barns (or Barnes) of Everton or Manchester during a trip to England. She survived him; they had no children. He was survived also by three brothers — Sir Arthur, W. W. Blyth, of Gover Street, North Adelaide, who was more than five years his senior, and Howard Blyth of Edinburgh, Scotland.
