= Thomas Reynolds (Australian politician) =

Australian politician

The Right Honourable Thomas Reynolds
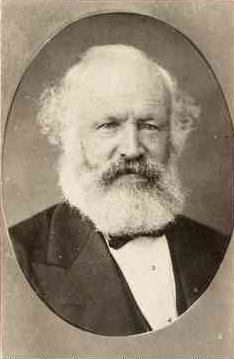

Premier of South Australia
- In office 9 May 1860 – 8 October 1861
- Monarch: Victoria
- Governor: Sir Richard MacDonnell
- Preceded by: Sir Richard Hanson
- Succeeded by: George Waterhouse

Treasurer of South Australia
- In office 13 October 1868 – 3 November 1868
- Premier: Sir Henry Ayers
- Preceded by: Neville Blyth
- Succeeded by: Henry Kent Hughes
- In office 3 May 1867 – 24 September 1868
- Premier: Sir Henry Ayers
- Preceded by: Walter Duffield
- Succeeded by: Neville Blyth
- In office 22 March 1865 – 20 September 1865
- Premier: Francis Dutton
- Preceded by: John Hart
- Succeeded by: Sir Arthur Blyth
- In office 17 October 1861 – 19 February 1862
- Premier: George Waterhouse
- Preceded by: Sir Arthur Blyth
- Succeeded by: Sir Arthur Blyth
- In office 9 May 1860 – 8 October 1861
- Premier: himself
- Preceded by: B. T. Finniss
- Succeeded by: Sir Arthur Blyth

Commissioner of Public Works
- In office 30 September 1857 – 12 June 1858
- Premier: Richard Hanson
- Preceded by: Samuel Davenport
- Succeeded by: Arthur Blyth

Member of the Parliament of South Australia
- In office 14 December 1871 – 28 August 1873
- Preceded by: Arthur Lindsay
- Succeeded by: Arthur Lindsay
- Constituency: Encounter Bay
- In office 5 November 1864 – 27 March 1870
- Preceded by: William Bakewell
- Succeeded by: David Murray
- Constituency: East Adelaide
- In office 2 May 1862 – 9 November 1862
- Preceded by: J.M. Solomon
- Succeeded by: seat abolished
- Constituency: City Of Adelaide
- In office 2 July 1854 – 17 February 1862
- Constituency: Legislative Council (1854–1857); Sturt (1857–1860); City Of Adelaide (1860–1862)

Personal details
- Born: 27 January 1818 London, England
- Died: 25 February 1875 (aged 57) Great Barrier Reef, Queensland
- Spouse: Anne Litchfield

Thomas Reynolds (27 January 1818 – 25 February 1875) was the fifth Premier of South Australia, serving from 9 May 1860 to 8 October 1861. He served five non-continuous terms as Treasurer.

The brother had died by the time Thomas Reynolds arrived.

Reynolds became an alderman in the Adelaide City Council in 1854, succeeding William Paxton, but soon resigned to enter the unicameral South Australian Legislative Council. In 1857 he was elected for Sturt in the first South Australian House of Assembly, a seat he held until 12 March 1860. From September 1857 to June 1858 he was commissioner of public works in the Hanson ministry. On 13 March 1860, Reynolds changed seats to City of Adelaide and on 9 May 1860 he became Premier and Treasurer of South Australia.

Reynolds resigned as premier and treasurer on 8 October 1861. Reynolds represented East Adelaide from 5 November 1864 to 27 March 1870 and Encounter Bay from 14 December 1871 to 2 February 1872 and 29 February 1872 to 28 August 1873.

Some years earlier his interest in the Northern Territory had been stimulated by reports from his nephew, Frederick Henry Litchfield. .

The SS Gothenburg which was wrecked in a tropical cyclone near the Great Barrier Reef on 24 February 1875, and he was drowned. He was married to Anne Litchfield, and had two sons. Anne died in the same shipwreck.

Long associated with the total abstinence (temperance) movement in Adelaide, Reynolds was known as "Teapot Tommy".

== Sources ==
- Gordon D. Combe, 'Reynolds, Thomas (1818–1875)', Australian Dictionary of Biography, Volume 6, Melbourne University Press, 1976, pp 23–24.
- Serle, Percival (1949). "Reynolds, Thomas". Dictionary of Australian Biography. Sydney: Angus & Robertson.
- Reynolds, Thomas: Australian Dictionary of Biography
- Reynolds, Thomas Australian Dictionary of Biography

Political offices
Preceded by Samuel Davenport	Commissioner of Public Works; 30 Sep 1857 – 12 Jun 1858	Succeeded by Arthur Blyth
Preceded by Richard Hanson	Premier of South Australia; 9 May 1860 – 8 Oct 1861	Succeeded by George Waterhouse
Preceded by Boyle Finniss	Treasurer of South Australia; 9 May 1860 – 8 Oct 1861	Succeeded by Arthur Blyth
Preceded by Arthur Blyth	Treasurer of South Australia; 17 Oct 1861 – 19 Feb 1862	Succeeded by Arthur Blyth
Preceded by John Hart	Treasurer of South Australia; 22 Mar – 20 Sep 1865	Succeeded by Arthur Blyth
Preceded by Walter Duffield	Treasurer of South Australia; 3 May 1867 – 24 Sep 1868	Succeeded by Neville Blyth
Preceded by Neville Blyth	Treasurer of South Australia; 13 Oct – 3 Nov 1868	Succeeded by Henry Hughes
Parliament of South Australia
New district	Member for Sturt; 1857–1860; Served alongside: John Hallett	Succeeded by Joseph Peacock
Preceded by Judah Solomon	Member for City of Adelaide; 1860–1862; Served alongside: Richard Hanson, Matthew Moorhouse, Philip Santo, Samuel Bakewell, William Parkin	District abolished
Preceded by William Bakewell	Member for East Adelaide; 1864–1870; Served alongside: Philip Santo, Robert Cottrell	Succeeded by David Murray
Preceded by Arthur Lindsay	Member for Encounter Bay; 1871–1873; Served alongside: William Everard, William Rogers	Succeeded by Arthur Lindsay
