= Arthur Blyth =

Australian politician

The Honourable Sir Arthur Blyth KCMG, CB
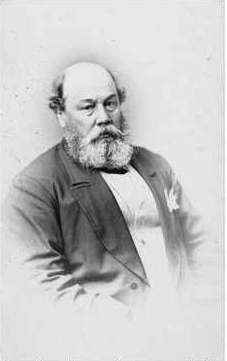

9th Premier of South Australia
- In office 4 August 1864 – 22 March 1865
- Monarch: Victoria
- Governor: Sir Dominick Daly
- Preceded by: Henry Ayers
- Succeeded by: Francis Dutton
- In office 10 November 1871 – 22 January 1872
- Monarch: Victoria
- Governor: Sir James Fergusson
- Preceded by: John Hart
- Succeeded by: Sir Henry Ayers
- In office 22 July 1873 – 3 June 1875
- Monarch: Victoria
- Governor: Sir Anthony Musgrave
- Preceded by: Sir Henry Ayers
- Succeeded by: James Boucaut

Personal details
- Born: 19 March 1823 Birmingham
- Died: 7 December 1891 (aged 68) Bournemouth
- Spouse: Jessie Ann Forrest (m. 1850–1891; his death)
- Occupation: Politician

Sir Arthur Blyth KCMG, CB (19 March 1823 – 7 December 1891) was Premier of South Australia three times; 1864–65, 1871–72 and 1873–75.

== Family ==
Arthur's younger brother, Neville Blyth, had a significant political career, being first elected to the House of Assembly for the seat of East Torrens in 1860.

Arthur Blyth married Jessie Ann Forrest (1827–21 December 1891), a daughter of Edward Forrest of Birmingham, on 5 March 1850; she died two weeks after her husband.

- Emily Grant Blyth (died 31 December 1926) married Robert Grant Murray R.N.R. on 23 August 1893
- (John) James Neville Blyth (20 November 1850 – ), married Elizabeth Emma Hawker (daughter of James Collins Hawker and granddaughter of Thomas Lipson) on 11 June 1873. In 1885 he was jailed for a year for passing valueless cheques. The couple divorced in 1908.
- Frances Eleanor Blyth (9 February 1855 – 31 October 1935) married Wiliam Briggs Sells on 16 January 1877.

== Recognition ==
The Hundred of Blyth (SA) in the Mid North of South Australia, and hence the later township of Blyth, was named for him in 1860 by Governor MacDonnell.

The Blyth River in the Northern Territory was named after him by Francis Cadell in 1867. The Hundred of Blyth (NT) was also named for him in 1871.

He was knighted KCMG in 1877 and appointed CB in 1886.

The Hundred of Jessie and possibly the ceased government town of Jessie were named for his wife.

== Notes ==
Political offices
Preceded by Samuel Davenport	Commissioner of Public Works; 21 Aug – 1 Sep 1857	Succeeded by Samuel Davenport
Preceded by Thomas Reynolds	Commissioner of Public Works; 12 Jun 1858 – 9 May 1860	Succeeded by Alexander Hay
Preceded by Thomas Reynolds	Treasurer of South Australia; 8 Oct – 17 Oct 1861	Succeeded by Thomas Reynolds
Preceded by Thomas Reynolds	Treasurer of South Australia; 19 Feb 1862 – 4 Jul 1863	Succeeded by Lavington Glyde
Preceded by Henry Ayers	Premier of South Australia; 4 Aug 1864 – 22 Mar 1865	Succeeded by Francis Dutton
Preceded by William Milne	Commissioner of Crown Lands and Immigration; 4 Aug 1864 – 22 Mar 1865	Succeeded by Henry Strangways
Preceded by Thomas Reynolds	Treasurer of South Australia; 20 Sep – 23 Oct 1865	Succeeded by Walter Duffield
Preceded by John Hart	Chief Secretary of South Australia; 28 Mar 1866 – 3 May 1867	Succeeded by Henry Ayers
Preceded by John Hart	Premier of South Australia; 10 Nov 1871 – 22 Jan 1872	Succeeded by Henry Ayers
Preceded by John Hart	Treasurer of South Australia; 10 Nov 1871 – 22 Jan 1872	Succeeded by Henry Hughes
Preceded by Wentworth Cavenagh	Commissioner of Crown Lands and Immigration; 10 Nov 1871	Succeeded by William Townsend
Preceded by Henry Ayers	Premier of South Australia; 22 Jul 1873 – 3 Jun 1875	Succeeded by James Boucaut
Preceded by Henry Ayers	Chief Secretary of South Australia; 22 Jul 1873 – 3 Jun 1875	Succeeded by William Morgan
Preceded by John Colton	Treasurer of South Australia; 26 Mar 1876	Succeeded by Robert Ross
Parliament of South Australia
Preceded by New district	Member for Gumeracha; 1857–1868; Served alongside: Alexander Hay, Alexander Murray	Succeeded by William Sandover
Preceded by William Sandover	Member for Gumeracha; 1870–1875; Served alongside: Ebenezer Ward	Succeeded by Frederick Hannaford
Preceded by New district	Member for North Adelaide; 1875–1877	Succeeded by Neville Blyth
Diplomatic posts
Preceded by Francis Dutton	Agent-General for South Australia; 1877–1891	Succeeded by John Bray
