= John Neales =

Australian politician

John Bentham Neales (13 June 1806 – 31 July 1873), frequently referred to as "J. Bentham Neales" or "Bentham Neales", was a businessman and politician in the early days of South Australia, by some regarded as the "Father of Mining in South Australia".

Neales was born in Plymouth, England, the son of Elizabeth née Bentham. Both parents died when he was very young, leaving him to be brought up by an uncle. He migrated to South Australia on the Eden, arriving on 24 June 1838.

== Career ==
Neales began business in Adelaide as a general merchant, then an auctioneer, taking over much of the business of Robert Cock. He was then appointed Government auctioneer; the first four years under the alias "Neales Bentham" to avoid confusion with W. H. Neale, another auctioneer in the city. forming the Adelaide Auction Company in 1840. He bought land at Port Lincoln, where he founded its first newspaper, the Port Lincoln Herald in 1839.

In 1841, Neales helped found the South Australian Mining Association which worked the "Wheal Gawler" silver-lead deposit at Glen Osmond then Montacute. The company later opened the copper mine at Burra, which made him a considerable fortune.

He took over John Richardson's auction business on the north corner of King William and Hindley streets, where in 1846 he opened "Neale's Exchange Rooms" at the front of his Auction Mart, which served as South Australia's first major stock exchange.

Around 1860, he was involved in a Parliamentary enquiry into the floating of the Great Northern Copper Mining Company of James Chambers.

== Public life ==
Neales was one of Adelaide's original Board of City Commissioners, then a city councillor, when he actively supported the provision of roads, railway to the Port in 1849 water, drainage and gas supply.

Neales was appointed to the South Australian Legislative Council in 1851 and was elected to the seat of North Adelaide in 1855. He was appointed one of the drafters of the State Constitution in 1852.

Neales served as a member of the South Australian House of Assembly for the City of Adelaide in 1857-60 and for the seat of The Burra (partnered with George Cole) from 1862 to 1870. Neales succeeded Francis Dutton as Minister for Crown Lands in 1865, and held that position for a year. A month after losing that seat, he was elected unopposed to the Legislative Council in 1870, a position he held until his death.

== Recognition ==
On 6 June 1859, John McDouall Stuart named Neales River for him.

The Hundred of Neales was also named for him.

A remarkable tribute was paid him in the pages of The Register by John Howard Clark in the voice of "Geoffry Crabthorn", better known for pungent satire than fulsome praise:

In Memoriam. John Bentham Neales, Died 31 July 1873.
Another veteran from the thinning ranks,
A name familiar for long rolling years,
To-day is added to the list of blanks
That break the roll-call of our pioneers.
The feet that firmly in the time gone by
Trudged bravely onward o'er the rocky road,
Life's journey past, now still and idle lie,
The tomb their resting-place and last abode.
The arms so stalwart— in the early days
That toiled untiring in their manhood's pride,
And aided our new Southern home to raise —
Rest from their labours by their master's side.
We miss the smile that cheered us on our way,
The kindly voice so full of honest fun;
And thinking o'er the words we've heard him say,
His jokes are all remembered one by one.
When in the Mart amidst the busy throng,
Some quaint remark broke slowly on the ear;
The rippled laughter that rolled swift along,
Yet made his presence in our midst more dear.
Father of all our mining, fitly named !
What hidden veins of wealth throughout the land,
What copper lodes for richness justly famed
Owe their first opening to his helping hand.
What lofty flumes which e'en the clouds have cleft,
What hordes of workers in the bowels of earth,
What thriving townships rising right and left,
To enterprise like his ascribe their birth.
True colonist, 'tis such as thee we need,
True colonist, 'tis such as thee we miss,
Who hoard not riches up in selfish greed,
But spend them in such enterprise as this.
And worthy was it that so clear a mind,
That planned so much to make his country great,
Its proper station in the land should find
Midst those who ill or wisely rule the State.
But honours fade, and titles are but names,
And history at best is fickle yet,
John Bentham Neales some dearer mem'ry claims,
The tribute of affection and regret.

== Family ==
Neales married Margaret Williams (c. 1808 – 18 October 1877) on 11 July 1843. They had two sons and three daughters:

- Elizabeth Bentham Neales (c. 1843 – 28 May 1933) married Rev. (later Canon) Thomas Field on 5 November 1867
- William Bentham Neales (3 May 1844 – 28 February 1914) married Emma Palmer on 21 April 1883. He was, with T. Barnfield, R. C. Cornish and others, a founder of the Baker's Creek Company, that removed tons of gold from their mine near Hillgrove, New South Wales. He was also a founder of Adelaide Crystal Ice Company
- John Bentham Neales (18 June 1845 – 18 October 1906)
- Caroline Bentham Neales (23 February 1848 – ) married John Lyon Field on 3 June 1873
- Margaret Bentham Neales ( – 6 December 1925) married Robert Maxwell Bunbury on 16 December 1880

== Sources ==
https://adb.anu.edu.au/biography/neales-john-bentham-2503
