= Joseph Peacock (politician) =

Joseph Peacock (c. 1825 – 25 July 1867) lived at Glenelg and was M.P. for Sturt from 1860 until his death. He worked as co-manager of Peacock and Son in Grenfell Street, was a trustee of the South Australian Mining Company and a director of the National Bank.

He married Harriet Hope Gooch (c. 1832 – 27 August 1854) around 1850. They had two daughters who never survived childhood. He married again, to Maria Houghton (c. 1828 – 18 June 1901). A daughter, Kate Marian Lilian Peacock, married Dr. Harry Swift. Maria Peacock died at her residence "Newland House", 80 Brougham Place, North Adelaide. "Newland House" was later purchased by Caleb Peacock, and is now owned by the South Australian branch of the Australian Medical Association.
