= Electoral district of Encounter Bay =

Colonial electoral district of South Australia

Coordinates: 35°30′S 138°44′E

Encounter Bay South Australia—House of Assembly
- State: South Australia
- Created: 1857
- Abolished: 1902
- Namesake: Encounter Bay
- Demographic: Rural

Encounter Bay was an electoral district of the House of Assembly in the Australian colony (state of Australia from 1901) of South Australia from 1857 to 1902.

At its creation in 1857, it included booths at Goolwa, Port Elliot, Rapid Bay and Yankalilla. It expanded over time with the settlement of the area to include booths at Cape Jervis, Inman Valley and Myponga (1870), Hog Bay and Port Victor (now Victor Harbor) (1875), Kingscote (1878), Bullaparinga (1881), Second Valley (1893, replacing Rapid Bay), Nangkita (1896) and Torrens Vale (1899).

In 2015, the former electorate of Encounter Bay is now divided between the state electorates of Finniss and Hammond.

== Members ==
Member	Party	Term	Member	Party	Term
Arthur Lindsay		1857–1860	Benjamin Babbage		1857–1857
Arthur Lindsay		1857–1860	Henry Strangways		1858–1862
John Lindsay		1860–1865	Henry Strangways		1858–1862
John Lindsay		1860–1865	David Sutherland		1862–1868
William Everard		1865–1870	David Sutherland		1862–1868
William Everard		1865–1870	Neville Blyth		1868–1870
Arthur Lindsay		1870–1871	Emil Wentzel		1870–1871
Thomas Reynolds		1871–1873	William Everard		1871–1872
Thomas Reynolds		1871–1873	William Rogers		1872–1875
Arthur Lindsay		1873–1878	William Rogers		1872–1875
Arthur Lindsay		1873–1878	James Boucaut		1875–1878
John Parsons		1878–1881	James Boucaut		1875–1878
John Parsons		1878–1881	William West-Erskine		1878–1881
Henry Downer		1881–1891	Simpson Newland		1881–1887
Henry Downer		1881–1891	Charles Hussey		1887–1890
Henry Downer		1881–1891	John Kelly		1890–1896
Henry Downer	Defence League	1891–1896	John Kelly		1890–1896
King O'Malley		1896–1899	William Carpenter	Labor	1896–1902
Charles Tucker		1899–1902	William Carpenter	Labor	1896–1902

After Encounter Bay was abolished, Tucker went on to represent the new district of Alexandra from 3 May 1902.

== See also ==
- Encounter (disambiguation)
