= James Boucaut =

Australian politician and judge

The Honourable Sir James Boucaut KCMG KC
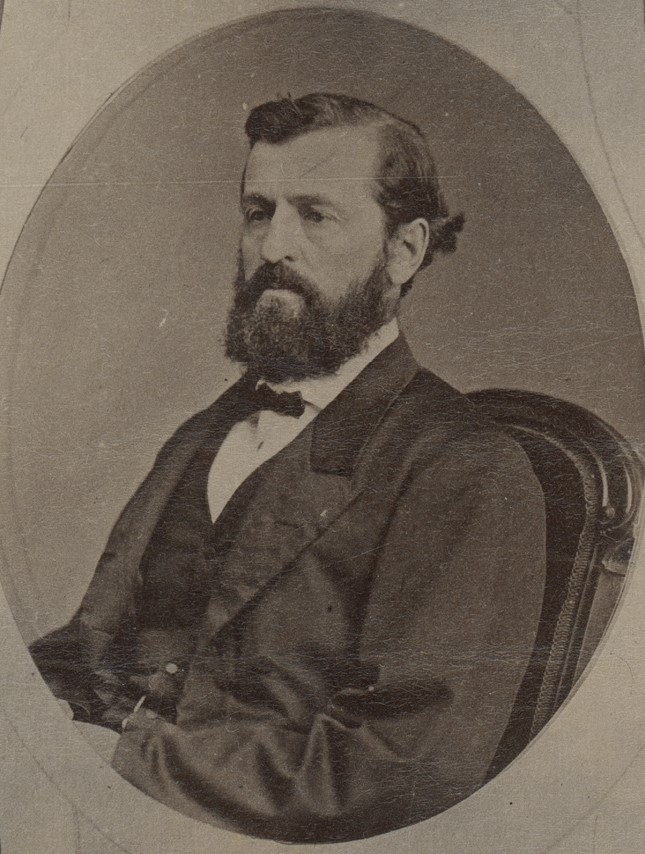
- James Boucaut c. 1872

11th Premier of South Australia
- In office 28 March 1866 – 3 May 1867
- Monarch: Victoria
- Governor: Dominick Daly
- Preceded by: John Hart
- Succeeded by: Henry Ayers
- In office 3 June 1875 – 6 June 1876
- Monarch: Victoria
- Governor: Anthony Musgrave
- Preceded by: Arthur Blyth
- Succeeded by: John Colton
- In office 26 October 1877 – 27 September 1878
- Monarch: Victoria
- Governor: William Jervois
- Preceded by: John Colton
- Succeeded by: William Morgan

Personal details
- Born: 29 October 1831 Mylor, Cornwall, England, United Kingdom
- Died: 1 February 1916 (aged 84) Glenelg, South Australia, Australia

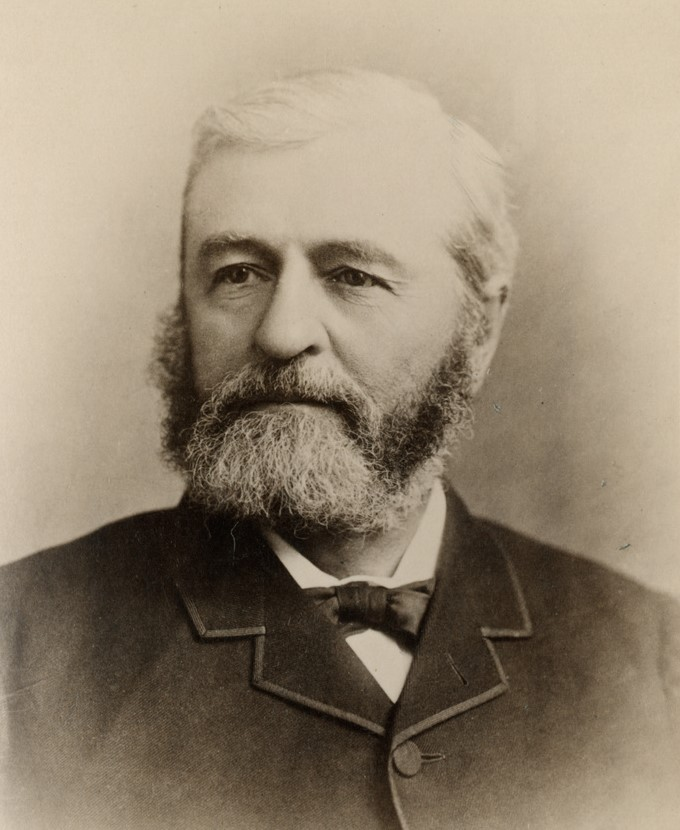
James Boucaut c. 1895

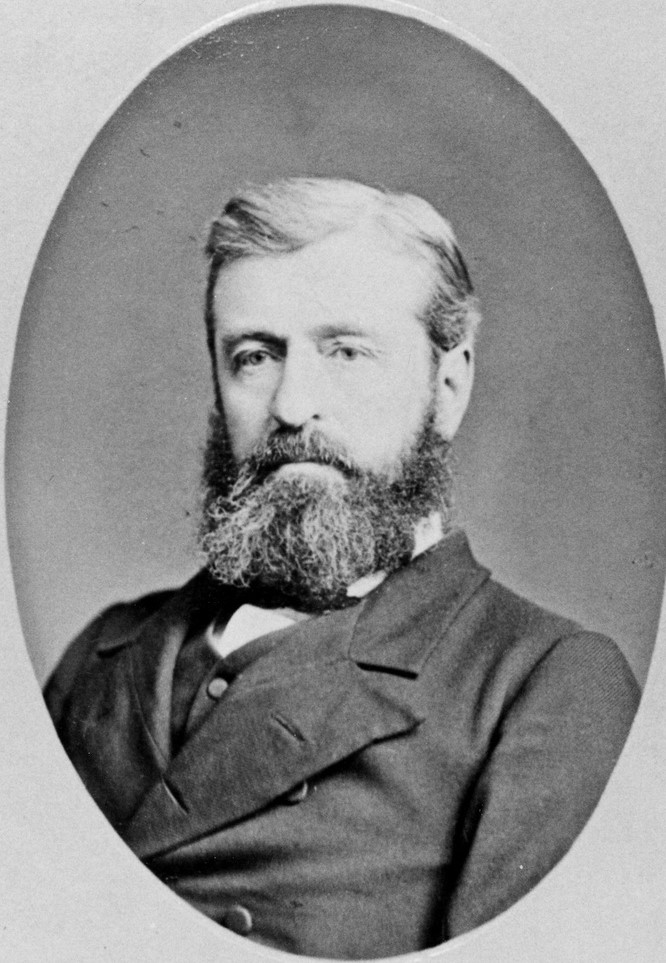
James Boucaut c. 1880

Sir James Penn Boucaut KCMG (/ˈboʊkɔːt/;) (29 October 1831 – 1 February 1916) was a South Australian politician and Australian judge. He was a member of the South Australian House of Assembly on four occasions: from 1861 to 1862 for City of Adelaide, from 1865 to 1870 for West Adelaide (1865–1868) and The Burra (1868–1870), from 1871 to 1878 for West Torrens (1871–1875) and Encounter Bay (1875–1878), and a final stint in Encounter Bay in 1878.

At 34 years and 150 days of age, Boucaut was the youngest person to have been appointed Premier of South Australia. He was Premier three times: from 1866 to 1867, from 1875 to 1876, and from 1877 to 1878. He was Attorney-General of South Australia under Premiers John Hart and Henry Ayers, and served variously as Attorney-General, Treasurer, Commissioner of Public Works and Commissioner of Crown Lands and Immigration in his own ministries. He left politics in 1878 when he was appointed a judge of the Supreme Court of South Australia, serving until his retirement in 1905.

== Early life ==
Boucaut was born in Mylor, Cornwall, the eldest son of Captain Ray Boucaut, former commander of the East India Company's ship Mary Ann.

== Career in Australia ==
Boucaut was narrowly defeated in the 1868 election for East Adelaide, but returned unopposed for The Burra.He badly lost the 1869 election for The Burra but entered the house again as member for West Torrens in the by-election of 1871.

Boucaut remained very attached to his roots in Cornwall, being active in the Adelaide Cornish Association, and he considered Cornwall to be a nation.

His brother Bastin Boucaut (c. 1843 – 16 September 1864) was a member of B. T. Finniss's 1864 surveying party to the Northern Territory; he died of fever at Escape Cliffs, aged 21.

== Late life and legacy ==
Boucaut resigned in February 1905 and died at his home in Glenelg on 1 February 1916, aged 84. He was interred in the Boucault family vault at St Mary's on the Sturt.

Political offices
Preceded by Richard Andrews	Attorney-General of South Australia; 23 Oct 1865 – 3 May 1867	Succeeded by Richard Andrews
Preceded by John Hart	Premier of South Australia; 28 Mar 1866 – 3 May 1867	Succeeded by Henry Ayers
Preceded by Charles Mann	Attorney-General of South Australia; 22 Jan 1872 – 4 Mar 1872	Succeeded by George Stevenson
Preceded by Arthur Blyth	Premier of South Australia; 3 Jun 1875 – 6 Jun 1876	Succeeded by John Colton
Preceded by William West-Erskine	Commissioner of Public Works; 2 Feb 1876 – 6 Jun 1876	Succeeded by John Colton
Preceded by John Colton	Premier of South Australia; 26 Oct 1877 – 27 Sep 1878	Succeeded by William Morgan
