= John Hart (South Australian colonist) =

Australian politician

The Honourable Captain John Hart CMG
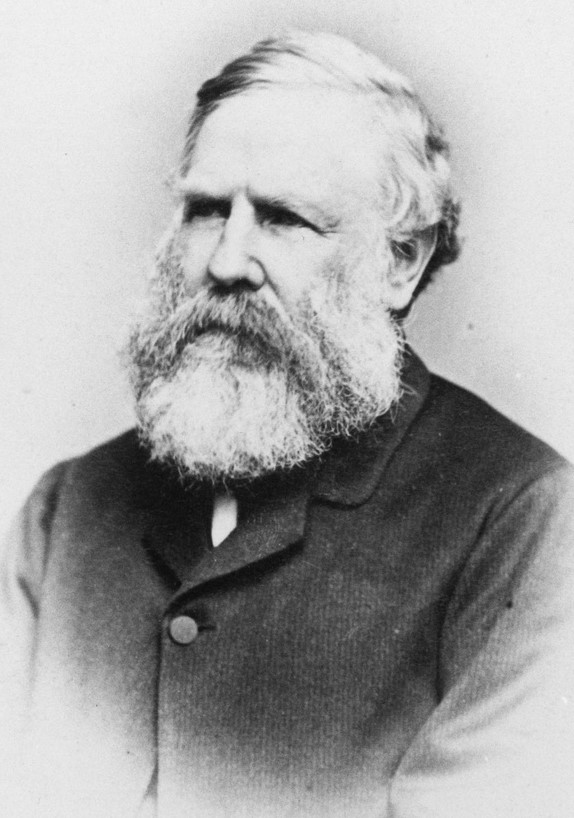

10th Premier of South Australia
- In office 30 May 1870 – 10 November 1871
- Monarch: Victoria
- Governor: Sir James Fergusson
- Preceded by: Henry Strangways
- Succeeded by: Arthur Blyth
- In office 24 September 1868 – 13 October 1868
- Monarch: Victoria
- Governor: Sir James Fergusson
- Preceded by: Henry Ayers
- Succeeded by: Henry Ayers
- In office 23 October 1865 – 28 March 1866
- Monarch: Victoria
- Governor: Dominick Daly
- Preceded by: Henry Ayers
- Succeeded by: James Boucaut

Treasurer of South Australia
- In office 30 May 1870 – 10 November 1871
- Premier: himself
- Preceded by: Edward Hamilton
- Succeeded by: Sir Arthur Blyth
- In office 15 July 1863 – 22 March 1865
- Premier: Sir Henry Ayers; Sir Arthur Blyth
- Preceded by: Lavington Glyde
- Succeeded by: Thomas Reynolds
- In office 30 September 1857 – 12 June 1858
- Premier: Sir Richard Hanson
- Preceded by: J.B. Hughes
- Succeeded by: B. T. Finniss
- In office 21 August 1857 – 1 September 1857
- Premier: John Baker
- Preceded by: Sir Robert Torrens
- Succeeded by: J.B. Hughes

Member of the House of Assembly of South Australia
- In office 4 May 1868 – 28 January 1873
- Preceded by: Sir James Boucaut
- Succeeded by: Rowland Rees
- Constituency: The Burra
- In office 8 May 1862 – 28 March 1866
- Preceded by: P.B. Coglin
- Succeeded by: Edward Hamilton
- Constituency: Light
- In office 9 March 1857 – 23 August 1859
- Preceded by: seat established
- Succeeded by: William Owen
- Constituency: Port Adelaide

Member of the Legislative Council of South Australia for Victoria
- In office 7 July 1854 – 2 February 1857
- In office 12 July 1851 – 7 July 1853

Personal details
- Born: 25 February 1809 London, England, United Kingdom
- Died: 28 January 1873 (aged 63) Adelaide, South Australia, Australia

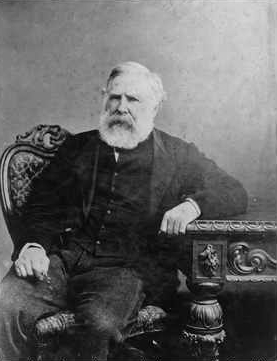

Captain John Hart CMG (25 February 1809 – 28 January 1873) was a South Australian politician and a Premier of South Australia.

== Early life ==
Hart was born in England, son of journalist/newspaper publisher John Harriott Hart and Mary Hart née Glanville. probably at 23 Warwick Lane off Newgate Street, London, and baptised at Christ Church Greyfriars, London. At 12 years of age he first went to sea, visiting Hobart, Van Diemen's Land (now Tasmania, Australia) in September 1828 in the Magnet. In 1832 Hart was in command of the schooner Elizabeth, a sealer operating from Tasmania and visiting Kangaroo Island and Gulf St Vincent. Early January 1838 he was "on the River Murray near Mount Hope" (perhaps the Lachlan near Hillston) and foresaw the great thoroughfare it would become in the second half of that century. Hack also gave Hart two acres (0.8 ha) of land in Adelaide. In 1839 he managed a whaling station at Encounter Bay.

In January 1843 Hart sailed to England in command of the South Australian Company's ageing barque Sarah and Elizabeth, delivering it to London for sale. Aboard as a passenger was the explorer John Hill, from whom Hart had just purchased Section 2112 at Port Adelaide, in partnership with Jacob Hagen. In December 1843 Hart returned to Adelaide in command of the barque Augustus of which he was part owner with Jacob Hagen and Hagen's brother. Among the passengers was the artist George French Angas.

He settled near Port Adelaide, where he joined with H. Kent Hughes as merchants Hughes and Hart then, as Hart & Company, established large and successful flour mills. His flour mill at the Port was regarded as one of the best, and "Hart's Flour" commanded the highest prices in Australia. John Hart & Co. merged with the Adelaide Milling Company in 1882.

He was a member of the Agricultural and Horticultural Society and its president from 1858 to 1859.

== Political career ==
In 1851, he was elected to the Legislative Council. Hart resigned in 1853 to visit England and was re-elected the next year, serving until the Council expired in 1857.

Hart was member for Light from May 1868 to April 1870. including a second short stint as premier from 24 September 1868 to 13 October 1868.

At the 1870 election, Hart changed seats to represent The Burra, the seat he retained until his death. He was premier and Treasurer again from 30 May 1870 to 10 November 1871.

One newspaper obituary gave the opinion that Hart had been unfairly criticised in several of his decisions (and had been subsequently vindicated) and should have been given credit for the Overland Telegraph Line rather than Sir Henry Ayers.

== Death ==
John Hart died suddenly on 28 January 1873, while chairing the third annual general meeting of the Mercantile Marine Insurance Company at the Adelaide Town Hall, leaving a widow and a large family.

== Recognition ==
Hart was created C.M.G. in 1870.

== Family ==
John Hart married Margaret Gillmor Todd ( Abt. 1815 – 1876) fourth daughter of Charles Hawkes Todd and Elizabeth Bentley (and sister of James Henthorn Todd, Robert Bentley Todd, William Gowan Todd, and Armstrong Todd) on 12 May 1845; among their two sons and five daughters were:

- Elizabeth Sarah Hart (9 March 1846 – 3 June 1908) married Henry Brook Dobbin (ca.1840 – 22 July 1873) on 3 July 1867
- Margaret Hart (14 May 1847 – 2 August 1920) married Arthur Powell; she founded St. Margaret's Home for convalescents, Semaphore.
- John Hart, Jr. (16 July 1848 – 15 August 1881) married Emily Lavinia Finch (1849 – 5 October 1939) on 8 August 1877; he was MHA for Port Adelaide 1880–1881. He died at Wooton Lea, Glen Osmond
- Mary Hart (9 September 1849 – 16 April 1915) married Henry Huth Walters (March 1841 – ) on 14 October 1868
- Charles Hawkes Todd Hart (19 November 1850 – ) was manager Port Adelaide flour mill 1873, was owner of "Beefacres", near Campbelltown with brother John Hart Jr.; may have returned to England.
- Annie Hart (12 August 1852 – 1 December 1913) married Rowland James Egerton-Warburton (4 February 1846 – 1918) on 14 May 1872. Rowland was a son of Colonel Peter Egerton-Warburton.
- Katherine Hart (ca.1856 – 21 April 1904) married Algernon Arbuthnott Godwin on 9 January 1879
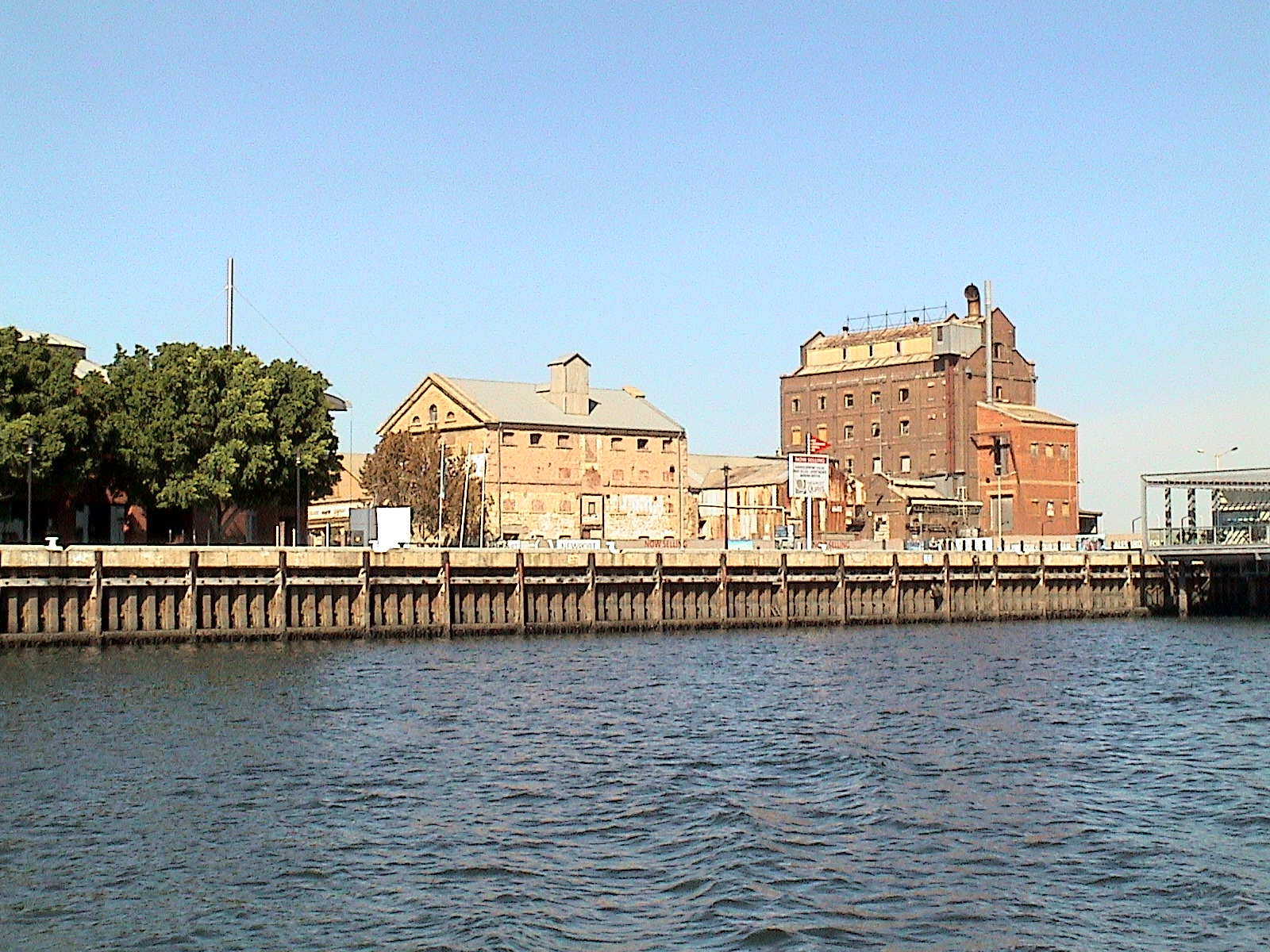
Hart's Mill (1855, centre) and the Adelaide Milling Company flour mill (c.1890, right) are prominent landmarks adjacent to the southern wharf of the Inner Harbour at Port Adelaide.
34°50′33.2″S 138°29′58.4″E

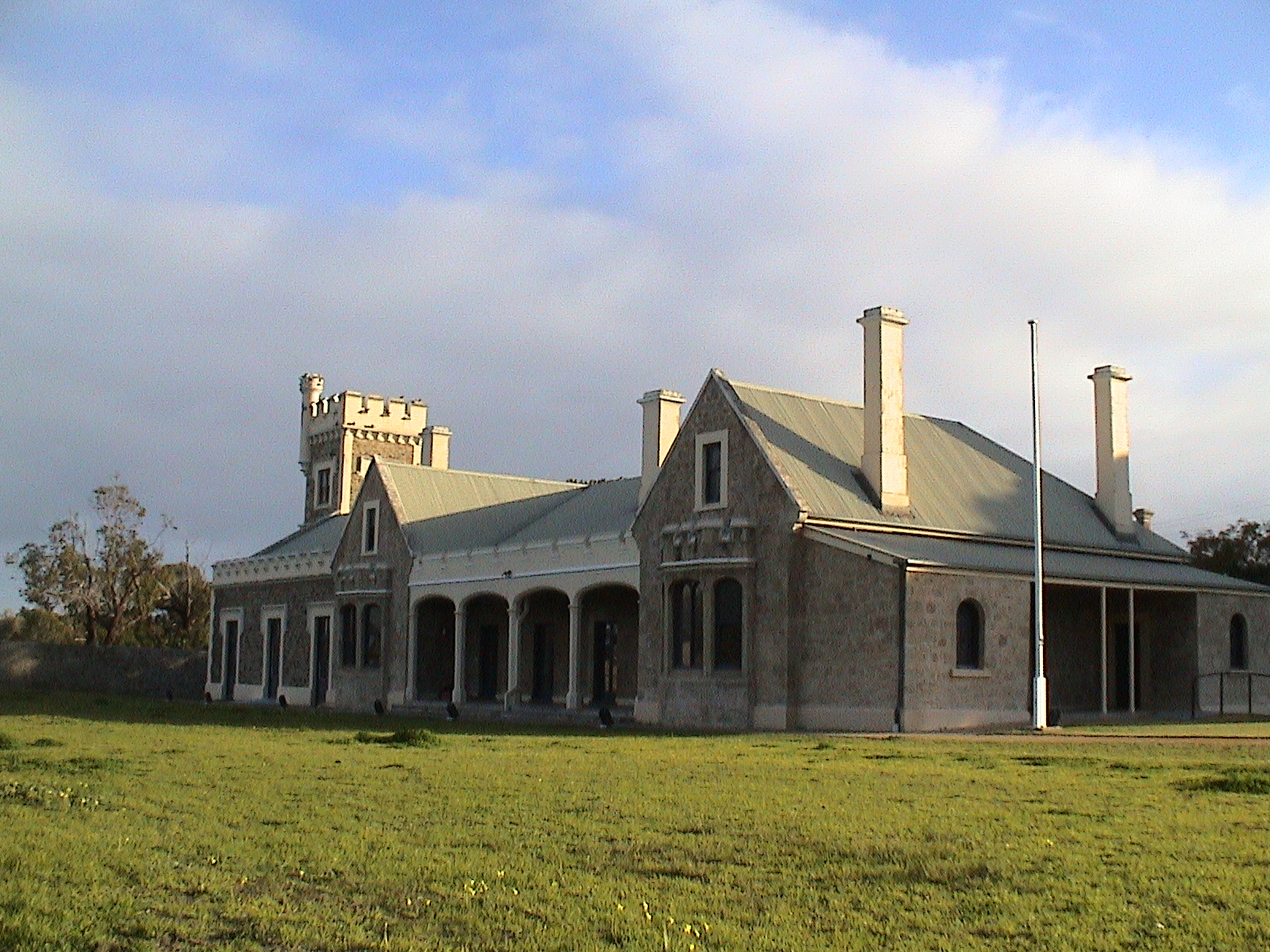
Glanville Hall, the family home built in 1856 by Captain Hart at Semaphore South, is now owned by the City of Port Adelaide-Enfield, and used as a function centre.
34°50′55.0″S 138°28′53.8″E

== See also ==
Other South Australian flour millers of the period were:

- Dr. Benjamin Archer Kent, for whom Kent Town, the site of his mill, was named.
- John Darling and Son
- John Dunn
- James Magarey and his son William James Magarey
- William Randell
- John Ridley

== Sources ==
- Sally O'Neill, 'Hart, John (1809–1873)', Australian Dictionary of Biography, Volume 4, Melbourne University Press, 1972, pp 355–356. Retrieved 22 January 2009
- Serle, Percival (1949). "Hart, John". Dictionary of Australian Biography. Sydney: Angus & Robertson.
- Harris, Charles Alexander (1901). "Hart, John (1809-1873)" . In Lee, Sidney (ed.). Dictionary of National Biography (1st supplement). London: Smith, Elder & Co.

Parliament of South Australia
Preceded by Thomas O'Halloran; Charles Sturt; Henry Young	Member of the South Australian Legislative Council; 1851–1857; Served alongside: Multiple Members	Succeeded by Henry Ayers; Charles Davies; Charles Everard; Thomas O'Halloran; Abraham Scott
New district	Member of Parliament for Port Adelaide; 1857–1859; Served alongside: John Hughes, Edward Collinson	Succeeded by William Owen
Preceded by William Owen	Member of Parliament for Port Adelaide; 1862–1866; Served alongside: Patrick Coglin, David Bower	Succeeded by Jacob Smith
Preceded by Patrick Coglin	Member of Parliament for Light; 1868–1870; Served alongside: William Lewis	Succeeded by Edward Hamilton
Preceded by James Boucaut	Member of Parliament for The Burra; 1870–1873; Served alongside: Charles Mann	Succeeded by Rowland Rees
Political offices
Preceded by Robert Torrens	Treasurer of South Australia; 1857	Succeeded by John Hughes
Preceded by John Hughes	Treasurer of South Australia; 1857–1858	Succeeded by Boyle Finniss
Preceded by George Waterhouse	Chief Secretary of South Australia; 1863	Succeeded by Henry Ayers
Preceded by Lavington Glyde	Treasurer of South Australia; 1863–1865	Succeeded by Arthur Blyth
Preceded by Henry Ayers	Premier of South Australia; 1865–1866	Succeeded by James Boucaut
Preceded by Henry Ayers	Chief Secretary of South Australia; 1865–1866	Succeeded by Arthur Blyth
Preceded by Henry Ayers	Premier of South Australia; 1868	Succeeded by Henry Ayers
Preceded by Henry Ayers	Chief Secretary of South Australia; 1868	Succeeded by Henry Ayers
Preceded by Henry Strangways	Premier of South Australia; 1870–1871	Succeeded by Arthur Blyth
Preceded by Edward Hamilton	Treasurer of South Australia; 1870–1871	Succeeded by Arthur Blyth
