= David Sutherland (politician) =

Australian politician

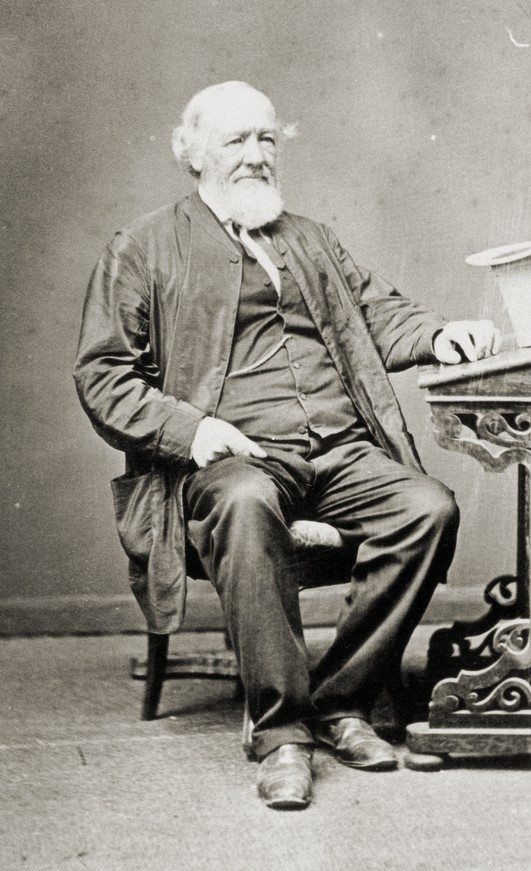

David Sutherland (c. 1803 – 30 Aug 1879) was a South Australian merchant, farmer and politician. He was a member of the South Australian House of Assembly from 1860 to 1868, representing the electorates of Noarlunga (1860-1862) and Encounter Bay (1862-1868). He was the uncle of future federal Senator Sir Josiah Symon.

== History ==
Sutherland was born in Wick, Caithness, a member of an old and prestigious family, and son of a prosperous merchant and shipowner. He inherited his father's business and for a time ran it with his two younger brothers, extending operations to Limerick, and traded throughout Great Britain and Europe. Around 1830 he married Caroline, daughter of James de Zouche, chief executive officer of the Bank of Ireland in Dublin. They had six children, two of whom died young. He joined the firm of Forbes, McNeill, & Co., of London, and was appointed to act as their agent in Australia, choosing to make South Australia his home, on account of the freedom of religion practised in that State.

He emigrated to South Australia on the William Nichol, captained by William Elder (1813–1882, brother of Alexander Lang Elder), with his family, servants, household goods, and a large quantity of merchandise. They arrived at Holdfast Bay on 7 July 1840, and for a time lived in a "portable cottage" before renting the fine house on Hurtle Square, Adelaide, owned by George Milner Stephen and previously occupied by E. C. Frome. This was in the time of Governor Gawler's lavish expenditure on public buildings and other infrastructure, and the city was for a time quite prosperous and Sutherland's merchandise sold at a good profit, mostly on credit, much of which he could never recover.

He was appointed in 1840 to the Hospital Board and in 1842, with Henry Watson and Captain Butler, to the Immigration Board, which was responsible for granting of relief to distressed immigrants, of which there was a multitude in the years of financial stringency imposed by Governor Grey following Gawler's recall.

Forbes, McNeill & Co. collapsed, from causes that had nothing to do with South Australia or Sutherland, leaving his business in shambles, and he had to arrange matters in the colony as best he could. Fortunately for him, he had before coming to South Australia purchased five 80 acres (32 ha) sections of land, four of them contiguous between Brighton and Sturt, and one at Encounter Bay. On the 320 acres on the Brighton plains he built a substantial house, and otherwise developed as a farm, which he named "Dunrobin", and he was forced to learn farming in the unfamiliar climate. According to a different newspaper article, the Dunrobin Estate consisted of two sections purchased in 1843. Eventually the farm began to pay, and though money was very scarce, living became very cheap and he prospered during the Victorian gold rush, selling the diggers flour and pressed hay.

In 1854 a great financial crisis overtook Victoria, and his debtors either became insolvent or vanished. The farm, whose soil was becoming exhausted for wheat growing, had a succession of bad seasons with low prices and, though he lived frugally, his financial situation continued to deteriorate. In 1856 his eldest son died of heart disease.

He was a member of the Central Road Board for eight years, a member of the Brighton District Council, President of the District Chairmen's Association, and a member of the Central Agricultural Society. He was elected to the South Australian House of Assembly for Noarlunga and served from March 1860 to November 1862 and for Encounter Bay November 1862 to April 1868. In politics he was a Liberal and Freetrader, opposed to State aid to religion in any form. He favoured a comprehensive system of State education, and worked to do away with nominated members in the Legislative Council, and considered that too much public money was being spent on unproductive works in the city, and more should be devoted to the development of the country by opening up by means of communication, leading to his being jocularly referred to as the "Colossus of Roads". Distressed at the way the Land Fund was being squandered on supporting a bureaucracy bloated by nepotism and personal favours, introduced the Land Fund Appropriation Bill, colloquially "Sutherland's Act", which, with the assistance of Sir Richard Hanson, was passed by both Houses. The effect of the Bill was to devote all funds arising from the sale or lease of public funds firstly to pay the interest on existing public debt; and second, to expend three quarters of the balance on productive public works and the rest on immigration. While it continued in operation the land fund constantly accumulated, but was resented by Ministers, for whom frugality was anathema and retrenchment was unpalatable. Eventually Sutherland's Act was repealed, rather than continue the farce of placing money in a Savings Bank, then borrowing an equal amount from the same bank for daily expenditure.

Denied Government support, nevertheless Sutherland continued to spend time and energy on his unpaid public duties. Eventually he was forced, in a weak market, to sell his Dunrobin estate and all his personal property and live at his son's farm near Mount Gambier. His wife died, then the farm was destroyed by bushfire. He resided im Mount Gambier, then Narracoorte, alternated between his two daughters. He died at Magill on 30 August 1879, of the debilities of old age.

== Family ==
David Sutherland (9 November 1801 – 30 August 1879) married Caroline La Zouche ( – 20 June 1872). Their children included:

- Josiah Sutherland (1830 – 29 July 1856)
- Caroline Sutherland (c. July 1834 – 11 June 1928) never married, lived at Glen Street, Burnside.
- James De La Zouche Sutherland (1836 – 9 January 1904), barrister and solicitor of Mount Gambier, sat on the Supreme Court of South Australia. He was a champion rifle shot, declared insolvent 1874.
- Ellen Sutherland (c. 1839 – 11 December 1917) married Malcolm Henry Leworthy ( – ) on 4 April 1876

His sister Elizabeth Sutherland (1815–1901) of Wick married James Symon (1808–1878) of Perth. Sir Josiah Symon was a son.
