= 4th Parliament of South Australia =

1865–1868 meeting of the South Australian Parliament

Fourth Parliament of South Australia
←	3rd	5th	→
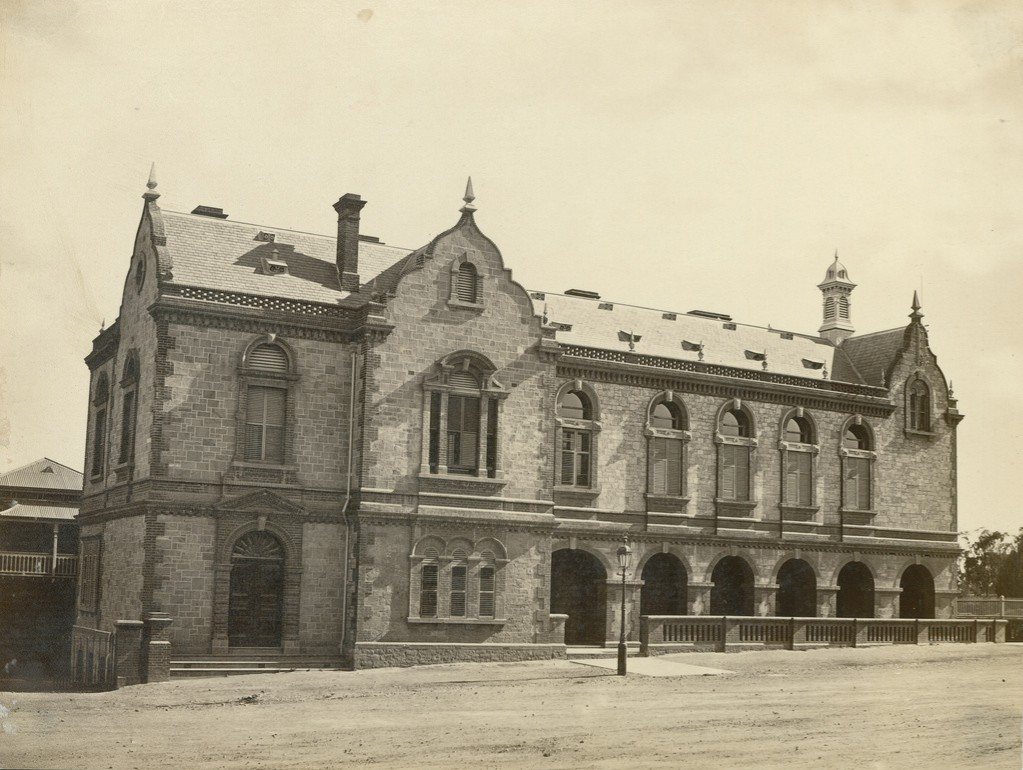
- Old Parliament House (1872)

Overview
- Legislative body: Parliament of South Australia
- Meeting place: Old Parliament House
- Term: 31 March 1865 – 26 March 1868
- Election: 1–13 March 1865

Legislative Council
- Members: 18
- President: John Morphett

House of Assembly
- Members: 36
- Speaker: George Strickland Kingston

Sessions
- 1st: 31 March 1865 – 4 August 1865
- 2nd: 29 September 1865 – 16 March 1866
- 3rd: 15 June 1866 – 11 January 1867
- 4th: 5 July 1867 – 19 December 1867

The 4th Parliament of South Australia was a meeting of the legislative branch of the South Australian state government, composed of the South Australian Legislative Council and the South Australian House of Assembly.

== Leadership ==
Legislative Council

- President of the Legislative Council: John Morphett
- Clerk of the Legislative Council: Francis Corbet Singleton
- Clerk's assistant and Sergeant-at-arms: Joseph George Atkinson Branthwaite

House of Assembly

- Speaker of the House of Assembly: George Strickland Kingston
- Clerk of the House of Assembly: George William de la Poer Beresford
- Clerk's assistant and Sargeant-at-arms: James Newnham Blackmore (until 16 January 1866), Simon Pierse Creagh (from 16 January 1866)

== Membership ==
=== Legislative Council ===
8 of the 18 seats in the upper house were contested in the election on 1 March 1865. Members elected in 1865 are marked with an asterisk (*).

▌ Henry Ayers*
▌ Charles Hervey Bagot*
▌ John Tuthill Bagot*
▌ John Baker
▌ John Henry Barrow
▌ John Crozier
▌ Thomas Elder
▌ Thomas English*
▌ Charles George Everard

▌ John Hodgkiss
▌ Thomas Hogarth
▌ Henry Mildred
▌ William Morgan*
▌ John Morphett*
▌ William Parkin*
▌ William Peacock
▌ Emanuel Solomon
▌ William Wedd Tuxford*

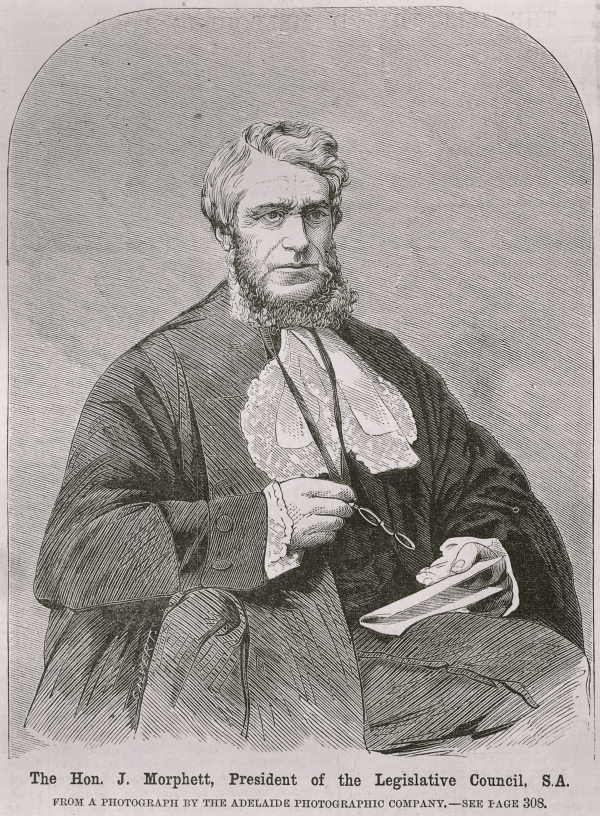
Legislative Council President
John Morphett

=== House of Assembly ===
All 36 seats in the lower house were contested in the election on 1–13 March 1865.

Barossa

▌ Walter Duffield
▌ James Martin

The Burra

▌ Alexander McCulloch
▌ John Bentham Neales

East Adelaide

▌ Thomas Reynolds
▌ Philip Santo

East Torrens

▌ Daniel Fisher
▌ Randolph Isham Stow

Encounter Bay

▌ William Everard
▌ David Sutherland

Flinders

▌ Augustine Stow
▌ John Williams

Gumeracha

▌ Arthur Blyth
▌ Alexander Hay

Light

▌ Patrick Boyce Coglin
▌ John Rounsevell

Mount Barker

▌ John Dunn, sen.
▌ James Rankine

Noarlunga

▌ John Carr
▌ John Colton

Onkaparinga

▌ William Milne
▌ William Townsend

Port Adelaide

▌ David Bower
▌ Jacob William Smith

Stanley

▌ Henry Edward Bright
▌ George Strickland Kingston

The Sturt

▌ Richard Bullock Andrews
▌ Alexander Murray

Victoria

▌ John Riddoch
▌ James Umpherston

West Adelaide

▌ James Boucaut
▌ Henry Robert Fuller

West Torrens

▌ John Pickering
▌ Henry Bull Templer Strangways

Yatala

▌ Wentworth Cavenagh
▌ Lavington Glyde

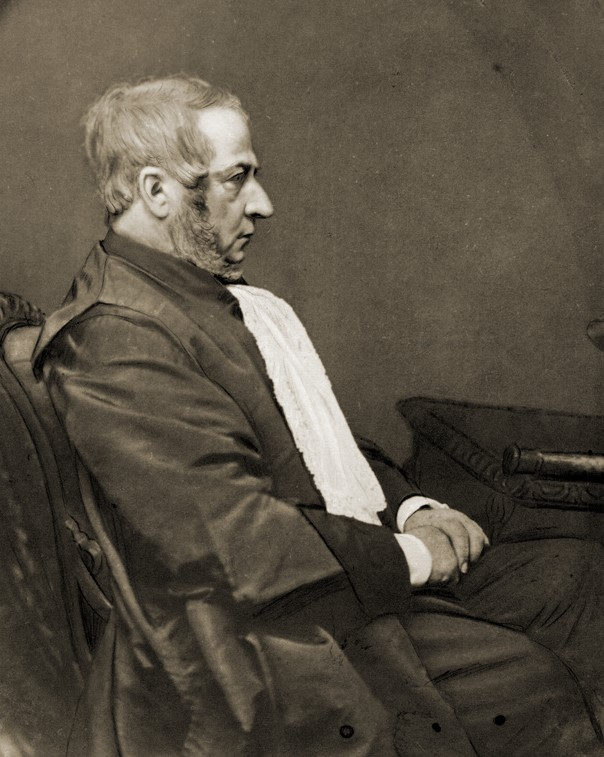
House of Assembly Speaker
George Strickland Kingston

== Changes of membership ==
=== Legislative Council ===
Before	Change		After	
Member	Type	Date	Date	Member
George Fife Angas	Resigned	28 August 1866	26 September 1866	John Tuthill Bagot
Charles Bonney	Resigned	28 August 1866	26 November 1866	William Parkin
Edward McEllister	Died	28 August 1866	26 September 1866	Henry Mildred
Judah Moss Solomon	Resigned	28 August 1866	26 September 1866	Thomas Hogarth
Samuel Davenport	Resigned	30 August 1866	26 September 1866	John Hodgkiss
George Hall	Died	9 July 1867	6 August 1867	Emanuel Solomon
Thomas Magarey	Resigned	9 July 1867	6 August 1867	William Morgan
Abraham Scott	Resigned	9 July 1867	6 August 1867	John Crozier

=== House of Assembly ===
Seat	Before	Change		After	
Seat	Member	Type	Date	Date	Member
Noarlunga	William Henry Trimmer	Resigned	31 March 1865	11 April 1865	John Carr
Light	Francis Stacker Dutton	Accepted office of profit	29 September 1865	12 October 1865	John Rounsevell
Port Adelaide	John Hart, sen.	Resigned	28 March 1866	29 June 1866	Jacob William Smith
Flinders	Alfred Watts	Resigned	15 September 1866	20 October 1866	Augustine Stow
The Burra	George William Cole	Resigned	28 September 1866	15 October 1866	Alexander McCulloch
Victoria	Adam Lindsay Gordon	Resigned	10 November 1866	13 December 1866	James Umpherston
East Torrens	Charles Henry Goode	Resigned	22 November 1866	3 December 1866	Randolph Isham Stow
Gumeracha	Alexander Borthwick Murray	Resigned	27 June 1867	15 July 1867	Alexander Hay
East Torrens	Neville Blyth	Resigned	9 July 1867	22 July 1867	Daniel Fisher
The Sturt	Joseph Peacock	Died	25 July 1867	14 August 1867	Alexander Murray

== See also ==
- Members of the South Australian Legislative Council, 1865–1869
- Members of the South Australian House of Assembly, 1865–1868
