= Members of the South Australian House of Assembly, 1865–1868 =

This is a list of members of the fourth parliament of the South Australian House of Assembly, which sat from 31 March 1865 until 26 March 1868. The members were elected at the 1865 colonial election.

Name	Electorate	Term in Office
Richard Andrews	The Sturt	1857–1860, 1862–1870
Hon Arthur Blyth	Gumeracha	1857–1868, 1870–1877
Neville Blyth ^{[9]}	East Torrens	1860–1867, 1868–1870, 1871, 1877–1878
James Boucaut	West Adelaide	1861–1862, 1865–1870, 1871–1878
Henry Bright	Stanley	1865–1884
David Bower	Port Adelaide	1865–1870, 1875–1887
John Carr ^{[1]}	Noarlunga	1865–1879, 1881–1884
Wentworth Cavenagh	Yatala	1862–1875, 1875–1881
Patrick Coglin	Light	1860–1868, 1870–1871, 1875–1881, 1882–1887
George William Cole ^{[5]}	The Burra	1860–1866
John Colton	Noarlunga	1862–1870, 1875–1878, 1880–1887
Walter Duffield	Barossa	1857–1868, 1870–1871
John Dunn	Mount Barker	1857–1868, 1868
Francis Dutton ^{[2]}	Light	1857–1862, 1862–1865
William Everard	Encounter Bay	1865–1870, 1871–1872
Daniel Fisher ^{[9]}	East Torrens	1867–1870
Henry Fuller	West Adelaide	1865–1870
Lavington Glyde	Yatala	1857–1875, 1877–1884
Charles Goode ^{[7]}	East Torrens	1865–1866
Adam Lindsay Gordon ^{[6]}	Victoria	1865–1866
Alexander Hay ^{[8]}	Gumeracha	1857–1861, 1867–1871
John Hart ^{[3]}	Port Adelaide	1857–1859, 1862–1866, 1868–1873
George Kingston	Stanley	1857–1860, 1861–1880
James Martin	Barossa	1865–1868
Alexander McCulloch ^{[5]}	The Burra	1866–1868
William Milne	Onkaparinga	1857–1868
Alexander Borthwick Murray ^{[8]}	Gumeracha	1862–1867
Alexander Murray ^{[10]}	The Sturt	1867–1868
John Bentham Neales	The Burra	1857–1860, 1862–1870
Joseph Peacock ^{[10]}	The Sturt	1860–1867
John Pickering	West Torrens	1865–1868, 1870, 1871–1878
James Rankine	Mount Barker	1865–1868
Hon Thomas Reynolds	East Adelaide	1857–1862, 1862, 1864–1870, 1871–1872, 1872–1873
John Riddoch	Victoria	1865–1870, 1871–1873
John Rounsevell ^{[2]}	Light	1865–1868, 1880–1881
Philip Santo	East Adelaide	1860–1870
Jacob Smith ^{[3]}	Port Adelaide	1866–1868
Augustine Stow ^{[4]}	Flinders	1862–1865, 1866–1868
Randolph Isham Stow ^{[7]}	East Torrens	1861–1865, 1866–1868, 1873–1875
Hon Henry Strangways	West Torrens	1858–1871
David Sutherland	Encounter Bay	1860–1862, 1862–1868
William Townsend	Onkaparinga	1857–1882
William Trimmer ^{[1]}	Noarlunga	1865
James Umpherston ^{[6]}	Victoria	1866–1868
Alfred Watts ^{[4]}	Flinders	1862–1866, 1868–1875
John Williams	Flinders	1864–1868, 1875–1878

== Notes ==
^{1} Noarlunga MHA William Trimmer had been elected on a technicality after return from one polling place was declared invalid. He resigned at the first sitting, leaving John Carr as the duly elected member.
^{2} Light MHA Francis Dutton accepted the office of South Australia's Agent General in London on 29 September 1865. John Rounsevell won the resulting by-election on 12 October, but his seat was declared vacant on 16 November. He then won a second by-election on 27 November.
^{3} Port Adelaide MHA John Hart resigned on 28 March 1866. Jacob Smith won the resulting by-election on 29 June.
^{4} Flinders MHA Alfred Watts resigned on 15 September 1866. Augustine Stow won the resulting by-election on 20 October.
^{5} The Burra MHA George Cole resigned on 28 September 1866. Alexander McCulloch won the resulting by-election on 15 October.
^{6} Victoria MHA Adam Lindsay Gordon resigned on 10 November 1866. James Umpherston won the resulting by-election on 13 December.
^{7} East Torrens MHA Charles Goode resigned on 22 November 1866. Randolph Isham Stow won the resulting by-election on 3 December.
^{8} Gumeracha MHA Alexander Borthwick Murray resigned on 27 June 1867. Alexander Hay won the resulting by-election on 15 July.
^{9} East Torrens MHA Neville Blyth resigned on 9 July 1867. Daniel Fisher won the resulting by-election on 22 July.
^{10} The Sturt MHA Joseph Peacock died on 25 July 1867. Alexander Murray won the resulting by-election on 14 August.
