= 1868 South Australian House of Assembly election =

1868 South Australian colonial election (House of Assembly)
- 6 April – 4 May 1868
- All 36 seats in the South Australian House of Assembly
- Turnout: 11,243 (46.9%)
Party	Leader	Vote %	Seats	+/–
Independents	N/A	100.0	36	0
This lists parties that won seats. See the complete results below.
Premier before	Premier after
Henry Ayers	Henry Ayers

The 1868 South Australian House of Assembly election was held between 6 April and 4 May 1868 to elect all 36 members of the South Australian House of Assembly as part of the 1868 South Australian colonial election.

== Overall results ==
House of Assembly (AV) – Turnout 46.9% (Non-CV)
Party	Votes			Seats	
Party	Votes	%	Swing (pp)	Seats	Change
Independent	18,070	100.0	±0.0	36	Steady
Total	18,070	100.0	–	36	
Formal votes	10,869	96.7	–		
Informal votes	374	3.3	–		
Turnout	11,243	46.9	–		
Enrolled voters	23,982	–	–		
Source: Electoral Commission of South Australia

== Results by district ==
=== Uncontested ===
Electoral district	Members elected
The Burra	James Boucaut; John Neales
Encounter Bay	Neville Blyth; William Everard
Noarlunga	John Carr; John Colton

=== Barossa ===
1868 South Australian colonial election: Barossa
Candidate	Votes	%	±
Richard Chaffey Baker (elected 1)	283	38.5	+38.5
Philip Santo (elected 2)	277	37.7	+37.7
Joseph Skelton	175	23.8	+23.8
Total formal votes	458	99.3	+99.3
Informal votes	3	0.7	+0.7
Turnout	461	35.6	+35.6

=== East Adelaide ===
1868 South Australian colonial election: East Adelaide
Candidate	Votes	%	±
Thomas Reynolds (elected 1)	458	36.8	−10.2
Robert Cottrell (elected 2)	400	32.2	+32.2
James Boucaut	386	31.0	+31.0
Total formal votes	815	95.4	−3.0
Informal votes	39	4.6	+3.0
Turnout	854	61.9	+36.0

=== East Torrens ===
1868 South Australian colonial election: East Torrens
Candidate	Votes	%	±
Daniel Fisher (elected 1)	464	29.4	+6.8
George Pearce (elected 2)	369	23.4	+23.4
Augustine Stow	350	22.2	+22.2
Boyle Travers Finniss	345	21.8	+21.8
Samuel Raphael	52	3.3	+3.3
Total formal votes	880	98.3	+1.2
Informal votes	15	1.7	−1.2
Turnout	895	56.1	−16.1

=== Flinders ===
1868 South Australian colonial election: Flinders
Candidate	Votes	%	±
Alfred Watts (elected 1)	128	34.2	−0.7
William Ranson Mortlock (elected 2)	126	33.7	+33.7
Hampton Gleeson	120	32.1	+32.1
Total formal votes	237	94.0	–
Informal votes	15	6.0	–
Turnout	252	17.7	–

=== Gumeracha ===
1868 South Australian colonial election: Gumeracha
Candidate	Votes	%	±
Alexander Hay (elected 1)	308	31.9	+31.9
William Sandover (elected 2)	226	23.4	+23.4
John Robertson	167	17.3	+17.3
Ebenezer Ward	166	17.2	+17.2
Arthur Hardy	98	10.2	+10.2
Total formal votes	584	95.9	+95.9
Informal votes	25	4.1	+4.1
Turnout	609	43.7	+43.7

=== Light ===
1868 South Australian colonial election: Light
Candidate	Votes	%	±
John Hart (elected 1)	636	33.5	+33.5
William Lewis (elected 2)	629	33.1	+33.1
GM Allen	392	20.7	+20.7
HFA Kruger	223	11.7	+11.7
John Barrow	18	1.0	+1.0
Total formal votes	1,148	97.7	+1.6
Informal votes	27	2.3	−1.6
Turnout	1,175	47.9	−46.1

=== Mount Barker ===
1868 South Australian colonial election: Mount Barker
Candidate	Votes	%	±
John Cheriton (elected 1)	606	35.4	+35.4
William Rogers (elected 2)	561	32.8	+32.8
John Dunn	544	31.8	−3.7
Total formal votes	1,074	96.0	−1.2
Informal votes	45	4.0	+1.2
Turnout	1,119	67.3	−8.6

=== Onkaparinga ===
1868 South Australian colonial election: Onkaparinga
Candidate	Votes	%	±
William Townsend (elected 1)	409	44.4	+6.8
Thomas Playford (elected 2)	307	33.3	+33.3
Friedrich Krichauff	205	22.3	+22.3
Total formal votes	593	95.5	+1.6
Informal votes	28	4.5	−1.6
Turnout	621	43.4	−22.8

=== Port Adelaide ===
1868 South Australian colonial election: Port Adelaide
Candidate	Votes	%	±
David Bower (elected 1)	828	33.1	+5.0
Henry Hill (elected 2)	707	28.2	+28.2
Patrick Boyce Coglin	665	26.6	+5.0
W Sagar	303	12.1	+12.1
Total formal votes	1,526	99.0	+2.1
Informal votes	16	1.0	−2.1
Turnout	1,542	52.7	−9.8

=== Stanley ===
1868 South Australian colonial election: Stanley
Candidate	Votes	%	±
Henry Edward Bright (elected 1)	457	45.2	+3.4
George Strickland Kingston (elected 2)	331	32.7	−14.7
GM Allen	191	18.9	+18.9
J Watts	33	3.3	+3.3
Total formal votes	616	98.6	+7.1
Informal votes	9	1.4	−7.1
Turnout	625	33.1	+5.3

=== The Sturt ===
1868 South Australian colonial election: The Sturt
Candidate	Votes	%	±
Joseph Fisher (elected 1)	266	42.2	+42.2
Richard Bullock Andrews (elected 2)	239	37.9	+37.9
Alexander Murray	114	18.1	+18.1
Edward Collett Homersham	12	1.9	+1.9
Total formal votes	362	94.8	+94.8
Informal votes	20	5.2	+5.2
Turnout	382	44.5	+44.5

=== Victoria ===
1868 South Australian colonial election: Victoria
Candidate	Votes	%	±
John Riddoch (elected 1)	681	41.6	+8.4
Henry Kent Hughes (elected 2)	551	33.7	+33.7
William Alexander E West	404	24.7	+24.7
Total formal votes	957	96.3	+0.7
Informal votes	37	3.7	−0.7
Turnout	994	51.1	+0.9

=== West Adelaide ===
1868 South Australian colonial election: West Adelaide
Candidate	Votes	%	±
William Knox Simms (elected 1)	426	38.1	+38.1
Henry Robert Fuller (elected 2)	400	35.8	+5.4
Samuel Raphael	292	26.1	+26.1
Total formal votes	684	96.2	−1.0
Informal votes	27	3.8	+1.0
Turnout	711	41.9	−31.3

=== West Torrens ===
1868 South Australian colonial election: West Torrens
Candidate	Votes	%	±
George Bean (elected 1)	358	27.9	+27.9
Henry Strangways (elected 2)	326	25.4	−15.9
John Pickering	324	25.3	+25.3
John Temple Sagar	275	21.4	+21.4
Total formal votes	675	92.8	+0.1
Informal votes	52	7.2	−0.1
Turnout	727	60.6	−7.9

=== Yatala ===
1868 South Australian colonial election: Yatala
Candidate	Votes	%	±
Wentworth Cavenagh (elected 1)	196	42.7	+42.7
Lavington Glyde (elected 2)	176	38.3	+38.3
John Pirt	87	19.0	+19.0
Total formal votes	260	94.2	+94.2
Informal votes	16	5.8	+5.8
Turnout	276	33.0	+33.0
