= 5th Parliament of South Australia =

1868–1870 meeting of the South Australian Parliament

Fifth Parliament of South Australia
←	4th	6th	→
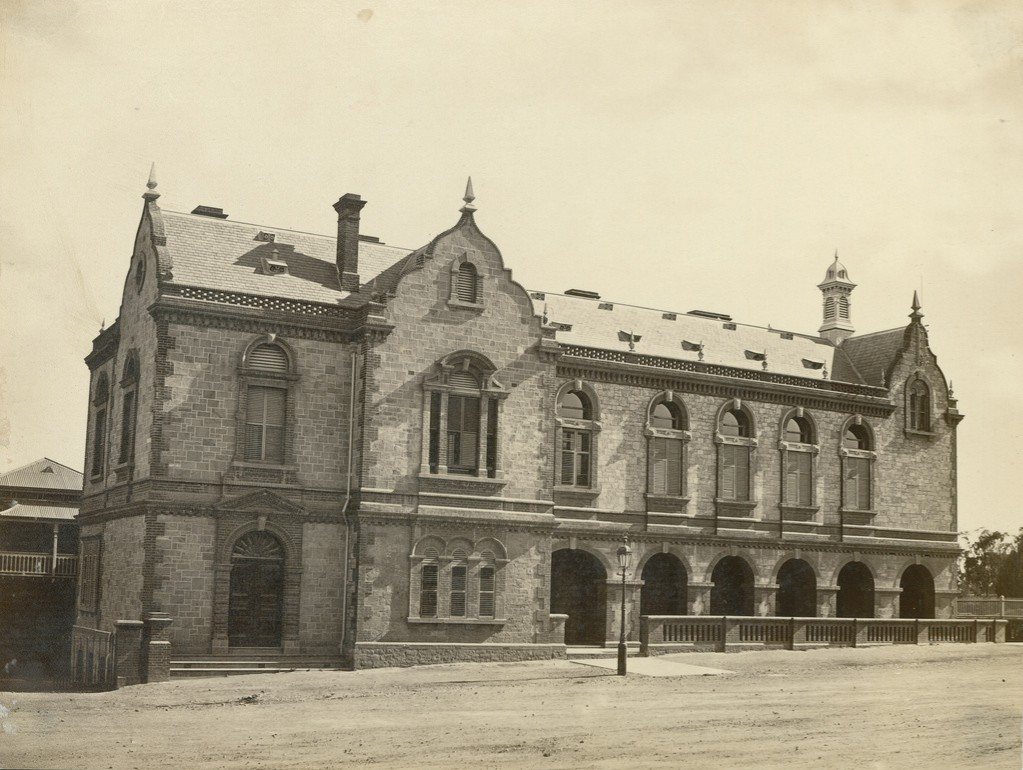
- Old Parliament House (1872)

Overview
- Legislative body: Parliament of South Australia
- Meeting place: Old Parliament House
- Term: 31 July 1868 – 2 March 1870
- Election: 6 April – 4 May 1868

Legislative Council
- Members: 18
- President: John Morphett

House of Assembly
- Members: 36
- Speaker: George Strickland Kingston

Sessions
- 1st: 31 July 1868 – 30 January 1869
- 2nd: 30 July 1869 – 23 February 1870

The 5th Parliament of South Australia was a meeting of the legislative branch of the South Australian state government, composed of the South Australian Legislative Council and the South Australian House of Assembly.

== Leadership ==
Legislative Council

- President of the Legislative Council: John Morphett
- Clerk of the Legislative Council: Francis Corbet Singleton
- Clerk's assistant and Sergeant-at-arms: Joseph George Atkinson Branthwaite

House of Assembly

- Speaker of the House of Assembly: George Strickland Kingston
- Clerk of the House of Assembly: George William de la Poer Beresford
- Clerk's assistant and Sargeant-at-arms: Simon Pierse Creagh (until 24 December 1869), Edwin Gordon Blackmore (from 24 December 1869)

== Membership ==
=== Legislative Council ===
==== Until 19 March 1869 ====
▌ Henry Ayers*
▌ Charles Hervey Bagot*
▌ John Tuthill Bagot*
▌ John Baker
▌ John Henry Barrow
▌ John Crozier
▌ Thomas Elder
▌ Thomas English*
▌ Charles George Everard

▌ John Hodgkiss
▌ Thomas Hogarth
▌ Henry Mildred
▌ William Morgan*
▌ John Morphett*
▌ William Parkin*
▌ William Peacock
▌ Emanuel Solomon
▌ William Wedd Tuxford*

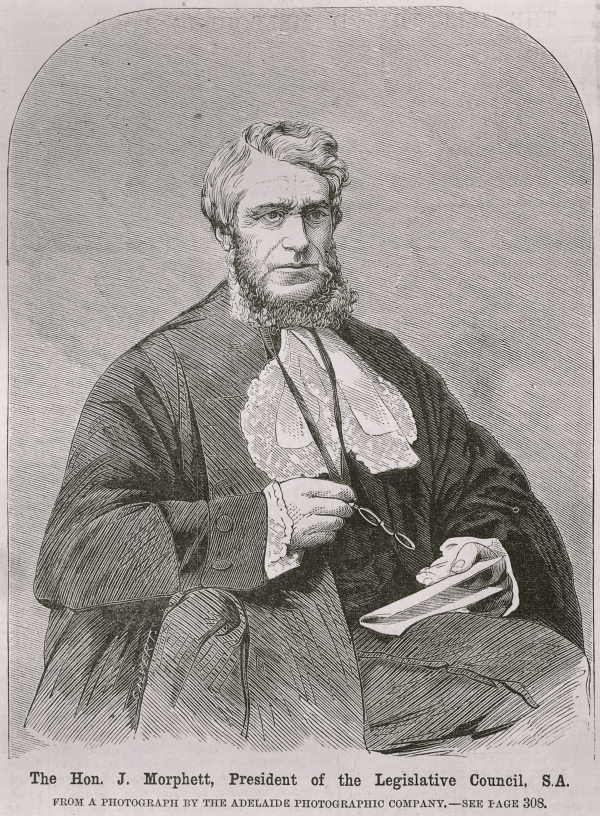
Legislative Council President
John Morphett

==== From 19 March 1869 ====
7 of the 18 seats in the upper house were contested in the election on 19 March 1869. Members elected in 1869 are marked with an asterisk (*).

▌ Henry Ayers
▌ John Tuthill Bagot
▌ John Baker*
▌ John Henry Barrow*
▌ John Crozier
▌ John Dunn, sen.*
▌ Thomas English*
▌ John Hodgkiss
▌ Thomas Hogarth

▌ Henry Mildred
▌ William Milne*
▌ William Morgan
▌ John Morphett
▌ Alexander Borthwick Murray*
▌ William Parkin
▌ Emanuel Solomon
▌ Augustine Stow*
▌ William Wedd Tuxford

=== House of Assembly ===
All 36 seats in the lower house were contested in the election on 6 April – 4 May 1868.

Barossa

▌ Richard Chaffey Baker
▌ Philip Santo

The Burra

▌ James Boucaut
▌ John Bentham Neales

East Adelaide

▌ Robert Cottrell
▌ Thomas Reynolds

East Torrens

▌ Daniel Fisher
▌ George Pearce

Encounter Bay

▌ Neville Blyth
▌ William Everard

Flinders

▌ William Ranson Mortlock
▌ Alfred Watts

Gumeracha

▌ Alexander Hay
▌ William Sandover

Light

▌ John Hart, sen.
▌ William Lewis

Mount Barker

▌ John Cheriton
▌ William Rogers

Noarlunga

▌ John Carr
▌ John Colton

Onkaparinga

▌ Thomas Playford
▌ William Townsend

Port Adelaide

▌ David Bower
▌ Henry Hill

Stanley

▌ Henry Edward Bright
▌ George Strickland Kingston

The Sturt

▌ Joseph Fisher
▌ Frederick Spicer

Victoria

▌ Henry Kent Hughes
▌ John Riddoch

West Adelaide

▌ Henry Robert Fuller
▌ William Knox Simms

West Torrens

▌ John Pickering
▌ Henry Bull Templer Strangways

Yatala

▌ Wentworth Cavenagh
▌ Lavington Glyde

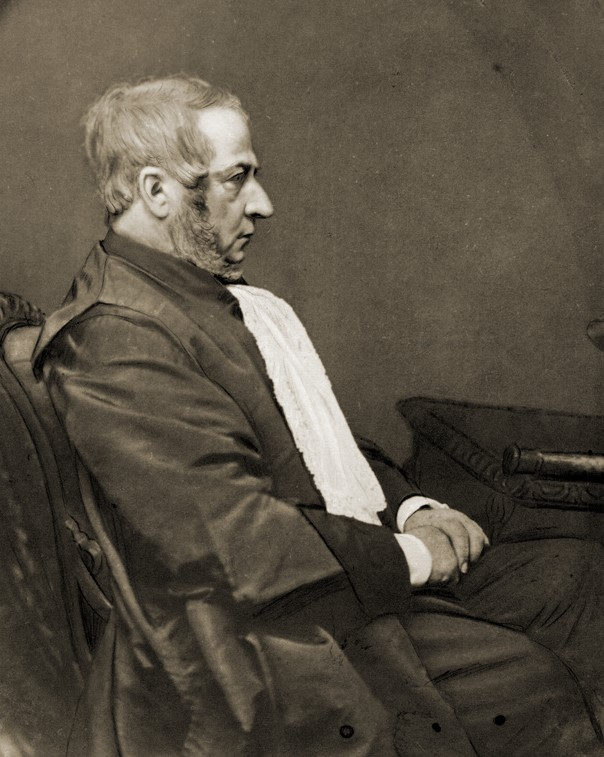
House of Assembly Speaker
George Strickland Kingston

== Changes of membership ==
=== House of Assembly ===
Seat	Before	Change		After	
Seat	Member	Type	Date	Date	Member
Mount Barker	John Cheriton	Unseated	11 August 1868	3 September 1868	John Cheriton
Mount Barker	William Rogers	Unseated	11 August 1868	3 September 1868	John Dunn, sen.
Mount Barker	John Dunn, sen.	Unseated	9 October 1868	5 November 1868	William Rogers
The Sturt	Richard Bullock Andrews	Resigned	18 January 1870	10 February 1870	Frederick Spicer
West Torrens	George Thomas Bean	Failure to attend	20 January 1870	10 February 1870	John Pickering

== See also ==
- Members of the South Australian Legislative Council, 1865–1869
- Members of the South Australian Legislative Council, 1869–1873
- Members of the South Australian House of Assembly, 1868–1870
