= 1865 South Australian House of Assembly election =

1865 South Australian colonial election (House of Assembly)
- 1–13 March 1865
- All 36 seats in the South Australian House of Assembly
- Turnout: N/A (Note: Turnout and informal voting details were not published for Flinders. In the other 11 electorates, the turnout was 8,256 (62.1%), the formal vote was 7,804 (93.4%) and the informal vote was 452 (6.6%).)
Party	Leader	Vote %	Seats	+/–
Independents	N/A	100.0	36	0
This lists parties that won seats. See the complete results below.
Premier before	Premier after
Arthur Blyth	Francis Dutton

The 1865 South Australian House of Assembly election was held between 1 and 13 March 1865 to elect all 36 members of the South Australian House of Assembly as part of the 1865 South Australian colonial election.

== Overall results ==
House of Assembly (AV) – Turnout N/A (Non-CV)
Party	Votes			Seats	
Party	Votes	%	Swing (pp)	Seats	Change
Independent	13,339	100.0	±0.0	36	Steady
Total	13,339	100.0	–	36	
Formal votes	N/A	–	–		
Informal votes	N/A	–	–		
Turnout	N/A	–	–		
Enrolled voters	14,256	–	–		
Source: Electoral Commission of South Australia

== Results by district ==
=== Uncontested ===
Electoral district	Members elected
The Burra	George Cole; John Neales
Barossa	Walter Duffield; James Martin
Encounter Bay	William Everard; David Sutherland
Gumeracha	Arthur Blyth; Alexander Borthwick Murray
The Sturt	Richard Bullock Andrews; Joseph Peacock
Yatala	Wentworth Cavenagh; Lavington Glyde

=== East Adelaide ===
1865 South Australian colonial election: East Adelaide
Candidate	Votes	%	±
Thomas Reynolds (elected 1)	258	47.0	+47.0
Philip Santo (elected 2)	246	44.8	+17.9
Edward Thomas Beauchamp	45	8.2	+8.2
Total formal votes	303	98.4	+2.6
Informal votes	5	1.6	–2.6
Turnout	308	25.9	–12.0

=== East Torrens ===
1865 South Australian colonial election: East Torrens
Candidate	Votes	%	±
Charles Henry Goode (elected 1)	563	40.4	+40.4
Neville Blyth (elected 2)	516	37.0	+0.3
Daniel Fisher	315	22.6	+22.6
Total formal votes	861	97.1	–0.3
Informal votes	26	2.9	+0.3
Turnout	887	72.2	+25.4

=== Flinders ===
1865 South Australian colonial election: Flinders
Candidate	Votes	%	±
Alfred Watts (elected 1)	58	34.9	–5.6
John Williams (elected 2)	47	28.3	+28.3
RA Fiveash	34	20.5	+20.5
AJ Murray	27	16.3	–7.8
Total formal votes	N/A	–	–
Informal votes	N/A	–	–
Turnout	N/A	–	–

=== Light ===
1865 South Australian colonial election: Light
Candidate	Votes	%	±
Francis Dutton (elected 1)	544	40.4	+4.3
Patrick Boyce Coglin (elected 2)	371	27.6	+27.6
Joseph Mellor	310	23.0	+23.0
Edward Grundy	83	6.2	+6.2
HC Palmer	28	2.1	+2.1
James Fawsett	9	0.7	+0.7
Total formal votes	757	96.1	–
Informal votes	31	3.9	–
Turnout	788	94.0	–

=== Mount Barker ===
1865 South Australian colonial election: Mount Barker
Candidate	Votes	%	±
James Rankine (elected 1)	677	35.7	+35.7
John Dunn (elected 2)	674	35.5	–3.3
Lloyd Herbert	545	28.7	+28.7
Total formal votes	1,242	97.2	+0.5
Informal votes	36	2.8	–0.5
Turnout	1,278	75.9	+30.1

=== Noarlunga ===
1865 South Australian colonial election: Noarlunga
Candidate	Votes	%	±
John Colton (elected 1)	280	41.2	+20.3
William Trimmer (elected 2)	224	33.0	+33.0
John Carr	175	25.8	+12.2
Total formal votes	330	57.7	–38.9
Informal votes	242	42.3	+38.9
Turnout	572	54.9	+12.1

=== Onkaparinga ===
1865 South Australian colonial election: Onkaparinga
Candidate	Votes	%	±
William Milne (elected 1)	517	38.2	–2.2
William Townsend (elected 2)	509	37.6	–7.1
A Lorimer	329	24.3	+24.3
Total formal votes	785	93.9	+2.1
Informal votes	51	6.1	–2.1
Turnout	836	66.2	+31.5

=== Port Adelaide ===
1865 South Australian colonial election: Port Adelaide
Candidate	Votes	%	±
David Bower (elected 1)	491	38.1	+38.1
John Hart (elected 2)	486	27.9	–16.9
Henry Edward Downer	377	21.6	+21.6
Patrick Boyce Coglin	243	13.9	–19.8
William Dale	148	8.5	+8.5
Total formal votes	1,112	96.9	–2.5
Informal votes	36	3.1	+2.5
Turnout	1,148	62.5	+14.1

=== Stanley ===
1865 South Australian colonial election: Stanley
Candidate	Votes	%	±
George Strickland Kingston (elected 1)	329	47.4	+8.6
Henry Edward Bright (elected 2)	291	41.8	+41.8
HC Palmer	75	10.8	+10.8
Total formal votes	140	91.5	–1.7
Informal votes	13	8.5	+1.7
Turnout	153	27.8	–20.6

=== Victoria ===
1865 South Australian colonial election: Victoria
Candidate	Votes	%	±
Adam Lindsay Gordon (elected 1)	378	33.9	+33.9
John Riddoch (elected 2)	370	33.2	+33.2
Randolph Isham Stow	367	32.9	+32.9
Total formal votes	744	95.6	+95.6
Informal votes	34	4.4	+4.4
Turnout	778	50.2	+50.2

=== West Adelaide ===
1865 South Australian colonial election: West Adelaide
Candidate	Votes	%	±
James Boucaut (elected 1)	455	30.8	+30.8
Henry Robert Fuller (elected 2)	450	30.4	+8.2
James Crabb Verco	318	21.5	–5.1
Tom Cox Bray	246	16.6	+16.6
Edward Montgomery Martin	9	0.6	+0.6
Total formal votes	907	97.2	+1.4
Informal votes	25	2.8	–1.4
Turnout	932	73.2	+38.7

=== West Torrens ===
1865 South Australian colonial election: West Torrens
Candidate	Votes	%	±
Henry Strangways (elected 1)	381	41.3	+8.7
John Pickering (elected 2)	271	29.4	+3.5
William Parkin	242	26.2	+26.2
Edward Collett Homersham	28	3.0	3.0
Total formal votes	533	92.7	+3.1
Informal votes	42	7.3	–3.1
Turnout	575	68.5	+26.3

== See also ==
- 1865 South Australian Legislative Council election
