= Coonawarra railway station =

Former railway station in South Australia, Australia

Coonawarra
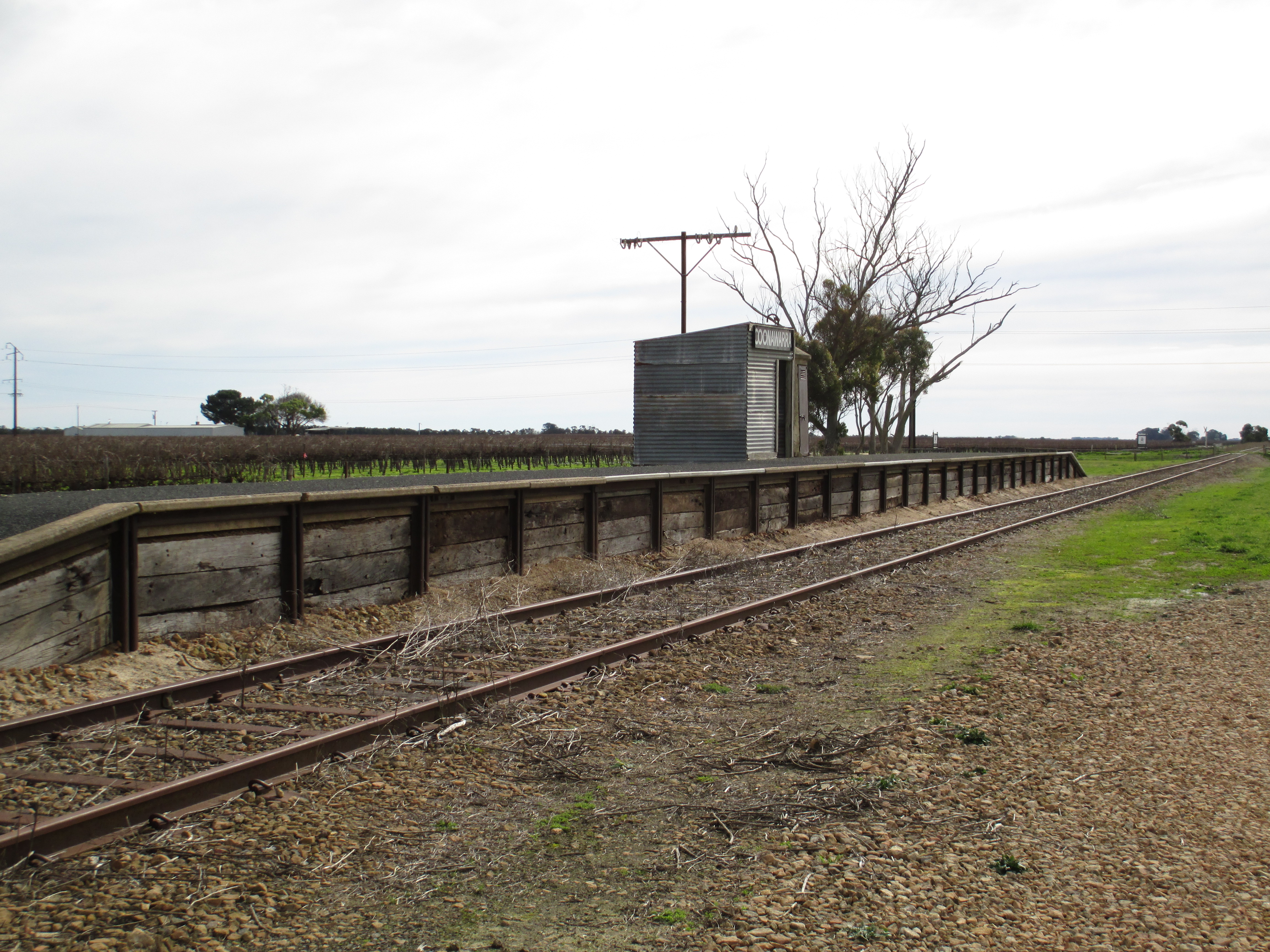
- Coonawarra railway station (27 July 2014)

General information
- Location: Giles Road, Coonawarra, South Australia
- Coordinates: 37.291911413496386°S 140.8192957171081°E
- Operator: Australian National
- Line: Mount Gambier line
- Distance: 376 kilometres from Adelaide
- Platforms: 1
- Tracks: 1

Construction
- Structure type: Ground

Other information
- Status: Closed

History
- Opened: 14 June 1887
- Closed: 31 December 1990 (passengers); 12 April 1995 (freight); 2000 (tourist)

Services
Preceding station	Limestone Coast Railway	Following station
Glenroy towards Adelaide	Mount Gambier railway line	Penola towards Mount Gambier
Location

Coonawarra railway station was located on the Mount Gambier railway line. It served the town of Coonawarra.

== History ==
Coonawarra railway station opened on 14 June 1887 when the railway line was extended from Naracoorte south towards Mount Gambier. The railway siding was built in 1898 by John Riddoch. It consisted of a platform and a shed for passengers.

The Mount Gambier line was gauge converted to broad gauge in 1953 with the narrow gauge line being removed completely by 1959.

The station closed on 31 December 1990 when the Adelaide-Mount Gambier passenger service ceased but the line still continued to be used by freight. When the Adelaide-Melbourne railway line was converted to standard gauge, the Mount Gambier line was not converted and closed on 12 April 1995. The tourist Limestone Coast Railway ran from Mount Gambier to Coonawarra with South Australian Railways Redhen railcars from 1998 until the year 2000.

A rail trail was built from Penola to Coonawarra during 2021/22 with the trail opening in November 2022.
