= Henry Cheetham (pastor) =

Congregational minister (1801–1881)

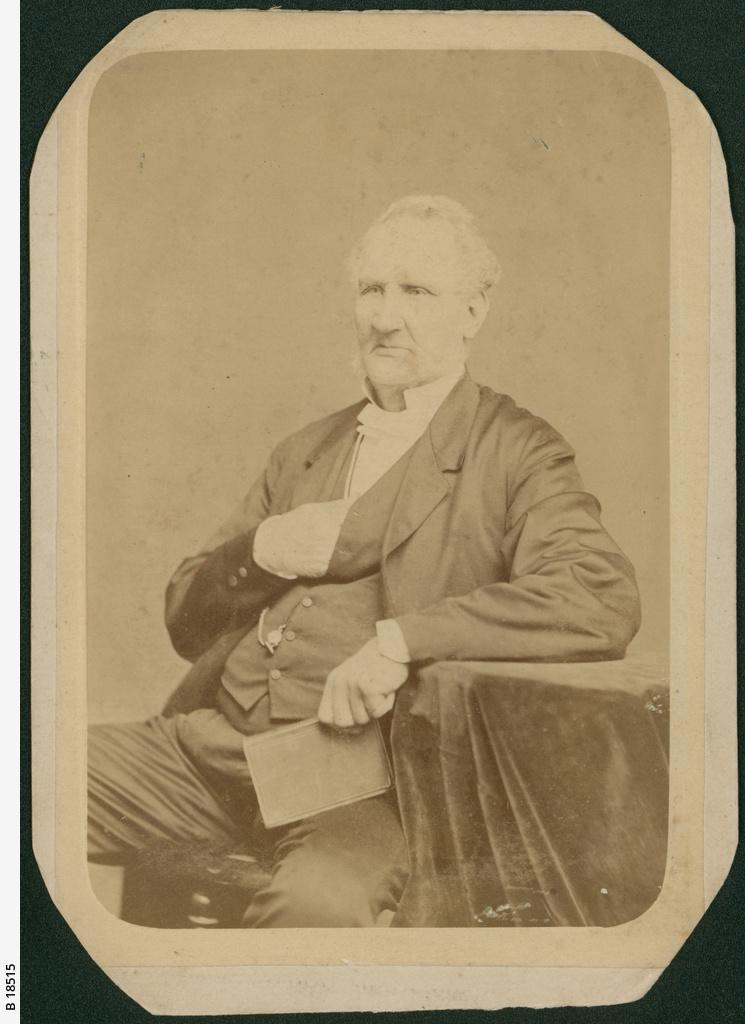
- Born: 5 March 1801; Rochdale, Lancashire, England
- Died: 1 September 1881 (aged 80)
- Religion: Christian: Congregationalist

Henry Cheetham (5 March 1801 – 1 September 1881) was a Congregational minister in the early days of colonial South Australia.

== History ==
Henry Cheetham has born in Rochdale, Lancashire, England, on March 5, 1801. Early in 1815 he enlisted with the 51st Regiment of Light Infantry, with which he served for twelve years, and was present at the Battle of Waterloo. He then kept a school near Rochdale for five or six years, meanwhile studying for the ministry under the Rev. Ely, was ordained in 1833, and served the Sunsmit (near Rochdale) church for some fifteen years.

He migrated to South Australia with his wife and family aboard the Asiatic, arriving in Adelaide in December 1849. He settled at the Burra, where he founded a well-attended church. In late 1851 he accepted a call to the Congregational Church in High Street, Kensington, which was at a low ebb. He commenced his pastorate there on the first Sunday in 1852, and over the next two years did much to restore its fortunes, founding a Sunday School, over which he was to preside for nearly twenty years.

Around 1851 a splinter group had formed, which left in 1854 to found the Clayton Chapel, but the High Street church progressed apace, and Cheetham's work was greatly appreciated by his congregation, and when he resigned in 1871 many improvements had been made to the chapel, and the church was free of debt. The separation was described in the Press as painful, but the reason ("circumstances over which I have had no control") was not spelled out. In September 1872 Cheetham was accepted as pastor of the Congregational Church at Milang, where he was to serve until shortly before his death.

== Family ==
Cheetham was married to Susanna Cheetham, née Norris (c. 1800 – 10 June 1862). Their children included:

- Mary Ann Cheetham (26 February 1821 – 27 April 1908) married William Evans ( – ), who with his father built Conwy Railway Bridge. She married again, to William Peacock (1790–1874) on 15 June 1871. She married again, on 4 March 1875, to Carrington Smedley (1808–1895).

- James Evans ( – ) secretary of South Australian Gas Company
- Eliza Evans ( –1932) married Francis Daniel Hodge ( –1894) on 1866

- Martha Cheetham (c. 1831 – 13 May 1854)
- Edward Cheetham (c. 1838 – 12 May 1866), a prizewinning student at Adelaide Educational Institution
- Susanna Cheetham (c. 1841 – 29 January 1879) maybe married Hiram Telemachus Mildred on 9 February 1864. Hiram was eldest son of Henry Mildred M.P.

While in Adelaide they lived at Rose Cottage, Norwood.
