= George Feltham Hopkins =

Australian politician

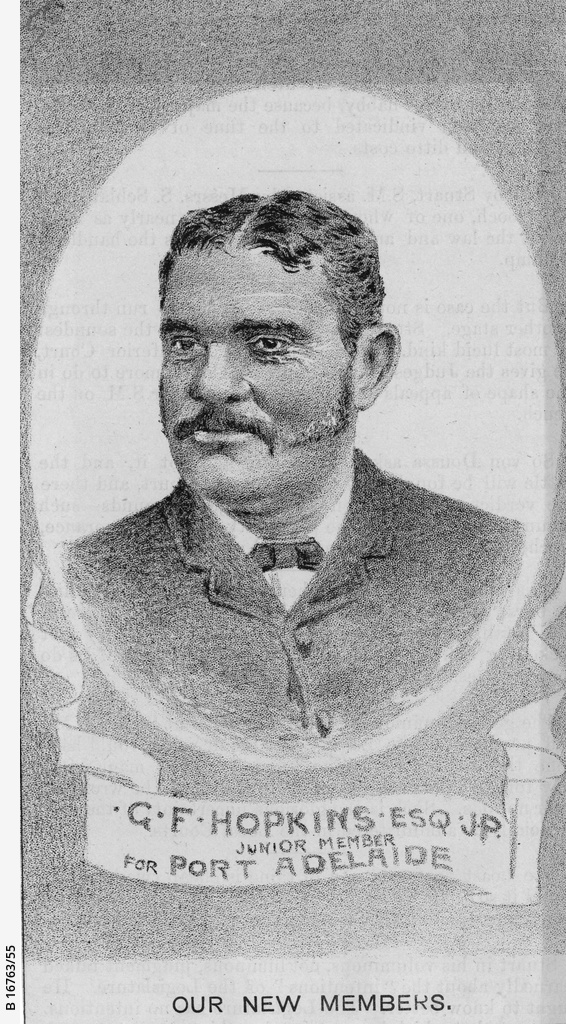

Member of the South Australian House of Assembly for Port Adelaide
- In office 19 March 1887 – 14 April 1893 Serving with William Mattinson
- Preceded by: David Bower
- Succeeded by: Ivor MacGillivray

Personal details
- Born: 4 September 1856 Port Adelaide, South Australia
- Died: 26 January 1897 (aged 40)
- Cause of death: Self-inflicted gunshot to the head
- Occupation: policeman and politician
- Nickname: "Hop" or "Geordy"

George Feltham Hopkins (4 September 1856 – 26 January 1897), informally known as "Hop" or "Geordy", was a politician in colonial South Australia.

He was born in Port Adelaide and educated locally, and in 1875 joined the Mounted Police. In 1877 he was connected with the Coal Company. He was a leader of the dockland strike which lasted fourteen weeks.

He was elected to the seat of Port Adelaide in the South Australian House of Assembly and sat from 19 March 1887 to 14 April 1893. In his campaign speech, Hopkins showed himself in favor of the Totalizator (and blamed the then depression on its discontinuance; that and granting financial aid to local Councils and Corporations, and the Licensing Bench not allowing licences). The powers of the Licensing Bench should be transferred to Councils. He would lease, not sell, Crown lands; he would have protective duties, as high as 25 percent. He would reduce Civil Service salaries (except for the Customs), disallow Chinese immigration, abolish the Sunday Closing Act. He was in favor of free, secular, and compulsory education. He wanted a State Bank and believed in the payment of Members. He was against property tax.

He died on 27 January 1897, following a self-inflicted gunshot to the head and surgical attempts to remove the bullet. He had previously shown signs of depression, and his suicide followed a recent history of financial embarrassment in his business as a wine dealer.

== Family ==
George Feltham Hopkins (8 February 1827 – 27 January 1893) married Clara Cob Haddy (c. 1826 – 7 February 1915) in 1849. He died at Port Augusta after a short illness.

- Zelia Ann Alice Hopkins (1851–1923) married William Nelson Livesey (1847–1927) of the Telegraph Department on 15 July 1869
- George Feltham Hopkins (4 September 1856 – 26 January 1897) married Ann "Annie" Ethel Bailey (4 April 1855 – 18 November 1923) on 23 May 1878; their family included:

- Harcourt Feltham Hopkins, (20 April 1879 – 3 June 1949)
- Percival Bailey Hopkins, (14 September 1883 – 1968)
- Mabel Gertrude Feltham Hopkins (2 May 1888 – 1957) married Joseph Ellis Wing in 1905

- Clara May Hopkins (1858–1936) married Thomas George Smith (c. 1851 – December 1909) on 27 December 1876, lived Hutt Street, Adelaide. She married again, in 1919, to Wallace William Baker ( –1938)
- Francis Feltham Hopkins (1865 – 26 April 1931) married Susanna ( – 24 January 1851)

It is not known whether he was related to Leonard Anver Hopkins (1891–1950), MHA for Barossa 1924–1927 and 1930–1933.
