= 1868 South Australian colonial election =

- 6 April – 4 May 1868

All 36 seats in the South Australian House of Assembly
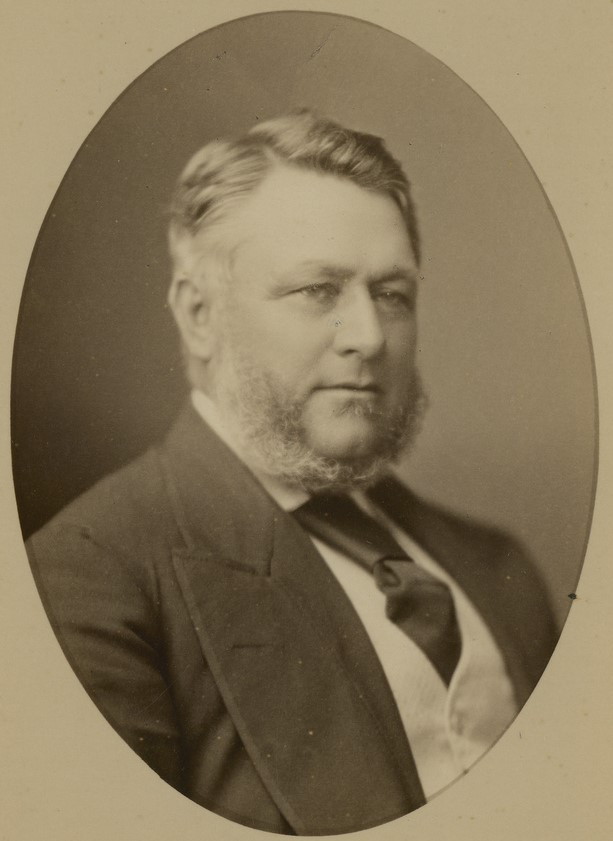
Leader	Henry Ayers
Leader's seat	Legislative Council
- Results by electoral district for the House of Assembly
Premier before election
Henry Ayers
Elected Premier
Henry Ayers

The 1868 South Australian colonial election was held between 6 April and 4 May 1868 to elect members to the 5th Parliament of South Australia. All 36 seats in the House of Assembly (the lower house, whose members were elected at the 1865 election) were up for re-election.

The election used non-compulsory plurality block voting, in which electors voted for as many candidates as they wished. Members of the House of Assembly were elected to 18 multi-member districts consisting of two seats each. Suffrage extended to men (including Aboriginal men) over 21 years of age, unless they were "attainted or convicted of treason or felony".

No parties or solid groupings would be formed until after the 1890 election, which resulted in frequent changes of the Premier. If the incumbent Premier lost sufficient support through a successful motion of no confidence at any time, he would tender his resignation to the Governor, which would result in another member being elected and sworn in by the Governor as the next Premier.

== Results ==
=== House of Assembly ===
House of Assembly (BV) – Turnout N/A (Non-CV)
Party	Votes			Seats	
Party	Votes	%	Swing (pp)	Seats	Change
Independent	18,070	100.0	±0.0	36	0
Total	18,070	100.0	–	36	
Registered voters	23,982	–	–		
Source: ECSA

== See also ==
- Members of the South Australian House of Assembly, 1868–1870
