= Carrington Smedley =

Australian politician

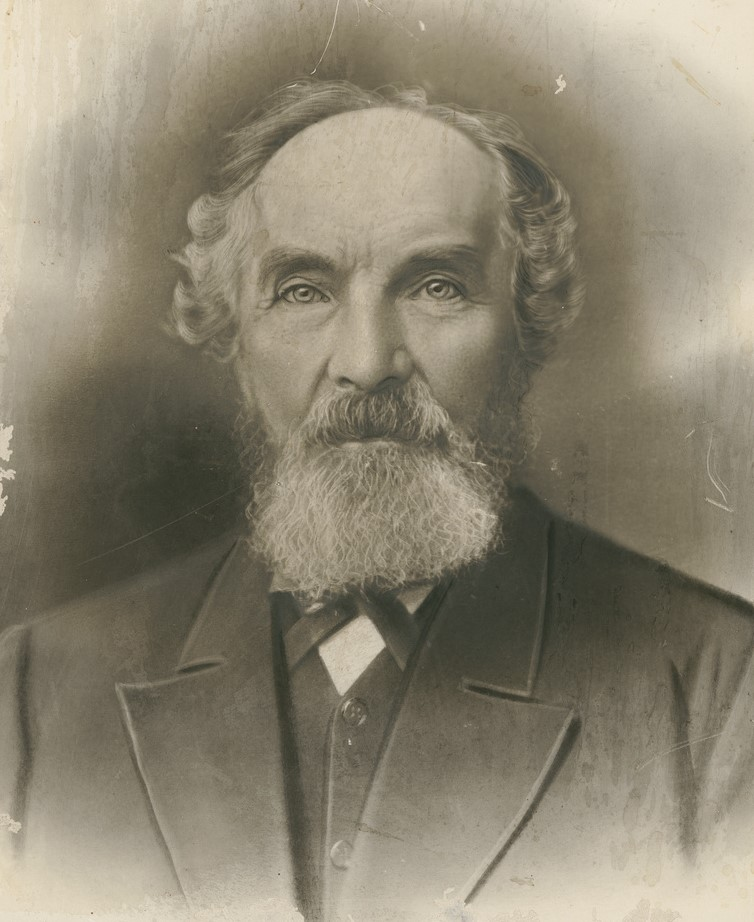
- Born: 8 October 1808; Nottinghamshire, England
- Died: 19 May 1895 (aged 86); Semaphore, South Australia
- Occupations: draper, politician
- Spouse(s): Harriet Garrett (1812 – 1870), Mary Ann Peacock formerly Evans nee Cheetham (1821 – 1908)
- Children: Sarah Seager Smedley (1842 – 1860), Harriet Garrett Cudmore (1845 –1879), Anne Emma Palmer (1849 – 1937), Maria Peacock Henderson (1851 – ), Samuel Smedley (1855 – )
- Parent(s): Joseph Smedley and Sarah nee Carrington
- Relatives: Daniel Henry Cudmore (son-in-law), Henry Cheetham (father-in-law)

member for Light South Australian House of Assembly with J. T. Bagot
- In office February 1857 to December 1857

Carrington Smedley (8 October 1808 – 19 May 1895) was a politician in the colony of South Australia.

== History ==
Carrington was born in Nottinghamshire and served an apprenticeship in the drapery business.

Smedley and his wife and their two daughters emigrated to South Australia on the ship Thomas Lowry, arriving 6 December 1848. (The trip was by all accounts an unpleasant experience for the passengers.) He set up in business in Kapunda and invested heavily in land there.

He was elected to the South Australian House of Assembly seat of Light as an associate of J. T. Bagot, and sat from February 1857 to December 1857, when he sold his business to William Lewis and resigned his seat (Lewis was to hold the same seat some ten years later) to visit England. They returned in 1861.

He was appointed Justice of the Peace in October 1857.

== Family ==
His wife Harriet Smedley (née Garrett) originally of Alverstoke, England, died at their residence in Glen Osmond on 28 June 1870. Their children included:

- Sarah Seager Smedley (1842 – 1860)
- Harriet Garrett Smedley (1845 – 16 March 1879) married Daniel Henry Cudmore on 20 February 1872.
- Anne Emma Smedley ( – 13 October 1937) married Alfred Palmer of Kapunda on 27 September 1870
- Maria P. "Lilla" Smedley married George M. Henderson of Greenock on 14 June 1877
- only son Samuel Smedley married Alice C. Saunders of Clare on 12 March 1884 and lived at Brougham Place. Their son Arthur Carrington Smedley (19 November 1886 – 19 August 1915) lost a leg at Gallipoli, and reportedly died, but whose papers were lost so for a time was posted as "missing".

On 4 March 1875 he married again, to Mary Ann Peacock (26 February 1821 – 27 April 1908), the widow of William Peacock. Their home for around nine years was the Peacock mansion "Palm House" in Hackney, later part of St. Peter's College. In 1883 they moved to "Torrens Villa", Ellen Street, Semaphore, where he died.
