= William Mattinson =

Australian politician (1836–1911)

William Edward Mattinson (1 April 1836 – 11 August 1911) was a politician in the colony of South Australia.

He was born in London, and emigrated with his parents William Edward Mattinson and his wife Mary to South Australia, arriving in April 1837 and settling on Kangaroo Island. They moved to Port Lincoln around 1840, then settled in Port Adelaide in 1843.

William worked as a builder and contractor in the Port Adelaide area.

He was a member for Port Adelaide in the South Australian House of Assembly from April 1881 to April 1890. His colleague for the first term was David Bower and George Hopkins for the second. He stood unsuccessfully for the seat in 1890 and again in 1896.

He was an active member of the Victoria Lodge of the Independent Order of Oddfellows, and Chairman of the Port Adelaide Football Club from 1902 to 1910, when failing health forced him to resign.

== Family ==
He married Cecilia Susannah Willington (c. 1838 – 28 August 1928) on 29 April 1856. Their children included:

- Edward Charles Mattinson (13 June 1858 – 10 May 1921) married Elizabeth Hannah Bishop, lived at Kilkenny
- Thomas William Mattinson (10 April 1860 – 18 March 1900)
- Alfred Walter Mattinson (3 August 1862 – 24 July 1903) married Hannah Edwards
- William Spencer Mattinson (18 November 1872 – 1928), lived at Worsley, Western Australia
- Annie Jane Mattinson (20 March 1868 – 17 January 1961) married Arthur Joseph Leaver
- Mary Amelia Mattinson (20 October 1877 – 27 November 1962) married Henry Robert Leaver
- Cecilia Charlotte Mattinson (29 September 1870 – 14 October 1931) married William Ernest Clements

They lived in Spring Street, Queenstown.

He died on 11 August 1911, at the age of 76. William, his wife Cecilia, their sons Thomas William and Alfred Walter are buried together at Cheltenham Cemetery.
