= John Hill (Australian businessman) =

South Australian businessman (1847–1926)

Henry John Hill (6 March 1847 – 18 September 1926) was a South Australian businessman. Hill owned a coach-horse business in the early days of South Australia. He was the father of Clem Hill, the noted cricketer.

== History ==
Hill was born at Walkerville, the eldest son of businessman and parliamentarian Henry Hill, he was educated at the Alberton school of the Presbyterian Rev. Mercer. Around 1858 he started work for his father in the goods department of Henry Hill & Co. which had a contract with the South Australian Railways. In 1866 the South Australian company Cobb & Co., an affiliate of the famous New South Wales stagecoach business, bought the business of William Rounsevell and John was put in charge. In 1873 Cobb & Co. sold this business to a company John Hill & Co., whose owners were Hill, H. R. Fuller and George Mills. Business expanded and in 1882 the firm was restructured as John Hill & Co., Limited. At various times more than 1,000 horses were in work at once across the State, but they were always just a few years ahead of the establishment of railways on the most profitable routes. The Mount Pleasant and Willunga coaches were the last of the familiar horse-drawn vehicles to be seen on the roads.

In April 1888 Hill was appointed a member of the Board of Railways Commissioners, a position which he held for seven years at a salary of £1,009 a year. His colleagues were J. H. Smith (a railway expert from England, who was chairman of the board) and A. S. Neill. He then returned to manage Hill & Co. In October 1911 Hill and erstwhile competitor Henry Graves founded Hill, Graves & Co., with a massive stone bulk store at Port Adelaide bounded by Timpson, Divett and Mempes Streets (later occupied by R. Mitchell & Co.) extensive stables in Pirie and Grenfell Streets (the largest in Australia) and offices on North Terrace and in Gouger and George Streets, Adelaide. The company ceased trading at the end of 1920, but with business rationalised and transferred to H. Graves & Company.

Hill was a prominent member of the Pirie Street Methodist Church for more than 60 years, and held numerous offices in connection with the church and Sunday school. and served on the General Wesleyan Conference in 1884, 1890 and 1894.

He was at one time a member of the Board of Trustees of the Savings Bank of South Australia.

He took a keen interest in sports, particularly cricket, and (with 102 not out for North Adelaide against the Kent Club on 30 January 1878) scored the first century on the Adelaide Oval. He was a member of the Adelaide Oval Bowls Club for many years.

Hill was chairman of the finance committee and a member of the horse committee of the Royal Agricultural and Horticultural Society for more than 30 years and President in 1905 and 1908, and he was made a life member a few months before he died at his home in Stanley Street, North Adelaide.

== Family ==
Henry John Hill married Rebecca Eliza Saunders (ca. 1847 – 25 February 1921) on 9 October 1867. They had eight sons and eight daughters, including:

- Peter Hill (East Adelaide)
- Arthur Hill (Plympton)
- Frank Hill (East Adelaide)
- Clement (Millswood), the famous cricketer
- Roy Hill (Eastwood) was also a fine batsman; the first to score a century at Norwood Oval.
- Stanley Hill (London)
- Mrs W. G. Smith (Angaston)
- Mrs. W. G. Kither (Sydney)
- Mrs. A. H. Goode (Unley Park)
- Mrs. A. R. Watson (Walkerville)
- Gwen Adela Hill married Lionel Watson Hack, son of Charles Hack, on 16 March 1916
- Lily Hill (North Adelaide)
- May Hill (North Adelaide).

All 16 children are as follows (not including their married names):

- Percy HILL (1868–1950)
- Ida HILL (1869–1954)
- Arthur HILL (1871–1936)
- Lilian HILL (1872–1970)
- Annie May HILL (1874–1940)
- Frank HILL (1875–1943)
- Clement HILL (1877–1945)
- Henry John HILL Jnr (1878–1906)
- Gertrude HILL (1879–1953)
- Leonard HILL (1881–1896)
- Marianne HILL (1882–1960)
- Leslie Roy HILL (1884–1952)
- Stanley HILL (1885–1970)
- Dorothea HILL (1887–1896)
- Marjorie HILL (1889–1976)
- Adela Gwen HILL (1891–1970)
