= George Pearce (South Australian politician) =

Australian politician (1826–1908)

Member of the South Australian House of Assembly for East Torrens
- In office May 1868 – March 1870 Serving with Daniel Fisher
- Preceded by: Randolph Isham Stow
- Succeeded by: Henry Hay Mildred

Personal details
- Born: 1 August 1826 Cornwall, England
- Died: 9 June 1908 (aged 81) Port Elliot, South Australia
- Spouse: Mary Ann Pearce (m. 1850)
- Occupation: Sheep farmer

George Pearce (1 August 1826 – 9 June 1908) was a sheep farmer and politician in the British colony of South Australia.

George Pearce was aged 21 when he emigrated in 1848 from Cornwall to South Australia on the Samuel Boddington, with several other members of his family. He was 23 when he married Mary Ann Pearce at Blakiston in 1850.

He first lived in Burra but in 1852 he joined the rush to the Victorian gold diggings. After a year or two he returned to Adelaide, and in 1855 started sheep farming at Point Sturt. He also ran farms at Crystal Brook and Calca.

He lived at Port Elliot for his last 14 or 15 years, where he was an active member of the Church of Christ.

He was elected to the South Australian House of Assembly seat of East Torrens and served from May 1868 to March 1870.

== Family ==
Henry Pearce (1800–1889) and his two sons George and William (1837–1909) of Altarnun, Cornwall, emigrated from England on the Samuel Boddington to South Australia. They arrived in 1849, and settled at The Burra.

James Pearce, another brother, arrived in 1848 with his wife and large family.

William Pearce arrived in South Australia with his brother George and their father Henry, lived at Burra until the Victorian gold rush, when they tried their luck for a year or so. William returned to Adelaide and began working as a blacksmith, then settled at Point Sturt, where he founded Poldea Station. He was an active member of the Church of Christ, and for many years the Sunday school superintendent. He was also Chairman of the District Council, and he took a deep interest in mechanical inventions and scientific discoveries. He bought up adjacent properties, and built a butter factory, worked first by steam and later by an oil engine. Around 1904 he purchased Kindaruar Estate for his two sons.

A third brother, James Pearce (1832–1919), arrived in the Ascendant in 1851, and worked as a blacksmith at Mount Barker, Red Hill and Alma. He died at his residence, Portrush Road, Glen Osmond.

James Pearce was father of Western Australian Senator George Pearce, Minister of Defence in three cabinets between 1908 and 1921.

== Family ==
Henry Pearce (c. 1800 – 20 August 1889) had three sons in South Australia. They were closely associated with the Shipway family, also from Cornwall: John Shipway, his wife Catherine, née Innes (c. 1814 – 14 December 1900), and their children Thomas, Edward Innes, Esther, and Mary Ann (1849– ), who arrived on the Cheapside in October 1849. Children of Henry Pearce included:

- George Pearce (1 August 1826 – 9 June 1908) married Mary Ann (c. 1820 – 10 February 1908); they lived at Port Elliot.

- William James Pearce ( – 27 May 1932) married Caroline
- George Pearce
- Henry Pearce

- James Pearce (22 November 1832 – 17 April 1919) married Jane Foster (20 January 1836 – 14 September 1880).

- Henry Pearce (c. September 1864 – 26 January 1948) of Milang
- Charles J. Pearce (c. 1868 – February 1940) of Horsham, Victoria was married to Alice E. Pearce ( – 20 July 1946).
- William Tillidge Pearce (c. 1869 – 1 August 1939) married Clara Gertrude Williams (c. 1869 – 23 March 1935) on 20 July 1893, lived at Alberton.
- Sir George Foster Pearce KCVO (14 January 1870 – 24 June 1952) member of Australian Senate and Minister for Defence.
- Edward Benjamin Pearce (1878–1962)
- Alfred Pearce ( – ) of Western Australia
- Frederick Gibbs Pearce (26 July 1879 – 1967) of Western Australia
- Emmeline Jane Pearce ( – ) married Herbert James "Bert" Jelly (c. 1870 – 22 November 1947) on 1 September 1894, lived at Sandwell (now Birkenhead)
- another daughter married Charles Norman "Charlie" Hatwell (17 October 1867 – 5 July 1947) of Mount Gambier then Wagga, brother of racehorse owner/trainers Ernest J. Hatwell and Percy J. Hatwell.

- William Pearce (1837 – 4 July 1909) owner of "Poldea" Estate, Point Sturt married Esther Shipway (c. 1846 – 11 February 1927) of Currency Creek on 29 November 1866 (newspaper notices have her as eldest daughter of Henry Pearce).

- Arthur William Pearce (24 July 1869 – 8 February 1934) married Jane Elizabeth "Jean" Verco (25 February 1872 – 30 April 1910) on 31 March 1909; home "Nura Nukie" ("Nura Mukie"?), Point Sturt. She died in childbirth.

- Jean Verco Pearce (30 April 1910 – ) married Terence Edward Griffin on 1 February 1941.

- Emily Catharine "Em" "Emmie" Pearce (c. 1871 – 15 December 1910)
- Bessie Elizabeth Pearce (17 September 1873 – 15 May 1896)
- John Edward "Jack" Pearce (1875 – 1957) married Linda Mary Vickery (1875 – 4 December 1945), lived at "Kindaruar".

- Elder daughter Doris Pearce (1900-1977) married Lionel Bowden (1901-1993) on 29 December 1928
- Reginald J. Pearce married Nancy N. Borrett on 10 June 1936

- Mary Edith Pearce (c. 1878 – 12 June 1953)
- (Sarah) Innes Pearce (1880–1978) married William Sinclair Yelland (1880–1960) on 15 March 1911, lived at "Thamburtwa", Point Sturt.
- Elsie Adeline Pearce (c. 1882 – ) married Donald James Turvey (c. 1882 – ) on 12 August 1914, lived at Milang.

- Eliza Pearce married Sidney Cook on 21 September 1865, lived at Finniss Point.
