= Henry Hay Mildred =

Australian politician (1839–1920)

- Born: 17 August 1839; North Adelaide, South Australia
- Died: 25 December 1920 (aged 81); Wayville, South Australia
- Education: St Peter's College, Adelaide
- Occupation: Lawyer
- Spouse: Louisa Rachel Montgomery (1842 – 1908)
- Parent(s): Henry Richard Mildred and Elizabeth Sarah Mildred (nee Bowyer)

Member for East Torrens in the South Australian House of Assembly
- In office March 1870 – December 1871

Henry Hay Mildred (17 August 1839 – 25 December 1920) was a lawyer and politician in the colony and State of South Australia.

== History ==
Henry was born in Strangways Terrace, North Adelaide, just two years after the arrival in South Australia of his parents Elizabeth and Henry Mildred in the South Australian. He was educated at Miss Hillier's School on South Terrace and from the age of nine at St. Peter's College, which was then conducted in rooms at the rear of Trinity Church. On leaving school he was employed at the law firm of Richman and Wigley in Hindley Street, at that time the centre of business activity in the city. Later he joined the firm of Belt, Cullen & Wigley, and was articled to W. C. Belt, a barrister of the Inner Temple, London. He was called to the South Australian Bar on 22 March 1862. During his legal career Mildred was associated with J. J. Beare, and later with a nephew, C. Herbert. He retired around 1912

He represented House of Assembly seat of East Torrens from March 1870 to December 1871.

He later lived with his daughter, Mrs. Robert Russell, at Young street, Wayville West.

== Family ==
Mildred married Louisa Rachel Montgomery (2 July 1842 Hurtle Vale, South Australia – 16 April 1908), a daughter of Dr. Robert Montgomery (c. 1809 – 1 March 1866) and Anne (née Atkinson) of Happy Valley and Glenelg, on 29 July 1863 at the home of Robert Montgomery, Happy Valley. Their children included:

- Elizabeth Gertrude Clarissa Mildred (2 May 1864 – 20 April 1929) married Arthur John Kirkham Brierly Longbottom (c. 1864 – 7 June 1936) of Willunga on 25 February 1893
- Katherine Margaret Bowyer Mildred (27 August 1867 – 24 January 1948) married Robert Russell (c. 1864 – 17 October 1917), Young Street, Wayville on 23 April 1896
- Rachel Montgomery Mildred (7 February 1866 – 12 January 1958) (known as Louisa Rachel Wilson) married David Abraham "Arthur" Harrington, date unknown.
- Lloyd Herbert Montgomery Mildred (26 March 1871 – 24 July 1945) married Frances Jane "Fannie" Scholefield (c. 1881 – 14 July 1902) on 30 December 1899. He married again, on 24 January 1905, to Caroline Opie McLauchlan (c. 1885 – 1955)
- (Henry) Guy Mildred (13 March 1874 – 24 May 1951) married Elsie Jane Shearer (c. 1880 – 4 April 1950) daughter of John Shearer on 3 May 1900. He was Assistant Superintendent of Cemeteries, later in business as an undertaker.
- Horace Randolph Mildred (10 September 1875 – 17 November 1950) married Priscilla Lean "Scilla" Barnet (c. 1877 – 24 May 1935) on 30 July 1902
- Henry Hay Mildred (29 July 1877 Campbelltown, South Australia – ) married his cousin Rebecca Wilson Montgomery (3 September 1873 Harrogate, South Australia – ) daughter of Richard Atkinson Montgomery and Susannah Montgomery, née Graham, on 9 January 1900 at the home of Richard Atkinson Montgomery, Dowlingville, South Australia.
