= David Bower (politician) =

Australian politician

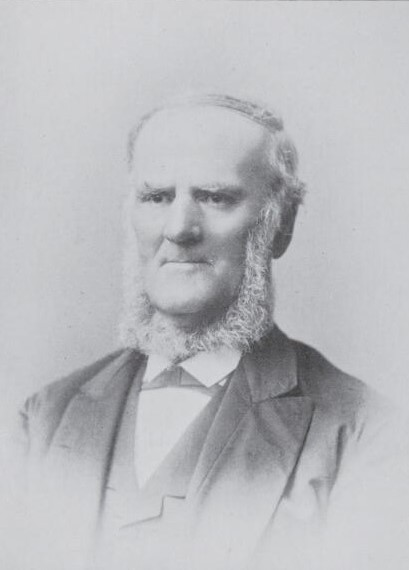

Mayor of Port Adelaide
- In office 1877–1878

Member of the South Australian House of Assembly for Port Adelaide
- In office 1865–1870, 1875–1887

Personal details
- Born: 11 April 1819
- Died: 6 July 1898 (aged 79)

David Bower (11 April 1819 – 6 July 1898) was a South Australian colonial merchant, politician and Commissioner of Public Works.

Bower was born at Upper Mill in Saddleworth, Yorkshire. In 1841 he emigrated to the Port Phillip District (now Victoria), and after a varied experience in New Zealand and New South Wales, finally settled in South Australia in 1847, where he established a successful business as a timber merchant at Port Adelaide.

On 1 March 1865 Bower was returned to the South Australian House of Assembly as member for Port Adelaide, a seat he held until 4 April 1870. In 1875 was again elected for Port Adelaide, which he represented until 18 March 1887. Bower was Commissioner of Public Works in the John Cox Bray Ministry from April to June 1884.

He was elected mayor of Port Adelaide in 1876, serving 1877–1878.

He died 6 July 1898.

Political offices
Preceded by James Ramsay	Commissioner of Public Works; 23 Apr 1884 – 16 Jun 1884	Succeeded by Thomas Playford II
South Australian House of Assembly
Preceded by Patrick Coglin	Member for Port Adelaide; 1865–1870; Served alongside: John Hart, Jacob Smith, Henry Hill	Succeeded by Henry Hughes
Preceded by Henry Hughes	Member for Port Adelaide; 1875–1881; Served alongside: William Quin, John Hart Jr, William Mattinson	Succeeded by George Hopkins
