= Thomas Stow =

Australian clergy (1801–1862)

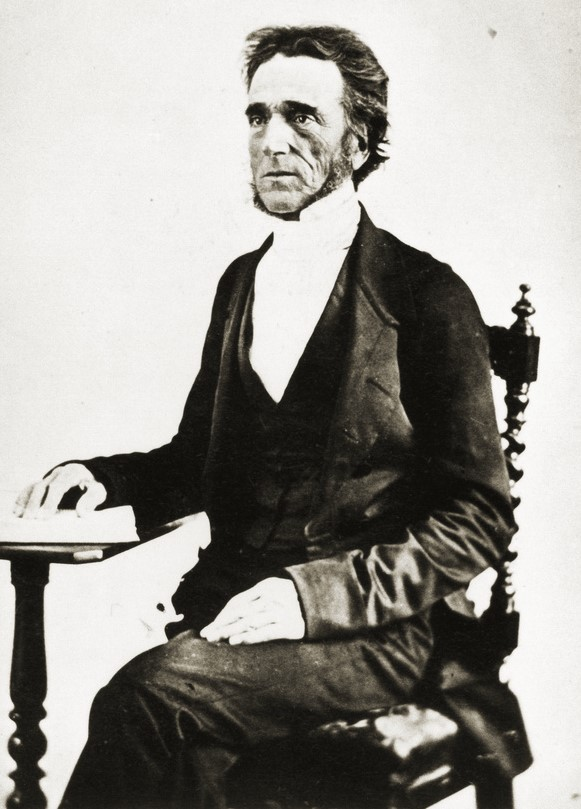

Thomas Quinton Stow (7 July 1801 – 19 July 1862), generally referred to as the Rev. T. Q. Stow, but also as Quinton Stow, was an Australian pioneer Congregational minister.

== Early life ==
From 1822 to 1825 Stow was minister at Framlingham, Suffolk; later at Buntingford, Hertfordshire, then was transferred to Halstead in Essex. In 1833 Stow published the Memoirs of R. Taylor, LL.D., followed by The Scope of Piety (1836). At Framlingham Stow married Elizabeth Eppes, described as a "handsome brunette . . . the rage of London society". She was a daughter of William Eppes of Bristol and his wife Elizabeth, née Randolph, descendant of an old Virginia family.

== Legacy ==
Stow was an outstanding preacher in early Adelaide, a good speaker who incorporated humour and satire. Stow helped form the character of the growing settlement of Adelaide, which was appreciated at the time. The Stow Memorial Church (now Pilgrim Uniting Church) in Adelaide was named for him. Stow Hall, built 1872 at 16 Flinders Street, has been a popular venue for amateur theatre productions.

He was married in England and brought his wife Elizabeth Randolph Stow, née Eppes, (c. 1797 in Newfoundland – 8 July 1867), who survived him, and four sons with him:

- Judge Randolph Isham Stow (1828–1878).
- Jefferson Pickman Stow (1830–1908)
- Augustine Stow (1833–1903)
- Wycliffe Stow (c. 1836–1897) was one of the two sons (with Augustine) able to be at his father's side when he died.
