= William Dale (politician) =

Australian politician (1827–1904)

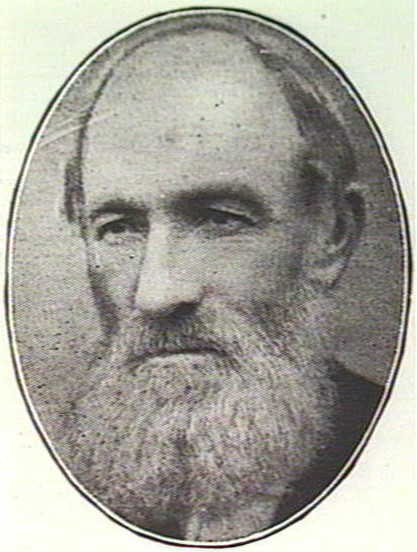

William Dale (1827 – 15 February 1904) was a carpenter, politician, and total abstinence activist in the young colony of South Australia.

He was a lay preacher and one of the founding trustees of the Primitive Methodist church at Redruth and a leading worker in the cause of total abstinence. He was a prominent Rechabite, a Tent at the Talisker Mines being named for him. He moved to North Adelaide sometime before 1865 He was secretary of the South Australian Total Abstinence Society.

He was elected to the House of Assembly seat of The Burra and Clare, with fellow teetotaler Cole as his associate, serving from March 1860 to March 1862, when he resigned, to be replaced by John Bentham Neales, and left for New Zealand. His home in Arney Street, Greymouth was washed away in the flood of 10 February 1872, and two of his sons were drowned: George (aged 9) and John (aged 6). He left New Zealand for Victoria, where he lived for many years but returned to South Australia around 1897,

He married Elizabeth Parkinson (c. 1831 – 9 May 1896); Their children included William (1856-1934), Joseph (6 June 1860 – 1909), George (1863-1872), Rosa (1865-1939), John (1866-1872), and Mary Jane (1868-1927).

He died in Melbourne on 15 February 1904.
