= James Umpherston =

Australian politician

James Umpherston (1812 – 28 October 1900) was a farmer and politician, a noted settler of Mount Gambier, South Australia.

Umpherston was born in Cambuslang, Lanarkshire, Scotland, and worked as a farmer until he emigrated to South Australia on the Ariadne, arriving in August 1839.

He worked for several years as a contractor to established farmers until he had saved enough to start farming for himself firstly at Brown Hill Creek near Mitcham Village, then at Smithfield on the Gawler Plains for over 12 years, where he prospered until he left in November 1859 when Mount Gambier opened up for settlement.

He next took up land at Attamurra, 4 miles (6.4 km) north-east of Mount Gambier, naming his property "Cadzow", later owned by John Kennedy. He sold up there and moved to the Myora Estate, 9 miles (14 km) east of Mount Gambier, which he sold to W. A. Crouch in 1875. Finally he moved to "The Caves", where he remained, turning it into a showpiece and model farm. "The Caves" was later owned by Joseph Botterill MLC.

He was elected to the South Australian House of Assembly seat of Victoria in December 1866 at the by-election brought about by the resignation of Adam Lindsay Gordon, with John Riddoch of Yallum as colleague, and retired in May 1868, succeeded by Henry Kent Hughes.

He died after a brief illness. He was twice married: to Janet Arneil (c. 1811 – 10 January 1877). He married again, to Margaret Ferguson (c. 1842 – 18 March 1919) on 8 March 1878; he had no children. He had three brothers and a sister who immigrated to South Australia between 1849 and 1870:

- John Umpherston (c. 1816 – 21 February 1904) of Mount Gambier married Helen Wotherspoon (c. 1813 – 25 November 1898) on 20 March 1842 at Glasgow Barony Church. His family was the last to immigrate in January 1870 on the Loch Earn.
- Archibald Umpherston (17 January 1819 – 17 March 1896) of Wild Horse Plains married Jane Martin (11 April 1820 – 12 March 1863) on 6 November 1840 at Cambuslang Parish Church. His family immigrated on the Fatima in June 1850.
- Ann Umpherston (20 March 1826 – 29 December 1882) married William Innes of Onetree Hill on 20 April 1854. Their children founded the Mil Lel Cheese and Butter Company.
- William Umpherston (24 February 1830 – 13 January 1915) of Yahl, South Australia married Sarah Campbell on 21 July 1857. He immigrated with his sister Ann Umpherston on the Macedon in 1849.

== Other interests ==
He was appointed Justice of the Peace at Mount Gambier in 1861, He was a member of the Agricultural and Horticultural Society of Adelaide from its earliest days, and kept up his membership of it to the last, and when he moved to the South-East he helped establish a local Agricultural, Pastoral and Horticultural Society, and was its first President. He helped found the Mount Gambier District Council, and when it was divided in 1865 became Chairman of the Gambier East Council, and served in that position for 12 years. He helped establish the Mount Gambier Institute and was a founder of the local Caledonian Society, and its Chief for two years. He was a founding member of the local Agricultural Bureau, and its first President. He was prominent among the founders of the Mount Gambier Presbyterian Church and was one of its elders and most regular worshippers. He was a Justice of the Peace, and a member of the Licensing Bench.
