= William Lewis (Australian politician) =

Australian politician

William Lewis JP (23 April 1818 – 12 April 1895) was a businessman and politician in South Australia.

== History ==
Lewis was born in Tredegar, Wales, the only surviving son of Rev. Lewis, and at age 14 was forced by the death of his father to abandon studies for the ministry and find employment as a lawyer's clerk, as a stationer in London, then as a bailiff for his cousin Sep. Lewis in Wales. In 1853 he emigrated to South Australia on the Iris, and soon found work with Hart & Co., then ran a store at Sydenham Road, Norwood. He moved to Kapunda in 1857 to manage Carrington Smedley's drapery store at the corner of Main and Hill Streets, which he subsequently purchased. He later sold the business to Andrew Thomson and retired to Allendale (now Allendale North), a few miles to the north.

Lewis was a longtime supporter, and treasurer, of the Kapunda and Light Agricultural Society, as well as chairman of the Kapunda School Board of Advice. He also acted as local registrar of births, deaths and marriages. He was an agent for the Australian Mutual Provident Life Assurance Society and the South Australian Fire Insurance Company. He was auditor for the Kapunda Corporation for six years. All these activities he had to relinquish with declining health, a year before he died.

Lewis was a foundation member of the Kapunda Congregational Church and superintendent of the Sunday school for many years, and president of the local branch of the British and Foreign Bible Society.

== Politics ==
Lewis was appointed to the inaugural Kapunda Council in 1865, retiring late the following year. He was member for Light in the South Australian House of Assembly from May 1868 to April 1870 (succeeding Smedley by around ten years), with Captain John Hart as his colleague. In 1888 he was a candidate for the North Eastern district in the Legislative Council, but was soundly defeated by Henry Ayers.

He died at his home in Allendale.

== Family ==
He married Elizabeth Hughes ( – 27 October 1881) around April 1839. Their children included:

- Kate Hannah Lewis (c. 1844 – 9 November 1872) married George Church on 1 July 1864, lived in Port Adelaide
- Elizabeth Angharad Lewis (c. 1841 – 6 June 1914) married John Murch Stacy (c. 1831 – 18 January 1906) on 18 April 1862, lived in Adelaide
- Lydia Ceinwen Lewis (1843 – 20 September 1911) married Dr Ernst Heinrich Geyer (c. 1825 – 8 June 1876) on 26 June 1867, lived in Moonta
- Mary Lewis (1847 – ) married August C. Geyer ( – ) on 23 August 1877, lived in Wilcannia
- Agnes Rachel Lewis (1849 – 12 July 1934) married John Church (c. 1845 – 26 September 1934) on 19 September 1872, lived in Fremantle
- Helen Lewis (c. 1851 – )
- W. Walter Lewis (c. 1854 – 19 October 1937) married Euphemia "Phim" Hillam (c. 1862 – 23 June 1948) on 28 January 1891, lived at Baroota (40 km north of Port Pirie)
- Florence Eos Lewis (c. 1861 – 4 July 1919) married Rev. Alfred George Fry (c. 1847 – 24 September 1926) on 12 November 1889, lived at Kapunda
