= Alexander McCulloch (politician) =

Australian politician

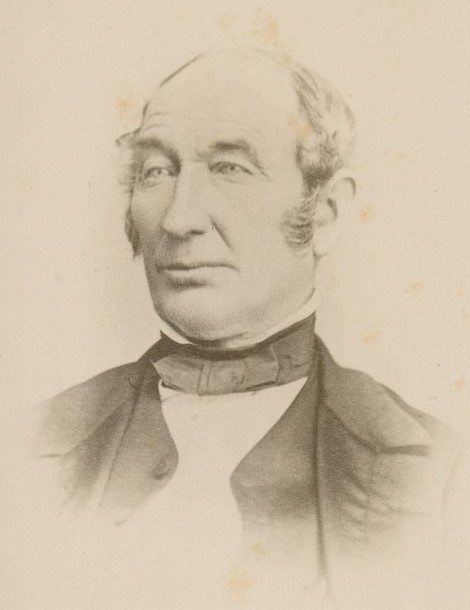

Alexander McCulloch (c. 1809 - 15 October 1890) was an Australian politician who represented the South Australian House of Assembly seat of The Burra from 1866 to 1868.

McCulloch arrived in the Colony of South Australia in the Oriana in 1836. He later owned Princess Royal and Yongala stations.
