= 1865 South Australian colonial election =

- 1–13 March 1865

All 36 seats in the South Australian House of Assembly 8 (of the 18) seats in the South Australian Legislative Council
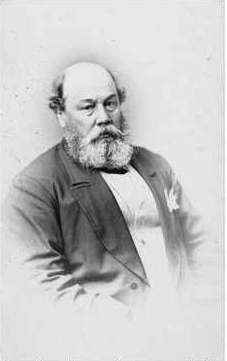

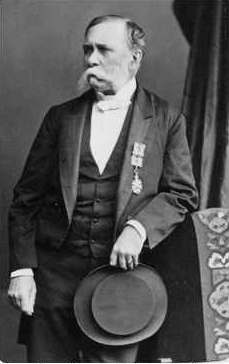
Leader	Arthur Blyth	Francis Dutton
Leader's seat	Gumeracha	Light
- Results by electoral district for the House of Assembly
Premier before election
Arthur Blyth
Elected Premier
Francis Dutton

The 1865 South Australian colonial election was held between 1 and 13 March 1865 to elect members to the 4th Parliament of South Australia. All 36 seats in the House of Assembly (the lower house, whose members were elected at the 1862 election), and eight of the 18 seats in the Legislative Council (the upper house, which had two casual vacancies to be filled) were up for re-election.

The election used non-compulsory plurality block voting, in which electors voted for as many candidates as they wished. Members of the House of Assembly were elected to 18 multi-member districts consisting of two seats each. Members of the Legislative Council were elected in a single 18-member district. Suffrage extended to men (including Aboriginal men) over 21 years of age (who owned property worth at least £50, for the Legislative Council), unless they were "attainted or convicted of treason or felony".

No parties or solid groupings would be formed until after the 1890 election, which resulted in frequent changes of the Premier. If the incumbent Premier lost sufficient support through a successful motion of no confidence at any time, he would tender his resignation to the Governor, which would result in another member being elected and sworn in by the Governor as the next Premier.

== Results ==
=== House of Assembly ===
House of Assembly (BV) – Turnout N/A (Non-CV)
Party	Votes			Seats	
Party	Votes	%	Swing (pp)	Seats	Change
Independent	13,339	100.0	±0.0	36	0
Total	13,339	100.0	–	36	
Registered voters	14,256	–	–		
Source: ECSA

=== Legislative Council ===
Legislative Council (BV) – Turnout 30.0% (Non-CV)
Party	Votes			Seats	
Party	Votes	%	Swing (pp)	Seats	Change
Independent	27,818	100.0	±0.0	18	0
Total	27,818	100.0	–	18	
Informal votes	188	4.7	–2.6		
Turnout	3,992	30.0	+8.7		
Registered voters	13,291	–	–		
Source: ECSA

== See also ==
- Members of the South Australian House of Assembly, 1865–1868
- Members of the South Australian Legislative Council, 1865–1869
