= Jacob Smith (politician) =

Australian politician

Jacob William Smith (c. 1816 – 21 December 1891) was a ship's captain who served as Mayor and Member of Parliament for Port Adelaide in the colony of South Australia.

Captain Smith was born in England the son of a paymaster in the Royal Navy, and was trained for the sea. At the age of nineteen he found himself in command of a fine Indiaman when the captain died at sea. He subsequently commanded a number of ships of the Duncan Dunbar line, and earned a high reputation and made rapid progress through the ranks of the company.

He made, as captain of the David Malcolm, a splendid barque of 538 tons, three trips bringing migrants from London to Adelaide : in January 1847, March 1848, and April 1849. His next trips to the colony were in charge of the brig Flash, 159 tons, from Melbourne in December 1851, and February 1852, then he settled down to a life on shore. He bought a property at Woodville and started a shipping agency at Port Adelaide. For a time he owned the brig Lord Montgomery, then in August 1853 purchased the barque Templeton, which traded between Adelaide and Melbourne during the Ballarat gold rush.

In 1857 there were many American ships frequenting the Port, and he was appointed Consular Agent for the United States. From 1859 to 1863 and 1864 to 1866 he served as Mayor of Port Adelaide. During which time the Port Town Hall was commenced, and around the same time was appointed as Government nominee to the Marine Board, a position he retained for the rest of his life. He took a great interest in the Outer Harbor project, and was also a Managing Director of the South Australian Coal Company, and had an interest, along with Philip Levi & Co. in the Port Adelaide tug Goolwa.

He was member for Port Adelaide in the South Australian House of Assembly 29 June 1866 – 3 May 1868 with Captain Hart as a colleague. In those days Yorke Peninsula was part of the Electoral district of Port Adelaide, a fact which caused him some bemusement. In 1878 he contested the West Torrens seat, but was unsuccessful.

He had a wide range of experiences and adventures in life. He was said to be a splendid leader, but a poor follower, and at the Marine Board ensured his dissenting voice was recorded when any matter aroused his opposition. He was one of the race of sailors who believed the age of steam was a passing phase and that we would go back to sailing vessels again. He was bitter at losing out when the Consular Agency was upgraded and C. A. Murphy was appointed Consul.

== Family ==
Captain Smith married Marianne Barber (died 17 July 1877) in England. Their family included a daughter born on 3 March 1871.

Marianne had two nieces surnamed Barber in Adelaide; they married brothers surnamed Wigg.
