= Alexander Murray (manufacturer) =

Australian politician

Alexander Murray J.P. (25 December 1803 – 10 April 1880) with his son, also named Alexander, founded Murray & Son, biscuit and jam manufacturers of Coromandel Valley in the early days of the colony of South Australia. He served for a short term in the South Australian parliament.

== History ==
Alex, who was born in Glasgow, Scotland, left Britain with his wife and four-year-old son Alexander Jr. on the India for South Australia and arrived on 4 January 1840. They initially settled at Morphett Vale and began farming there.

He had skills as a painter. In 1845 he took an exhibition, "South Australia As It Is", to Scotland.

He moved to Coromandel Valley where he built a home, "Craiglee." In 1857 he built a factory to manufacture biscuits, the first in South Australia, and ten years later was producing around 165,000 pounds (75,000 kg) of biscuits annually. He started making "Adelaide" jams sometime before 1869 and by 1876 was producing 500 tons annually.

== Politics ==
He was a member of the South Australian House of Assembly for the seat of Sturt from August 1867, when he filled a vacancy created by the death of Joseph Peacock to March 1868.

He died at his home aged 76 years and 6 months.

His son Alexander Murray (ca.1836–1898), who was involved in the factory almost from its inception, represented Coromandel ward on the Mitcham District Council from 1881, and its Chairman from 1889, and it was while returning from a council meeting that he was dragged to the ground by his horse and died two days later, on 15 December 1898.

Alex Murray & Son had only recently been accepted into the Chamber of Manufactures, but its financial position was not sound: after Alexander's death creditors were paid 10½d. in the £ (around 4.4%). and the derelict factory fell into decay.

== Family of Alexander Murray ==
His sister Elizabeth married Rev. Samuel Gill (his second marriage)

He was married to Jean (ca.1802 – 9 August 1880)

- son Alexander Murray (ca.1835 – 15 December 1898) married Elizabeth Cumming (ca.1835 – 2 August 1926), daughter of Peter Cumming of Craigburn, in 1862; they lived at "Craiglee", Coromandel Valley; he was father's partner in Alex. Murray & Son.

- Albany Murray (11 February 1865 – 7 November 1938) married Beatrice May Fiveash (died 10 July 1950) on 17 August 1898; lived Fashoda Street, Hyde Park then Brandreth Street, Tusmore. He worked for D. & J. Fowler, then worked for his father until 1902, was involved in biscuit making in New Zealand, then returned to South Australia to help run the factory of W. Menz & Co.
- A. Ronald Murray (27 March 1868 – 11 December 1941) of Adelaide
- James Gordon Murray (19 December 1875 – ) married Lilla Murray Adams on 14 June 1905, lived at Kalgoorlie.
- Elizabeth Helen "Nellie" Murray married Lachlan McTaggart on 15 January 1896

- youngest son Peter Albany Murray (ca.1839 – 17 August 1864)

== See also ==
Other Australian biscuit manufacturers:

- Cecil Augustus Motteram
- William Arnott
