= Henry Mildred =

Australian politician (1795–1877)

Henry Richard Mildred
- Born: 9 March 1795; Portsea, Hampshire, England
- Died: 22 March 1877 (aged 82); Port Adelaide, South Australia
- Spouse: Elizabeth Sarah Bowyer
- Children: Clarissa Martha Margaret Mildred (1821–1870), Hiram Telemachus Mildred (1823–1892), Urania Harriet Mildred (1824–1896), William Henry Mildred (1837–1838), Henry Hay Mildred (1839 – 1920)

member for Noarlunga in the South Australian House of Assembly
- In office 1857–1860

member for East Torrens in the South Australian House of Assembly
- In office 1860–1865

South Australian Legislative Council
- In office 1866–1871

Henry Richard Mildred (9 March 1795 – 22 March 1877) was a politician in the early days of the Colony of South Australia.

== History ==
Mildred was born in Portsea, Hampshire, England. Trained as a shipbuilder, he was contracted by the South Australian Company on the South Australian with David McLaren, arriving at Kangaroo Island on 22 April 1837, to manage the purchase and loading of major machinery which was ultimately used for "Fletcher's Patent Slip", for the Company's flour mill, eventually installed on the Torrens where the Hackney Hotel is now, and for a sawmill which may have been used at Cox's Creek. Mildred was invited to get this equipment running but he demurred, and it lay idle for some time.

Shortly after arrival on Kangaroo Island, Mildred, T. H. Beare and William Giles imported a batch of Merino ewes from Van Diemens Land, some of the first brought into the colony, though stock losses on the unusually long trip aboard the Cygnet were considerable.

The land he selected, on Fourth Creek, and where he lived for the rest of his life, turned out to be quite valuable, and made his fortune.

== Politics ==
He served on the Adelaide Municipal Council from 1841 to 1843. He was one of the colonists who strenuously opposed bringing out boys from the Parkhurst prison. He contested the election for the Legislative Council seat of Burra without success, but in 1850 was appointed to the Main Roads Commission and later that year appointed Justice of the Peace, and in 1858 made a Special Magistrate. In 1851 sat for, but failed to win, one of the first elected positions on the Legislative Council.

He represented Noarlunga in the first House of Assembly from 1857 to 1860, East Torrens from 1860 to 1865, and held a seat in the Legislative Council from 1866 to 1871.

He was appointed a member of the Central Road Board Committee in March 1858 and was appointed Special Magistrate in November 1858.

== Family ==
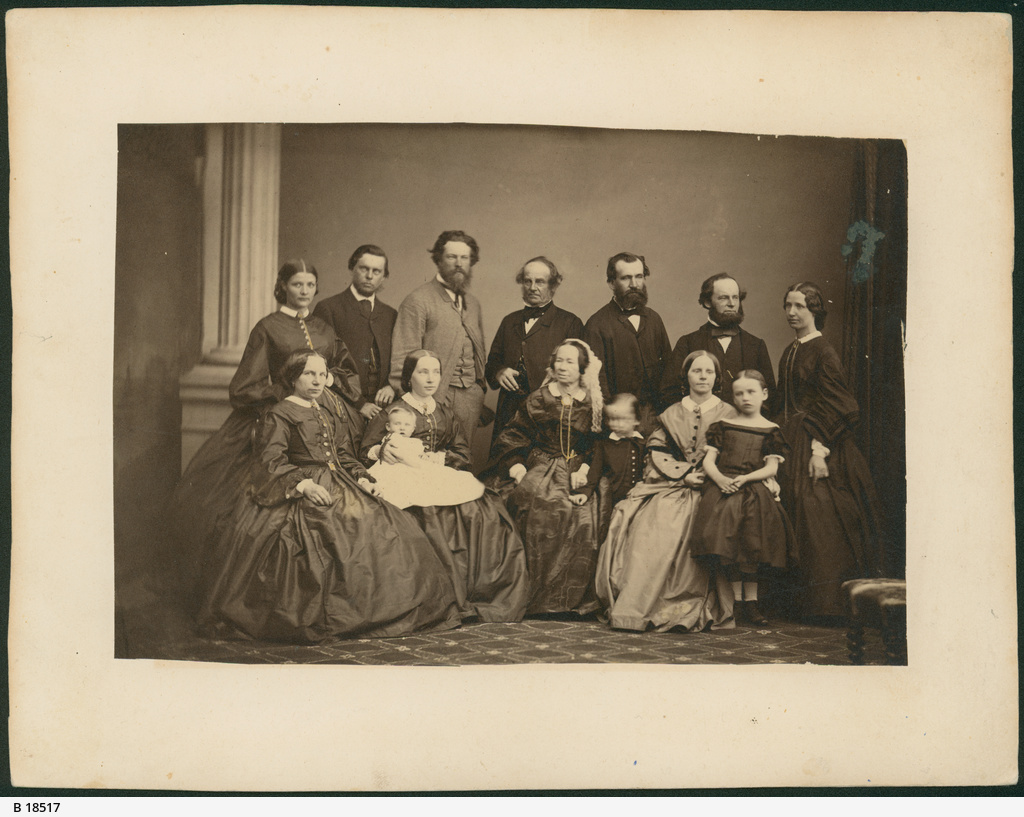
Four Generations of the Mildred Family; April 1864.

He was married to Elizabeth Sarah, née Bowyer, and had three sons and two daughters:

- Clarissa Martha Margaret Mildred (22 September 1821 – 19 November 1870) married Captain (of the John Pirie) Henry Hay ( – ) on 23 April 1840
- Hiram Telemachus Mildred (28 April 1823 – 21 August 1892) preceded his father to South Australia on the Rapid. He was elected to the City Council, was later Harbourmaster at Port Augusta.
- Urania Harriet Mildred (30 December 1824 – 30 August 1896) married John Varley S.M. (22 October 1830 – 9 June 1887) of Kapunda on 15 April 1854.
- William Henry Mildred (1837–1838)
- Henry Hay Mildred (17 August 1839 – 25 December 1920) represented East Torrens from March 1870 to December 1871.

He died at the home of Dr. Mortimer, Port Adelaide.

Henry's brother George Mildred (c. 1808 – 13 December 1875), arrived in South Australia in 1836 on William Light's ship Rapid with nephew Hiram and settled on Kangaroo Island.
