= George Cole (South Australian politician) =

Australian politician

George William Cole (15 January 1823 – 4 December 1893) was a politician in the colony of South Australia.

== History ==
Cole was born in Lindfield, Sussex, the eldest son of George Cole (2 May 1792 – 20 November 1853) and Sarah Cole, née Cooper (c. 1787–1837). George married a second time, to Mrs Jane Mitchell in 1838. George, Jane, and George's seven children arrived in South Australia on 9 July 1839 aboard Lysander

He was employed as City Valuator from around 1865.

He was, like his father, a confirmed teetotaler, active in the Bible Christian Missionary Society and the Total Abstinence Society and important in the founding of Rechabites in South Australia. He was a lay preacher for the Wesleyan Methodist Church in Adelaide.

He was a member of Parliament for the seats of Burra and Clare 1860–1862, with fellow teetotaler William Dale as his associate, and The Burra 1862–1866, when he resigned. He fought for abolition of liquor and closing of railways on Sundays. In the 1850s he lived next door to the Temperance Hall in Tynte Street, North Adelaide; later at Lymington Cottage, Melbourne Street, North Adelaide.

== Family ==
Cole arrived in South Australia with his father, stepmother and six siblings:

- Charlotte Ann Cole (26 January 1821 – 1 January 1863) married George Hiles
- Sarah Jane Cole (4 May 1825 – ) married Samuel May in 1852
- Thyrza Lucy Cole (17 August 1827 – 1881) married Thomas James Mitchell in 1845
- Tryphena Cole (29 January 1832 – 30 January 1890) married Henry Jessop in 1848
- Aaron Cole (1835 – 23 September 1917) married Mary Ann Barlow in 1855
- William George Cooper Cole (23 February 1837 – 5 December 1912) married Mary Elizabeth Fountain in 1857

He married Ann Elizabeth Mitchell (14 January 1824 – 9 October 1915) on 1 December 1845.

- Jessie Ann Cole (6 September 1845 – 11 October 1847 in Hobart)
- Jessie Gravely Cole (29 September 1847 – 14 November 1870) married Arthur Hamilton Scarfe (20 June 1885 – 16 December 1948) on 22 June 1870
- Annie Elizabeth Cole (29 April 1851 – 8 June 1878) married Rev. William Williams (c. 1850 – 6 July 1913)
- George Mitchell Cole (5 December 1854 – 21 February 1884) married Susan Ellen Chapman (16 July 1856 – 11 April 1942) on 11 August 1881.
- Rosa Jane Cole (2 September 1859 – 21 October 1942) married Hannibal Lyne on 29 September 1880
- Emma Tryphena Cole (25 October 1861 – 8 January 1926 in WA) married John LeCornu jnr (c. 1861 – 14 July 1948) on 12 December 1882
