= William Trimmer =

Australian politician (c.1822–1867)

William Henry Trimmer (c. 1822 – 22 December 1867) was a vigneron and politician in the early colony of South Australia.

Trimmer may have arrived in South Australia on the Guiana from London in March 1842.

In 1843 he leased farmland on the banks of the Sturt River. Between 1859 and 1861 he planted some 15 acres (6 ha) of grapes at his vineyard. The property, "Fairford" in the Adelaide suburb of Sturt on which he built a modest house and wine cellar. He purchased the property from the South Australian Company in 1862.

He was a Justice of the Peace and Chairman of the District Council of Brighton 1866–1867. He was a candidate for one of two seats of Noarlunga in the South Australian House of Assembly in 1865, and came a credible third in the contest (John Colton 348, John Carr 303, Trimmer 261), but votes cast at Happy Valley could not be included, as the returns had been signed by the Poll Clerk rather than the Returning Officer. This put Trimmer in second place, thus giving him a seat. His offer to waive any objections could not be accepted, so immediately on taking his seat on 9 March 1865 he resigned in favour of Carr.

His last months were made miserable by the effects of delirium tremens, and he killed himself by swallowing a large quantity of laudanum.

He left his property to his wife and to Edward Amand Wright, a friend of 20 years. It is likely that Trimmer's cellar building was designed by Edmund Wright, Edward's brother. The property was in 1876 sold to Henry Laffer, hence its colloquial name "Laffer's Triangle". Fairford House, together with its coach-house, gardens and remaining vineyards, is State Heritage listed, and now forms part of the Warriparinga Living Kaurna Cultural Centre.

== Other interests ==
He was a member of the Free Rifles Corps, a volunteer regiment, and elected Captain in 1860.

He was a breeder of thoroughbred horses and a member of the building committee for St. Mary's Anglican Church, which opened in September 1847.

== Family ==
Trimmer married Eliza Catherine Duthy (c. 1831 – 16 January 1883). Their children included:

- James Trimmer (1850 – 18 October 1880)
- William Trimmer (1851 – 10 August 1915) married Mary Anne Daly ( –1919) in 1899
- Edmund Trimmer (1852 – 8 April 1889) married Emily Frances Barnes
- Frederick Trimmer (28 May 1854 – 12 August 1913) married Lilian Mary Dalzell on 16 January 1883
- Leonard Mortimer Trimmer (5 August 1855 – 18 August 1898)
- Alexander Trimmer (24 December 1857 – ) married Alice Jane Cleminson
- Ernest Trimmer (3 August 1859 – 2 July 1930) married Eliza Haynes (24 August 1865 – 29 October 1953) on 10 October 1883, lived Tanunda then Price Crescent, Lower Mitcham
- Maud Trimmer (19 May 1863 – )
- Percival Trimmer (11 February 1866 – 15th May 1934) married Mary Ellen "Nellie" Haynes (c. 1866 – 30 January 1950) on 4 March 1890, lived at "Fairford" Tanunda, later Baliol Street, College Park.
