= Augustine Stow =

Australian politician (1833–1903)

Augustine Stow JP
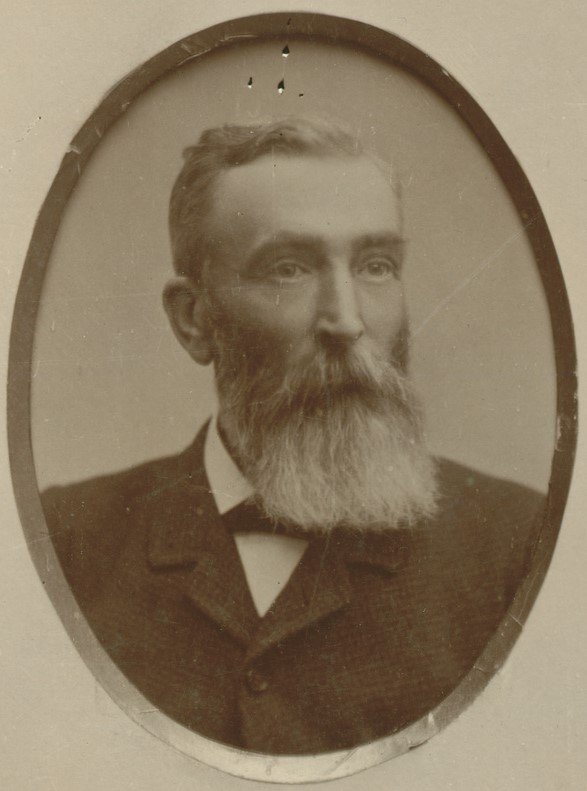

24th Chief Secretary of South Australia
- In office 12 May 1870 – 30 May 1870
- Premier: Henry Strangways
- Preceded by: John Bagot
- Succeeded by: William Milne

Personal details
- Born: 3 August 1833 Halstead, Essex, United Kingdom
- Died: 29 May 1903 (aged 69) Unley, South Australia
- Spouse: Elizabeth Augusta Frew (m. 1867)

Augustine Stow, J.P., (3 August 1833 – 29 May 1903) was a politician in colonial South Australia, member of the South Australian House of Assembly for West Torrens from November 1862 to 1864, and for Flinders from October 1866 to 1868.

Stow was born in Halstead, Essex, England, the son of the Rev. Thomas Quentin Stow and his wife Elizabeth, née Eppes; Augustine was the brother of Randolph Isham Stow and Jefferson Pickman Stow. The family arrived in South Australia in the Hartley in 1837. He married Elizabeth Augusta Frew on 10 September 1867. On 19 March 1869, Stow was elected to the South Australian Legislative Council (in the days when all members were voted in by the whole colony, "The Province"), resigning in September 1871. Stow was Chief Secretary in Henry Strangways' Ministry for 18 days in May 1870. In 1877 he entered the Government service, and in April 1884 was appointed Registrar of Probates, and Chief Clerk in the Supreme Court. He was also Commissioner of Inland Revenue without salary.

Stow was a member of the board of governors of the Art Gallery, Public Library and Museum. Stow died on 29 May 1903 at Unley, Adelaide, South Australia.

Parliament of South Australia
| Preceded by Randolph Stow | Member of Parliament for West Torrens; 1862 – 1865; Served alongside: Henry Strangways | Succeeded by John Pickering |
| Preceded by Alfred Watts | Member of Parliament for Flinders; 1866 – 1868; Served alongside: John Williams | Succeeded by Alfred Watts |
| Preceded by William Peacock; Charles Everard; Thomas Elder; Charles Bagot | Member of the South Australian Legislative Council; 1869 – 1871; Served alongside: Multiple Members | Succeeded by William Storrie; Philip Santo; Charles Everard; Thomas Elder |
Political offices
| Preceded by John Bagot | Chief Secretary of South Australia; 1870 | Succeeded by William Milne |
