= Henry Hill (politician) =

Australian freight contractor and politician

Henry Hill (c. 1826—28 June 1910) was a freight contractor and politician in South Australia.

In 1858 Hill, Henry Robert Fuller (1825—1905) and George Mills founded H. R. Fuller & Co. to manage freight carrying on the newly opened South Australian Railways.In 1862 Hill and Mills bought out Fuller's share, founding Henry Hill & Co., with John Vautin ( –1876) brought in as an additional director, and diversified into stagecoach passenger transport.

In 1866, after years of ruinous competition in the stagecoach business, they took a one-fourth share of a consortium with Ben Rounsevell and several others, named Cobb and Co and loosely affiliated with the New South Wales company of the same name. By 1871 the South Australian Cobb & Co. business was, on paper, under the sole ownership of Henry Hill, who sold the assets to John Hill & Co., a new company owned by his son John Hill, H. R. Fuller and George Mills. In 1911 John Hill & Co. merged with H. Graves & Co. as Graves, Hill & Co.

Around the same time Henry Hill joined in partnership with William Martin Letchford, George Mills, James Rofe and Charles Richard Darton as C. R. Darton & Co., railway carriers; this partnership was dissolved in June 1870 to become Hill, Mills & Co., with Hill as manager. This company was dissolved in June 1872 to become Letchford, Mills & Rofe, with Henry Hill as manager. In 1873 this company amalgamated with competitors Bradley, Treleaven & Co., to form The South Australian Carrying Company. In 1878 the South Australian Railways took over all rolling stock, abolished the hire truck system. The South Australian Carrying Company was dissolved, and its business was taken over by Rofe & Co., owned by James Rofe (c. 1822–1909) of Walkerville and Port Adelaide, and his son J. G. Rofe (1847–1897) of Woodville.

He was member for Port Adelaide in the South Australian House of Assembly May 1868 to April 1870.

He died at his residence, Newmarket Hotel, North Terrace.

== Family ==
Henry Hill (1826 – 28 June 1910) married Susanna Rofe (1828–1905) in 1846. Among their children were:

- (Henry) John Hill (6 March 1847 – 18 September 1926) married Rebecca Eliza Saunders (ca. 1847 – 25 February 1921) on 9 October 1867. Cricketer Clem Hill was a son.
- Henry Robert Hill married Emily Mary Gordon (c. 1864 – 30 October 1887) on 22 December 1883. He married again, to Edith Rowley on 24 February 1890
- youngest son Henry Joseph Hill married Adelaide Elizabeth Parker on 25 September 1888
