= Daniel Fisher (Australian politician) =

Australian politician

Daniel Fisher (11 November 1812 – 2 June 1884) was a grain merchant and politician in the young colony of South Australia.

== History ==
Daniel Fisher was born in Bradford, Wiltshire, son of James Fisher (1785–1837) and his wife Sarah Fisher (c. 1787– ), and was transported to Van Diemen's Land (Tasmania) aged 15, for what he was later to describe as "an unfortunate mistake" and "a boyish escapade, involving no moral offence" for which he was later exonerated and, on a petition from John Baker received a Royal Pardon. He married Harriet Brown in Hobart Town on 6 November 1837 (Rev. William Bedford officiating) and moved to South Australia aboard the Timbo, arriving at Port Adelaide in April 1846.

He set up in business as a cornfactor and seedsman (grain merchant) in Rundle Street. His brother Charles arrived in Adelaide in 1848, for a time working as a contractor then joined Daniel as "Fisher Brothers", (not to be confused with the earlier hardware firm of the same name run by the unrelated James Hurtle Fisher). Charles left the partnership in October 1856 and set up in Grenfell Street on his own account. Daniel joined the gold rush to Victoria, but returned to Adelaide without having made a fortune. Other members of his family joined him in South Australia. He was convicted of assault after repeatedly charging his brother-in-law George P. Harris (co-founder of Harris Scarfe) on horseback and making threatening gestures. In a letter to the Adelaide Times, D. Fisher stated that there was great provocation given.

=== Public life ===
He was prominent in the defence of John Stephens, editor of the South Australian Register. He served on the Adelaide City Council from 1852 to 1855 and retired from business in 1856. He visited England in 1861, and in 1865 contested the election for seat of East Torrens in the South Australian House of Assembly but was unsuccessful. Two years later one of the successful candidates, Neville Blyth, resigned on a point of honour, and Fisher won the resulting by-election and served from July 1867 to May 1870. His colleagues were Randolph Isham Stow, who resigned in May 1868 then George Pearce. He was elected Mayor of the Town of Kensington and Norwood in 1862.

=== Last years ===
About 1878 Fisher suffered a stroke, which left him paralysed, and withdrew totally from public life. In the last year he lost the use of his mental faculties. He died at his home Nile Street, Glenelg.

== Family ==
Daniel Fisher (11 November 1812 – 2 June 1884) married 6 November 1837 at Hobart Town, Tasmania to Harriet Brown. They left for South Australia on board the Timbo, arriving 4 April 1846. (No record has yet been found for Harriet after her arrival in South Australia.) Daniel met, in Tasmania, his (common-law) wife Lucretia Kelk (c. 1813 – 2 February 1848). Lucretia moved to Adelaide to be with him (speculation). He married Mary Reynolds (no record of a marriage found) (19 December 1829 – 5 May 1909) around 1850. His children included:

- Elizabeth Maria Kelk Fisher (2 February 1848 – 12 April 1937) married Frederick Malin (13 July 1844 – 16 July 1917) of Port Adelaide on 8 August 1866
- Alfred George Fisher (24 February 1852 – ) married Sarah Elizabeth Abbott (1858–) of Norwood on 30 April 1877
- Walter James Fisher (1 August 1856 – 8 September 1897) was convicted in 1880 of stealing a purse.
- Laura Jane Fisher (4 August 1858 –9 April 1929) She married George Albert Day on 15 September 1880
- Emily Fisher (6 March 1864 – 18 January 1915) married Adolf Louis Hauschildt (c. 1861 – 10 May 1895) on 25 January 1886. She married again, to Edward George Stephens on 12 September 1898
- William Hartley Fisher (20 August 1865 – 8 June 1944) married Ellen "Nell" Musgrave (1869 –11 June 1956) on 20 July 1909

He had a brother and two sisters in South Australia:

Charles Fisher J.P. (c. 1824 – 27 November 1902), grain merchant, married Julia Humphreys Phillips, sister of W. Herbert Phillipps on 22 April 1858, later lived at "Parkholme", Wakefield Street, Kent Town. (Spelling is correct — W.H.P. changed his surname.)

- Charles Hedley Phillipps "Hedley" Fisher (c. 1860 – 25 November 1938) married Helen Napier "Nellie" Birks (20 June 1869 – 27 January 1949), second daughter of Charles Birks, on 14 February 1898
- Frank Fisher
- Beatrice Fisher married Charles Westmacott, nephew of General Westmacott, on 10 September 1898
- Herbert Stanley Fisher married Mary Clavering "Thistle" Anderson, daughter of Col. George Anderson, once MP for Glasgow, on 16 December 1901
- Wanborough Fisher, a well-known singer, married Louie Grant of Laura on 14 March 1905.

Caroline Fisher ( – 27 March 1920 Sussex) married George Peter Harris (c. 1818 – 26 November 1873) on 14 November 1854 at the Wesleyan Chapel, North Adelaide. Harris, co-founder of Harris Scarfe, arrived in SA 10 February 1849 aboard Candahar. from Plymouth. They had 2 children, both born in South Australia:-

- Louisa Caroline Harris (30 August 1855 – 1 May 1895 Middlesex, England) She married 5 January 1887 (Blackheath, St. Michael & All Angels) Leonard Waterhouse. They had 3 children.
- George Stanley Harris (21 June 1860 – )

The family left South Australia on 14 January 1867; George Peter Harris died 26 November 1873 at "Castle House", Shooter's Hill, England.

Elizabeth Fisher (c. 1814 Wiltshire – 13 August 1892 Norwood) married 1843 (Wiltshire England) Alfred Pickford (c. 1820 – 16 April 1908). Elizabeth, Alfred and daughter Ellen arrived in South Australia in 1853 aboard the Marshal Bennett. His occupation was listed as "Carpenter". Alfred had a business in Rundle street, retired around 1870. They had one daughter:

- Ellen Pickford (1844 Wiltshire, England – 2 April 1907) married 30 September 1863 at the Wesleyan Chapel Pirie Street, Adelaide to Rev. Henry Thomas Burgess. They had 15 children; Ellen was buried in the West Terrace cemetery.

Brothers and sisters who remained in England include:

John Fisher (1809 Bradford On Avon – 1861 Bradford On Avon), married Ann Billett

Eliza Fisher (1815 Bradford On Avon – c. 1874)

James Fisher (1822 Bradford On Avon – c. 1893 Wiltshire), married Amelia Gerrish
