= Alfred Watts (South Australian politician) =

Australian politician

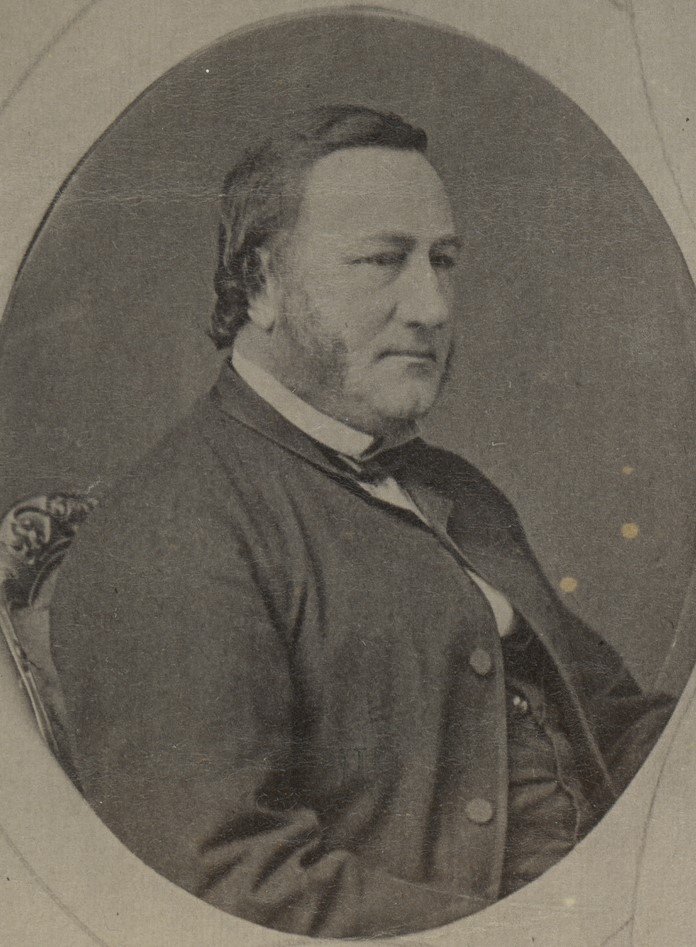

Alfred Watts (1815 – 29 November 1884) was a businessman and politician in the early days of the colony of South Australia.

Alfred Watts, cashier for the South Australian Company, left England on the Hartley, arriving in South Australia in October 1837, listed on the ship's manifest as Robert Adolphus Alfred Shaw Watts, but otherwise was only ever known as Alfred Watts.

Around 1857 he left the employ of the South Australian Company and formed a partnership with Philip Levi (1822–1898), which commenced as an import/export agency then in various forms continued for around 15 years, operating some very large pastoral properties.

He formed a partnership Watts & Wells with his nephew Percy Wells (1825–1909) as importers and exporters; they became interested in marine infrastructure; In 1869 they promoted ambitious plans for an Outer Harbour to allow the berthing of ships of deeper draught than possible in Port Adelaide, despite extensive (and expensive) dredging. It was proposed by a group of London speculators, who offered to finance it totally in exchange for monopoly use of the facility. The plan was supported by the newspapers but opposed by Port Adelaide business interests, and by the Legislative Council select committee which saw that it would be inimical to South Australia's long-term interests.

They tendered for construction of lighthouses and jetties, beginning with the Cape Jaffa lighthouse, as agents for Wells Brothers, eminent British engineers, whose principal was a brother of Percy Wells.

He was elected to the South Australian Legislative Council seat of Flinders and sat from October 1855 to February 1857 and then in the South Australian House of Assembly seat from November 1862 to September 1866 (when he resigned) and May 1868 to February 1875. He was appointed to several committees and commissions, where his financial expertise proved valuable, but with advancing years his intellect deteriorated and he no longer appeared in public. He died after a long illness and was buried in the grounds of Clayton Congregational Church, Kensington.

He succeeded Herbert Aylwin as honorary consul for Sweden–Norway in Adelaide from 13 December 1864 to 24 March 1876, succeeded by Edvard Phillipps Meredith.

== Personal ==
Alfred Watts married Jane Isabella "Minnie" Giles (1824 – 19 August 1894), second daughter of William Giles, manager of the South Australian Company, on 18 May 1842. Giles and his daughter were fellow passengers on the Hartley, as was Rev. T. Q. Stow, who performed the service. They lived at "Leabrook", then "Hazelwood". Jane was the author of several books. They had no children.
