= Electoral district of The Burra =

Former South Australian electoral district

Coordinates: 33°40′00″S 138°56′00″E

The Burra South Australia—House of Assembly
- State: South Australia
- Created: 1862
- Abolished: 1875
- Namesake: Burra, South Australia
- Demographic: Rural

The Burra was an electoral district of the House of Assembly in the Australian state of South Australia from 1862 to 1875.

The Burra was also the name of an electoral district of the unicameral South Australian Legislative Council from 1851 until its abolition in 1857, George Strickland Kingston being the member. It was created in 1862 after the Electoral district of The Burra and Clare was abolished.

In February 1875 The Burra was abolished and superseded by the Electoral district of Burra, Rowland Rees being one of the last members for the old district and one of the two new members for the new.

The town of Burra is currently located in the seat of Stuart.

== Members ==
Member	Party	Term	Member	Party	Term
John Neales		1862–1870	George Cole		1862–1866
John Neales		1862–1870	Alexander McCulloch		1866–1868
John Neales		1862–1870	James Boucaut		1868–1870
Charles Mann		1870–1875	John Hart		1870–1873
Charles Mann		1870–1875	Rowland Rees		1873–1875
