= Henry Robert Fuller =

Australian politician

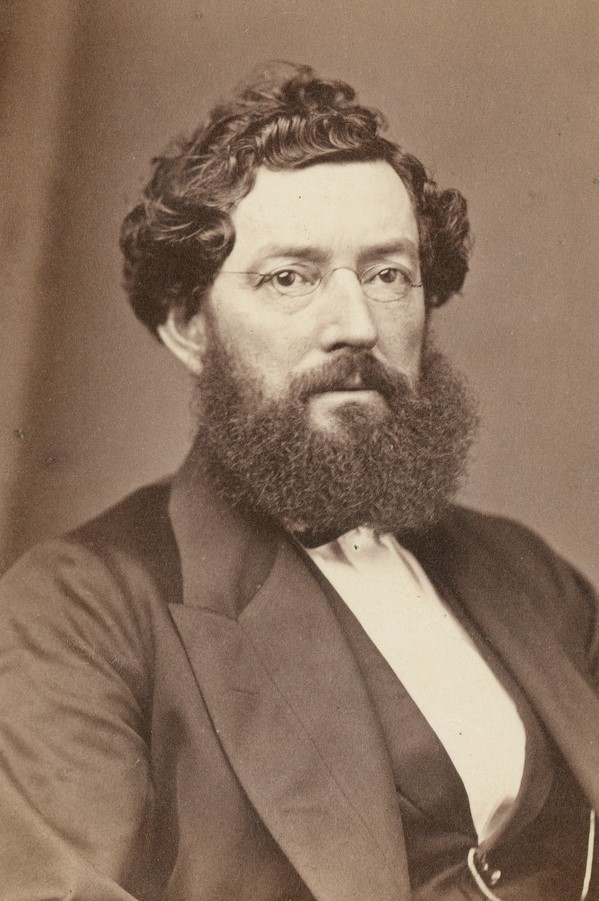

Henry Robert Fuller (22 January 1825 – 27 August 1905) was a businessman in South Australia, Mayor of Adelaide from 1866 to 1869 and a member of both houses of the South Australian parliament.

== History ==
Fuller was born in Cambridge Heath, London the eldest son of H. P. Fuller, a surgeon of Hackney Road, London. He was educated at E. Duke's academy, "Belle Vue", at Ball's Pond, near Highbury, then at Mr. Burn's school, Kennington Common. He was employed as the second officer on several P. & O. steamships. He left the company at Port Adelaide in 1845, and worked as a carter, carrying goods between the port and Adelaide city. In 1856 he and partners Henry Hill and George Mills won the contract to manage rail freight between the port and the city. When Cobb and Co., who had taken over the carrying business of William Rounsevell, decided to leave South Australia, Henry Fuller, George Mills, and John Hill (Henry's son), as John Hill & Co., took over that business, later became H. R. Fuller & Co.

Fuller was elected to the South Australian House of Assembly for West Adelaide on 9 March 1865 and held the seat until 27 March 1870.

He was mayor of Adelaide 1866–1869.

On 12 May 1894 Fuller was elected to the South Australian Legislative Council for Central District No. 1, a seat he held until 18 May 1900, representing the National Defence League.

== Other interests ==
He was a director of the National Marine Insurance Company of South Australia.

He was the owner of considerable property on Hindley Street, which included the Theatre Royal site.

== Family ==
Henry Robert Fuller married Amelia Georgina Harward (1834 – 27 August 1926) on 7 February 1853. Their children included:

- Louisa Emma Fuller (28 April 1854 – 14 July 1925) married Richard Henry Cowham on 10 March 1883, lived at Forestville.
- Alfred Frederick Richman Fuller ( – 27 October 1941) married Elizabeth Graham on 12 June 1884, with Lorimer, Rome & Co.
- Florence Bateman Fuller (ca.1858 – 2 April 1889) married Edgar Atkinson on 23 January 1884.
- Lawrence Herbert "Bert" Fuller (ca.1860 – 18 October 1926) married Jean Reeves on 15 December 1915
- William Henry Fuller (ca.1862 – 16 July 1949) married Sarah D. Graham on 13 February 1894 of Hayward Station, later Hyde Park
- Henry Ernest Fuller (13 August 1867 – 18 February 1962) was a noted Adelaide architect and prominent member of the South Australian Society of Arts. He married Margaret Sunter on 10 January 1893; they lived at "Lauriston", Kent Town, then "Lauriston", Eastwood, then Grenfell Street, Adelaide.
- Harold Reginald Fuller ( – 25 February 1948) married Ruby Hayes Norman on 24 April 1907, with Hill & Co.

Parliament of South Australia
Preceded by Emanuel Solomon	Member for West Adelaide; 1865–1870; Served alongside: James Boucaut, William Simms	Succeeded by Patrick Coglin
Political offices
Preceded by William Townsend	Mayor of the Corporation of Adelaide; 1866–1869	Succeeded by Judah Solomon
