= Randolph Isham Stow =

Australian politician (1828–1878)

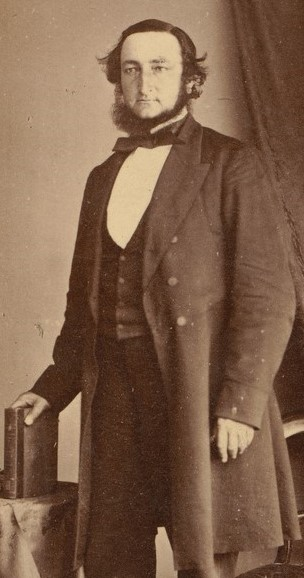
- Born: 17 December 1828; Framlingham, Suffolk, England
- Died: 17 September 1878 (aged 49); Adelaide, South Australia, Australia
- Resting place: West Terrace Cemetery, Adelaide
- Spouse: Frances Mary MacDermott (1836–1914)
- Children: Percival Randolph Stow (1857–), Ellen Harriet Stow (1858–), Reginald Marshall Stow (1862–1920), (Earnest Alfred Stow (1864–), Francis Leslie Stow (1869–)
- Parent(s): Thomas Quinton Stow and Elizabeth Randolph nee Eppes
- Relatives: Jefferson and Augustine Stow (brothers), Marshall MacDermott (father-in-law)

Member of the South Australian House of Assembly

for West Torrens 1861 – 1862

for Victoria 1863 – 1865

for East Torrens 1866 – 1868

for Light 1873 – 1875

Attorney-General of South Australia October 1861 – July 1863, July 1864 – March 1865

Judge of the Supreme Court of South Australia 15 March 1875 until his death

Premier of South Australia 3 November 1868 – 30 May 1870

Randolph Isham Stow (17 December 1828 – 17 September 1878) was an English-born Australian Supreme Court of South Australia judge.

== Early life ==
Stow was born in Framlingham, Suffolk, England and baptised at Water Lane-Independent, Bishops Stortford, Hertfordshire, England on 28 May 1829, the eldest son of the Reverend Thomas Quinton Stow and his wife Elizabeth, née Eppes. The family migrated to Adelaide, South Australia in 1837; Randolph and his brothers Jefferson and Augustine were educated at home by their father and at a school run by D. Wylie. M.A.

== Career and education ==
Randolph Stow showed great ability as a boy and was articled to a firm of lawyers, Messrs. Bartley and Bakewell. Shortly after the completion of his articles Stow became a junior partner in the firm. In 1859 Stow started a business for himself. Later, Stow was a partner with T. B. Bruce (1862–1872) and F. Ayers.

Stow was a member of the South Australian House of Assembly as member for West Torrens 1861–2, for Victoria 1863–65, East Torrens 1866-68 and Light 1873–75. In October 1861 Stow became Attorney General in the Waterhouse. Stow was Attorney General again in the Henry Ayers. By 1875 Stow was the unchallenged leader of the bar at Adelaide, and on 15 March 1875 was appointed judge of the Supreme Court, in place of William Alfred Wearing, who died on the wreck of the SS Gothenburg. Stow's health, however, had not been good for some time, and he had a heavy workload; he died age 49 of atrophy of the liver on 17 September 1878. He left a widow, four sons and two daughters. One of his sons, Percival Randolph Stow, later married K. Langloh Parker.

== The Stow medal ==
The Stow Scholarship and medal was awarded to any law student who was most successful at the final examinations in each of three successive years. Early recipients were:

- (Francis) Leslie Stow, his son, in 1892.
- Frederick William Young 1897
- Richard William Bennett, Stanley Herbert Skipper both qualified 1901. It appears Bennett was awarded the medal to the exclusion of Skipper.
- James Leslie Gordon 1904, killed at Gallipoli in August 1915
- Marmion Matthews Bray 1907
- G. C. Ligertwood 1910
- Edgar L. Stevens 1919. He was a son of Charles John Stevens (1857–1917) of the Register
- Gwendolen Helen Ure (later McCarthy) 1923
- (Duncan) Campbell Menzies 1939
- (Francis) Peter Kelly 1937. He was a son of Frank Kelly LLB
- William Andrew Noye Wells 1945

== Family ==
Randolph Isham Stow married Frances Mary MacDermott (1836 – 25 December 1914), daughter of Marshall MacDermott on 7 November 1854 at Christ Church, North Adelaide. Their family included:

- Percival Randolph Stow (c. 1857 – 20 December 1937) married Catherine Somerville "Kate" Langloh-Parker (1 May 1856 – 27 March 1940), widow of wealthy pastoralist Langloh-Parker. He was a lawyer, in partnership with Sir Josiah Symon and Arthur William Piper from 1892 to 1898.
- Ella Harriet Stow (15 October 1858 – 1 June 1944)
- Adelaide Elizabeth Stow OBE (31 May 1859 – 14 February 1945) married Lieutenant (later Vice-Admiral Sir) William Rooke Creswell (20 July 1852 – 20 April 1933) on 29 December 1888
- Reginald Marshall Stow (6 Sep 1862 – 26 April 1920) married Gertrude Mary Sullivan (1890–1982) on 28 April 1915 in York, Western Australia
- Ernest Alfred Stow (18 January 1864 – 27 March 1885)
- Francis Leslie Stow LLD (16 Oct 1869 – 12 May 1935) married Annie Duxbury (1 April 1869 – ) on 6 May 1895. He was the first to graduate LLD. from the University of Adelaide, and the first to win the Stow Scholarship and medal, founded in honor of his father. He served as Crown Solicitor and Crown Prosecutor in Perth, Western Australia.

Political offices
Preceded by Henry Strangways	Attorney-General of South Australia; 20 May 1861 – 8 Oct 1861	Succeeded by Henry Gawler
Preceded by Henry Gawler	Attorney-General of South Australia; 17 Oct 1861 – 4 Jul 1863	Succeeded by Richard Andrews
Preceded by Richard Andrews	Attorney-General of South Australia; 22 Jul 1864 – 22 Mar 1865	Succeeded by Richard Andrews
Preceded by Henry Ayers	Premier of South Australia; 3 November 1868 – 30 May 1870	Succeeded by John Hart
