= John Riddoch =

Australian politician (1827–1901)

John Riddoch (27 October 1827 – 15 July 1901) was a pastoralist and politician in the State of South Australia, brother and business partner of George Riddoch.

== History ==
Riddoch was born at Turriff, in Aberdeenshire, Scotland, and arrived in Victoria with his parents and family in 1851, settling in Newtown, Geelong. He left for the Ovens River goldfields and was quite successful. He returned to Geelong and set himself up as a storekeeper and wine merchant. In 1861 he purchased Yallum Park Estate, a sheep and cattle station near Penola. He founded the Coonawarra fruit colony there, and built a grand residence; he was noted for his hospitality.

In partnership with his brother, he bought up extensive tracts of land in the South-East of South Australia; by 1891 they owned 75,000 acres (30,000 ha) of pasture and farmland. Their greatest asset, Glencoe station, founded by Robert Leake and his brother Edward, covered 53,000 acres (21,000 ha), and carried 53,000 sheep, 3,500 cattle and 300 horses and featured a magnificent woolshed now held by the National Trust. When the Riddoch brothers dissolved their partnership in 1898, John took the southern end and broke it up for closer settlement; George named his portion "Koorine".

== Politics ==
John was elected to the district of Victoria in the House of Assembly, and served from March 1865 to April 1870 with Adam Lindsay Gordon followed by James Umpherston then Henry Kent Hughes as colleagues, and from December 1871 to April 1873 with Edwin Derrington.

His brother George followed him as a member of the House of Assembly for the District of Victoria in 1893, and served a three-year term. In 1901 he was returned to the Legislative Council as a representative of the Southern District, and retired at the end of 1909.

== Other interests ==
He was a good friend of the poet Adam Lindsay Gordon, who was a frequent guest at Yallum, and there wrote arguably his most famous poem The Sick Stockrider. John and his brother were members of the Adelaide Club. He was the first chairman of the Penola District Council and a great supporter of the Penola Agricultural and Horticultural Society. He was an elder of the local Presbyterian Church. He endowed the Mount Gambier Art Gallery, and presented them with his portrait, painted by Tennyson Cole.

== Family ==
He married Eliza or Elizabeth King ( – 2 October 1881) on 12 May 1854; he was survived by a son, John Alexander Riddoch of Katnook, and three daughters.
