= Rymill =

Rymill may refer to:

== Organisations ==
- H & F Rymill, land agents and financiers established in Adelaide, South Australia, in 1863

== People ==
- Arthur Campbell Rymill (1907–1989), businessman, solicitor and Lord Mayor of Adelaide
- Arthur Graham Rymill (1886–1966), Adelaide businessman
- Frank Rymill (1837–1915), founding partner of H & F Rymill
- Henry Rymill (1836–1927), founder of H & F Rymill
- Henry Way Rymill (1907–1971), Chief Commissioner of Scouts in South Australia from 1936
- John Rymill (1905-1968), Australian polar explorer
- Kenneth Rymill (1906–1977), English cricketer
- Mary Anne Rymill (1817–1897), New Zealand missionary, teacher, nurse and companion
- Shylie Katherine Rymill (1882–1959), State Commissioner of Girl Guides in South Australia from 1938 to 1950

== Places ==
- Cape Rymill, Antarctica
- Mount Rymill, Antarctica
- Rymill Bay, Antarctica
- Rymill Coast, Antarctic Peninsula
- Rymill House, an historic building in Hutt Street, Adelaide
- Rymill Park, in Adelaide's East Parklands
