= Richard Boucher James =

Australian pastoralist (1822–1908)

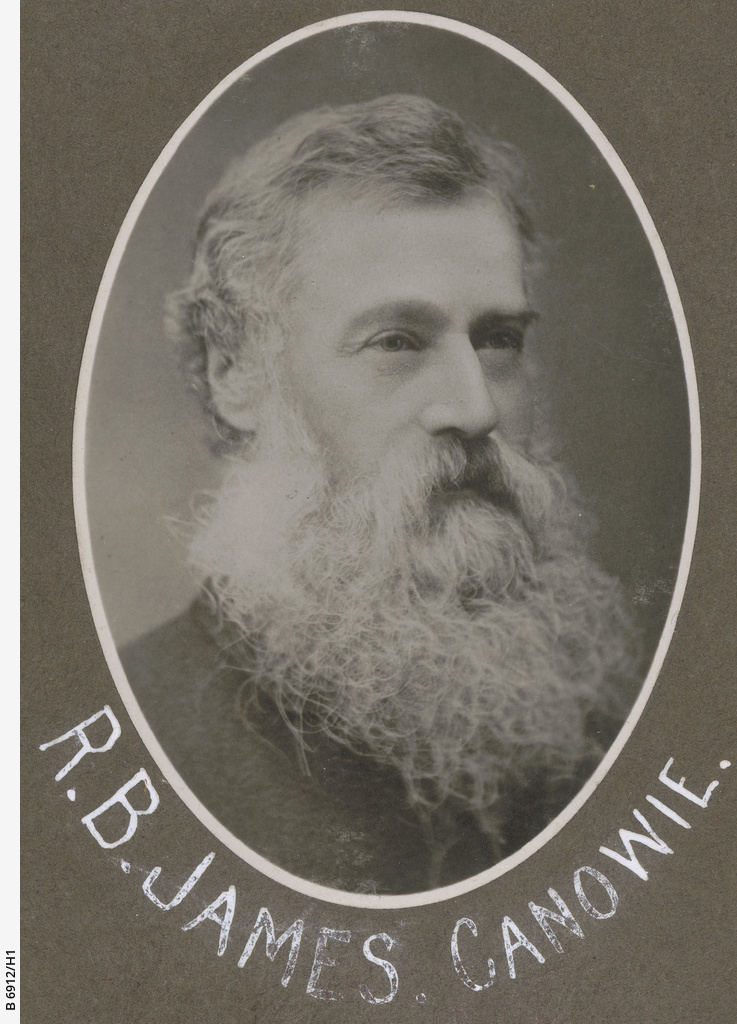
Richard Boucher James (1822–1908), photograph c. 1870, State Library of South Australia

Richard Boucher James (4 March 1822 – 4 September 1908) was a pioneering settler and pastoralist of South Australia, originally at Inman Valley from 1840 and between 1858 and 1908 at Canowie Station in the Mid North of that State.

== Early life, Jamaica, and England ==
Most usually known as Boucher James, he was born 4 March 1822, at Jamaica where his wealthy English mercantile family had coffee plantations. He was the youngest son of Herbert Jarrett James and Jane Caroline James, née Vidal. His older brothers were William Rhodes James (1817–98) – known as Rhodes – and John Vidal James (1820–97).

In 1823, with the abolition of slavery, the family began a move from Jamaica back to England where the three brothers were educated. Upon the declaration in February 1836 of the newly-promoted province of South Australia, their father saw opportunities there for the young men as sheep farmers, not as squatters but as land holders. He not only purchased land orders, but also hired experienced farmers to accompany and guide his sons. The three bachelor brothers arrived at Adelaide together in October 1839 aboard the Dumfries.

== Inman Valley, South Australia ==
After a brief stay at Adelaide in tents, early in 1840 the brothers selected and moved to newly-surveyed land at Inman Valley, south of Adelaide, being among the first European settlers there, if not the very first. Their pioneering tribulations in establishing a sheep and cattle grazing station and homestead are graphically recounted by William Rhodes James (1817-1898) in his journal. ‘James Track’, a present day arterial road, dates from this time. The James’ homestead was given its present name, Illowra Estate, by subsequent owners.

The brothers soon disagreed, going their own ways. Following the death of their father in April 1840, Rhodes James returned to England in June 1841, selling out his share in the land orders to his two younger brothers. John Vidal James (1820-1897) also soon left the station, settling on his own farming estate at Willunga. In 1851 he married Frances Lucy Fisher (1823-1909), daughter of Resident Commissioner J H Fisher. The couple returned to England in 1855.

In the meantime the youngest brother, Boucher James, married at Willunga on 15 August 1848 to Mary Le Brun, née Helmore (1819-1914), a cousin of Porter Helmore (1814-1852), pioneer settler at Encounter Bay. Soon regarded as premium sheep breeders and producers, the couple developed their Inman Valley estate until 1853, when it was sold by auction. In 1845 Boucher James had made a large but ill-fated investment as one of the 'Nobs' shareholders in the Princess Royal Mining Company, which unsuccessfully vied with the 'Snobs' of the South Australian Mining Association (SAMA) for ownership of the fabulously wealthy copper mines at Burra. Now, after a couple of years considering possibilities in pastoralism and land speculation, Boucher James invested in Canowie Station, near Burra, in 1857.

== Canowie Station, South Australia ==
Established in 1846 by the brothers William Browne and John Browne from calving off the northern part of their Booborowie run, Canowie Station was first managed by William Warwick, followed by H S Price. After ten years it was sold to a partnership of Abraham Scott (50%), Richard Boucher James (25%) Martinus Peter Hayward (12.5%), and Johnson Frederick Hayward (12.5%), with Boucher James as resident manager.

Boucher James moved there with his family and promptly commenced major changes, particularly relating to the infrastructure and the bloodlines of its sheep and cattle. In 1859 Boucher James commenced the Canowie sheep stud with 200 Saxon ewes infused with Negretti and Rambouillet rams. Canowie then comprised 362 km^{2} of leasehold land.

In 1863 Boucher and Mary James returned to England, along with their family, and Thomas Goode became resident manager. In that same year, government land reforms commenced, followed later by the Strangways Land Act, resulting in former pastoral leases being broken up and offered as freehold to encourage closer settlement. Faced with an influx of grain farming neighbours the partners adopted a policy of gradually purchasing back their own leasehold land whenever it was offered at public auction. To cater for these new arrivals, land was surveyed eleven kilometres south of the Canowie homestead for a proposed government sponsored town, also named Canowie.

== Boucher James becomes majority owner of Canowie, 1869 ==
Disagreement between the partners, primarily over land purchasing, resulted in Canowie being put up for public auction on 3 November 1869. It then comprised a mixture of freehold land and pastoral leases embracing some 110,000 acres, plus 63,000 sheep. The property was knocked down for £59,300 to a new partnership of Boucher James (37.5%), Fred Hayward (12.5%), William Sanders (25%), and J B Graham (25%).

These four men, or their descendants, were to retain the same proportion of ownership shares until the final liquidation of the enterprise in 1950. None resided at Canowie, where operations were conducted by a succession of resident managers and visiting agents, particularly the Rymill brothers. Three of the four partners resided in England, from where they directed business affairs in South Australia, eventually forming the Canowie Pastoral Company in 1894.

== Influence on Australian Pastoralism ==
In addition to Merino sheep, Boucher James was also influential in improving the bloodstock of working horses in South Australia. For example, his export in 1879 from England of the prize stud colt Tom King featured in The Farmers Magazine in England. That same year he exported shorthorn heifers into Australia from England.

Of the four, Boucher James was the only proprietor who had first-hand knowledge of Canowie, He first lived at Redlands, Bristol, in a mansion he named Canowie. He then purchased and resided at a manorial estate named Hallsannery in the civil parish of Littleham near Bideford, Devon.

The partners and their managers were aggressive in the pursuit of genetic strength in their sheep, taking many prizes and influencing the Australian wool industry. The prosperous Canowie enterprise expanded into other pastoralism land holdings, including Curnamona and Billaroo stations via Yunta. In 1905, with 68,450 acres at Canowie, the company was the third largest private freehold landholder in South Australia.

Some of Boucher James’ family also successfully followed pastoralism pursuits, most notably his Adelaide-born son, William Herbert Boucher James (1857-1940), at Erudina station, neighbouring Curnamona. W H B James’ estate in 1941 exceeded £33,000.

== Death and consequences ==
Boucher James died at his Hallsannery estate in Devon on 4 September 1908, aged 86 years. His colourful funeral attracted newspaper attention. He left a widow, five daughters, and two sons.

Although two other Canowie Pastoral Company partners had died beforehand, it was the settlement of his estate, as majority owner, that precipitated the first of a series of land and livestock auctions between 1908 and 1925 that resulted in the eventual liquidation of the company at the height of its prosperity. The auction of 1909 was the largest single auction of private freehold land ever held in South Australia to that time, but it was only the first of five such auctions. That of 1910 was even larger.
