= Littleham =

Village in Devon, England

Coordinates: 50.989°N 4.225°W

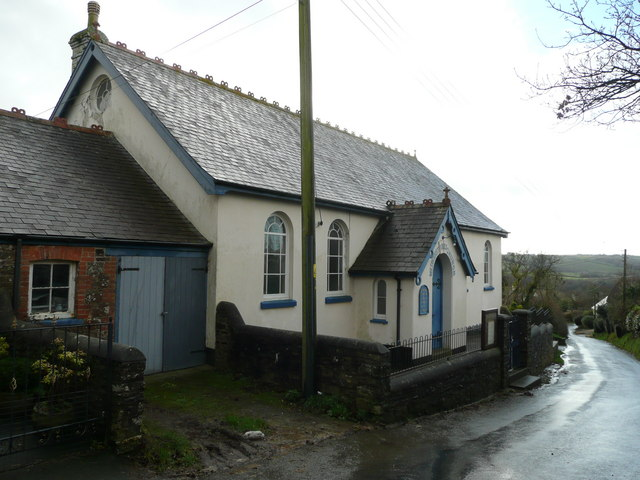
- Littleham Methodist Church

- Location within Devon
- Population: 446 (2011 Census)
- OS grid reference: SS437233
- District: Torridge
- Shire county: Devon
- Region: South West
- Country: England
- Sovereign state: United Kingdom
- Post town: BIDEFORD
- Postcode district: EX39
- Dialling code: 01237
- Police: Devon and Cornwall
- Fire: Devon and Somerset
- Ambulance: South Western
- UK Parliament: Torridge and Tavistock
- Website: Parish Council

Littleham is a village and civil parish in the Torridge district of north Devon in south west England, about 3 miles (4.8 km) south of Bideford. The parish had a population of 446 at the 2011 census.

The parish is bounded by the River Torridge in the north-east, and its tributary the River Yeo in the south and east.

== Governance ==
The first tier of local government is Littleham and Landcross parish council, a joint parish council with the small parish of Landcross which lies to the east on the opposite bank of the Yeo.

== Community facilities ==
Littleham has an active film club which meets regularly. The demographics of the village now are retired people from outside the area. A very high percentage are university educated and retired. You would not class it as a working village.

== Churches ==
There is a Methodist Chapel dated 1810, and St. Swithun's Church, which dates from Norman times.

== Estates ==
=== Hallsannery ===
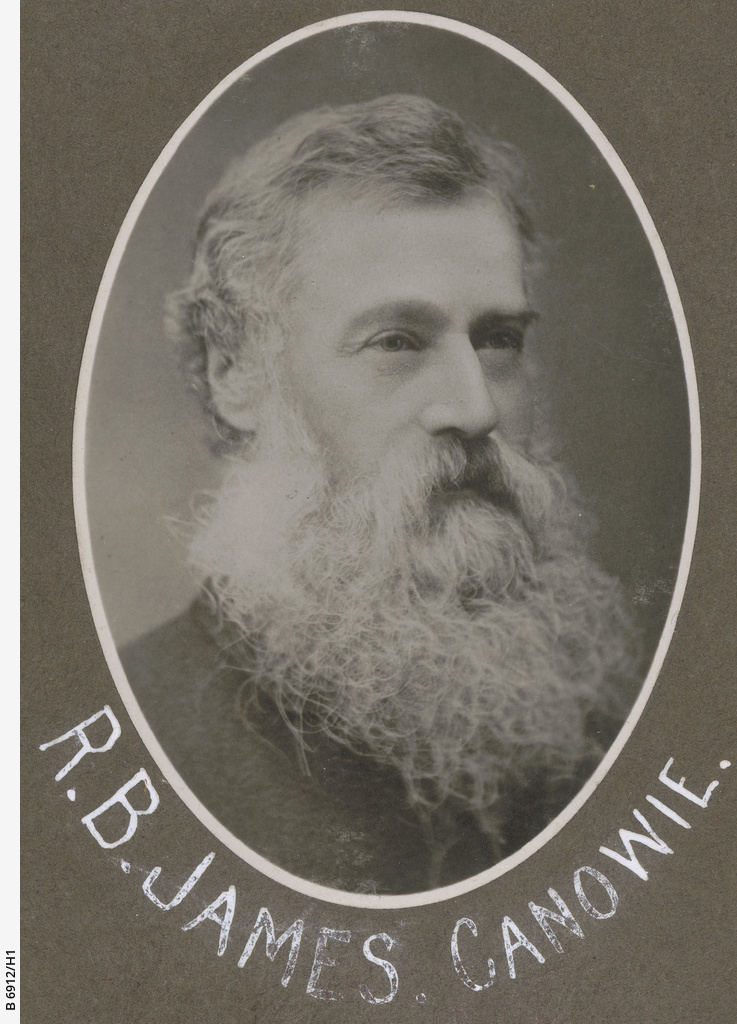
Richard Boucher James (1822-1908), photograph circa 1870, State Library of South Australia

Hallsannery is a Georgian style mansion, which should not be confused with nearby Annery, Monkleigh. In 1891 it was occupied by Richard Boucher James (1822-1908), a pioneering settler in South Australia, and his family. He was born in Jamaica and in 1839 arrived in South Australia on board the Dumfries, with two of his brothers, William Rhodes James and John Vidal James. Immediately following the completion of surveys at Inman Valley, South Australia, the land, abounding with Kangaroos, was opened for selection and in early 1840 the first European settlers to establish a homestead at Inman Valley were the three young James brothers, William Rhodes James, John Vidal James, and Richard Boucher James. They carved a shortcut – James Track – to their land. In 1848 at Willunga he married Mary Le Brun (née Helmore) (born 1821 Isle of Wight). In 1856 together with partners he purchased the 60,000 acre Canowie Station, where he lived until 1863, when he returned to England. In Devon he purchased Hallsannery House from where he continued his interest and management of the Canowie Pastoral Company until his death in 1908. He gave his profession in the 1891 census as "Land & Stockholder in Australia".

== Transport ==
There are two buses per week into Bideford and Barnstaple (Tuesday and Friday). In the other direction, service 372 by Turner Buses goes to Bradworthy.
