= Inman River =

River in South Australia

Inman
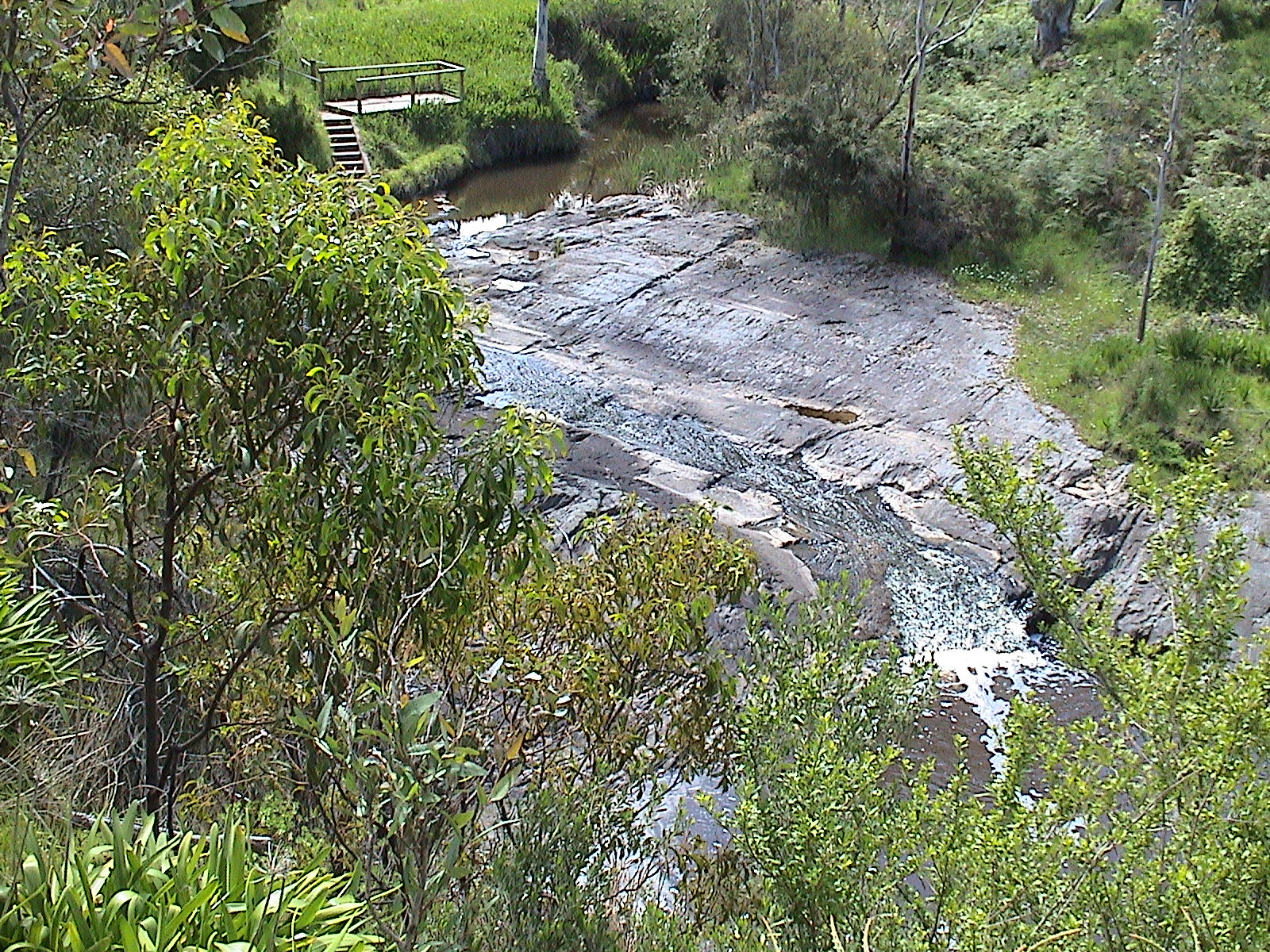
- Glaciated pavement in the Inman River

- Location of the river mouth in South Australia
- Etymology: Henry Inman
- Native name: Moo-oola; Moogoora (Ngarrindjeri)

Location
- Country: Australia
- State: South Australia
- Region: Fleurieu Peninsula

Physical characteristics
- Source: Mount Lofty Range
  - location: Bald Hills
  - coordinates: 35°30′S 138°25′E
  - elevation: 137 m (449 ft)
- Mouth: Encounter Bay
  - location: Victor Harbor
  - coordinates: 35°33′40″S 138°36′40″E
  - elevation: 0 m (0 ft)
- Length: 26 km (16 mi)

The Inman River is a small river draining the eastern side of the Fleurieu Peninsula in the Australian state of South Australia.

== Course and features ==
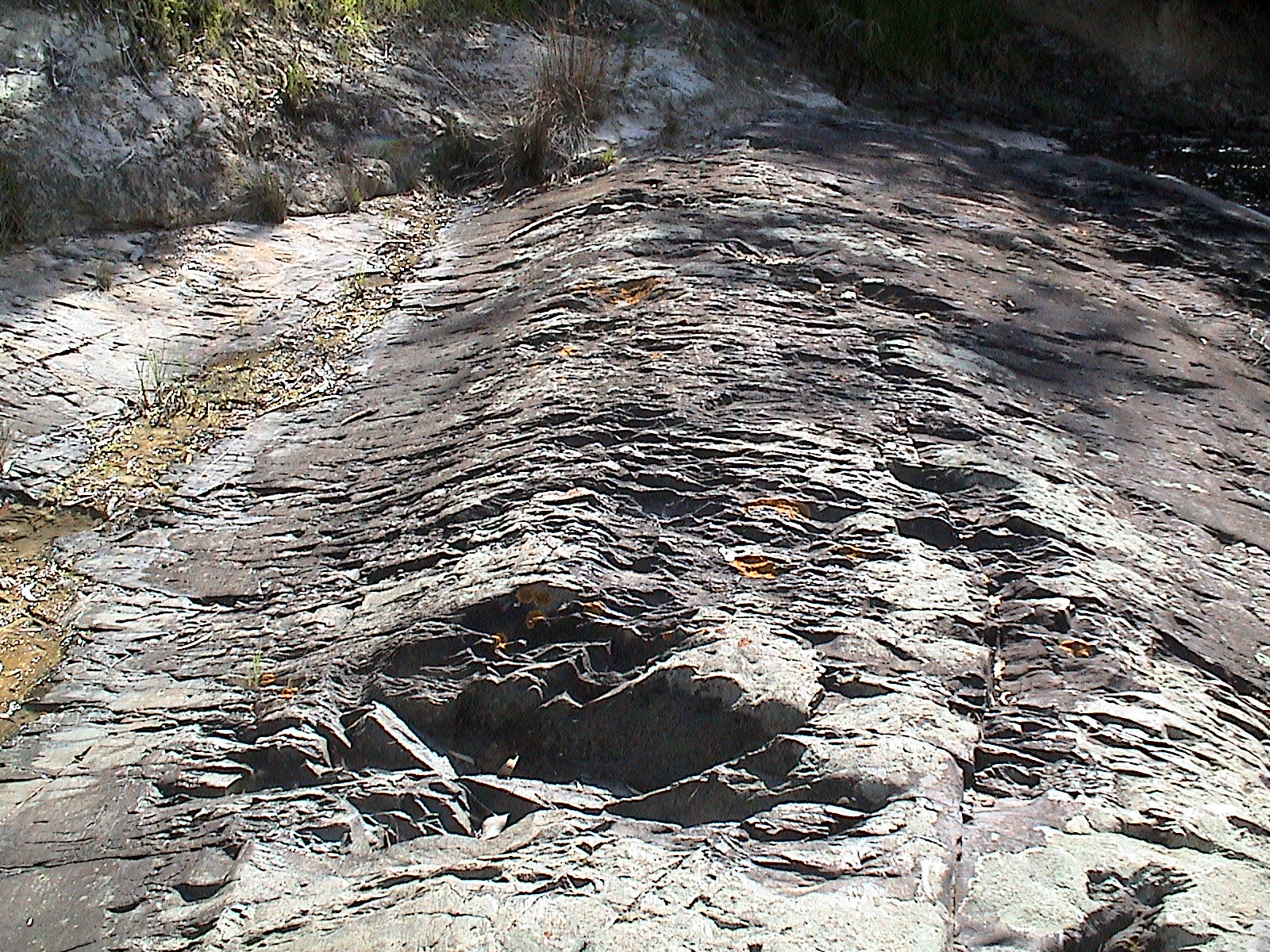
Selwyn Rock - grooves and striations on exhumed Permian glacial pavement

The Inman River rises on the eastern slopes of the Mount Lofty Range and its headwaters drain the Inman Valley as the river flows southeast towards its mouth emptying into Encounter Bay on the southern side of Victor Harbor. The river descends 142 metres (466 ft) over its 26-kilometre (16 mi) course.

== Etymology ==
The Inman River was named through association with Inspector Henry Inman, founder and first commander of the South Australia Police, who pursued two allegedly escaped convicts there in August 1838. Two indigenous names are recorded for the river: Moo-oola and Moogoora. The mouth was called Mugurank, meaning 'place of hammerstones'.

Selwyn Rock, named after Alfred Richard Cecil Selwyn who first discovered it in 1859, is a glaciated pavement in the bed of the river near the settlement of Inman Valley which clearly shows evidence of Glacial striation.

== See also ==
- List of rivers of Australia § South Australia
