= 1862 South Australian colonial election =

- 10–24 November 1862

All 36 seats in the House of Assembly
- Registered: 21,841
- Turnout: N/A (Note: Turnout and informal voting details were not published for Light. In the other 15 electorates, the turnout was 8,531 (39.1%), the formal vote was 8,057 (94.4%) and the informal vote was 474 (5.6%).)
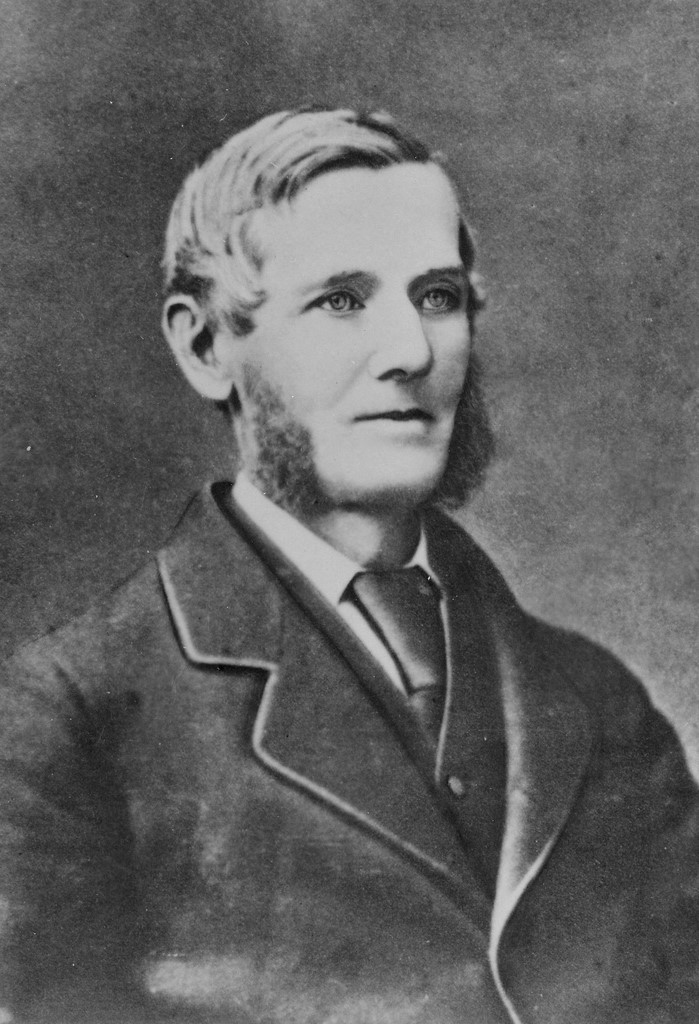
Leader	George Marsden Waterhouse
Leader's seat	Legislative Council
- Results by electoral district for the House of Assembly
Premier before election
George Marsden Waterhouse
Elected Premier
George Marsden Waterhouse

The 1862 South Australian colonial election was held between 10 and 24 November 1862 to elect members to the 3rd Parliament of South Australia. All 36 seats in the House of Assembly (the lower house) were up for re-election.

The election used non-compulsory plurality block voting, in which electors voted for as many candidates as they wished. Members of the House of Assembly were elected to 18 multi-member districts consisting of two seats each. Suffrage extended to men (including Aboriginal men) over 21 years of age, unless they were "attainted or convicted of treason or felony".

No parties or solid groupings would be formed until after the 1890 election, which resulted in frequent changes of the Premier. If the incumbent Premier lost sufficient support through a successful motion of no confidence at any time, he would tender his resignation to the Governor, which would result in another member being elected and sworn in by the Governor as the next Premier.

== Results ==
=== House of Assembly ===
House of Assembly (AV) – Turnout N/A (Non-CV)
Party	Votes			Seats	
Party	Votes	%	Swing (pp)	Seats	Change
Independent	13,157	100.0	±0.0	36	Steady
Total	13,157	100.0	–	36	
Formal votes	N/A	–	–		
Informal votes	N/A	–	–		
Turnout	N/A	–	–		
Enrolled voters	21,841	–	–		
Source: Electoral Commission of South Australia

== See also ==
- Members of the South Australian House of Assembly, 1862–1865
- 1861 South Australian Legislative Council election
