= Inman Valley, South Australia =

Inman Valley South Australia
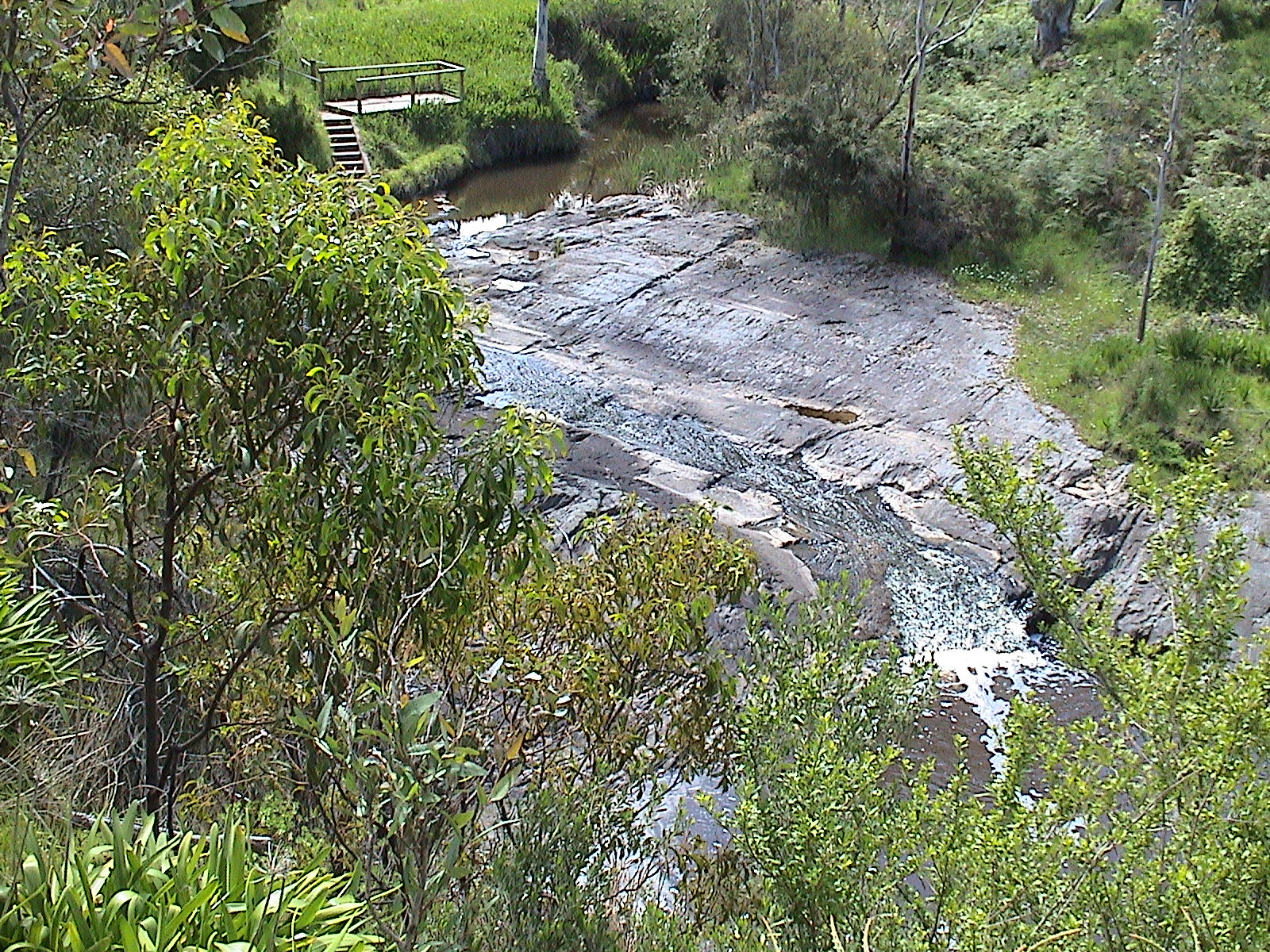
- Glaciated pavement in the Inman River

- Coordinates: 35°29′43″S 138°27′18″E
- Population: 343 (2016 census)
- Postcode(s): 5211
- Location: 86 km (53 mi) South of Adelaide
- LGA(s): City of Victor Harbor; District Council of Yankalilla
- Region: Fleurieu and Kangaroo Island
- County: Hindmarsh
- State electorate(s): Finniss; Mawson
- Federal division(s): Mayo
| Mean max temp | Mean min temp | Annual rainfall |
| 19.4 °C; 67 °F | 7.5 °C; 46 °F | 756.3 mm 29.8 in |
Localities around Inman Valley:
| Wattle Flat | Wattle Flat; Myponga; Hindmarsh Tiers | Hindmarsh Tiers |
| Yankalilla; Bald Hills; Torrens Vale | Inman Valley | Hindmarsh Valley; Lower Inman Valley |
| Torrens Vale | Torrens Vale; Back Valley | Back Valley |
- Footnotes: Adloining localities

Inman Valley is a locality in the Australian state of South Australia located on the Fleurieu Peninsula about 86 kilometres (53 mi) south of the state capital of Adelaide. The valley is about 380 square kilometres (150 sq mi) in area. At the 2016 census, Inman Valley had a population of 343.

== Origin of the name ==
Inman Valley, and Inman River, was named through association with Inspector Henry Inman, founder and first commander of the South Australia Police, who pursued two allegedly escaped convicts there in August 1838. No Indigenous name is recorded for the valley itself, but two names are recorded for the river: Moo-oola and Moogoora. The mouth was called Mugurank, meaning 'place of hammerstones'.

== History ==
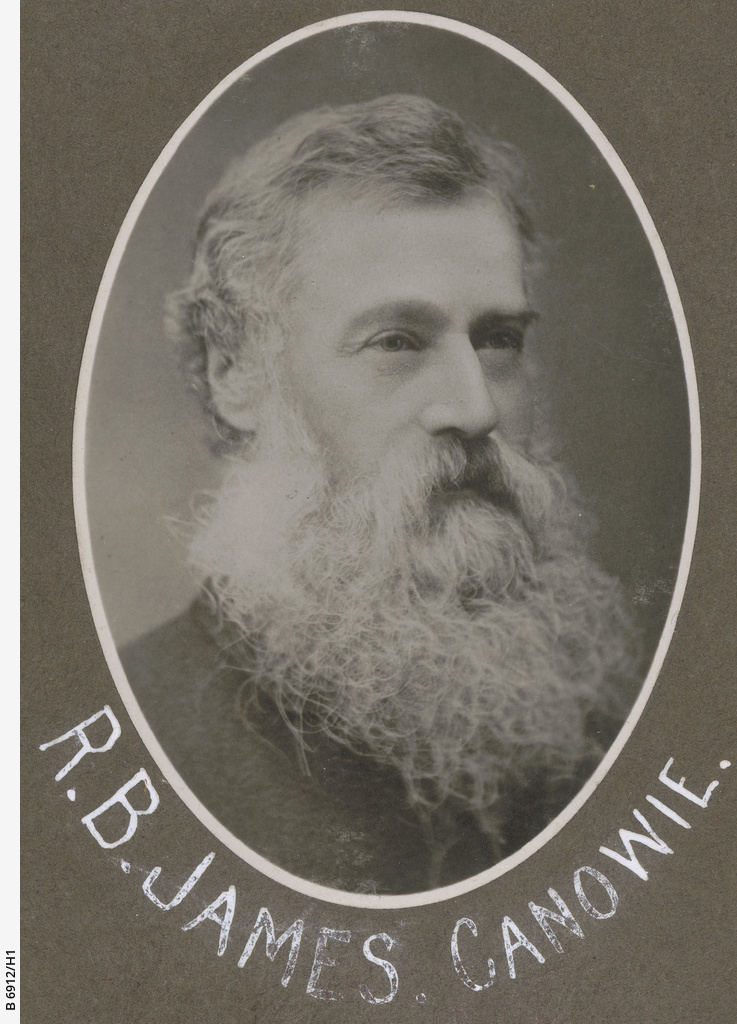
Richard Boucher James (1822–1908), photograph c. 1870, State Library of South Australia

The first recorded Europeans to sight the valley were likely the party that accompanied explorer Collet Barker (but not Barker himself) in 1831. In its pristine state the valley abounded in kangaroos, which were hunted for food by early sealers and whalers at Encounter Bay.

Inman Valley was surveyed in late 1839 by a party under Senior Surveyor N. Lipscomb Kentish, formerly of Sydney, assisted by Surveyor Henry Ide, formerly a corporal in the Royal Sappers & Miners (see Royal Engineers). They pegged out the sections and also a line of road suitable for drays leading from Rapid Bay to Encounter Bay, which is now Inman Valley Road.

Immediately following the completion of surveys the land was opened for selection and in early 1840 the first European settlers to establish a homestead at Inman Valley were the three young James brothers: William Rhodes James, John Vidal James and Richard Boucher James. Their pioneering endeavours were recorded by Rhodes in his journal. They carved a shortcut—James Track—to their land. In 1858, together with partners, Richard Boucher James purchased the 60,000-acre Canowie Station, where he lived until 1863, when he returned to England. In Devon he purchased the Georgian-style mansion Hallsannery House in the parish of Littleham, from where he continued his interest and management of the Canowie Pastoral Company until his death in 1908.

The other contenders at being first residents of Inman Valley, around the same time, are the brothers Thomas Bewes Strangways and Giles Edward Strangways, but their land was near the mouth of the valley at Encounter Bay. Other pioneering settlers promptly joined them, including William Robinson, the latter being the first to drive a horse and cart over Mount Terrible. Other settlers soon followed, such as John Lush.

Although various crops flourished, and sheep were successful, from the very earliest years cattle were known to thrive at Inman Valley and so they predominated. By the 1880s this led to an extensive dairying industry, including butter and cheese production, with a butter factory being established in 1890.

Present-day land use is predominantly grazing, dairy farming, forestry and horticulture. The valley area also attracts bushwalkers and tourists.

== Selwyn Rock ==
In the valley is Selwyn Rock (35°29′47″S 138°30′45″E) a glaciated pavement in the bed of the Inman River. It was first described in 1859 by, and later named for, A.R.C. Selwyn, who was Victorian Government geologist at the time. Glacial grooves and striations on the polished surface indicate glacial movement to the north-west. Boulder clays, tillites and erratics are also common in the area, which underwent glaciation during the Permian (approximately 270 Ma). The pavement of Cambrian bedrock and Permian glacial sediments were exposed during the Tertiary when the Inman River eroded the topography to its present-day surface. A cafe overlooks the glaciated bed of the river, with access onto the rock available via stairs and viewing platforms.

== Gallery ==
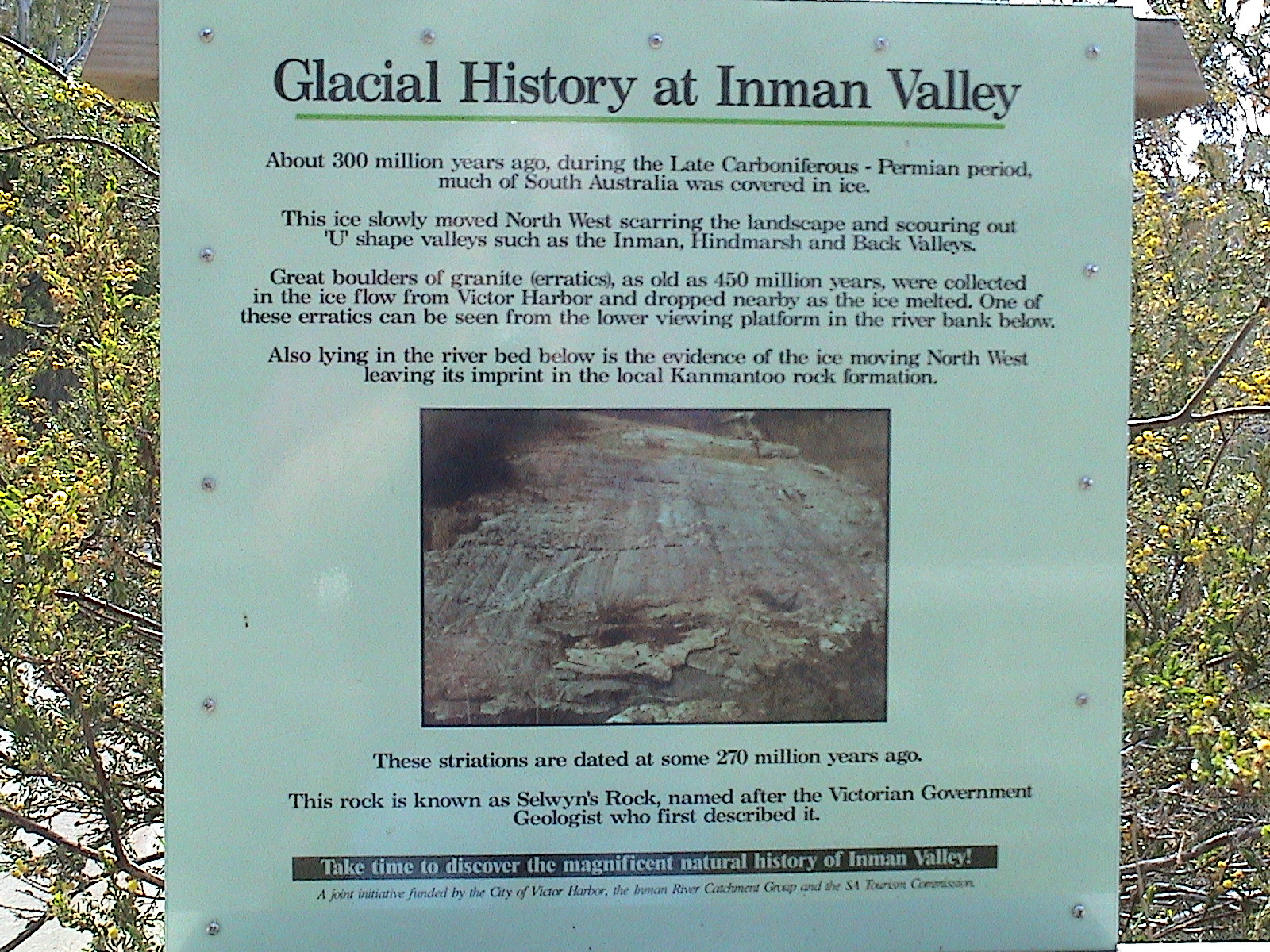
Interpretive sign at Selwyn Rock marking Selwyn's discovery of glaciation in Australia

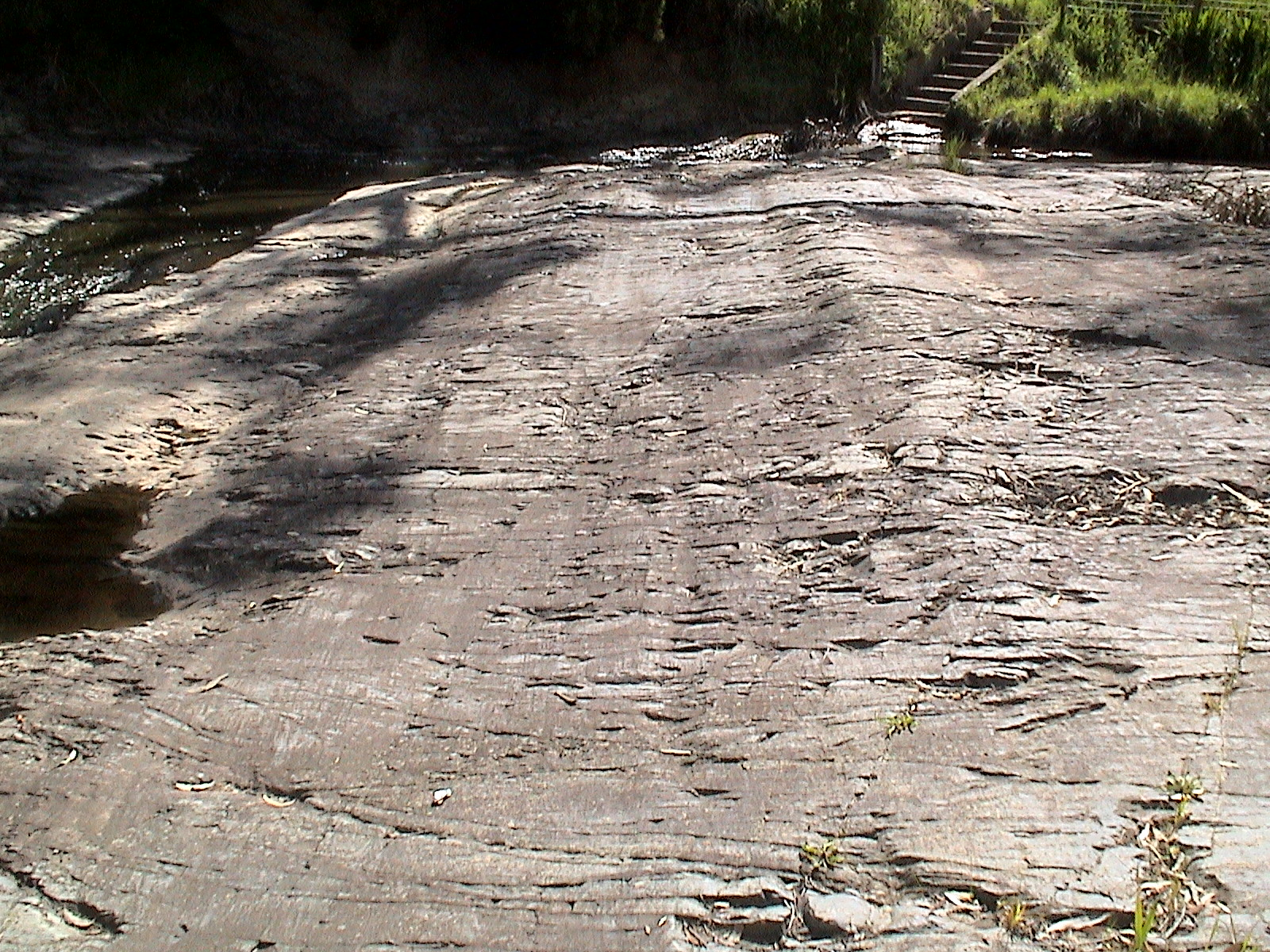
Selwyn Rock – grooves and striations on exhumed Permian glacial pavement

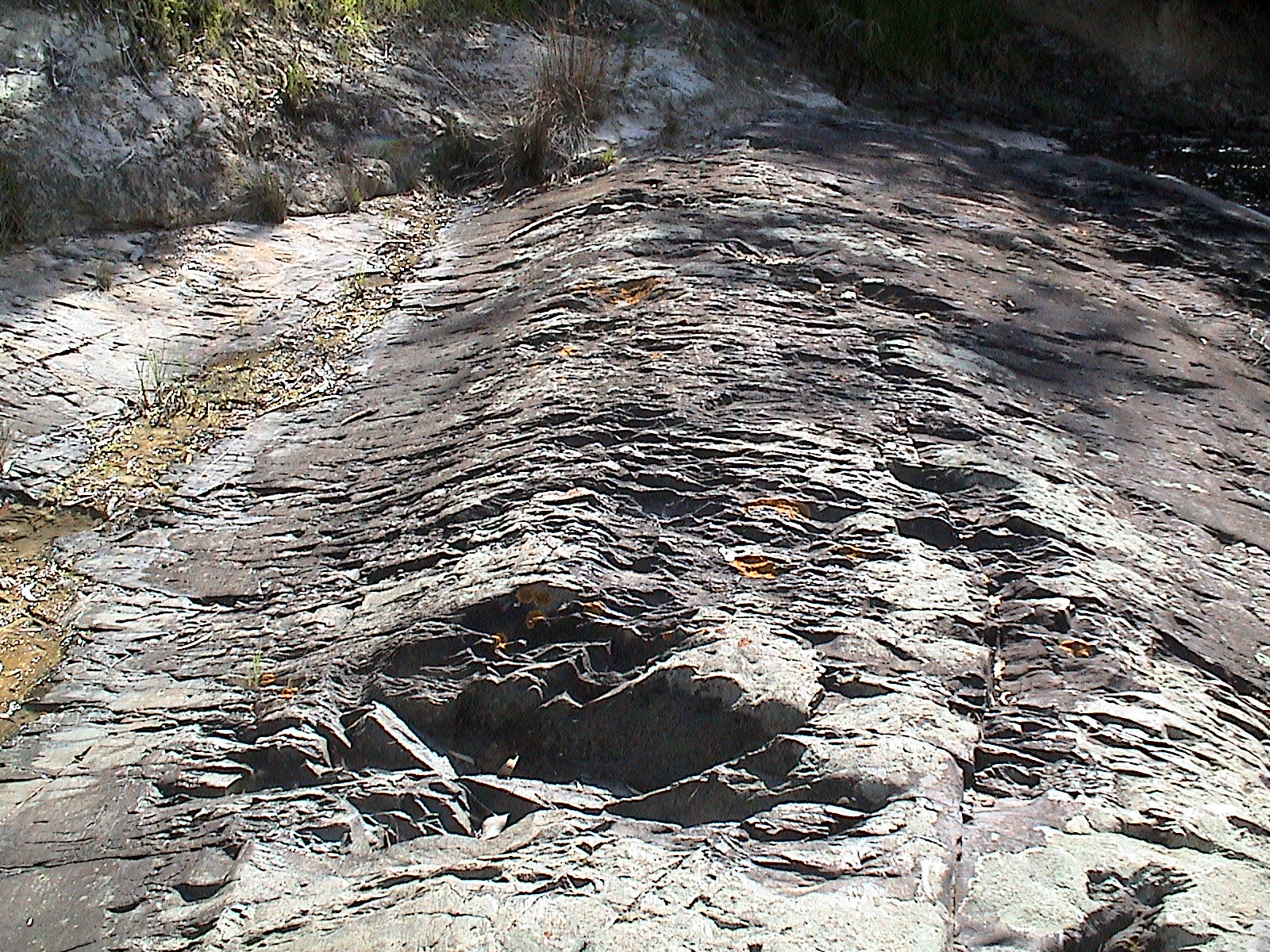
Selwyn Rock – grooves and striations on exhumed Permian glacial pavement

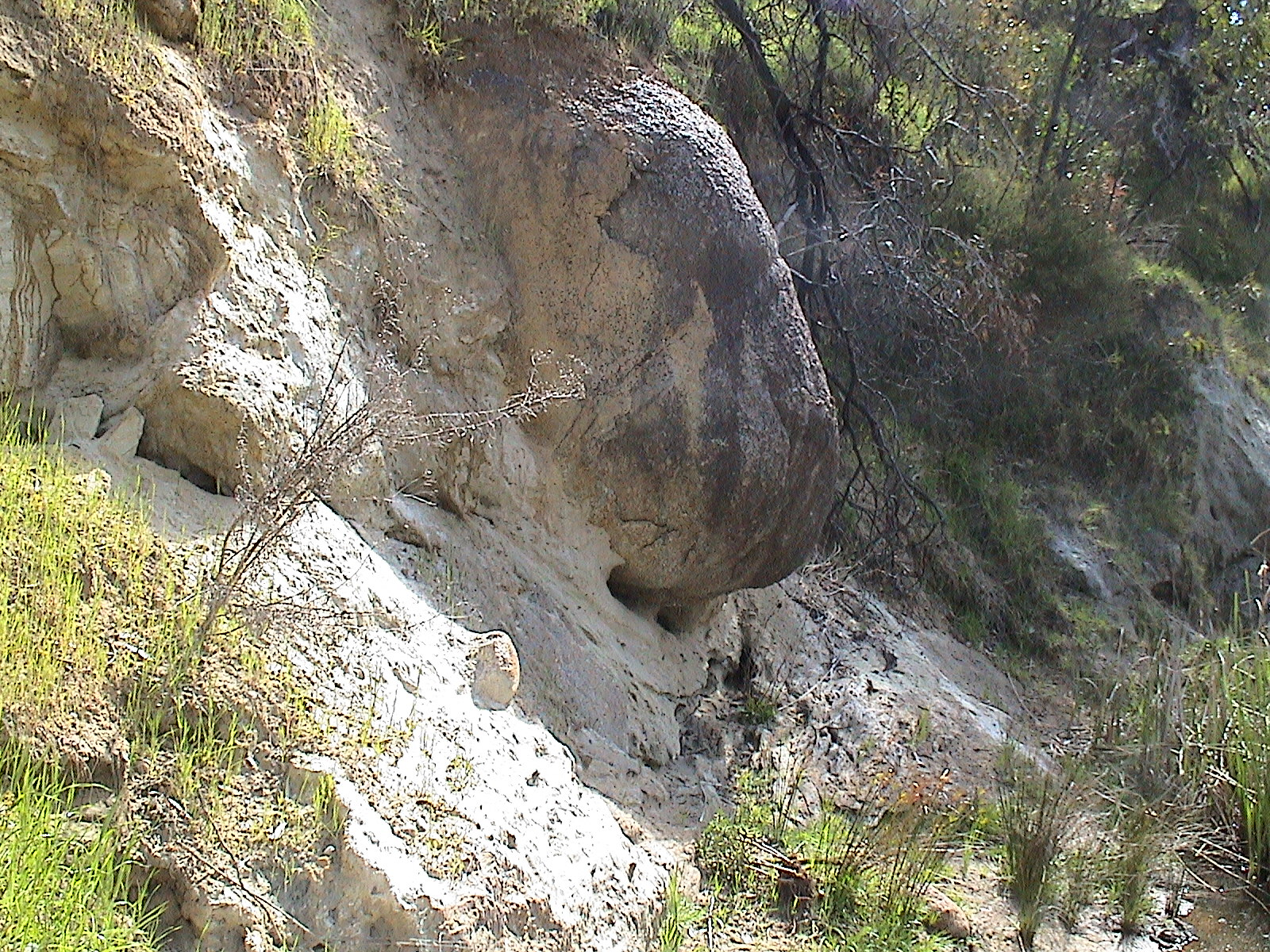
Selwyn Rock – granite glacial erratic eroding out of unconsolidated Permian till

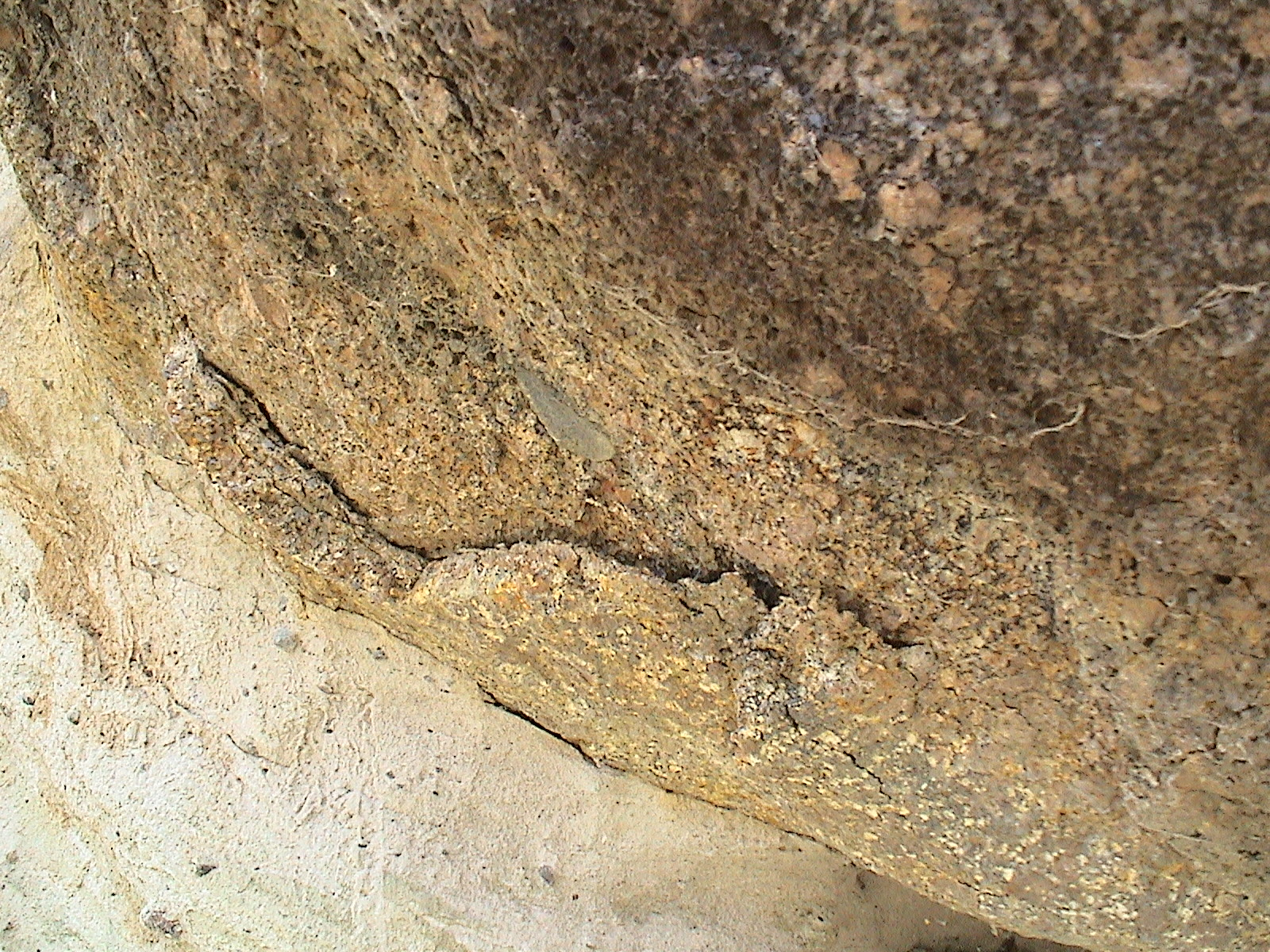
Selwyn Rock – Weathering rind of large granite glacial erratic eroding out of unconsolidated Permian till

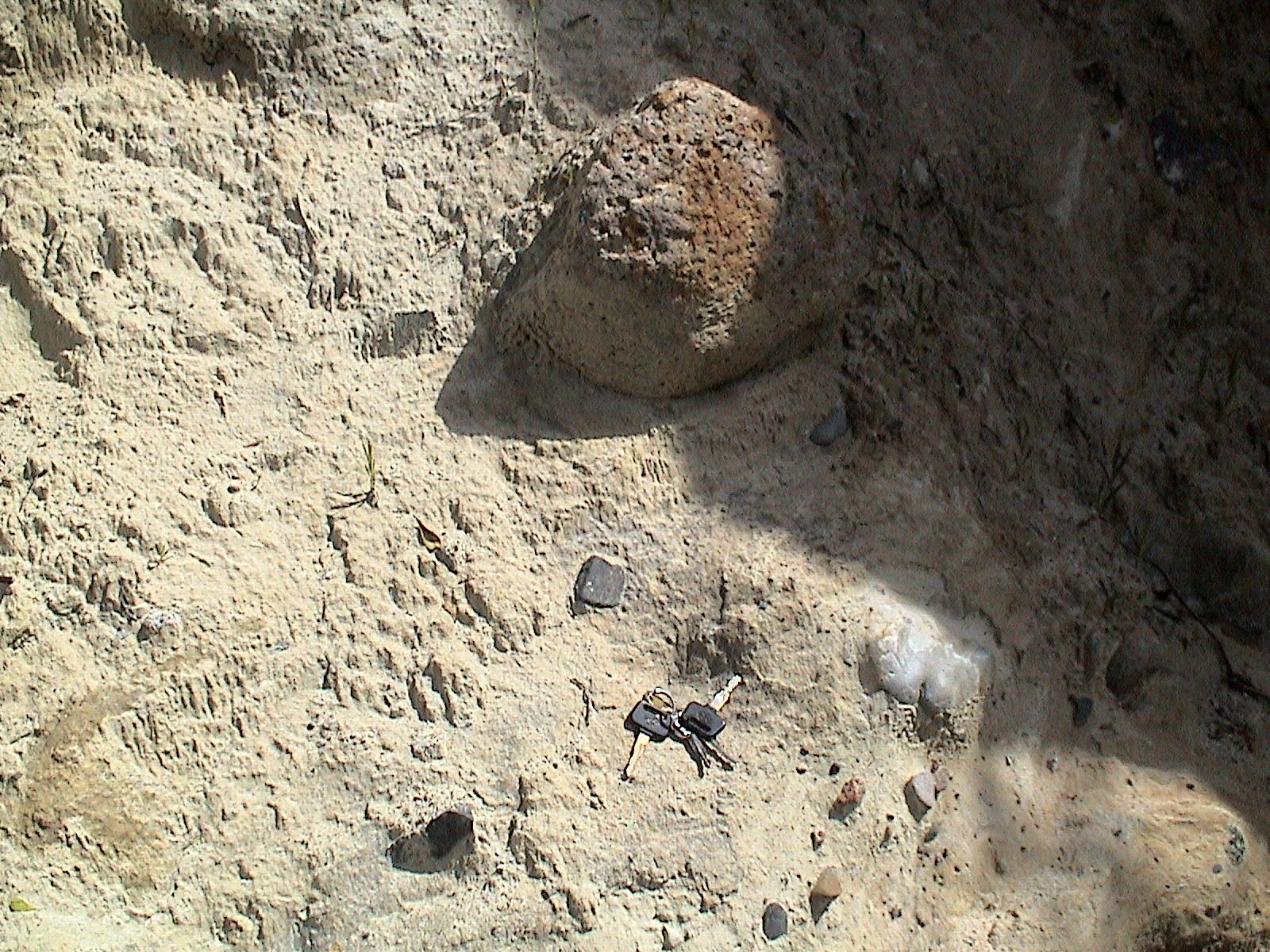
Selwyn Rock – faceted pebble eroding out of unconsolidated Permian till
