= Shylie Katherine Rymill =

Australian guiding leader (1882 – 1959)

Shylie Katharine Rymill OBE
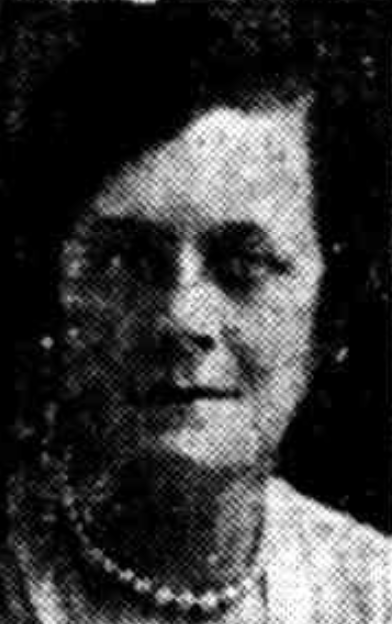
- Born: 16 May 1882; Strathalbyn, South Australia
- Died: 3 April 1959 (aged 76); Thorngate, South Australia
- Occupations: The Girl Guides Association’s South Australia branch state commissioner Golfer
- Spouse: Herbert Lockett "Cargie" Rymill (1870–1951)
- Children: Henry Way Rymill; William Seaton Rymill; Edward Gordon "Tom" Rymill; Katherine Lucy Rymill

Shylie Katherine Rymill (née Blue; 16 May 1882 – 3 April 1959) was The Girl Guides Association’s South Australia branch state commissioner from 1938 to 1950. She was an accomplished golfer.

== Biography ==
Rymill was the youngest child of William Archibald Sinclair Blue (an English-born physician and surgeon) and Katharine Gollan née Gordon. As a young woman she became a noted member of Adelaide society and undertook significant charity work.

She married Herbert Lockett "Cargie" Rymill (19 August 1870 – 27 March 1951) on 18 September 1906. "Cargie", son of Henry Rymill, was a golf-course designer.

Their children include:

- Henry Way Rymill CBE (9 October 1907 – 8 January 1971), Chief Commissioner of Scouts in South Australia
- William Seaton Rymill (12 April 1909 – 12 August 1987), a noted golfer.
- Edward Gordon "Tom" Rymill (11 November 1910 – 16 February 1989), managed "Balquhidder Station" on the Fleurieu Peninsula, South Australia. "Balquhidder Station" was later bought by Kerry Stokes.
- Katherine Lucy Rymill (24 May 1913 – ), a noted golfer and Red Cross worker.

=== Golf ===
In 1913, Rymill won the South Australian Women's Golf Championship, as well as winning the Kooyonga Golf Club's women's championship in 1925, 1927 and 1928.

She also took on a number of leadership positions within the sport, including as Associate-Captain (1915, 1923 and 1933–34) of the (Royal) Adelaide Golf Club, Ladies' captain (1924–28 and 1932) at Kooyonga Golf Club, and Founding President (1925–30) of the South Australian Ladies' Golf Union.

The Shylie Rymill Foursomes nett event is a state competition named in honour of her founding of the SA Ladies Golf Union.

=== Guiding ===
In 1927, Rymill was President of the local committee of the Richmond Company of the Girl Guides Association of South Australia. By 1931 she was Commissioner of the Western Metropolitan Division.

Rymill became State Commissioner for South Australia in 1938, remaining in that post until 1950. During World War II, she was involved in raising almost £72,000 for charities through organising the Girl Guides Thrift Campaign. In her obituary, she was remembered as the SA Guides' 'Wartime Chief'. She was awarded the Silver Fish Award, Girl Guiding's highest adult honour, in 1948.

== Honours ==
- Officer of the Order of the British Empire (1942) for 'Social Welfare'
- Silver Fish Award (1948)
- Life Member of the South Australia State Council of the Girl Guides Association of Australia
