= 1861 South Australian Legislative Council election =

- 28 March 1861

6 (of the 18) seats in the South Australian Legislative Council

The 1861 South Australian Legislative Council election was held on 28 March 1861. Six of the 18 seats in the Legislative Council (the upper house) were up for re-election.

The election used non-compulsory plurality block voting, in which electors voted for as many candidates as they wished. Members were elected in a single 18-member district, with suffrage extended to men (including Aboriginal men) over 21 years of age who owned property worth at least £50, unless they were "attainted or convicted of treason or felony".

As per section eight of the Constitution Act 1856, six members of the Legislative Council must vacate their seats every four years.

== Outgoing members ==
The outgoing members vacated their seats on 2 February 1861. Five of the six members contested the election. Names in bold won re-election, whilst names in italic ran unsuccessfully.

Member	Date elected
Charles Hervey Bagot	9 March 1857
John Baker	9 March 1857
**Samuel Davenport**	9 March 1857
**Anthony Forster**	9 March 1857
**Abraham Scott**	9 March 1857
William Younghusband	9 March 1857

== Results ==
Legislative Council (BV) – Turnout 21.3% (Non-CV)
Party	Votes			Seats	
Party	Votes	%	Swing (pp)	Seats	Change
**Independent**	**13,214**	**100.0**	**±0.0**	**18**	0
**Total**	**13,214**	**100.0**	–	**18**	
Informal votes	214	7.3	–6.3		
Turnout	2,921	21.3	–35.4		
Registered voters	13,731	–	–		
Source: ECSA

=== The Province ===
1861 South Australian Legislative Council election: The Province
Candidate	Votes	%	±
John Henry Barrow **(elected 1)**	1,706	12.9	+12.9
Samuel Davenport **(elected 2)**	1,616	12.2	+8.5
Anthony Forster **(elected 3)**	1,491	11.3	+6.5
Abraham Scott **(elected 4)**	1,455	11.0	+6.7
Judah Moss Solomon **(elected 5)**	1,225	9.3	+9.3
William Peacock **(elected 6)**	1,185	9.0	+5.9
William Giles	1,123	8.5	+8.5
William Younghusband	1,080	8.2	+3.0
John Bentham Neales	933	7.1	+7.1
John Baker	901	6.8	+2.5
Arthur Hardy	318	2.4	–0.4
Edward Collett Homersham	181	1.4	+1.4
Total formal votes	2,707	92.7	+6.3
Informal votes	214	7.3	–6.3
Turnout	2,921	21.3	–35.4

== See also ==
- Members of the South Australian Legislative Council, 1861–1865
