= Rymill brothers =

19th century settlers in Adelaide, South Australia

Henry Rymill (1 May 1836 – 21 February 1927) and Frank Rymill (27 November 1837 – 26 May 1915) were brothers prominent in business and public service in the 19th century South Australia. Henry "Harry" Rymill and Francis "Frank" Rymill were born in England, sons of Robert Rymill and Louisa (née Sheppard) Rymill of Shepperton, and migrated to South Australia, arriving at Port Adelaide in the Caucasian on 1 October 1855. Their company H & F Rymill was a prominent financial institution well into the 20th century. Their families included a number of prominent Adelaide citizens.

Robert (1869–1906), Herbert (1870–1951) and Sidney (1873–1938) also traded as "Rymill Brothers

"Rymill Brothers" could also refer to the speedboat racing team of Arthur Graham Rymill (1868–1934) and Ernest Seymour Rymill (1876–1931) – see their notes below.

It could also refer to the partnership of cricketer Jack Westall Rymill (1901–1976) and golfer William Seaton Rymill (1909–1987), actually cousins, who ran several sheep and cattle stations.

== Henry Rymill ==
Henry was working as a lawyer's clerk in London when persuaded by brother-in-law J. B. Graham of Prospect to emigrate to the new colony. Despite numerous letters of introduction, he was unable to find congenial employment and finally at the home of Arthur John Baker (1814 – 4 July 1900), (Superintendent of the Fire Brigade and his future father-in-law) he was introduced to Captain Hughes (later Sir Walter Watson Hughes) who offered him employment as a gardener at Watervale.

A. J. Baker's first wife was Margaretta Emily Potts née Lockett (1810–1890). Her step-sister Anne Potts (28 November 1812 – 14 August 1881) married Henry Ayers, and her step-brother was winemaker Frank Potts. Baker's second wife was Annie (ca.1841 – 30 April 1900). Their son Arthur (ca.1845 – 5 October 1856) was drowned in the Torrens.

He soon attracted the attention of Henry Ayers, who was looking for a bookkeeper and cashier for the South Australian Mining Association in the Waterhouse Chambers ("Waterhouse Corner"). In 1862 he decided to go into business for himself and was so successful that around 1865 he took his brother Frank (by then secretary to the Commissioner of Crown Lands) into partnership. Aside from this business he became

- Part-owner and director of Canowie Pastoral Company, a merino sheep stud
- Director, Bank of Adelaide
- Director, Adelaide Milling Company
- Director, Victoria Insurance Company
- Member, Central Board of Health
- Director, Wyatt Benevolent Fund

=== Family of Henry Rymill ===
Henry married Lucy Lockett Baker (19 October 1839 – 19 October 1885) at Holy Trinity Church, North Terrace on 10 July 1861. Their children included:

- Florence Edith Rymill (2 June 1862 – 10 March 1933) never married.
- Harry Esmond Rymill (30 January 1864 – 9 March 1949) was a life member of the South Australian Jockey Club and partner of H. & F. Rymill.
- Lucy Isabel Rymill (31 March 1865 – 22 April 1929) married Alfred Austin Lendon MD on 26 August 1889.
- Frank Westall Rymill (17 June 1866 – 5 July 1924) married Mary Anna Hayward (9 July 1872 – 25 February 1941) on 14 February 1899. She was the first secretary of the South Australian chapter of the Country Women's Association and prominent in the National Council of Women, Liberal and Country League, Girton School for Girls and Mothers and Babies' Health Association. She was a noted benefactor, and was awarded the OBE on 1 January 1941 for her services to the community. Frank managed Winnininnie station near Broken Hill, before retiring to "Bungala House" in Yankalilla, and then Godfrey Street, Leabrook. They had one daughter and three sons,

- Jack Westall Rymill (20 March 1901 – 11 February 1976), a noted cricketer, married Lucie Shanno Walker (1904-1981) on 17 July 1937. He was a captured in Java during World War II and survived as a POW. Their children included:

- Cecily Westall Rymill (1939-1991) married John Spalvins

- Max Hayward Rymill (17 November 1902 – ) married Bernadine Lempriere "Bernie" Reid on 18 December 1940
- Keith S(eymour) Rymill (2 August 1905 – ), a pastoralist associated with Bon Bon, Glen Lyon, Yardea and Wooling Stations. He was a keen deep-sea fisherman and clay target marksman.
- Madeline Florence "Madge" Rymill ( – 23 June 1950)

- Arthur Graham Rymill (9 May 1868 – 10 September 1934) married Agnes Lucy Campbell (1 February 1886 – 22 August 1966) on 7 June 1905. He was a principal of H & F Rymill; chairman of directors, Bennett and Fisher; a director of the Bank of Adelaide, Holden, Colton, Palmer & Preston, and Royal Insurance Company; and Executor and managing director of Canowie Pastoral Company, and with his brother Ernest Seymour, owned and successfully raced several hydroplane speedboats named Tortoise.

- (Sir) Arthur Campbell Rymill (8 Dec 1907 – 27 March 1989) married Margaret Earle Cudmore (daughter of Roland Cudmore) in 1934; they had two daughters. He was MLC South Australia 1956–75, was on the boards of numerous companies, won the Australasian unlimited Speedboat Championship 1933 in his father's boat Tortoise II and represented South Australia in Australasian Polo Championships 1938–51.

- Herbert Lockett "Cargie" Rymill (19 August 1870 – 28 May 1951) married Shylie Katharine Blue (16 May 1882 – 3 April 1959) on 18 September 1906. She was the Girl Guide Association’s South Australia state commissioner from 1938 to 1950, recipient of the OBE in 1942, and the Silver Fish Award in 1948. "Cargie" helped found the Royal Adelaide Golf Club at Seaton in 1902, and planned and founded Kooyonga Golf Club in 1922.

- Henry Way Rymill CBE (9 October 1907 – 8 January 1971) was The Boy Scouts Association’s South Australian branch chief commissioner from 1936 and was awarded its Silver Wolf Award in 1943. He was Commodore of the Royal SA Yacht Squadron for six years. He was appointed a CBE in 1949. Henry Rymill married Alleyne Joan Downer (7 May 1906 – c. May 1942) on 26 September 1934. They had three children. Alleyne was a daughter of James Frederick "Fred" Downer LLB (1874 – 29 May 1942) and Florence Way Downer, née Campbell, (1870–1961).
- William Seaton Rymill (12 April 1909 – 12 August 1987), a noted golfer.
- Edward Gordon "Tom" Rymill (11 November 1910 – 16 February 1989), Managed "Balquhidder Station" on the Fleurieu Peninsula. "Balquhidder Station" was later bought by Kerry Stokes.
- Katherine Lucy Rymill (24 May 1913 – ), a noted golfer and Red Cross worker.

- Ernest Seymour Rymill (21 January 1876 – 8 September 1931) shared with his brother A. G. Rymill ownership of the highly successful hydroplanes named Tortoise, and was their mechanic. He was a champion clay target marksman.

==== Family homes ====
The family home was "The Firs", East Terrace, Adelaide, now known as Rymill House, with its frontage on Hutt Street. Henry lived there until his death, and his descendants occupied the house until 1950.

Also on East Terrace was "East View", home of Lucy Rymill's father A. J. Baker.

== Frank Rymill ==
Frank travelled to Adelaide with his brother Henry. His first job in South Australia was as a shepherd at Wallaroo. Frank later held various Government positions:

- Clerk of the Police Court
- Secretary to the Crown Lands Department
- Chief Corresponding Clerk in the G.P.O.

Other positions he held were:

- Chairman of the finance committee of the Royal Agricultural Society, in recognition which he was made a life member.
- Chairman of the South Australian Mining Association, which controlled the Burra Burra Mine.
- In 1888 a founding director of the South Australian Brewing Company

Around 1865 he went into partnership with brother Henry.

=== Family of Frank Rymill ===
Frank married Anna Gall "Annie" Sanders (4 August 1846 – 25 September 1930), daughter of William Sanders and Harriet (née Carstairs) Sanders, at the Unitarian Church, Wakefield Street on 1 October 1868. Their children were:

- Robert Rymill (7 July 1869 – 14 May 1906) married Mary Edith Riddoch of Yallum on 13 March 1902. He was owner of Penola Station, and died near Hamilton, Victoria as result of a car crash.

- Robert Riddoch Rymill (25 April 1904 – 14 May 1990) married Gladys Edith Hood (10 December 1915 – ) on 23 November 1937.
- John Riddoch Rymill (13 March 1905 – 7 September 1968), married Eleanor Mary Francis (17 June 1911 – 14 April 2003), 16 September 1938. He was a noted Antarctic explorer and pastoralist of Old Penola Station.

- Mary Carstairs Rymill (1 July 1871 – 30 August 1945) married lawyer John Richard Baker, of Glenelg (son of Sir Richard Chaffey Baker) on 14 October 1905
- Sidney Rymill (6 May 1873 – 3 September 1938), of Somerton. He was on the SAJC committee, was associated with Elder, Smith & Co. and a pastoralist on Wirryilka station.

- Frances Carstairs "Frankie" Rymill (13 May 1915 – 13 October 1992) married Richard George Hawker (11 April 1907 – 12 November 1982) on 31 August 1940.
- Richard Stanley Carstairs "Dick" Rymill (12 September 1917 – 15 July 1997) married Eleanor Emily Brook Melrose (14 March 1917 – 29 October 2004), 25 November 1939.

- Adelaide Louisa Rymill (13 July 1876 – 7 September 1938) of Mitcham.
- Hettie Elsie Rymill (6 October 1881 – 26 October 1909) of Mitcham.

Their home for many years was "Springfield", Mitcham

== H. & F. Rymill ==
Henry and Frank formed a partnership H. & F. Rymill as land agents and financiers around 1863, with offices at Pirie Chambers in Pirie Street.

Much of their fortune was made in 1878 when they purchased from William King for £11,000 the lease on part of the land bounded by Pirie Street, Gawler Place, McHenry Street, part of town acres 169 and 170 purchased by George McHenry in 1837.

By a quirk of fate and some shrewd dealing and legal wrangling, it was inherited by H & F Rymill in 1896. In 1929, in a move to minimise taxation, the property was divided between the two families: the family of Frank Rymill took Pirie Chambers and the block containing Selborne Chambers and the Selborne Hotel (erected by Josiah Symon, and later the Adelaide Hotel); and Henry Rymill's family the Exchange Buildings and King's Buildings.

In 1879 they helped found a new Stock Exchange with G. Dutton Green as its head, on land known as "King's timber yard" in Pirie Street; they hired Edmund W. Wright to design the new building.

The company prospered, becoming major investors and landholders in their own right. Their properties included Canowie Station (in which for decades they acted as agents for the absentee owners and eventually held a partial ownership) and Marra Station.
