= Canowie Station =

Former pastoral lease in South Australia

Coordinates: 33.3054°S 138.7551°E

Location in South Australia

Canowie or Canowie Station was a former pastoral lease located about 18 kilometres (11 mi) north west of Hallett and 23 kilometres (14 mi) south west of Terowie in the state of South Australia.

== Locality ==
The former Canowie Station was situated midway between Hallett and Jamestown in an amphitheatre of green bald hills, the north-south trending Browne Hill Range surrounding it on the western side, the eastern opening out into a broad valley. The country around is bare of timber, with the exception of plantations of various kinds of eucalypt planted around 1880. The estate consisted principally of rich land, well suited for agriculture, about 60,000 acres in extent, freehold, and depastured 60,000 sheep and about 1000 pure Shorthorn cattle.

== Foundations ==
The first European to visit the district was Edward John Eyre in 1839. On 11 February 1846 the brothers Drs WJ and JH Browne secured Occupational Lease No.129 comprising 43,000 hectares which was later named Canowie, after the indigenous Ngadjuri name for a rock waterhole near the eventual site of the homestead. They established a sheep run and as absentee landlords they appointed family man William Warwick as manager up until 1853 when he left to develop his own run, Holowiliena Station. The brothers next appointed unmarried man Harry Price as resident manager, with a 50% ownership interest, but by 1858 all had mutually decided to sell out.

The purchasers were a partnership of four investors; Abraham Scott (50%), Richard Boucher James (25%), Martinus Peter Hayward (12.5%) and his brother Johnson Frederick Hayward (12.5%). R Boucher James became resident manager, immediately moving there with his family. Being a former pastoralist at Inman Valley, that same year he began a Shorthorn Durham cattle stud, and in 1859 he commenced the Canowie sheep stud with Negretti and Rambouillet rams. Being unfenced rangeland, several dozen shepherds were employed, housed in huts scattered all over the run. As well, surface water was so scarce that deep wells were commenced.

== Government Land Reforms ==
In 1863 government land reforms began with gradual resumption of pastoral leases for the purpose of closer settlement. That same year, for the education of his children, R Boucher James returned to England and an employee, Thomas Goode was made the manager. In 1865 a government sponsored town named Canowie was surveyed eleven kilometres south of the homestead, on the Booborowie Road. The town failed to thrive.

The government land reforms caused the partners to spend large sums in buying back their own land at public auctions, eventually holding nearly 30,000 hectares freehold. These purchases resulted in disagreements between them and the property was put up for auction in 1869 along with 63,622 sheep. "Advertising". The South Australian Advertiser. Vol. XII, no. 3425. South Australia. 7 October 1869. p. 4 – via National Library of Australia.

The new owners were R Boucher James (37.5%), Johnson Frederick Hayward (12.5%), and two new partners, William Sanders (25%) and John Benjamin Graham (25%). All were absentee investors and so Goode, who now had a family, remained as resident manager (until 1891). Their partnership was titled Sanders, James, & Co. In 1875 the partners purchased Curnamona (898 square km) and Billaroo Stations (590 square km). In 1880 the neighbouring Erudina Station was purchased and occupied by W H (Herb) Boucher James, a son of R Boucher James.

== The Thriving Canowie Estate ==
Together the partners survived drought and land resumption by the government. R Boucher James, as majority shareholder, was influential in the direction of the sheep, horse, and cattle studs, particularly in the importation of prize-winning bloodstock from England. The company’s Adelaide agents, the Rymill brothers, were also influential. Outstanding success was had with the Company's rams, which at the Royal Adelaide Show in 1911 won every prize in every category, a Royal Show record. Canowie stud rams were in demand throughout Australia and overseas.

In its heyday Canowie was a self-contained village, with stables, blacksmith, school, cemetery, eating house, and cart sheds. With over 40 permanent employees, plus their families, it had a 100-man shearers’ quarters, a 38 stand shearing shed, and its 65,000 sheep produced a wool clip of 1,752 bales. In 1894 the Canowie Pastoral Company was formed, with 2,160 shares allocated, capped to the original partnership percentages.

Canowie was renowned for its hospitality toward swagmen which in around 1903 provided over 2,000 sundowners each year with their customary two meals and a bed.

The manager from 1906 was Alexander McDonald who introduced Derrimut blood into their shorthorn cattle herd. Cattle from this herd fetched record prices at markets at the time.

By 1908 the Canowie Pastoral Company was the largest private freeholder of land in South Australia. The majority shareholder, R Boucher James, died in that year. To settle his estate, in 1910 the company began to sell off parcels of land with the last being sold in 1925, at which time the entire Canowie Merino Stud was also sold.

== Liquidation ==
Having sold off all its estates by 1925, the Company went into voluntary liquidation in 1926, the proceeds being dispersed to the descendants of the original four shareholders of 1869. The part of the property that remains is the original homestead complex surrounded by a mixed cropping and grazing farm now known as Old Canowie. A remaining shepherds hut, known as Coolootoo Hut, that is situated within the original property boundaries was placed on the South Australian Heritage Register in 2012.

== See also ==
- List of ranches and stations
