= Arthur Graham Rymill =

Australian businessman and powerboat racer

Arthur Graham Rymill (9 May 1868 – 10 September 1934) was a South Australian businessman and powerboat enthusiast.

== History ==
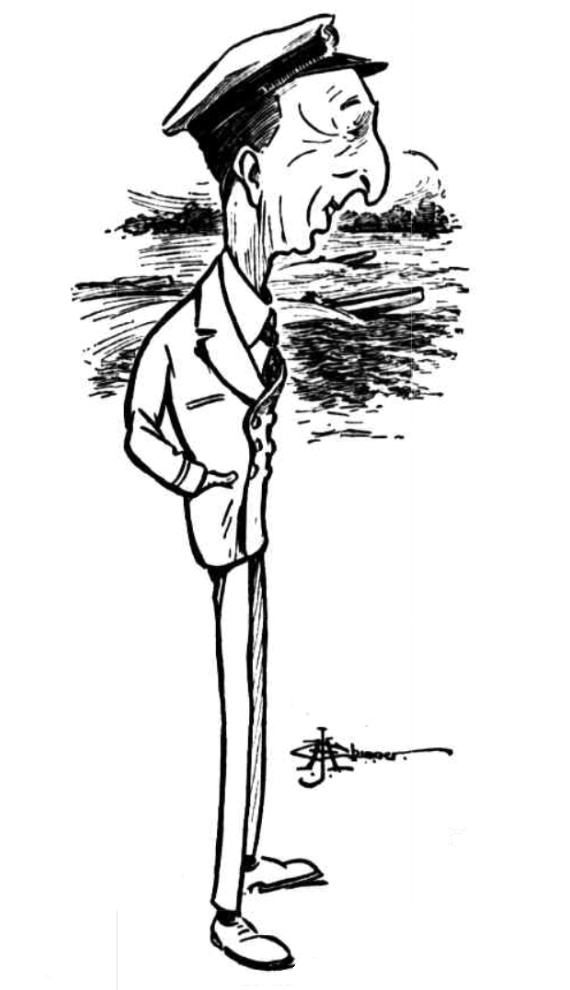
caricature by J. H. Chinner

Rymill was born on East Terrace, Adelaide, the third son of Henry Rymill (1836–1927) and Lucy Lockett Rymill née Baker (1839–1885).

He was educated at Prince Alfred College and Glenelg Grammar School, then started as a junior at the office of H. & F. Rymill. He gained pastoral experience in several sheep stations in the State's north-east — Curnamona, Baratta, and Winninie — in the years 1892–1897 before returning to the office. In 1910 he was appointed managing director and executor of Canowie Pastoral Company, one of the best-known stud sheep breeders in Australia, liquidated in 1925. He also had interests in the Olive Downs, Gnalta and Weinteriga stations in New South Wales.

He was a principal of H & F Rymill, a pastoral company founded by his father. He also served as director of several major South Australian companies:

- Bennett & Fisher
- Bank of Adelaide
- Holden
- Colton, Palmer & Preston
- Royal Insurance Company

== Other interests ==
With his brother Ernest Seymour Rymill, he owned and successfully raced several hydroplane speedboats named Tortoise with which they won the Australasian speed boat championship almost continuously for 18 years.

He collapsed and died of heart failure when presiding at a meeting of the Canowie Pastoral Co. at his office, in Pirie Chambers, Adelaide.

== Family ==
Rymill married Agnes Lucy Campbell (1 February 1886 – 22 August 1966) on 7 June 1905.

- (Sir) Arthur Campbell Rymill (8 Dec 1907 – 27 March 1989) married Margaret Earle Cudmore (daughter of Roland Cudmore) in 1934; they had two daughters.

See Henry Rymill for more members of this important South Australian family.
