= Alfred Richard Cecil Selwyn =

British geologist (1824–1902)

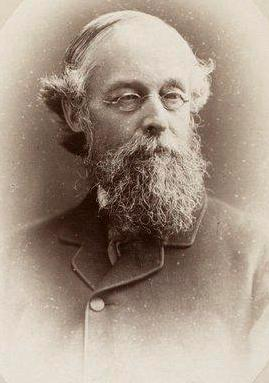
A.R.C.Selwyn

Alfred Richard Cecil Selwyn, CMG, LL.D, FRS, FGS (26 July 1824 – 19 October 1902) was a British geologist and public servant, director of the Geological Survey of Victoria from 1852 to 1869, director of the Geological Survey of Canada (GSC) from 1869 to 1894, and President of the Royal Society of Canada from 1895 to 1896.

== Early life ==
Selwyn was born in Kilmington, Somerset (now in Wiltshire), England, the son of the Rev. Townshend Selwyn (Canon of Gloucester Cathedral) and his wife, Charlotte Sophia, daughter of Lord George Murray, bishop of St Davids, Wales, and granddaughter of the fourth Duke of Athol.

Educated by private tutors at home and afterwards in Switzerland, where he became interested in geology, Selwyn joined the staff of the Geological Survey of Great Britain in 1845 under Sir Henry De la Beche and Sir A. C. Ramsay. Selwyn was engaged in the survey of North Wales and bordering portions of Shropshire, and a series of splendid geological maps resulted from his joint work with Ramsay and J. B. Jukes, earning a commendation from Ramsay. Selwyn was promoted to geologist on 1 January 1848.

== Australia ==
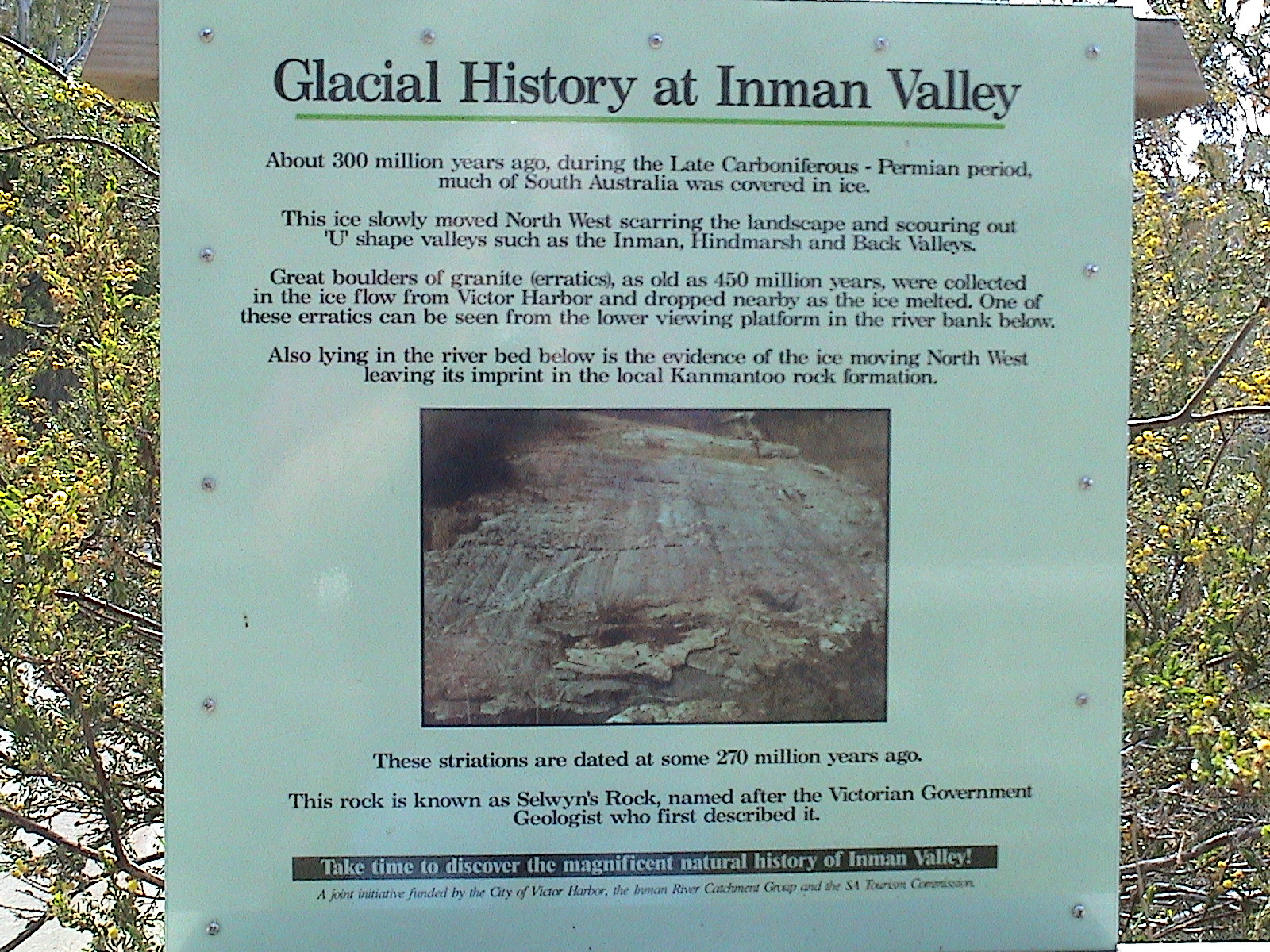
In 1859 Selwyn discovered a glacial pavement at Inman Valley, later dated to the Permian

In 1852 the Colonial Office appointed Selwyn director of the Geological Survey of the recently founded colony of Victoria, where he built up an excellent staff including Richard Daintree, C. D. H. Aplin, Charles Smith Wilkinson, Reginald Murray, Edward John Dunn, Henry Yorke Lyell Brown and Robert Etheridge, Junior, with Sir Frederick McCoy as palaeontologist. He was a strict disciplinarian and from the beginning set a very high standard of work in his department.

During his 17 years as director, over 60 geological maps were issued which were among the best of their period: they were models of accuracy which established a tradition of geological mapping in Australia. Selwyn was well qualified to analyse the Silurian strata. He was also responsible for several reports on the geology of Victoria and added much to the knowledge of gold-bearing rocks. Selwyn discovered the Caledonian goldfield near Melbourne in 1854 and in the following year reported on coal seams in Tasmania, until in 1869 the Colonial Legislature brought the Survey to an abrupt termination on economic grounds.

== Canada ==
In 1869 Sir William E. Logan retired as director of the Geological Survey of Canada and hand-picked his successor. Selwyn was his choice and took up his duties on 1 December 1869, but he faced a huge challenge: the geological mapping of the country as a task had grown tenfold due to the expanded size of Canada, stemming from Confederation in 1867, with more territories (Manitoba, British Columbia, and Prince Edward Island) added within the following decade.

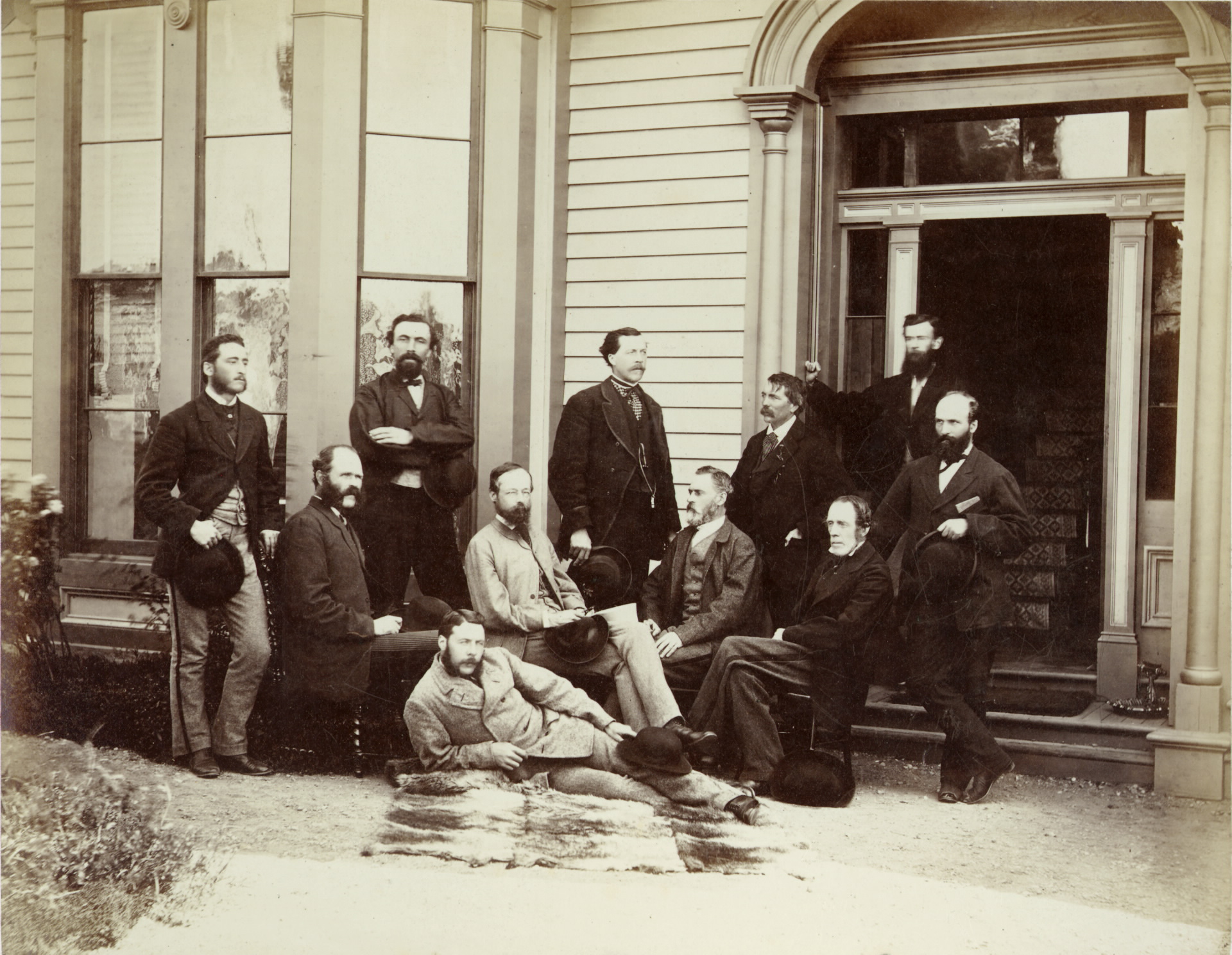
Selwyn (seated at centre) and his field party, during their 1871 survey of British Columbia

Selwyn's 25 years as director was a period of intense activity during which GSC geologists mounted expeditions to many parts of the newly added territories. Following in Logan's footsteps, Selwyn directed the GSC mainly from the field. As a student in Switzerland, he had become an accomplished mountain climber – a skill that proved invaluable to his extensive work in Canada's rugged new "Alpine province", British Columbia. As a condition of joining Canada in 1871, British Columbia had insisted on the construction of a railroad to link it to eastern Canada. In 1871 Selwyn, as his first task as Director of the Survey, mounted a particularly arduous expedition to investigate the geology and mineral resources along the proposed railroad routes.

Under Selwyn, there was a great surge of exploratory surveys, mainly in the west and the north. Fieldwork in remote uncharted wildernesses required superb frontier survival skills coupled with the scientific background necessary to record the geology, topography, the flora and fauna of the new lands being explored.

To carry out this far-ranging work, a larger staff was required, and with newly secured funding for the Survey from the government, Selwyn was able to build up his staff from six parties in the field in 1870 to fourteen in 1890. That same year, Parliament passed an act making the Geological Survey a separate department of the government, reporting to the Minister of the Interior. This was solid recognition of the Survey's growing importance to the expansion of Canada's economy.

Selwyn also faced the challenge of moving the headquarters of the Survey from its long-time home in Montreal (since 1842) to Ottawa in 1881. The move triggered a tremendous outcry in Montreal, with the main concern being the loss of the GSC's popular museum. It also involved a logistics challenge, given the weight and size of many of the rock, mineral and fossil specimens in the GSC collections. Selwyn reported in his 1881 summary report to parliament that the move had included "1,729 boxes; 101 barrels; 162 miscellaneous packages – gross weight 282,585 lbs".

In 1874 Selwyn was elected fellow of the Royal Society. In 1876 he was awarded the Murchison Medal of the Geological Society of London, and he was created CMG in 1886 for his distinguished work as assistant to the Canadian Commissioners at the exhibitions in Philadelphia (1876), Paris (1878) and London (1886). Selwyn was awarded the Clarke Medal by the Royal Society of New South Wales in 1884. In 1884, he wrote the Canadian portion of Edward Stanford's Compendium of Geography and Travel. Selwyn retired in 1894 to Vancouver, British Columbia, where he died on 19 October 1902.

Selwyn Rock (an exposed Permian glacial pavement) at Inman Valley in South Australia, Selwyn Range in the Canadian Rockies and in North West Queensland and Selwyn Street in Hackett, a suburb of the Australian Capital Territory, are named after him. Mount Selwyn in Victoria was named after him by the geologist Alfred Howitt.

Awards
Preceded by Ferdinand von Mueller	Clarke Medal; 1884	Succeeded by Joseph Dalton Hooker
Professional and academic associations
Preceded by James MacPherson Le Moine	President of the Royal Society of Canada; 1895–1896	Succeeded by Cornelius O'Brien
