= Henry Way Rymill =

Henry Way Rymill CBE

The Boy Scouts Association’s South Australian branch chief commissioner
- In office 1936–?

Henry Way Rymill CBE (9 October 1907 – 8 January 1971) was The Boy Scouts Association’s South Australian branch chief commissioner from 1936, and was the Royal South Australia Yacht Squadron’s commodore for six years.

The Boy Scouts Association awarded him its Silver Wolf Award in 1943. He was appointed a CBE in 1949.

He was the son of Herbert Lockett "Cargie" Rymill (19 August 1870 – 28 May 1951) and Shylie Katharine Blue (16 May 1882 – 3 April 1959). He married Alleyne Joan Downer (7 May 1906 – c. May 1942), daughter of James Frederick "Fred" Downer LLB (1874 – 29 May 1942) and Florence Way Downer, née Campbell, (1870 – c. 1861).
