= Arthur Rymill =

Australian politician

The Honourable Sir Arthur Rymill

Lord Mayor of Adelaide
- In office 1 July 1950 – 3 July 1954
- Preceded by: Arthur Short
- Succeeded by: John Philips

Member of the South Australian Legislative Council
- In office 15 February 1956 – 11 July 1975
- Preceded by: Sir James Sandford

Alderman of the City of Adelaide
- In office 1 December 1945 – 4 July 1954
- In office 2 December 1933 – 2 July 1938

Personal details
- Born: Arthur Campbell Rymill; 8 December 1907 North Adelaide, South Australia
- Died: 27 March 1989 (aged 81) Bedford Park, South Australia
- Party: Liberal and Country League
- Spouse: Margaret Cudmore (m.1934)

Sir Arthur Campbell Rymill (8 December 1907 – 27 March 1989) was a businessman, solicitor and Lord Mayor of Adelaide, South Australia.

== History ==
Born in Adelaide, the son of businessman Arthur Graham Rymill (9 May 1868 – 10 September 1934) and Agnes Lucy Rymill née Campbell (1 February 1886 – 22 August 1966), and grandson of Henry Rymill, Arthur was educated at Queen's School, St Peter's College and the University of Adelaide. He was admitted to the Bar in 1930.

First elected to the Adelaide City Council in 1933, Rymill represented Young Ward until 1937. In the next two years he was councillor for Robe ward. On 16 June 1940 he enlisted as a private in the 2/14th Field Regiment, 2nd AIF, and was commissioned as lieutenant on 1 January 1941. He was however injured in an Army vehicle accident (in Sydney according to one report), and was invalided out of the service in May. He returned to his practice and later served as a part-time Red Cross representative and with the Naval Auxiliary Patrol off the Outer Harbor.

He was elected to the MacDonnell ward of the Adelaide City Council in 1945 and held it until 1950, when he resigned to contest the Lord Mayoralty. He became, after Sir John Lavington Bonython, the youngest elected mayor of Adelaide, and served four terms in the position. Assisted by longtime (1947–1965) town clerk (and close friend) W. C. D. Veale, he commissioned significant improvements to the city's Parklands. He was, for a time, chairman of the City Council's parliamentary and by-laws committee.

== Politics ==
A lifelong supporter of the conservative wing of South Australia's Liberal and Country League, and diametrically opposed to the likes of Robin Millhouse and Steele Hall, he supported property enfranchisement qualification which applied in the State until (1970?), which meant that only landowners (and citizens with overseas war service) could vote in the Legislative Council. He was its deputy president, chairman of its finance committee, and its president (1953–1955).

He supported the Menzies government's 1951 referendum to ban the Communist Party of Australia.

He was elected unopposed in 1956 to the South Australian Legislative Council as a member for Central District No.2. and held the seat until 1975.

== Other interests ==
A. C. Rymill was a noted polo player, representing South Australia in interstate matches 1933–1951, including the Gold Cup tournament in Sydney in 1938.

He was a speedboat driver and won the 1933 Australasian hydroplane championship in his father's hydroplane Tortoise II against H. McEvoy's Cettein. The following year it sank in Outer Harbor when it "flipped" after reaching 70 miles an hour.

He was on the board of many companies:

- Chairman, Advertiser Newspapers Ltd 1980–83,
- Director, The Bank of Adelaide 1953–80 (Chairman 1953–79),
- Member of Principal Board, AMP Society 1964–1980,
- Director of Public Companies of South Australia,
- Director, Bennett and Fisher,
- Director, South Australian Brewing Company.

He held many public offices:

- First President, National Trust of SA,
- Vice-President, Australian Elizabethan Theatre Trust 1954–63,
- Member of foundation board of Adelaide Festival of Arts,
- Member of the Adelaide Children's Hospital board (Vice-President 1957–84).

He was a member of the Adelaide Club from 1929 (president 1979–1980) and a member of the Melbourne Club from 1956.

== Recognition ==
Arthur Campbell Rymill was knighted in 1954.

Adelaide's Rymill Park was named for him.

== Family ==
He married Margaret Earle Cudmore (8 August 1913 – ca.2004) on 27 December 1934. They had two daughters:

- Rosemary (ca.1937 – )
- Annabel (ca.1942 – )

Their home was 39 Brougham Place, North Adelaide. The house was built for A. G. Rymill in 1907. Now part of Lincoln College, the building is known as Whitehead and serves as the principal's residence.
