= William Sanders (pastoralist) =

Australian pastoralist and businessman (1801-1880)

William Sanders (5 August 1801 – 3 August 1880) was a pastoralist and businessman in South Australia.

== History ==
Sanders, born in Kinross, Scotland, migrated with his wife Harriet and three children to Adelaide on the Catherine Jamieson, arriving on 30 November 1838.

He acted as agent for an absentee landlord of a River Murray property, ran Norland Farm, Lyndoch to 1864 then in 1869 acquired an interest in Canowie station, near Hallett, in 1894 restructured as Canowie Pastoral Company. He also took up a share in Warcowie station, later transferred to sons James and Robert.

He was also a partner in the Hindley Street business of Miller Anderson. He built the residence "Waverly" (later "Waverley"), designed by James Macgeorge. later lived in Lixmount Cottage, Bristol Street, Glenelg.

He died suddenly on the train trip between Glenelg and the city. He left a substantial bequest towards construction of the Unitarian Christian Church building in Wakefield Street.

== Family ==
He was married to Harriet, née Carstairs (ca.1807 – 29 January 1894),

- James Carstairs Sanders (ca.1833 – 28 September 1898) married Emma Harriet McKinley in October 1869.

- William Blackwood Sanders (17 April 1875 – ) family historian.

- Robert Sanders (ca.1835 – 21 October 1902)
- Harriet Sanders married John L. Lyell, returned to Scotland.
- Anna Gall Sanders (4 August 1846 – 25 September 1930) married Frank Rymill (1837–1915) on 1 October 1868.
- Mary Frances?Francis? Saunders married John Cummins Morphett (1844–1936) on 11 March 1875.
