= Scouting and Guiding in South Australia =

Scouting in South Australia began in 1908.

In the early years of Scouting in South Australia, local Boy Scout patrols and troops formed independently and there were several separate central organisations including Boys' Brigade Scouts, Church Lads Brigade Scouts, Chums Scouts, British Boy Scouts, The Boy Scouts Association, Life-Saving Scouts of the Salvation Army and Methodist Boy Scouts.

Scouting in South Australia is now predominantly represented by Scouts Australia's South Australian Branch and the Girl Guides South Australia, a member organisation of Girl Guides Australia. There is representation by ethnic scout associations, some of which form the Ethnic Scouts and Guides of South Australia (ESGOSA) and, since 1984, representation by the Baden-Powell Scouts' Association.

== Scouts Australia South Australian Branch ==
South Australia
- Owner: Scouts Australia
- Headquarters: Scout Hall
- Location: 83 Greenhill Road Wayville South Australia 5034
- Country: Australia
- Founded: 1914
- Founder: The Boy Scouts Association of the United Kingdom
- Chief Scout: Her Excellency The Honorable Frances Adamson AC
- Chief Commissioner: John Clarke OAM
- Chief Executive Officer: James Sellers
- Website http://sa.scouts.com.au

Scouts Australia's South Australian Branch has 11 districts - Adelaide Foothills, Beadell, Heysen, Hills to Coast, Karkana, Limestone Coast, Mawson, Ridley, Three Rivers and Torrens. There are also Lone Scouts for youth too far away from a regular meeting place.

=== Facilities ===
- Woodhouse Adventure Park, Piccadilly - site of numerous Australian Scout Jamborees
- Roonka River Adventure Park - near Blanchetown, South Australia
- Camp Nyroca - Near Port Lincoln
- Glenelg Activities Centre
- Napperby Scout Camp, - Near Port Pirie
- Seahaven, Outer Harbor

=== Rovering ===
As of October 2024, there are 11 Rover Units (previously called Crews) in South Australia that run programs at the Unit and Branch level.

== Girl Guides Australia ==
Girl Guides SA operates three accommodation sites in South Australia, GTS Dolphin beachfront accommodation in Port Adelaide, Douglas Scrub campsite near McLaren Flat, and Tuckerway Hostel.

== Gang Shows and other theatrical experiences ==
There are a number of Gang Shows put on in South Australia. A Gang Show is a Scout variety show.

- Adelaide Gang Show - started in 1961. Early shows were directed by John Hardy and staged at Unley Town Hall. Radio 5AD produced LP recordings of several early shows as a commercial venture.
- Comedy Capers Gang Show - started in 1965, located in Northern Adelaide.
- Scouts Shouts Youth Theatre - started in 1973, located in Salisbury, South Australia.
- Carry On Guides - the only known all-Guide show worldwide, started in 1973, located in Northern Adelaide.
