= Abraham Scott =

Australian politician

Abraham Scott (ca.1817 – November 1903) was a businessman and politician in the early days of the colony of South Australia.

== History ==
Abraham, a brother of Henry Scott (1836–1913), was a son of Thomas Scott, of Boode House, near Braunton, in Devonshire, a member of an old Scottish family, and was educated in Bristol. He emigrated to South Australia and set up in business as a wool merchant. Around 1854 his brother Henry arrived and began working in his office, and took over the business around 1866.

He was a director of the National Bank of Australia and was elected to the South Australian Legislative Council in 1857. He was reelected but resigned in 1867 to return to London, where he served as director of the Bank of Adelaide and agent for Goldsbrough Mort & Co.

== Family ==
He married Eliza Georgina Gooch (died 21 June 1910), a daughter of Charles Gooch; they had a son Thomas. Both were living in England when he died. Thomas married Elizabeth Isabella Silver of Bewdley, Worcestershire, in Hampstead on 4 February 1875; he married Mary Isabella Strangways Wigley, daughter of W. R. Wigley of Glenelg on 24 November 1887.

(His brother Henry married Emily Gooch, also a daughter of Charles Gooch; his wife's death notice gave her name as Anne Scott Gooch.)
