= List of South Australian ministries =

This is a List of South Australian ministries representing the Government of South Australia. In South Australia, the cabinet is interchangeably known as the ministry as there is no "outer ministry" – therefore all ministers are in cabinet. Cabinets generally include the Premier of South Australia, the Deputy Premier of South Australia, the Attorney-General of South Australia, the Treasurer of South Australia, alongside ministers of specific portfolios.

Cabinets began with the 1st ministry led by B. T. Finniss, which commenced on 24 October 1856 with the introduction of responsible government in South Australia. The current 74th ministry is led by Peter Malinauskas of the South Australian Labor Party, and was formed on 21 March 2022.

== List ==
1. Finniss
2. Baker
3. Torrens
4. Hanson
5. Reynolds (1)
6. Reynolds (2)
7. Waterhouse (1)
8. Waterhouse (2)
9. Dutton (1)
10. Ayers (1)
11. Ayers (2)
12. Blyth (1)
13. Dutton (2)
14. Ayers (3)
15. Hart (1)
16. Boucaut (1)
17. Ayers (4)
18. Hart (2)
19. Ayers (5)
20. Strangways (1)
21. Strangways (2)
22. Hart (3)
23. Blyth (2)
24. Ayers (6)
25. Ayers (7)
26. Blyth (3)
27. Boucaut (2)
28. Boucaut (3)
29. Colton (1)
30. Boucaut (4)
31. Morgan
32. Bray
33. Colton (2)
34. Downer (1)
35. Playford II (1)
36. Cockburn
37. Playford II (2)
38. Holder (1)
39. Downer (2)
40. Kingston
41. Solomon
42. Holder (2)
43. Jenkins
44. Butler I
45. Price
46. Peake (1)
47. Verran
48. Peake (2)
49. Vaughan
50. Peake (3)
51. Barwell
52. Gunn
53. Hill (1)
54. Butler II (1)
55. Hill (2)
56. Richards
57. Butler II (2)
58. Playford IV (1)
59. Playford IV (2)
60. Walsh
61. Dunstan (1)
62. Hall
63. Dunstan (2)
64. Corcoran
65. Tonkin
66. Bannon
67. Arnold
68. Brown
69. Olsen
70. Kerin
71. Rann
72. Weatherill
73. Marshall
74. Malinauskas

== See also ==
- Department of the Premier and Cabinet (South Australia)
- Chief Secretary of South Australia
- Commissioner of Public Works (South Australia)
