= Electoral results for the district of Hindmarsh =

South Australian district election results

This is a list of election results for the electoral district of Hindmarsh in South Australian elections.

== Members for Hindmarsh ==
=== Legislative Council ===
Hindmarsh had earlier been the name of a different electoral district for the unicameral South Australian Legislative Council from 1851 until its abolition in 1857, Robert Davenport, then John Rankine being the members. That electorate had been for an area south of Adelaide including Strathalbyn.

Member	Term
Robert Davenport	1851–1854
John Rankine	1854–1857

=== House of Assembly ===
Member	Party	Term
John McInnes	Labor	1938–1950
Cyril Hutchens	Labor	1950–1970

== Election results ==
=== Elections in the 1960s ===
1968 South Australian state election: Hindmarsh
Party	Candidate	Votes	%	±%
Labor	Cyril Hutchens	14,874	72.2	−7.9
Liberal and Country	Richard Leeton	5,741	27.8	+27.8
Total formal votes		20,615	96.3	+1.6
Informal votes		796	3.7	−1.6
Turnout		21,411	95.1	+0.9
Labor hold		Swing	N/A	

1965 South Australian state election: Hindmarsh
Party	Candidate	Votes	%	±%
Labor	Cyril Hutchens	16,241	80.1	−19.9
Democratic Labor	Cyril Holasek	4,024	19.9	+19.9
Total formal votes		20,265	94.7	
Informal votes		1,136	5.3	
Turnout		21,401	94.2	
Labor hold		Swing	N/A	

1962 South Australian state election: Hindmarsh
Party	Candidate	Votes	%	±%
Labor	Cyril Hutchens	unopposed		
Labor hold		Swing		

=== Elections in the 1950s ===
1959 South Australian state election: Hindmarsh
Party	Candidate	Votes	%	±%
Labor	Cyril Hutchens	unopposed		
Labor hold		Swing		

1956 South Australian state election: Hindmarsh
Party	Candidate	Votes	%	±%
Labor	Cyril Hutchens	unopposed		
Labor hold		Swing		

1953 South Australian state election: Hindmarsh
Party	Candidate	Votes	%	±%
Labor	Cyril Hutchens	unopposed		
Labor hold		Swing		

1950 South Australian state election: Hindmarsh
Party	Candidate	Votes	%	±%
Labor	Cyril Hutchens	unopposed		
Labor hold		Swing		

=== Elections in the 1940s ===
1947 South Australian state election: Hindmarsh
Party	Candidate	Votes	%	±%
Labor	John McInnes	16,719	87.9	−12.1
Communist	James Moss	2,306	12.1	+12.1
Total formal votes		19,025	90.9	
Informal votes		1,911	9.1	
Turnout		20,936	92.1	
Labor hold		Swing	N/A	

1944 South Australian state election: Hindmarsh
Party	Candidate	Votes	%	±%
Labor	John McInnes	unopposed		
Labor hold		Swing		

1941 South Australian state election: Hindmarsh
Party	Candidate	Votes	%	±%
Labor	John McInnes	5,030	59.9	+7.2
Independent	William Stratton	2,047	24.4	+24.4
Independent	Bessie Mountford	1,318	15.7	+15.7
Total formal votes		8,395	97.4	−0.6
Informal votes		228	2.6	+0.6
Turnout		8,623	45.7	−8.5
Labor hold		Swing	N/A	

- Preferences were not distributed.

=== Elections in the 1930s ===
1938 South Australian state election: Hindmarsh
Party	Candidate	Votes	%	±%
Labor	John McInnes	4,920	52.7	
Independent	James Treloar	4,424	47.3	
Total formal votes		9,344	98.0	
Informal votes		188	2.0	
Turnout		9,532	54.2	
Labor hold		Swing		
