= Members of the South Australian Legislative Council, 1851–1855 =

This is a list of members of the South Australian Legislative Council from 1851 to 1855. Sixteen members were elected at the 1851 election with terms expiring in 1854. The four official (i.e. holding offices – front bench) members and four non-official members were nominated by the Governor on behalf of the Crown. Voting was voluntary and restricted to land-holding males. The first meeting was held on 28 August 1851 at the newly completed courthouse on Victoria Square. This council was dissolved by proclamation on 15 August 1855, and elections held for six city seats on 20 September and seven country seats on 21 September.

| Name | Seat | Notes |
|---|---|---|
| George Fife Angas | Elected for Barossa | |
| Charles Hervey Bagot | Elected for Light | resigned 7 July 1853, replaced by: John Tuthill Bagot 26 July 1853 |
| John Baker | Elected for Mount Barker | |
| Major Norman Campbell | Non-Official Nominee | resigned 16 Dec 1951, replaced by: George Anstey 17 Dec. 1851 – 25 August 1852; Frederick Dutton 25 August 1852 – 14 July 1853; Edward Stephens from 14 July 1853 |
| Robert Davenport | Elected for Hindmarsh | resigned 29 June 1854; Dr. John Rankine elected in August |
| Francis Dutton | Elected for East Adelaide | |
| Alexander Lang Elder | Elected for West Adelaide | resigned 30 March 1853, replaced by: James Hurtle Fisher 6 May 1853 – 24 October 1855 |
| John Ellis | Elected for Flinders | |
| Boyle Travers Finniss | Official Nominee (Registrar-General) | |
| William Giles | Elected for Yatala | |
| John Grainger | Non-Official Nominee | resigned 18 December 1854 |
| Edward Castres Gwynne | Non-Official Nominee | |
| George Hall | Elected for Port Adelaide | resigned 7 July 1853, replaced by William Scott 26 July 1853 |
| Richard Davies Hanson | Official Nominee (Advocate-General) | |
| Charles Simeon Hare | Elected for West Torrens | |
| John Hart | Elected for Victoria | resigned 7 July 1853, re-elected 7 July 1854 |
| George Kingston | Elected for The Burra | |
| John Morphett | Non-Official Nominee | |
| John Bentham Neales | Elected for North Adelaide | |
| William Peacock | Elected for Noarlunga | |
| Charles Sturt | Official Nominee (Colonial Secretary) | |
| Robert Richard Torrens | Official Nominee (Collector of Customs) | |
| George Waterhouse | Elected for East Torrens | resigned 3 June 1854, replaced by: Charles Fenn 27 June 1854 |
| William Younghusband | Elected for Stanley | |
