= Members of the South Australian Legislative Council, 1855–1857 =

This is a list of members of the South Australian Legislative Council from 1855 to 1857. Sixteen members were elected at the 1855 election with terms due to expire in 1858. The four Official (i.e. holding offices – front bench) Nominees and four Non-Official Nominees were appointed by the Governor on behalf of the Crown. Voting was voluntary and restricted to land-holding males. This Council formulated a State Constitution and was prorogued to make way for the bicameral system brought about by this Constitution.

Name	Seat	Notes
George Fife Angas	Elected for Barossa	reelected (defeated Rodda)
John Tuthill Bagot	Elected for Light	uncontested
John Baker	Elected for Mount Barker	uncontested
Arthur Blyth	Elected for Yatala	defeated Duffield
Samuel Davenport	Non-Official Nominee	
Francis Stacker Dutton	Elected for East Adelaide	uncontested
Boyle Travers Finniss	Official Nominee (Colonial Secretary)	
James Hurtle Fisher	Non-Official Nominee	
Anthony Forster	Elected for West Adelaide	defeated Fisher
Arthur Henry Freeling R.E.	Official Nominee (Surveyor-General)	
Richard Davies Hanson	Official Nominee (Advocate-General)	
John Hart	Elected for Victoria	uncontested
John Bristow Hughes	Elected for East Torrens	defeated Gwynne
George Strickland Kingston	Elected for The Burra	reelected (defeated Mildred)
Marshall MacDermott	Non-Official Nominee	
John Bentham Neales	Elected for North Adelaide	reelected
William Peacock	Elected for Noarlunga	reelected (defeated MacDermott)
Dr. John Rankine	Elected for Hindmarsh	reelected (defeated Stirling)
Thomas Reynolds	Elected for West Torrens	defeated O'Halloran
William Scott	Elected for Port Adelaide	uncontested
Edward Stirling	Non-Official Nominee	
Robert Richard Torrens	Official Nominee (Colonial Treasurer)	
Alfred Watts	Elected for Flinders	defeated Smith
William Younghusband	Elected for Stanley	reelected (defeated Cumming)
