= Robert Davenport =

Robert Davenport may refer to:

- Robert Davenport (dramatist) (fl. 1623–1639), English dramatist
- Robert Davenport (Australian politician) (1816–1896), pioneer and politician in the Colony of South Australia
- Robert Davenport (cricketer) (1852–1934), New Zealand cricketer
- Robert Davenport (Royal Navy officer) (1882–1965), Commander-in-Chief, Coast of Scotland
- Robert Davenport (Family Affairs), a character from the British soap opera Family Affairs

== See also ==
- Bob Davenport (disambiguation)
