= Julia Holder =

Australian philanthropist, stateswoman and suffragist

Lady Julia Holder
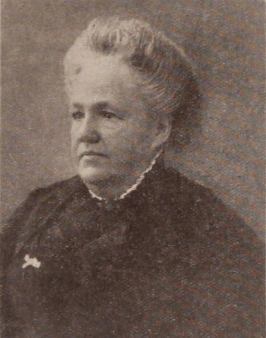

President Australian Woman’s Christian Temperance Union
- In office 1912–1921

President South Australian Woman’s Christian Temperance Union
- In office 1902–1906

Personal details
- Born: 6 July 1856 Burra, South Australia
- Died: 19 May 1941 (aged 84) St Peters, South Australia
- Spouse: Frederick Holder

Lady Julia Maria Holder (née Stephens; 6 July 1856 – 19 May 1941) was an Australian philanthropist, stateswoman and suffragist.

== Life ==
Julia grew up in Burra, the daughter of John Riccardo Stephens, a Cornishman, homeopathic doctor, farmer, teacher, and shopkeeper who had studied for the Methodist ministry. On 29 March 1877, at Burra, Holder married Frederick Holder, who was later a state and federal Member of Parliament, Premier of South Australia and first Speaker of the Australian Parliament.

=== Public life and social activism ===
Lady Holder was president of many public bodies in Adelaide. Holder was the National President (1912–1921) and South Australian State President (1902–1906) of the Australian Woman's Christian Temperance Union and a National President of the National Council of Women of Australia. Holder represented Australia at several WCTU world conferences, including the 1913 New York and the 1920 London.

=== Death of husband ===
On 23 July 1909, her husband Frederick presided over the Australian Parliament in Melbourne, where he suffered a seizure in the House, later diagnosed with a cerebral hemorrhage, and died that same day. Holder was told the news via telegram in Adelaide and took the afternoon express train from Adelaide to Melbourne as Holder wanted to ensure her husband’s body was returned to South Australia for burial, where he was granted a state funeral, which took place in Adelaide.

== Family ==
Holder and her husband Frederick had four sons and three daughters:

- Ethel Roby Holder MA (1878– )
- Rhoda Sims Holder (1880– )
- Frederick Stephens Holder (1882– )
- Winifred Breakspeare Holder (1886– )
- Evan Morecott Holder (1888– )
- Sydney Ernest Holder (1890– )
- Ruth Eliza Holder (1892– )
- Ida Margaret Holder (1894– )
