= Second Waterhouse ministry =

The Second Waterhouse ministry was the 8th ministry of the Government of South Australia, led by George Waterhouse. It commenced on 17 October 1861, when George Waterhouse, who had led a nine-day temporary ministry to deal with dissident judge Benjamin Boothby, won support to remain Premier with a reconstituted ministry. The ministry resigned in July 1863 after nearly being defeated on a budget motion, passing only with the Speaker's casting vote on a procedural basis. It was succeeded on 4 July by the First Dutton ministry, another temporary ministry headed by Francis Dutton, who had moved the vote to bring down the Waterhouse ministry.

Office	Minister
Premier; Chief Secretary	George Waterhouse MLC
Attorney-General	Randolph Isham Stow MHA
Treasurer	Thomas Reynolds MHA (until 19 February 1862)
Commissioner of Crown Lands and Immigration	Henry Strangways MHA
Commissioner of Public Works	John Lindsay MHA (until 19 February 1862)
Treasurer	Arthur Blyth MHA (from 19 February 1862)
Commissioner of Public Works	William Milne MHA (from 19 February 1862)
