= John Grainger (politician) =

Australian politician

John Grainger MLC

Member of the South Australian Legislative Council
- In office February 1851 – December 1854

Personal details
- Born: c. 1803
- Died: 5 December 1872 (aged 68–69)
- Relatives: (Henry) Allerdale Grainger (nephew)

John Grainger (c. 1803 – 5 December 1872) was an English real estate investor and member of the South Australian Legislative Council from February 1851 to December 1854.

== History ==
He may have been the John Grainger who arrived in SA in September 1841 aboard the Lady Emma from Launceston.

He was a significant buyer of land in South Australia, particularly in the Mitcham and Goolwa areas. He was, with Edward Stephens, C. H. Bagot, G. Tinline, G. F. Aston and others, investors ("The Nobs") in the "Princess Royal mine" of Burra, South Australia, which was never profitable, by contrast with the adjoining "Monster Mine" of the South Australian Mining Association ("Snobs") that repaid its investors handsomely.

He purchased sections 1004 and 1287 in the Brownhill Creek region close to the old Mount Barker Road, where a small but profitable silver/lead/bismuth mine "Grainger Wheal" (or "Wheal Grainger") was established in 1848.

He was appointed Justice of the Peace in August 1850, then nominated for the Adelaide No. 7, (West Torrens) ward in the part-elected Legislative Council of 1851, but lost to Charles Simeon Hare. He subsequently accepted an appointment, along with Edward Castres Gwynne, John Morphett and Major Norman Campbell as a non-official (i.e. without portfolio) member.

Granger and Alexander Elder (brother of Thomas Elder) were aboard the Government schooner Yatala, captained by Edward Dowsett, on 24 May 1852 when they discovered the natural harbour which they named Port Augusta.

He left the colony some time before December 1856, and was named, along with George Morphett, James Philcox, Edmund Trimmer, and George Aston by one Adelaide newspaper in an article condemning certain land speculators for underhand practices, including conspiring to purchase Government land at less than market prices.

His home from 1849 to 1853 was "Gable Ends", now at 27 Carrick Hill Drive, Mitcham. His last home was at 5 Sewerby Terrace, Bridlington, England.

== Family ==
Little information is readily available. There are many references in the newspapers between 1843 and 1848 to a John Grainger, jun. of Springfield (which may be "Gable Ends"), who purchased town acre 717 on Kermode Street, North Adelaide, sat on a jury, and on the board of the "Princess Royal" mine. It is not even certain that he is a separate person, as the two names do not appear together.

(Henry) Allerdale Grainger (7 August 1848 – 17 December 1923), who sat in the Legislative Assembly for Wallaroo 1884–1885 and 1890–1901, was a nephew, not a son as sometimes asserted. His father (John's eldest brother) Henry Grainger (1 April 1801 – 24 November 1899) was the absentee landholder of several Adelaide properties, and had the largest stake in the Princess Royal Mine, Burra.
