= Hanson ministry =

- 4th Cabinet of the Colony of South Australia

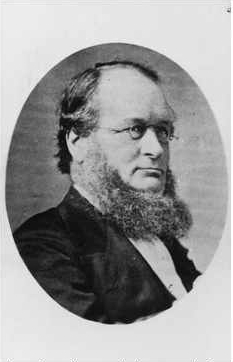
- Premier Richard Hanson (c. 1880)
- Date formed: 30 September 1857
- Date dissolved: 9 May 1860

People and organisations
- Monarch: Queen Victoria
- Governor: Sir Richard MacDonnell
- Premier: Richard Hanson
- No. of ministers: 6
- Member party: unaligned
- Status in legislature: Minority Government
- Opposition party: unaligned

History
- Predecessor: Torrens ministry
- Successor: Reynolds ministry I

The Hanson ministry was the 4th ministry of the Government of South Australia, led by Premier Richard Hanson. It commenced on 30 September 1857 with the defeat of the Torrens ministry on the floor of the House of Assembly. Hanson's government was the longest lasting at this point, surviving until 9 May 1860, a total of 2 years, 222 days. It fell after losing a confidence vote, and was replaced by Thomas Reynolds' First ministry.

Hanson's ministry was the first in South Australia to include a former Premier, Boyle Finniss.

== Composition of ministry ==
Portfolio	Minister	Term commence	Term end	Term of office
Premier; Attorney-General	Hon. Richard Hanson MHA	30 September 1857	9 May 1860	952 days
Chief Secretary	Hon. William Younghusband MLC	30 September 1857	9 May 1860	952 days
Colonial Treasurer	Hon. Capt. John Hart MHA	30 September 1857	12 June 1858	255 days
Colonial Treasurer	Hon. Boyle Finniss MHA	12 June 1858	9 May 1860	820 days
Commissioner of Crown Lands and Immigration	Hon. Francis Dutton MHA	30 September 1857	2 June 1859	709 days
Commissioner of Crown Lands and Immigration	Hon. John Neales MHA	2 June 1859	5 July 1859	33 days
Commissioner of Crown Lands and Immigration	Hon. William Milne MHA	5 July 1859	9 May 1860	309 days
Commissioner of Public Works	Hon. Thomas Reynolds MHA	30 September 1857	12 June 1858	255 days
Commissioner of Public Works	Hon. Arthur Blyth MHA	12 June 1858	9 May 1860	697 days
