= 1851 South Australian colonial election =

- July 1851

16 of 24 seats in the South Australian Legislative Council.

Colonial elections were held in South Australia throughout July 1851, after the publishing of the election ordinances on 21 February 1851. Only 16 of the 24 seats in the unicameral Legislative Council were popularly elected but was the first occurrence of voting franchise in the colony. The 1855 election was the second and last of this type. The 1857 election was the first contest which popularly elected all members to the new bicameral Parliament of South Australia.

The first six Governors of South Australia oversaw governance from proclamation in 1836 until self-government in 1857.

== See also ==
- Members of the South Australian Legislative Council, 1851–1855
- Members of the South Australian Legislative Council, 1843–1851
- Members of the South Australian Legislative Council, 1836–1843
