= Second Reynolds ministry =

The Second Reynolds ministry was the 6th ministry of the Government of South Australia, led by Thomas Reynolds. It commenced on 20 May 1861, when Reynolds succeeded in reconstituting his ministry and retaining power after the defeat of the First Reynolds ministry. The ministry resigned in October 1861 when Reynolds was unable to reconstruct a ministry following the resignation of John Morphett as Chief Secretary. It was succeeded by the First Waterhouse ministry, which was specifically constructed as a short-term ministry to deal with the matter of dissident Judge Benjamin Boothby, on 8 October.

Office	Minister
Premier; Treasurer	Thomas Reynolds MHA
Chief Secretary	John Morphett MLC
Attorney-General	Randolph Isham Stow MHA
Commissioner of Crown Lands and Immigration	Henry Strangways MHA
Commissioner of Public Works	Alexander Hay MHA
