= John Riccardo Stephens =

John Riccardo Stephens (11 Oct 1827 – 2 September 1912) was a pioneering teacher, preacher and medical doctor in South Australia. His middle name is frequently rendered as "Ricardo".

== History ==
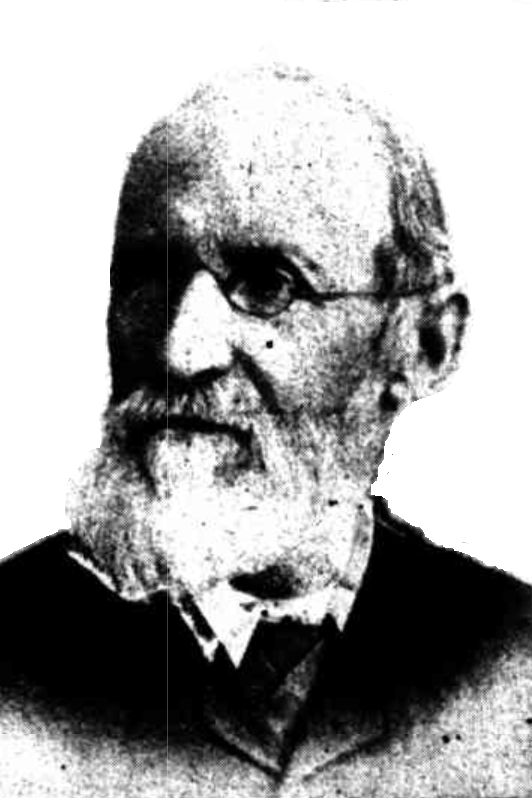
J. R. Stephens

Stephens was born in St Agnes, Cornwall, and was taken at an early age by his parents to New Brunswick, Canada, then in 1831 to Bermuda, where he was educated, strongly influenced by the preacher J. B. Brown, then became himself a teacher and preacher at the time of emancipation of the slaves. In 1850, at age 23, he left for Australia with the rush to the Victorian gold diggings, but had no luck and shortly returned to England. In 1853 he returned to Australia as chaplain on the emigrant ship Ramillies, landing in Adelaide, and through Rev. J. D. Draper secured a position with the school at One Tree Hill, taking Sunday services at the schoolhouse, while his wife ran a Sunday School. He also preached in the North Adelaide and Gawler circuits. Two years later he took charge of a school at Burra. As he had some knowledge of medicine, his services were much sought by residents of the district. This led him in 1874 to leave for America to gain medical qualifications. Eventually he returned to South Australia, taking up land at Hallett, then moved to Gumeracha, where he remained, practising as a physician for 20 years. He was particularly knowledgeable with childhood illnesses, but was also a useful veterinary surgeon.

== Other interests ==
He claimed to have established South Australia's first literary society at One Tree Hill in 1854; Arthur Blyth (later Sir Arthur) was its first president. He formed a young men's literary society in Gumeracha in the early 1900s.

He was a capable preacher, a prominent Methodist, but able to fill the Baptists' pulpit when necessary. His eyesight failed in the last years of his life,

== Family ==
Stephens married Eliza Sims on 27 December 1853

- Julia Maria Stephens (6 July 1856 – 19 May 1941) married Frederick Holder on 29 March 1877
- Louisa Wilson Stephens (1857 – 4 June 1913) married G. F. Nepean Smith
- Horace Steel Stephens (1861 – 11 April 1930) His middle name is frequently rendered "Steele".
- Lilian Bruse Stephens (4 January 1865 – ) married F. W. Clifford Catt on 22 August 1888

He married again, to Mary Jane (c. 1846 – 18 June 1927) in 1888

== Reminiscences ==
"When I first arrived in Adelaide I received a cordial Welcome from the Revs. T. T. N. Hall and D. J. Draper. I was placed on the South Adelaide Circuit plan with my name immediately below that of the late Mr James Scott. Pirie Street, Methodist Church had just been opened. Ministers and other labourers were few, and in almost my first quarterly meeting a desire was manifested to see a revival of the work. A circular was prepared and distributed around the city announcing a series of special services. The Rev. Joseph Dare, then labouring at Mount Barker was invited to conduct them. They were attended with splendid results. The appointments of that time were all performed on foot, and extended to Montacute, Mitcham, Brighton, Fulham, and Plympton. At Brighton Father Edwards used to meet us at the Forest Inn, and bring us back again after the evening service. For the Montacute service we were sometimes allowed a horse. On one occasion I walked from Mount Barker on Saturday to fill my appointment at Mitcham on the following day. I used to go to Mount Barker to supply for Mr Dare when he was engaged in the city with special services. When I went to Onetree Hill a day school and religious services were arranged for at Precolumb. We gathered a good congregation on January 1, 1854, composed of persons of various denominations. I was practically a home missionary. I secured the services of the Rev. W. Hill, of Gawler, to administer the sacraments. The cause thus begun resulted ultimately in the establishment of the present Onetree Hill Church. After two years' labour I received a call to take charge of the Wesleyan day school at the Burra, and immediately associated myself with religious work in that circuit. The Burra circuit then embraced Ulooloo, 25 miles away, also Canowie, 35 miles. These two services were conducted by the same preacher on the one Sabbath, the former in the afternoon and the latter in the evening, so that he got back to Burra by 7 a.m. the next day. The opening of a church at Terowie was due to Dr Torr, who as teacher at Ulooloo was enabled to extend his labours further north. Having studied medicine in my youth with a view to become a medical missionary, circumstances rendered it necessary, to use that knowledge for the benefit of the public, and resulted in my visiting America in 1875 to complete, my medical education. Shortly after my return I removed to Mongalata, which at that time was opened for settlement. Brother J. Paull and my self conducted services there in my barn for several years. In 1892 I settled in Gumeracha."
