= Torrens ministry =

The Torrens ministry was the 3rd Ministry of the Government of South Australia, led by Robert Torrens. It commenced on 1 September 1857 following the defeat of the Baker ministry in the House of Assembly, and was succeeded by the Hanson ministry on 30 September when they were themselves defeated in the House. At 29 days in office, it was one of the shortest ministries in the history of South Australia.

Office	Minister
Premier; Chief Secretary	Robert Torrens MHA
Attorney-General	Richard Bullock Andrews MHA
Treasurer	John Bristow Hughes MHA
Commissioner of Crown Lands and Immigration	Marshall MacDermott MHA
Commissioner of Public Works	Samuel Davenport MLC
