= First Ayers ministry =

The First Ayers ministry was the 10th ministry of the Government of South Australia, led by Henry Ayers. It commenced on 15 July 1863, when Ayers won support to form a ministry after the collapse of the First Dutton ministry. In July 1864, the ministry was defeated on a motion of no confidence, but his opponents were unable to form government, and Ayers was sworn in heading the reconstituted Second Ayers ministry on 22 July 1864.

Office	Minister
Premier; Chief Secretary	Henry Ayers MLC
Attorney-General	Richard Bullock Andrews MHA
Treasurer	John Hart MHA
Commissioner of Crown Lands and Immigration	Lavington Glyde MHA
Commissioner of Public Works	Philip Santo MHA
