= Solomon ministry =

The Solomon ministry was the 41st ministry of the Government of South Australia, led by Vaiben Louis Solomon. It commenced on 1 December 1899, following the defeat of the Kingston ministry over proposed extensions to suffrage, but lasted only a week before it was ousted in favour of the new Leader of the Opposition, Frederick Holder, who formed the second Holder ministry on 8 December 1899. It was the shortest-lived ministry in the history of South Australia.

Office	Minister
Premier; Treasurer	Vaiben Louis Solomon MHA
Chief Secretary	Lancelot Stirling MLC
Attorney-General	Paddy Glynn MHA
Commissioner of Crown Lands	Alexander Poynton MHA
Commissioner of Public Works	Ben Rounsevell MHA
Minister of Education and Agriculture	Thomas Burgoyne MHA
