= Bob Davenport =

Bob Davenport may refer to:

- Bob Davenport (gridiron football) (1933–2024), American football player and coach
- Bob Davenport (singer) (1932–2026), English traditional folk singer

== See also ==
- Robert Davenport (disambiguation)
