= 1855 South Australian colonial election =

| ← 1851 | 20/21 September 1855 | 1857 → |

16 of 24 seats in the South Australian Legislative Council.

Colonial elections were held in South Australia on 20/21 September 1855. Only 16 of the 24 seats in the unicameral Legislative Council were popularly elected, the second occurrence of voting franchise in the colony. The 1851 election was the first of this type.

The election resulted in violence on 20 September 1855 in Hindley Street between opponents and supporters of Anthony Forster, editor and part-owner of the South Australian Register and also one of the candidates for election. A consequence of the violence was the introduction of secret ballots from the following election.

The 1857 election was the first contest which popularly elected all members to the new bicameral Parliament of South Australia.

The first six Governors of South Australia oversaw governance from proclamation in 1836 until self-government in 1857.

== See also ==
- Members of the South Australian Legislative Council, 1855–1857
