= First Blyth ministry =

The First Blyth ministry was the 12th ministry of the Government of South Australia, led by Arthur Blyth. It commenced on 4 August 1864, when Blyth succeeded in forming a ministry following the resignation of the Second Ayers ministry. It was succeeded by the Second Dutton ministry on 22 March 1865, when Francis Dutton won the support of the new parliament that had been elected at the 1865 election.

Office	Minister
Premier; Commissioner of Crown Lands and Immigration	Arthur Blyth MHA
Chief Secretary	Henry Ayers MLC
Attorney-General	Randolph Isham Stow MHA
Treasurer	John Hart MHA
Commissioner of Public Works	William Milne MHA
