= Robert Davenport (cricketer) =

New Zealand cricketer

Personal information
- Full name: Robert Noel Davenport
- Born: 26 November 1852; Adelaide, Colony of South Australia
- Died: 22 December 1934 (aged 82); Port Elliott, South Australia
- Role: Batsman

Domestic team information
- Years: Team
- 1881/82–1883/84: Otago
- Source: ESPNcricinfo, 8 May 2016

Robert Noel Davenport (26 November 1852 – 22 December 1934) was a New Zealand cricketer. He played two first-class matches for Otago, one in each of the 1881–82 and 1883–84 seasons.

Robert Noel Davenport was born at Adelaide in 1852. He was the son of Robert Davenport, a pioneer and politician in the early days of the Colony of South Australia. His uncle, Samuel Davenport, was also an early pioneer, the brothers having arrived in Australia in 1843. Davenport was educated at St Peter's College in Adelaide and then in England at Mill Hill School. He worked for the National Bank of Australasia before farming in Queensland.

As a young man, Davenport was considered a "brilliant athlete" and a "well-known cricketer". He played against a touring English side led by WG Grace at Melbourne and played club cricket in New Zealand for Phoenix Cricket Club in Dunedin. He was described in January 1882 by the Otago Daily Times as a "high order" batsman with "the strongest defence" who was also "an excellent field". The paper went on to suggest that "as an all-round player, in short, he cannot be far off being the best man in the Southern Province". He played for an Otago XI against a visiting English team led by Alfred Shaw later in the month and in February played the first of his two first-class matches, playing against Canterbury in Otago's only first-class match of the season. He played again for the province in February 1884, this time against a touring Tasmanian side. He scored a total of 54 first-class runs, with a highest score of 38 not out scored against Tasmania.

Davenport lived at Port Elliot with his wife in a home which had been established by his father. The couple had no children. He died in 1934 aged 82.
