= First Holder ministry =

The First Holder ministry was the 38th ministry of the Government of South Australia. It commenced on 21 June 1892, when Frederick Holder succeeded in forming a government after the second Playford ministry lost a confidence vote in parliament. It was succeeded by the second Downer ministry on 15 October 1892, after Holder himself lost a confidence vote. Lasting for only 116 days, it was one of the shortest ministries in South Australia.

Office	Minister
Premier; Treasurer	Frederick Holder MHA
Chief Secretary	John Cockburn MHA
Attorney-General	William Frederick Stock MLC
Commissioner of Crown Lands and Immigration	Peter Paul Gillen MHA
Commissioner of Public Works	Andrew Dods Handyside MHA
Minister of Education	John Hannah Gordon MHA
