= John Rowe (Australian politician) =

Australian politician

John Rowe (1816 – 17 Dec 1886) was a mineral assayer and mine manager who had a brief spell as member of South Australian parliament.

He was born at St Agnes, Cornwall, and emigrated with his wife to South Australia on the David Malcolm, arriving in Adelaide on 23 January 1847, and advertised his availability as a "practical assayer". In 1849 they settled in Kapunda, where he worked as an assayer. In 1859 he was appointed manager of the Mochatoona copper mine, near Angepena Station in the Flinders Ranges, but left in mid-1860 after criticism by the board, compounded by the difficulty of transporting the ore to Port Augusta, and returned to Kapunda.

In 1862 he was elected to the seat of Light in the House of Assembly to fill the casual vacancy opened when F. S. Dutton was appointed Agent-General, and sat from May 1862 to November 1862, when Parliament was dissolved. He did not seek re-election.

He moved to Thames, New Zealand in 1869 where he joined his brothers William Rowe (MHR for Thames) and Abel Rowe, there he was advertising himself as a Practical Mining Manager and Assayer in February 1870. By 1872 he was in Sydney, again advertising himself. In December of that year and was appointed Manager of the Edina Mine in Queensland. He returned again to Kapunda.

He died of a heart attack shortly after assisting in the local mayoral election.

== Family ==
John Rowe married Eliza Richards ( – 5 April 1893) on 20 August 1846; they had three sons and one daughter:

- John Rowe (11 August 1848 – ) married Emma Bosher on 24 May 1879, of Goodwood
- James Richard Rowe (10 May 1853 – ) married Elizabeth (c. 1856 – 3 September 1936), lived at Morgan, then Mile End
- Elizabeth Rowe (30 July 1855 – ) married Charles Luscombe Chapple (c. 1849 – 23 June 1922) on 29 March 1875, of Hergott
- Samuel Rowe (16 February 1857 – )
