= Finniss ministry =

1st ministry of government of South Australia

- 1st ministry of South Australia

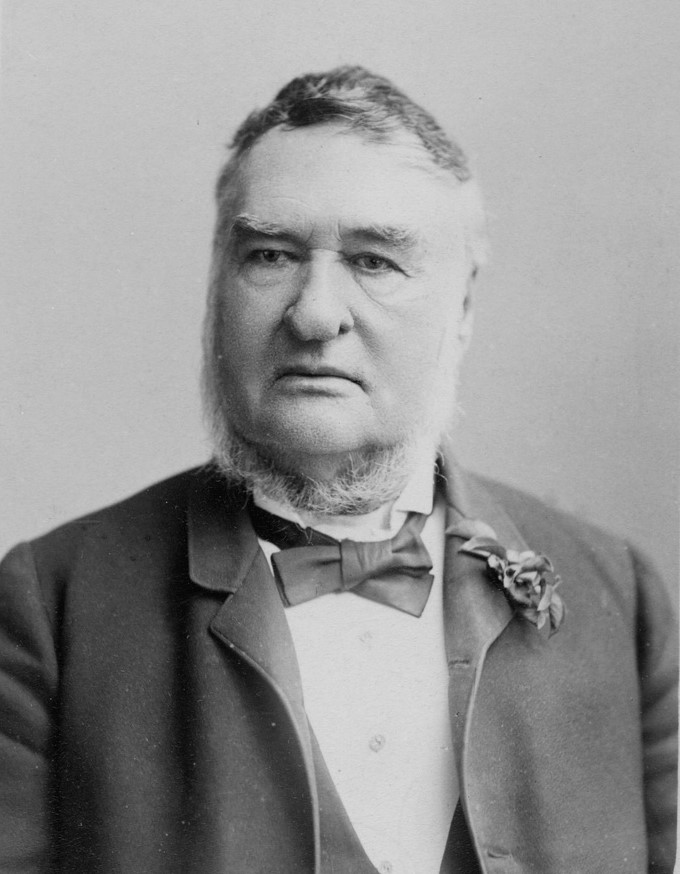
- Boyle Finniss
- Date formed: 24 October 1856
- Date dissolved: 21 August 1857

People and organisations
- Monarch: Queen Victoria
- Governor: Richard Graves MacDonnell
- Premier: Boyle Travers Finniss
- No. of ministers: 5
- Member party: Non-partisan
- Status in legislature: Minority government

History
- Outgoing election: 9 March 1857
- Successor: Baker ministry

The Finniss ministry was the first ministry of the Government of South Australia. It was led by the state's first Premier, Boyle Travers Finniss. The Finniss ministry commenced on 24 October 1856 with the introduction of responsible government in South Australia, with Finniss being nominated as Premier by Governor Richard Graves MacDonnell.

It was succeeded by the Baker ministry on 21 August 1857.

== Cabinet ==
Party	Portrait	Minister	Portfolio
Independent		Boyle Travers Finniss (1807–1893) MHA for City of Adelaide (1857–1860)	Premier; Chief Secretary
Independent		Richard Davies Hanson (1805–1876) MHA for City of Adelaide (1857–1861)	Attorney-General
Independent		Robert Richard Torrens (1812–1884) MHA for City of Adelaide (1857–1858)	Treasurer
Independent		Charles Bonney (1813–1897) MHA for East Torrens (1857–1858)	Commissioner of Crown Lands and Immigration
Independent		Arthur Henry Freeling (1820–1885) MLC (1857–1859)	Commissioner of Public Works (until 20 March 1857)
Independent		Samuel Davenport (1818–1906) MLC (1857–1866)	Commissioner of Public Works (from 20 March 1857)
