= Electoral district of Hindmarsh =

Former South Australian state electoral district

Coordinates: 34°53′42″S 138°32′46″E

Hindmarsh South Australia—House of Assembly
- State: South Australia
- Created: 1938
- Abolished: 1970
- Namesake: John Hindmarsh
- Demographic: Metropolitan

Hindmarsh was an electoral district of the House of Assembly in the Australian state of South Australia from 1938 to 1970. It was in the northwestern suburbs of Adelaide.

Its boundaries were described in 1955 as follows:

Commencing at the intersection of Findon Road with River Torrens; northerly along Findon Road; westerly along Trimmer Parade; north-easterly along Woodville and Henley Beach Railway; to the north-eastern boundary of Port Road; southeasterly along said boundary; north-easterly along the north-western boundary of preliminary section 376, Hundred of Yatala; south-easterly along Torrens Road; northerly along Days Road; easterly along the northern boundaries of section 394 and 377; southerly along Churchill Road; south-easterly along Torrens Road; south-westerly along Park Terrace; thence generally westerly along the River Torrens to the point of commencement.

Hindmarsh was abolished in a boundary redistribution in 1970.

The suburb of Hindmarsh is currently located in the safe Labor seat of Croydon.

== Members ==
=== Legislative Council ===
Hindmarsh had earlier been the name of a different electoral district for the unicameral South Australian Legislative Council from 1851 until its abolition in 1857, Robert Davenport, then John Rankine being the members. That electorate had been for an area south of Adelaide including Strathalbyn.

Member	Term
Robert Davenport	1851–1854
John Rankine	1854–1857

=== House of Assembly ===
Member	Party	Term
John McInnes	Labor	1938–1950
Cyril Hutchens	Labor	1950–1970
