= John Tuthill Bagot =

Irish-born South Australian politician

John Bagot
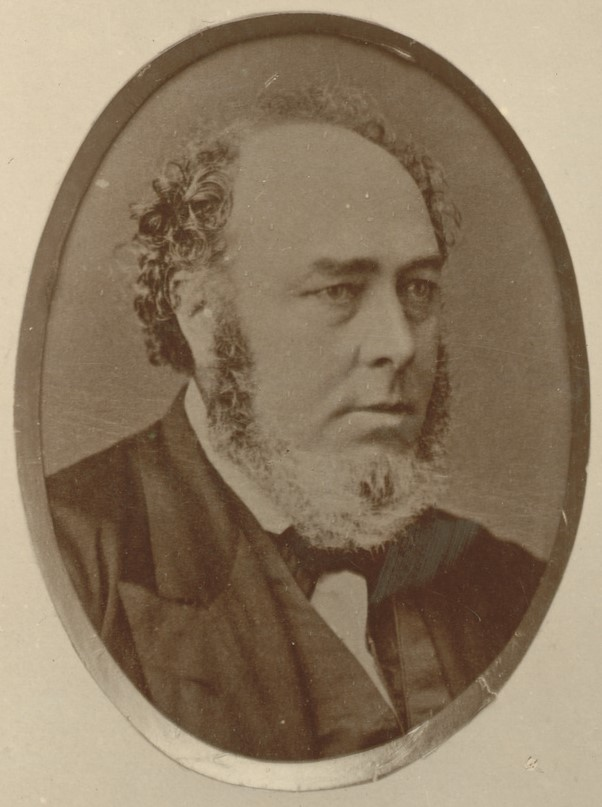

Member of the South Australian Parliament for Light
- In office 26 February 1857 – 12 March 1865 Serving with Carrington Smedley, William Maturin, David Shannon, Francis Dutton, John Rowe
- Preceded by: New District
- Succeeded by: Patrick Coglin

Personal details
- Born: 15 February 1819 King's County, Ireland
- Died: 13 August 1870 (aged 51)
- Spouse: Eliza Meyler
- Occupation: Lawyer, Pastoralist

John Tuthill Bagot (15 February 1819 – 13 August 1870) was a South Australian politician.

Bagot was the second son of Charles Bagot, of Kilcoursie House, King's County, Ireland, by Anna, eldest daughter of John Tuthill, of Kingsland, County Limerick. Though described as Charles Hervey Bagot's nephew their actual relationship was more distant. J. T. Bagot was admitted to the Irish bar. He married in 1848 Eliza, daughter of John Meyler.

Bagot emigrated to South Australia, and was elected to the semi-elective South Australian Legislative Council of 1855–6, for the district of Light. From 1857 to 1864 he represented Light in the South Australian House of Assembly. On 26 September 1866, he was elected to the new Legislative Council, and continued to hold the seat until 16 June 1870, when he resigned.

He was South Australia's only colonial Solicitor-General, serving in the Baker Ministry from 21 August to 1 September 1857. He also served as Commissioner of Crown Lands and Immigration in the First Reynolds Ministry from 9 May 1860, to 20 May 1861; Attorney-General in John Hart's Ministry from 24 September to 13 October 1868; and Chief Secretary in Mr. Strangways' Government from 3 November 1868, to 12 May 1870.

South Australian House of Assembly
| New district | Member for Light; 1857–1865; Served alongside: Carrington Smedley, William Maturin, David Shannon, Francis Dutton, John Rowe | Succeeded by Patrick Coglin |
Political offices
| New title | Solicitor-General of South Australia; 21 Aug – 1 Sep 1857 | Vacant Title next held by Andrew Wells QC |
| Preceded by Richard Andrews | Attorney-General of South Australia; 24 Sep – 13 Oct 1868 | Succeeded by Richard Andrews |
| Preceded by William Milne | Commissioner of Crown Lands and Immigration; 9 May 1860 – 20 May 1861 | Succeeded by Henry Strangways |
| Preceded by Henry Ayers | Chief Secretary of South Australia; 3 Nov 1868 – 12 May 1870 | Succeeded by Augustine Stow |
