= First Dutton ministry =

The First Dutton ministry was the 9th ministry of the Government of South Australia, led by Francis Dutton. It commenced on 4 July 1863, when Dutton, who had moved the motion to oust his predecessor, was sworn in to lead what was reported to be an interim ministry to deal with the Tariff Bill. However, the ministry was defeated on a series of adjournment votes on its first sitting day in parliament, and announced their resignation for lack of the parliament's confidence. Randolph Isham Stow was sent for but failed to win support to succeed Dutton, and with former Premier George Waterhouse and Arthur Blyth both lacking support, Henry Ayers was finally sent for and sworn in heading the First Ayers ministry on 15 July.

Office	Minister
Premier; Commissioner of Crown Lands and Immigration	Francis Dutton MHA
Chief Secretary	John Hart MHA
Attorney-General	Richard Bullock Andrews MHA
Treasurer	Lavington Glyde MHA
Commissioner of Public Works	William Townsend MHA
Member Without Office	Henry Ayers MLC
