= John McInnes (politician) =

Australian politician

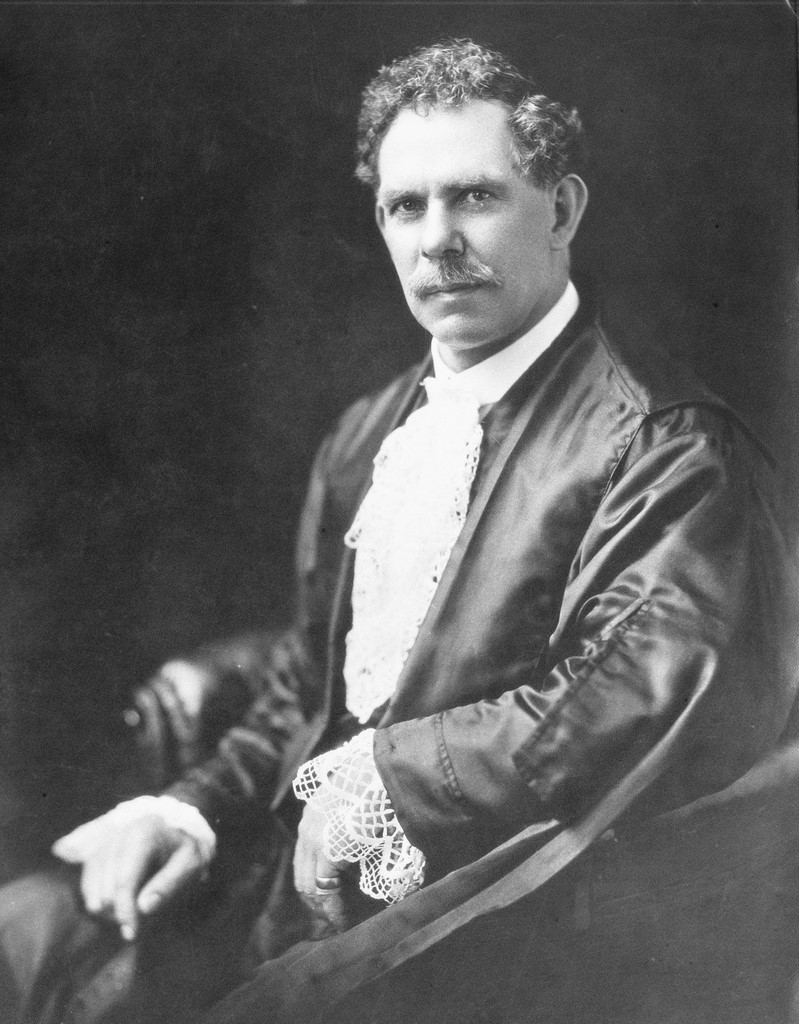

John McInnes (23 April 1878 – 30 September 1950) was an Australian politician. He was a member of the South Australian House of Assembly from 1918 to 1950, representing the electorates of West Torrens (1918–1938) and Hindmarsh (1938–1950). He was a member of the Labor Party throughout his career, apart from 1931 to 1934, when he represented the splinter Parliamentary Labor Party. He served as Speaker of the South Australian House of Assembly from 1924 to 1926.

McInnes was born in Scotland and moved to South Australia as a child. He was the inaugural secretary of the South Australian Government General Workers' Association from 1905 to 1911. He also became president of the United Trades and Labour Council of South Australia in 1908. McInnes was then general secretary of the Liquor Trades Employees Union from 1914 to 1924. He also served as president of the West Torrens Football Club for several years from 1917. Later, he served as state president of the Labor Party from 1927 to 1929 and mayor of the Town of Hindmarsh from 1933 to 1939.

He died at home in Croydon in 1950, only months after his retirement from parliament. He was accorded a state funeral.

Political offices
Preceded by Lionel Hill	Commissioner of Public Works; 1926 – 1927	Succeeded by Malcolm McIntosh
Preceded by Malcolm McIntosh	Commissioner of Public Works; 1930 – 1933	Succeeded by Herbert Hudd
Parliament of South Australia
Preceded by Richard Butler	Speaker of the South Australian House of Assembly; 1924–1926	Succeeded by Frederick Birrell
