= Marshall MacDermott =

Australian politician

Marshall MacDermott (c. 1791 – 3 November 1877) was a British Army officer and member of the South Australian Legislative Council 1855 to 1857 and a member for the South Australian House of Assembly seat of Flinders from 1857 to 1859.

== Army career ==
MacDermott entered the British army in the year 1808, as an officer in the 8th Regiment of Foot, and during the same year saw active service in the West Indies, when the British forces captured the Island of Martinique, after several days' fighting in the field and six weeks siege of Fort Bourbon. After this MacDermott saw some severe work during the War of 1812 between England and the United States; and in 1812, on the frontier of the State of New York was dangerously wounded in the neck, the gullet being divided. In the winter of 1814-15 he was the bearer of a despatch from Montreal to Upper Canada, announcing the termination of hostilities. His regiment was ordered to return to Europe to join in the conflict with Napoleon, after the Emperor's escape from Elba. Ten thousand troops embarked at Quebec on this service, but on the convoy reaching the English Channel, they learned that the battle of Waterloo had been fought and won seven days previously. After this MacDermott served in the United Kingdom and the Mediterranean, and found time for a tour through France, Switzerland, and Italy. At Argostoli, in the island of Cephalonia, he became acquainted with Lord Byron, who entrusted him with the three last cantos of Don Juan, to be delivered to Sir John Cam Hobhouse, a commission which MacDermott executed, having just then obtained leave of absence in order to visit England. Subsequently he was with his regiment in various parts of the United Kingdom till the year 1829, when he resolved to sell out of the army and emigrate to Australia.

== Business career in Australia ==
In the following year MacDermott, with several other officers who had sold their commissions, emigrated to Western Australia, and he settled as an agriculturist on the Swan River, where he purchased 5,000 acres, having also the right to select a large block of over 20,000 acres, according to the regulations, on account of property and servants be introduced into the colony. The first bank at Swan River was started through MacDermott's suggestion and exertions, backed up by colonists of influence and means, and he was appointed Manager. Five years afterwards the Bank of Australasia proposed to amalgamate with the local institution, and this being agreed, sent a Manager from London, who died before the bank was opened, and MacDermott was made Manager of the new bank. Five years later the Australasian Bank resolved to close their branch at Perth, Western Australia and offered MacDermott the Managership of that at Adelaide, which he accepted. On leaving Swan River he received a flattering address, signed by all the members of the Executive Council, the Magistrates, clergy, and many others. Just before leaving England for Western Australia he married, and all his children were born in that colony. In Adelaide, under his management, the Australasian Bank secured a large share of the business. With George Tinline he supported the Bullion Act, which at a critical time saved the colony from serious financial embarrassment. Soon afterwards his connection with the bank ceased, and he entered into general commercial business, in which he was not successful.

== Political career ==
In the year 1855 MacDermott offered himself as a candidate to represent the Noarlunga District, in the old mixed Council, composed of two-thirds elected members, and one-third nominees, but was defeated, and accepted a nomineeship. MacDermott was soon afterwards appointed Chairman of Committees. MacDermott was member of the Council from 25 October 1855 until it was abolished on 2 February 1857.

MacDermott then represented Flinders in the South Australian House of Assembly from 23 February 1857 to 1 September 1859, being Commissioner of Crown Lands and Immigration from 1 September 1857 to 30 September 1857.

== Late life and legacy ==
In 1859 MacDermott was appointed a Special Magistrate, and presided at the Willunga and Morphett Vale Courts, till removed to the North, where he administered justice in the Local Courts of Redruth, Clare, Auburn, and Riverton. After 10 years' service as a Stipendiary Magistrate Macdennott retired, and received, on relinquishing his post, two gratifying addresses, one from the members of the bar practising in the Northern Courts, and the other from all the Magistrates and numerous other residents of the district. Macdermott always took a very warm interest in religious matters, particularly in connection with the Church of England, of which he was a member. His long and honourable life was varied and eventful, and in compliance with the wishes of some members of his family, he three years later drew up a condensed account of his career, which was printed exclusively for the use of his relatives and friends and obtained by the South Australian Advertiser. MacDermott was survived by a widow and three daughters. Their eldest daughter Caroline (ca.1822 – 1 June 1855) married Francis Dutton, C.M.G., (Premier of South Australia in the 1860s), and died many years before MacDermott, after giving birth to (later Sir) Frederick Dutton (14 April 1855 – c. 10 October 1930).
