= Norman Campbell (politician) =

Australian politician

Major E. S. Norman Campbell (c. 1804 – 6 January 1859) was a politician in the newly declared colony of South Australia, later served in the neighboring colony of Victoria in a number of senior Government positions.

He served as an officer with H.M. 22nd Regiment (perhaps the 22nd Regiment of Foot) and as a lieutenant in 1830 published a dictionary which served as a manual for young officers and whose revised edition of 1844 is still available as a reprint today.

He was a member of the board of the Australian Mining Company, which had a mine at Tungkillo, but was forced to resign in July 1851, for (unspecified) "acts on his part which the directors felt themselves unable to sanction", to be replaced by William Forster.

He was appointed one of the "Non-official Nominees" for the Legislative Council in February 1851 and resigned in December 1851, and was succeeded by George Anstey. He resigned his appointments as Special Magistrate and Justice of the Peace for South Australia and as Trustee of the Savings Bank of South Australia.

He moved to the neighbouring colony of Victoria, where he was appointed Registrar-General and Chairman of the Road Board, among other positions. (After his death, the position of Registrar-General devolved to William Henry Archer (1825 – 29 April 1909), who had acted in that position and had reasonably expected to have it made permanent before Campbell's elevation, but worked cheerfully as his assistant.)

He died in Hobart Town, Van Diemen's Land (today's Hobart, Tasmania). The circumstances of his last years invite speculation: the resignation from his various positions and departure from South Australia was accorded the briefest of mentions in the Press; the appointment of this no doubt talented and well-mannered "outsider" as Victorian Registrar-General (which despite protestations by supporters may have been a boondoggle); his unexplained presence (and death) in Hobart, where a funeral was held at his residence, 2 Fitzroy Place, followed by the most parsimonious of obituaries in all three colonies, smack of deferential reticence on the part of the Fourth Estate.

== Bibliography ==
- Campbell, E. S. N. A Dictionary of the Military Science 1830, new edition pub. London by James Maynard 1844

== Family ==
His only daughter, Madeline Gertrude Campbell (c. 1832 – 18 April 1878) lived at Octavia Street, St. Kilda, Victoria.
