= First Reynolds ministry =

The First Reynolds ministry was the 5th ministry of the Government of South Australia, led by Thomas Reynolds. It commenced on 9 May 1860, following Reynolds' defeat of the Hanson ministry on a confidence vote in the House of Assembly. The ministry was defeated in May 1861, but Reynolds' opponents were unable to form a government, and he formed the reconstituted Second Reynolds ministry on 20 May 1861.

Office	Minister
Premier; Treasurer	Thomas Reynolds MHA
Chief Secretary	George Waterhouse MLC (until 4 February 1861)
Attorney-General	Henry Strangways MHA
Commissioner of Crown Lands and Immigration	John Tuthill Bagot MHA
Commissioner of Public Works	Alexander Hay MHA
Chief Secretary	John Morphett MLC (from 4 February 1861)
