= Second Holder ministry =

The Second Holder ministry was the 42nd ministry of the Government of South Australia, led by Frederick Holder. It commenced on 8 December 1899, following the defeat of the seven-day Solomon ministry. It was succeeded by the Jenkins ministry on 15 May 1901, following Holder's retirement from state politics to enter federal politics, and his replacement as leader of the liberal faction in parliament by his Chief Secretary, John Jenkins.

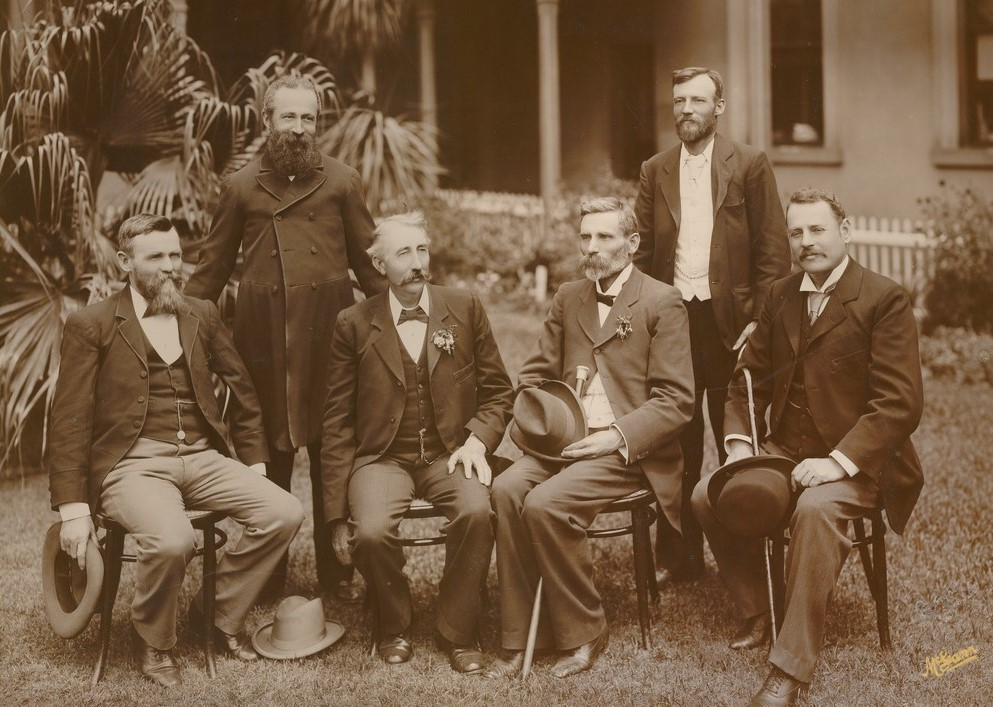

Office	Minister
Premier; Treasurer; Minister of Industry	Frederick Holder MHA
Chief Secretary	John Jenkins MHA
Attorney-General	John Hannah Gordon MLC
Commissioner of Crown Lands	Laurence O'Loughlin MHA
Commissioner of Public Works	Richard Foster MHA
Minister of Education and Agriculture	Lee Batchelor MHA ^{[1]}

== Notes ==
^{1} Lee Batchelor, the Minister for Education and Agriculture, was a member of the United Labor Party. He was the first Labor member in Australia to serve in a non-Labor Cabinet, with the support of his party.
