= Baker ministry =

- 2nd Cabinet of the Colony of South Australia

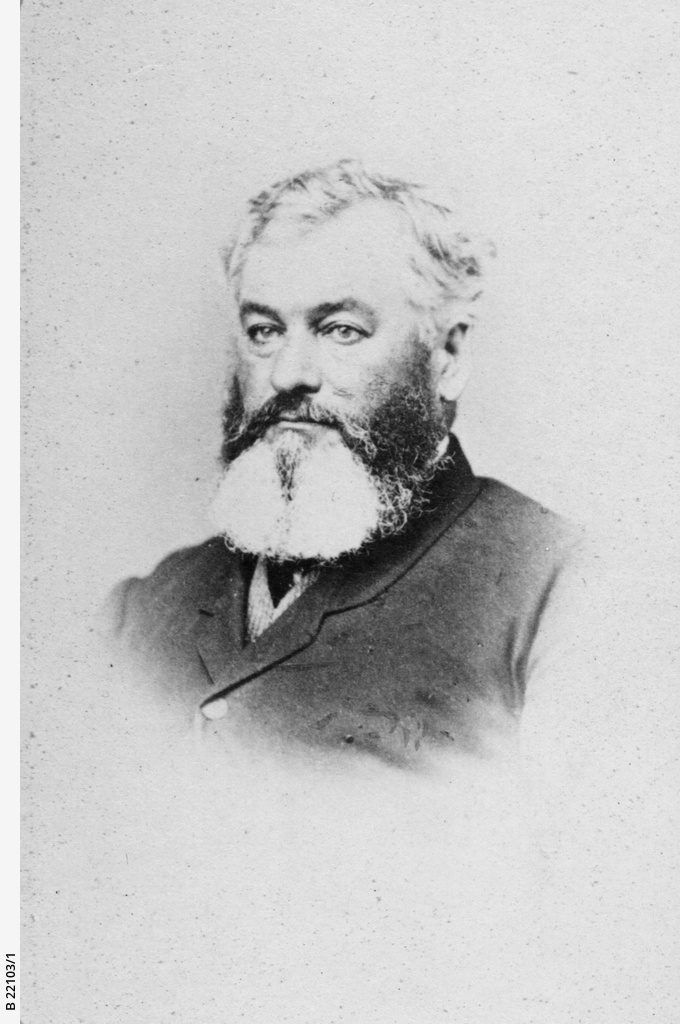
- Premier John Baker (1869)
- Date formed: 21 August 1857
- Date dissolved: 1 September 1857

People and organisations
- Monarch: Queen Victoria
- Governor: Sir Richard MacDonnell
- Premier: John Baker
- No. of ministers: 6
- Member party: unaligned
- Status in legislature: Minority Government
- Opposition party: unaligned

History
- Predecessor: Finniss ministry
- Successor: Torrens ministry

The Baker ministry was the 2nd ministry of the Government of South Australia, led by Premier John Baker. It commenced on 21 August 1857 after Baker's allies defeated the Finniss ministry in the House of Assembly. The ministry lost a confidence vote after only two days, announced that they would resign, and adjourned parliament until the formation of the Torrens ministry on 1 September 1857. At 11 days in office, it is the third-shortest ministry in South Australian history.

== Composition of ministry ==
Portfolio	Minister	Term commence	Term end	Term of office
Premier; Chief Secretary	Hon. John Baker MLC	21 August 1857	1 September 1857	11 days
Colonial Treasurer	Hon. Capt. John Hart MHA	21 August 1857	1 September 1857	11 days
Attorney-General	Hon. Edward Gwynne MLC	21 August 1857	1 September 1857	11 days
Commissioner of Crown Lands and Immigration	Hon. William Milne MHA	21 August 1857	1 September 1857	11 days
Commissioner of Public Works	Hon. Arthur Blyth MHA	21 August 1857	1 September 1857	11 days
Solicitor-General	Hon. John Bagot MHA	21 August 1857	1 September 1857	11 days
