= Second Ayers ministry =

The Second Ayers ministry was the 11th ministry of the Government of South Australia, led by Henry Ayers. It commenced on 22 July 1864, when Ayers succeeded in reconstituting his ministry following its defeat on a no-confidence motion. It collapsed within days when both the new ministers, William Milne and Randolph Isham Stow, resigned, necessitating the resignation of the entire ministry. It was succeeded on 4 August 1864 by the First Blyth ministry.

Office	Minister
Premier; Chief Secretary	Henry Ayers MLC
Attorney-General	Randolph Isham Stow MHA
Treasurer	John Hart MHA
Commissioner of Crown Lands and Immigration	William Milne MHA
Commissioner of Public Works	Philip Santo MHA
