= First Waterhouse ministry =

The First Waterhouse ministry was the 7th ministry of the Government of South Australia, led by George Waterhouse. It commenced on 8 October 1861 as a short-term government solely for the purpose of dealing with an attempt to remove dissident judge Benjamin Boothby. As Henry Strangways refused to serve in the ministry, an Attorney-General was appointed from outside parliament, which the Constitution allowed for a period of up to three months. The ministry resigned following the passage of a motion to remove Boothby, but Waterhouse was successful in gaining support to form an ongoing government, which was sworn in on 17 October as the Second Waterhouse ministry.

Office	Minister
Premier; Chief Secretary	George Waterhouse MLC
Attorney-General	Henry Gawler
Treasurer	Arthur Blyth MHA
Commissioner of Crown Lands and Immigration	Matthew Moorhouse MHA
Commissioner of Public Works	Philip Santo MHA
