= Frederick Holder =

Australian politician (1850–1909)

The Honourable Sir Frederick Holder KCMG
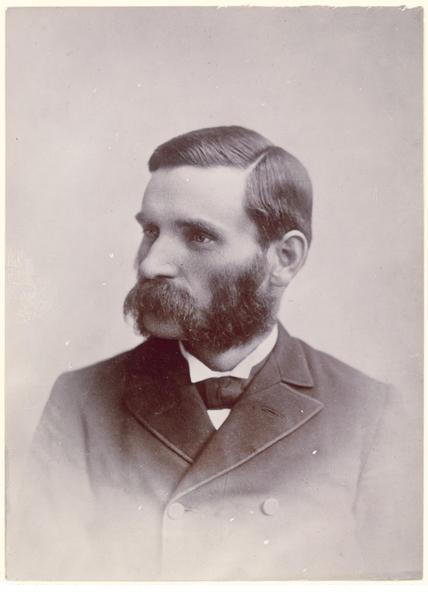

19th Premier of South Australia
- In office 21 June 1892 – 15 October 1892
- Monarch: Victoria
- Governor: Earl of Kintore
- Preceded by: Thomas Playford II
- Succeeded by: John Downer
- In office 8 December 1899 – 15 May 1901
- Monarchs: Victoria; Edward VII
- Governor: Sir Thomas Buxton; Lord Tennyson
- Preceded by: Vaiben Louis Solomon
- Succeeded by: John Jenkins

7th Leader of the Opposition (SA)
- In office 1890–1892
- Preceded by: Thomas Playford II
- Succeeded by: John Downer
- In office 1899–1899
- Preceded by: Vaiben Louis Solomon
- Succeeded by: Vaiben Louis Solomon

Member of the Australian Parliament for South Australia
- In office 30 March 1901 – 16 December 1903 Serving with Lee Batchelor, Langdon Bonython, Paddy Glynn, Charles Kingston, Alexander Poynton, Vaiben Louis Solomon
- Succeeded by: Division abolished

Member of the Australian Parliament for Wakefield
- In office 16 December 1903 – 23 July 1909
- Succeeded by: Richard Foster

1st Speaker of the Australian House of Representatives
- In office 9 May 1901 – 23 July 1909
- Succeeded by: Carty Salmon

Personal details
- Born: 12 May 1850 Happy Valley, South Australia
- Died: 23 July 1909 (aged 59) Melbourne, Victoria
- Party: Liberals (second term); Free Trade (from 1901); Independent (by 1903, to 1909)
- Spouse: Julia Maria Stephens

Sir Frederick William Holder KCMG (12 May 1850 – 23 July 1909) was an Australian politician who served as the first speaker of the Australian House of Representatives from 1901 to 1909. A member of the Free Trade Party and later an independent, he served twice as the 19th premier of South Australia from June to October 1892 and again from 1899 to 1901. He was a prominent member of federation movement and the first Parliament of Australia, following Federation in 1901.

== Early life ==
Holder was born on 12 May 1850 in Happy Valley, South Australia. He was the son of Martha Breakspear (née Roby) and James Morecott Holder. His parents were from London and had arrived in the colony in 1849.

Holder received his early education from his father, a schoolteacher at various state schools. He completed his schooling at St Peter's College, Adelaide, then began working as a teacher himself, spending periods at Prince Alfred College and at the state schools in Freeling and Burra. Holder was an unsuccessful applicant for the headmastership of the new Burra Model School in 1877. He decided to remain in Burra where he managed a general store and served as town clerk for the Burra Corporation. He also became managing editor of the Burra Record and later took over as proprietor.

Holder was a captain in the South Australian Volunteer Force, a part-time reserve unit, and was appointed to the council of the South Australian School of Mines and Industries. He was twice elected mayor of Burra, in 1886 and 1888, and was "largely responsible for a waterworks scheme and bridge construction".

== South Australian politics ==
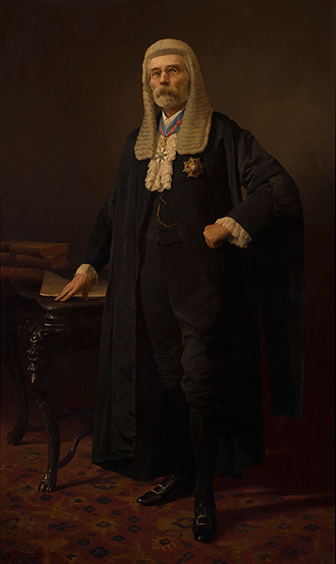
Parliament House portrait of Holder by George A. J. Webb, 1916

With considerable experience as a Councillor and Town Clerk, and just five months after his election as mayor of the Corporate Town of Burra, Holder was elected to the South Australian House of Assembly in 1887 as the member for Burra, and soon gained a sound reputation in parliament. As a result, he served as Treasurer of South Australia from 1889–90 in the J. A. Cockburn ministry, and Leader of the Opposition from 1890–92. He again served as Opposition Leader in 1899.

Holder was forced out as Premier after just four months.

Holder then served as Commissioner of Public Works in Charles Kingston's government from 1893–94, followed by a third stint as Treasurer from 1894 until his re-election as Premier and Treasurer in late 1899. As Premier, his most notable innovation was to introduce one standard time zone throughout South Australia, while he also played a prominent role in the movement towards a federal union, and, as such, was a member of the Constitutional convention that framed the Commonwealth constitution in 1897–98. He opposed to Convention's decision to transfer postal and telegraphic services to the new Commonwealth. 1897 Australasian Federal Convention election

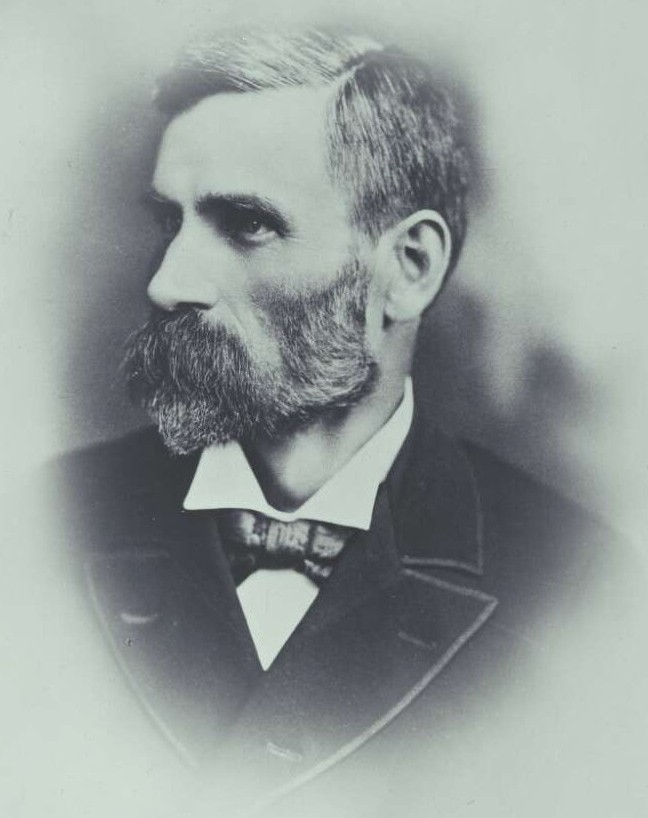
Holder at the 1897 Australasian Federal Convention election.

Holder took over the liberal leadership from Charles Kingston and was again Premier, this time from 1899 to 1901. He was succeeded in both roles by John Jenkins. The Liberal and Democratic Union would not be formed until the 1906 election.

== Federal politics ==
As Premier, Holder considered himself to be the logical choice for a ministerial position in the new federal cabinet, and was offered a cabinet position by William Lyne after Lyne was invited by the Governor-General, Lord Hopetoun to form a government and become the inaugural Prime Minister. Holder initially accepted, and was in Melbourne en route to Sydney to officially accept his ministry when he was convinced by Alfred Deakin to refuse Lyne and instead support Edmund Barton's claim to the premiership. Assured by Richard O'Connor, Barton's righthand man, that he would be invited to join the ministry if he supported Barton, Holder was furious when Barton instead chose Kingston. Nonetheless, Holder resigned as Premier to successfully contest the 1901 federal election for the Free Trade Party and entered the new federal parliament in the single statewide Division of South Australia. Elected Speaker of the House of Representatives, Holder followed traditional Westminster convention and resigned from his party upon his elevation as Speaker, and (again in accordance with traditional convention) was re-elected to parliament unopposed as an independent in the 1903 election in the Division of Wakefield. Labor did not observe the convention in the 1906 election, however, and contested the Division of Wakefield, but Holder was re-elected as an independent candidate. As speaker, he largely eschewed partisan politics, guided by the convention that the Speaker of the Westminster Parliament is strictly nonpartisan.

=== Death ===
Knighted in 1902, Holder served as Speaker until his death on 23 July 1909. A 14-hour parliamentary session had started the previous afternoon. At 5 am the House was in committee, but Holder was present, having been called to the chamber to receive the committee's report, and was seated on the front bench, next to the Minister for Home Affairs, George Fuller. During a rowdy exchange, he exclaimed "Dreadful, dreadful!", then slumped sideways in his seat. He was taken to his room, where a cerebral hemorrhage was diagnosed by three members with medical qualifications and a doctor from outside the house. He died at 4:18 pm that same day without having gained consciousness. He was given a state funeral in Adelaide.

== Recognition ==
Holder Road, in the Adelaide suburb of Hove, was named for him.

The Canberra suburb of Holder was named in his honour when gazetted in 1970.

== Family ==
On 29 March 1877, Holder married Julia Maria Stephens. She was president of the Women's Christian Temperance Union in South Australia, and a vice-president of the National Council of Women. Their family included:

- Ethel Roby Holder MA (1878– ) student at ASG, became art teacher. She married a Mr Harry of Victoria on 7 July 1908.
- Rhoda Sims Holder (1880– )
- Frederick Stephens Holder (1882– )
- Winifred Breakspeare Holder (1886– )
- Evan Morecott Holder (1888– )
- Sydney Ernest Holder (1890– )
- Ruth Eliza Holder (1892– )
- Ida Margaret Holder (1894– )

Holder had a brother, Herbert Reuben Holder (c. 1859 – 28 December 1915), for a time postmaster at Jamestown and a well-known musician, best known as a teacher of singing.

== See also ==
- First Holder Ministry
- Second Holder Ministry

South Australian House of Assembly
Preceded by John Cockburn	Member for Burra; 1887–1901; With: Ben Rounsevell / George Lake / Charles Goode	Succeeded by William Russell
Political offices
Preceded by Thomas Playford II	Leader of the Opposition of South Australia; 1890–1892	Succeeded by John Downer
Preceded by Thomas Playford II	Premier of South Australia; 1892	Succeeded by John Downer
Vacant Title last held by Lawrence Grayson	Commissioner of Public Works; 1893–1894	Succeeded by John Jenkins
Preceded by Vaiben Louis Solomon	Leader of the Opposition of South Australia; 1899	Succeeded by Vaiben Louis Solomon
Preceded by Vaiben Louis Solomon	Premier of South Australia; 1899–1901	Succeeded by John Jenkins
Parliament of Australia
New parliament	Speaker of the Australian House of Representatives; 1901–1909	Succeeded by Carty Salmon
New parliament	Member for South Australia; 1901–1903; With: Batchelor, Bonython, Glynn, Kingston, Poynton, Solomon	Division abolished
New division	Member for Wakefield; 1903–1909	Succeeded by Richard Foster
