= Robert Davenport (Australian politician) =

Australian politician

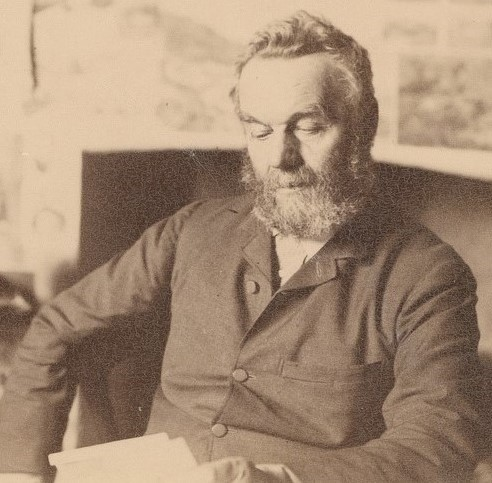

Robert Davenport (1816 – 3 September 1896) was a pioneer and politician in the early days of the Colony of South Australia. He was a brother of Sir Samuel Davenport.

== History ==
Robert Davenport was born in Shirburn, Oxfordshire and trained for the law. He and his brother (George) Francis Davenport arrived in South Australia in 1843 and settled at "Battunga" on the "Davenport survey". His more famous brother Samuel lived nearby.

The "Davenport survey" was an area defined by special survey east of "The Three Brothers survey" (which may have been originally selected for the Davenport brothers, then relinquished), and spreading south of Mount Barker to the source of the Angas, and incorporated the town of Macclesfield, named in honor of the Earl of Macclesfield (presumably the 6th Earl 1850–1896 ). Lower down the Angas was the "Angas survey", which incorporated the town of Strathalbyn.

Davenport lived on his original holding at "Battunga" for more than half a century. He was a capable watercolorist, and produced many studies of South Australian landscapes, some of which are held by the Art Gallery of South Australia. His family photograph album has been digitised by the State Library of South Australia and is available online.

Most of the information about the Mount Barker district in Francis Dutton's book South Australia and Its Mines (1848) was provided to its author by Robert Davenport.

== Political life ==
Robert Davenport was on 9 July 1851 elected as member for the electoral district of Hindmarsh in the second South Australian Legislative Council. He resigned his seat on 29 June 1854, his brother, Sir Samuel entering the Council again a few months later and remaining a member, even after the advent of constitutional government, until 30 August 1866. Robert took no further part in the politics of the Colony.

== Family ==
Davenport died at South terrace Hospital and was buried at the Battunga cemetery. His son Robert Noel Davenport played first-class cricket in New Zealand for Otago during the 1880s.
