= John Rankine (Australian politician) =

Australian politician

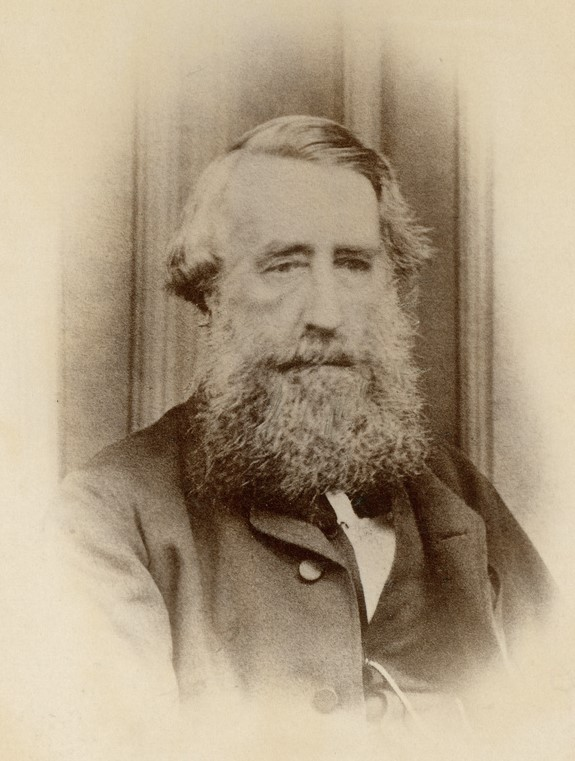

Dr. John Rankine (19 October 1801 – 15 Mar 1864), was a landowner and politician in the early days of the Colony of South Australia. He is recognised as founding the township of Strathalbyn.

== History ==
Rankine (often spelled Rankin) was born in Ayrshire, Scotland, a son of James Rankine and his wife Jane Rankine, née Paterson. He may have visited Van Diemen's Land (now Tasmania) as ship's doctor on the Sir William Bentinck in August 1838.

John and his wife Mary Miller Rankine, née Watson, together with his brother William Rankine and his wife Jane Rankine, née Rankine, and their seven children emigrated to South Australia on the Fairfield, arriving at Holdfast Bay in April 1839. They purchased a 50-acre special survey section of the Hundred of Angas, founding the town of Strathalbyn. John's 17 or 18 year-old nephew John Paterson and nieces Jane Gemmell Paterson and Elizabeth Paterson, aged 19 and 15, were also on the Fairfield. John Rankine later helped John Paterson found Pitchorum station. Other passengers on the Fairfield, including William Mein, George Hall (or Hall-Turnbull) (c. 1810– ), Oliver Keble Richardson (1800– ) purchased sections of the same "Special Survey". His Strathalbyn property, "Blackwood" eventually totalled 1,500 acres.

His wife, Mary Miller Rankine, owned considerable property in her own right: three Sections in the Hundred of Bremer, and several moieties in the Hundred of Freeling.

He leased a large section of Hindmarsh Island, where the family raised sheep and cattle, and in 1849 built a large house, the island's first, and operated "Rankine's Ferry" between the island and mainland. He began mining at Strathalbyn in 1848, and formed a company with E & C Stirling, A. L. Elder and W. H. Clark.

Health failing, he returned to Scotland sometime after November 1856 and died at Helensburgh in 1864.

== Politics ==
He was elected to the Legislative Council seat of Hindmarsh, and served from July 1854 to April 1857.

== Family ==
He was an uncle of fellow South Australian parliamentarian James Rankine.
