= Francis Dutton =

Australian politician (1818–1877)

The Honourable Francis Dutton CMG
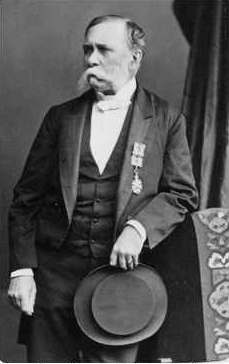

7th Premier of South Australia
- In office 4 July 1863 – 15 July 1863
- Monarch: Victoria
- Governor: Sir Dominick Daly
- Preceded by: George Waterhouse
- Succeeded by: Sir Henry Ayers
- Constituency: Light
- In office 22 March 1865 – 20 September 1865
- Monarch: Victoria
- Governor: Sir Dominick Daly
- Preceded by: Sir Arthur Blyth
- Succeeded by: Sir Henry Ayers

Personal details
- Born: 18 October 1818 Cuxhaven, Lower Saxony
- Died: 25 January 1877 (aged 58) London, United Kingdom

Francis Stacker Dutton CMG (18 October 1818 – 25 January 1877) was the seventh Premier of South Australia, serving twice, firstly in 1863 and again in 1865.

== Early life and education ==
Francis Dutton was born at Cuxhaven, Germany, in 1818. He was educated at Hofwyl College, near Bern in Switzerland.

== Career ==
In 1839, Francis joined his older brothers Hampden, Pelham and Frederick in Sydney.

In 1850 Dutton wrote "Constitution fuer Suedaustralien: Gesetz zur bessern Regierung der australischen Colonien Ihrer Majestaet" (In English: Constitution for South Australia: Act for the better government of Her Majesty's Australian Colonies) to bring discussions on the formation of a constitution in South Australia to the attention of German settlers.

He was elected a member of the Legislative Council for East Adelaide in 1851 and sat until 1857, when he was elected to the House of Assembly as member for City of Adelaide (9 March 1857 to 18 March 1860) and then for Light (19 March 1860 to 22 Apr 1862; and 17 November 1862 to 28 September 1865). He was Commissioner of Crown Lands and Immigration in the Hanson government from 30 September 1857 to 2 June 1859, and was premier from 4 to 15 July 1863. He formed his second cabinet on 22 March 1865 and was premier and commissioner of public works until 20 September of the same year, when he became agent-general for South Australia in London.

He was one of the judges appointed by the Gawler Institute to select the music for Caroline Carleton's "Song of Australia".

== Death ==
Dutton died on 25 January 1877.

== Recognition ==
Dutton was made a Commander of the Order of St Michael and St George (CMG) in 1872. He was also a Fellow of the Geographical Society, Associate of the Institute of Civil Engineers, and a Member of both the Royal Institution of Great Britain and Colonial Institute.

Dutton's Bluff, later Dutton Bluff, a hill some 66 km north-west of Quorn, was named for him and the Victorian government botanist named Eremophila duttonii in his honour.

== Family ==
Dutton married Caroline MacDermott (ca.1822 – 1 June 1855), a daughter of Marshall MacDermott on 7 November 1849; they had two sons and a daughter:

- Francis "Frank" MacDermott Dutton (1850 – c. 9 May 1932)
- Caroline Birch Dutton (15 August 1852 – 1950) married barrister Charles Thomas Mitchell in Norland, Middlesex on 17 August 1878. Her portrait was painted by Carlile Henry Hayes Macartney
- Sir Frederick Dutton (14 April 1855 – c. 10 October 1930), solicitor of Wilkins, Blyth, Dutton and Hartley, married Beatrice Aimee Bridger MBE (1863 – 1 August 1928) in 1883.

William Hampden Dutton (1805–1849), pastoralist of Anlaby Station and miner at Kapunda, was a brother, as was pastoralist and parliamentarian Frederick Hansborough Dutton (1812–1890).

Note: William Dutton (1811–1878), sometimes referred to as "William Pelham Dutton", ship's captain, whaler and pioneer of Portland, Victoria, was not closely related. Author Geoffrey Dutton, great-grandson of W. H. Dutton, warned against this confusion in his article on F. S. Dutton in the Australian Dictionary of Biography. For his relationship to other people prominent in the history of South Australia see separate article.

== Sources ==
- Parliament of South Australia - Dutton
- South Australian Register and South Australian Advertiser, 29 January 1877.
- F. Dutton (1846), South Australia and its Mines, London: T. and W. Boone.
- Mennell, Philip (1892). "Dutton, Francis Stacker" . The Dictionary of Australasian Biography. London: Hutchinson & Co – via Wikisource.
- "Our Agents-General.—No. 1.: Mr. Francis S. Dutton". South Australian Register. Adelaide. 21 April 1873. p. 6 – via Trove.

Political offices
Preceded by Marshall MacDermott	Commissioner of Crown Lands and Immigration; 30 Sep 1857 – 2 Jun 1859	Succeeded by John Neales
Preceded by Henry Strangways	Commissioner of Crown Lands and Immigration; 4 Jul 1863 – 15 Jul 1863	Succeeded by Lavington Glyde
Preceded by George Waterhouse	Premier of South Australia; 4 Jul 1863 – 15 Jul 1863	Succeeded by Henry Ayers
Preceded by Arthur Blyth	Premier of South Australia; 22 Mar 1865 – 20 Sep 1865	Succeeded by Henry Ayers
Preceded by William Milne	Commissioner of Public Works; 22 Mar 1865 – 20 Sep 1865	Succeeded by Philip Santo
Parliament of South Australia
Preceded by New district	Member for City of Adelaide; 1857–1860; Served alongside: Robert Torrens, Judah Solomon, Richard Hanson, Boyle Finniss, John Neales, William Burford, William Owen	Succeeded by Matthew Moorhouse
Preceded by David Shannon	Member for Light; 1860–1862; Served alongside: John Bagot	Succeeded by John Rowe
Preceded by John Rowe	Member for Light; 1862–1865; Served alongside: John Bagot	Succeeded by John Rounsevell
Diplomatic posts
Preceded by Gregory Walters	Agent-General for South Australia; 1865–1877	Succeeded by Arthur Blyth
