= Political families of Australia =

A political family of Australia (also called a political dynasty) is a family in which multiple members are involved in Australian politics, particularly electoral politics. Members may be related by blood or marriage; often several generations or multiple siblings may be involved. Like comparable liberal democracies in the United States, Japan, Canada and The United Kingdom, Australia is susceptible to the phenomenon of political dynasties. There have been many instances where members of the same family have been elected to the same state or federal electoral district, sometimes immediately succeeding a family member.

The following families have had two or more members serve as premier of an Australian state:

- Butler family - (Premier of South Australia)
- Cain family - (Premier of Victoria)
- Court family - (Premier of Western Australia)
- Hamer family - (Premier of Victoria)
- Playford family - (Premier of South Australia)
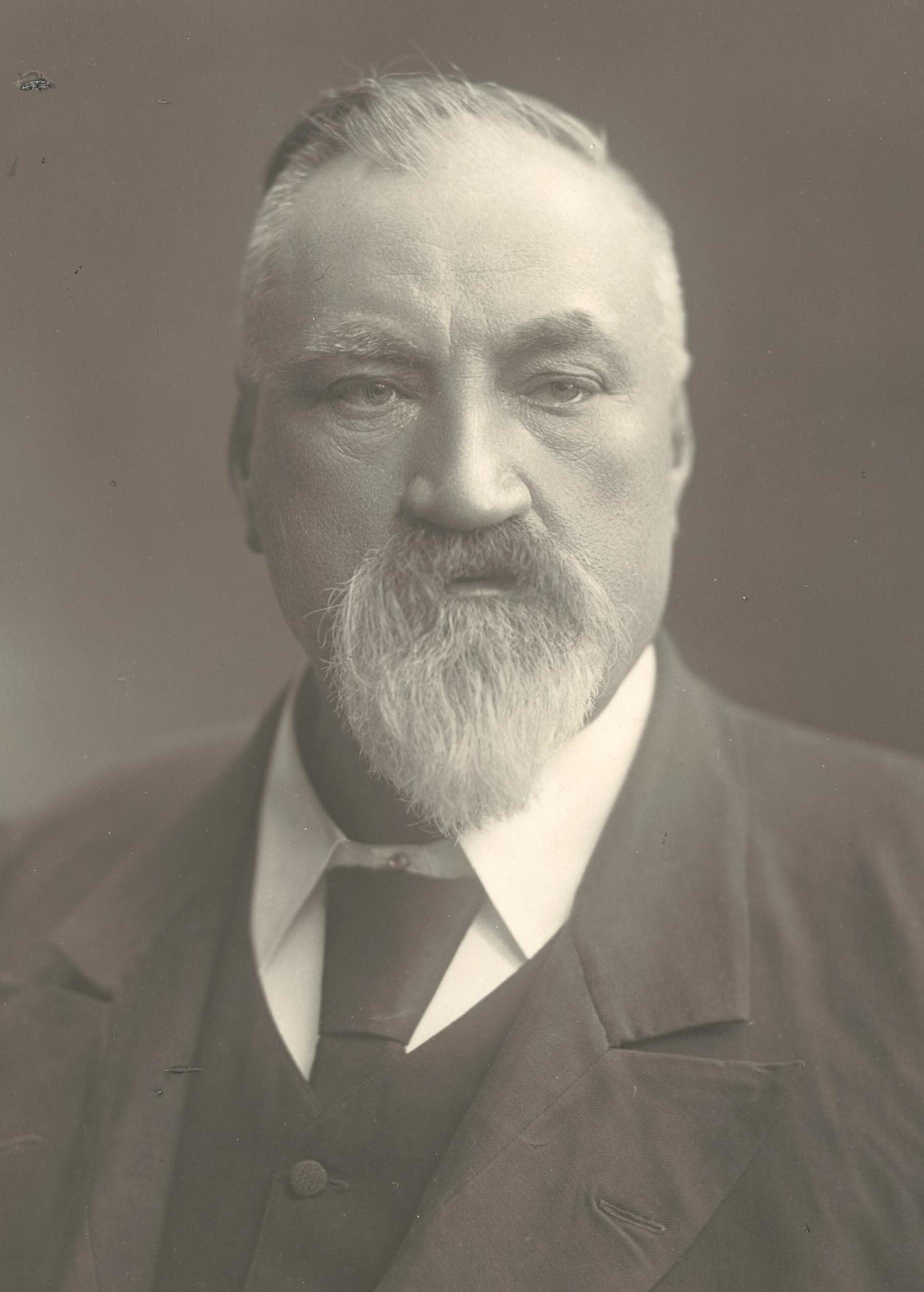
Thomas Playford II
(Premier of South Australia, 1887–1889, 1890–1892)

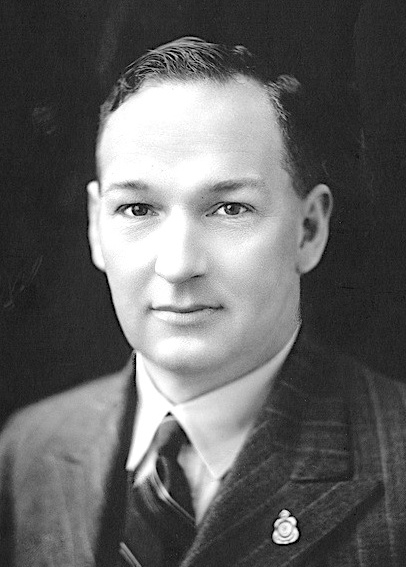
Thomas Playford IV
(Premier of South Australia, 1938–1965)

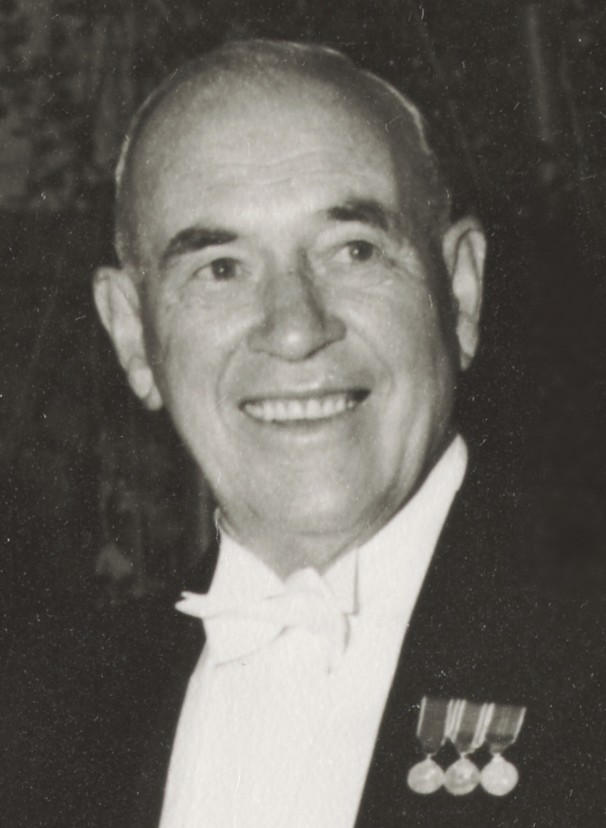
John Cain Sr.
(Premier of Victoria, 1943, 1945–1947, 1952–1955)

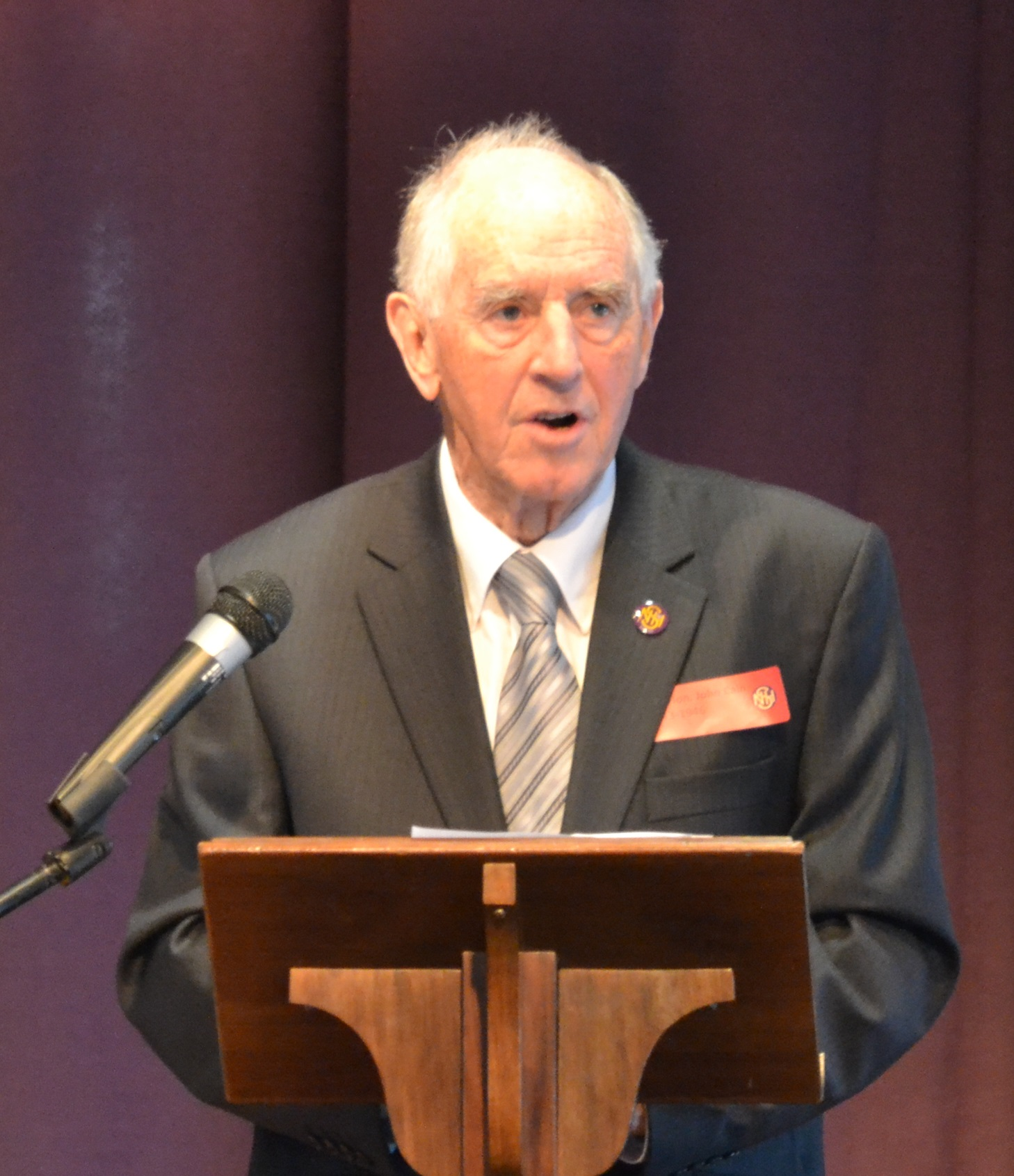
John Cain Jr.
(Premier of Victoria, 1982–1990)

The following families have had two or more members serve in the same federal cabinet position:

- Beazley family - (Minister for Education)
- Crean family - (Minister for Trade)
- Lyons family - (Vice-President of the Executive Council)
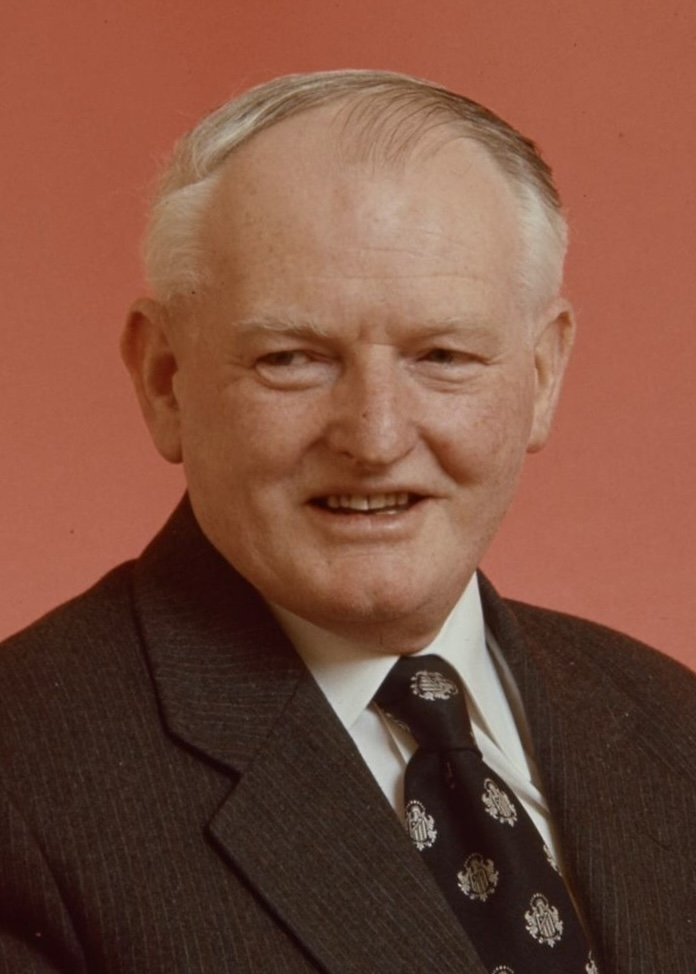
Frank Crean
(Minister for Trade, 1974–1975)

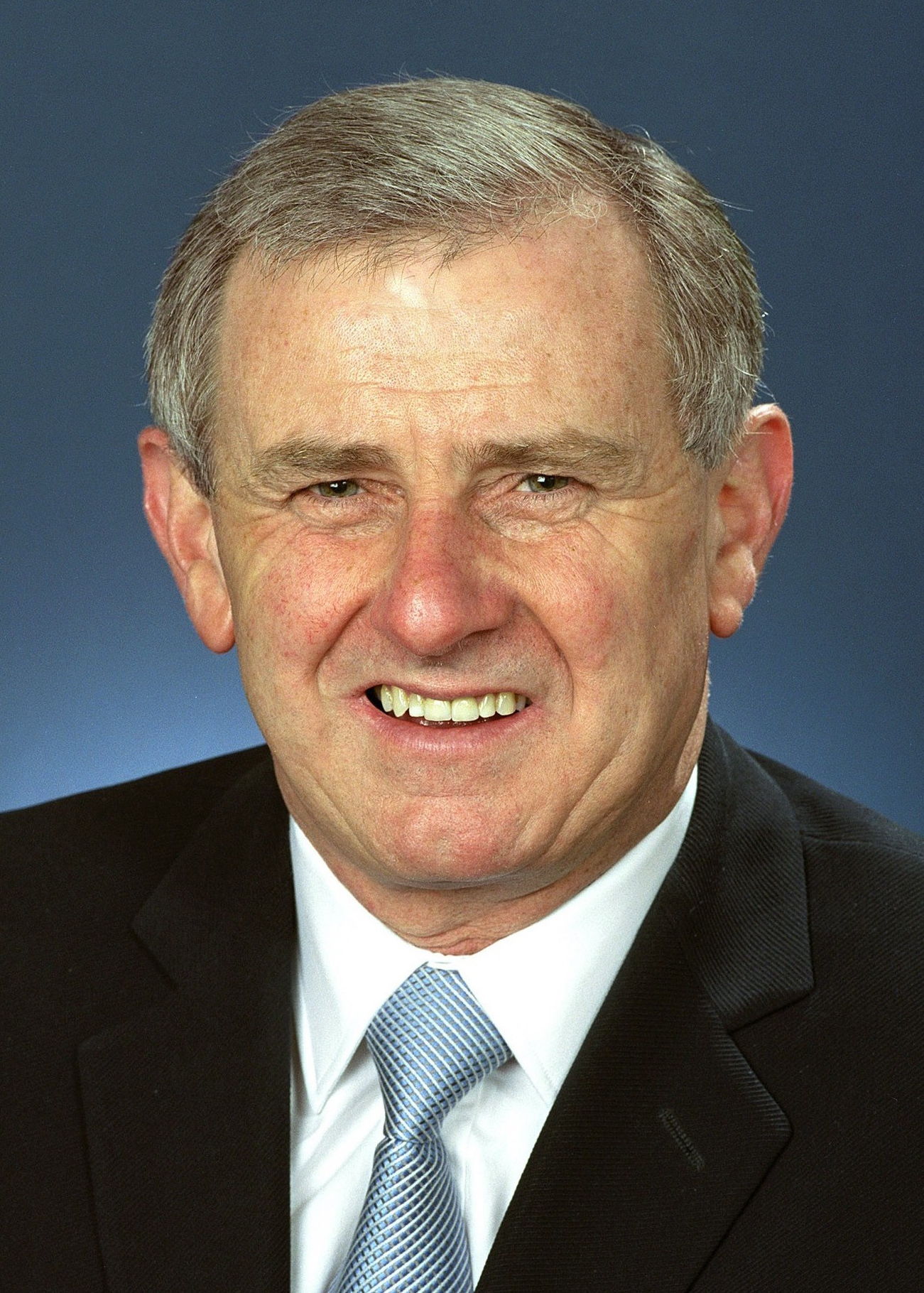
Simon Crean
(Minister for Trade, 2007–2010)

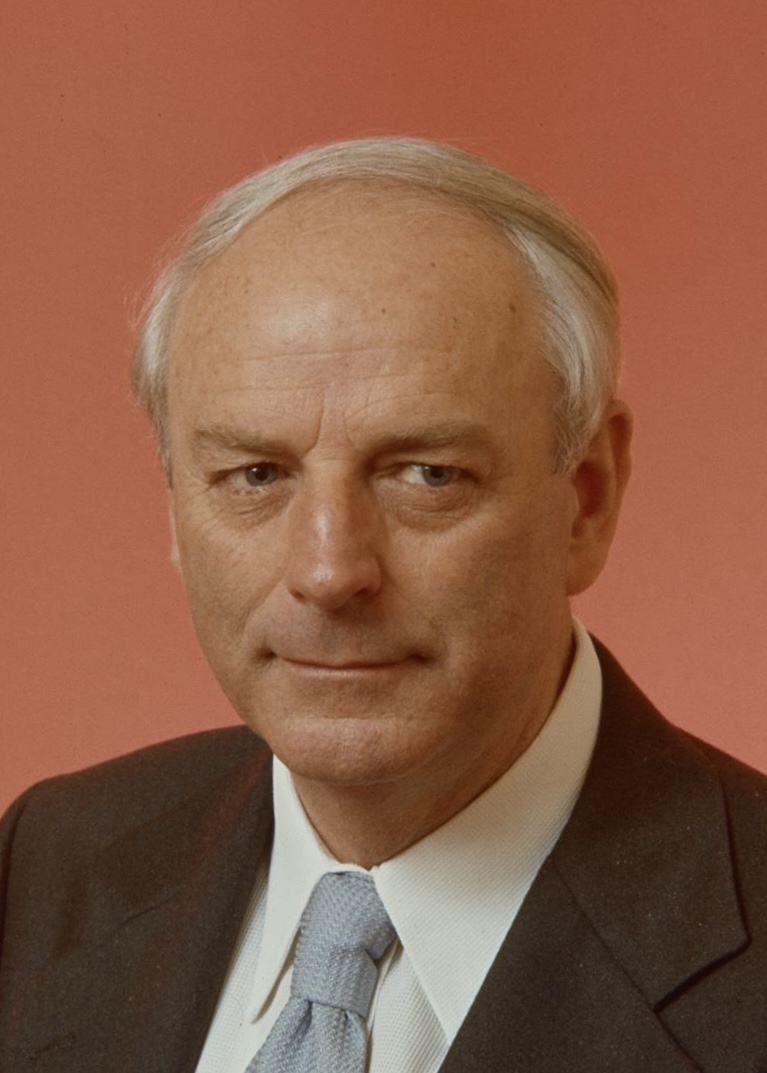
Kim Beazley Sr.
(Minister for Education, 1972–1975)

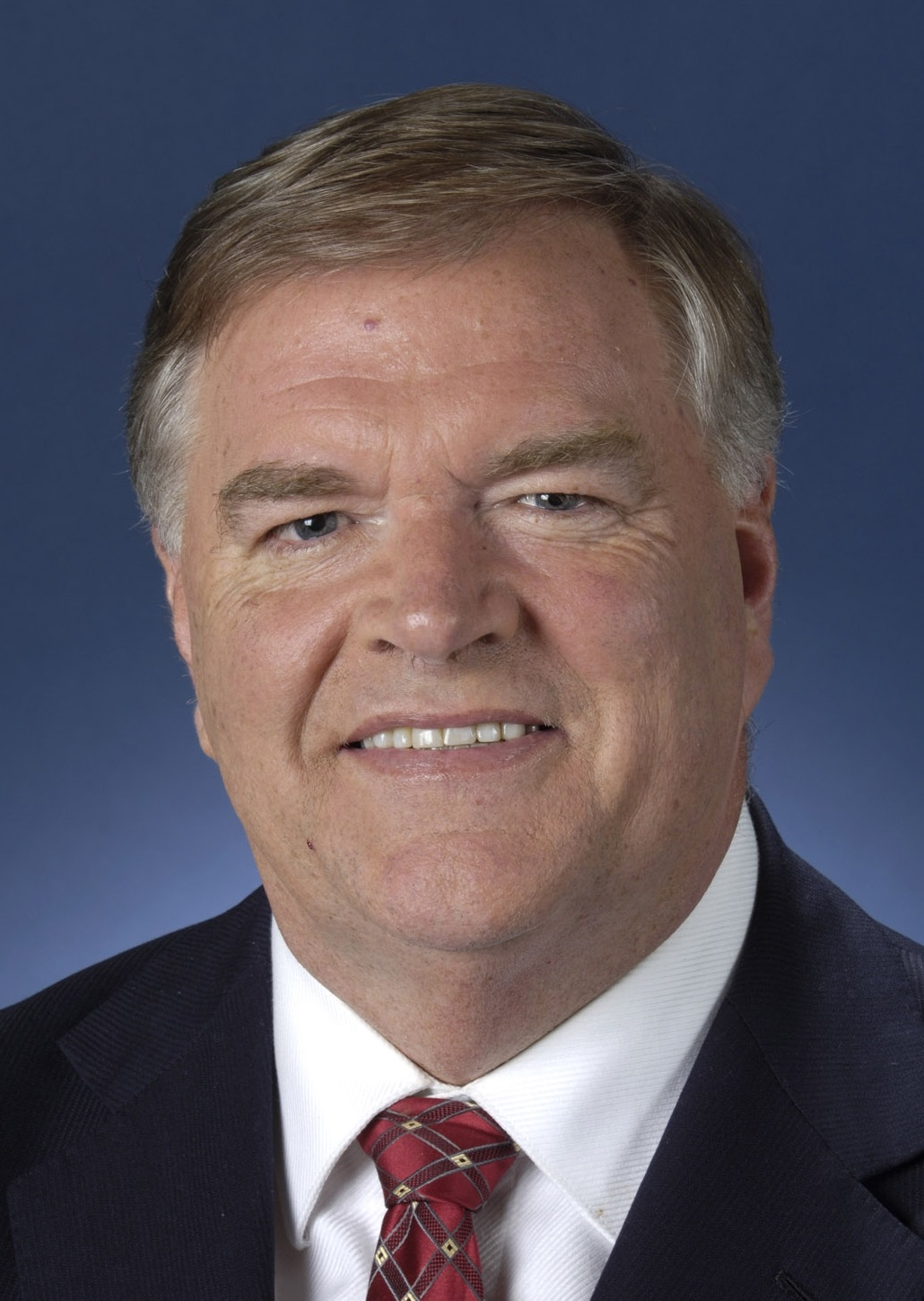
Kim Beazley
(Minister for Education, 1991–1993)

The following families have had two or more members serve in vice-regal positions:

- O'Connell/Bligh family - (Governor of New South Wales, Administrator of Queensland)
- Street family - (Lieutenant-Governor of New South Wales)
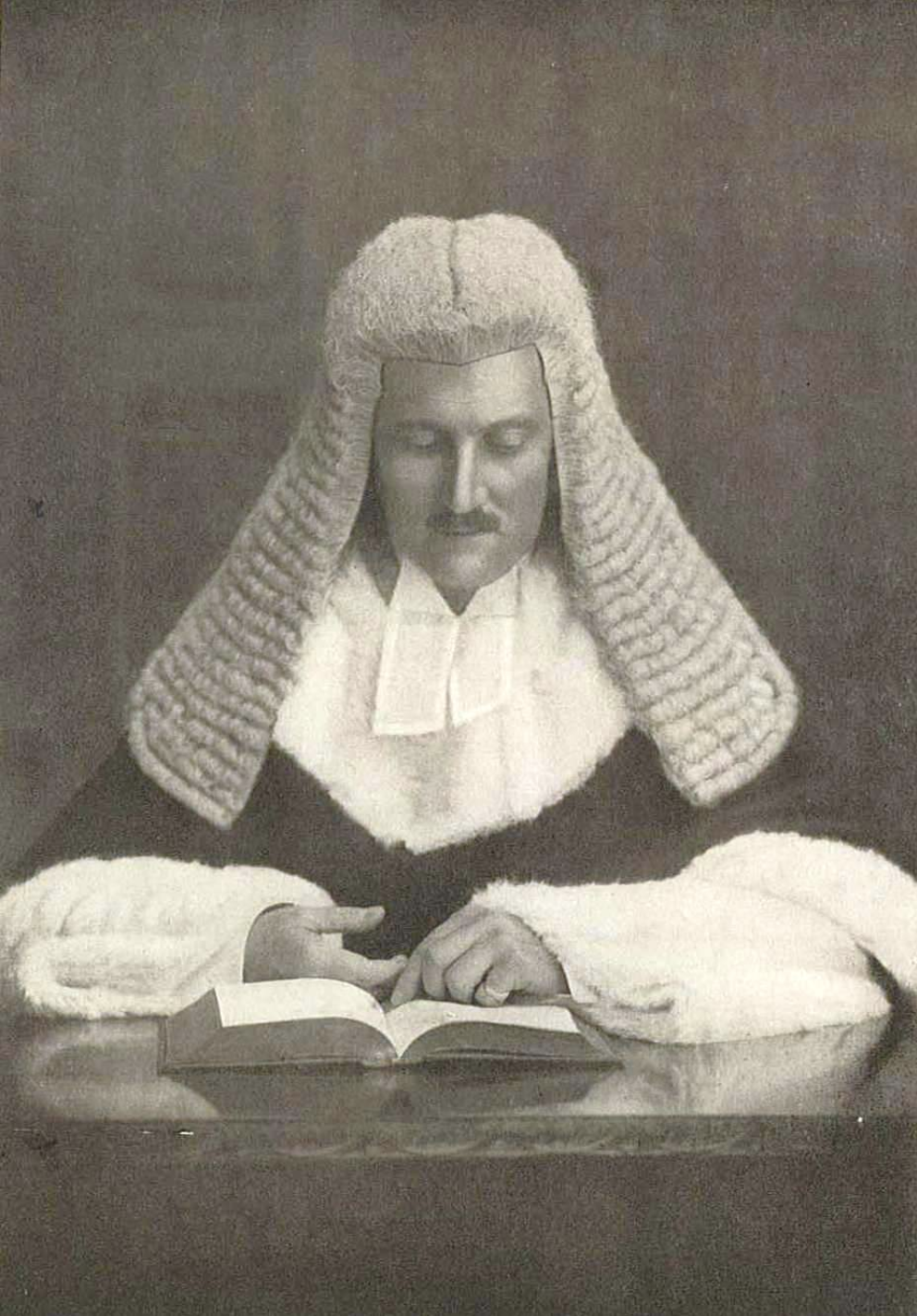
Sir Phillip Street (Lieutenant-Governor of New South Wales, 1930–1938)

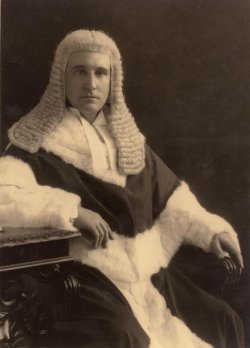
Sir Kenneth Street (Lieutenant-Governor of New South Wales, 1950–1972)

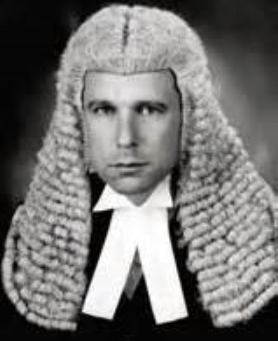
Sir Laurence Street (Lieutenant-Governor of New South Wales, 1974–1989)

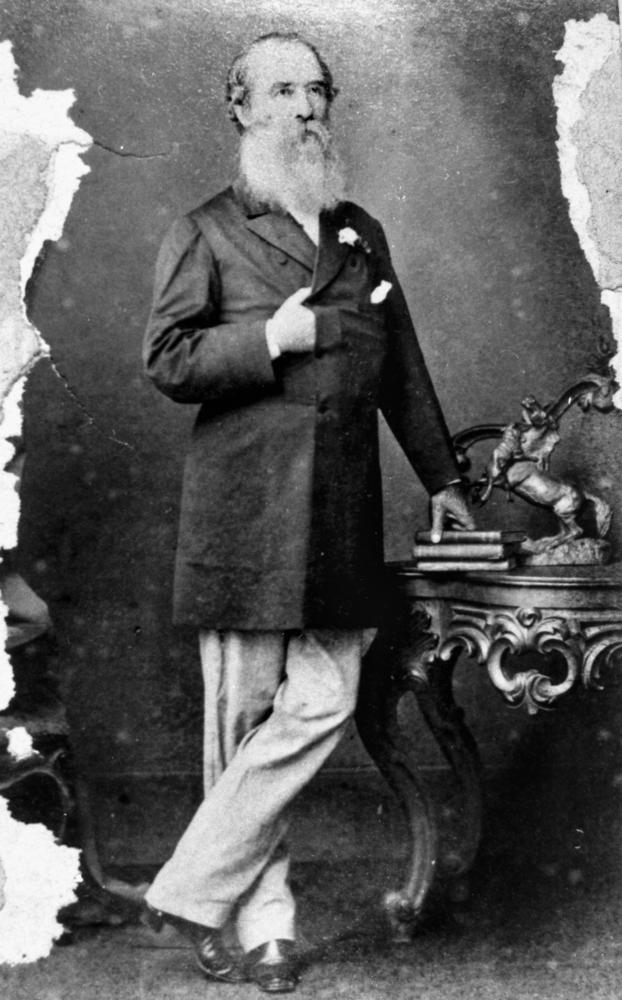
Sir Maurice Charles O'Connell
(Administrator of Queensland, 1868, 1871, 1874–1875, 1877)

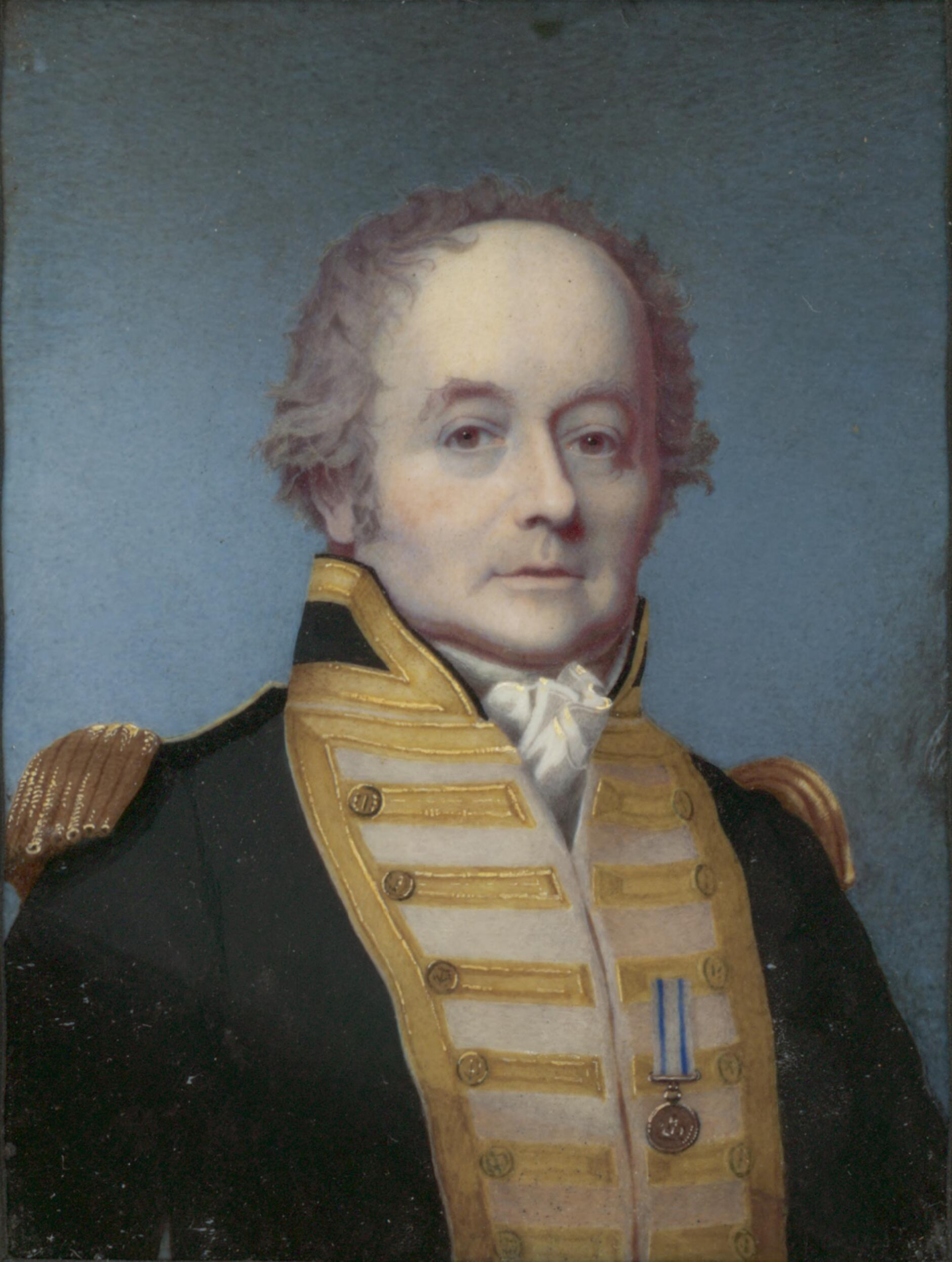
William Bligh
(Governor of New South Wales, 1806–1808)

The following families have had three or more members elected to the same district:

- Archer family - (Tasmanian Legislative Council)
- Anthony family - (Division of Richmond)
- Best family - (Division of Wilmot)
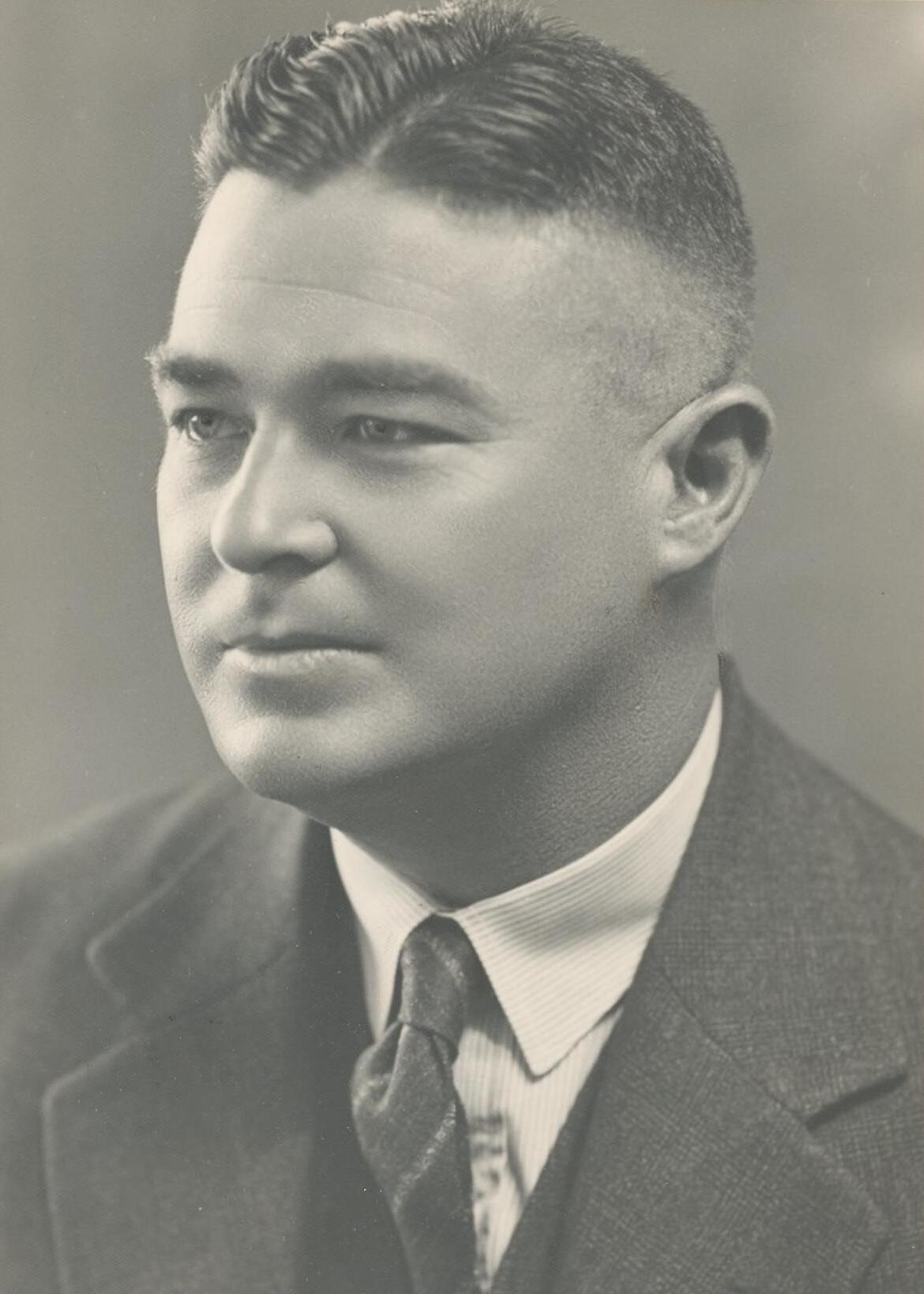
Larry Anthony
(Member for Richmond, 1937–1957)

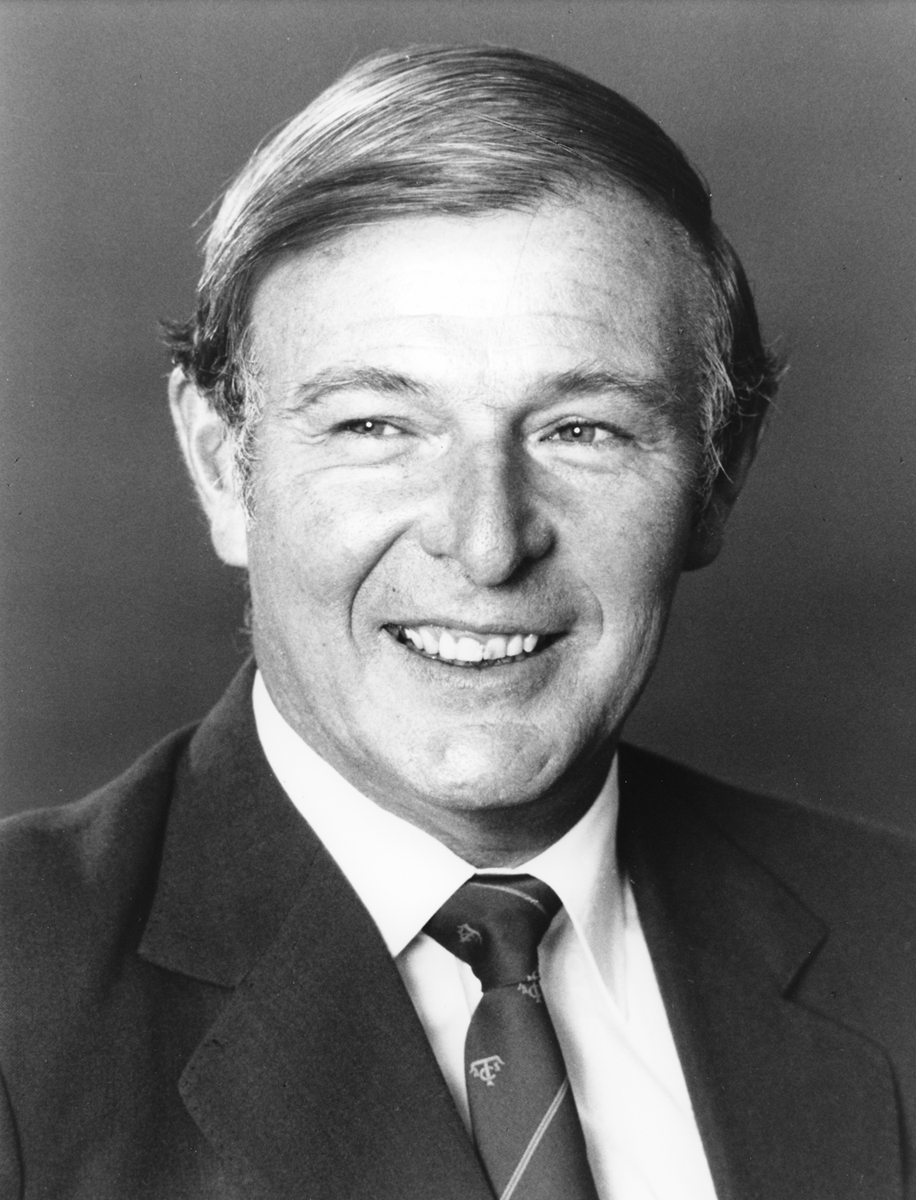
Doug Anthony
(Member for Richmond, 1957–1984)

The following families have had two or more members serve as mayor of an Australian capital city:

- Fong Lim family - (Lord Mayor of Darwin)
- Leake family - (Mayor of Perth)
- Shenton family - (Mayor of Perth)
- Valentine family - (Mayor/Lord Mayor of Hobart)
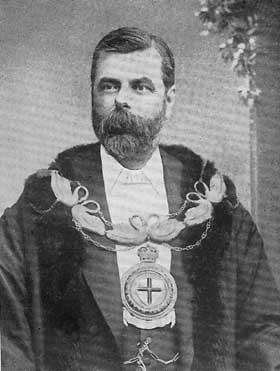
George Shenton
(Mayor of Perth, 1876–1877, 1880, 1882–1884, 1886–1888)

The following families had two members elected to the same district:

- Adermann family - (Division of Fisher)
- Archer family - (Electoral district of Ringwood)
- Bacon family - (Division of Denison)
- Basedow family - (Electoral district of Barossa)
- Bell family - (Electoral district of Dalby)
- Berry family - (Ginninderra electorate)
- Blyth family - (Electoral district of North Adelaide)
- Booth family - (Electoral district of Kurri Kurri)
- Brown/Hoare family - (Division of Charlton)
- Burdekin family - (Electoral district of East Sydney)
- Byrnes family - (Electoral district of Parramatta)
- Cameron family - (Electoral district of Wilmot)
- Camm family - (Electoral district of Whitsunday)
- Chaffey family - (Electoral district of Tamworth)
- Clark family - (Electoral district of Warwick)
- Clarke family - (Electoral district of Southern Province)
- Corrigan family - (Electoral district of Port Melbourne)
- Court family - (Electoral district of Nedlands)
- Cremean family - (Electoral district of Clifton Hill)
- Cribb family - (Electoral district of Ipswich)
- Evans family - (Electoral district of Davenport)
- Fitzgibbon family - (Division of Hunter)
- Gilmore family - (Electoral district of Tablelands)
- Goldsworthy family - (Electoral district of Kavel)
- Groom family - (Division of Darling Downs)
- Hanlon family - (Electoral district of Ithaca)
- Hodgman family - (Division of Denison), (Electoral division of Huon), (Division of Franklin)
- Holland family - (Electoral district of Flemington)
- Hunter family - (Electoral district of Lake Macquarie)
- James family - (Division of Hunter)
- Jenkins family - (Division of Scullin)
- Katter family - (Division of Kennedy)
- Knowles family - (Electoral district of Macquarie Fields)
- Lang family - (Electoral district of Auburn)
- Lawson family - (County of Cumberland)
- McColl family - (Electoral district of Mandurang)
- McGirr family - (Electoral district of Cootamundra)
- McIntyre/Fletcher family - (Electoral district of Cunningham)
- McKechnie family - (Electoral district of Carnarvon
- McLachlan family - (Electoral district of Wooroora)
- McLaurin family - (Electoral district of Hume)
- McLeod family - (Electoral district of Daylesford)
- McLeod family - (Electoral district of Portland)
- McVeigh family - (Division of Groom)
- Morgan family - (Electoral district of Warwick)
- Muller family - (Electoral district of Fassifern)
- Mutton family - (Electoral district of Coburg)
- Palaszczuk family - (Electoral district of Inala)
- Pratten family - (Division of Martin)
- Piesse family - (Electoral district of Katanning), (South-East Province)
- Pitt family - (Electoral district of Mulgrave)
- Rattray family - (Electoral division of Apsley)
- Riordan family - (Division of Kennedy)
- Row family - (Electoral district of Hinchinbrook)
- Russell family - (Electoral district of Dalby)
- Shannon family - (Electoral district of Light)
- Solomon family - (Electoral district of West Adelaide)
- Stephen family - (Electoral district of Canterbury)
- Stephens family - (Electoral district of South Brisbane)
- Street family - (Division of Corangamite)
- Sullivan family - (Electoral district of Stafford)
- Tanner family - (Electoral district of Caulfield)
- Tudehope family - (Electoral district of Epping)
- Watkins family - (Division of Newcastle)
- White family - (Division of Denison)
- Willmott family - (Electoral district of Sussex), (South-West Province)
- Wilson family - (Division of Sturt)

== A ==
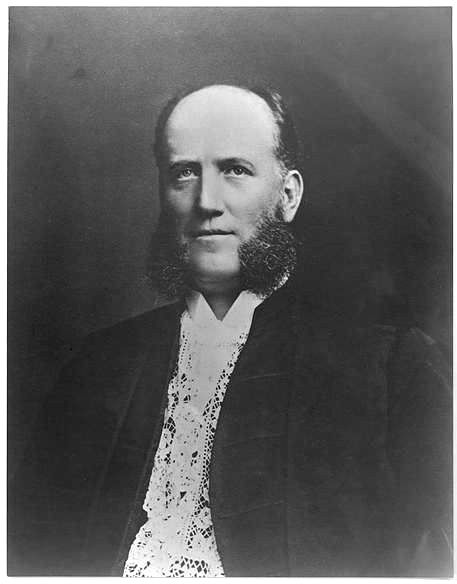
Sir Joseph Palmer Abbott (1842–1901)

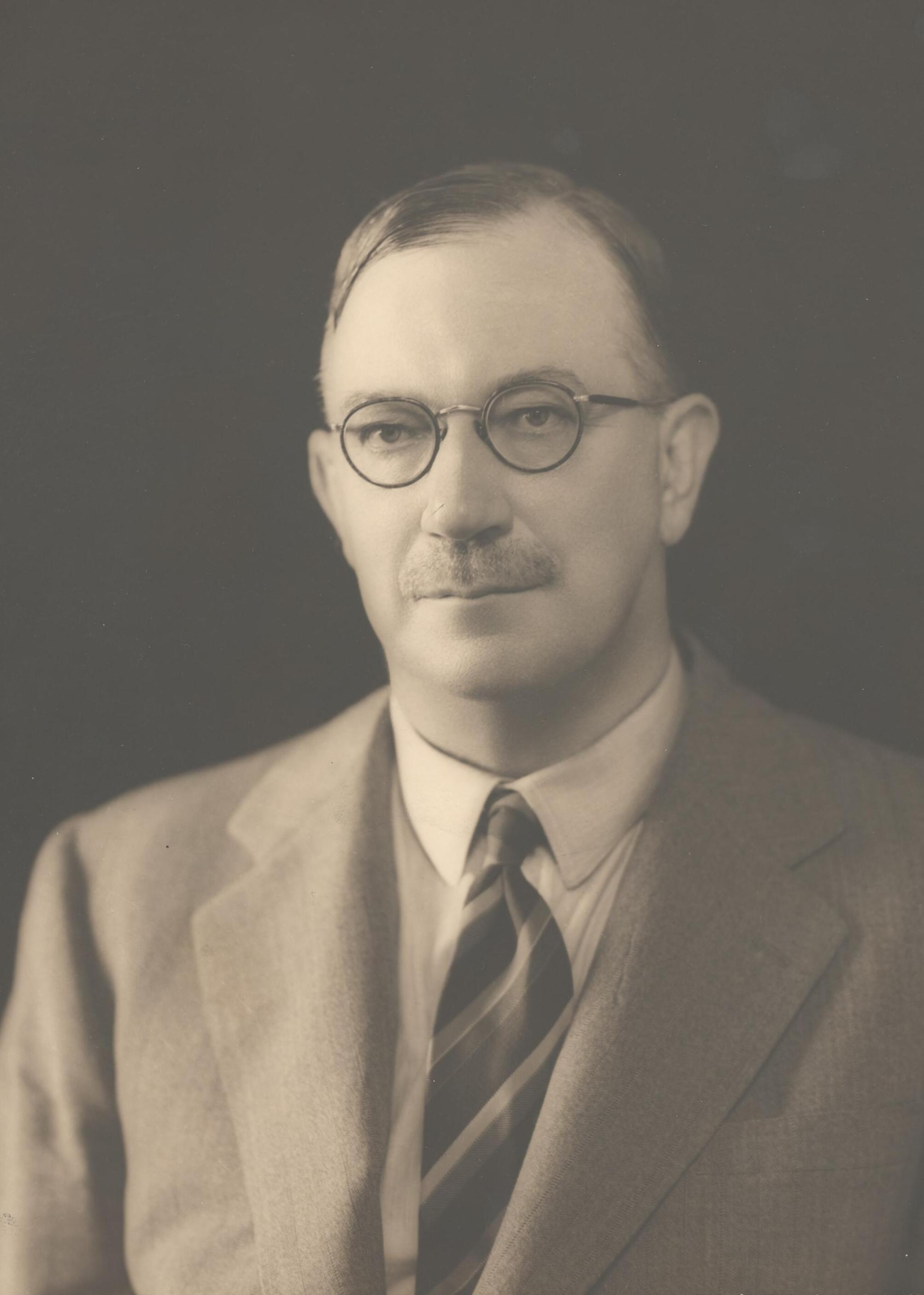
Joe Abbott (1891-1965)

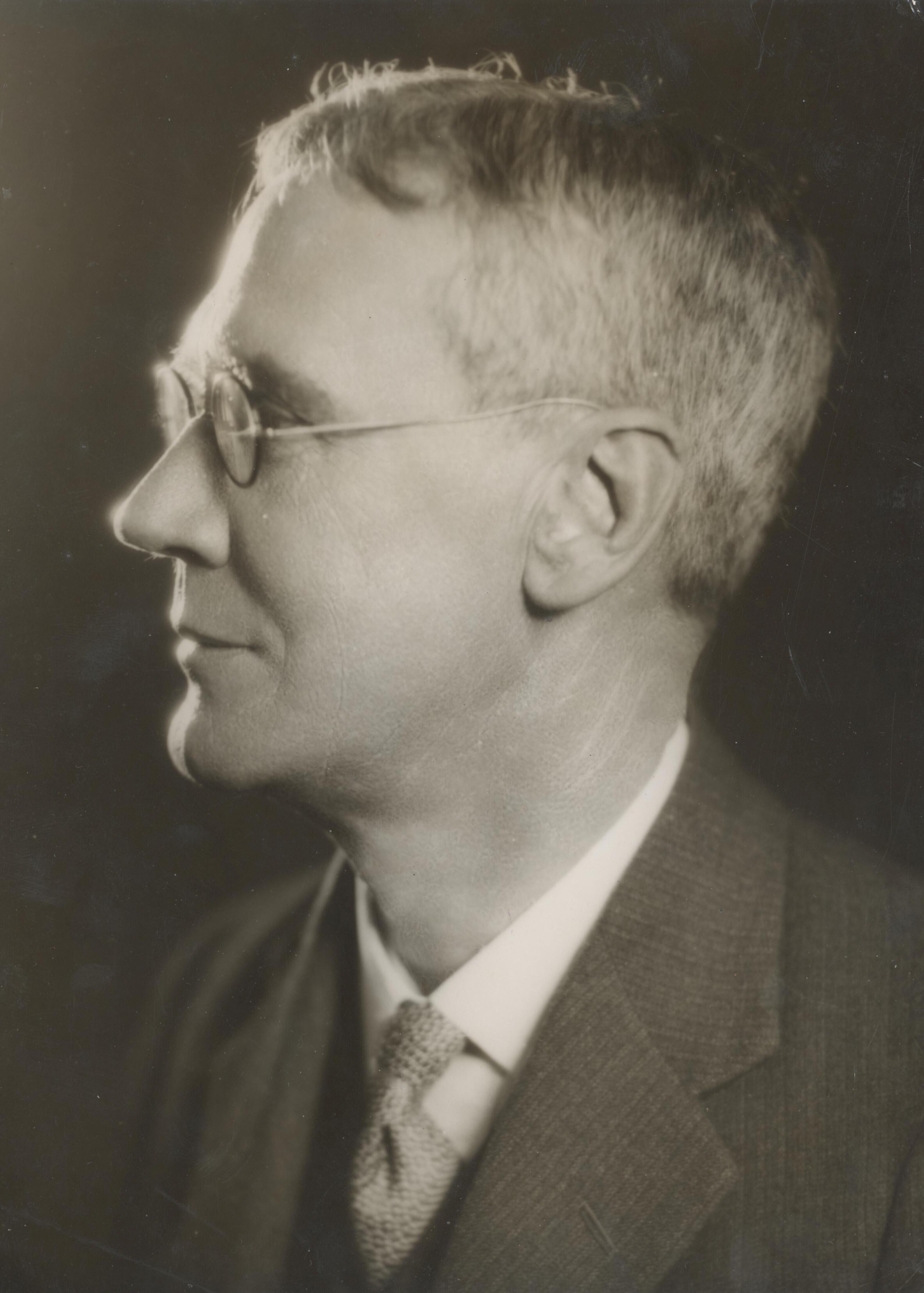
Mac Abbott (1877-1960)

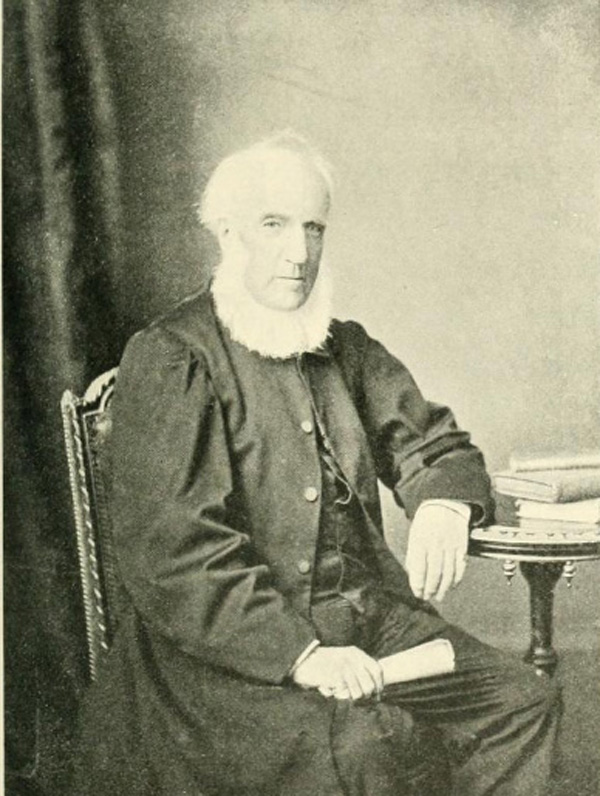
George Allen (1800–1877)

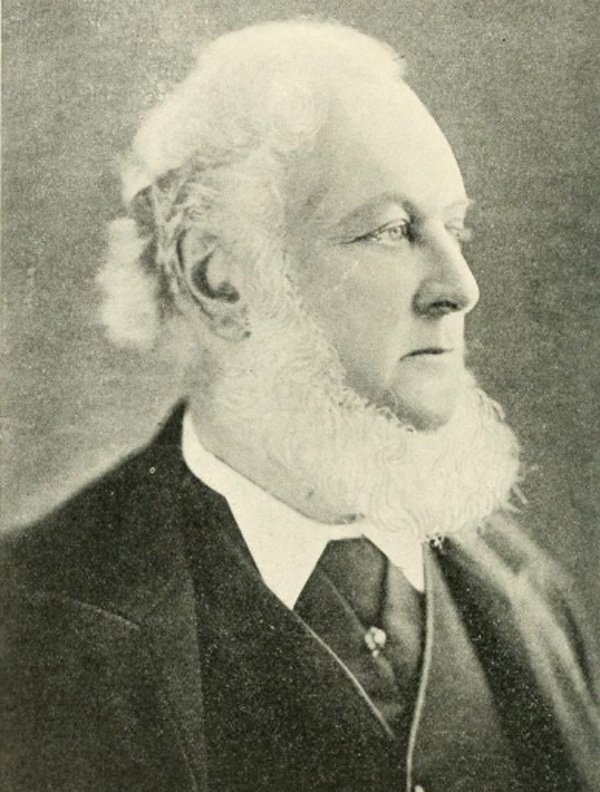
George Wigram Allen (1824–1885)

=== Abbott ===
- Robert Abbott (1830–1901), Member of the New South Wales Legislative Assembly for Tenterfield (1872–1877) and Hartley (1880–1885), Member of the New South Wales Legislative Council (1885–1888), Mayor of East St Leonards (1878–1879), minister in the Parkes government (1874–1875); His cousin:
- Joseph Abbott (1843–1903), Member of the New South Wales Legislative Assembly for Newtown (1888–1894) and Newtown-Camperdown (1894–1895); Robert Abbott's nephew:
  - Sir Joseph Palmer Abbott (1842–1901), Protectionist Member of the New South Wales Legislative Assembly for Gunnedah (1880–1887) and Wentworth (1887–1901), Speaker of the New South Wales Legislative Assembly (1890–1900), minister in the Stuart and Dibbs governments (1883–1885); His sons:
    - Joe Abbott (1891–1965), Country Member of the Australian House of Representatives for New England (1940–1949), minister in the Menzies and Fadden governments (1941); And:
    - Mac Abbott (1877–1960), Liberal/Nationalist/Country Senator for New South Wales (1935–1941), Member of the New South Wales Legislative Assembly for Upper Hunter (1913–1918); Their cousin:
    - Aubrey Abbott (1886–1975), Country Member of the Australian House of Representatives for Gwydir (1925–1929, 1931–1937), minister in the Bruce government (1928–1929), Administrator of the Northern Territory (1937–1946).

=== Abetz ===
- Eric Abetz (born 1958), Liberal Senator for Tasmania (1994–2022), minister in the Howard, Abbott and Turnbull governments (2001–2007, 2013–2015), Member of the Tasmanian House of Assembly for Franklin (2024–), minister in the Rockliff Government (2024–); His brother:
- Peter Abetz (born 1952), Liberal Member of the Western Australian Legislative Assembly for Southern River (2008–2017), Councillor for the City of Gosnells (2017–).

=== Adermann ===
- Sir Charles Adermann (1896–1979), Country Member of the Australian House of Representatives for Maranoa (1943–1949) and Fisher (1949–1972), minister in the Menzies (1958–1966) and Holt (1966–1967) governments; His son:
  - Evan Adermann (1927–2001), Country Member of the Australian House of Representatives for Fisher (1972–1984) and Fairfax (1984–1990), minister in the Fraser government (1975–1980); his nephew:
  - Greg Adermann, Liberal National Party of Queensland Councillor for Pullenvale Ward in the Brisbane City Council (2020–present).

=== Ah Kit ===
- Jack Ah Kit (1950–2020), Labor Member of the Northern Territory Legislative Assembly for Arnhem (1995–2005), minister in the Martin Government (2001–2005); His daughter:
  - Ngaree Ah Kit (1981–), Labor Member of the Northern Territory Legislative Assembly for Karama (2016–2024), Speaker of the Northern Territory Legislative Assembly (2020–2022), minister in the Fyles Government (2022–2024).

=== Aldred ===
- Ken Aldred (1945–2016), Liberal Member of the Australian House of Representatives for Henty (1975–1980), Bruce (1983–1990) and Deakin (1990–1996); His daughter:
  - Mary Aldred, Liberal Member of the Australian House of Representatives for Monash (2025-).

=== Allen ===
- George Allen (1800–1877), Member of the New South Wales Legislative Council (1846–1856, 1856–1877); His son:
  - Sir George Wigram Allen (1824–1885), Member of the New South Wales Legislative Council (1860–1861), Member of the New South Wales Legislative Assembly for Glebe (1869–1883), Speaker of the New South Wales Legislative Assembly (1875–1882), minister in the Parkes government (1872–1875).

=== Anderson ===
- Keith Anderson (1916–1965), Labor Member of the New South Wales Legislative Assembly (1961–1962); His wife:
- Kath Anderson (1921–1996), Labor Member of the New South Wales Legislative Council (1973–1981); Their son:
  - Peter Anderson (born 1947), Labor Member of the New South Wales Legislative Assembly for Nepean (1978–1981), Penrith (1981–1988), Liverpool (1989–1995), minister in the Unsworth Government (1986–1988).

=== Anthony ===
- Hubert Lawrence "Larry" Anthony (1897–1957), Country Member of the Australian House of Representatives for Richmond (1937–57), minister in the Menzies Government (1941, 1949–56); His son:
  - Doug Anthony (1929–2020), Country/Nationals Member of the Australian House of Representatives for Richmond (1957–84), Deputy Prime Minister of Australia (1971–72, 1975–83); His son:
    - Larry Anthony (born 1961), Nationals Member of the Australian House of Representatives for Richmond (1996–2004); minister in the Howard government (1998–2004).

=== Archer (Queensland) ===
- Archibald Archer (1820–1902), member of the Queensland Legislative Assembly for Rockhampton (1867–1869, 1888–1896) and Blackall (1878–1886), minister in the McIlwraith government (1882–1883); His brother:
- Thomas Archer (1823–1905), Agent-general for Queensland (1881–1885); Their nephew:
  - Edward Archer (1871–1940), Anti-Socialist/Liberal Member of the Australian House of Representatives for Capricornia (1906–1910), Member of the Queensland Legislative Assembly for Normanby (1914–1915).

=== Archer (Tasmania) ===
- Joseph Archer (1795–1853), Member of the Tasmanian Legislative Council (1847–1853); His brother:
- Thomas Archer (1790–1850), Member of the Tasmanian Legislative Council (1826–1845); His son:
  - William Archer (1820–1874), Member of the Tasmanian Legislative Council (1851–1855), Member of the Tasmanian House of Assembly for Deloraine (1860–1862, 1866–1868); His cousin:
  - Robert Joseph Archer (1832–1914), member of the Tasmanian House of Assembly for Ringwood (1869–1871); His brother:
  - William Henry Davies Archer (1836–1928), Member of the Tasmanian House of Assembly for Norfolk Plains (1882–1886); His cousin:
  - Basil Archer (1841–1923), Member of the Tasmanian House of Assembly for Ringwood (1871–1872); His cousin:
  - Frank Archer (1846–1902), Member of the Tasmanian House of Assembly for Selby (1893–1902).

=== Archer (Calder, Tasmania) ===
- Dick Archer (1927–2009), Independent Member of the Tasmanian Legislative Council for South Esk (1980–1992); His brother:
- Brian Archer (1929–2013), Liberal Senator for Tasmania (1975–1994).

=== Aston ===
- Sir William Aston (1916–1997), Liberal Speaker of the Australian House of Representatives (1967–1972), Member of the Australian House of Representatives for Phillip (1955–1961, 1963–1972); His son:
  - Ray Aston (1943–1988), Liberal Member of the New South Wales Legislative Assembly for Vaucluse (1986–1988), Minister in the Greiner government (1988).

=== Aylett ===
- Bill Aylett (1900–1976), Labor Senator for Tasmania (1938–1965); His brother:
- Charley Aylett (1913–1966), Labor Speaker of the Tasmanian House of Assembly (1959–1964), member of the Tasmanian House of Assembly for Darwin (1946–1959) and Denison (1959–1964).

== B ==
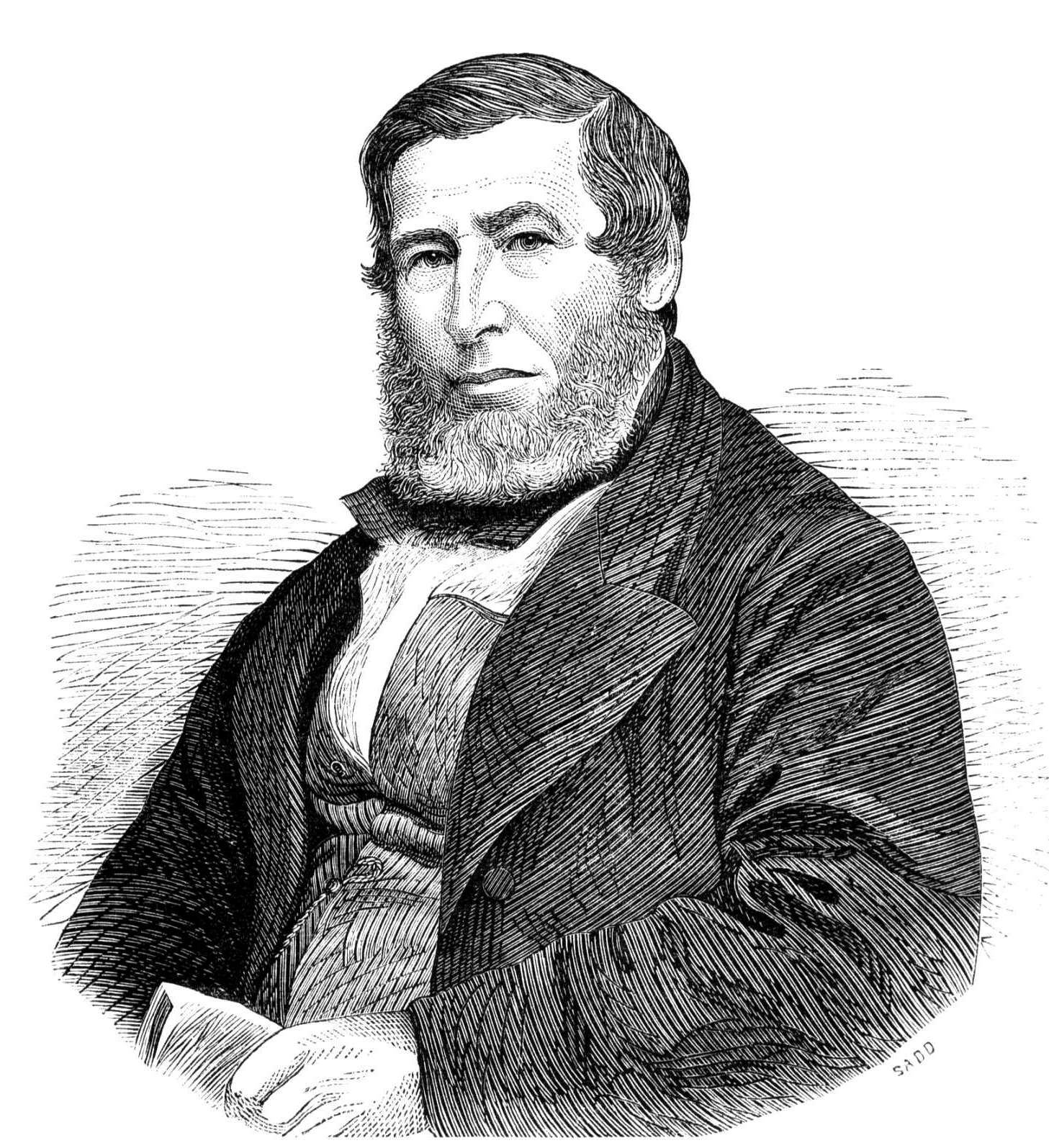
Thomas Turner à Beckett (1808–1892)

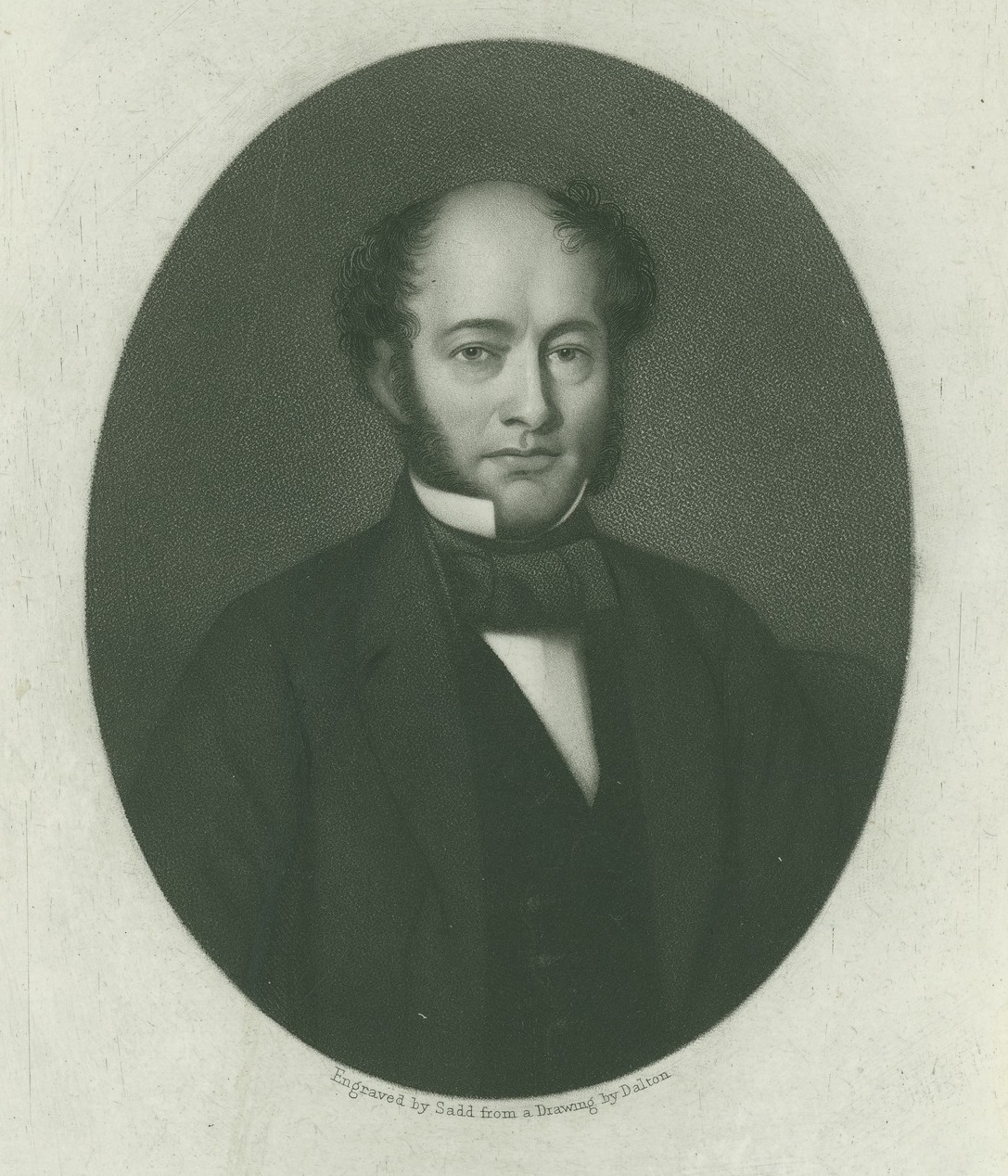
Sir William à Beckett (1806–1869)

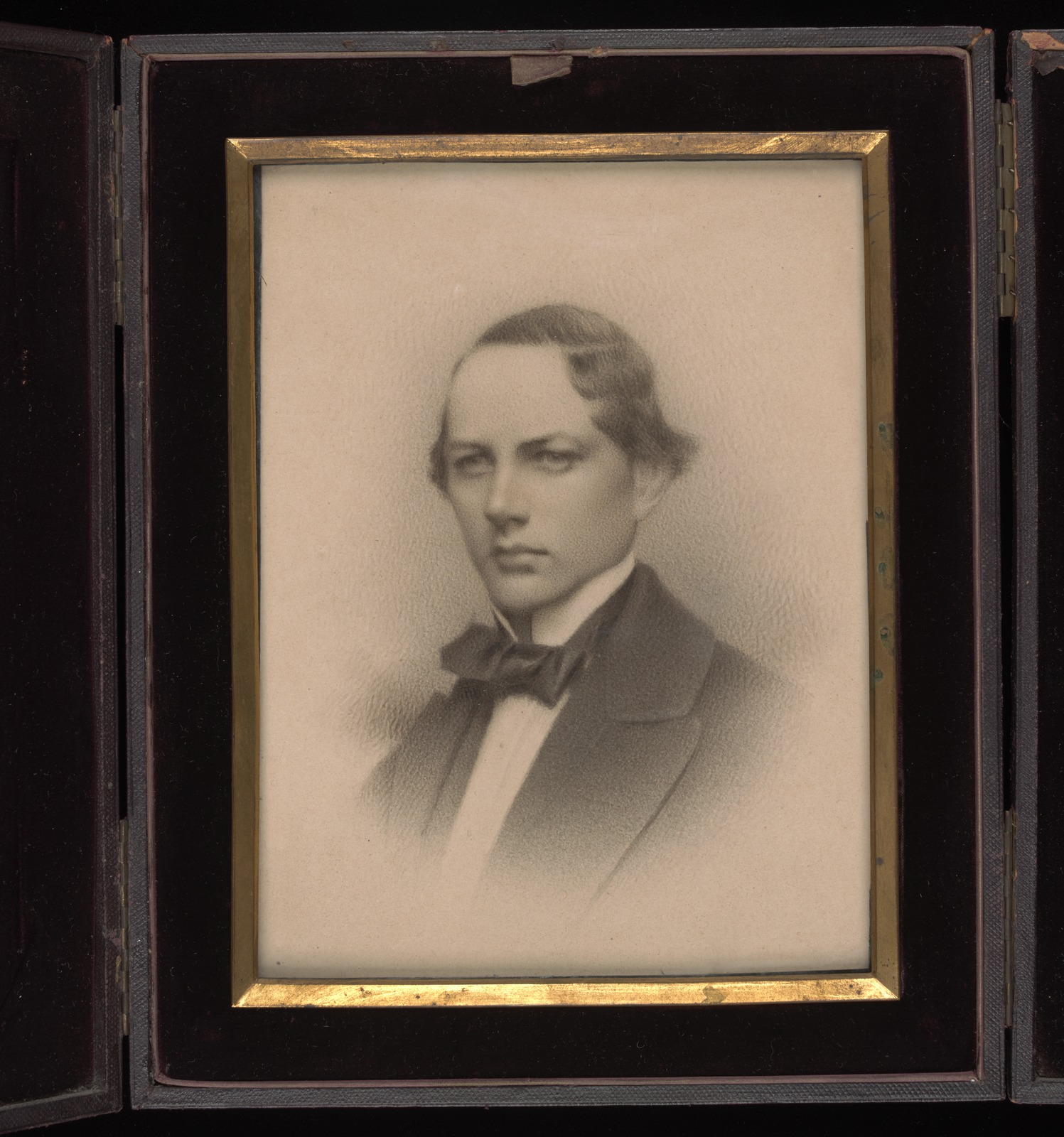
William Arthur Callender à Beckett (1833–1901)

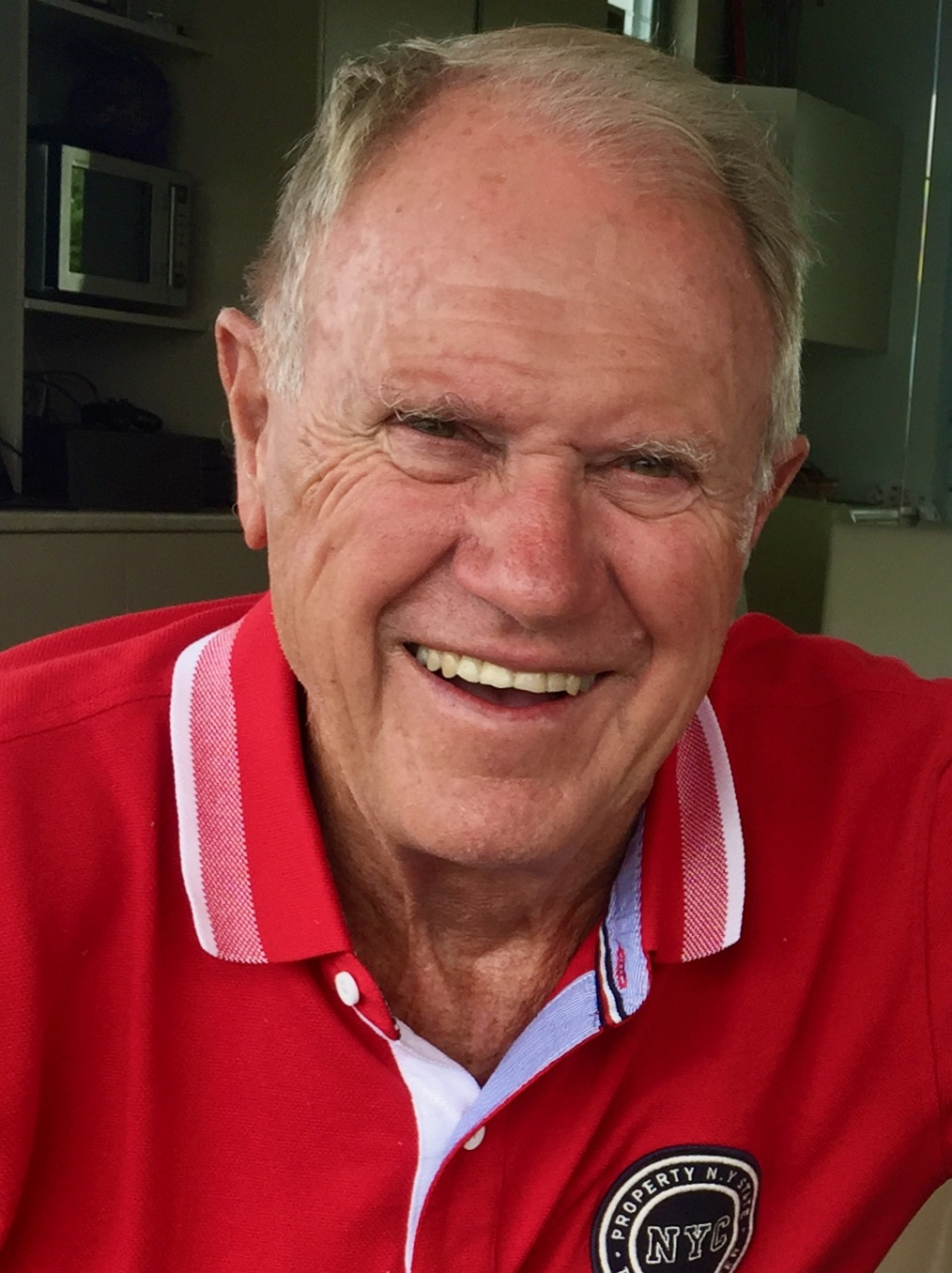
Bruce Baird (born 1942)

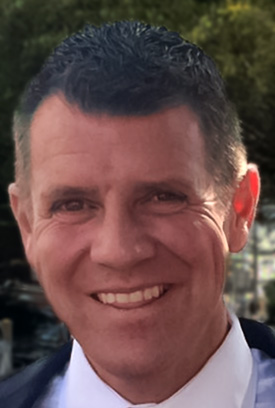
Mike Baird (born 1968)

=== à Beckett ===
- Thomas Turner à Beckett (1808–1892), Member of the Victorian Legislative Council for Central Province (1852–1856, 1858–1878), Commissioner of Trade and Customs (1870–1871), minister in the Heales government (1860–1861); His brother:
- Sir William à Beckett (1806–1869), Chief Justice of Victoria (1852–1857), Solicitor General for New South Wales (1841–1844); His son:
  - William Arthur Callendar à Beckett (1833–1901), Member of the Victorian Legislative Council for Southern Province (1868–1876), minister in the Berry government (1875).

=== Bacon ===
- Jim Bacon (1950–2004), Premier of Tasmania (1998–2004), Labor Member of the Tasmanian House of Assembly for Denison (1996–2004); His son:
  - Scott Bacon (1977–), Labor Member of the Tasmanian House of Assembly for Denison (2010–2018) and Clark (2018–2019), minister in the Giddings Government (2011–2014).

=== Badgery ===
- Henry Badgery (1840–1917), Independent Member of the New South Wales Legislative Assembly for East Maitland (1878–1880) and Monaro (1880–1885), minister in the Dibbs government (1880–1885); His brother:
- Frank Badgery (1852–1915), Liberal Member of the New South Wales Legislative Assembly for Wollondilly (1913–1915).

=== Baillieu ===
- Marshall Baillieu (born 1937), Liberal Member of the Australian House of Representatives for La Trobe (1975–1980); His cousin:
- Ted Baillieu (born 1953), Liberal Premier of Victoria (2010–2013), Member of the Victorian Legislative Assembly for Hawthorn (1999–2014), Leader of the Victorian Opposition (2006–2010).

=== Baird ===
- Bruce Baird (1942–2026), Liberal Member of the New South Wales Legislative Assembly for Northcott (1984–1995), minister in Greiner and Fahey governments (1988–1995), Member of the Australian House of Representatives for Cook (1998–2007); His son:
  - Mike Baird (born 1968), Liberal Premier of New South Wales (2014–2017), Member of the New South Wales Legislative Assembly for Manly (2007–2017), minister in the O'Farrell Government (2011–2014).

=== Baker (Queensland) ===
- Francis Patrick Baker (1873–1959), Labor Member of the Australian House of Representatives for Maranoa (1940–1943); His son:
  - Francis Matthew John Baker (1903–1939), Labor Member of the Australian House of Representatives for Oxley (1931–1934) and Griffith (1934–1939).

=== Baker (South Australia) ===
- John Baker (1813–1872), Premier of South Australia (1857), Member of the South Australian Legislative Council for Electoral district of Mount Barker (1851–1861, 1863–1872); His son:
  - Sir Richard Chaffey Baker (1842–1911), National Defence President of the Australian Senate (1901–1906), Senator for South Australia (1901–1906).

=== Barnard ===
- Claude Barnard (1890–1957), Labor Member of the Australian House of Representatives for Bass (1934–49), minister in the Chifley Government; His son:
  - Lance Barnard (1919–1997), Labor Deputy Prime Minister of Australia (1972–1974), Member of the Australian House of Representatives for Bass (1954–1975); His cousin:
  - Eric Barnard (1924–2017), Labor Member of the Tasmanian House of Assembly for Franklin (1959–1979), Speaker of the Tasmanian House of Assembly (1972–1975), minister in the Reece, Neilson and Lowe governments (1975–1979); Lance's nephew:
    - Michael Barnard (1942–1999), Labor Member of the Tasmanian House of Assembly for Bass (1969–1986); Deputy Premier of Tasmania (1980–1982), minister in the Neilson and Lowe governments (1975–1980).

=== Barnes ===
- George Barnes (1908–1935), Liberal/Progressive National Member of the Queensland Legislative Assembly for Warwick (1908–1935); His brother:
- Walter Barnes (1858–1933), Progressive National/National Member of the Queensland Legislative Assembly for Bulimba (1901–1915, 1918–1923) and Wynnum (1923–1933), minister in the Denham (1911–1915) and Moore (1929–1932) governments.

=== Basedow ===
- Martin Peter Friedrich Basedow (1829–1902), Independent Member of the South Australian House of Assembly for Barossa (1876–1890), Member of the South Australian Legislative Council for the North-Eastern District (1894–1900); His son:
  - Herbert Basedow (1881–1933), Independent Member of the South Australian House of Assembly for Barossa (1927–1930, 1933).

=== Baume ===
- Michael Baume (born 1930), Member of the Australian House of Representatives for Macarthur (1975–1983), Australian Senator for New South Wales (1985–1996); His cousin:
- Peter Baume (born 1935), Australian Senator for New South Wales (1974–1991), minister in the Fraser Government (1980–1983).

=== Beale ===
- Sir Howard Beale (1898–1983), Liberal Member of the Australian House of Representatives for Parramatta (1946–1958), minister in the Menzies Government (1949–1958), Ambassador of Australia to the United States (1958–1964); His son:
  - Julian Beale (1934–2021), Liberal Member of the Australian House of Representatives for Deakin (1984–90) and Bruce (1990–96).

=== Beazley ===
- Kim Edward Beazley (1917–2007), Labor Member of the Australian House of Representatives for Fremantle (1945–1977), minister in the Whitlam government (1972–1975); His son:
  - Kim Christian Beazley (born 1948), Labor Deputy Prime Minister of Australia 1995–96, Leader of the Opposition (1996–2001, 2005–2006), minister in the Hawke–Keating government (1983–1996), Member of the Australian House of Representatives for Swan (1980–1996) and Brand (1996–2007), Australian Ambassador to the United States (2010–2016), Governor of Western Australia (2018–2022); His daughter:
    - Hannah Mary Beazley (born 1979), Labor Member of the Western Australian Legislative Assembly for Victoria Park (2021–), minister in the Cook Government (2023–).

=== Beerworth ===
- Fred Beerworth (1886–1968), Labor Senator for South Australia (1946–1951); His brother:
- James Beerworth (1884–1959), Labor Member of the South Australian House of Assembly for Newcastle (1933–1938), Member of the South Australian Legislative Council (1939–1947).

=== Bell (Queensland) ===
- John Alexander Bell (1829–1901), Member of the Queensland Legislative Council (1866–1872); His brother:
- Joshua Peter Bell (1827–1881), Member of the Queensland Legislative Assembly for West Moreton (1862–1868), Northern Downs (1868–1873, 1878–1879) and Dalby (1873–1878), member of the Queensland Legislative Council (1879–1881), President of the Queensland Legislative Council (1879–1881), Treasurer of Queensland (1864–1866, 1871–1874); His son:
  - Joshua Thomas Bell (1863–1911), Member of the Queensland Legislative Assembly for Dalby (1893–1911), Speaker of the Queensland Legislative Assembly (1909–1911).

=== Bell (New South Wales) ===
- Archibald Bell Sr. (1773–1837), Member of the New South Wales Legislative Council (1832–1837); His son:
  - Archibald Bell Jr. (1804–1883), Member of the New South Wales Legislative Assembly for Upper Hunter (1868–1872), Member of the New South Wales Legislative Council (1879–1883).

=== Berry ===
- Wayne Berry (born 1942), Labor Member of the Australian Capital Territory Legislative Assembly for Ginninderra (1989–2008), Leader of the Opposition (1997–1998), Speaker of the Australian Capital Territory Legislative Assembly (2001–2008); His daughter:
  - Yvette Berry (born 1968), Labor Member of the Australian Capital Territory Legislative Assembly for Ginninderra (2012–), Deputy Chief Minister of the Australian Capital Territory (2016–2026).

=== Best ===
- Percy Best (1873–1943), Nationalist Member of the Tasmanian House of Assembly for Wilmot (1928–1931), Independent Member of the Tasmanian Legislative Council for Meander (1935–1943); His son:
  - Charles Best (1909–1996), Liberal Member of the Tasmanian House of Assembly for Wilmot (1950–1958), Independent Member of the Tasmanian Legislative Council for Meander (1958–1971); His sister:
  - Amelia "Millie" Best (1900–1979), Liberal Member of the Tasmanian House of Assembly for Wilmot (1955–1956, 1958–1959).

=== Birney ===
- Jack Birney (1928–1995), Liberal Member of the Australian House of Representatives for Phillip) (1975–1983); His son:
  - Matthew Birney (born 1969), Liberal Member of the Western Australian Legislative Assembly for Kalgoorlie (2001–2008), Leader of the Opposition of Western Australia (2005–2006).

=== Blaxland ===
- John Blaxland (1769–1845), Member of the New South Wales Legislative Council (1829–1844); His nephew:
  - John Blaxland (1801–1884), Member of the New South Wales Legislative Council (1863–1884).

=== Blyth ===
- Sir Arthur Blyth (1823–1891), Premier of South Australia (1864–1865, 1871–1872, 1873–1875), Member of the South Australian House of Assembly for Gumeracha (1857–1868, 1870–-1875) and North Adelaide (1875–1877), Member of the South Australian Legislative Council for Yatala (1855–1857), minister in the Baker, Hanson and Waterhouse governments (1857–1864), minister in the Boucaut and Hart governments (1866–1868, 1870–1871); Agent-General for South Australia (1877–1891); His brother:
- Neville Blyth (1825–1890), Member of the South Australian House of Assembly for East Torrens (1860–1867), Encounter Bay (1867–1870), Victoria (1871), and North Adelaide (1877–1878), minister in the Hart (1868) and Boucaut (1877–1878) governments.

=== Booth ===
- George Booth (1891–1960), Labor Member of the New South Wales Legislative Assembly for Newcastle (1925–1927) and Kurri Kurri (1927–1960); His son:
  - Ken Booth (1926–1988), Labor Member of the New South Wales Legislative Assembly for Kurri Kurri (1960–1968) and Wallsend (1968–1988), minister in the Wran and Unsworth governments (1976–1988).

=== Bowman ===
- William Bowman (1800–1874), Member of the New South Wales Legislative Council for Cumberland Boroughs (1843–1851, 1853–1856), Member of the New South Wales Legislative Assembly for Cumberland Buroughs (1856–1858); His brother:
- George Bowman (1795–1878), Member of the New South Wales Legislative Council for County of Northumberland (1851–1856); His son:
  - Alexander Bowman (1838–1892), Member of the New South Wales Legislative Assembly for Electoral district of Hawkesbury (1877–1882, 1885–1892).

=== Braid ===
- Ian Braid (born 1935), Liberal Member of the Tasmanian House of Assembly for Wilmot/Lyons (1969–1972, 1975–1995), minister in the Gray (1982–1989) and Groom (1993–1995) governments; His cousin:
- Harry Braid (1917–2001), Independent Member of the Tasmanian Legislative Council for Mersey (1972–1990), President of the Tasmanian Legislative Council (1983–1984); his daughter:
  - Sue Napier (1948–2010), Liberal Member of the Tasmanian House of Assembly for Bass (1992–2010), Deputy Premier of Tasmania and minister in the Rundle Government (1996–1998).

=== Brennan ===
- Tom Brennan (1866–1944), UAP Senator for Victoria (1931–1938), minister in the Lyons government (1934–1937); His brother:
- Frank Brennan (1873–1950), Labor Member of the Australian House of Representatives for Batman (1911–1931, 1934–1949), minister in the Scullin government (1929–1932).

=== Briskey ===
- Darryl Briskey (born 1955), Labor Member of the Legislative Assembly of Queensland for Redlands (1989–1992) and Cleveland (1992–2006); His daughter:
  - Jo Briskey, Labor Member of the Australian House of Representatives for Maribyrnong (2025–)

=== Brown/Hoare ===
- Bob Brown (1933–2022), Labor Member of the New South Wales Legislative Assembly for Cessnock (1978–1980), Member of the Australian House of Representatives for Hunter (1980–1984) and Charlton (1984–1998), minister in the Hawke and Keating governments (1988–1993); His daughter:
  - Kelly Hoare (1963–2024), Labor member of the Australian House of Representatives for Charlton (1998–2007).

=== Brown/Ritchie ===
- Carol Brown (born 1963), Labor Senator for Tasmania (2005–), assistant minister in the Albanese Government (2022–2024); Her nieces:
  - Allison Ritchie (born 1974), Labor Member of the Tasmanian Legislative Council for Pembroke (2001–2009), Independent Councillor for the City of Clarence (2022–); and:
  - Meg Brown (born 1992), Labor Member of the Tasmanian House of Assembly for Franklin (2024–).

=== Broughton ===
- Alfred Broughton (1826–1895), Member of the Queensland Legislative Assembly for West Moreton (1860); His son:
  - Ernest Broughton (1865–1917), Progressive/Liberal Reform Member of the New South Wales Legislative Assembly for Sydney-King (1901–1904) and King (1904–1910), Mayor of Ashfield (1901–1902).

=== Broun ===
- Peter Broun (1797–1846), Colonial Secretary of Western Australia (1828–1846); His grandson:
  - Frank Broun (1876–1930), Liberal/Country Member of the Western Australian Legislative Assembly for Electoral district of Beverley (1911–1914, 1917–1924), Colonial Secretary of Western Australia (1919–1922), minister in the Mitchell government (1919–1922).

=== Bruxner ===
- Sir Michael Bruxner (1882–1970), Progressive/Country Member of the New South Wales Legislative Assembly for Northern Tablelands (1920–1927) and Tenterfield (1927–1962), Deputy Premier of New South Wales (1932–1941), minister in the Bavin (1927–1930), Stevens (1932–1939) and Mair (1939–1941) governments; His son:
  - Tim Bruxner (1923–2017), Country Member of the New South Wales Legislative Assembly for Tenterfield (1962–1981), minister in the Askin, Lewis and Willis governments (1973–1976).

=== Bull ===
- Tom Bull (1905–1976), Country Senator for New South Wales (1965–1971); His son:
  - Richard Bull (born 1946), National Member of the New South Wales Legislative Council (1984–2000).

=== Burdekin ===
- Marshall Burdekin (1837–1886), Member of the New South Wales Legislative Assembly for Liverpool Plains (1863–1864), The Williams (1864–1866) and East Sydney (1867–1869), minister in the Cowper government (1866); His brother:
- Sydney Burdekin (1839–1899), Free Trade Member of the New South Wales Legislative Assembly for Tamworth (1880–1882), East Sydney (1884–1891) and Hawkesbury (1892–1894), Mayor of Sydney (1890–1891).

=== Burke ===
- Tom Burke (1910–1973), Labor Member of the Australian House of Representatives for Perth (1943–1955); His sons:
  - Terry Burke (born 1942), Labor Member of the Western Australian Legislative Assembly for Perth (1968–1987); and:
  - Brian Burke (born 1947), Labor Premier of Western Australia (1983–1988), Member of the Western Australian Legislative Assembly for Balcatta (1973–1974, 1983–1988) and Balga (1974–1977, 1983–1988).

=== Bushby ===
- Max Bushby (1927–1994), Liberal Member of the Tasmanian House of Assembly for Bass (1961–1986), Speaker of the Tasmanian House of Assembly (1982–1986); His children:
  - David Bushby (born 1965), Liberal Senator for Tasmania (2007–2019), Consul-General of Australia in Chicago (2019–);
  - Wendy Askew (born 1963), Liberal Senator for Tasmania (2019–2026).

=== Butler ===
- Sir Richard B. Butler (1850–1925), Conservative/Liberal Premier of South Australia (1905), Member of the South Australian House of Assembly for Yatala (1890–1902) and Barossa (1902–1924), minister in the Kingston, Jenkins and Peake governments; His son:
  - Sir Richard L. Butler (1885–1966), Liberal Premier of South Australia (1927–1930, 1933–1938), Member of the South Australian House of Assembly for Wooroora (1915–1918, 1921–1938) and Light (1938); His great-grandson:
    - Mark Butler (born 1970), Labor Member of the Australian House of Representatives for Port Adelaide (2007–2019) and Hindmarsh (2019–), minister in the Gillard (2010–2013), Rudd (2013) and Albanese (2022–) governments.

=== Buzacott ===
- Richard Buzacott (1867–1933), Labor/Nationalist Senator for Western Australia (1910–1923), Member of the Western Australian Legislative Assembly for Menzies (1908); His brother:
- Nicholas Buzacott (1866–1933), Labor/Nationalist Member of the New South Wales Legislative Council (1899–1933), Mayor of Newtown (1923–1924).

=== Byrnes ===
- William Byrnes (1809–1891), Member of the New South Wales Legislative Council (1858–1861, 1861–1891); His brother:
- James Byrnes (1806–1886), Member of the New South Wales Legislative Council for County of Cumberland (1850–1851), Member of the New South Wales Legislative Assembly for Cumberland (South Riding) (1857), Parramatta (1858–1861, 1864–1872), Mayor of Parramatta (1862–1866), minister in the Martin government (1865–1872); His son:
  - Charles Byrnes (1835–1917), Member of the New South Wales Legislative Assembly for Parramatta (1874–1877, 1880–1882), Mayor of Parramatta (1870–1871, 1875–1882, 1886–1889, 1892–1894, 1895–1896).

== C ==
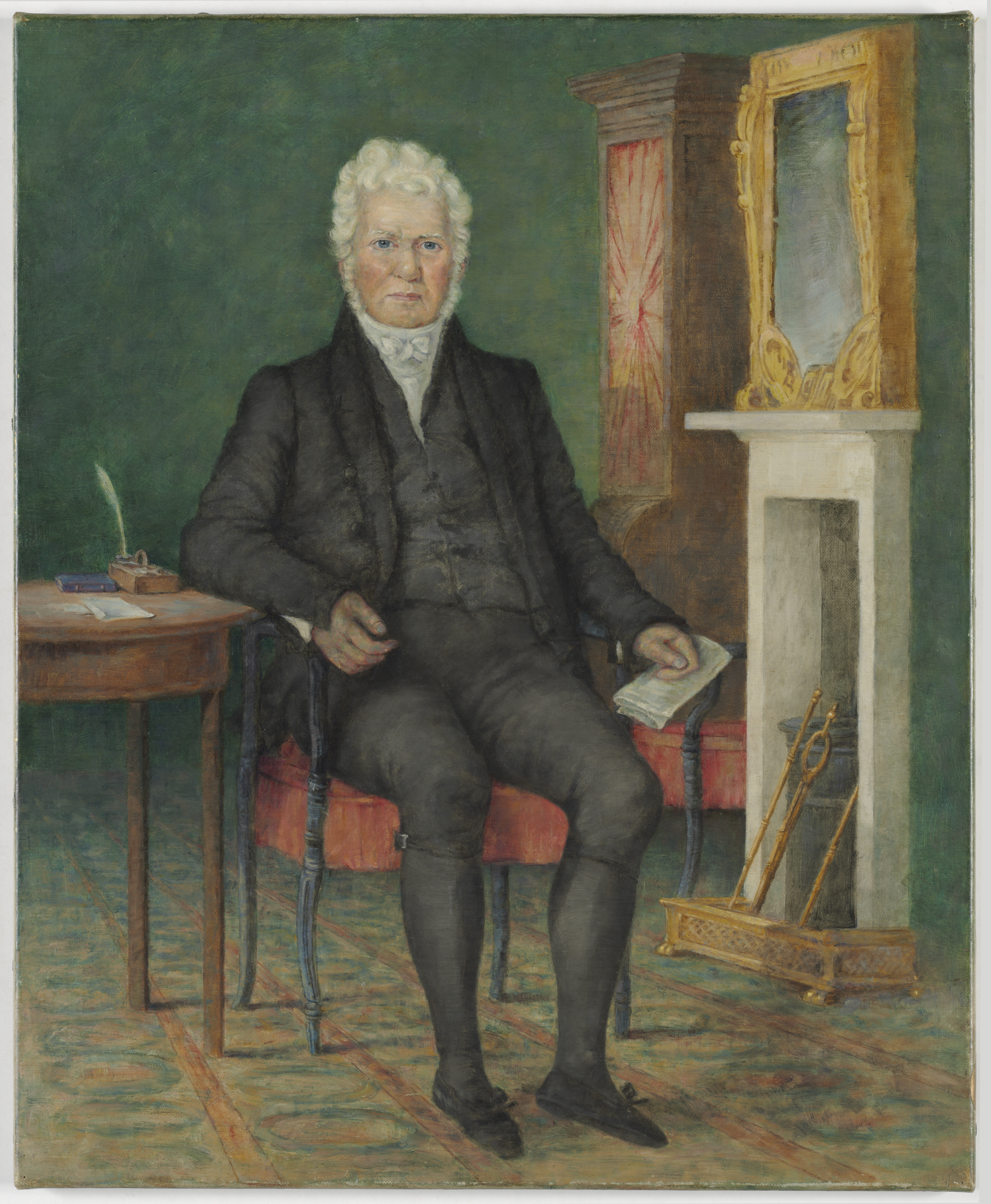
Robert Campbell (1769–1846)

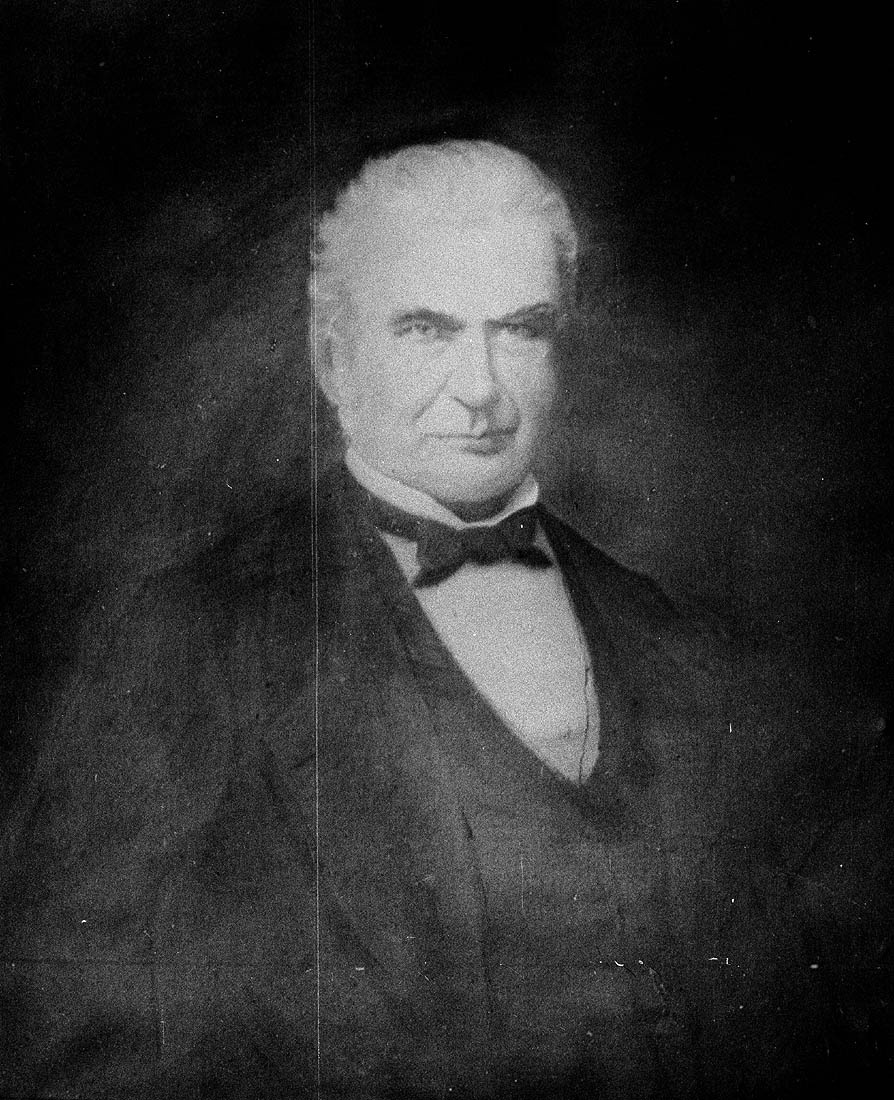
Charles Campbell (1810–1888)

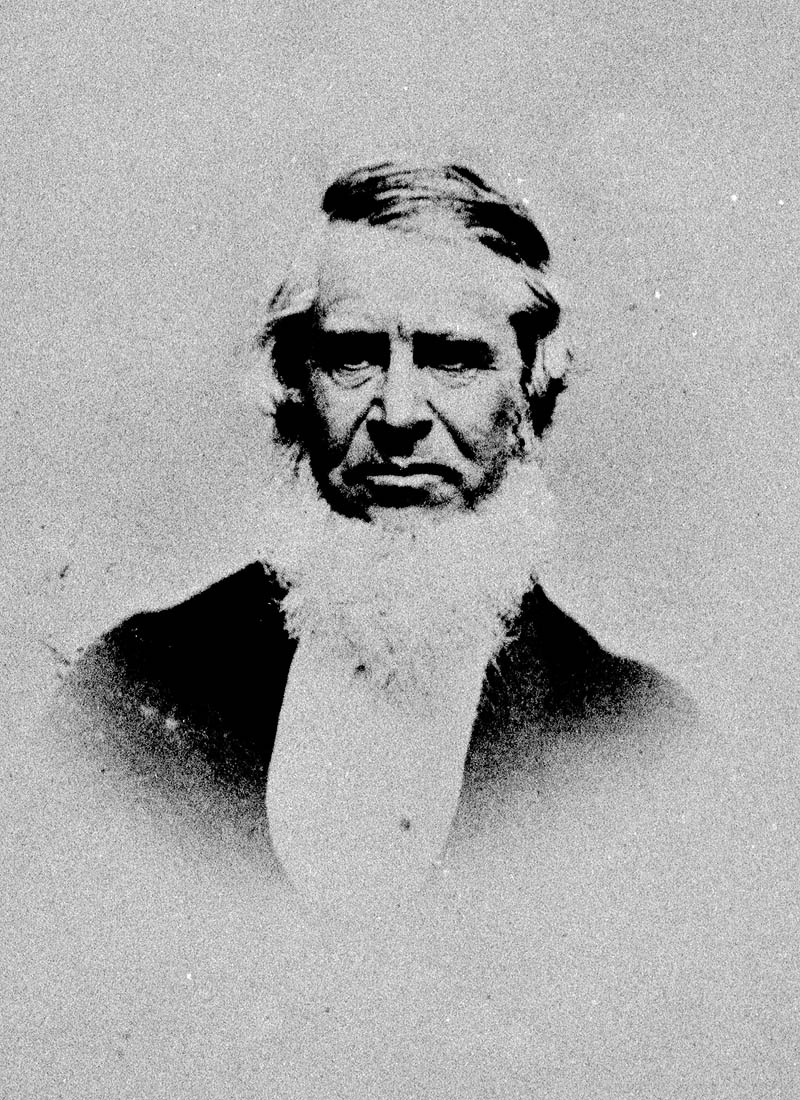
John Campbell (1802–1886)

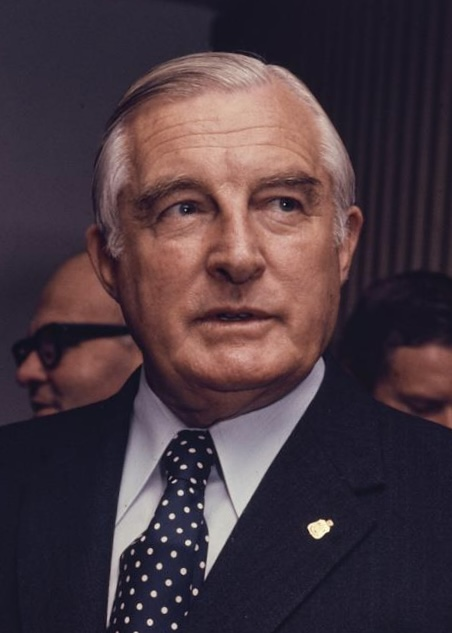
Sir Charles Court (1911–2007)

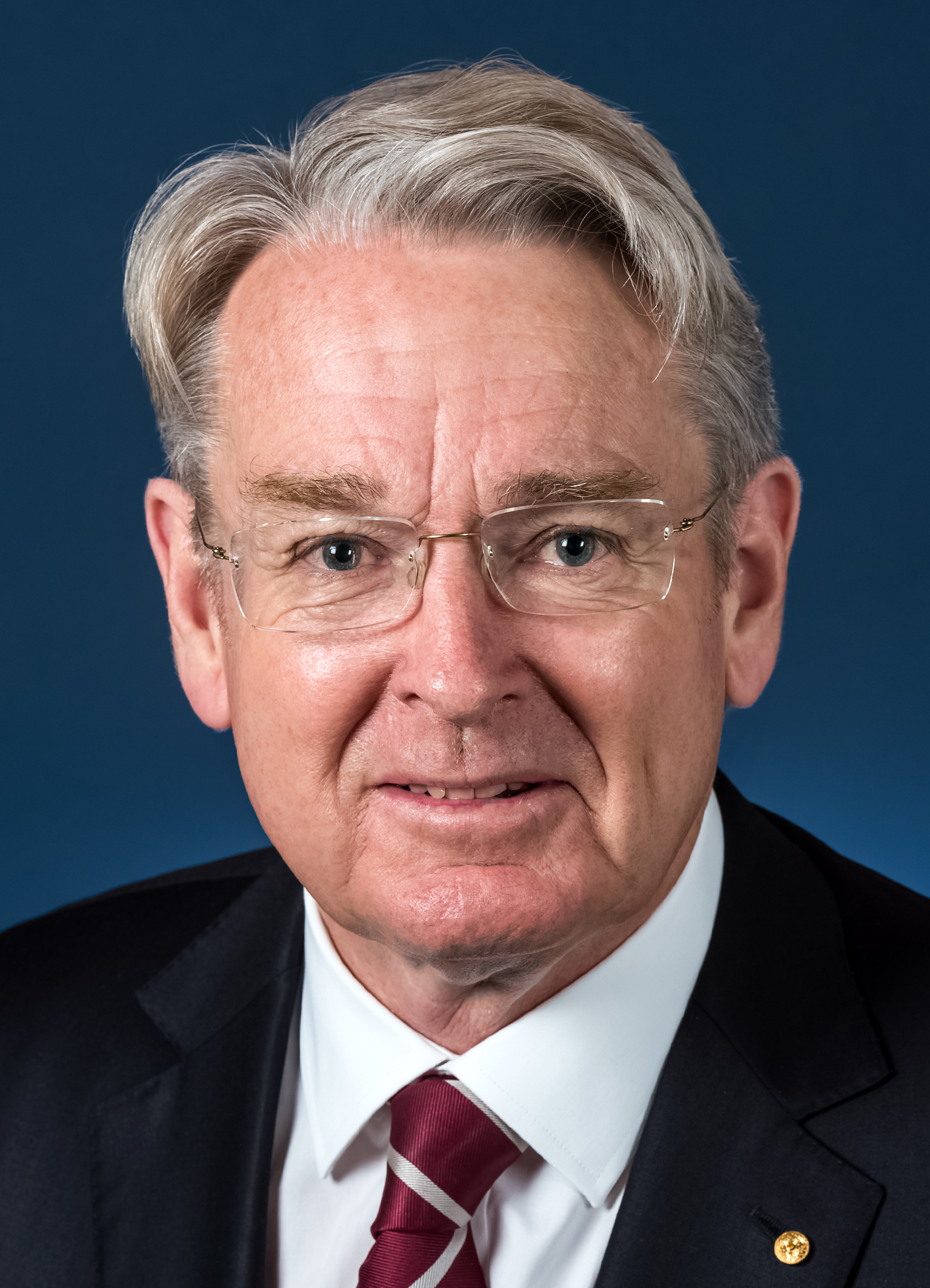
Richard Court (born 1947)

=== Cain ===
- John Cain (senior) (1882–1957), Labor Premier of Victoria (1943, 1945–1947, 1952–1955), Member of the Victorian Legislative Assembly for Jika Jika (1917–1927) and Northcote) (1927–1957); His son:
  - John Cain (junior) (1931–2019), Labor Premier of Victoria (1982–90), Member of the Victorian Legislative Assembly for Bundoora (1976–92).

=== Cameron (Queensland) ===
- John Cameron (1845–1914), Member of the Queensland Legislative Assembly for Mitchell (1893–1896) and Brisbane North (1901–1908); His son:
  - Sir Donald Cameron (1879–1960), Nationalist/UAP Member of the Australian House of Representatives for Brisbane (1919–1931) and Lilley (1934–1937).

=== Cameron (South Australia) ===
- Don Cameron (1914–1998), Labor Senator for South Australia (1969–1978); His brother:
- Clyde Cameron (1913–2008), Labor Member of the Australian House of Representatives for Hindmarsh (1949–1980), minister in the Whitlam government (1972–1975).

=== Cameron (Tasmania) ===
- Donald Cameron (1814–1890), Member of the Tasmanian Legislative Council for North Esk (1868–1886); His sons:
  - Cyril Cameron (1857–1941), Protectionist/Commonwealth Liberal Senator for Tasmania (1901–1903, 1907–1913); And:
  - Norman Cameron (1851–1931), Free Trade Member of the Australian House of Representatives for Tasmania (1901–1903) and Wilmot (1904–1906), Member of the Tasmanian House of Assembly for Wilmot (1912–1913, 1925–1928); His son:
    - Donald Keith Cameron (1887–1967), Nationalist member of the Tasmanian House of Assembly for Wilmot (1934–1937).

=== Camm ===
- Ron Camm (1914–1988), Country/Nationals Member of the Queensland Legislative Assembly for Whitsunday (1961–1980), minister in the Nicklin, Chalk and Bjelke-Petersen governments (1965–1980); His great-niece:
  - Amanda Camm (born 1979), Liberal National Member of the Queensland Legislative Assembly for Whitsunday (2020–).

=== Campbell ===
- Robert Campbell (1769–1846), Member of the New South Wales Legislative Council (1825–1843); His sons:
  - Charles Campbell (1810–1888), Member of the New South Wales Legislative Council (1870–1888); And:
  - John Campbell (1802–1886), Member of the New South Wales Legislative Council (1856, 1861–1886), Member of the New South Wales Legislative Assembly for Sydney Hamlets (1856–1859) and Glebe (1859–1860); And:
  - Robert Campbell (1804–1859), Member of the New South Wales Legislative Council for City of Sydney (1851–1856), Member of the New South Wales Legislative Assembly for Sydney City (1856–1859); His son:
    - William Campbell (1838–1906), Member of the New South Wales Legislative Assembly for West Sydney (1868–1869) and Gwydir (1880–1886), Member of the New South Wales Legislative Council (1890–1906).

=== Cann ===
- John Cann (1860–1940), Labor Member of the New South Wales Legislative Assembly for Sturt (1891–1894, 1913–1916) and Broken Hill (1894–1913), minister in the McGowen and Holman governments (1912–1915); His brother:
- George Cann (1871–1948), Labor Member of the Australian House of Representatives for Nepean (1910–1913), Member of the New South Wales Legislative Assembly for Canterbury (1914–1920) and St George (1920–1927), minister in the Storey and Dooley governments (1920–1921), minister in the Lang government (1925–1927).

=== Casey ===
- Richard Casey (1846–1919), Member of the Queensland Legislative Assembly for Warrego (1888–1893); His son:
  - The Lord Casey (1890–1976), Governor-General of Australia (1965–1969), Governor of Bengal (1944–1946), Member of the House of Lords (1960–1976), Ambassador of Australia to the United States (1940–1942), UAP/Liberal Member of the Australian House of Representatives for Corio (1931–1940) and La Trobe (1949–1960), minister in the Lyons (1935–1939) and Menzies (1949–1960) governments.

=== Catania ===
- Nick Catania (born 1945), Labor Member of the Western Australian Legislative Assembly for Balcatta (1989–1996), Mayor of Vincent (2001–2011); His sons:
  - Vince Catania (born 1977), Labor/Nationals Member of the Western Australian Legislative Council for Mining and Pastoral Region (2005–2008), Member of the Western Australian Legislative Assembly for North West (2008–2013) and North West Central (2013–2022); And:
  - Steve Catania, Labor Member of the Western Australian Legislative Assembly for Midland (2025- ).

=== Chaffey ===
- Frank Chaffey (1888–1940), Nationalist/UAP Member of the New South Wales Legislative Assembly for Namoi (1920–1927) and Tamworth (1913–1920, 1927–1940), minister in the Fuller (1922–1925), Bavin (1927–1930) and Stevens (1932–1938) governments; His son:
  - Bill Chaffey (1915–1987), UAP/Country Member of the New South Wales Legislative Assembly for Tamworth (1940–1973), minister in the Askin government (1965–1968).

=== Chaney ===
- Sir Fred Chaney I (1914–2001), Liberal Member of the Australian House of Representatives for Perth) (1955–69), Lord Mayor of Perth (1978–82), minister in the Menzies and Holt governments (1964–1966), Administrator of the Northern Territory (1970–1973); His son:
  - Fred Chaney (born 1941), Liberal Senator for Western Australia (1974–1990), Member of the Australian House of Representatives for Pearce (1990–93), minister in the Fraser government (1978–1983); His niece:
    - Kate Chaney (born 1975), Independent Member of the Australian House of Representatives for Curtin) (2022–).

=== Chanter ===
- John Chanter (1845–1931), Protectionist/Labor/Nationalist Member of the Australian House of Representatives for Riverina (1901–1903, 1904–1913, 1914–1922), Member of the New South Wales Legislative Assembly for Murray (1885–1894) and Deniliquin (1894–1901), minister in the Dibbs government (1889).
  - John Courtenay Chanter (1881–1962), Labor Member of the New South Wales Legislative Assembly for Lachlan (1943–1947).

=== Chapman ===
- Ted Chapman (1934–2005), Liberal Member of the South Australian House of Assembly for Alexandra) (1973–1992), minister in the Tonkin government (1979–1982); His daughter:
  - Vickie Chapman (born 1957), Liberal Member of the South Australian House of Assembly for Bragg (2002–2022), minister in the Marshall government (2018–2022).

=== Chataway ===
- James Vincent Chataway (1852–1901), Ministerialist Member of the Queensland Legislative Assembly for Mackay (1893–1901); His brother:
- Thomas Drinkwater Chataway (1864–1925), Liberal Senator for Queensland (1907–1913).

=== Clark ===
- George Clark (1834–1907), Member of the Queensland Legislative Assembly for Warwick (1867–1868); His brother:
- Charles Clark (1832–1896), Member of the Queensland Legislative Assembly for Warwick (1871–1873).

=== Clarke ===
- William John Turner Clarke (1805–1874), Member of the Victorian Legislative Council for Southern Province (1856–1861, 1863–1870); His son:
  - Sir William John Clarke (1831–1897), Member of the Victorian Legislative Council for Southern Province (1878–1897).

=== Corcoran ===
- Jim Corcoran (1885–1965), Labor Member of the South Australian House of Assembly for Victoria (1945–1947, 1953–1956) and Millicent (1956–1962); His son:
  - Des Corcoran (1928–2004), Labor Premier of South Australia (1979), Member of the South Australian House of Assembly for Millicent (1962–1975), Coles (1975–1977) and Hartley (1977–1982), minister in the Dunstan government (1968, 1970–1979).

=== Corrigan ===
- Tom Corrigan (1884–1952), Labor Member of the Victorian Legislative Assembly for Port Melbourne (1942–1952); His son:
- Stan Corrigan (1916–1964), Labor Member of the Victorian Legislative Assembly for Port Melbourne (1952–1955).

=== Corser ===
- Edward Corser (1852–1928), Liberal/Nationalist Member of the Australian House of Representatives for Wide Bay (1915–1928), Member of the Queensland Legislative Assembly for Maryborough (1909–1915); His son:
  - Bernard Corser (1882–1967), Country Member of the Australian House of Representatives for Wide Bay (1928–1954), Member of the Queensland Legislative Assembly for Burnett (1912–1928).

=== Court ===
- Sir Charles Court (1911–2007), Liberal Premier of Western Australia (1974–82), Member of the Western Australian Legislative Assembly for Nedlands) (1953–1982), minister in the Brand government (1959–1971); His son:
  - Richard Court (born 1947), Liberal Premier of Western Australia (1993–2001), Member of the Western Australian Legislative Assembly for Nedlands) (1982–2001), Australian Ambassador to Japan (2017–2020).

=== Courtice ===
- Ben Courtice (1881–1972), Labor Senator for Queensland (1937–1962), minister in the Chifley government (1946–1949); His nephew:
  - Brian Courtice (born 1950), Labor Member of the Australian House of Representatives for Hinkler (1987–1993).

=== Cowan (South Australia) ===
- Thomas Cowan (1839–1890), Member for the South Australian House of Assembly for Yatala (1875–1878); His brother:
- James Cowan (1848–1890), Member for the South Australian House of Assembly for Yatala (1890); His nephew:
  - John Cowan (1866–1953), Liberal Member of the South Australian Legislative Council for Southern District (1910–1944), minister in the Barwell (1920–1924) and Butler (1930–1938) governments; His son:
    - John Lancelot Cowan (1893–1971), Liberal Member of the South Australian Legislative Council for Southern District (1949–1959),

=== Cowan (Western Australia) ===
- Walkinshaw Cowan (1808–1888), Resident Magistrate and Protector of Aborigines in York (1863–1887), private secretary to Western Australian Governors John Hutt, Andrew Clarke and Frederick Irwin, (1848–1852);
- Thomas Brown (1803–1863), Member of the Western Australian Legislative Council (1850–1852), Resident Magistrate of Geraldton (1862–1863); His grand-daughter, (and daughter-in-law of Walkinshaw Cowan):
  - Edith Cowan (1861–1932), Nationalist Member of the Western Australian Legislative Assembly for West Perth (1921–1924); Her nephew:
    - Hendy Cowan (1943), National Member of the Western Australian Legislative Assembly for Merredin (1974–2001), Deputy Premier of Western Australia (1993–2001), minister in the Court Government (1993–2001);
      - David Malcolm (1938–2014), Chief Justice of Western Australia (1988–2006), Lieutenant Governor of Western Australia (1990–2009); great-great nephew of Edith Cowan
  - Sir Edward Wittenoom (1854–1936), Liberal/Nationalist Member of the Western Australian Legislative Council for Geraldton (1883–1884, 1885–1886), Central Province (1894–1898) and North Province (1902–1906, 1910–1934), President of the Western Australian Legislative Council (1922–1926); cousin of Edith Cowan.

=== Cowper ===
- Charles Cowper (1807–1875), Premier of New South Wales (1856, 1857–1859, 1861–1863, 1865–1866, 1870), Member of the New South Wales Legislative Council for County of Cumberland (1843–1850) and County of Durham (1851–1856), Member of the New South Wales Legislative Assembly for Sydney City (1856–1859), East Sydney (1859, 1860–1867) and Liverpool Plains (1869–1870), Agent-General for New South Wales (1870–1875); His son:
  - Charles Cowper Jr. (1834–1911), Member of the New South Wales Legislative Assembly for Tumut (1860–1863, 1864–1866) and Orange (1863–1864).

=== Crean ===
- Frank Crean (1916–2008), Labor Member of the Australian House of Representatives for Melbourne Ports (1951–77), Deputy Prime Minister of Australia (1972–75), minister in the Whitlam government (1972–1975), Member of the Victorian Legislative Assembly for Albert Park (1945–1947) and Prahran (1949–1951); His sons:
  - Simon Crean (1949–2023), Labor Member of the Australian House of Representatives for Hotham (1990–2013), minister in the Hawke (1990–1991), Keating (1991–1996), Rudd (2007–2010) and Gillard (2010–2013) governments, President of the Australian Council of Trade Unions (1985–1990).
  - David Crean (born 1950), Labor Member of the Tasmanian House of Assembly for Denison (1989–1992), Member of the Tasmanian Legislative Council for Buckingham (1992–1999) and Elwick (1999–2004).

=== Cremean ===
- Bert Cremean (1900–1945), Labor Member of the Victorian Legislative Assembly for Dandenong (1929–1932) and Electoral district of Clifton Hill (1934–1945), Deputy Premier of Victoria (1943); His brother:
- Jack Cremean (1907–1982), Labor Member of the Victorian Legislative Assembly for Clifton Hill (1945–1949), Member of the Australian House of Representatives for Hoddle (1945–1955).

=== Cribb ===
- Robert Cribb (1805–1893), Member of the New South Wales Legislative Assembly for East Moreton (1859–1859), Member of the Queensland Legislative Assembly for Town of Brisbane (1860–1863) and East Moreton (1863–1867); His brother:
- Benjamin Cribb (1807–1874), Member of the New South Wales Legislative Assembly for Stanley Boroughs (1858–1859), Member of the Queensland Legislative Assembly for West Moreton (1861–1867) and Ipswich (1870–1873); His sons:
  - Thomas Bridson Cribb (1845–1913), Member of the Queensland Legislative Council (1893–1896), Member of the Queensland Legislative Assembly for Ipswich (1896–1904), Treasurer of Queensland (1901–1903), Member of the Queensland Legislative Council (1913);
  - James Clarke Cribb (1856–1926), Member of the Queensland Legislative Assembly for Rosewood (1893–1896), Bundamba (1899–1912) and Bremer (1912–1915).

== D ==
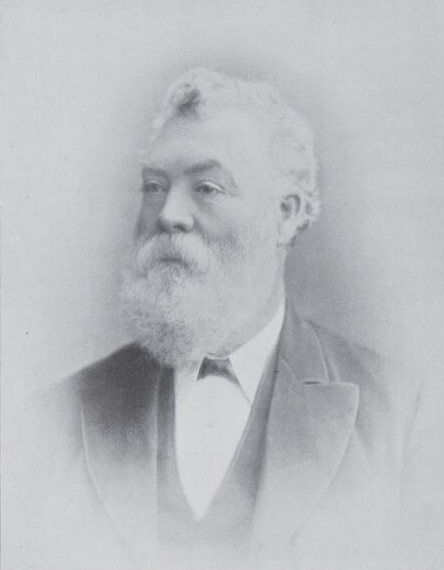
John Darling Sr. (1831–1905)

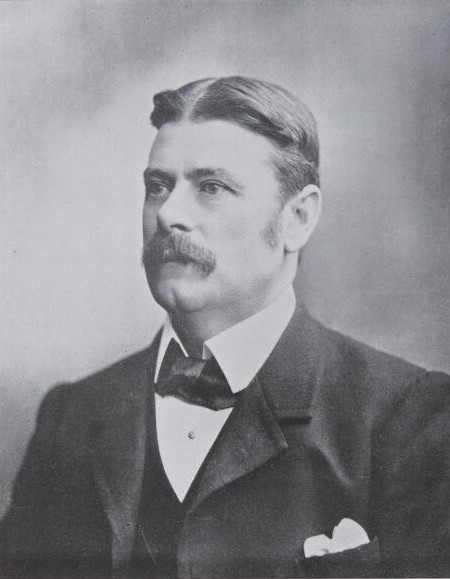
John Darling Jr. (1852–1914)

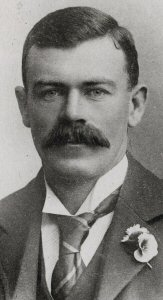
Joe Darling (1870–1946)

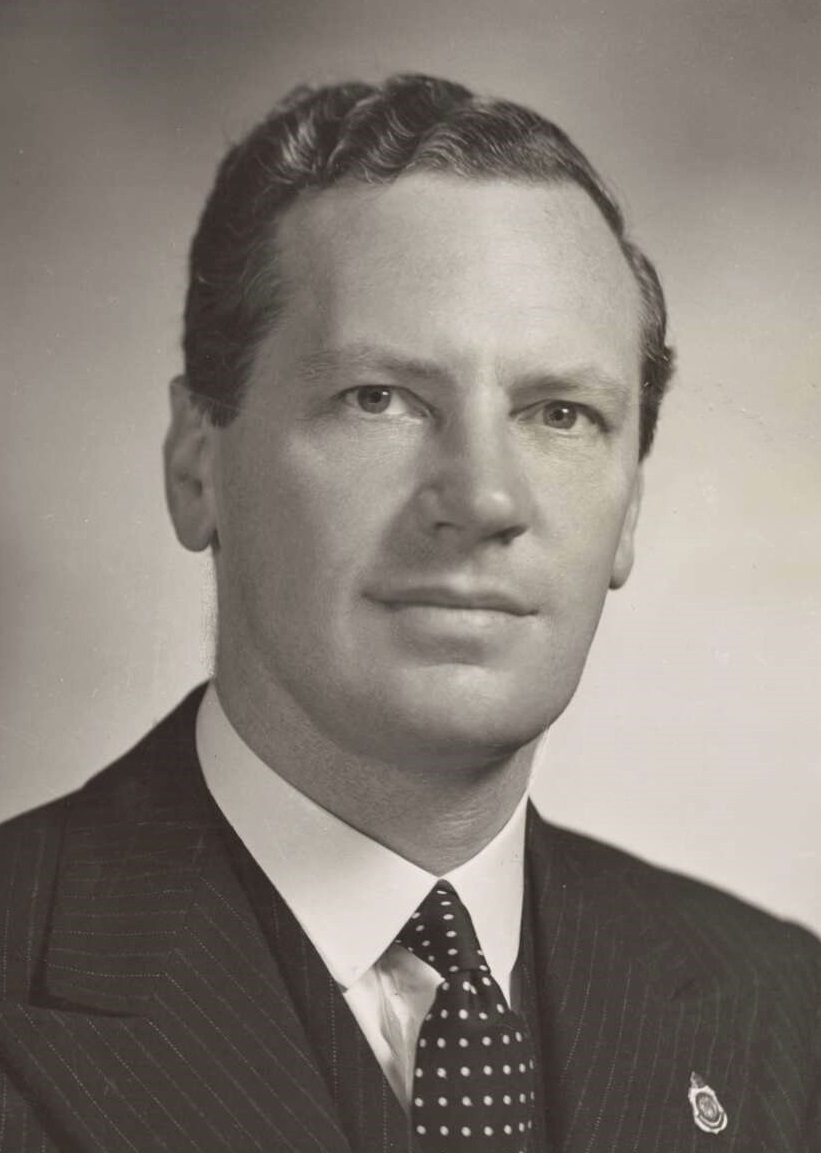
Sir Alick Downer (1910–1981)

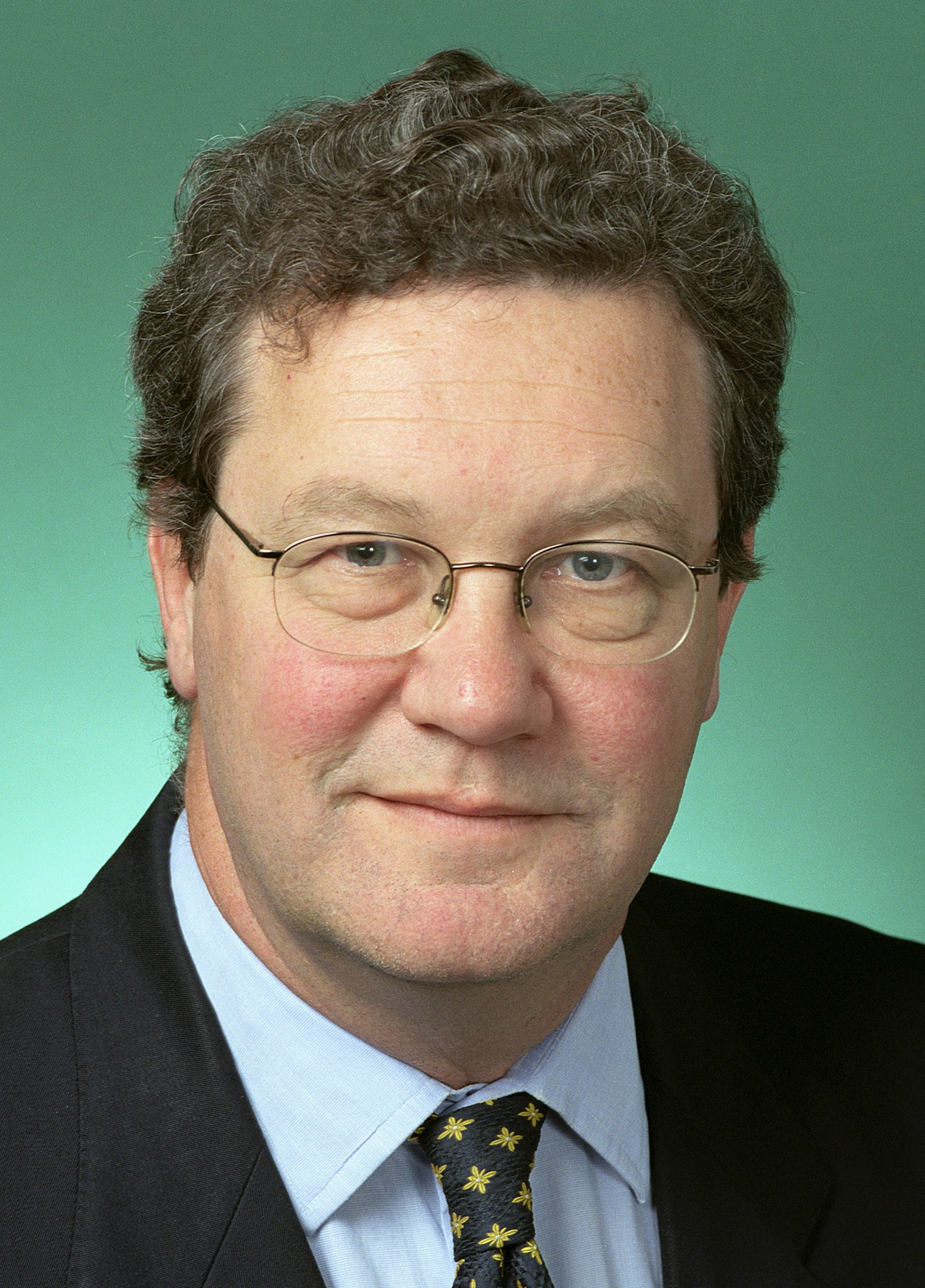
Alexander Downer (born 1951)

=== Darling ===
- John Darling Sr. (1831–1905), Member of the South Australian House of Assembly for West Adelaide (1870–1871, 1876–1878), Yatala (1878–1881) and Stanley (1885–1887), Member of the South Australian Legislative Council for Northern District (1887–1895); His sons:
  - John Darling Jr. (1852–1914), National Defence League Member of the South Australian House of Assembly for East Torrens (1896–1902) and Torrens (1902–1905);
  - Joe Darling (1870–1946), Independent Member of the Tasmanian Legislative Council for Cambridge (1921–1946).

=== Dawkins ===
- Boyd Dawkins (1917–1996), Liberal Member of the South Australian Legislative Council (1962–1982); His son:
  - John Dawkins (born 1954), Liberal/Independent President of the South Australian Legislative Council (2020–2022), Member of the South Australian Legislative Council (1997–2022); His cousin:
  - John Dawkins (born 1947), Labor Member of the Australian House of Representatives for Tangney (1974–1975) and Fremantle (1977–1994), minister in the Hawke and Keating governments (1983–1993).

=== Davies ===
- Arthur Davies (1867–1918), Member of the Western Australian Legislative Assembly for South Fremantle (1906–1911); His brothers:
- George Alfred Davies (1846–1897), Mayor of Fremantle (1894–1896); and:
- Edward William Davies (1855–1904), Mayor of Fremantle (1901).

=== Delahunty ===
- Mary Delahunty (born 1951), Labor Member of the Victorian Legislative Assembly for Northcote (1998–2006), minister in the Bracks government (1999–2006); Her brother:
- Hugh Delahunty (born 1949), Nationals Member of the Victorian Legislative Assembly for Wimmera (1999–2002) and Lowan (2002–2014), minister in the Baillieu and Napthine governments (2010–2014).

=== Dick ===
- Milton Dick (born 1972), Labor Member of the Australian House of Representatives for Oxley (2016– ), Speaker of the Australian House of Representatives (2022– ), Brisbane City Councillor for Richlands (2008–2016); His brother:
- Cameron Dick (born 1967), Labor Member of the Queensland Legislative Assembly for Greenslopes (2009–2012) and Woodridge (2015– ), minister in the Bligh (2009–2012), Palaszczuk (2015–2023) and Miles (2023–2024) governments.

=== Dobson ===
- William Lambert Dobson (1833–1898), Chief Justice of Tasmania (1885–1898), Member of the Tasmanian House of Assembly for Hobart Town (1861–1862) and Campbell Town (1864–1870), minister in the Weston (1861–1863) and Dry (1869–1870) governments; His brothers:
- Frank Dobson (1835–1895), Member of the Victorian Legislative Council for Southern Province (1865–1882) and South-Eastern Province (1882–1895), minister in the O'Loghlen government (1881–1883); And:
- Henry Dobson (1841–1918), Premier of Tasmania (1892–1894), Member of the Tasmanian House of Assembly for Brighton (1891–1900), Senator for Tasmania (1901–1910), Deputy President of the Australian Senate (1908–1910); And:
- Alfred Dobson (1849–1908), Member of the Tasmanian House of Assembly for Glenorchy (1877–1887), Speaker of the Tasmanian House of Assembly (1885–1887), Agent-General for Tasmania (1901–1908).

=== Douglas ===
- John Douglas (1828–1904), Premier of Queensland (1877–1879), Member of the New South Wales Legislative Assembly for Darling Downs (1859) and Camden (1860–1861), Member of the Queensland Legislative Assembly for Port Curtis (1863–1866), Eastern Downs (1867–1868), East Moreton (1868) and Maryborough (1875–1880), Member of the Queensland Legislative Council (1866, 1868–1869); His son:
  - Henry Douglas (1878–1952), Ministerialist/Independent Member of the Queensland Legislative Assembly for Cook (1907–1915); His grandson:
    - Alex Douglas (born 1958), National/Liberal National Member of the Queensland Legislative Assembly for Gaven (2006, 2009–2015).

Alex Douglas is also a nephew of Bob Katter and cousin of Rob Katter (see Katter family below)

=== Downer ===
- Henry Edward Downer (1836–1905), National Defence League Member of the South Australian House of Assembly for Encounter Bay (1881–1896), Attorney-General of South Australia (1890–1891); His brother:
- Sir John Downer (1843–1915), National Defence League/Protectionist/Liberal Premier of South Australia (1885–1887, 1892–1893), Member of the South Australian House of Assembly for Barossa (1878–1901), Senator for South Australia (1901–1903), Member of the South Australian Legislative Council for Southern District (1905–1915); His son:
  - Sir Alexander Russell "Alick" Downer (1910–1981), Liberal Member of the Australian House of Representatives for Angas (1949–1964), minister in the Menzies government (1958–1963), Australian High Commissioner to the United Kingdom (1964–1972); His son:
    - Alexander John Downer (born 1951), Member of the Australian House of Representatives for Mayo) (1984–2008), minister in the Howard government (1996–2007), High Commissioner of Australia to the United Kingdom (2014–2018); His daughter:
      - Georgina Downer (born 1979), Liberal candidate for the Australian House of Representatives for Mayo at the 2018 Mayo by-election and the 2019 federal election.

=== Duncan ===
- Walter Hughes Duncan (1848–1906), Member of the South Australian House of Assembly for Onkaparinga (1896–1902) and Murray (1902–1906); His brother:
- Sir John Duncan (1845–1913), National Defence/Liberal Member of the South Australian House of Assembly for Electoral district of Port Adelaide (1871–1875), Wallaroo (1875–1877) and Wooroora (1884–1890), Member of the South Australian Legislative Council (1891–1896, 1900–1913); His sons:
  - Jack Duncan-Hughes (1882–1962), Nationalist/UAP Senator for South Australia (1931–1938), Member of the Australian House of Representatives for Boothby (1922–1928) and Wakefield (1940–1943); and:
  - Sir Walter Duncan (1885–1963), Liberal President of the South Australian Legislative Council (1944–1962), Member of the South Australian Legislative Council (1918–1962).

=== Dunn ===
- John Dunn Snr. (1802–1894), Member of the South Australian House of Assembly for Mount Barker (1857–1868), Member of the South Australian Legislative Council (1869–1877); His sons:
  - William Henry Dunn (1841–1891), Member of the South Australian House of Assembly for Onkaparinga (1875–1878); and
  - John Dunn Jnr. (1830–1892), Member of the South Australian House of Assembly for Barossa (1875–1878), Member of the South Australian Legislative Council (1880–1888); Their brother-in-law, and John Dunn Snr's nephew:
    - William Paltridge (1835–1928), Member of the South Australian House of Assembly for Victoria (1870–1871).

=== Dutton ===
- Francis Dutton 1818-1877), Premier of South Australia (1863, 1865), Member of the South Australian House of Assembly for Light (1860-1862, 1862-1865) and City of Adelaide (1857-1860), Member of the South Australian Legislative Council for East Adelaide (1851-1857), Minister in the Hanson government (1857-1859), Agent-General for South Australia (1865-1877); His brother:
- Frederick Dutton (1812-1890), Member of the South Australian Legislative Council (1852-1853).

== E ==
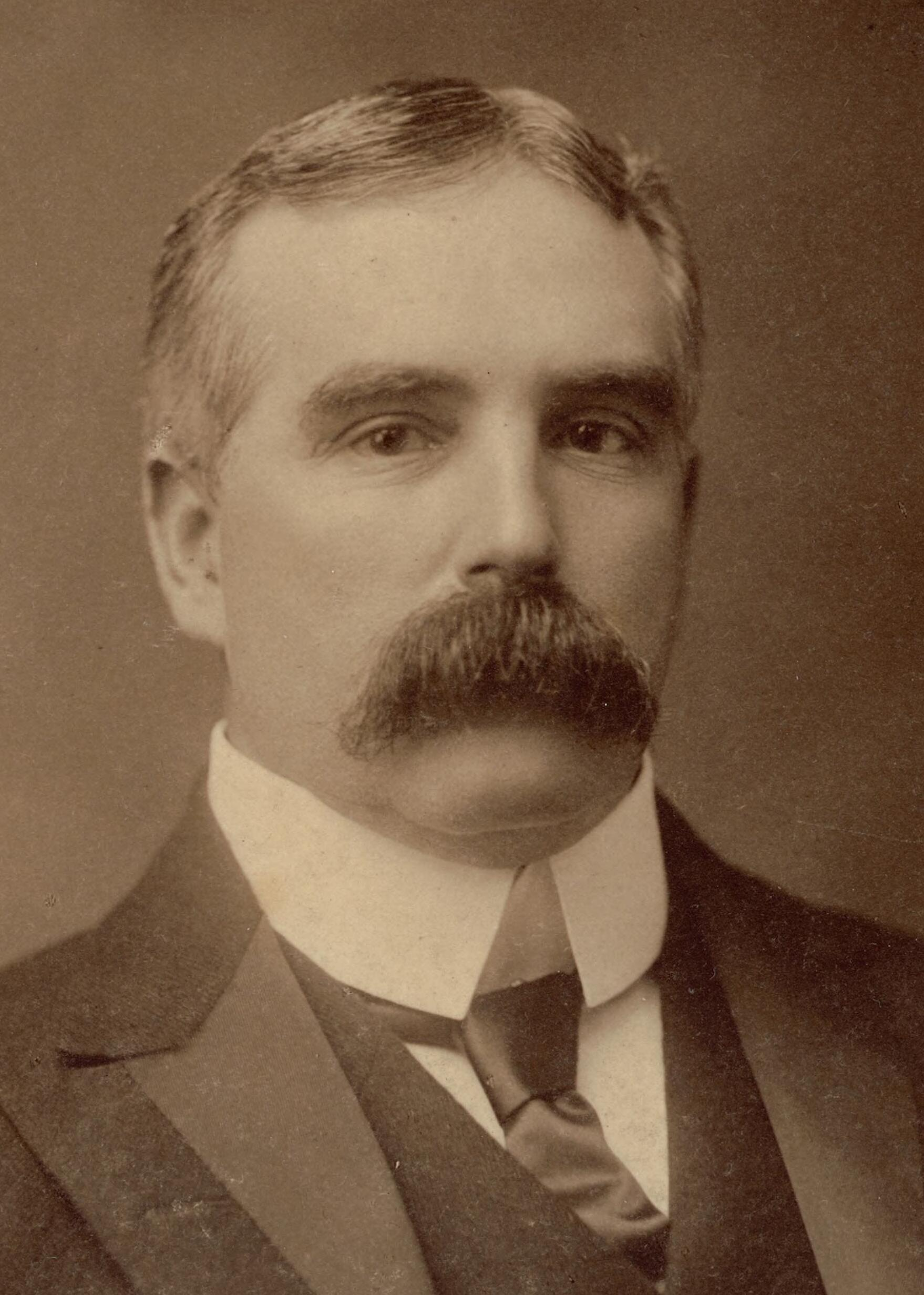
Sir Thomas Ewing
(1856-1920)

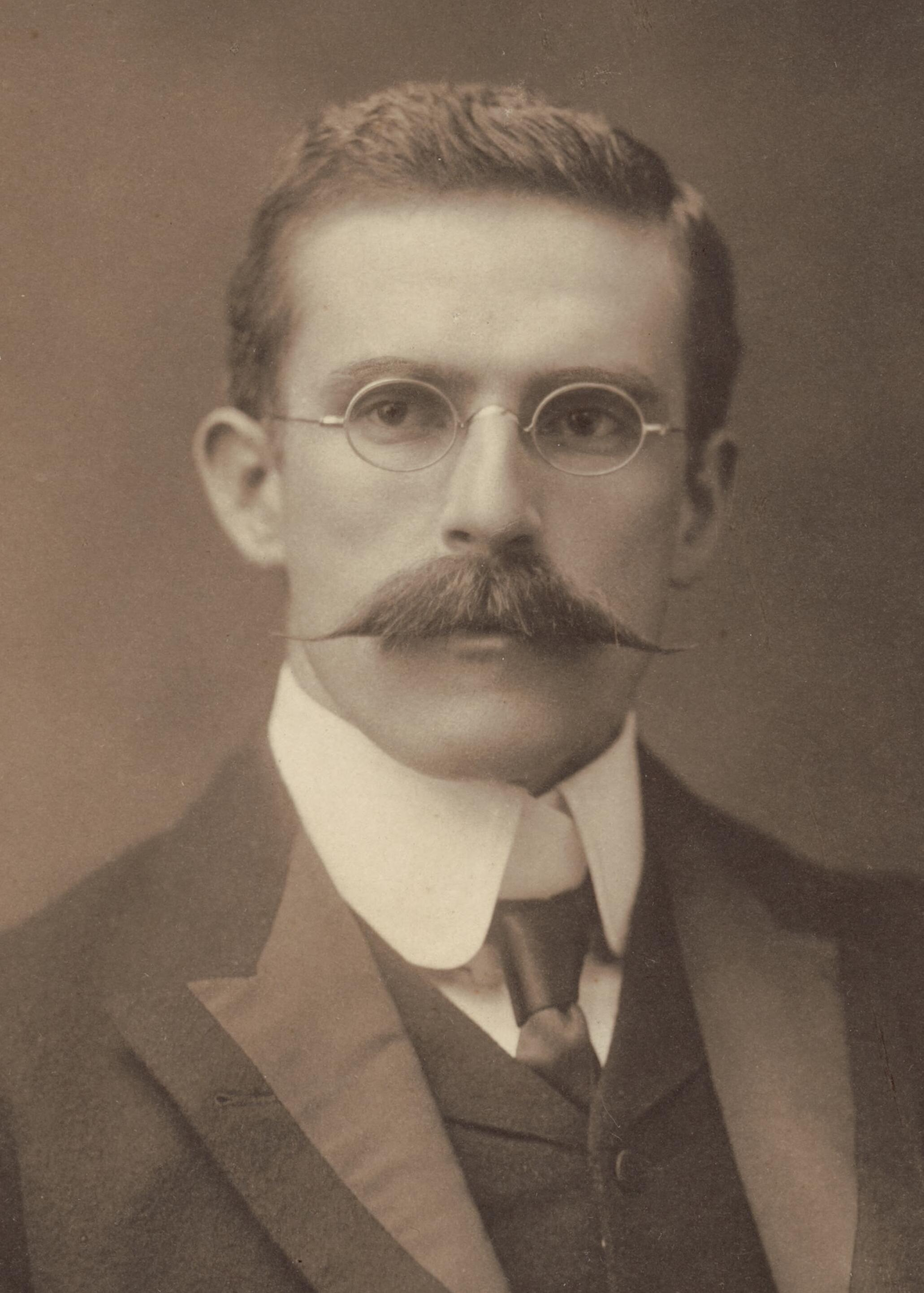
Norman Ewing
(1870-1928)

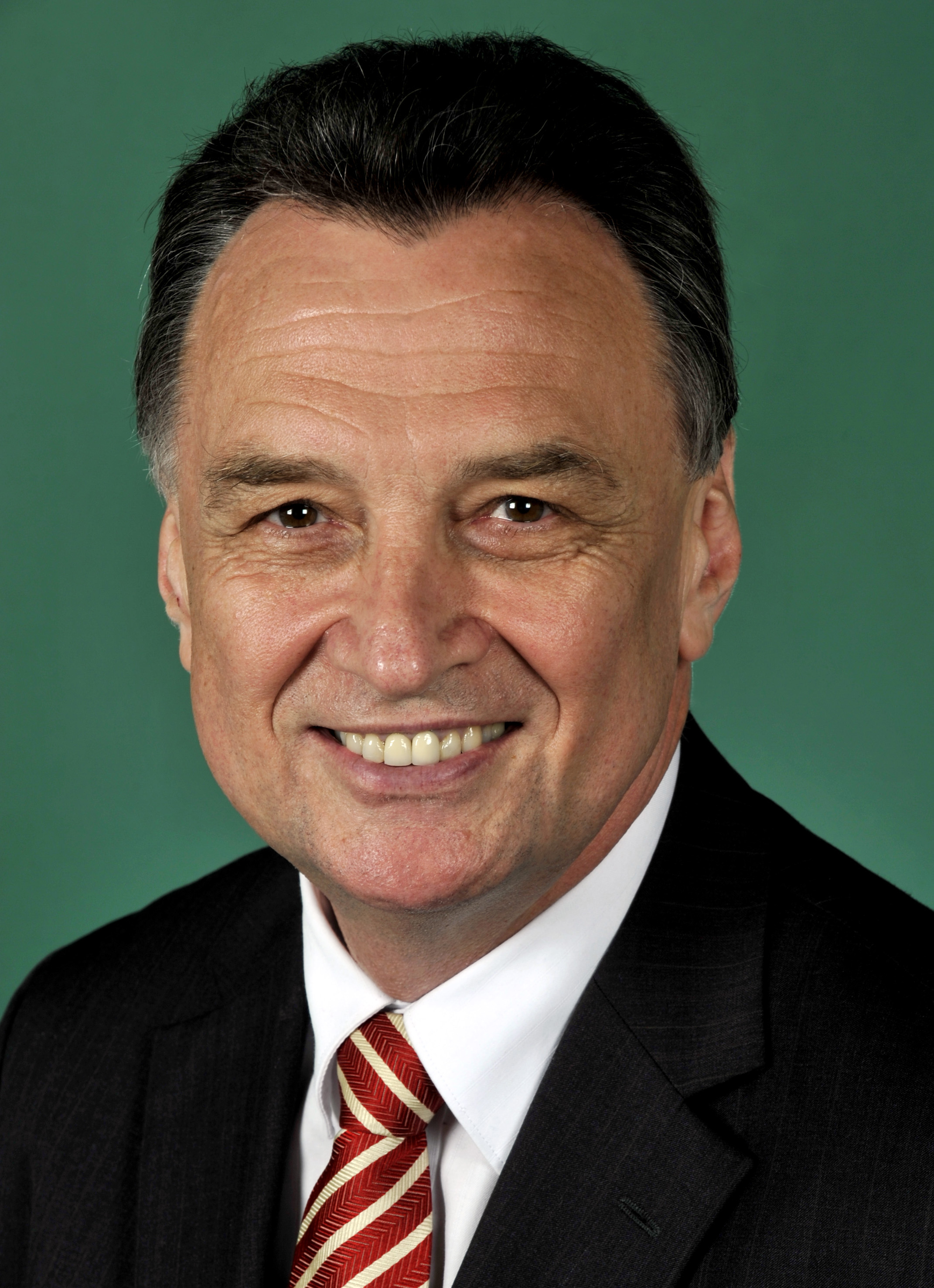
Craig Emerson
(born 1954)

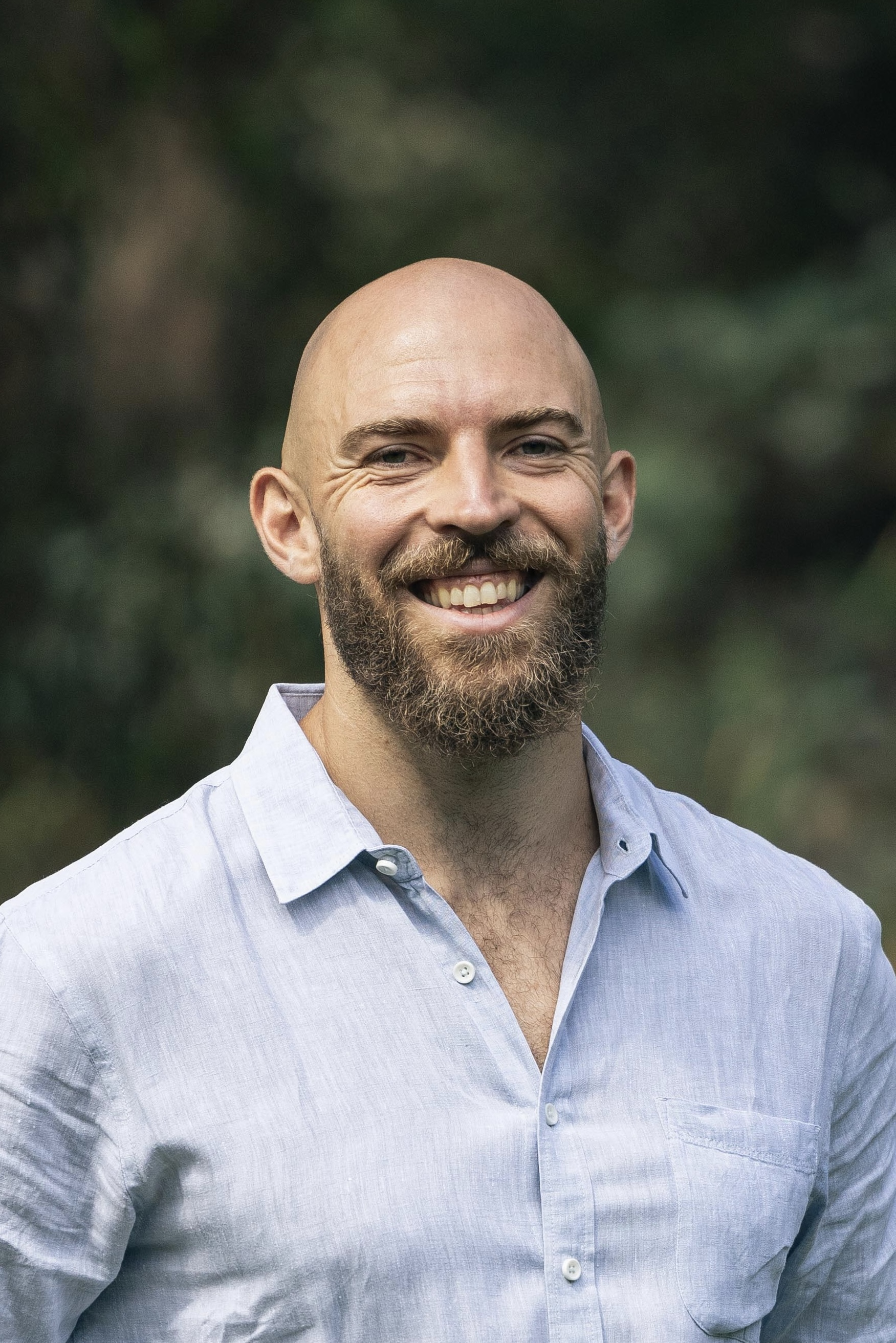
Thomas Emerson
(born 1993)

=== Emerson ===
- Craig Emerson (born 1954), Labor Member of the Australian House of Representatives for Rankin (1998–2013), minister in the Rudd and Gillard governments (2007–2013); His son:
  - Thomas Emerson (born 1993), IFC/Independent Member of the Australian Capital Territory Legislative Assembly for Kurrajong (2024-).

=== Evans ===
- Stan Evans, OAM (1930–2025) (MP for three electorates: Onkaparinga, Fisher and Davenport) 1968–1993. Father of:
- Iain Evans (born 1959) (MP for Davenport) 1993–2014. Liberal Opposition Leader 2006–2007. Deputy Liberal Opposition Leader 2005–2006. Liberal government minister 1997–2002. Son.

=== Ewing ===
- Sir Thomas Ewing (1856–1920), Protectionist/Liberal Member of the Australian House of Representatives for Richmond (1901–1910), Member of the New South Wales Legislative Assembly for Richmond (1885–1894) and Lismore (1894–1901), minister in the Deakin government (1906–1908); His brothers:
- John Ewing (1863–1933), Nationalist Member of the Western Australian Legislative Assembly for South-West Mining (1901–1904) and Collie (1905–1908), Member of the Western Australian Legislative Council for South-West Province (1916–1933), minister in the Mitchell government (1923–1924); And:
- Norman Ewing (1870–1928), Free Trade Senator for Western Australia (1901–1903), Member of the Western Australian Legislative Assembly for Swan (1897–1901), Member of the Tasmanian House of Assembly for Franklin (1909–1915).

== F ==
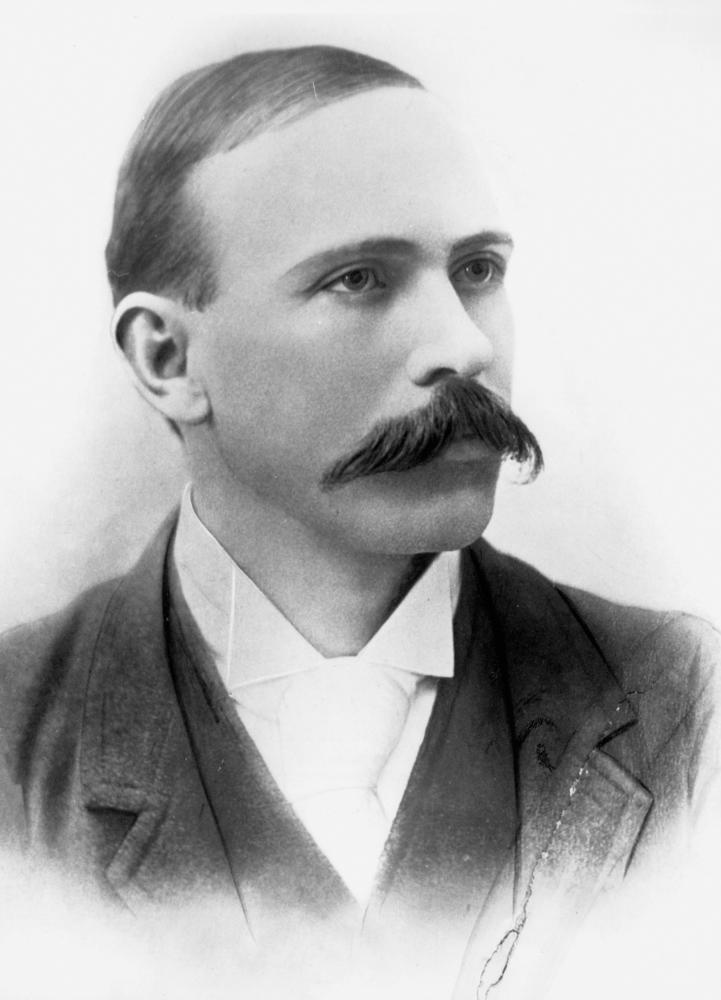
Charles Fitzgerald (1865–1913)

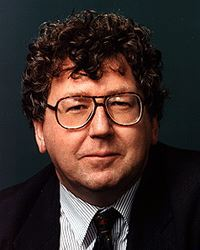
Laurie Ferguson (born 1952)

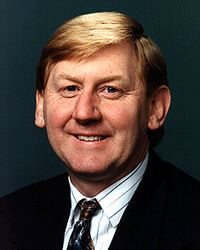
Martin Ferguson (born 1953)

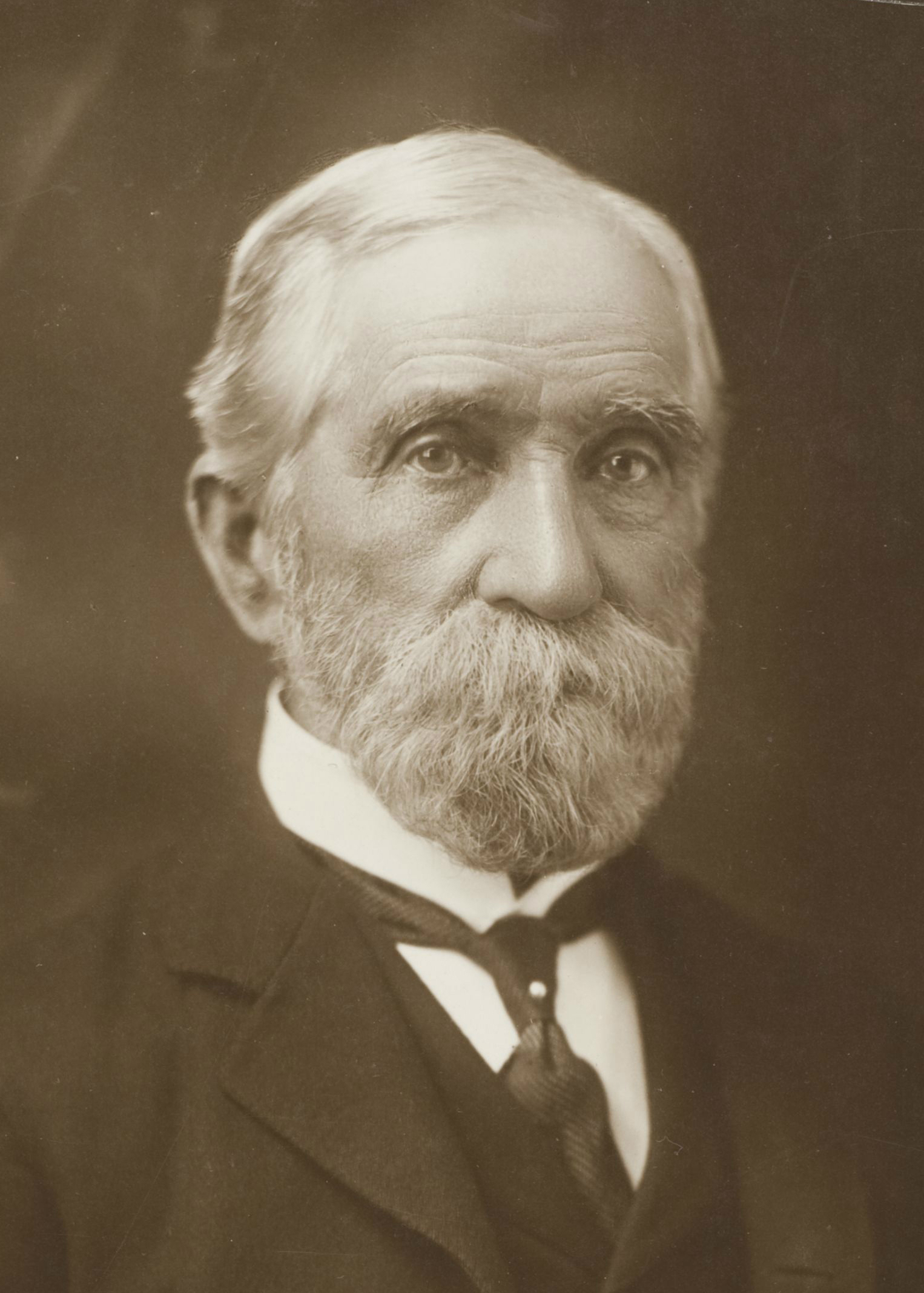
Sir Simon Fraser (1832–1919)

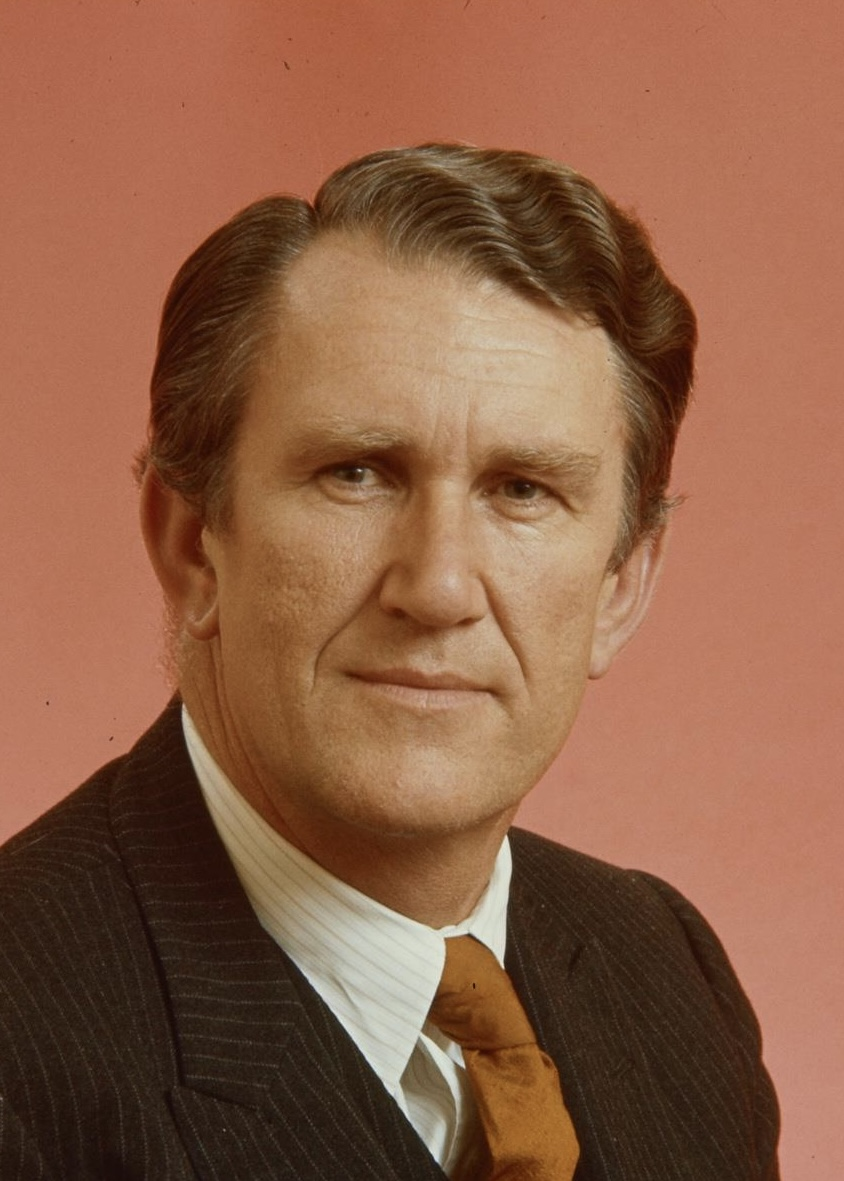
Malcolm Fraser (1930–2015)

=== Fairbairn ===
- Sir George Fairbairn (1855–1943), Liberal/Nationalist Senator for Victoria (1917–1923), Member of the Australian House of Representatives for Fawkner (1906–1913); His grandson:
  - Sir David Fairbairn (1917–1994), Liberal Member of the Australian House of Representatives for Farrer (1949–1975), minister in the Menzies, Holt, McEwen and Gorton governments (1962–1972).

=== Farrell (Tasmania) ===
- Craig Farrell (born 1964), Member of the Tasmanian Legislative Council for Derwent. Father of:
- Casey Farrell, Member of the Tasmanian House of Assembly for Lyons, his son

=== Farrell (Queensland) ===
- David Farrell (1891–1953), Member of the Queensland Legislative Assembly for Maryborough
- George Farrell (1895–1966), Member of the Queensland Legislative Assembly for Rockhampton, his brother

=== Ferguson ===
- Jack Ferguson (1924–2002) (MP for Merrylands) 1959–62, 1968–84 and Fairfield 1962–68. Deputy Premier of New South Wales 1976–84. Sons;
- Laurie Ferguson (born 1952) (MHR for Reid) 1990–2010.
- Martin Ferguson (born 1953) (MHR for Batman) 1996–2013. Minister in the Rudd government

=== Fitzgerald ===
- Thomas Henry Fitzgerald (1824–1888), member of the Queensland Legislative Assembly for Rockhampton (1867), Kennedy (1867–1869) and Bowen (1873–1875), minister in the Mackenzie government (1868–1869); His son:
  - Charles Fitzgerald (1865–1913), Labor Member of the Queensland Legislative Assembly for Mitchell (1896–1902).

=== Fitzgibbon ===
- Eric Fitzgibbon (1936–2015), Labor Member of the Australian House of Representatives for Hunter (1984–1996), Mayor of Cessnock (1981–1983); His son:
  - Joel Fitzgibbon (born 1962), Labor Member of the Australian House of Representatives for Hunter (1996–2022), minister in the Rudd and Gillard governments (2007–2013).

=== Fisken/Ronaldson ===
- Archibald Fisken (1897–1970) (MHR for Ballarat) 1934–1937, grandfather of
- Michael Ronaldson (1954– ) (MHR for Ballarat) 1990–2001. Minister in the Abbott Ministry.

=== Fong Lim ===
- Alec Fong Lim (1931–1990) (Lord Mayor of Darwin) 1984–90. His daughter;
- Katrina Fong Lim (1961–) (Lord Mayor of Darwin) 2012–.

=== Foote ===
- John Clarke Foote (1822–1895), Member of the Queensland Legislative Council (1877–1895); His brother:
- James Foote (1829–1895), Member of the Queensland Legislative Assembly for West Moreton (1873–1878), Bundamba (1880–1888) and Rosewood (1892–1893), Mayor of Ipswich (1870).

=== Fraser (ACT) ===
- Allan Fraser (1902–1977), Labor/Independent Member of the Australian House of Representatives for Eden-Monaro (1943–1966, 1969–1972), Member of the Australian Capital Territory House of Assembly for Fraser (1975–1977); His brother:
- Jim Fraser (1908–1970), Labor Member of the Australian House of Representatives for Australian Capital Territory (1951–1970)

=== Fraser (Victoria) ===
- Sir Simon Fraser (1832–1919) (Senator for VIC) 1901–06. Grandson;
- Malcolm Fraser (1930–2015) (MHR for Wannon) 1955–83. Minister in the Holt, McEwen, Gorton and McMahon Ministries. 22nd Prime Minister of Australia 1975–83.

== G ==
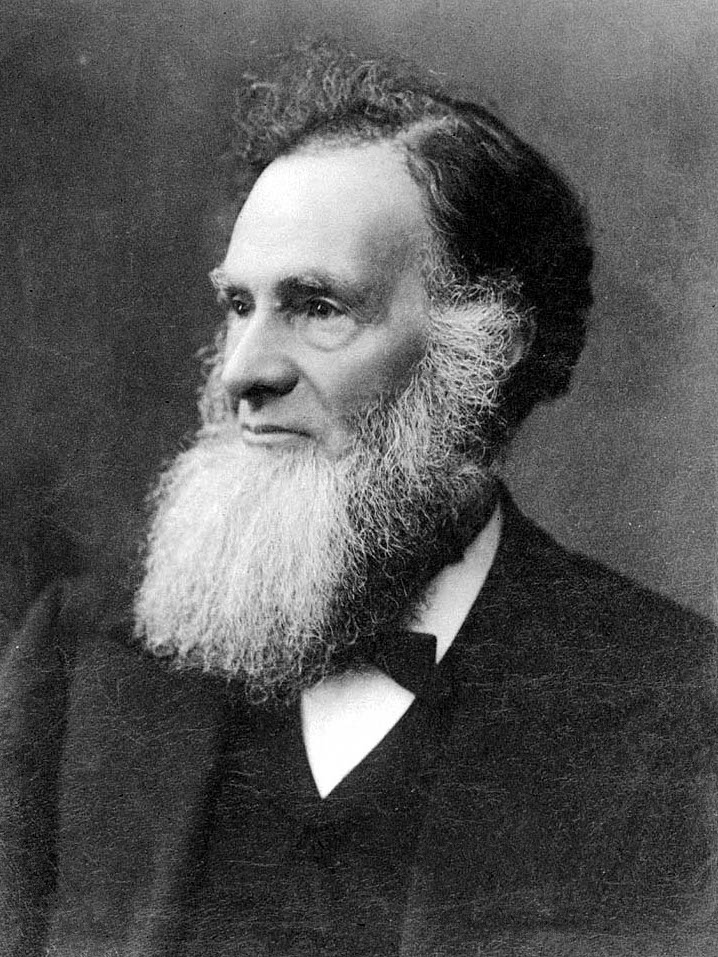
Andrew Garran (1825–1901)

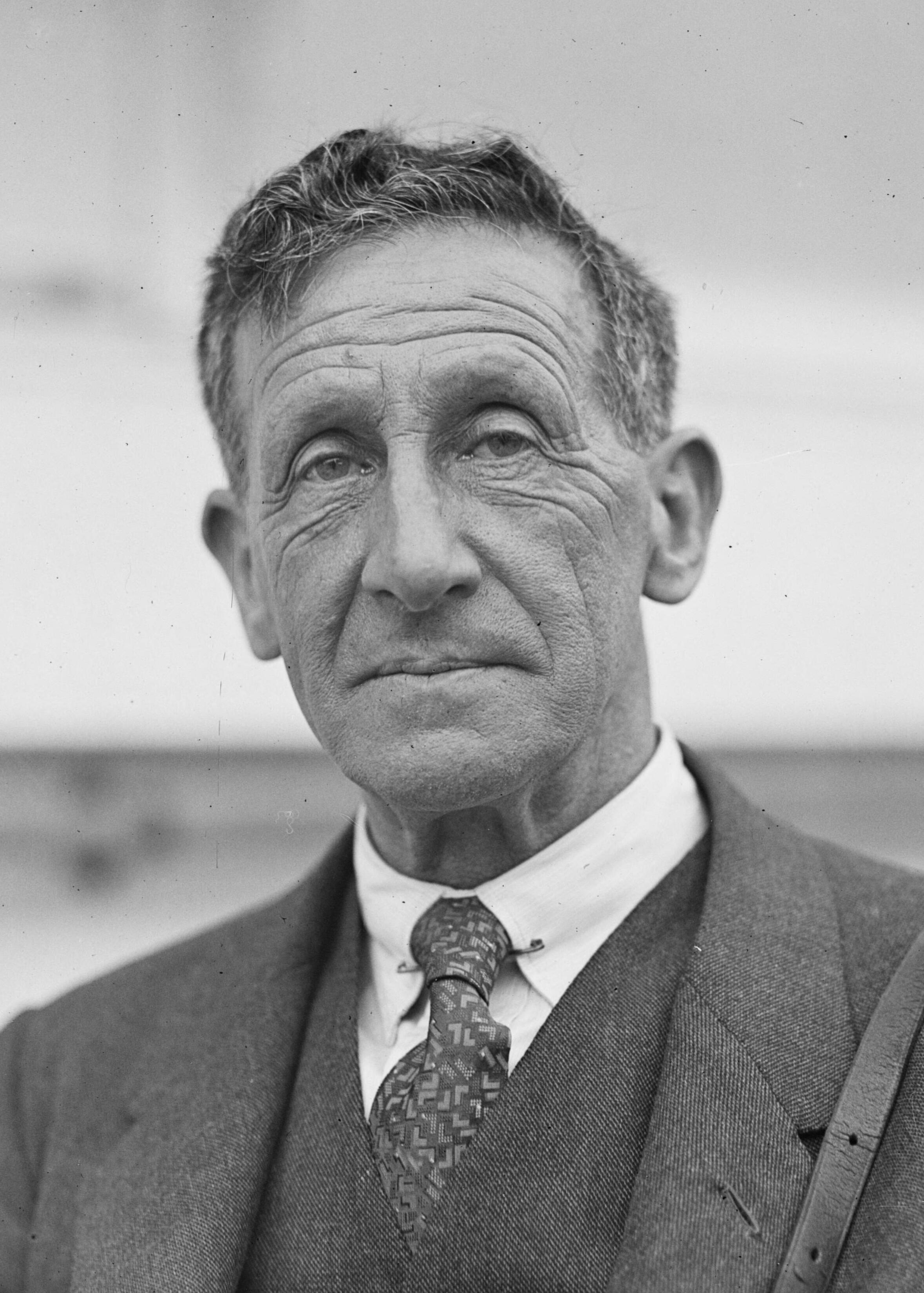
Robert Garran (1867–1957)

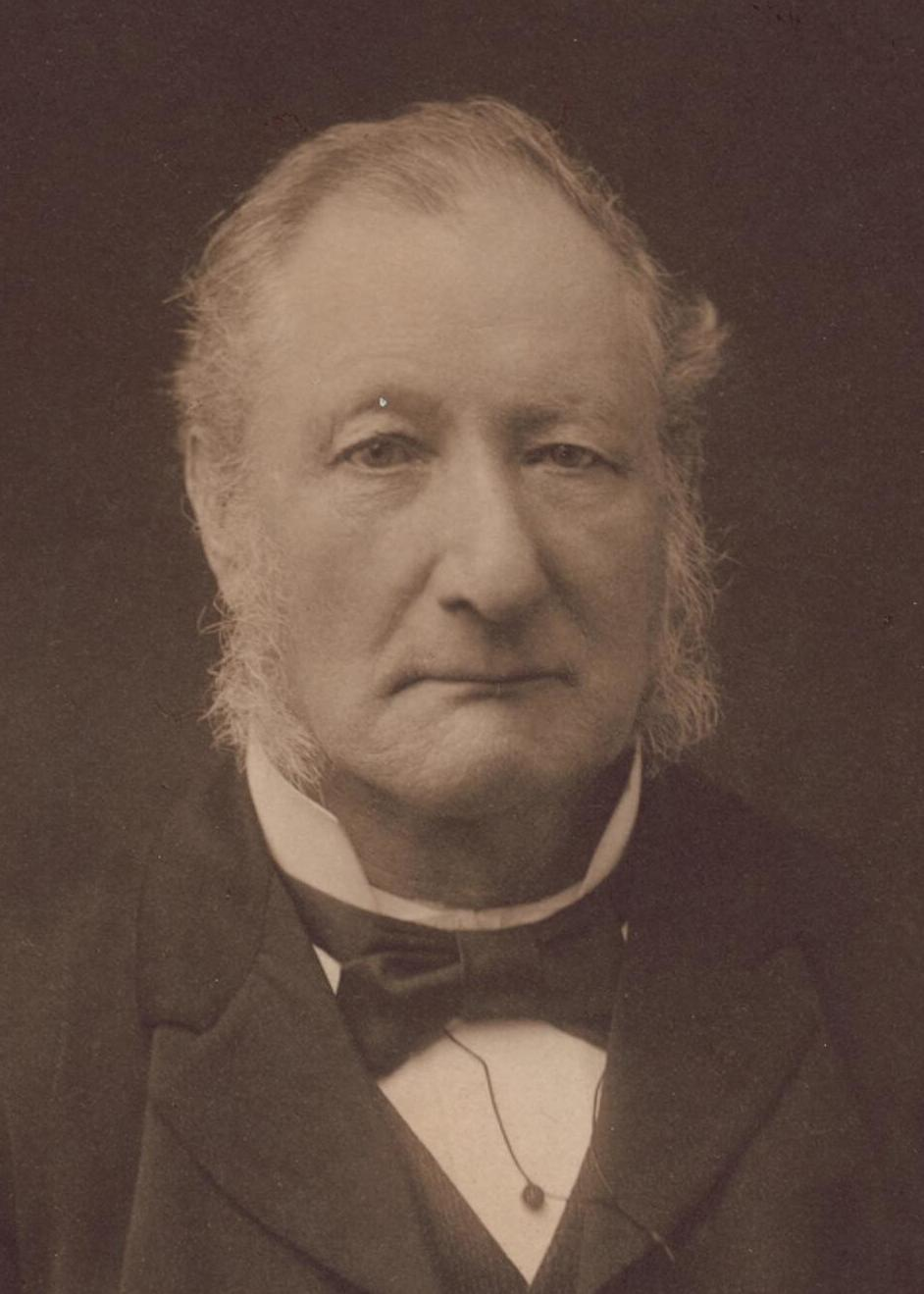
William Henry Groom (1833–1901)

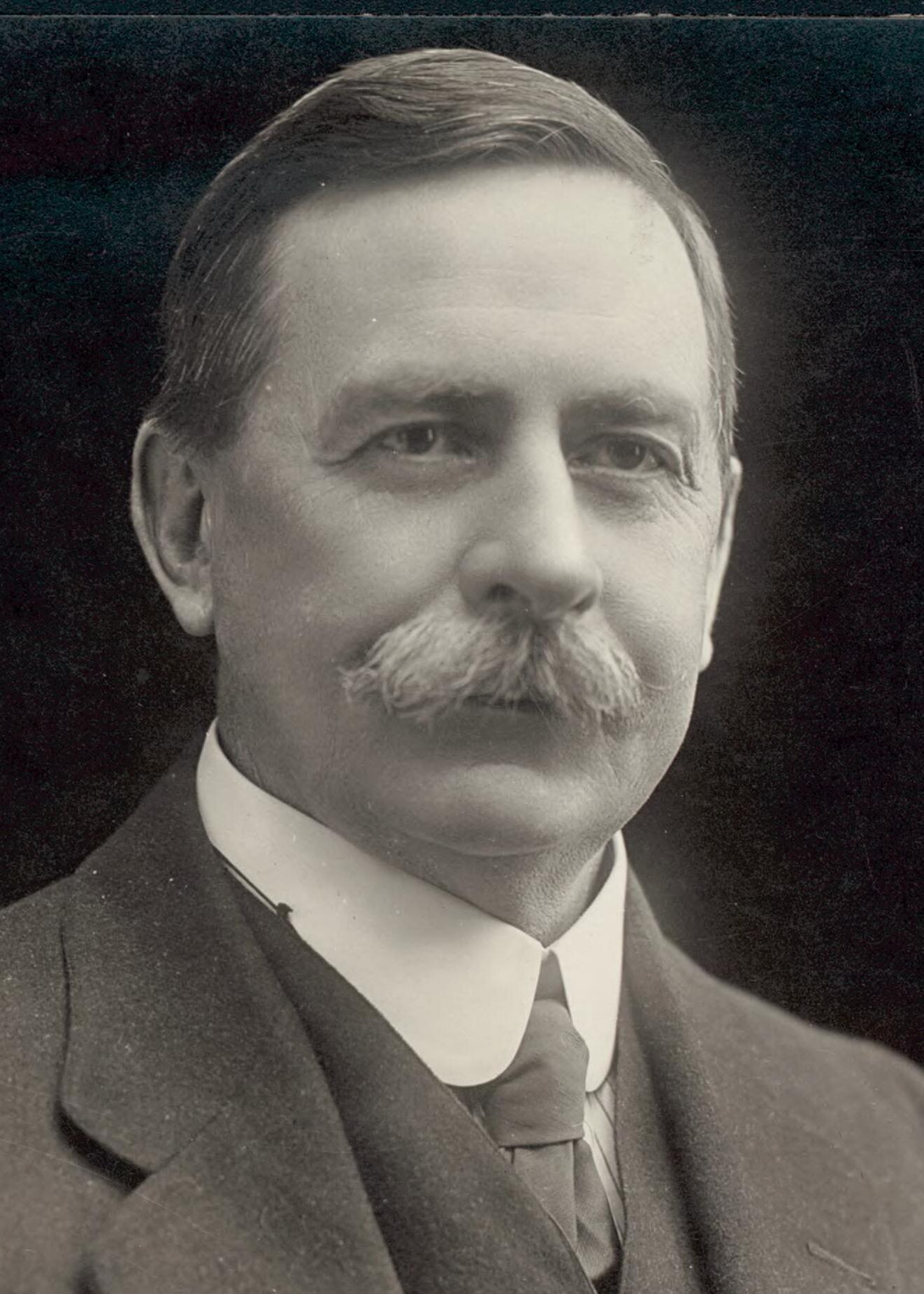
Sir Littleton Groom (1867–1936)

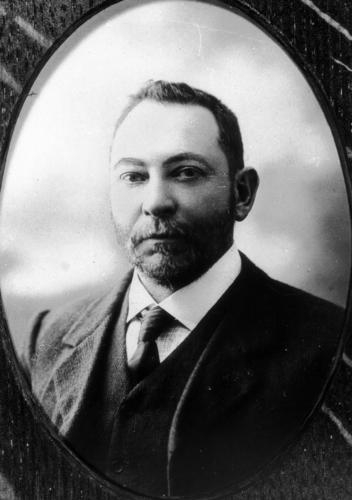
Henry Groom (1860–1926)

=== Garran ===
- Andrew Garran (1825–1901), Member of the New South Wales Legislative Council (1887–1892, 1895–1898); His son:
  - Sir Robert Garran (1867–1957), Solicitor-General of Australia (1916–1932).

=== Gibson ===
- William Gibson (1869–1955), Country Senator for Victoria (1935–1947), Member of the Australian House of Representatives for Corangamite (1918–1929, 1931–1934), minister in the Bruce government (1923–1929); His brother:
- David Gibson (1873–1940), Farmers' Union/Country Member of the Victorian Legislative Assembly for Grenville (1917–1921).

=== Gilmore ===
- Tom Gilmore Sr. (1908–1994), Country Member of the Australian House of Representatives for Leichhardt (1949–1951), Member of the Queensland Legislative Assembly for Tablelands (1957–1963); His son:
  - Tom Gilmore Jr. (1946–2024), Nationals Member of the Queensland Legislative Assembly for Tablelands (1986–1998).

=== Goldsworthy ===
- Roger Goldsworthy MHA, AO (1929–2025) first Member for Kavel 1970–1992, 3rd Deputy Premier of South Australia 1979–1982, various ministries, father of
- Mark Goldsworthy (1956 –) third Member for Kavel 2002–2018
- Grant Chapman (1949–) (Roger Goldsworthy's brother-in-law) MHR for Kingston, Senator for South Australia

=== Grimwade ===
- Frederick Sheppard Grimwade (1840-1910), Member of the Victorian Legislative Council for North Yarra (1891-1904); His grandson:
  - Philip Grimwade (1912–1961), Liberal Member of the Victorian Legislative Assembly for Goulburn (1947–1950); His nephew:
    - Fred Grimwade (1933–1989), Member of the Victorian Legislative Council for Bendigo (1967–1979) and Central Highlands (1979–1987), President of the Victorian Legislative Council (1979–1985).

=== Groom (Queensland) ===
- William Henry Groom (1833–1901), Member of the Queensland Legislative Assembly (1862–1901), Speaker of the Queensland Legislative Assembly (1883–1888), Member of the MHR for the Division of Darling Downs March–August 1901.
- his sons:
  - Sir Littleton Ernest Groom, KCMG (1867–1936), MHR for the Division of Darling Downs 190–1929, 1931–1936, Minister in the Deakin, Cook, Hughes and Bruce Ministries. Speaker of the House of Representatives 1926–1929
  - Henry Littleton Groom (1860–1926), Member of the Queensland Legislative Council (1906–1922)

=== Groom (Tasmania) ===
- Ray Groom was a Member of the House of Representatives 1975–1984, a Minister in the Fraser government, a member of the Tasmanian House of Assembly 1986–2001, then Premier of Tasmania 1992–1996; his son,
  - Matthew Groom was a Member of the Tasmanian House of Assembly 2010–2018 and a minister in the Tasmanian Government 2014–2018.

=== Gullett ===
- Henry Gullett (1837–1914) was a member of the New South Wales Legislative Council from 1908 till 1914.
- Sir Henry Gullett (1878–1940) was the nephew of the New South Wales politician of the same name. He won the Victorian seat of Henty of the House of Representatives and held it from 1925 till his death in 1940 in a plane crash, at which time he was a government minister.
- Jo Gullett (1914–1999) won his father's old seat of Henty in the House of Representatives and held it from 1946 to 1955. During some of that time he also served as government whip.

=== Guy ===
- James Guy was an ALP Senator for Tasmania from 1914 to 1920 and his son
  - James Allan Guy was ALP and later Nationalist Member for Bass and a Senator for Tasmania.
  - George McElwee, Member of the Tasmanian Legislative Council from 1940 to 1946, was James Guy's brother-in-law.

== H ==
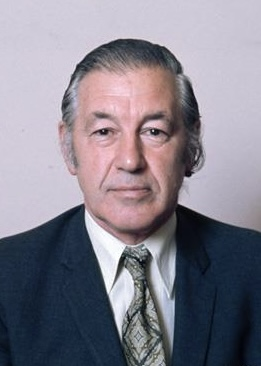
Rupert Hamer (1916–2004)

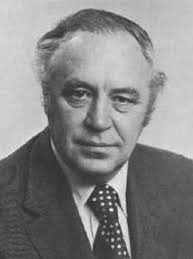
David Hamer (1923–2002)

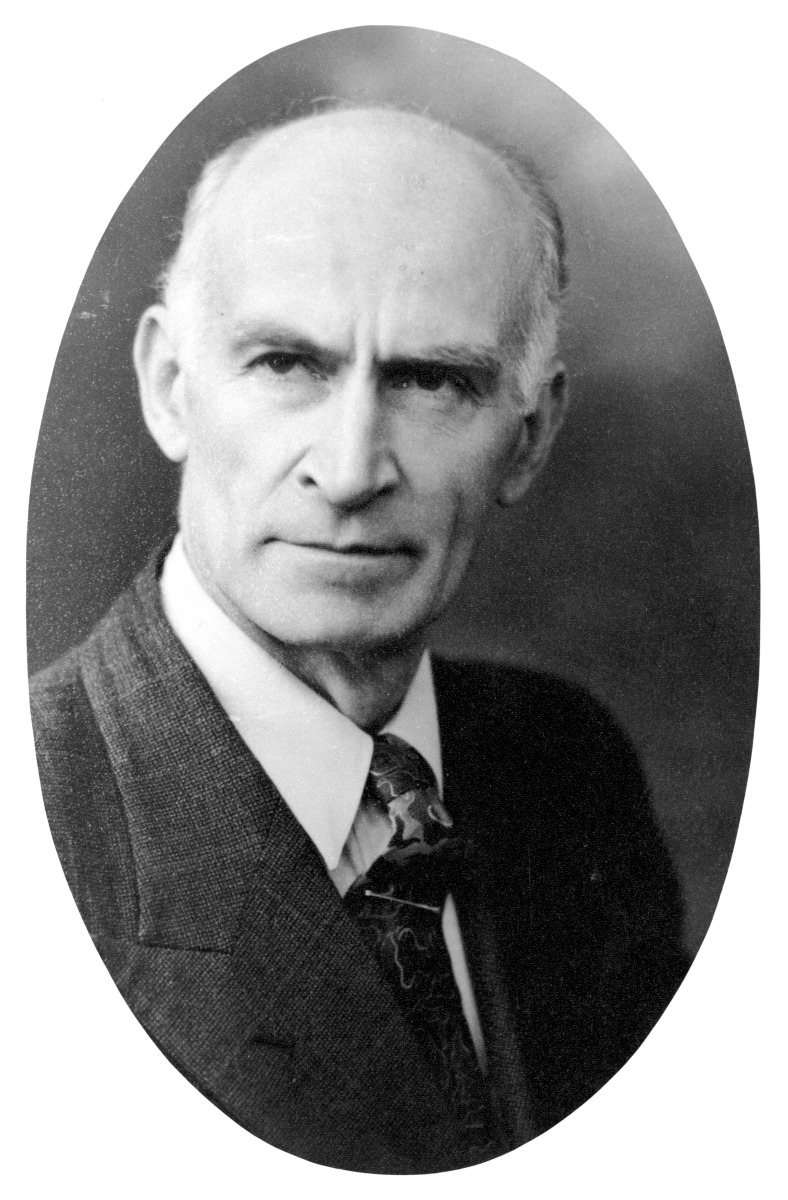
Albert Hawke (1900–1986)

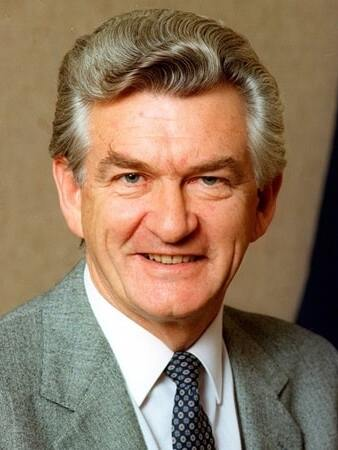
Bob Hawke (1929–2019)

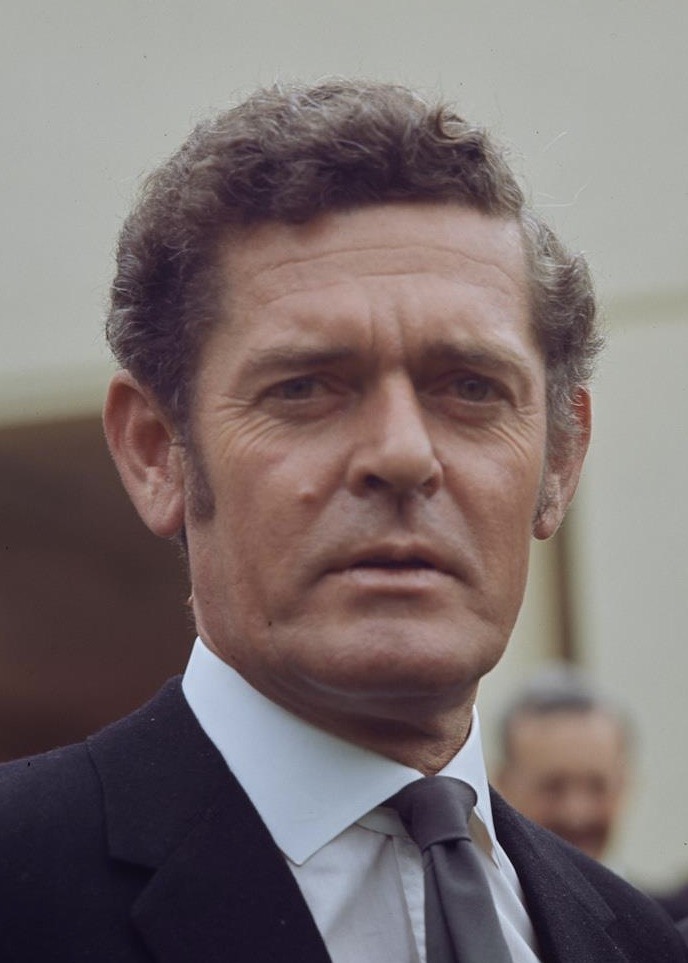
Tom Hughes (1923–2024)

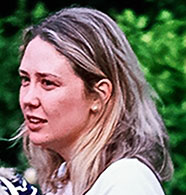
Amelia Hamer

=== Hamer ===
- Sir Rupert "Dick" Hamer (1916–2004), 39th Premier of Victoria 1972–1981. His younger brother;
- David Hamer (1923–2002) (MHR for Isaacs) 1969–1974. Australian Senator for Victoria 1978–1990. His grandfather-in-law;
- Sir William Murray McPherson (1865–1932) 31st Premier of Victoria, Treasurer of Victoria. Member for Hawthorn (1913–30). His father;
- Thomas McPherson, Mayor of Melbourne (1870–71)
- The uncle of Sir Rupert and David;
- George Swinburne (1861–1928), Member for Hawthorn in the Victorian Legislative Assembly (1902–1913). Founder of Swinburne University.
- Amelia Hamer (b. 1993), Candidate in the 2025 Australian federal election and candidate for Malvern in the 2026 Victorian state election.

=== Hanlon ===
- Ned Hanlon (1887–1952), Labor Premier of Queensland (1946–1952), Member of the Queensland Legislative Assembly for Ithaca (1926–1952), minister in the Forgan Smith and Cooper governments (1932–1946); His son:
  - Pat Hanlon (1930–2014), Labor Member of the Queensland Legislative Assembly for Ithaca (1956–1960) and Baroona (1960–1974).

=== Hannaford ===
- Walter Hannaford (1868–1942), Member of the South Australian Legislative Council (1912–1941); His son:
  - Clive Hannaford (1903–1967), Liberal/Independent Senator for South Australia (1950–1967).

=== Hargrave ===
- Richard Hargrave (1817–1905), Member of the New South Wales Legislative Assembly for New England and Macleay (1856–1857); His brother:
- John Hargrave (1815–1885), Member of the New South Wales Legislative Assembly for Electoral district of Illawarra (1859) and East Camden (1859), Member of the New South Wales Legislative Council (1859–1865).

=== Harrison/Walters ===
- Eric Harrison was a Member of the House of Representatives seat of Wentworth from 1931 to 1956, the first Deputy Leader of the Liberal Party of Australia (1944 to 1956) and held several major portfolios. His daughter
  - Shirley Walters was Liberal Party Senator for Tasmania from 1975 to 1993.

=== Hawke ===
- Albert Hawke (1900–86) MHA for Burra Burra, South Australia 1924–27, MLA for Northam, Western Australia 1933–68. Premier of Western Australia 1953–59. Brother;
- Arthur Clarence "Clem" Hawke (1898–1989) General Secretary; Australian Labor Party, South Australia 1919–1920. Minister of the Congregational Church 1920–1979. Son;
- Bob Hawke (1929–2019) MHR for Wills 1980–92. 23rd Prime Minister of Australia 1983–91.

=== Henderson ===
- Ann Henderson (1941–2002), Liberal Member of the Victorian Legislative Assembly for Geelong (1992–1999), minister in the Kennett Government (1996–1999); Her daughter:
  - Sarah Henderson (born 1964), Liberal Member of the Australian House of Representatives for Corangamite (2013–2019), Senator for Victoria (2019– ).

=== Henty ===
- Edward Henty (1810–1878), Member of the Victorian Legislative Assembly for Normanby (1855–1861); His Brothers:
- William Henty (1808–1881), Member of the Tasmanian Legislative Council for Electoral division of Tamar (1856–1862), minister in the Weston government (1856–1862); And:
- Charles Henty (1807–1864), Member of the Tasmanian House of Assembly for George Town (1856–1862); And:
- James Henty (1800–1882), Member of the Victorian Legislative Council for Portland (1852–1856) and South Western Province (1856–1882); His sons:
  - Henry Henty (1833–1912), Member of the Victorian Legislative Assembly for Grenville (1866–1867); And:
  - Thomas Henty (1836–1887), Member of the Victorian Legislative Council for Southern Province (1884–1887); His grandsons:
    - Denham Henty (1903–1978), Liberal Senator for Tasmania (1950–1968), minister in the Menzies, Holt, McEwen and Gorton governments (1956–1968).
    - James Wilson Henty (1909–1995), Liberal Member of the Tasmanian House of Assembly for Bass (1968–1972).
- Stephen Henty (1811–1872), Member of the Victorian Legislative Council for Western Province (1856–1870); His son:
  - Ernest Henty (1862–1895), Member of the Western Australian Legislative Council for Central Province (1894–1895);

=== Heydon ===
- Charles Heydon (1845–1932), Member of the New South Wales Legislative Council (1893–1898), minister in the Dibbs government (1893–1894); His brother:
- Louis Heydon (1848–1918), Member of the New South Wales Legislative Assembly for Yass Plains (1882–1886), Member of the New South Wales Legislative Council (1889–1918), minister in the Robertson government (1885–1886).

=== Higham ===
- Edward Higham (1846–1885), Member of the Western Australian Legislative Council (1880–1884), Mayor of Cockburn (1871–1876), Mayor of Fremantle (1878–1880, 1882); His brother:
- John Higham (1856–1927), Member of the Western Australian Legislative Assembly for Fremantle (1896–1904).

=== Hiscutt ===
- Hugh Hiscutt, Member for West Devon 1983–1995 in the Legislative Council of Tasmania.
- Des Hiscutt, Member for West Devon 1995–1997 and Member for Emu Bay 1997–1999 in the Legislative Council of Tasmania. His Brother.
- Leonie Hiscutt, Member for Montgomery 2013–2025 in the Legislative Council of Tasmania. His niece by marriage.
- Casey Hiscutt, Member for Montgomery 2025– in the Legislative Council of Tasmania. His grand-nephew through Leonie Hiscutt.

=== Hodgman ===
- William Clark "Bill" Hodgman (1909–1997), Liberal/Independent Member of the Tasmanian House of Assembly for Denison (1955–1964), Member of the Tasmanian Legislative Council for Queenborough (1971–1983), President of the Tasmanian Legislative Council (1981–1983); His sons:
  - Peter Hodgman (born 1946), Independent/Liberal Member of the Tasmanian House of Assembly for Franklin (1986–2001), Member of the Tasmanian Legislative Council for Huon (1974–1986); And:
  - Michael Hodgman (1938–2013), Liberal Member of the Australian House of Representatives for Denison (1975–1987), Member of the Tasmanian House of Assembly for Denison (1992-1998, 2001-2010) and Huon (1966–1974), minister in the Fraser government (1980–1983); His son:
    - Will Hodgman (born 1969), Liberal Premier of Tasmania (2014–2020), Member of the Tasmanian House of Assembly for Franklin (2002–2020).

=== Holland ===
- Jack Holland (1877–1955), Labor Member of the Victorian Legislative Assembly for Flemington (1925–1945, 1955) and Footscray (1945–1955); His son:
  - Kevin Holland (1910–1996), Labor Member of the Victorian Legislative Assembly for Flemington (1956–1967), Melbourne City Councillor (1951–1975).

=== Hood ===
- Lucy Hood, member of the South Australian House of Assembly for Adelaide 2022 – present.
- Ben Hood, member of the South Australian Legislative Council 2023 – present, candidate for Mount Gambier in 2022.

=== Horne ===
- Bob Horne (born 1939), Labor Member of the Australian House of Representatives for Paterson (1993-1996, 1998-2001); His daughter:
  - Melissa Horne, Labor Member of the Victorian Legislative Assembly for Williamstown (2018-), Minister in the Andrews and Allan governments (2018-).

=== Hughes ===
The Hughes family has a long history in both New South Wales and Federal politics.

- Sir Thomas Hughes was the first Lord Mayor of Sydney and member of the New South Wales Legislative Council from 1908 until 1930. His brother,
- John Francis Hughes was also an MLC, serving from 1895 until 1912. He also served as NSW Minister for Justice and Vice-President of the Executive Council. Their brother in-law,
- John Lane Mullins, husband of Jane Hughes; sister of Sir Thomas and John Hughes, was also an MLC from 1917 until 1934. Their grandson and his great-nephew,
- Tom Hughes, was a Liberal Party of Australia member of the Australian House of Representatives from 1963 until 1972, serving as Attorney-General during the Gorton government. His daughter,
- Lucy Hughes, was the first female Lord Mayor of Sydney, serving from 2003 until 2004.

=== Hunt ===
- Alan Hunt was a member of the Victorian Legislative Council from 1961–1992. His son,
  - Greg Hunt, is the federal member for Flinders, was Minister for the Environment in the Abbott and Turnbull governments.

=== Hunter ===
- Merv Hunter (1926–2013), was Shire President of the City of Lake Macquarie and later a Member of the New South Wales Legislative Assembly for Lake Macquarie (1969–1991). His son;
- Jeff Hunter succeeded him as the member for Lake Macquarie (1991–2007).

== J ==
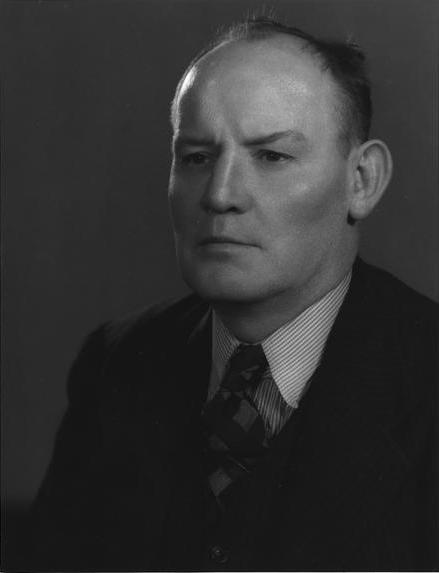
Rowley James (1885–1962)

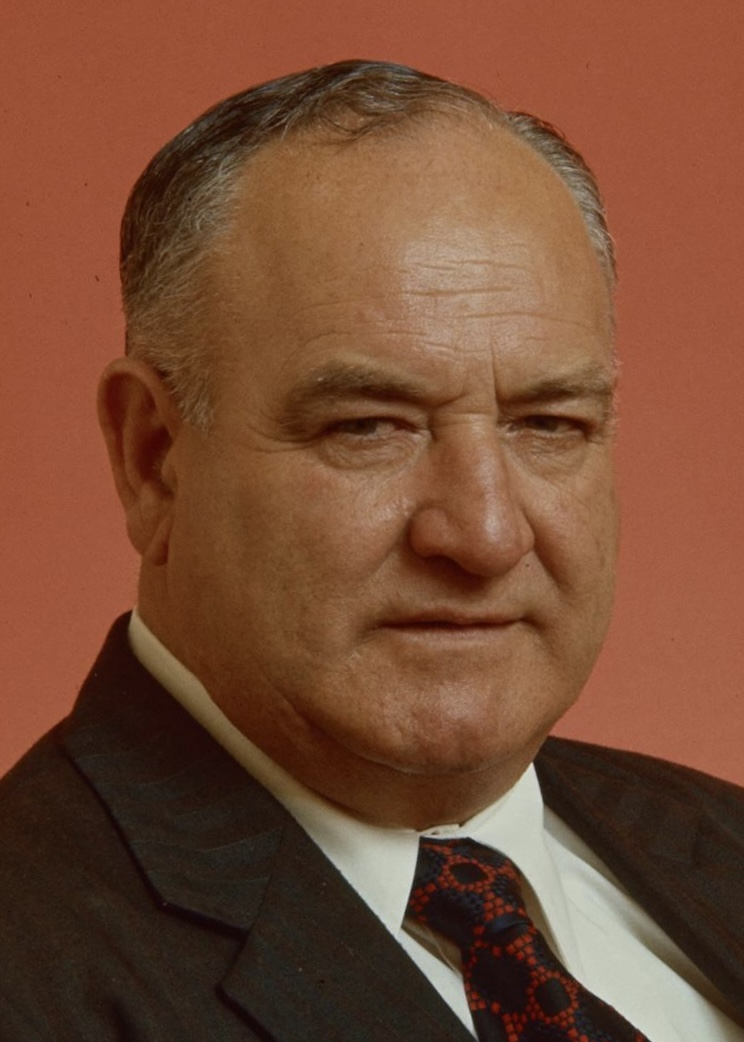
Bert James (1914–2016)

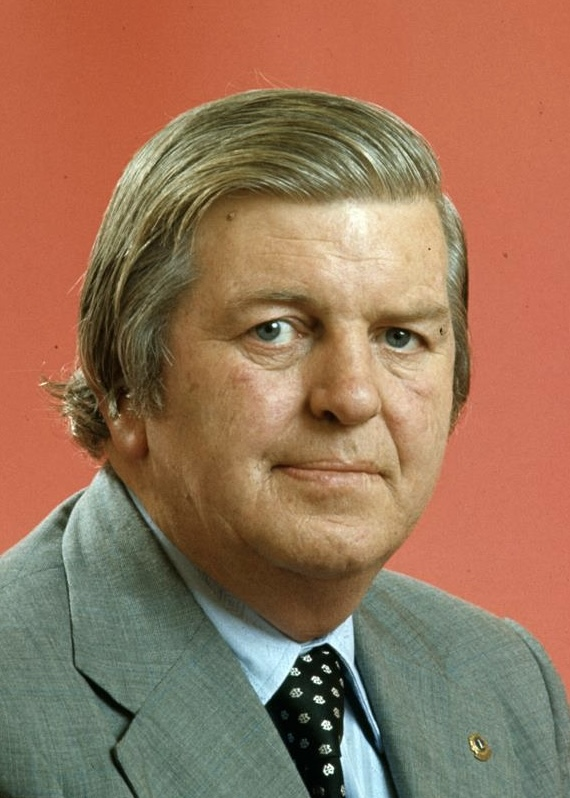
Harry Jenkins, Sr (1925–2004)

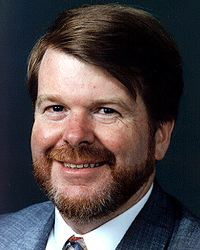
Harry Jenkins (born 1952)

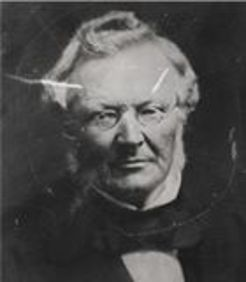
David Jones (1793–1873)

=== James ===
- Rowley James was as a Member of the Australian House of Representatives for Hunter, New South Wales 1924–1958, while his son,
  - Bertie James was Member for the same seat 1960–1980.

=== Jamison ===
- John Jamison (1776–1844), Member of the New South Wales Legislative Council (1837–1843); His son:
  - Robert Jamison (1829–1878), Member of the New South Wales Legislative Assembly for Cook and Westmoreland (1856–1859) and Nepean (1859–1860).

=== Jenkins ===
- Harry Jenkins, Sr was a Member of the Australian House of Representatives for Scullin, Victoria, 1969–1985, while his son,
  - Harry Jenkins was the Member for the same seat from 1986 to 2013. They have both been Speaker of the House of Representatives.

=== Jones ===
- David Jones (1793–1873), Member of the New South Wales Legislative Council (1856–1860), Alderman of the Sydney City Council (1842–1844); His nephew:
  - Rees Jones (1840–1916), Member of the Queensland Legislative Assembly for Rockhampton North (1888–1893).

=== Jones ===
- Charlie Jones, was the Lord Mayor of Newcastle (1956–1957) and later a Member of the Australian House of Representatives for Newcastle (1958–1983), his brother:
- Sam Jones, was a Member of the New South Wales Legislative Assembly for Waratah (1965–1984). He too was previously a local government Councillor on Newcastle Council.

== K ==
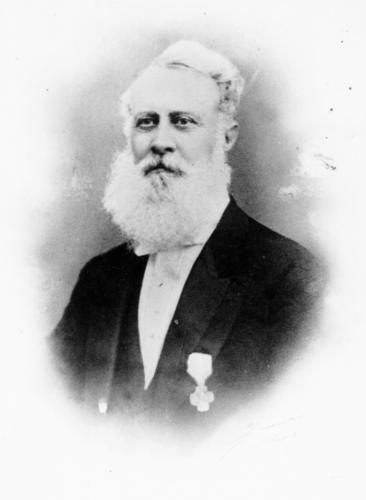
George King (1814–1894)

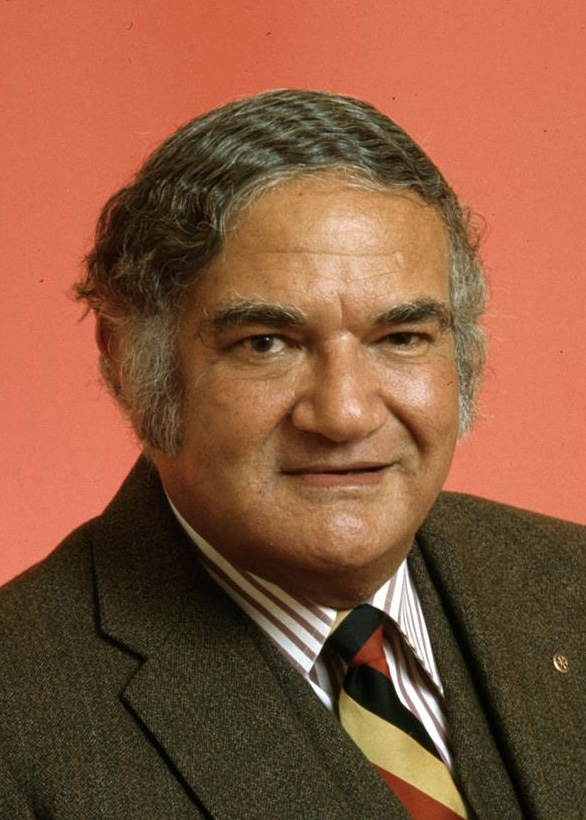
Bob Katter Sr. (1918–1990)

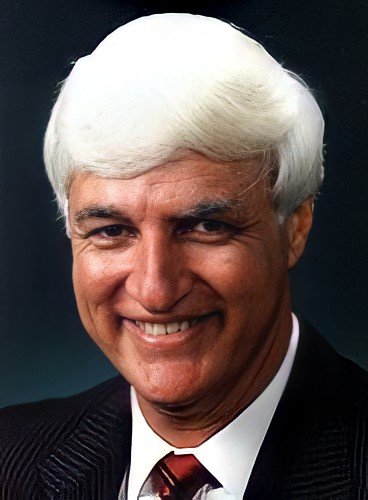
Bob Katter (born 1945)

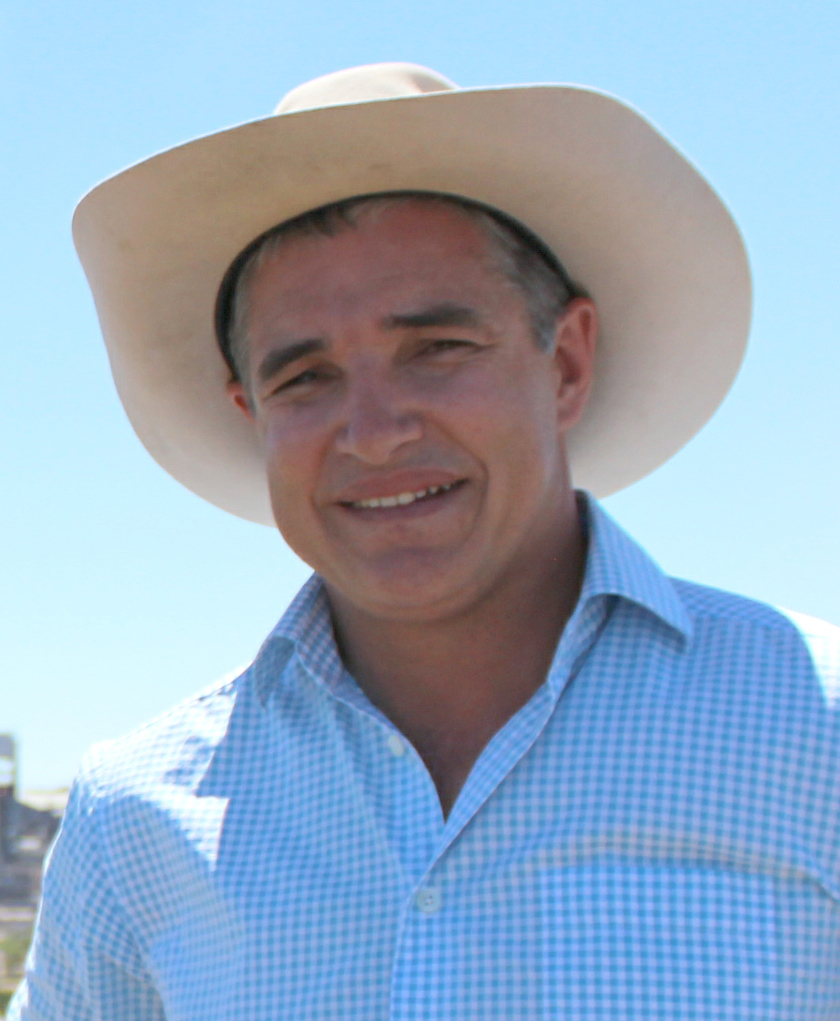
Robbie Katter (born 1977)

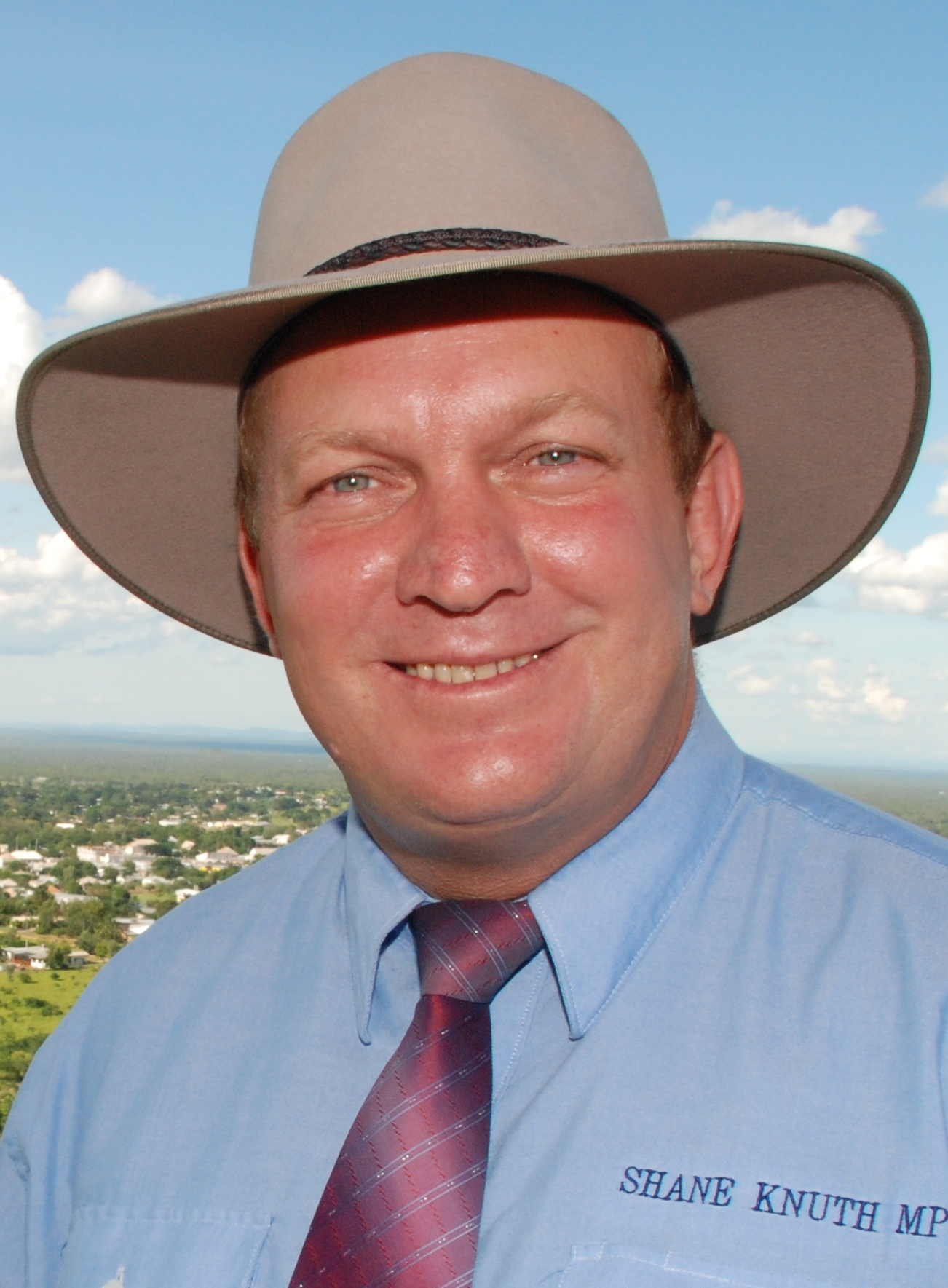
Shane Knuth (born 1966)

=== Katter ===
- Bob Katter Sr., state candidate for Flinders 1957–1958, federal member for Kennedy 1966–1990.
- Bob Katter, state member for Flinders 1974–1992, federal member for Kennedy 1992–present. Bob Katter is also an uncle of Alex Douglas (see Douglas family above).
- Robbie Katter, state member for Mount Isa 2012–2017, state member for Traeger 2017–present
- Carl Katter, federal candidate for Higgins 2015–2016

=== Kennedy ===
- Cyril Kennedy (born 1932), Labor Member of the Victorian Legislative Council for Waverley Province (1979–1992); His brother:
- David Kennedy (born 1940), Labor Member of the Australian House of Representatives for Bendigo (1969–1972), Member of the Victorian Legislative Assembly for Bendigo (1982–1985) and Bendigo West (1985–1992).

=== King ===
- George King (1814–1894), Member of the New South Wales Legislative Assembly for East Sydney (1869–1872), Member of the Queensland Legislative Council (1882–1890); His son:
  - Robert John King (1839–1899), Free Trade Member of the New South Wales Legislative Assembly for Paddington (1889–1891).

=== Kingston ===
- Sir George Strickland Kingston (1807–1880), Speaker of the South Australian House of Assembly (1857–1860, 1865–1880), Member of the South Australian House of Assembly for Stanley (1862–1880) and The Burra and Clare (1857–1860, 1861–1862), Member of the South Australian Legislative Council for The Burra (1851–1857); His son:
  - Charles Kingston (1850–1908), Premier of South Australia (1893–1899), Member of the Australian House of Representatives for South Australia (1901–1903) and Adelaide (1903–1908), Member of the South Australian House of Assembly for West Adelaide (1881–1900), Member of the South Australian Legislative Council (1900), minister in the Downer and Homburg governments (1884–1885, 1887–1889, 1893–1899), minister in the Barton government (1900–1903).

=== Kneebone ===
- Harry Kneebone (1876–1933), Labor Senator for South Australia (1931), Member of the South Australian House of Assembly for East Torrens (1924); His son:
  - Frank Kneebone (1905–2004), Labor member of the South Australian Legislative Council for Central (1961–1975), minister in the Walsh (1965–1968) and Dunstan (1970–1975) governments.

=== Knowles ===
- Stan Knowles, Member for Macquarie Fields in the NSW Legislative Assembly 1981–1990; and his son,
  - Craig Knowles, member for the same seat 1990–2005.

=== Knox ===
- William Knox (1850–1913), Free Trade/Liberal Member of the Australian House of Representatives for Kooyong (1901–1910); His son:
  - Sir George Hodges Knox (1885–1960), Nationalist/UAP/Liberal Speaker of the Victorian Legislative Assembly (1942–1947), Member of the Victorian Legislative Assembly for Upper Yarra (1927–1945) and Scoresby (1945–1960).

=== Knuth ===
- Jeff Knuth (born 1962), One Nation/City Country Alliance Member of the Queensland Legislative Assembly for Burdekin (1998–2001); His brother:
- Shane Knuth (born 1966), National/Katter's Australian Member of the Queensland Legislative Assembly for Charters Towers (2004–2009), Dalrymple (2009–2017) and Hill (2017– ).

== L ==
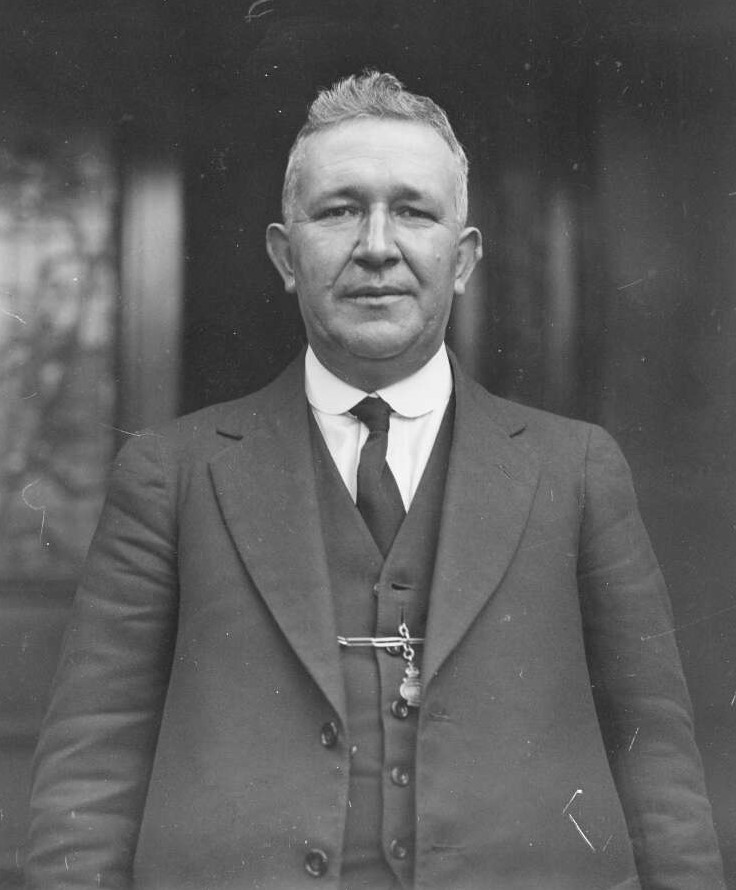
Carlo Lazzarini (1880–1952)

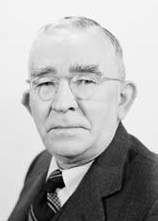
Bert Lazzarini (1884–1952)

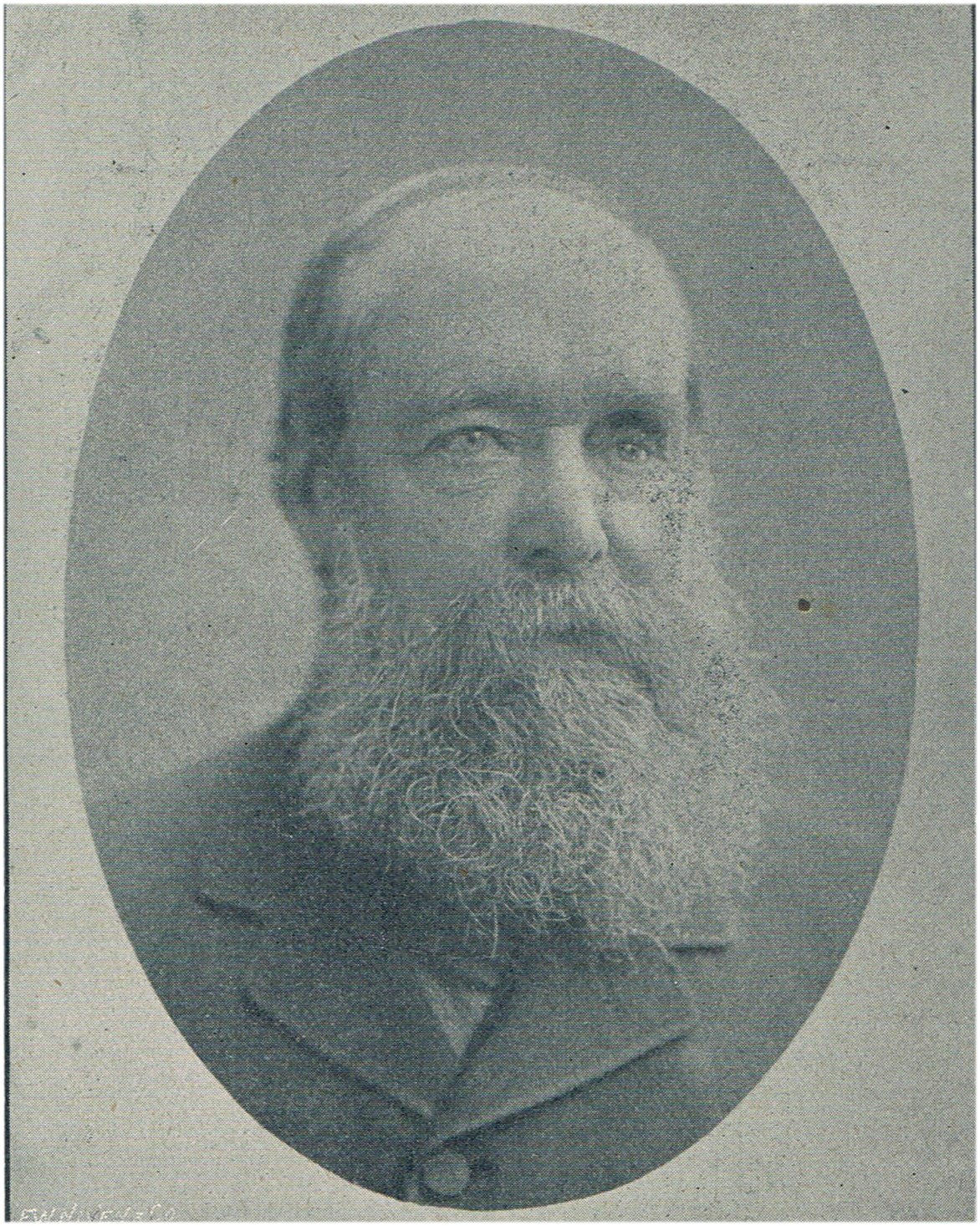
Anthony O'Grady Lefroy (1816–1897)

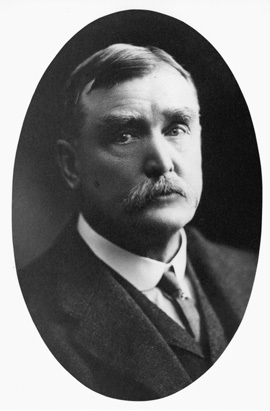
Sir Henry Lefroy (1854–1930)

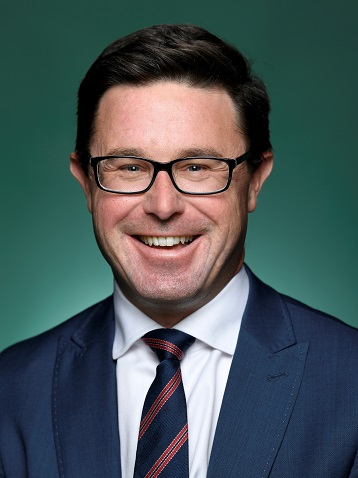
David Littleproud (born 1976)

=== Lamb ===
- Hamilton Lamb (1900–1943), Country Party Member of the Victorian Legislative Assembly for Lowan (1935–1943); His son:
  - Tony Lamb (born 1939), Labor Member of the Australian House of Representatives for Streeton (1984–1990) and La Trobe (1972–1975).

=== Laming ===
- Bruce Laming (1938–2017), Liberal Member of the Queensland Legislative Assembly for Mooloolah; His son:
  - Andrew Laming (born 1966), Liberal/Liberal National Member of the Australian House of Representatives for Bowman (2004–2022).

=== Lang ===
- Jack Lang (1876–1975), Labor Premier of New South Wales (1925–1927, 1930–1932), Member of the Australian House of Representatives for Reid (1946–1949), Member of the New South Wales Legislative Assembly for Granville (1913–1920), Parramatta (1920–1927) and Auburn (1927–1946), minister in the Storey (1920–1921) and Dooley (1921–1922) governments; His son:
  - Chris Lang (1910–2002), Lang Labor Member of the new South Wales Legislative Assembly for Auburn (1946–1950)

=== Lawlor/France ===
- Peter Lawlor (born 1948), Member of the Queensland Parliament for Southport (2001–2012); his daughter
  - Ali France (née Lawlor 1973), Labor Member for Dickson (2025– )

=== Lawrie ===
- Dawn Lawrie, independent Member for Nightcliff in the Northern Territory Legislative Assembly, 1974–1983; her daughter,
  - Delia Lawrie was Labor Member for Karama 2001–2016 and was Leader of the Opposition 2012–15.

=== Lawson ===
- William Lawson (1774–1850), Member of the New South Wales Legislative Assembly for County of Cumberland (1843–1848); His son:
  - Nelson Lawson (1806–1849), Member of the New South Wales Legislative Assembly for County of Cumberland (1848–1849).

=== Lazzarini ===
- Carlo Lazzarini (1880–1952), Labor Member of the New South Wales Legislative Assembly for Marrickville (1917–1920, 1927–1952) and Western Suburbs (1920–1927), minister in the Dooley (1921–1922) and Lang (1925–1927) governments; His brother:
- Bert Lazzarini (1884–1952), Labor Member of the Australian House of Representatives for Werriwa (1919–1931, 1934–1952), minister in the Curtin, Forde and Chifley governments (1941–1946).

=== Leake ===
- George Leake (1786–1849), Member of the Western Australian Legislative Council (1839–1849), Mayor of Perth (1838–1840); His nephews:
  - Sir Luke Leake (1828–1886), Member of the Western Australian Legislative Council (1872–1886), Mayor of Perth (1856); And:
  - George Walpole Leake (1825–1895), Member of the Western Australian Legislative Council (1879–1880, 1883, 1890–1891); His son:
    - George Leake (1856–1902), Premier of Western Australia (1901, 1901–1902), Member of the Western Australian Legislative Assembly for Roebourne (1890), Albany (1894–1900) and West Perth (1901–1902), Member of the Western Australian Legislative Council (1886, 1888).

=== Lee Steere ===
- James George Lee Steere (1830–1903), Speaker of the Western Australian Legislative Assembly (1890-1903), Member of the Western Australian Legislative Assembly for Nelson (1890-1903), Member of the Western Australian Legislative Council for Wellington (1870-1880) and Swan (1880-1884); His grandson:
  - Ernest Henry Lee-Steere (1912–2011), Lord Mayor of Perth (1972–1978); His cousin:
  - John Dawkins (born 1947) (see Dawkins family)

=== Lefroy ===
- Anthony O'Grady Lefroy (1816–1897), Colonial Treasurer of Western Australia (1856–1890), Member of the Western Australian Legislative Council (1875–1877), Colonial Secretary of Western Australia (1875–1877); His son:
  - Sir Henry Lefroy (1854–1930), Liberal/Nationalist Premier of Western Australia (1917–1919), Member of the Western Australian Legislative Assembly for Moore (1892–1901, 1911–1921), Agent-General for Western Australia (1901–1904), minister in the Wilson government(1916–1917).

=== Lemmon ===
- John Lemmon was the Labor member for Williamstown in the Victorian Legislative Assembly from 1904 to 1955—at nearly 51 years, the longest term in the Victorian parliament's history. His son,
  - Nelson Lemmon, was a federal Labor MP for the seats of Forrest (WA; 1943–1949) and St George (NSW; 1954–1955), and a minister in the Chifley government.

=== Lewis ===
Brothers

- Sandy Lewis (1931–2016), MP for Blackwood, Western Australia 1972–1989
- Tom Lewis (1922 –2016), 33rd Premier of New South Wales 1975 – 1976

their grandfather

- John Lewis (1844–1923), member of the South Australian Legislative Council 1898 – 1923

=== Littleproud ===
- Brian Littleproud, (1941– ), Member of the Queensland Legislative Assembly 1983–2001, and his son:
- David Littleproud, (1976– ), Member of the Australian House of Representatives from 2016. minister in the Turnbull and Morrison governments and leader of the Nationals from 2022.

=== Lyne ===
- Sir William Lyne (1844–1913), Protectionist Premier of New South Wales (1899–1901), Member of the New South Wales Legislative Assembly for Hume (1880–1901), Member of the Australian House of Representatives for Hume (1901–1913), minister in the Barton and Deakin governments (1901–1904, 1905–1908); His brother:
- Carmichael Lyne (1861–1929), Member of the Tasmanian House of Assembly for Ringarooma (1900–1906), minister in the Propsting government (1903–1904).

=== Lyons ===
- Joseph Lyons (1879–1939) was Tasmanian Leader of the Opposition 1916–23, 1928–29; Premier of Tasmania 1923–28; federal Member for Wilmot 1929–39; Leader of the Opposition 1931–32; 10th Prime Minister of Australia 1932–39. Wife;
- Dame Enid Lyons (1897–1981) was MHR for Darwin 1943–51. First female member of the House of Representatives. Minister in the Menzies Government. Sons;
- Kevin Lyons (1923–2000): MP for Braddon (TAS) 1948–69. Deputy Premier of Tasmania 1969–72. Brother;
- Brendan Lyons: MP for Bass (TAS) 1982–86.

== M ==
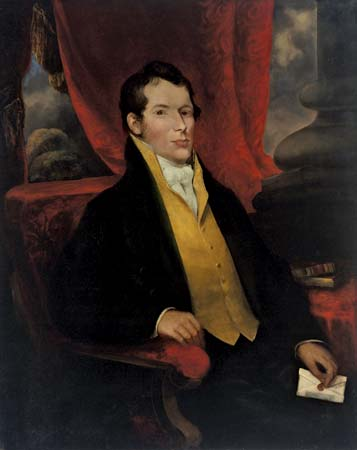
John Macarthur (1767–1834)

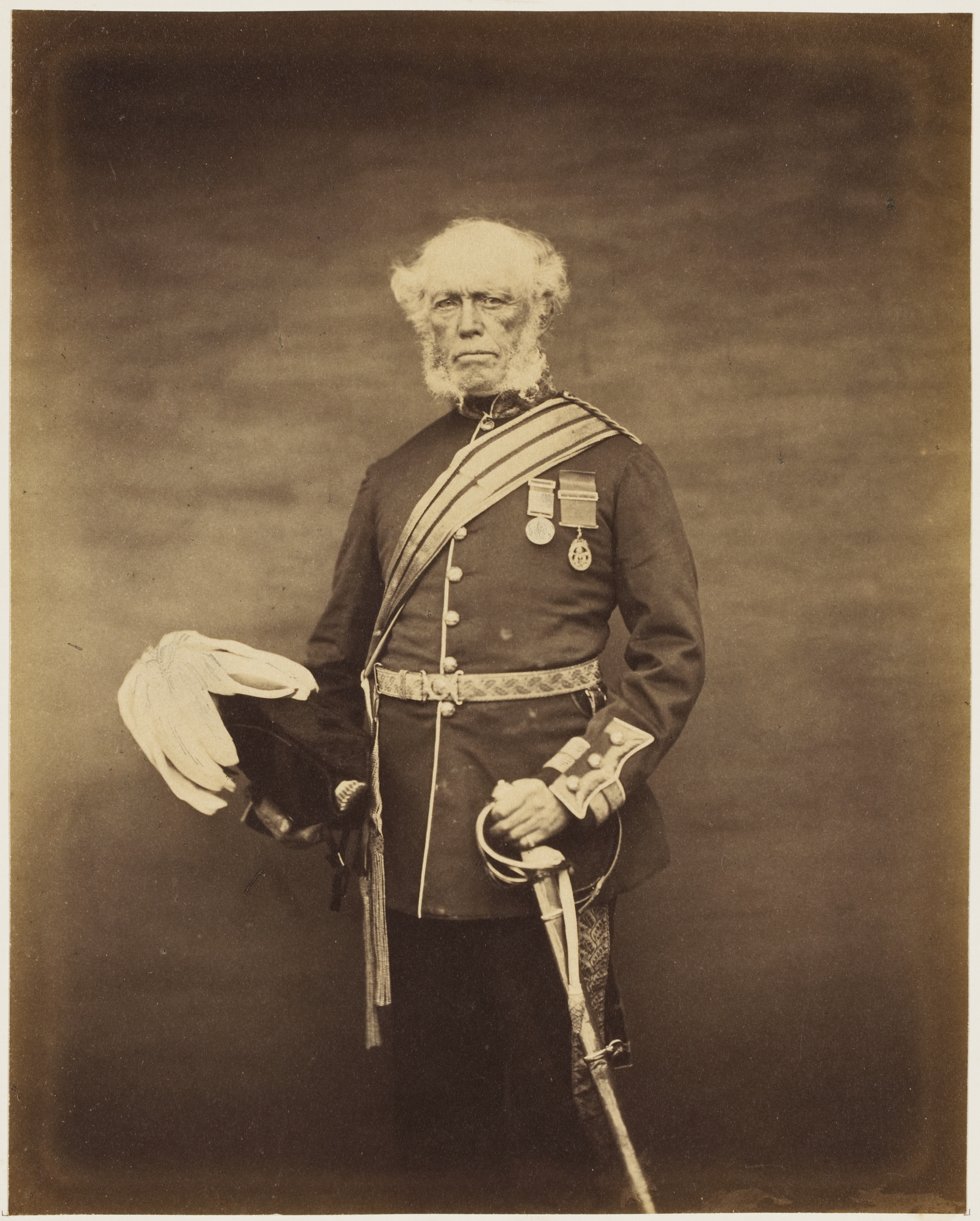
Edward Macarthur (1789–1872)

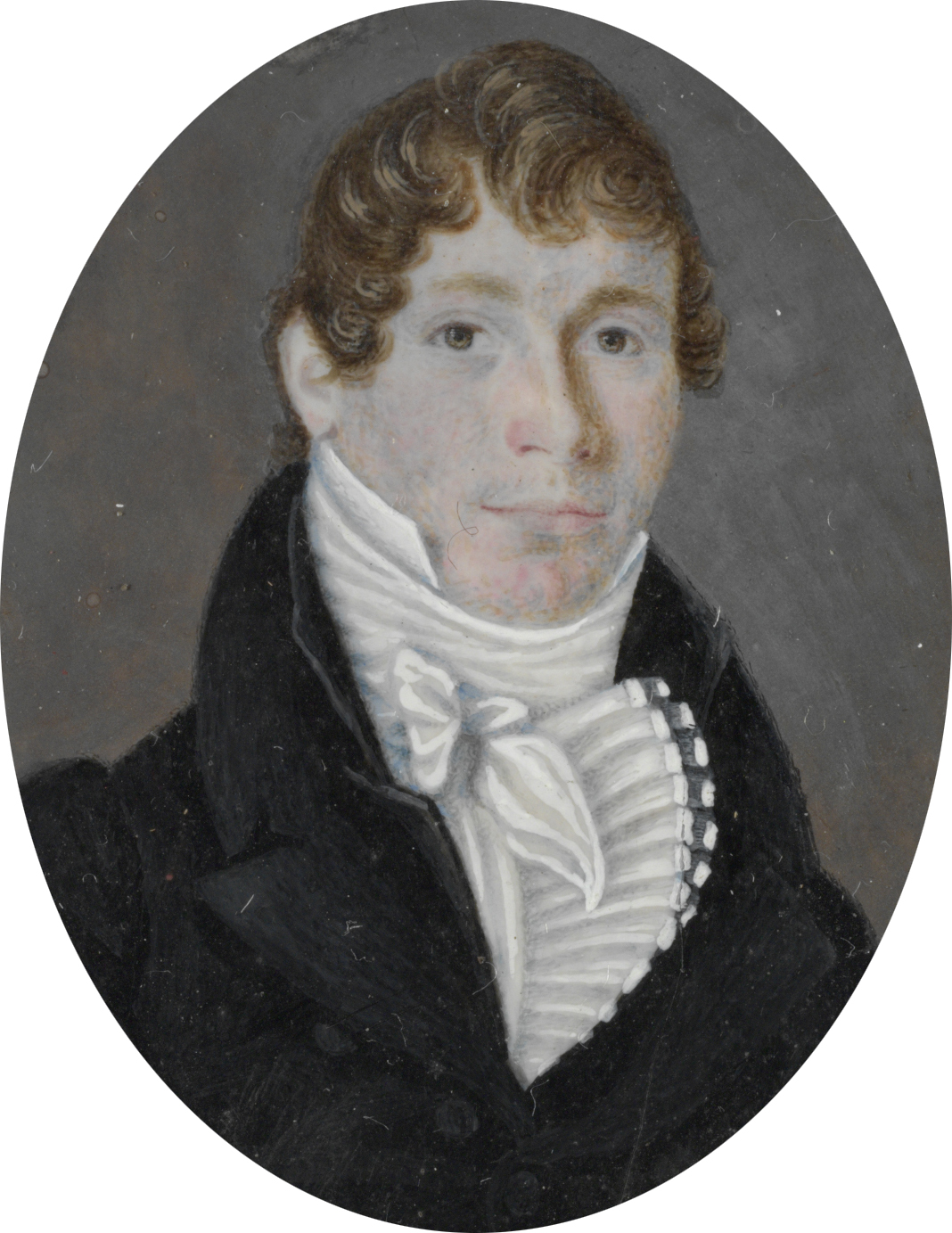
James Macarthur (1798–1867)

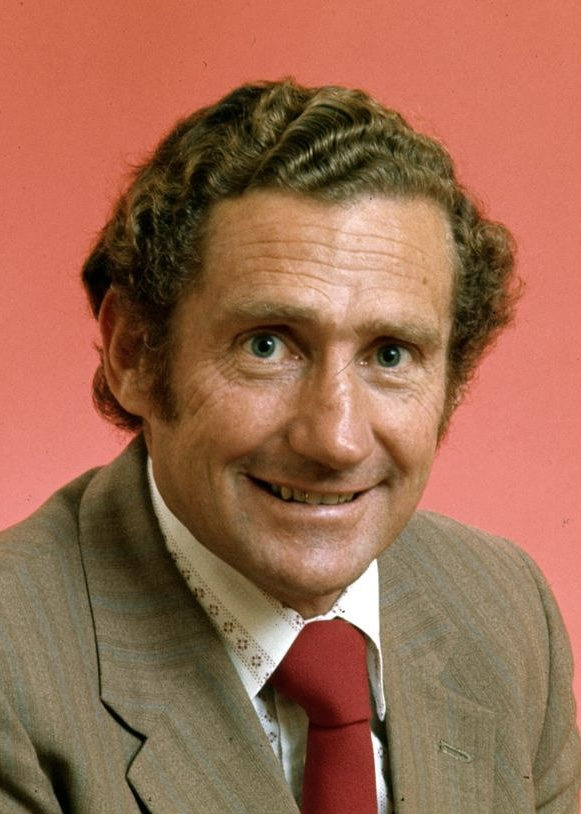
Tom McVeigh (born 1930)

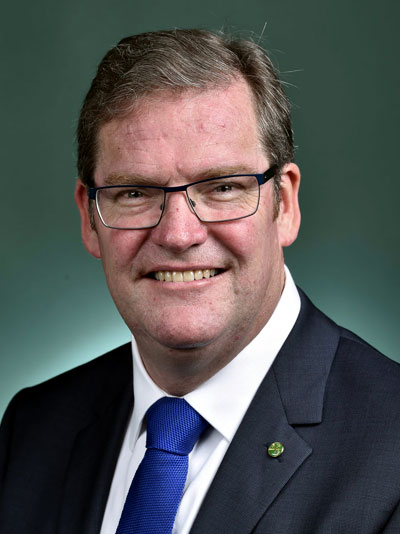
John McVeigh (born 1965)

=== Macarthur ===
- John Macarthur (1767–1834), Colonial Secretary of New South Wales (1808–1809), Member of the New South Wales Legislative Council (1825–1832), His sons:
  - Sir William Macarthur (1800–1882), Member of the New South Wales Legislative Council for Port Phillip (1849–1851) and Pastoral Districts and Lower Darling (1851–1855), lifetime appointment (1864–1882);
  - Edward Macarthur (1789–1872), Administrator of the Colony of Victoria (1855–1856); and:
  - James Macarthur (1798–1867), Member of the New South Wales Legislative Council as an appointment (1839–1843), for County of Camden (1848–1856), County of West Camden (1856–1859) and as a lifetime appointment (1866–1867); His cousin, and John Macarthur's nephew:
  - Hannibal Hawkins Macarthur (1788–1861), Member of the New South Wales Legislative Council for Parramatta (1830–1848).

=== Macleay ===
- Alexander Macleay (1767–1848), Colonial Secretary of New South Wales (1826–1837), Member of the New South Wales Legislative Council as an appointment (1825–1836) and for Counties of Gloucester, Macquarie, and Stanley (1843–1848); His son:
  - Sir William John Macleay (1820–1891), Member of the New South Wales Legislative Council for Pastoral Districts of Lachlan and Lower Darling (1855–1856), Member of the New South Wales Legislative Assembly for Lachlan and Lower Darling (1856–1859) and Murrumbidgee (1860–1874).

=== Macrossan ===
- John Macrossan (1832–1891), Member of the Queensland Legislative Assembly for Kennedy (1873–1878) and Townsville (1879–1891); His sons:
  - Hugh Denis Macrossan (1881–1940), Member of the Queensland Legislative Assembly for Windsor (1912–1915), Chief Justice of Queensland (1940);
  - Neal Macrossan (1889–1955), Chief Justice of Queensland (1946–1955); His nephew:
    - John Murtagh Macrossan (1930–2008), Chief Justice of Queensland (1989–1998).

=== Mann ===
- Charles Mann (1799–1860), Advocate-General of South Australia (1837–1838, 1850–1851); His son:
  - Charles Mann Jr (1838–1889), Member of the South Australian House of Assembly for Burra (1870–1875) and Stanley (1875–1881), minister in the Hart, Blyth, Boucat and Morgan governments (1871–1881).

=== Marmion ===
- William Marmion (1845–1896), Member of the Western Australian Legislative Council (1870–1890), Member of the Western Australian Legislative Assembly for Fremantle (1890–1896); minister in the Forrest government (1890–1894); His great-grandson:
  - Bill Marmion (born 1954), Liberal Member of the Western Australian Legislative Assembly for Nedlands (2008–2021), minister in the Barnett government (2010–2017).

=== Marwick ===
- Warren Marwick (1869–1955), Member of the Western Australian Legislative Council for East Province (1910–1912); His son:
  - Thomas Marwick (1895–1960), Country Senator for Western Australia (1936–1937), Member of the Australian House of Representatives for Swan (1940–1943),

=== McClelland ===
- Alfred McClelland, (1886–1969) (MP for Northern Tablelands) 1920–27, (Dubbo) 1930–32. Son;
- Doug McClelland (born 1926) (Senator for NSW) 1962–87. Minister in the Whitlam government and President of the Australian Senate. Son;
- Robert McClelland (born 1958) (MHR for Barton) 1996–2013 and was a minister in the Rudd-Gillard government.

=== McColl ===
- Hugh McColl (1819–1885), Member of the Victorian Legislative Assembly for Mandurang (1880–1885); His son:
- James McColl (1844–1929), Protectionist/Liberal Senator for Victoria (1907–1914), Member of the Australian House of Representatives for Echuca (1901–1906), Member of the Victorian Legislative Assembly for Mandurang (1886–1889) and Gunbower (1889–1901), minister in the Cook government (1913–1914).

=== McGirr ===
- Greg McGirr (1879–1949) Member of the NSW Legislative Assembly (1913–1925). His daughter
- Trixie Gardner Baroness Gardner of Parkes (1927–2024) was created a life peer in the House of Lords in 1981. Her uncle:
- James McGirr, 28th Premier of NSW (6 February 1947 – 2 April 1952)
- Joe McGirr (born 19 June 1960), Independent Member for the NSW Electoral district of Wagga Wagga since 2018 is grandson of Greg McGirr

=== McIntyre/Fletcher ===
- Donald McIntyre (1851–1927), Kidsonite Member of the Queensland Legislative Assembly for Aubigny (1907–1908); His nephew:
  - Malcolm McIntyre (1889–1969), Country member of the Queensland Legislative Assembly for Cunningham (1944–1953); His nephew:
    - Sir Alan Fletcher (1907–1991), Country member of the Queensland Legislative Assembly for Cunningham (1953–1974), Speaker of the Queensland Legislative Assembly (1957–1960) and minister in the Nicklin, Pizzey and Bjelke-Petersen governments (1960–1974).

=== McKechnie ===
- Henry McKechnie (1915–1984), Country Member of the Queensland Legislative Assembly for Carnarvon (1963–1974), minister in the Bjelke-Petersen Government (1972–1974); His son:
  - Peter McKechnie (1941–2011), National Member of the Queensland Legislative Assembly for Carnarvon (1974–1989), minister in the Bjelke-Petersen and Ahern governments (1983–1989).

=== McLachlan ===
- James McLachlan Sr. (1842–1904), National Defence Member of the South Australian House of Assembly for Wooroora (1893–1902); His son:
  - James McLachlan (1871–1956), UAP/Liberal Senator for South Australia (1935–1947), Member of the South Australian House of Assembly for Wooroora (1918–1930); His son:
    - Roy McLachlan (1901–1973), LCL Member of the South Australian House of Assembly for Victoria (1947–1953).

=== McLarty ===
- John McLarty (1842–1909), MLA in Western Australia 1904–1909; brother of Edward
- Edward McLarty (1848–1917), MLC in Western Australia 1894–1916; brother of John
- Ross McLarty (1891–1962), MLA in Western Australia 1930–1962, Premier 1947–1953; son of Edward

=== McLaurin ===
- James McLaurin (1821–1891), Member of the New South Wales Legislative Assembly for Hume (1872–1873); His son:
  - Gordon McLaurin (1862–1917), Progressive/Independent Liberal Member of the New South Wales Legislative Assembly for Hume (1901–1904) and Albury (1904–1913).

=== McLeod (Daylesford, Victoria) ===
- Donald McLeod (1837–1923), Liberal/Nationalist Member of the Victorian Legislative Assembly for Daylesford (1900–1923), minister in the Irvine and Bent governments (1902–1909), minister in the Peacock government (1915–1917); His son:
  - Roderick McLeod (1862–1924), Nationalist Member of the Victorian Legislative Assembly for Daylesford (1923–1924).

=== McLeod (Portland, Victoria) ===
- Norman McLeod (1816–1886), Member of the Victorian Legislative Assembly for Portland (1859–1860); His son:
  - Donald Norman McLeod (1848–1914), Member of the Victorian Legislative Assembly for Portland (1894–1900).

=== McMahon/Walder ===
- William McMahon (1908–1988), federal Member for Lowe; Minister in the Menzies Government (1949–66), Holt government (1966–67), McEwen government (1967–68) and Gorton government (1968–1971); 20th Prime Minister of Australia 1971–72. Uncle;
- Samuel Walder (1879–1946), Lord Mayor of Sydney 1932–33, Member of the Legislative Council of New South Wales 1932–43

=== McVeigh ===
- Tom McVeigh (born 1930), National Member of the Australian House of Representatives for Darling Downs (1972–1984) and Groom (1984–1988), minister in the Fraser government (1980–1983); His son:
  - John McVeigh (born 1965), National/Liberal National Member of the Queensland Legislative Assembly for Toowoomba South (2012–2016), Member of the Australian House of Representatives for Groom (2016–2020), minister in the Newman government (2012–2016), minister in the Turnbull and Morrison governments (2017–2018).

=== Melloy/Darling ===
- Jack Melloy (1908–2006), Member of the Queensland Legislative Assembly for Nudgee (1960–1977)
- his daughter Elaine Darling (born 1936), Member of the Australian House of Representatives for Lilley (1980–1993)
- his granddaughter and her daughter Vicky Darling (born 1966), Member of the Queensland Legislative Assembly for Sandgate (2006–2012), Minister for Environment (2011–2012)
- his cousin once removed and role model, Walter Russell Crampton (1877—1938), Member of the Queensland Legislative Council (1917–1922)

=== Menzies/Leckie ===
- Sir Robert Menzies, 12th and longest serving Prime Minister of Australia. Member of the Australian House of Representatives for Kooyong (1934–1966), Deputy Premier of Victoria (1932–1934) and Member of the Legislative Assembly of Victoria for Nunawading (1929–1934).
- his father James Menzies, was a Member of the Legislative Assembly of Victoria for Lowan (1911–1920)
- his uncle Hugh Menzies, was a Member of the Legislative Assembly of Victoria for Stawell (1902–1904)
- his uncle Sydney Sampson was a Member of the Australian House of Representatives for Wimmera (1906–1919)
- his father in-law John Leckie was a Member of the Australian House of Representatives for Indi (1917–1919) and Senator for Victoria (1935–1947)
- his brother in-law Roland Leckie was a Member of the Legislative Assembly of Victoria for Evelyn (1950–1952)
- his cousin Douglas Menzies was a Judge on the High Court of Australia (1958–1974)

=== Miles/Vallentine/Fisher ===
- George Miles served in the Western Australian Legislative Council from 1916 to 1950, his great niece
  - Jo Vallentine was an independent / Greens senator for Western Australia from 1985 to 1992 and his great-granddaughter
    - Mary Jo Fisher was a Liberal Party senator for South Australia from 2007 to 2012.

=== Morgan ===
- James Morgan, Member for Warwick in the Queensland Legislative Assembly (1870–1871, 1873–1878)
  - his son Arthur Morgan, Premier of Queensland (1903–1906)
    - his son Arthur Morgan, Member of the Australian House of Representatives for Darling Downs (1929–1931)

=== Morrison ===
- John Douglas Morrison was a police officer who served as Mayor of Waverley from 1985–1986
- Scott Morrison, 31st Prime Minister of Australia (2018–2022), former leader of the Liberal Party, member for Cook (2006–2024)

=== Morris ===
- Allan Morris, was a Member of the Australian House of Representatives for Newcastle (1983–2001), his brother:
- Peter Morris, was for a time concurrently a Member of the Australian House of Representatives for Shortland (1972–1998), and his son:
- Matthew Morris was a Member of the New South Wales Legislative Assembly for Charlestown (2003–2011) and Councillor on City of Lake Macquarie before entering state parliament

=== Morris/Wilson ===
- David Morris was a councillor in the Shire of Mornington (1987–1994) and is member for Mornington in the Victorian Legislative Assembly (2006–present). His stepson
- Tim Wilson, Member of the Australian House of Representatives for Goldstein (2016–2022)

=== Muller ===
- Alf Muller (1889–1970), Country/Independent Member of the Queensland Legislative Assembly for Electoral district of Fassifern (1935–1969), minister in the Nicklin Government (1957–1960); His son:
  - Selwyn Muller (1917–2008), Country/National Member of the Queensland Legislative Assembly for Fassifern (1969–1983), Speaker of the Queensland Legislative Assembly (1979–1983).

=== Murphy ===
- Francis Murphy (1809–1891), Member of the Victorian Legislative Assembly for Murray (1851–1856), Murray Boroughs (1856–1865), Grenville (1866–1871) and Eastern Province (1872–1876), Speaker of the Victorian Legislative Assembly (1856–1871); His son:
  - Frank Murphy (1844–1892), Member of the Queensland Legislative Assembly for Barcoo (1885–1892).

=== Murray ===
- Sir Terence Aubrey Murray (1810–1873), Member of the New South Wales Legislative Council for Counties of Murray, King and Georgiana (1843–1856), Member of the New South Wales Legislative Assembly for Southern Boroughs (1856–1856) and Argyle (1856–1862), New South Wales Minister for Lands and Property (1856–1858), Speaker of the New South Wales Legislative Assembly (1860–1862), President of the New South Wales Legislative Council (1862–1873); His son:
- Sir Hubert Murray (1861–1940), Lieutenant-Governor of Papua (1908–1940); His nephew:
  - Hubert Leonard Murray (1886–1963), Resident magistrate of Papua (1940), Administrator of Papua (1940–1942).

=== Murray-Prior ===
- Thomas Murray-Prior (1819–1892), Member of the Queensland Legislative Council (1866–1892); His son:
  - Thomas de Montmorency Murray-Prior (1848–1902), Member of the Queensland Legislative Assembly for Fassifern (1902).

=== Mutton ===
- Charlie Mutton (1890–1989), Labor/Progressive Labor Member of the Victorian Legislative Assembly for Electoral district of Coburg (1940–1967), Councillor for the City of Broadmeadows (1925–1953); His son:
  - Jack Mutton (1915–2006), Labor/Progressive Labor/Independent Member of the Victorian Legislative Assembly for Electoral district of Coburg (1967–1979), Councillor for the City of Broadmeadows (1954–1970), Mayor of Broadmeadows (1957–1958, 1966–1967).

== N ==
=== Nalder ===
- Sir Crawford Nalder was Deputy Premier of Western Australia from 1962 to 1971. His son
- Cambell Nalder, was a member of the Western Australian Legislative Assembly from 1986 to 1987. His son
- Dean Nalder, was a member of the Legislative Assembly from 2013 to 2021 and was the Transport minister in the Western Australian Government.

=== Newman ===
- Kevin Newman (1933–99) – (MP for Bass (TAS)) 1975–84. Minister in the Fraser government. His wife
- Jocelyn Newman (1937–2018) – (Senator for Tasmania) 1986–2002. She was a Minister in the Howard government. Their son;
- Campbell Newman (born 1963) – Lord Mayor of Brisbane 2004–2011, Premier of Queensland 2012–2015.

=== Nicholls ===
- Theo Nicholls (1894–1977), Labor Senator for South Australia (1944–1968); His nephew:
  - Martin Nicholls (1917–1983), Labor Member of the Australian House of Representatives for Bonython (1963–1977).

=== Nott ===
- Frederick Lancelot Nott (1874—1927), Member of the Queensland Legislative Assembly for Stanley (1920–1927)
- his brother Lewis Windermere Nott (1886—1951), Member of the Australian House of Representatives for Herbert (1925–1928) and Australian Capital Territory (1949–1951)

== O ==
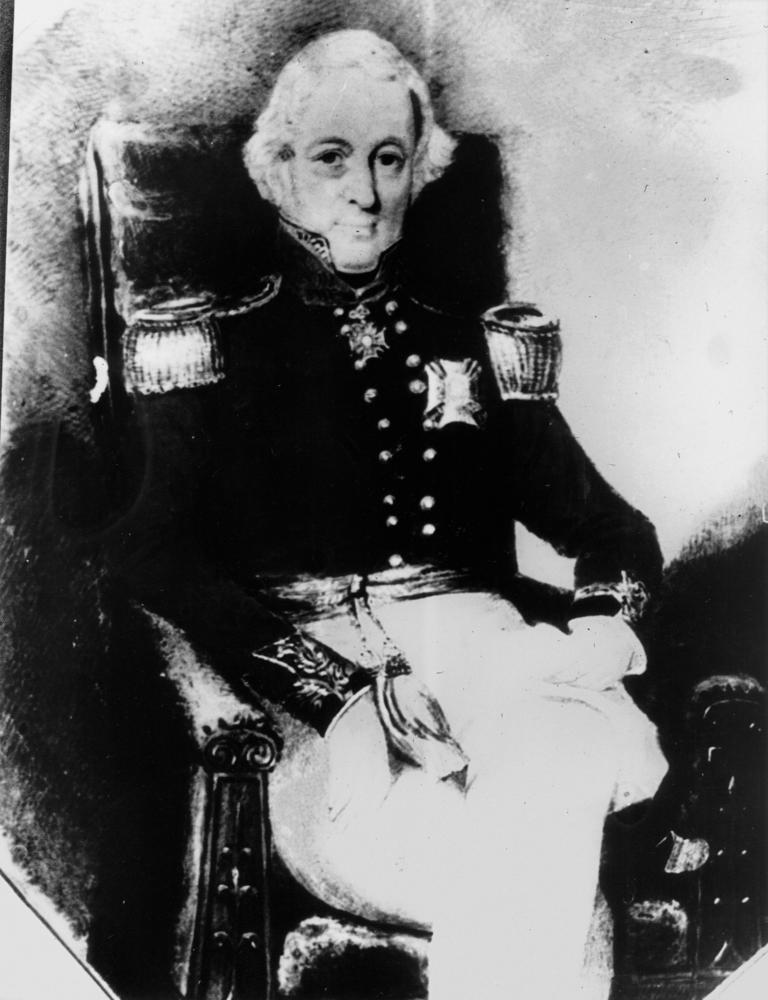
Sir Maurice Charles Philip O'Connell (1768–1848)

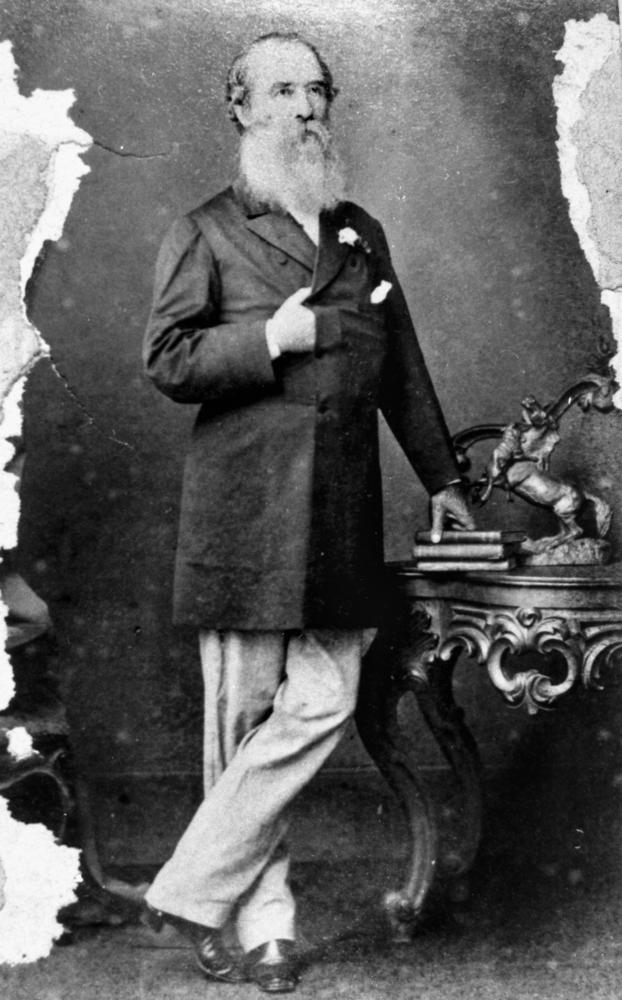
Sir Maurice Charles O'Connell (1812–1879)

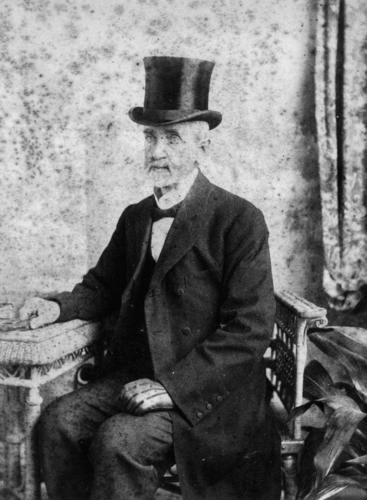
Patrick O'Sullivan (1818–1904)

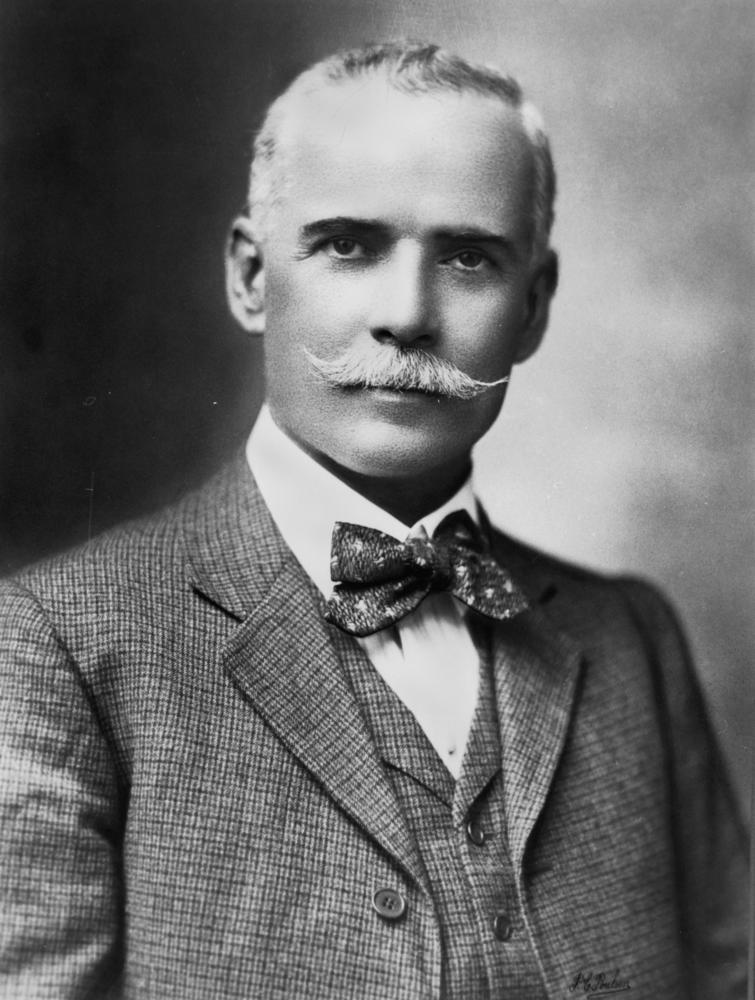
Thomas O'Sullivan (1856–1953)

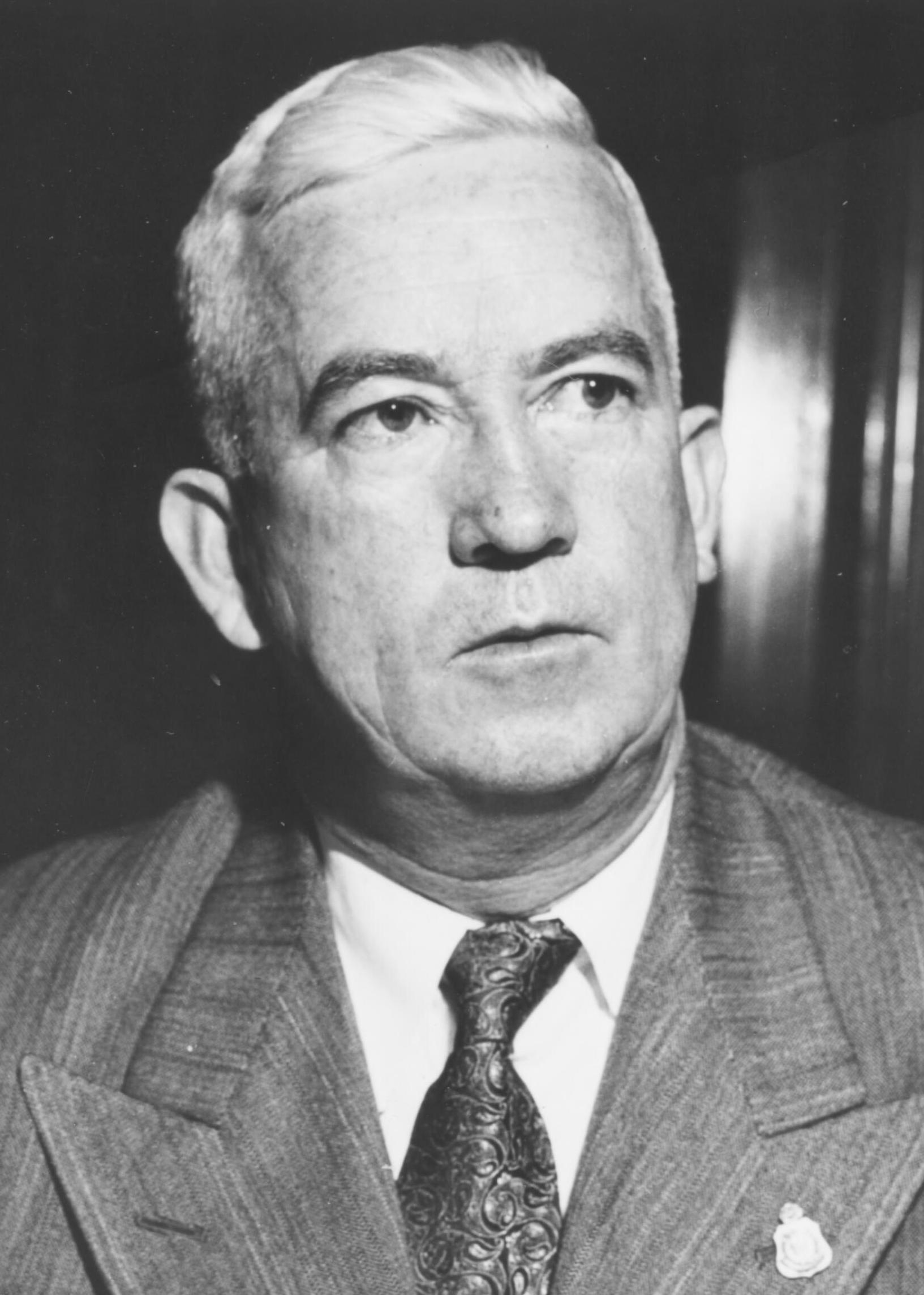
Neil O'Sullivan (1900–1968)

=== O'Byrne ===
- Justin O'Byrne (1912–1993), Member of the Australian Senate for Tasmania (1947–81); President of the Australian Senate (1974–75); His distant cousins:
- David O'Byrne (born 1969), Member of the Tasmanian House of Assembly for Franklin (2010–2014, 2018–); Leader of the Opposition of Tasmania (2021); His sister:
- Michelle O'Byrne (born 1968), Member of the Tasmanian House of Assembly for Bass (2006–2025); Speaker of the Tasmanian House of Assembly (2024–2025)

=== O'Connell ===
- Sir Maurice Charles Philip O'Connell (1768–1848), Lieutenant-Governor of New South Wales (1810–1814), Member of the New South Wales Legislative Council (1838–1848); His son:
  - Sir Maurice Charles O'Connell (1812–1879), Member of the New South Wales Legislative Council (1845–1848), Member of the Queensland Legislative Council (1860–1879), President of the Queensland Legislative Council (1860–1879), Administrator of Queensland (1868, 1871, 1874–1875, 1877); His nephew:
    - William O'Connell (1852–1903), Member of the Queensland Legislative Assembly for Musgrave (1888–1903), minister in the Philp government (1899–1903).

Sir Maurice Charles O'Connell's maternal grandfather was William Bligh, Governor of New South Wales (1806–1808).

=== Ogilvie ===
- Albert Ogilvie (1890–1939), Premier of Tasmania (1934–1939), Member of the Tasmanian House of Assembly for Franklin (1919–1939)
- his brother Eric Ogilvie (1892–1962) Member of the Tasmanian House of Assembly for Wilmot (1928–1940)
- Eric's granddaughter Madeleine Ogilvie (1969–) Member of the Tasmanian House of Assembly for Denison (2014–2018) and Clark (2019–).

=== Oldfield ===
- Edward "Ted" Oldfield (1920–1990), Member of the Western Australian Legislative Assembly for Maylands (1951–1956; 1962–1965) and Mount Lawley (1956–1962)
- his nephew David Oldfield (1958–present), co-founder and Vice President of Pauline Hanson's One Nation (1997–2000), President of One Nation New South Wales (2001–2004), Member of the New South Wales Legislative Council (1999–2007)

=== O'Sullivan/MacGroarty ===
- Patrick O'Sullivan, Member of the Queensland Legislative Assembly for Ipswich
  - His son, Thomas O'Sullivan, Member of the Queensland Legislative Assembly for Warwick and Member of the Queensland Legislative Council
  - His grandson, Neil O'Sullivan, Australian Senator for Queensland
    - His uncle Neil MacGroarty

=== Osborne ===
- Alick Osborne (1972–1856), Member of the New South Wales Legislative Council for Counties of Murray and St Vincent (1851–1855); His brother:
- Henry Osborne (1803–1859), Member of the New South Wales Legislative Council for County of Camden (1851–1856), Member of the New South Wales Legislative Assembly for East Camden (1856–1857); his sons:
  - Patrick Osborne (1832–1902), Member of the New South Wales Legislative Assembly for Electoral district of Illawarra (1864–1866); and
  - James Osborne (1845–1877), Member of the New South Wales Legislative Assembly for Electoral district of Illawarra (1869–1872).

== P ==
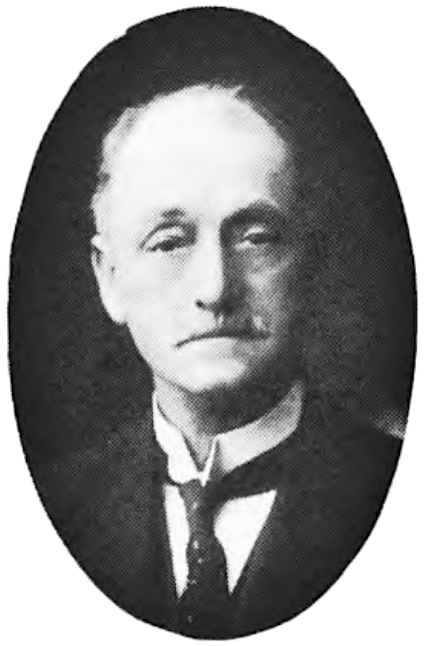
Alfred Piesse (1866–1939)

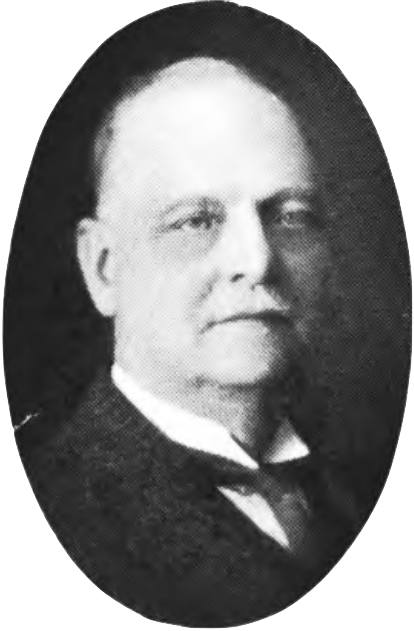
Arnold Piesse (1872–1935)

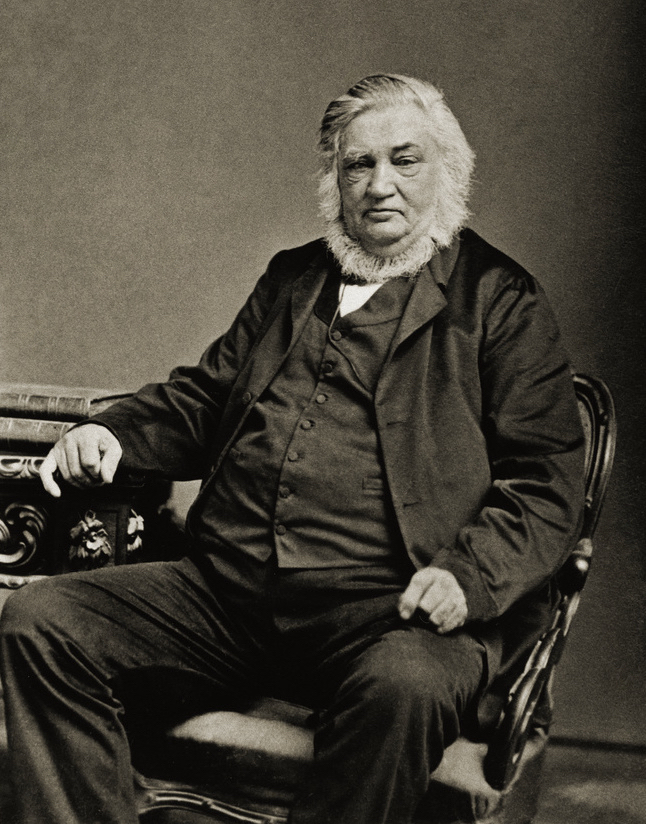
Thomas Playford I (1795–1873)

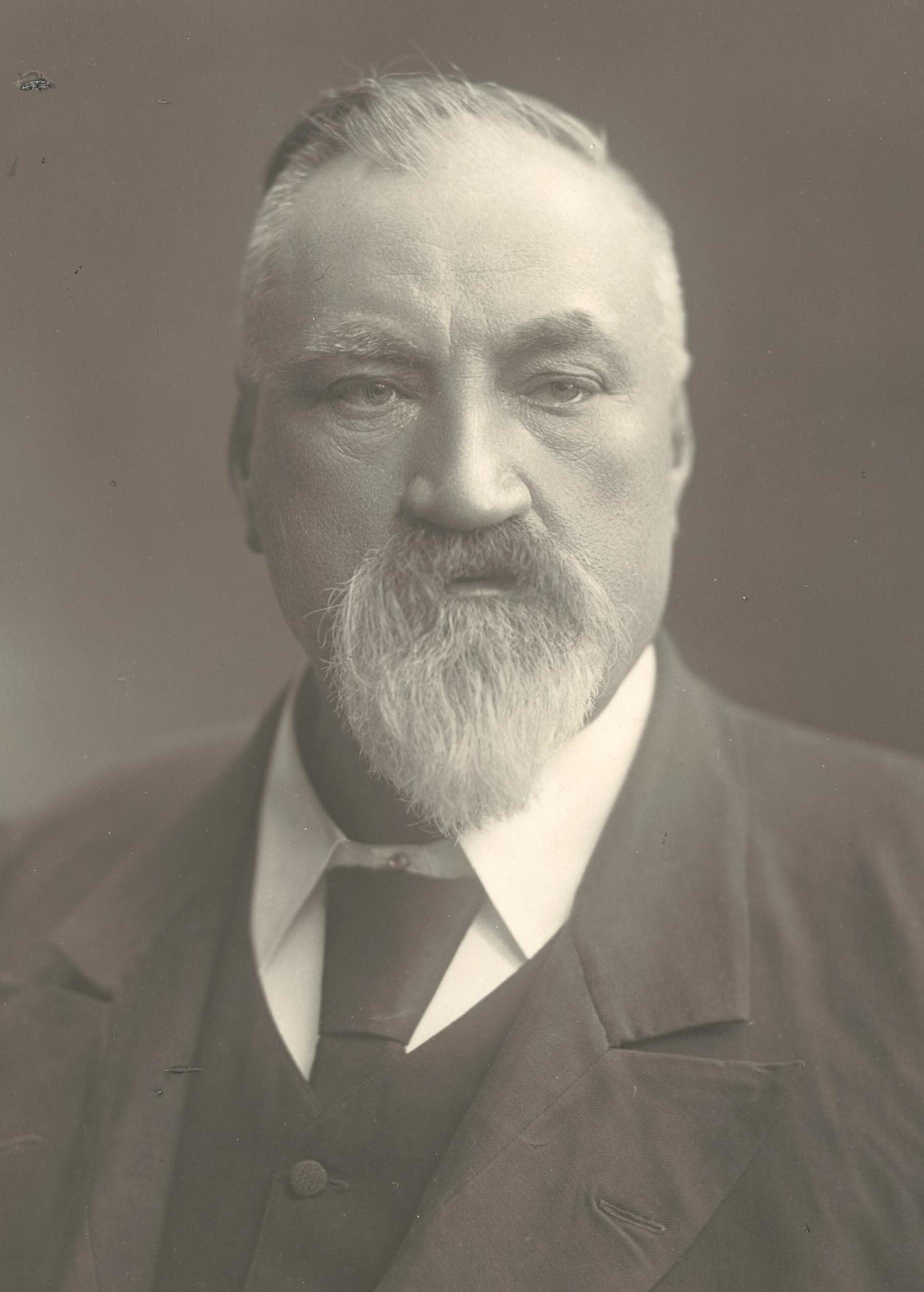
Thomas Playford II (1837–1915)

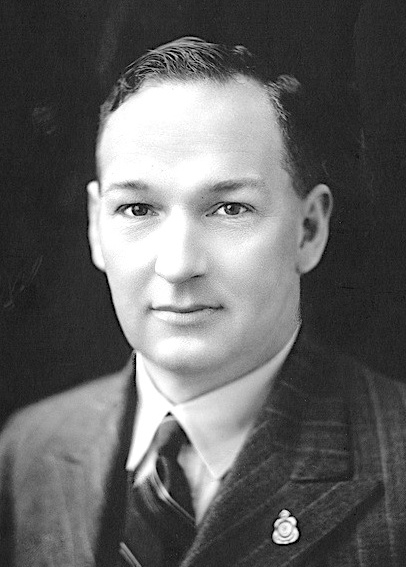
Thomas Playford IV (1895–1981)

=== Page ===
- Sir Earle Page was Prime Minister of Australia in 1939 and a Country Party Member of the House of Representatives from 1919 to 1961. His grandson
  - Donald Page was a member of the NSW Legislative Assembly from 1988 to 2015 and a minister in the NSW Government from 2011 to 2014.

=== Palaszczuk ===
- Henry Palaszczuk (born 1947) – Queensland state member for Archerfield 1984–1992 and Inala 1992–2006, and a Minister in the Beattie Government. Daughter;
- Annastacia Palaszczuk (born 1969) – Queensland state member for Inala (2006–2023) and Premier of Queensland 2015–2023.

=== Palmer ===
- Henry Palmer (1821–1916), Member of the Queensland Legislative Assembly for Maryborough (1880–1883), Mayor of Maryborough (1861, 1865); His brother:
- John Palmer (1825–1870), Mayor of Rockhampton (1861–1862).

=== Parker ===
- Stephen Stanley Parker (1817–1904), Member of the Western Australian Legislative Council (1874–1882); His son:
  - Sir Stephen Henry Parker (1846–1927), Member of the Western Australian Legislative Council (1878–1890, 1892–1897), Member of the Western Australian Legislative Assembly for York (1890–1892), Mayor of Perth (1877–1879, 1881, 1892, 1901), minister in the Forrest government (1892–1894), Chief Justice of Western Australia (1906–1913).

=== Pearsall ===
- Benjamin Pearsall (1878–1951) – Independent member of the Tasmanian House of Assembly for Franklin 1928–1931, 1934–1937
- Benjamin's son, Thomas Pearsall (1920–2003) – Liberal MHA for Franklin 1950–1966, member of the House of Representatives for Franklin 1966–1969
- Thomas' son, Geoff Pearsall (born 1946) – Liberal MHA for Franklin 1969–1988, Deputy Premier of Tasmania 1984–1988

=== Perrett ===
- Trevor Perrett (1941–2022), Citizens Electoral Council/Nationals Member of the Queensland Legislative Assembly for Barambah (1988–1998), minister in the Borbidge Government (1996–1998); His son:
  - Tony Perrett (born 1964), Liberal National Party of Queensland Member of the Queensland Legislative Assembly for Gympie (2015– ), minister in the Crisafulli Government (2024– ).

=== Pickard ===
- Barry Pickard (born 1943), president of Hobart City Heart Business Association (1992–1999), candidate in Hobart Council election (1999); His son:
  - Troy Pickard (1973–2022), Mayor of City of Joondalup (2006–2017), President of WALGA (2010–2015), President of ALGA (2014–2016).

=== Piesse ===
- Frederick Piesse (1853–1912), MLA in Western Australia 1890–1909; brother of Alfred, Arnold, and Charles
- Charles Piesse (1855–1914), MLC in Western Australia 1894–1914; brother of Alfred, Arnold, and Frederick
- Alfred Piesse (1866–1939), MLA in Western Australia 1911–1924; brother of Arnold, Charles, and Frederick
- Arnold Piesse (1872–1935), MLA in Western Australia 1909–1914 and 1930–1935; brother of Alfred, Charles, and Frederick
- Harold Piesse (1884–1944), MLC in Western Australia 1932–1944; son of Frederick
- Edmund Piesse (1900–1952), Senator for Western Australia 1950–1952; son of Arnold
- Winifred Piesse (1923–2017), MLC in Western Australia 1977–1983; daughter-in-law of Charles

=== Pitt ===
- Warren Pitt (born 1948) – state member for Mulgrave 1989–1995 and 1998–2009 and a Minister in the Beattie Government. Son;
- Curtis Pitt (born 1977) – state member for Mulgrave 2009–present and a Minister in the Palaszczuk Government.

=== Playfair ===
- Thomas Playfair (1832–1893), Free Trade Mayor of Sydney (1885), Member of the New South Wales Legislative Assembly for West Sydney (1889–1891); His grandson:
  - Thomas Alfred Playfair (1890–1966), Nationalist/UAP/Liberal Member of the New South Wales Legislative Council (1927–1966).

=== Playford ===
- Thomas Playford Senior non-conformist Baptist minister, teacher and farmer.
- Thomas Playford II (1837–1915) MP for Onkaparinga (S.A); Premier of South Australia 1887–89, 1890–92. (Senator for SA) Federal Minister for Defence 1905–07 and Vice-President of the Executive Council 1903–04.
- Sir Thomas Playford IV Premier of South Australia 1938–65.

=== Plunkett ===
- Thomas Plunkett, Sr (1840–1913), Member of the Queensland Legislative Assembly for Albert (1888–1896, 1899–1908); His son:
  - Tom Plunkett (1878–1957), Country Party Member of the Queensland Legislative Assembly for Albert (1929–1950) and Darlington (1950–1957).

=== Porter ===
- Charles Robert Porter (1910–2004), Liberal Member of the Queensland Legislative Assembly for Toowong (1966–1980); His son:
  - Charles "Chilla" Porter (1936–2020), General secretary of Western Australian Liberal Party (1978–1987); His son:
  - Christian Porter (born 1970), Liberal Member of the Western Australian Legislative Assembly for Bateman (2008–2013); Treasurer (2010–2012), Attorney-General (2008–2012); Member of the Australian House of Representatives for Pearce (2013–2022); Attorney-General of Australia (2017–2021); Minister for Social Services (2015–2017) and Minister for Industry, Science and Technology (2021).

=== Polley ===
- Michael Polley was a member for Wilmot/Lyons from 1972 to 2014 and a Speaker of the Tasmanian House of Assembly. His sister
  - Helen Polley is a Senator for Tasmania from 2005.

=== Pratten ===
- Herbert Pratten (1865–1928), Nationalist Member of the Australian House of Representatives for Parramatta (1921–1922) and Martin (1922–1928), Senator for New South Wales (1917–1921), minister in the Bruce government (1924–1928); His son:
  - Graham Pratten (1899–1977), Nationalist/UAP/Liberal/Country Member of the Australian House of Representatives for Martin (1928–1929), Member of the New South Wales Legislative Council (1937–1976).

=== Price/Hampton ===
- Bess Price (born 1960), member of the Northern Territory Legislative Assembly 2012–2016. Daughter;
  - Jacinta Nampijinpa Price (born 1981), was Deputy Mayor of Alice Springs 2020–2021, senator for the Northern Territory from 2022. A cousin,
  - Karl Hampton (born 1968), member of the Northern Territory Legislative Assembly 2006–2012.

=== Prowse/Herbert/Chance ===
- John Prowse (1871–1944), Country Member of the Australian House of Representatives for Swan (1919–1922) and Forrest (1922–1943); His nephew:
  - Edgar Prowse (1905–1977), Country Senator for Western Australia (1962–1973); His nephews:
    - John Herbert (1925–1978), Liberal Member of the Queensland Legislative Assembly for Sherwood (1956–1978), minister in the Bjelke-Petersen Government (1965–1978).
    - Kim Chance (1946–2017), Labor Member of the Western Australian Legislative Council (1992–2009), state government minister (2001–2008).

=== Purich/Purick ===
- Noel Padgham-Purich was a member of the Northern Territory Legislative Assembly for Tiwi 1977–1983; Koolpinyah 1983–1990; and Nelson 1990–1997. Her daughter,
  - Kezia Purick, has been member for Goyder since 2008.

== R ==
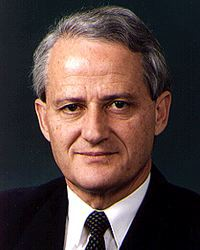
Philip Ruddock (born 1943)

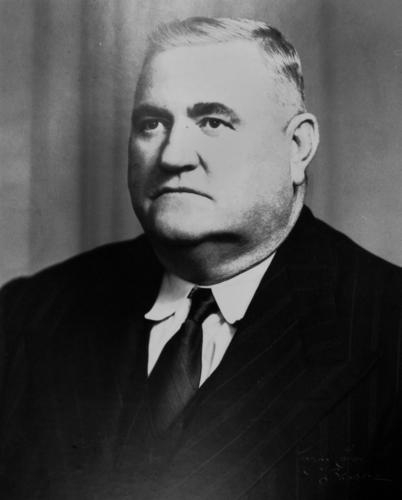
Ernest Riordan (1901–1954)

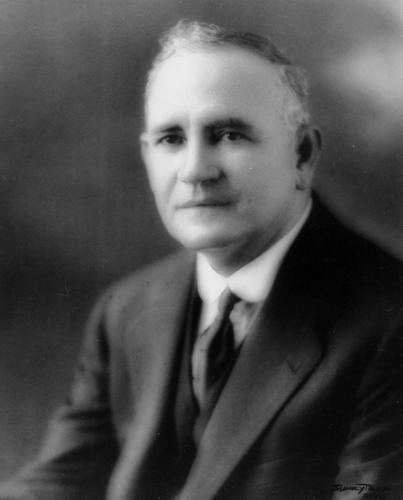
Jim Riordan (1882–1955)

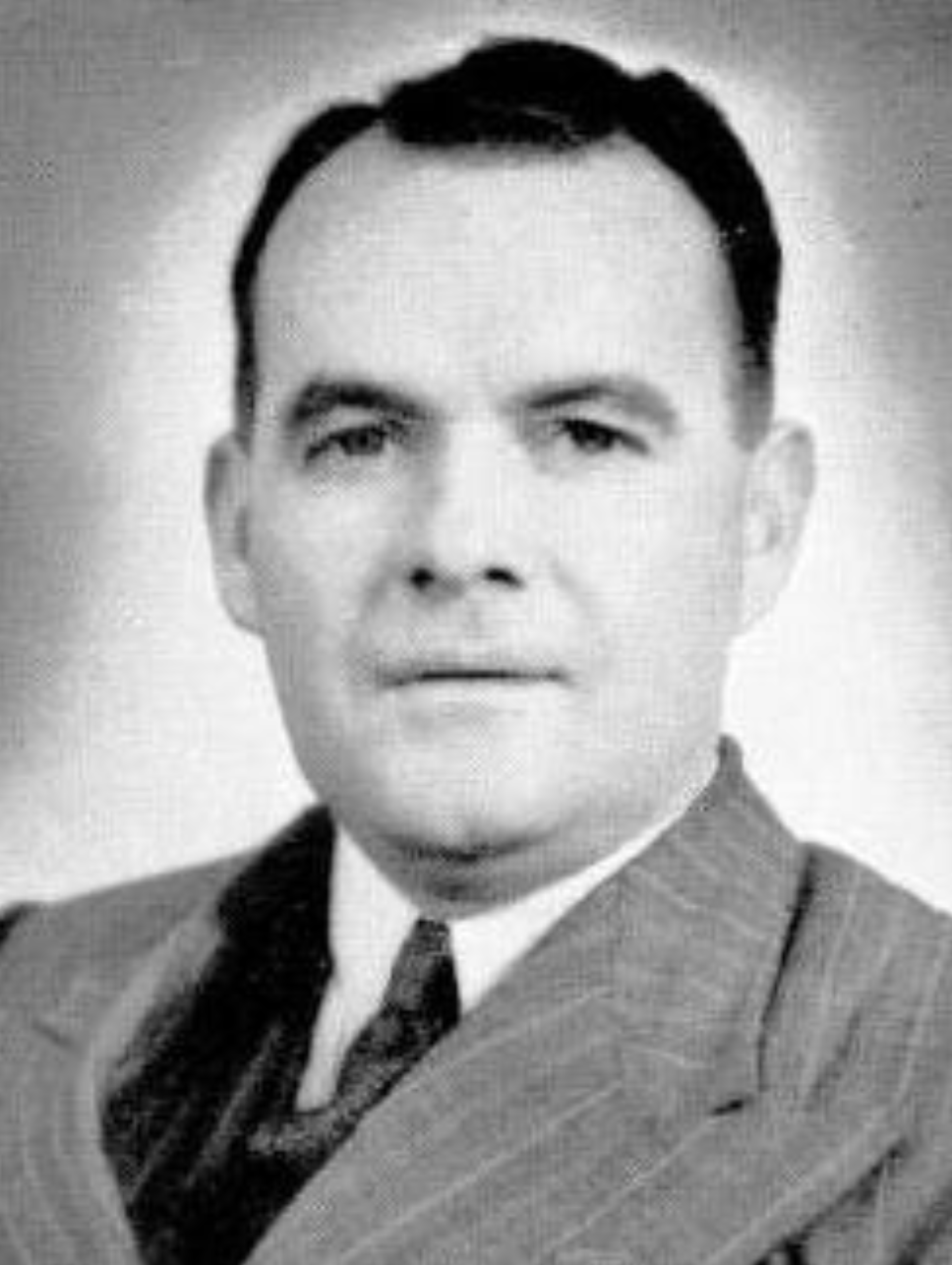
Bill Riordan (1908–1973)

=== Rankin ===
- Colin Rankin (1869–1940), Liberal Member of the Queensland Legislative Assembly for Burrum (1905–1918); His daughter:
  - Dame Annabelle Rankin (1908–1986), Liberal Senator for Queensland (1947–1971), High Commissioner of Australia to New Zealand (1971–1974), minister in the Holt, McEwen, Gorton and McMahon governments (1966–1971).

=== Rattray ===
- Colin Rattray (1931–2009), Independent Member of the Tasmanian Legislative Council for South Esk (1992–1999) and Member of the Tasmanian Legislative Council for Apsley (1999–2004); His daughter:
  - Tania Rattray (born 1958), Independent Member of the Tasmanian Legislative Council for Apsley (2004–2017) and Member of the Tasmanian Legislative Council for McIntyre (2017– ).

=== Reynolds ===
- Margaret Reynolds (born 1941), Labor Senator for Queensland (1983–1999), minister in the Hawke government (1987–1990); Her daughter:
  - Anna Reynolds (born 1968), Greens/Independent Lord Mayor of Hobart (2018– ).

=== Riley ===
- Edward Riley (1859–1943), Labor Member of the Australian House of Representatives for South Sydney (1910–1931); His son:
  - Edward Charles Riley (1892–1969), Australian House of Representatives for the Cook (1922–1934).

=== Riordan ===
- Darby Riordan (1886–1936), Labor Member of the Australian House of Representatives for Kennedy (1929–1936), Member of the Queensland Legislative Assembly for Burke (1918–1929); His brothers:
- Ernest Riordan (1901–1953), Labor Member of the Queensland Legislative Assembly for Bowen (1936–1944) and Flinders (1950–1954); And:
- Jim Riordan (1882–1955), Labor Member of the Queensland Legislative Council (1917–1922); His son:
  - Bill Riordan (1908–1973), Labor Member of the Australian House of Representatives for Kennedy (1936–1966), minister in the Chifley government (1946–1949).
- Joe Riordan (1930–2012), Labor Member of the Australian House of Representatives for Phillip (1972–1975), Minister for Housing and Construction (1975); nephew of Darby Riordan

=== Row ===
- Sir John Row (1905–1993), Country Member of the Queensland Legislative Assembly for Hinchinbrook (1960–1972), minister in the Pizzey and Bjelke-Petersen governments (1963–1972); His nephew:
  - Ted Row (1923–2007), Country/National Member of the Queensland Legislative Assembly for Hinchinbrook (1972–1989).

=== Ruddock ===
- Max Ruddock was Member of the New South Wales state parliament from 1962 to 1976 and a minister in the NSW Government. His son:
  - Philip Ruddock was MP for Parramatta from 1973 until 1977, for Dundas from 1977 until 1993 and for Berowra from 1993 until 2016, was Immigration Minister 1996–2003 and Attorney-General 2003–2007 in the Howard government and was Father of the Australian Parliament from 1998 until 2016.

=== Rusden ===
- Francis Rusden (1811–1887), Member of the New South Wales Legislative Assembly for Liverpool Plains and Gwydir (1856–1857) and Gwydir (1860–1864); His brother:
- Thomas Rusden (1917–1882), Member of the New South Wales Legislative Council for Pastoral Districts of New England and Macleay (1855–1856), Member of the New South Wales Legislative Assembly for New England and Macleay (1856–1857).

=== Russell ===
- Wilfred Adams Russell (1874–1932), Country Member of the Queensland Legislative Assembly for Dalby (1926–1932); His son:
  - Charles Russell (1907–1977), Country/Independent Member of the Australian House of Representatives for Maranoa (1949–1951), Member of the Queensland Legislative Assembly for Dalby (1947–1949); His sons:
    - David Russell (born 1950), President of the Queensland National Party (1995–1999), Vice-President of the National Party of Australia (1990–1995, 1999–2005), President of the National Party of Australia (2005–2006), Vice-President of the Liberal Party of Australia (2009–2011); His cousin:
    - Russell Cooper (born 1941), National Premier of Queensland (1989), Member of the Queensland Legislative Assembly for Roma (1983–1992) and Crows Nest (1992–2001), minister in the Ahearn (1987–1989) and Borbidge (1996–1998) governments.

== S ==
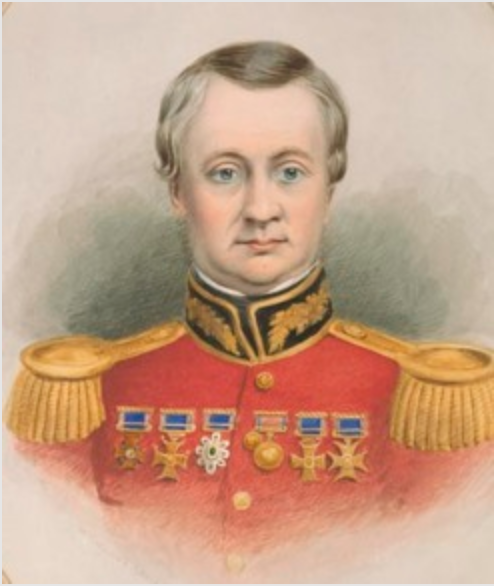
Kenneth Snodgrass (1784–1853)

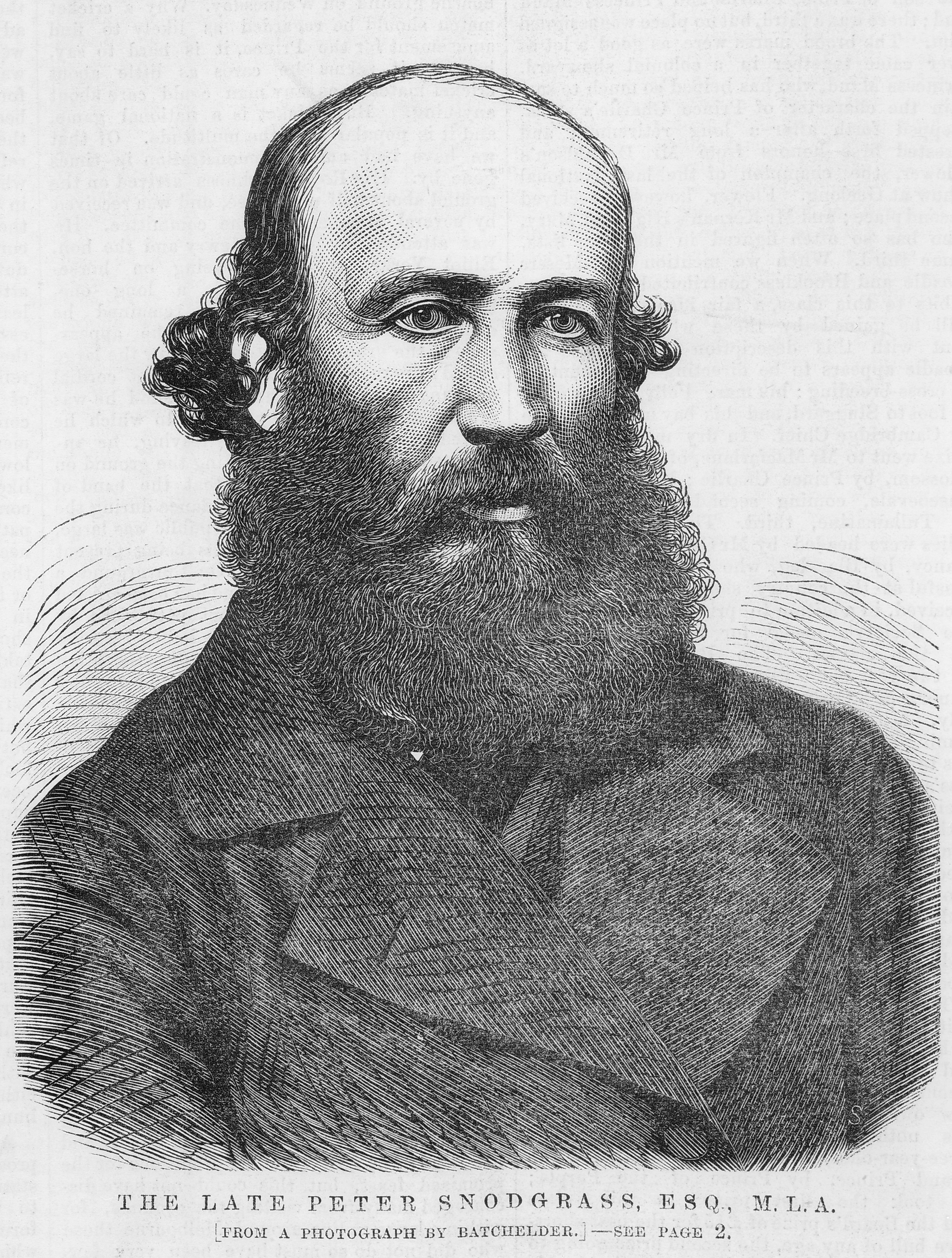
Peter Snodgrass (1817–1867)

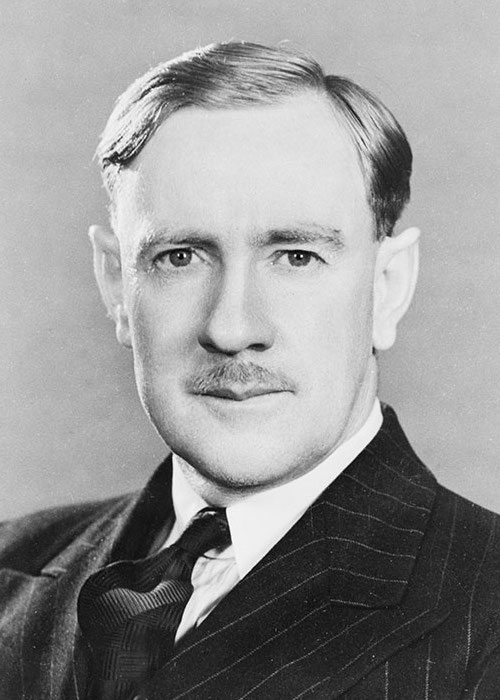
Percy Spender (1897–1985)

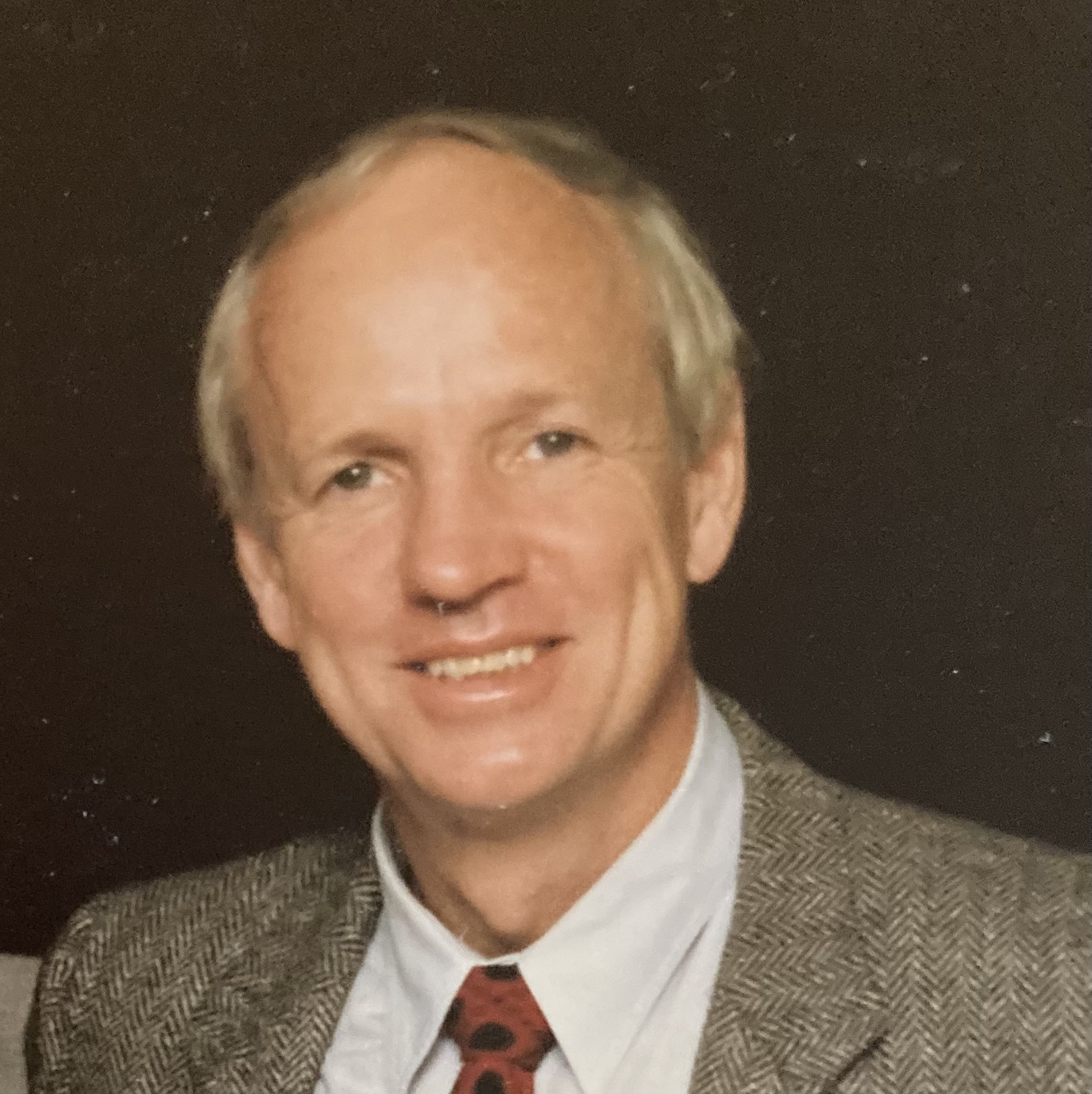
John Spender (1935–2022)

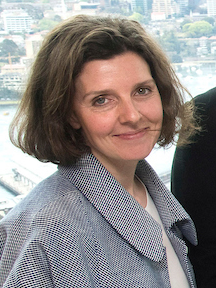
Allegra Spender (born 1978)

=== Sargood ===
- Frederick James Sargood (1805–1873), Member of the Victorian Legislative Council for City of Melbourne (1853–1856), Member of the Victorian Legislative Assembly for St Kilda (1856–1857); His son:
  - Sir Frederick Thomas Sargood (1834–1903), Free Trade Senator for Victoria (1901–1903), Member of the Victorian Legislative Council for Central Province (1874–1880) and South Yarra (1882–1901), minister in the Service (1883–1886) and Turner (1894) governments.

=== Shakespeare ===
- Thomas Shakespeare (1873–1938), Labor/Nationalist Member of the New South Wales Legislative Council (1923–1934), Member of the Australian Capital Territory Advisory Council (1930–1938); His son:
  - Arthur Shakespeare (1897–1975), Member of the Australian Capital Territory Advisory Council (1945–1955).

=== Shannon ===
- James Shannon (1840–1891), Member of the South Australian House of Assembly for Electoral district of Light (1878–1881); His half-brother:
- David Shannon (1822–1875), South Australian House of Assembly for Electoral district of Light (1858–1860); His nephew:
  - John Shannon (1862–1926), Liberal/Nationalist Senator for South Australia (1912–1913, 1914–1920), Member of the South Australian House of Assembly for Yorke Peninsula (1896–1902) and Wallaroo (1902–1905); His son:
    - Howard Shannon (1892–1976), Member of the South Australian House of Assembly for Murray (1933–1938) and onkaparinga (1938–1968).

=== Shenton ===
- George Shenton Sr. (1811–1867), Mayor of Perth (1854–1856, 1857–1858); His son:
  - Sir George Shenton (1842–1909), President of the Western Australian Legislative Council (1892–1906), Member of the Western Australian Legislative Council for Greenough (1870–1873) and Metropolitan Province (1894–1906), Mayor of Perth (1876–1877, 1880, 1882–1884, 1886–1888), Mayor of Stirling (1881–1882).

=== Smith (Victoria) ===
- Joseph Smith (1904–1993), Labor Member of the Victorian Legislative Assembly for Goulburn (1944-1947, 1950-1955); His brother:
- Arthur Smith (1902–1981), Labor Member of the Victorian Legislative Council for Bendigo (1952–1964).

=== Snodgrass ===
- Kenneth Snodgrass (1784–1853), Member of the New South Wales Legislative Council for Counties of Gloucester, Macquarie, and Stanley (1833–1838, 1848–1850); His son:
  - Peter Snodgrass (1817–1867), Member of the Victorian Legislative Council for Kilmore, Kyneton and Seymour (1851–1856), Member of the Victorian Legislative Assembly for Dalhousie (1856–1864).

=== Solomon ===
- Emanuel Solomon (1800–1873), Member of the South Australian House of Assembly for West Adelaide (1862–1865), Member of the South Australian Legislative Council (1867–1871); His nephews:
  - Elias Solomon (1839–1909), Free Trade Member of the Australian House of Representatives for Fremantle (1901–1903), Member of the Western Australian Legislative Assembly for South Fremantle (1892–1901), Mayor of Fremantle (1881); And:
  - Judah Moss Solomon (1818–1880), Mayor of Adelaide (1869–1871), Member of the South Australian House of Assembly for City of Adelaide (1858–1860) and West Adelaide (1871–1875), Member of the South Australian Legislative Council (1861–1866); His son:
    - Vaiben Louis Solomon (1853–1908), Free Trade/National League Premier of South Australia (1899), Member of the Australian House of Representatives for South Australia (1901–1903), Member of the South Australian House of Assembly for Northern Territory (1890–1901, 1905–1908); His daughter:
      - Esther Solomon (1900–1991), Adelaide City Councillor (1956–1978).

=== Spender ===
- Sir Percy Spender, KCVO KBE QC: Member of parliament for Warringah (1937–1951) where he held a number of ministries including treasurer, ambassador to the United States (1951–1957) and judge on the International Court of Justice (1958–1967) including as president (1964–1967)
- John Spender QC: Member of parliament for North Sydney (1980–1990), and ambassadors to France (1996–2000), son of Percy
- Allegra Spender: Independent Member for Wentworth elected at the 2022 federal election, daughter of John

=== Stephen ===
- John Stephen (1771–1833), Solicitor General for New South Wales (1824–1825); His nephew:
  - Sir Alfred Stephen (1802–1894), Solicitor-General of Tasmania (1825–1833), Attorney-General of Tasmania (1833–1837), Chief Justice of New South Wales (1844–1873), President of the New South Wales Legislative Council (1856–1857), Member of the New South Wales Legislative Council (1856–1858), Lieutenant-Governor of New South Wales (1872–1891); His sons:
    - Montagu Stephen (1827–1872), Member of the New South Wales Legislative Assembly for Canterbury (1869–1870); And:
    - Henry Stephen (1828–1920), Member of the New South Wales Legislative Assembly for Mudgee (1869–1871); And:
    - Septimus Stephen (1842–1901), Member of the New South Wales Legislative Assembly for Canterbury (1882–1887), Member of the New South Wales Legislative Council (1887–1900); Their cousin:
    - James Stephen (1822–1881), Member of the Victorian Legislative Assembly for St Kilda (1870–1874), Attorney-General of Victoria (1872–1874), minister in the Francis government (1872–1874).

=== Stephens ===
- Thomas Blacket Stephens (1819–1877), Member of the Queensland Legislative Assembly for South Brisbane (1863–1875), Member of the Queensland Legislative Council (1876-1877), Mayor of Brisbane (1862), minister in the Mackenzie and Lilley governments (1867-1870); His son:
  - William Stephens (1857–1925), Member of the Queensland Legislative Assembly for South Brisbane (1896–1904, 1907–1908) and Woolloongabba (1888–1896), Member of the Queensland Legislative Council (1912–1922), Mayor of South Brisbane (1888–1890, 1891–1902).

=== Strangways ===
- Thomas Bewes Strangways (1809–1859), Colonial Secretary of South Australia (1837–1838), Member of the South Australian Legislative Council (1837–1838); His nephew:
  - Henry Strangways (1832–1920), Premier of South Australia (1868–1870), Member of the South Australian House of Assembly for Encounter Bay (1858–1862) and West Torrens (1862–1871), minister in the Reynolds, Waterhouse, Dutton and Ayers governments (1860–1865).

=== Street ===
- John Rendell Street, MLC (b.1832–d.1891): Founder of the Australian Street dynasty; successor of Sir Edmund Barton, 1st Prime Minister of Australia, in his New South Wales Legislative Assembly seat of East Sydney (1887–death); descendant of Baron Sir Thomas Street.
- Sir Philip Whistler Street, KCMG, KC (b.1863–d.1938): 8th Chief Justice of the Supreme Court of New South Wales and Lieutenant-Governor of New South Wales (1925–1938); second longest serving judge in New South Wales history; son of John Rendell, father of Sir Kenneth.
- Lieutenant Colonel Sir Kenneth Whistler Street, KCMG, KStJ, QC (b.1890–d.1972): 10th Chief Justice of the Supreme Court of New South Wales and Lieutenant-Governor of New South Wales (1950–1972); son of Sir Philip, husband of "Red Jessie", father of Sir Laurence.
- Jessie Mary Grey, Lady Street (b.1889–d.1970): Prominent diplomat and suffragette; Australia's first female delegate to the United Nations; instrumental in the gender non-discrimination clause of the UN Charter; organised the formation of the Aboriginal Rights Organisation.
- Brigadier Geoffrey Austin Street, MP, MC (b.1894–d.1940): Australia's Minister of Defence in the First Menzies Government during World War II; awarded Military Cross for bravery in the Battle of Gallipoli; died as Minister of Defence in the Canberra Air Disaster of World War II; father of Anthony Austin.
- Commander Sir Laurence Whistler Street, AC, KCMG, KStJ, QC (1926–2018): 14th and second youngest Chief Justice of the Supreme Court of New South Wales and Lieutenant-Governor of New South Wales (1974–1989); son of Sir Kenneth and "Red Jessie", father of Alexander.
- Anthony Austin Street, MP, (1926–2022): Australia's Foreign Minister in the Fourth Fraser Ministry (1980–1983); Minister for Employment and Industrial Relations and Minister for Industrial Relations in the Third Fraser Ministry; son of Geoffrey Austin (held the same seat, Corangamite).
- Commander Alexander Whistler Street, SC (b.1959–): Incumbent judge of the Federal Circuit Court of Australia and Commander of the Royal Australian Naval Reserve, along with his sister Justice Sylvia Emmett (née Street), a federal judge and Lieutenant Commander in the naval reserve, and wife to federal judge Arthur Emmett.

=== Sullivan ===
- Terry Sullivan (1949– ), Member of the Queensland Legislative Assembly for Nundah (1991–1992), Chermside (1992–2001) and Stafford (2001–2006).
- his son, Jimmy Sullivan (1982–2026), Member of the Queensland Legislative Assembly for Stafford (2020–2026)

=== Suttor ===
- William Henry Suttor (1805–1877), Member of the New South Wales Legislative Council for Counties of Roxburgh, Phillip and Wellington (1843–1854), Member of the New South Wales Legislative Assembly for County of Bathurst (1856–1859), East Macquarie (1859, 1860–1864) and Bathurst (1866–1872); His sons:
  - William Suttor Jr. (1834–1905), Member of the New South Wales Legislative Assembly for East Macquarie (1875–1879), Member of the New South Wales Legislative Council (1880–1900); and:
  - Francis Bathurst Suttor (1839–1915), Free Trade/Protectionist Member of the New South Wales Legislative Assembly for Bathurst (1877–1887, 1891–1894, 1898–1900), Member of the New South Wales Legislative Council (1889–1891, 1900–1903–1914), President of the New South Wales Legislative Council (1903–1914), minister in the Parkes, John Robertson, Jennings and Dibbs governments.

== T ==
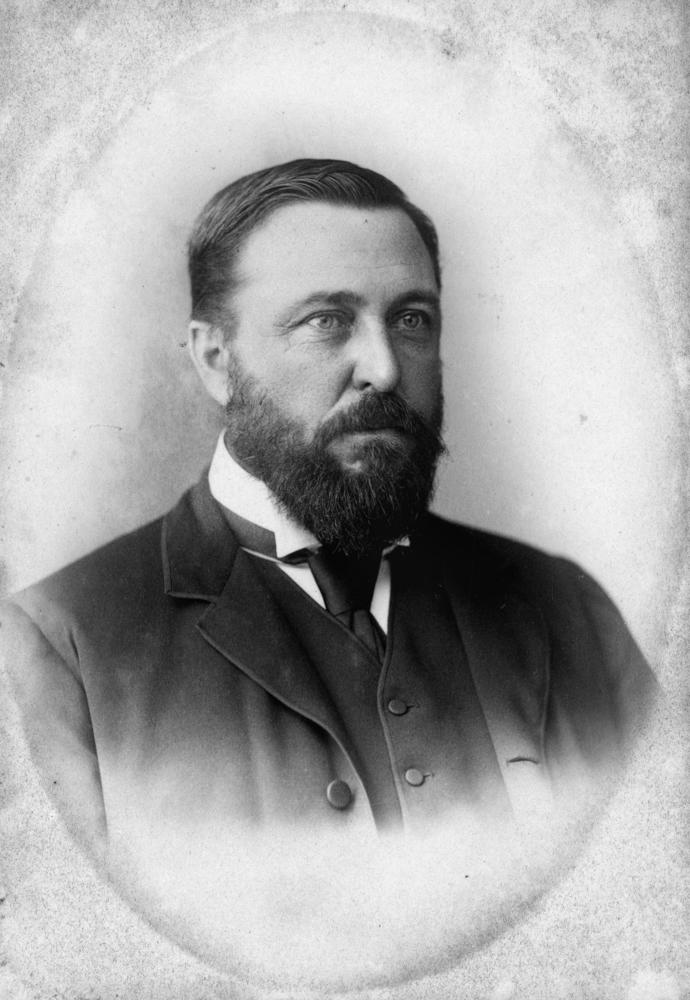
Sir Horace Tozer (1844–1916)

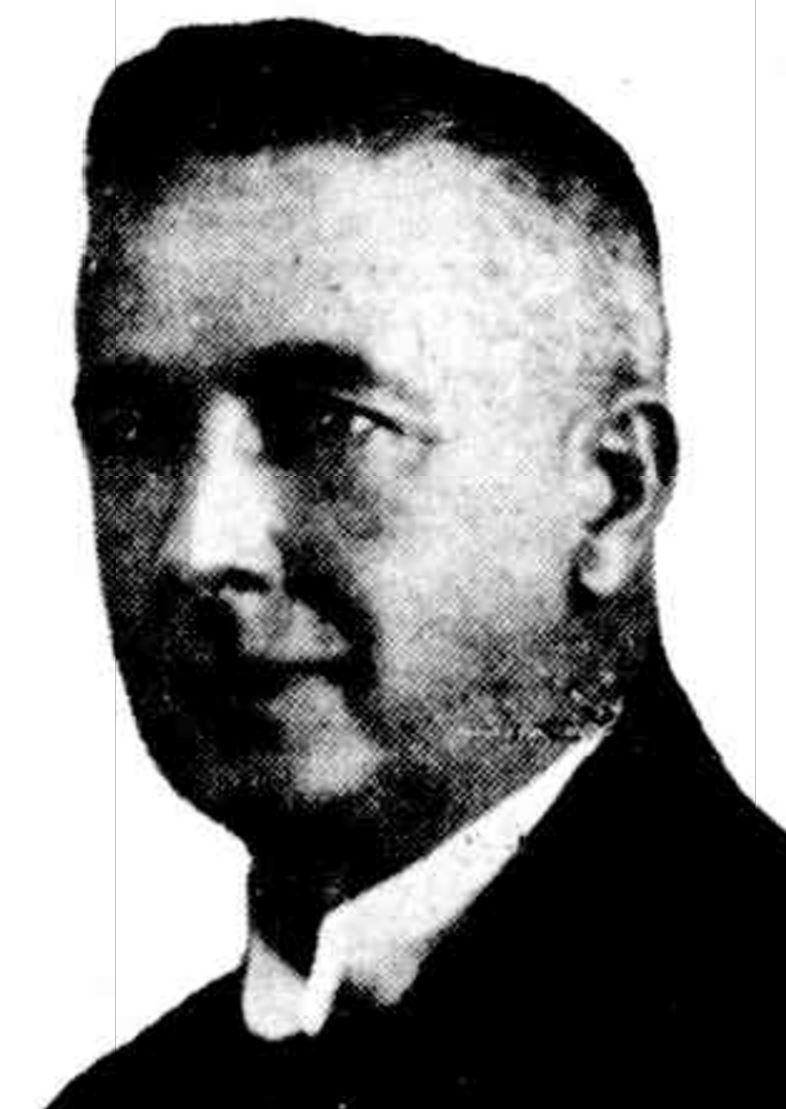
Vivian Tozer (1870–1954)

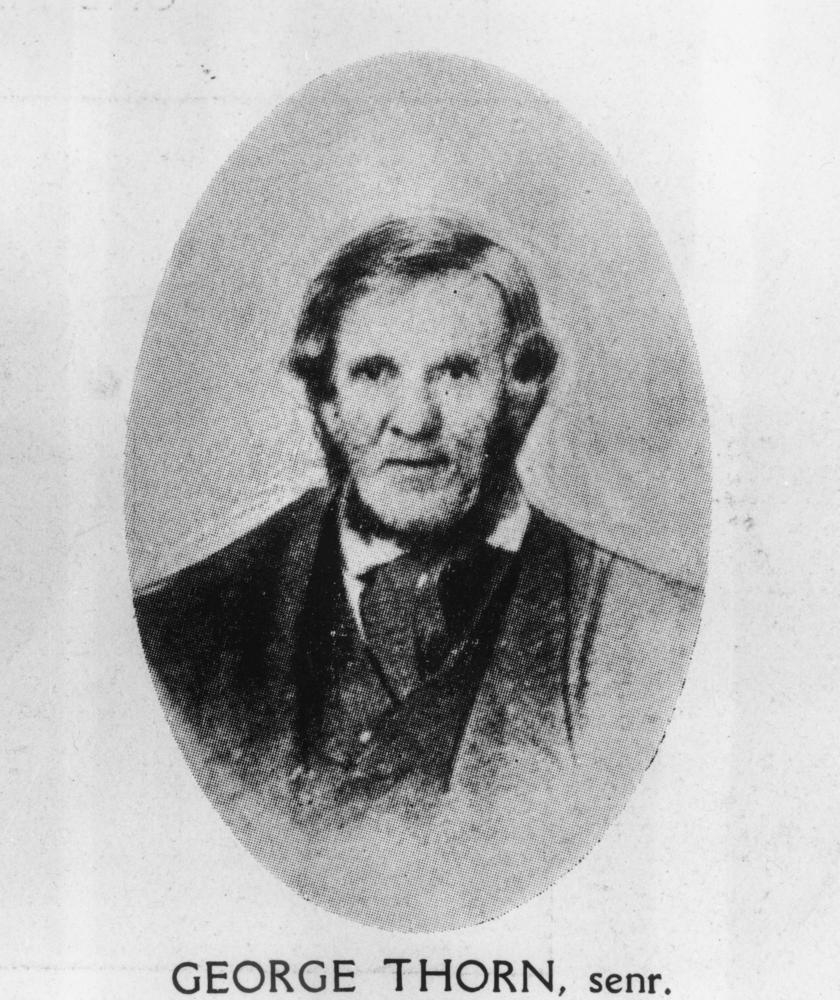
George Thorn Sr. (1806–1876)

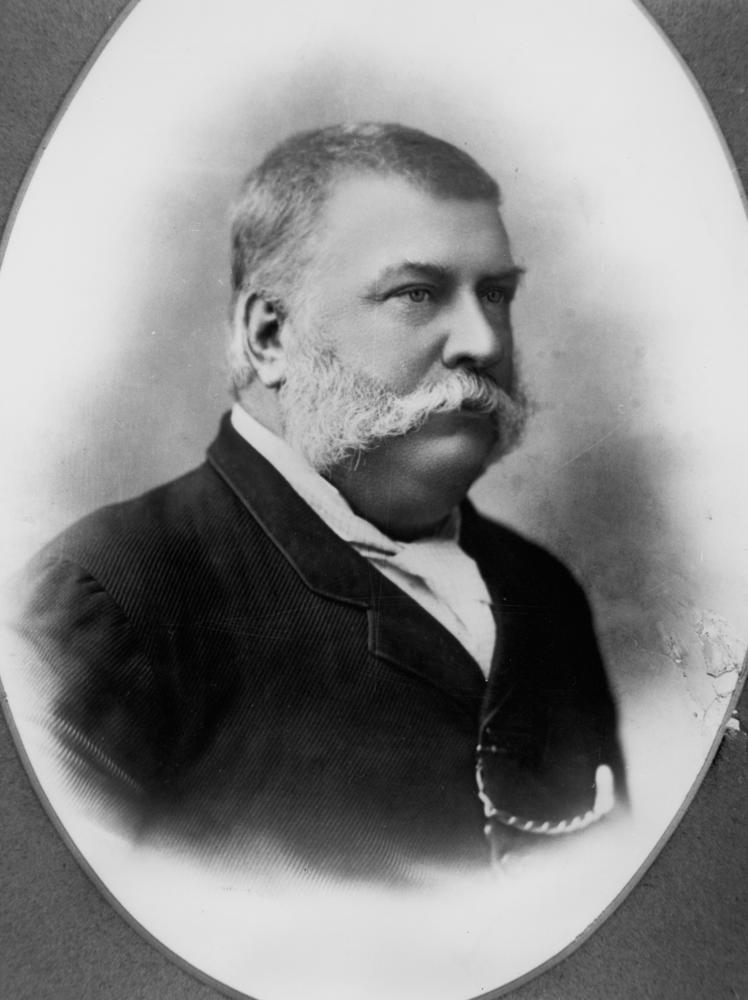
George Thorn (1838–1905)

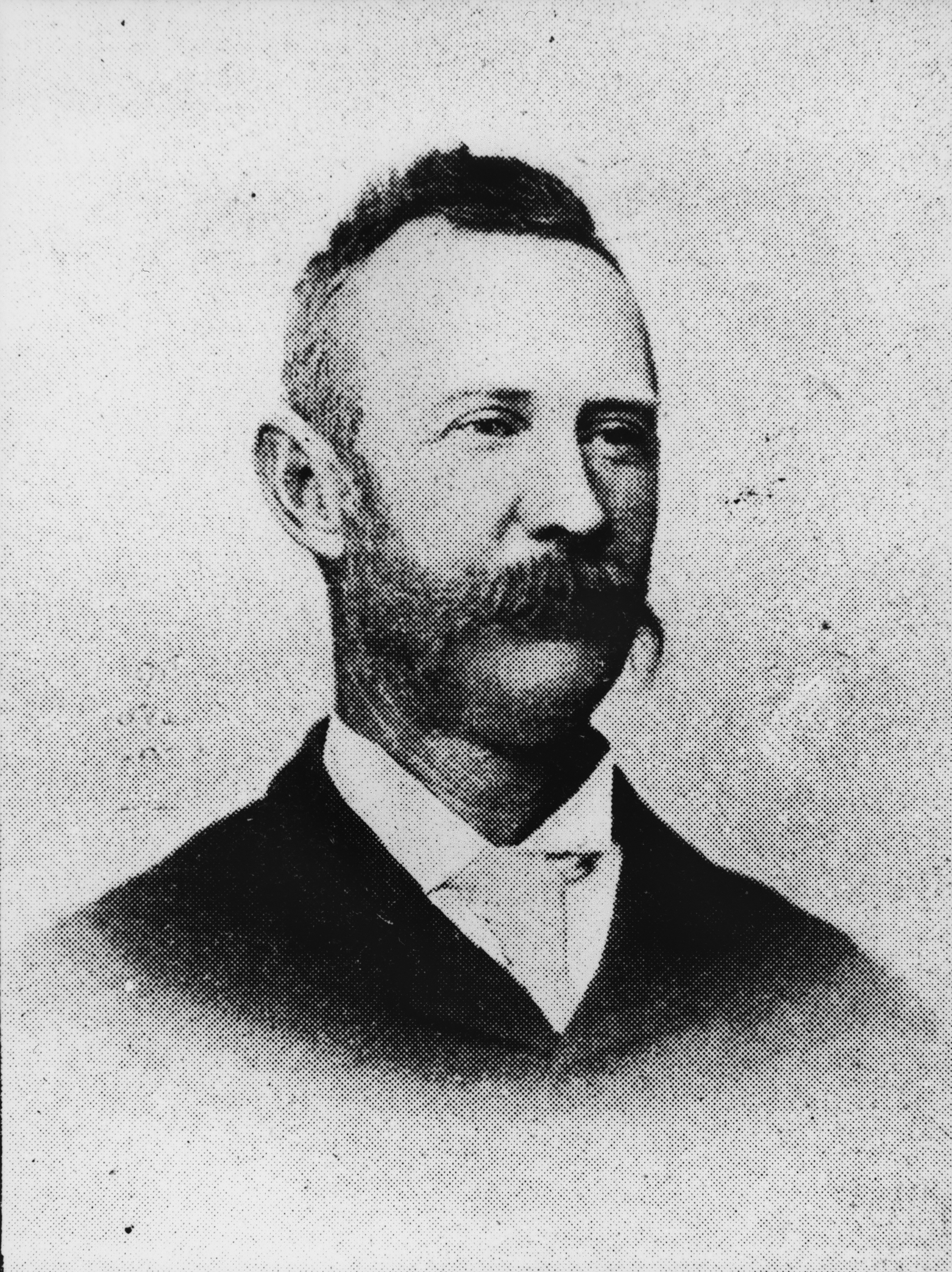
William Thorn (1852–1935)

=== Tanner ===
- Edgar Tanner (1904–1979), Liberal Member of the Victorian Legislative Assembly for Ripponlea (1955–1967) and Caulfield (1967–1976); His son:
- Ted Tanner (born 1947), Liberal Member of the Victorian Legislative Assembly for Caulfield (1979–1996).

=== Teague ===
- Baden Teague (born 1944), Liberal Senator for South Australia (1978–1996); His son:
  - Josh Teague (born 1975), Liberal Member of the South Australian House of Assembly for Heysen (2018– ), Speaker of the South Australian House of Assembly (2020–2021), minister in the Marshall government (2021–2022).

=== Tehan ===
- Marie Tehan was a Liberal member of the Victorian Legislative Council from 1987 to 1992 and of the Victorian Legislative Assembly from 1992 to 1999. She was a minister in the Victorian Government. Her son
  - Dan Tehan has been a Liberal member of the Australian House of Representatives since 2010.

=== Theodore ===
- Stephen Theodore (1883–1950), Labor Member of the Queensland Legislative Assembly for Herbert (1940–1950); His brother:
- Ted Theodore (1884–1950), Labor Premier of Queensland (1919–1925), Member of the Australian House of Representatives for Dalley (1927–1931), Member of the Queensland Legislative Assembly for Woothakata (1912–1925) and Chillagoe (1909–1912), minister in the Ryan government (1915–1919), minister in the Scullin government (1929–1932).

=== Theophanous ===
- Andrew Theophanous (born 1946), Labor Member of the Australian House of Representatives for Calwell (1984–2001) and Burke (1980–1984); His Brother:
- Theo Theophanous (born 1948), Labor Member of the Victorian Legislative Council for Jika Jika (1988–2002) and Northern Metropolitan (2002–2008), minister in the Kirner (1991–1992), Bracks (2002–2007) and Brumby (2007–2008) governments; His daughter:
  - Kat Theophanous (born 1986), Labor Member of the Victorian Legislative Assembly for Northcote (2018– ).

=== Thompson ===
- Lindsay Thompson was a Liberal Party member of the Victorian Legislative Council from 1955 to 1970 and of the Victorian Legislative Assembly from 1970 to 1982. He was the 40th Premier of Victoria. His son
  - Murray Thompson was a Liberal Party member of the Victorian Legislative Assembly from 1992 to 2018.

=== Thorn/Harris/Hill/Casey ===
- George Thorn (senior) (1806—1876), Member of the Queensland Legislative Assembly for West Moreton (1860—1861)
- his sons:
  - George Thorn (1838—1905), Premier of Queensland (1876—1877)
  - John Thorn (1847—1896), Member of the Queensland Legislative Assembly for Fassifern (1874—1878)
  - Henry Thorn (1840—1880), Member of the Queensland Legislative Assembly for Northern Downs (1867—1868, 1873—1876)
  - William Thorn, Member of the Queensland Legislative Assembly for Aubigny (1894—1904, 1908—1912)
- his son-in-law George Harris, Member of the Queensland Legislative Council
  - George Harris's sons-in-law
    - Charles Lumley Hill, Member of the Queensland Legislative Assembly for Gregory and Cook.
    - Richard Gardiner Casey, Member of the Queensland Legislative Assembly for Warrego
      - Richard Casey's son Baron Casey, Governor-General of Australia

=== Toohey ===
- John Toohey (1839–1903), Member of the New South Wales Legislative Council (1892–1903); His brother:
- James Toohey (1850–1895), Member of the New South Wales Legislative Assembly for South Sydney (1885–1893).

=== Townley ===
- Athol Townley (1905–1963), Liberal Member of the Australian House of Representatives for Denison (1949–1963), minister in the Menzies government (1951–1963); His brother:
- Rex Townley (1904–1982), Independent/Liberal Member of the Tasmanian House of Assembly for Denison (1946–1965); His son
  - Michael Townley (born 1934), Independent/Liberal Senator for Tasmania (1971–1987),

=== Tozer ===
- Horace Tozer (1844–1916), Ministerialist Member of the Queensland Legislative Assembly for Wide Bay (1871, 1888–1898); His son:
  - Vivian Tozer (1870–1954), Country and Progressive National Member of the Queensland Legislative Assembly for Gympie (1929–1935).

=== Turnbull ===
- Campbell Turnbull (1898–1977), Labor Member of the Victorian Legislative Assembly for Brunswick West (1955–1973); His cousin:
- Keith Turnbull (1907–1978), Liberal Member of the Victorian Legislative Assembly for Korong (1950–1955) and Kara Kara (1955–1964), minister in the Bolte government (1955–1964).

== V ==
=== Vale ===
- William and Richard Vale were brothers who both represented West Ballarat in the Victorian Legislative Assembly during the latter part of the 19th century. William's great-grandson,
  - Monte Vale, was member of the Assembly for Greensborough (1967–70, 1973–77), while Monte's son
    - Roger Vale was member of the Northern Territory Legislative Assembly for Electoral division of Stuart, 1974–1994.

=== Valentine ===
- Francis Valentine (1863–1941), Liberal Member of the Tasmanian House of Assembly for Denison (1912–1913), Mayor of Hobart (1925–1926); His great-grandson:
  - Rob Valentine (born 1950), Independent Lord Mayor of Hobart (1999–2011), Member of the Tasmanian Legislative Council for Hobart (2012–2024).

=== Vardon ===
- Joseph Vardon (1843–1913), Liberal Senator for South Australia (1907, 1908–1913); His son:
  - Edward Vardon (1866–1937), Liberal/Nationalist Senator for South Australia (1921, 1921–1922), Member of the South Australian House of Assembly for Sturt (1918–1921, 1924–1930).

=== Venning ===
- Howard Venning (1915–1995); His son:
  - Ivan Venning (born 1945), His nephew:
    - Tom Venning (born 1994),

=== Veryard ===
- John Veryard (1851–1924), Liberal/Nationalist Member of the Western Australian Legislative Assembly for Balcatta (1905–1908) and Leederville (1914–1921); His grandson:
  - Charles Veryard (1900–1967), Lord Mayor of Perth (1964–1967).

== W ==
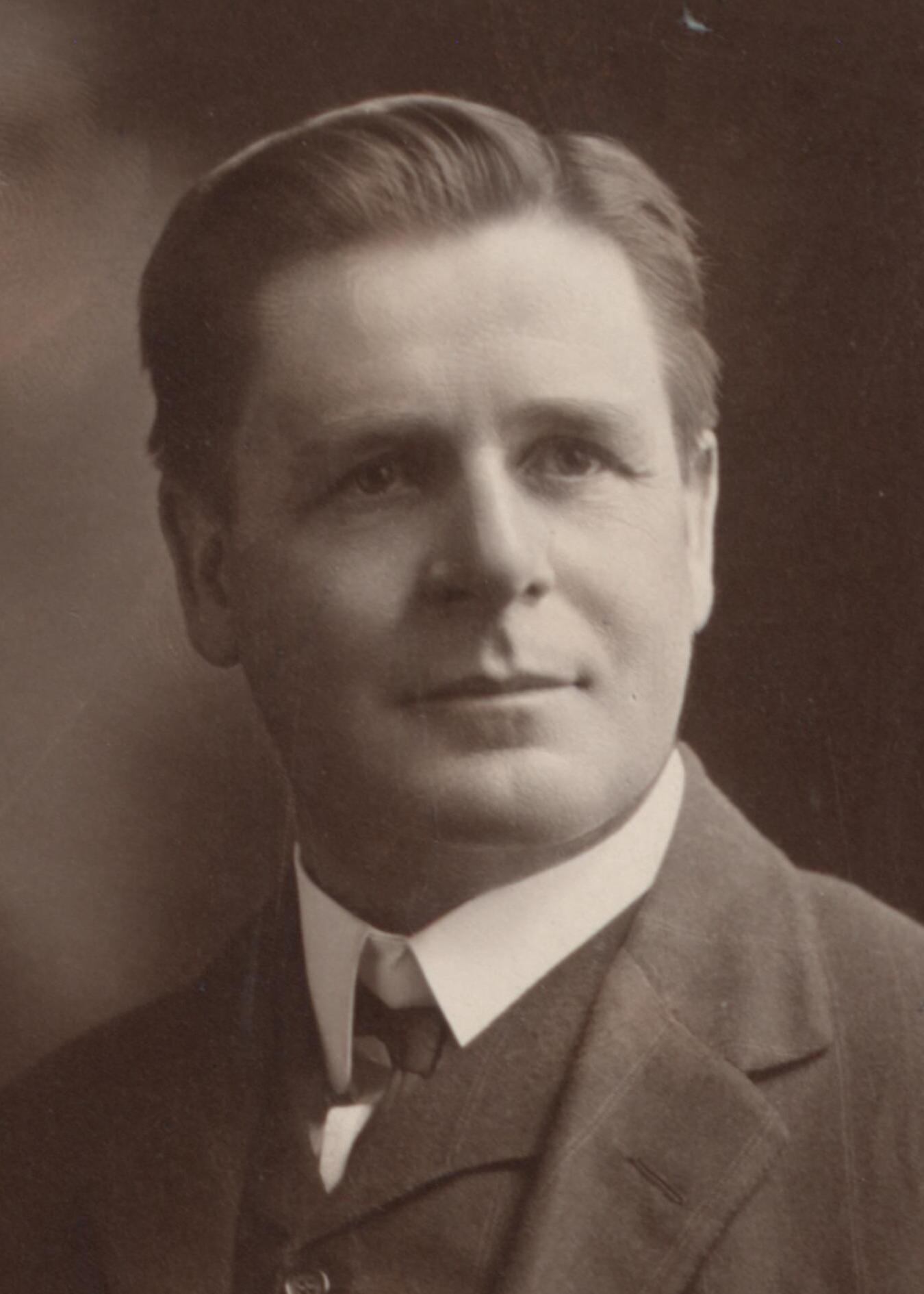
David Watkins (1865–1935)

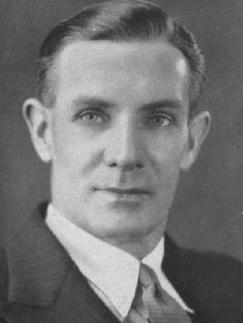
David O. Watkins (1896–1971)

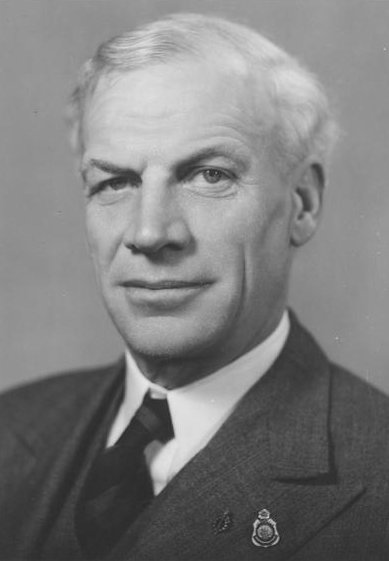
Keith Wilson (1900–1987)

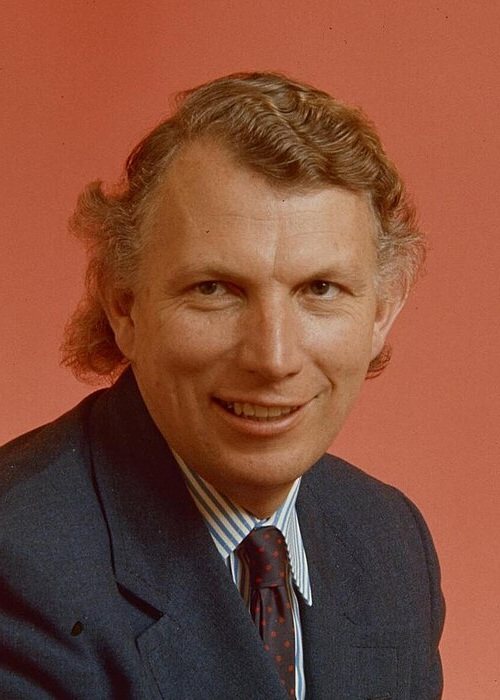
Ian Wilson (1932–2013)

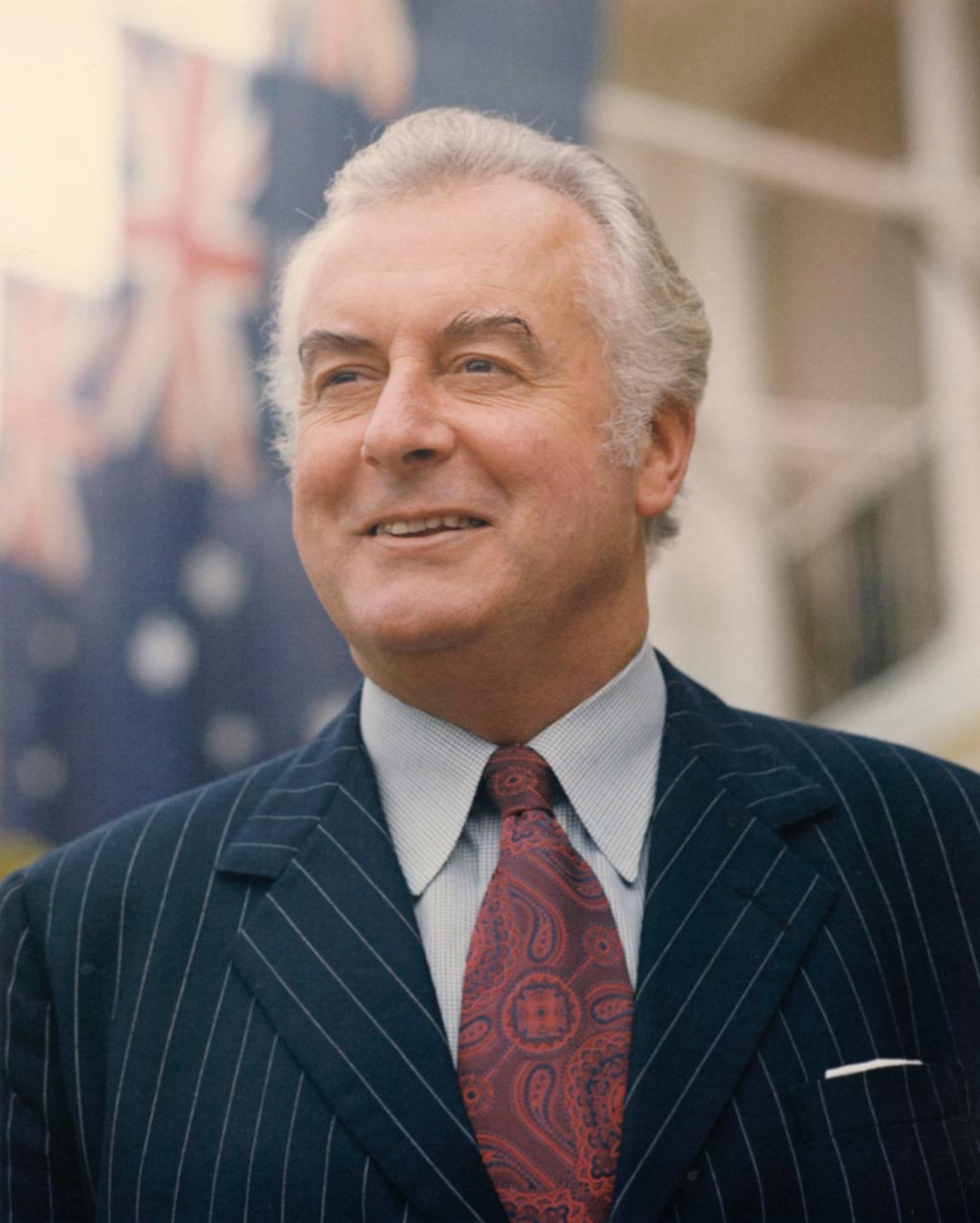
Gough Whitlam (1916–2014)

=== Walker ===
- James Thomas Walker (1841–1923), original senator from New South Wales (1901–1913);
- his older cousin was Thomas Walker (1804–1886), member of NSW Legislative Council for Port Philip Bay (1843–1845)

=== Want ===
- Randolph Want (1811–1869), Member of the New South Wales Legislative Council (1856–1861); His son:
  - Jack Want (1846–1905), Independent/Free Trade Member of the New South Wales Legislative Assembly for Gundagai (1885–1889) and Paddington (1889–1894), Member of the New South Wales Legislative Council (1894–1905), minister in the Dibbs, Jennings and Reid governments (1885–1887, 1894–1899).

=== Watkins ===
- David Watkins was Member for Newcastle 1901–1935, while his son
  - David O. Watkins was Member for the same seat 1935–1958.

=== Weatherill ===
- George Weatherill (1936–2021), Labor Member of the South Australian Legislative Council (1986–2000); His son:
  - Jay Weatherill (born 1964), Labor Premier of South Australia (2011–2018), Member of the South Australian House of Assembly for Cheltenham (2002–2018), minister in the Rann government (2011–2011).

=== Webster ===
- Leslie Webster (1891-1975), Country Member of the Victorian Legislative Assembly for Bulla and Dalhousie (1944–1945) and Mernda (1945–1947); His son:
  - James Webster (1925–2022), Country/National Country Senator for Victoria (1964–1980), minister in the Fraser government (1975–1979).

=== Wentworth/Hill/Griffiths/Scott/Cooper ===
- William Charles Wentworth I (1790–1872), member of the New South Wales Legislative Council for various periods between 1843 and 1862, including President of the Legislative Council (1861–1862)
- D'Arcy Wentworth, Jr. (1793–1861), member of the NSW Legislative Council (1843–1845), brother of W. C. Wentworth I
- William Charles Wentworth IV AO (1907–2003), member of the Australian House of Representatives (1949– 1977) and in the Ministry (1968–1972), great grandson of W. C. Wentworth I
- George Neville Griffiths (1840–1905), member of the New South Wales Legislative Assembly (1882–1885), grandfather of W. C. Wentworth IV
- John Scott (1821–1898), apart from 1869, member of the Queensland Legislative Assembly (1868–1888) and of the Queensland Legislative Council (1888–1890), father-in-law of G.N. Griffiths and great grandfather of W. C. Wentworth IV
- George Hill (1802–1883), Mayor of Sydney (1850), alderman of the City of Sydney (1842–1851) and (1857–1858), and member of the NSW Legislative Council (1848–1849) and (1856–1861), great grandfather of W. C. Wentworth IV, his daughter, Mary Jane being the wife of Fitzwilliam, the son of W. C. Wentworth I
- Richard Hill (1810–1895). Member of the NSW Legislative Assembly (1868–1877), member of the Legislative Council (1880–1895), brother of George Hill, and whose wife, Henrietta Cox, was the sister of Sarah, the wife of W. C. Wentworth I
- William Charles Hill (1838–1919), member of the NSW Legislative Council (1900–1919), son of Richard Hill
- Sir Daniel Cooper, 1st Baronet (1821–1902), member of the NSW Legislative Council (1849–1851) and (1855–1856), member of the NSW Legislative Assembly (1856–1860) and the Assembly's first Speaker, his wife Elizabeth being the sister of George Hill and Richard Hill

=== Whan ===
- Bob Whan (1933–2015), Labor Member of the Australian House of Representatives for Eden-Monaro (1972–1975); His son:
  - Steve Whan (born 1964), Labor Member of the New South Wales Legislative Assembly for Monaro (2003–2011, 2023– ), Member of the New South Wales Legislative Council (2011–2015), minister in the Rees (2008–2009), Keneally (2009–2011) and Minns (2023– ) governments.

=== White ===
- Alfred White (1902–1987), Labor Member of the Tasmanian House of Assembly for Denison (1941–1959), minister in the Cosgrove and Reece governments (1958–1959), Agent-General for Tasmania (1959–1971); His son:
  - John White (1942–2020), Labor Member of the Tasmanian House of Assembly for Denison (1986–1998), Member of the Tasmanian Legislative Council for Newdegate (1998–1999), minister in the Groom government (1989–1992).

=== Whitlam ===
- Gough Whitlam (1916–2014), MHR for Werriwa (1952–1978), Prime Minister (1972–75)
- Tony Whitlam (1944–), MHR for Grayndler (1975–77), Justice on the Federal Court of Australia (1993–2005)

=== Wienholt ===
- Arnold Wienholt Sr. (1826–1895), member of the Queensland Legislative Assembly for Warwick (1863–1867); His brother:
- Edward Wienholt (1833–1904), Member of the Queensland Legislative Assembly for Western Downs (1870–1873) and Darling Downs (1873–1875); His son:
  - Arnold Wienholt (1877–1940), Nationalist Member of the Australian House of Representatives for Moreton (1919–1922), Member of the Queensland Legislative Assembly for Fassifern (1909–1913, 1930–1935).

=== Willesee ===
- Donald Robert "Don" Willesee (1916–2003) was a member of the Australian Senate for Western Australia 1950–1975, and a minister in the Whitlam government. His brother,
- William Francis "Bill" Willesee (1911–2000) was a member of the Western Australian Legislative Council 1954–1974, and a minister in the Tonkin government.

=== Willmott ===
- F. E. S. Willmott (1870–1941), MLA in Western Australia 1914–1921, MLC in Western Australia 1921–1926; father of F. D.
- Edmund Brockman (1882–1938), MLA in Western Australia 1933–1934; brother-in-law of F. E. S.
- William Willmott (1895–1947), MLA in Western Australia 1938–1947; nephew of F. E. S.
- F. D. Willmott (1904–2004), MLA in Western Australia 1955–1974; son of F. E. S.

=== Wills ===
- Sir Eric Willis was Member of the NSW Legislative Assembly for Earlwood 1950–1978, and was Premier of New South Wales for a few months in 1976. His brother
- Max Willis, was Member of the New South Wales Legislative Council 1970–1999.

=== Wilshire ===
- James Robert Wilshire (1809–1860), Member of the New South Wales Legislative Council (1855–1856, 1858–1860); His son:
  - James Thompson Wilshire (1837–1909), Free Trade Member of the New South Wales Legislative Assembly for Canterbury (1889–1891).

=== Wilson ===
- Sir Keith Wilson was Senator for South Australia from 1938 to 1944 and MHR for Sturt from 1949–1954 and 1955–1966. His son
- Ian represented Sturt from 1966–1969 and 1972–1993 and was a minister in the Fraser government. Ian was also great-grandson of Sir John Langdon Bonython MHR for South Australia 1901–1906 and great-great grandson of Sir John Cox Bray, the first native born premier of South Australia

=== Windeyer ===
- Charles Windeyer (1780–1855), Mayor of Sydney (1842); His son:
  - Richard Windeyer (1806–1847), member of the New South Wales Legislative Council for County of Durham (1843–1847); His son:
    - Sir William Charles Windeyer (1834–1897), Member of the New South Wales Legislative Assembly for Lower Hunter (1859–1860), West Sydney (1860–1862, 1866–1872) and University of Sydney (1876–1879), minister in the Martin (1870–1872) and Parkes governments (1877, 1878–1879).

=== Wise ===
- Edward Wise (1818–1865), Member of the New South Wales Legislative Council (1857–1860), minister in the Forster government (1859–1860); His son:
  - Bernhard Wise (1858–1916), Free Trade Member of the New South Wales Legislative Assembly for South Sydney (1887–1889, 1891–1894), Sydney-Flinders (1894–1895) and Ashfield (1898–1900), minister in the Parkes government (1887–1888).

=== Wood ===
- Les Wood (1907–1958), Labor Member of the Queensland Legislative Assembly for East Toowoomba (1946–1947) and North Toowoomba (1950–1958); His twin sons:
  - Peter Wood (1935–2010), Labor Member of the Queensland Legislative Assembly for Toowoomba East (1966–1972 and Toowoomba South (1972–1974); And:
  - Bill Wood (1935–2024), Labor Member of the Queensland Legislative Assembly for Cook (1969–1972) and Barron River (1972–1974).

=== Woolcott ===
- Richard Woolcott (1927–2023), Secretary of the Department of Foreign Affairs (1988–1992), Permanent Representative of Australia to the United Nations (1982–1988), Australian Ambassador to Indonesia (1975–1978); His son:
  - Peter Woolcott (born 1953), Australian High Commissioner to New Zealand (2016–2017), Australian Public Service Commissioner (2018–2023), Australian Ambassador to Italy (2004–2007).

=== Wooldridge ===
- Michael Wooldridge was a Member of the House of Representatives, and Minister for Health 1996–2001 in the Howard government. His sister,
- Mary Wooldridge, has been a member of the Victorian Legislative Assembly since 2006 and a minister in the Victorian Government.

=== Wordsworth ===
- Robert Wordsworth (1894–1984), Liberal Senator for Tasmania (1950–1959), Administrator of Norfolk Island (1962–1964); His son:
  - David Wordsworth (1930–2024), Liberal Member of the Western Australian Legislative Council for South Province (1971–1989) and Agricultural Region (1989–1993), minister in the Court government (1977–1982).

=== Wriedt ===
- Ken Wriedt (1927–2010) (Senator for TAS). Minister in the Whitlam government. Daughter;
- Paula Wriedt (born 1968) (MP) 1996–2009. Minister in the Tasmanian Government.

=== Wright ===
- Jack Wright was Deputy Premier of South Australia from 1982 to 1985 and a Labor Member for Adelaide in the South Australian House of Assembly from 1971 to 1985. His son
  - Michael Wright was the Labor member for Lee in the South Australian House of Assembly from 1997 to 2014 and a minister in the South Australian Government.

=== Wyatt ===
- Cedric Wyatt (1940–2014), federal candidate for Kalgoorlie 1996. Son;
- Ben Wyatt (born 1974), Member of Western Australian Legislative Assembly 2006–2021 and Minister in the McGowan Government. Cousin;
- Ken Wyatt (born 1952), Member of the Australian House of Representatives 2010–2022. Minister in the Turnbull and Morrison governments.

== Spouses ==
There have been several instances of married couples being individually elected or appointed to office in Australian federal and state politics. In some cases, male politicians have died in office and were succeeded by their wives. (Millie Peacock won the by-election for the Electoral district of Allandale, replacing her husband Alexander Peacock) and Fanny Brownbill succeeded her husband William Brownbill in the Electoral district of Geelong following his death.

In other cases the couples represented the same geographic areas but in different electoral districts (Carmel Tebbutt represented the state Electoral district of Marrickville at the same time her husband Anthony Albanese represented the overlapping federal Division of Grayndler, Carryn Sullivan represented the state Electoral district of Pumicestone while her husband Jon Sullivan represented the federal Division of Longman), or similar geographic areas but at different times (Linda Lavarch represented the state Electoral district of Kurwongbah shortly after her husband Michael Lavarch failed to win re-election as the federal Member for Dickson).

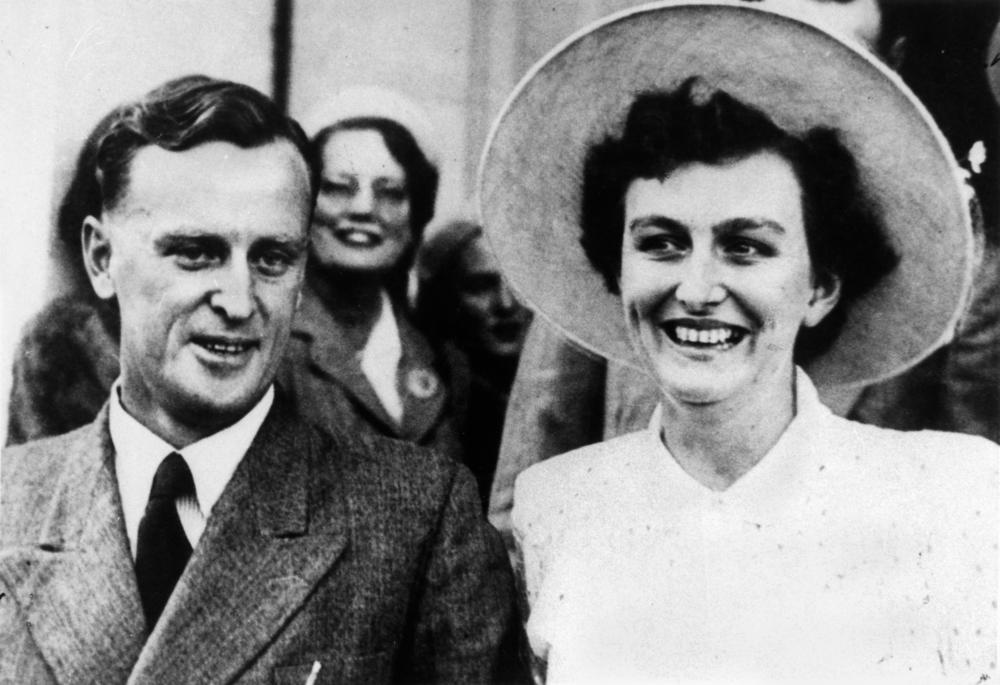
Joh and Florence Bjelke-Petersen, 1952

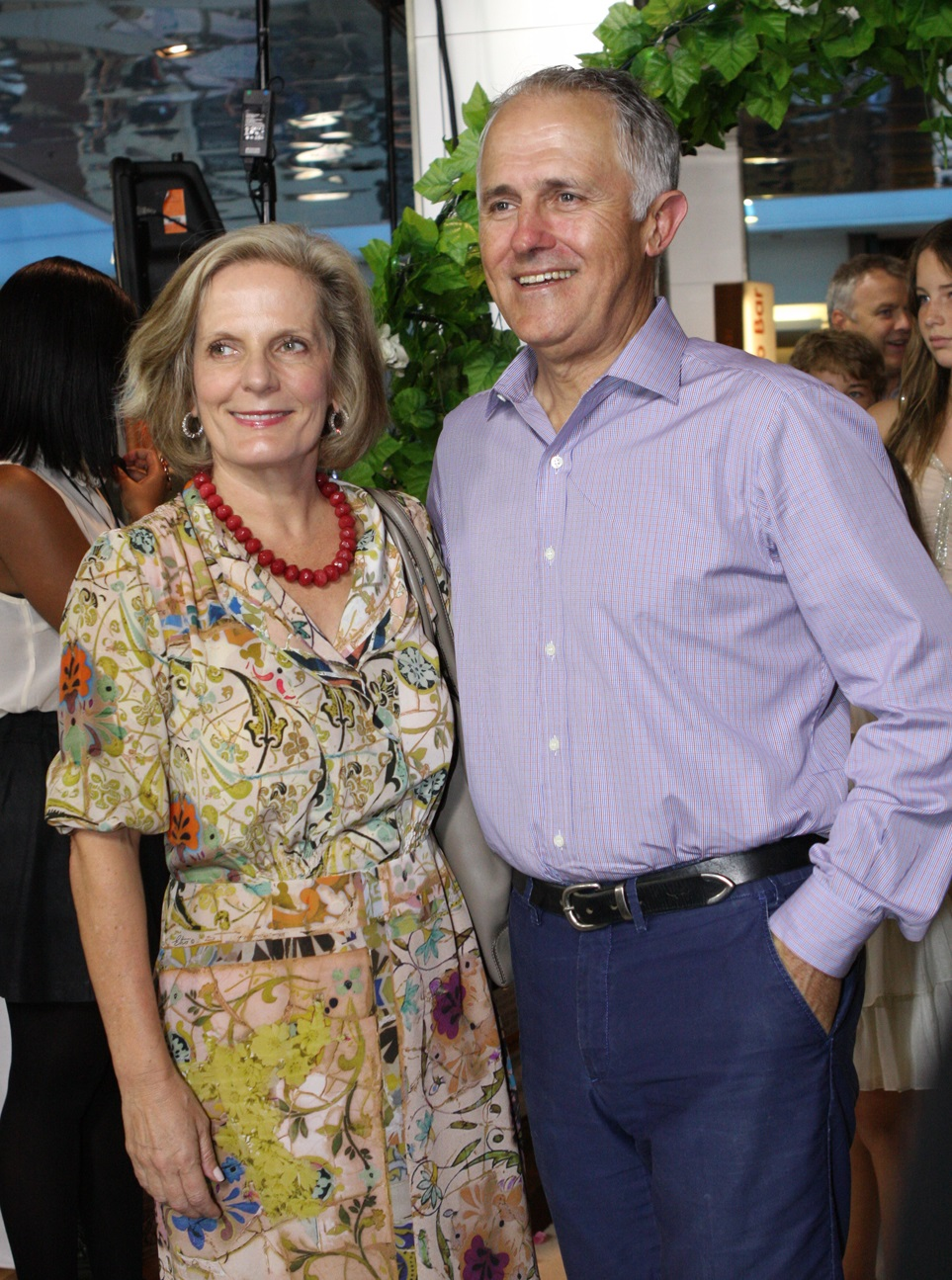
Lucy and Malcolm Turnbull, 2012

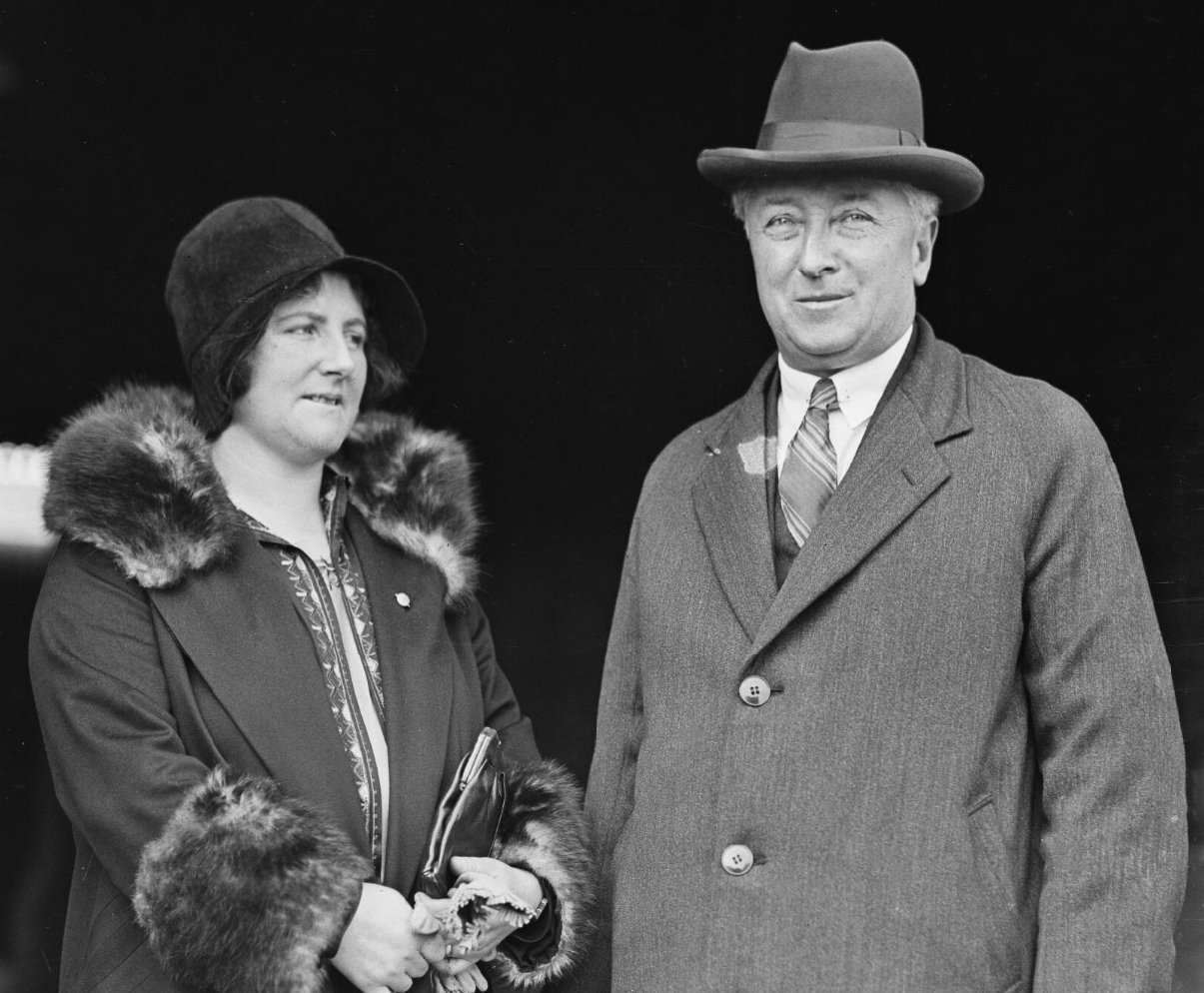
Enid and Joseph Lyons, 1930

=== Anthony Albanese and Carmel Tebbutt ===
- Anthony Albanese has been a Member of the House of Representatives since 1996, and Prime Minister of Australia since 2022. He also served as a minister in the Rudd and Gillard Governments. His ex-wife, Carmel Tebbutt was a member of New South Wales Legislative Assembly from 2005 until her retirement in 2015, Education Minister 2005–2007, and Deputy Premier of the State of NSW from 2008–2011.

=== Florence and Joh Bjelke-Petersen ===
- Sir Joh Bjelke-Petersen (1911–2005), Country/Nationals Premier of Queensland (1968–1987), minister in the Nicklin and Pizzey governments (1963–1968); His wife:
- Lady Florence Bjelke-Petersen (1920–2017), Nationals Senator for Queensland (1981–1993).

=== Steele Hall and Joan Bullock ===
- Steele Hall (1928–2024), Liberal Premier of South Australia (1968–1970), Member of the Australian House of Representatives for Boothby (1981–1996), Senator for South Australia (1974–1977), Member of the South Australian Legislative Assembly for Gouger (1959–1973) and Goyder (1973–1974); His wife:
- Joan Bullock (born 1946), Liberal Member of the South Australian Legislative Assembly for Coles (1993–2002) and Morialta (2002–2006).

=== Bob and Brenda Gibbs ===
- Bob Gibbs (born 1946), Labor Member of the Queensland Legislative Assembly for Wolston (1977–1992) and Bundamba (1992–1999), minister in the Goss (1989–1996) and Beattie (1998–1999) governments; His wife:
- Brenda Gibbs (born 1947), Labor Senator for Queensland (1992–2002).

=== Linda and Michael Lavarch ===
- Michael Lavarch was Member of Parliament 1987–1996 and Attorney-General in the Keating government 1993–1996. His wife, Linda Lavarch, was Member for Kurwongbah in the Queensland Parliament, from 1997 to 2009, and was Attorney-General in the Beattie government 2005–2006.

=== Mary and Michael Easson ===
- Mary Easson (born 1955), Labor Member of the Australian House of Representatives for Lowe (1993–1996); Her husband:
- Michael Easson (born 1955), Vice President of the Australian Council of Trade Unions (1993–1994), senior vice president of New South Wales Labor (1993–1995), secretary of the Labor Council of New South Wales (1989–1994).

=== Joseph and Enid Lyons ===
- Joseph Lyons (1879–1939) was Tasmanian Leader of the Opposition 1916–23, 1928–29; Premier of Tasmania 1923–28; federal Member for Wilmot 1929–39; Leader of the Opposition 1931–32; 10th Prime Minister of Australia 1932–39. Wife;
- Dame Enid Lyons (1897–1981) was MHR for Darwin 1943–51. First female member of the House of Representatives. Minister in the Menzies Government.

=== Jocelyn and Kevin Newman ===
- Kevin Newman (1933–99) – (MP for Bass (TAS)) 1975–84. Minister in the Fraser government. His wife
- Jocelyn Newman (1937–2018) – (Senator for Tasmania) 1986–2002. She was a Minister in the Howard government.

=== Alexander and Millie Peacock ===
- Alexander Peacock (1861–1933), Nationalist/UAP Premier of Victoria (1901–1902, 1914–1917, 1924), Speaker of the Victorian Legislative Assembly (1928–1933), Member of the Victorian Legislative Assembly for Clunes and Allandale (1899–1904) and Allandale (1904–1933); His wife:
- Millie Holden (1870–1948), UAP Member of the Victorian Legislative Assembly for Allandale (1933–1935)

=== Jane and Ian Prentice ===
- Ian Prentice was a Liberal Party member of the Queensland Legislative Assembly for Toowong from 1980 to 1983. His wife, Jane Prentice, has been the federal member for the Queensland seat of Ryan since 2010.

=== Carryn and Jon Sullivan ===
- Carryn Sullivan (born 1955), Labor Member of the Queensland Legislative Assembly for Pumicestone (2001–2012); Her husband:
- Jon Sullivan (1950–2021), Labor Member of the Queensland Legislative Assembly for Glass House (1989–1992) and Caboolture (1992–1998), Member of the Australian House of Representatives for Longman (2007–2010).

=== Kelvin and Marsha Thomson ===
- Kelvin Thomson was an MP in the Victorian Legislative Assembly from 1988–1995 and was MHR for Wills in the Australian Parliament from 1996 until his retirement in 2016. His ex-wife Marsha Thomson was a member of the Victorian Legislative Council (1999–2006) and has represented Footscray in the Victorian Legislative Assembly since 2006. She was the first Jewish woman to be a minister in any Australian Government serving in the Bracks and Brumby cabinets.

=== Ellie Whiteaker and David Scaife ===
- Ellie Whiteaker, Labor Senator for Western Australia (2025–); Her husband:
- David Scaife (born 1988), Labor Member of the Western Australian Legislative Assembly for Cockburn (2021–)

=== Malcolm and Lucy Turnbull ===
- Malcolm Turnbull (born 1954) served as Prime Minister of Australia (2015–2018) and MHR for Wentworth (2004–2018). His wife;
- Lucy Turnbull (née Hughes, born 1958) served as Lord Mayor of Sydney (2003–2004) and Councillor for the City of Sydney (1999–2004).

=== William and Fanny Brownbill ===
- William Brownbill (1864–1938), Labor Member of the Victorian Legislative Assembly for Geelong (1920–1932, 1935–1938); His wife:
- Fanny Brownbill (1890–1948), Labor Member of the Victorian Legislative Assembly for Geelong (1938–1948).

=== Sophie and Greg Mirabella ===
- Sophie Mirabella (born 1968), Liberal Member of the Australian House of Representatives for Indi (2001–2013); Her husband:
- Greg Mirabella (born 1960), Liberal Senator for Victoria (2021–2022).

=== Maurice and Doris Blackburn ===
- Maurice Blackburn (1880–1944), Victorian Labor Party Member of the Australian House of Representatives for Bourke (1934–1943), Speaker of the Victorian Legislative Assembly (1933–1934), Member of the Victorian Legislative Assembly for Clifton Hill (1927–1934), Fitzroy (1925–1927) and Essendon (1914–1917); his wife:
- Doris Blackburn (1889–1949), Independent Labor Member of the Australian House of Representatives for Bourke (1946–1949).

=== Ellie Whiteaker and David Scaife ===
- Ellie Whiteaker, Labor Senator for Western Australia (2025– ); Her Husband:
- David Scaife (born 1988), Labor Member of the Western Australian Legislative Assembly for Cockburn (2021– )

=== Susan Ryan and Richard Butler ===
- Susan Ryan (1942–2020), Labor Senator for the Australian Capital Territory (1975–1988), minister in the Hawke government (1983–1988), Age Discrimination Commissioner (2011–2016); Her husband:
- Richard Butler (born 1942), Governor of Tasmania (2003–2004).

=== Belinda Neal and John Della Bosca ===
- Belinda Neal (born 1963), Labor Senator for New South Wales (1994–1998), Member of the Australian House of Representatives for Robertson (2007–2010), Councillor for Central Coast Council (2024– ); Her husband:
- John Della Bosca (born 1956), Labor Member of the New South Wales Legislative Council (1999–2010), minister in the Carr, Iemma, Rees and Keneally governments (1999–2009).

=== Dana and Russell Wortley ===
- Dana Wortley (born 1959), Labor Member of the South Australian House of Assembly for Torrens (2014–2026), Senator for South Australia (2005–2011); Her husband:
- Russell Wortley (born 1957), Labor Member of the South Australian Legislative Council (2006– ), President of the South Australian Legislative Council (2014–2018), minister in the Rann and Weatherill governments (2011–2013).

=== Alison Byrnes and Paul Scully ===
- Alison Byrnes (born 1974), Labor Member of the Australian House of Representatives for Cunningham (2022– ); and her husband:
- Paul Scully (born 1974), Labor Member of the New South Wales Legislative Assembly for Wollongong (2016– ), minister in the Minns government (2023– )

=== Jim McKiernan and Jackie Watkins ===
- Jim McKiernan (1944–2018), Labor Senator for Western Australia (1984–2002); His wife:
- Jackie Watkins (born 1949), Labor Member of the Western Australian Legislative Assembly for Joondalup (1983–1989) and Wanneroo (1989–1993).

=== Trish Worth and Michael Cobb ===
- Trish Worth (born 1946), Liberal Member of the Australian House of Representatives for Division of Adelaide (1993–2004); Her husband:
- Michael Cobb (born 1945), Nationals Member of the Australian House of Representatives for Parkes (1984–1998).

=== Helen and Joe Bullock ===
- Helen Bullock (1965–2024), Labor Member of the Western Australian Legislative Council for Mining and Pastoral (2009–2013); Her husband:
- Joe Bullock (born 1955), Labor Senator for Western Australia (2014–2016).

=== Sally Talbot and Jon Ford ===
- Sally Talbot (born 1953), Labor Member of the Western Australian Legislative Council for South West region (2005–2025), assistant secretary of the Western Australian Labor Party (2001–2005), president of the Western Australian Labor Party (2008–2012); Her husband:
- Jon Ford (born 1958), Labor Member of the Western Australian Legislative Council for Electoral region of Mining and Pastoral (2001–2013), minister in the Gallop and Carpenter governments (2005–2008).

=== John Graham and Jenny McAllister ===
- John Graham, Labor Member of the New South Wales Legislative Council (2016– ), minister in the Minns government (2023– ); His wife:
- Jenny McAllister (born 1973), Labor Senator for New South Wales (2015– ), minister in the Albanese government (2024– ), National President of the Australian Labor Party (2011–2015).

=== Steve Hutchins, Diane Beamer, Natalie Hutchins ===
- Steve Hutchins (1956–2017), Labor Senator for New South Wales (1998–2011);

His first wife:

- Diane Beamer (born 1960), Labor Member of the New South Wales Legislative Assembly for Badgerys Creek (1995–1999) and Mulgoa (1999–2011), minister in the Carr (2003–2005) and Iemma (2005–2007) governments.

His second wife:

- Natalie Hutchins (born 1972), Labor Member of the Victorian Legislative Assembly for Keilor (2010–2014) and Sydenham (2014– ), minister in the Andrews (2014–2018, 2020–2023) and Allan (2023– ) governments.

== See also ==
- Political families of South Australia
- List of political families
- Politics of Australia
- List of political families in the United Kingdom
- List of Canadian political families
- List of United States political families
- Six hungry families
