= James Hill =

James Hill may refer to:

== Law and politics ==
- French Hill (politician) (born 1956), born James French Hill, American politician from Arkansas
- James Hill (antiquary) (died 1727), English barrister and antiquary
- James L. Hill (1834–1888), American local politician (Madison, Wisconsin)
- Sir James Hill, 1st Baronet (1849–1936), British politician
- James Hill (Labour politician) (1899–1966), British MP for Midlothian
- Sir James Hill (Conservative politician) (1926–1999), British MP for Southampton Test
- James Hill (Wisconsin legislator) (1825–1897), American politician
- James Hill (Mississippi politician) (1830s–1903), Reconstruction-era politician
- James Clinkscales Hill (1924–2017), American federal judge
- James Ferguson Hill (1871–1950), politician in Ontario, Canada
- James T. Hill Jr. (active 1944–53), American military attorney
- James W. Hill (1791–1864), American farmer, lawyer, and politician
- James Hill (Florida politician) (born 1947), American politician from Florida

== Military ==
- James Hill (Medal of Honor, 1863) (1822–1909), American Civil War Medal of Honor recipient
- James Samuel Hill (1845–1865), American Civil War Medal of Honor recipient
- James Hill (British Army officer) (1911–2006), British World War II paratroop commander
- James E. Hill (1921–1999), United States Air Force 4-star general
- James A. Hill (1923–2010), United States Air Force 4-star general
- James T. Hill (born 1946), United States Army 4-star general

== Sports ==
- James Hill (1910s footballer) (active 1917–21), English footballer
- James Hill (footballer, born 2002), English footballer
- James Enoch Hill (1929–2018), American Olympic shooter
- James Hill (rower) (1930–2020), New Zealand Olympic rower
- Dave Hill (golfer) (James David Hill, 1937–2011), American golfer
- James Hill (American football) (born 1974), American football player

== Entertainment ==
- James Hill (actor), English actor
- James Hill (folk musician) (c. 1811–1853), British fiddler and composer
- James John Hill (1811–1882), English landscape and portrait painter
- James Hill (British director) (1919–1994), British film and television director and producer
- James Hill (American film producer) (1916–2001), American film producer
- James William Hill (born 1953), American filmmaker and political theorist
- James Hill (Canadian musician) (born 1980), Canadian ukulele player and educator
- James Hill, American member of The Fairfield Four gospel group
- James Hill (TV personality) (born 1987), English reality TV personality
- James Hill (J. Hill, active 1974 and after), American big band musician and arranger
- Pseudonym of Storm Jameson (1891–1986), English journalist and novelist

== Other ==
- James Hill (master mason) (died 1734), British master mason
- James Hill (surgeon) (1703–1776), Scottish surgeon
- James Hill (merchant) (c. 1826–1901), founder of James Hill & Sons, South Australian motor cycle dealers
- James J. Hill (James Jerome Hill, 1838–1916), Canadian-American railroad magnate
- James G. Hill (1841–1914), American architect
- James B. Hill (1856–1945), American inventor
- James Peter Hill (1873–1954), British-born Australian embryologist
- James DeWitt Hill (1882–1927), American mail pilot
- James M. Hill (1899–1962), Canadian Roman Catholic bishop, first president of St. Thomas College
- James N. Hill (1943–1997), American archaeologist

== See also ==
- Cape James Hill, Greenland
- James J. Hill House, a house built by railroad magnate James J. Hill in Saint Paul, Minnesota
- James J. Hill Reference Library, public business research library in Saint Paul, Minnesota named after railroad magnate James J. Hill
- James J. Hill Sapphire, gemstone named after railroad magnate James J. Hill
- James M. Hill Memorial High School, high school in Miramichi, New Brunswick, Canada
- Jim Hill (disambiguation)
- Jimmy Hill (disambiguation)
