= George Dunn (Australian politician) =

Australian politician

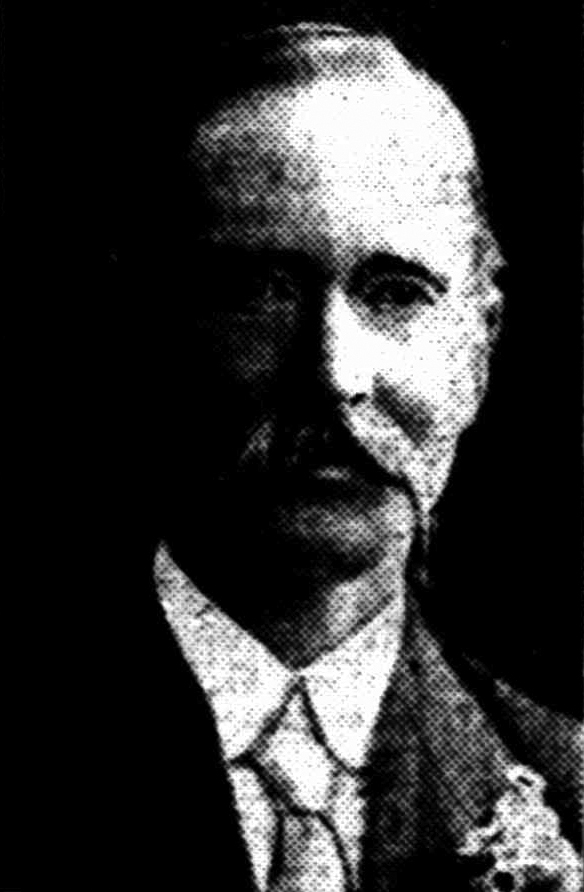

Personal details
- Born: George Alexander Dunn; 27 March 1859 Macclesfield, South Australia
- Died: 18 July 1925 (aged 66) Summertown, South Australia
- Party: United Labor Party then National Party
- Spouse: Kate Lindsay Wood (1864–1943)
- Parent(s): Thomas Dunn and Jane Dunn (nee Spiers)
- Nickname: David

George Alexander Dunn (27 March 1859 – 18 July 1925) was an Australian politician who represented the South Australian House of Assembly multi-member seat of Murray from 1915 to 1918, when his colleagues were Maurice Parish and Harry D. Young. He was elected as a member of the United Labor Party, but joined the National Party in 1917.

He was born at Macclesfield, South Australia, to Thomas (died before 1889) and his wife Jane Dunn (c. 1824 – October 1916), and served an apprenticeship as a carpenter. At the age of 14 he moved to Strathalbyn, and later to Adelaide. He spent some years in Victoria where he married Kate Lindsay Wood (daughter of Henry Wood, Melbourne) on 9 October 1889 at the Collins Street Congregational Church. He then returned to South Australia, settling in Summertown, where he was an orchardist. He served as a District Council of East Torrens councillor, and served a term as chairman. He was a member of the Summertown Institute and served as secretary and president, and was a trustee of the Agricultural and Horticultural Society.

He was not closely related to the old Dunn family of South Australia which included the miller John Dunn who founded Mount Barker, John Dunn Jr. MHA, William Henry Dunn MHA, William Paltridge MHA, Herbert Charles Dunn MHA, agriculturist Charles Dunn (1796–1881) who founded Charleston, South Australia, the Rev. William Arthur Dunn, president of Prince Alfred College, architect Hedley Allen Dunn, and embezzler and arsonist Alfred Henry Dunn (c. 1845–1904).
