= Green's Exchange =

Former stock exchange in Adelaide, Australia

Green's Exchange, also known as Green's Auction Mart, was a business on King William Street, Adelaide, in the early colonial days of South Australia. It was not the first, and by no means the only stock exchange in Adelaide, but was notable in its alternative use as a venue for large public meetings and performances.

== History ==
=== George Green ===
George Green (c. 1820 – 17 January 1895) arrived in South Australia in March 1848 aboard the David Malcolm from London. He had studied civil engineering in England, but finding little demand for the profession, turned to land surveying, with offices at 65 King William Street adjacent the Bank of Australasia from 1850.

By June 1853 he was advertising as a land agent and auctioneer with offices at the same address, under he title "Exchange Auction Mart" (still operating 1886). He also acted as a gold buyer for some of the banks, was for a time a director of the Moonta mines, and managed "Green's Exchange Room", which operated from May 1853 to at least November 1889.

Green had an arrangement with one William Green of Melbourne, who conducted a similar business from premises at 74 Queen Street, Melbourne later 30 Queen Street as "Green's Land, Share, and Adelaide Agency" later land agent and auctioneer at 71 Russell Street, proved insolvent 1863, back to 74 Queen Street in 1864. His subsequent history and relationship with George Green (if any) is yet to be found.

Green entered into partnership with James Parr as auctioneers and commission agents sometime before September 1857 and William Luxmoore joined before November that year. The partnership Green, Parr & Luxmoore was dissolved in March 1863. He had a separate partnership with William Wadham (1824–1895) from around 1857; Wadham moved to partnership with George Dutton Green (1 May 1850 – 27 April 1911) as Green & Co.

Green built a home on Palmer Place, and Wadham built a residence, "Rhyllon", a few doors away. He retired around 1880, though his involvement with the Exchange ceased around 1875, and returned to England, where he died, leaving a widow, two sons and two daughters.

=== The building ===
In 1854 Green remodelled the interior, to make a large open room suitable for meetings, concerts and receptions, though the pillars supporting the roof structure made it unsuitable for use as a ballroom. On both sides of the main entrance to the Exchange were offices of the South Australian Telegraph Department. Charles Todd, the Superintendent of Telegraphs, had those on the lefthand side, and the public offices on the right. The Exchange room was directly behind these offices; and on each side of the gallery which overlooked "The Room" (which had a glass roof) was a number of small professional offices, occupied by such as solicitor Henry Hay Mildred. The offices over the Telegraph Office were occupied by solicitors Belt, Cullen, & Wigley. Businessmen mentioned as habitués include T. F. Monteith, F. P. Bayley, C. J. Barry, William Mitchell, Walter Duffield, Capt. John Hart, John Dunn, Beeby & Dunstan and Thomas Magarey. The southern side was then a vacant block, with a garden behind the railing fence; later an extension of the Bank of Australasia. The northern side was a wine and spirits store used by R. H. Wigg, later the Bank of South Australia, and the Union Bank. Scott, Young, & Co., drapers, occupied the next building, the rear of which housed Henry Noltenius' wine store. The building was later leased by Hill, Mills, & Co., railway carriers, and their successors C. R. Darton & Co. This building occupied the northernmost site of what became Bowman's Arcade, which occupied most of the eastern half of Town Acre 109.

Green's lease elapsed shortly after his son George Dutton Green and others erected the Pirie Street Exchange, and the site reverted to Thomas Greaves Waterhouse, for whom Broken Hill Chambers (opened 1890), was built on the site by William McLean of the Melbourne firm of McLean Brothers, Rigg & Co. to the design of English & Soward. A feature of the building was a glass-roofed arcade running clear through to Gilbert Place. The freehold was sold to William Kither acting for Keith Bowman, and renamed Bowman's Arcade, which served Adelaide for a hundred years, and home of John Mack's camera shop.

A few highlights

- The first meeting of Stock Exchange members was held at Green's Exchange Rooms on 9 October 1854.
- A hastily called meeting of prominent citizens planned a farewell to Governor Young, who had been summarily transferred to Van Diemen's Land.
- Green's Exchange was not only used for general meetings of the Adelaide Choral Society, but also for their concerts.
- Meetings of the South Australian Chamber of Commerce were also held there.
- A gathering full to overflowing was called in March 1856 to protest Governor MacDonnell's sacking (through Police Commissioner Warburton) of Superintendent of Police Tolmer, by all events a zealous and efficient officer, and the hero of the Gold Escort, while promoting more sociable but less diligent officers.
- Green's Exchange was used by Rev. John Crawford Woods as a meeting-place for Unitarian Christians and for promoting socially progressive causes.
- A well-attended public meeting was held on 31 August 1858 at Green's Exchange, presided by Governor MacDonnell, formally to found the Aborigines' Friends' Association.
- On 1 September 1858 a very large meeting almost unanimously called on the City Council to borrow £30,000 to build a Town Hall, and other public amenities.

== Other Exchanges of the 1800s ==
Adelaide Stock Exchanges of the 1800s
1 Ross's Exchange adjacent Exchange Hotel
2 Neale's Mart & Exchange
3 Green's Exchange
4 Buildings 86–92 King Wm St
5 Royal Exchange, 96–98 King Wm St
6 Adelaide New Exchange, Pirie St
7 Stock Exchange of Adelaide, McHenry St.
- Bryce Ross ( – February 1870) hosted Adelaide's first Stock Exchange in Hindley Street; Crampton's (later Ware's) Exchange Hotel adjacent. Gresham Street was later extended through Acre 47 to Hindley Street, just west of the Exchange site, then became Gilbert Place.

The Exchange Hotel (previously Australian Arms, owned by Samuel Payne of Payneham fame) was a popular venue for large business meetings.

- J. Bentham Neales opened the Adelaide Commercial Exchange or Adelaide Exchange in front of his Auction Mart (also on Acre 47) at the corner of Hindley and King William streets in 1846, with Ross as manager/secretary and 200 subscribers.
- W. H. George, painter and glazier, opened his Royal Exchange on Hindley Street in April 1848, promising facilities as close to those of Lloyds or the Jerusalem coffee house in London as the colony could supply. Ross retaliated with the assertion that the Adelaide Commercial Exchange would be moving to a larger venue. George was proved insolvent later that year.

In 1849 George Coppin opened his Royal Exchange Hotel on Hindley Street, which was used for business meetings.

- G. Dutton Green, son of George Green, followed his father as a real estate agent, and was a member of the Exchange Land Company which founded the Pirie Street stock exchange on the site of King's timber yard. Other members were Henry and Frank Rymill (who owned the lease on the land), Joseph Fisher, William Kay, James Hill, J. C. Lovely (c. 1842–1915), and H. L. Vosz. "Adelaide New Exchange" was opened on 1 July 1880 at 22–30 Pirie Street, east of what is now Exchange Place.

An association, The Stock Exchange of South Australia, was founded there in May 1887. This exchange, which saw much business during the boom years of Broken Hill, moved to Comstock Chambers 90–92 King William Street (adjacent temporary premises of the Stock Exchange of Adelaide) in August 1891, and was wound up in October 1893.

- In 1887 John Robb built the Royal Exchange, King William Street, Royal Exchange" at 96–98 King William Street on the site of D. & W. Murray Limited's between Grenfelland Pirie streets. Designed by Wright, Reed & Beaver, it was one of the largest and handsomest in Australasia. The Adelaide Stock Exchange was founded there by Gavin F. Gardner and others. W. B. Carr was its long-serving president and its only life member.

The building was acquired by the Commonwealth Bank in 1922.

- The Stock Exchange of Adelaide Ltd., an Association founded in September 1887 by G. S. Aldridge, Henry Bellingham and others, first met on 3 October 1887 in Dutton Green's Pirie Street rooms, then from March 1888 in the Exchange Room of the Town Hall. They had a (No. 2) room at 86–88 King William Street 1888–1891, then for a time they used "The Barn", once a wool store on McHenry Street, (which runs through Town Acres 168 and 169 from Gawler Place) which had been purchased by the Association. In 1892 they moved to premises on King William Street. In 1901 they moved into their own premises, built by W. C. Torode to a design by architects Dunn & Fuller. A feature of the building was the "Federation Window", produced by Morris & Co., and commissioned by Sir George Brookman, a member.

In 1991 the Exchange left the building, which was purchased by the State Government, had it restored, and in 2009 reopened as The Science Exchange for Royal Institution of Australia.

== Gallery ==
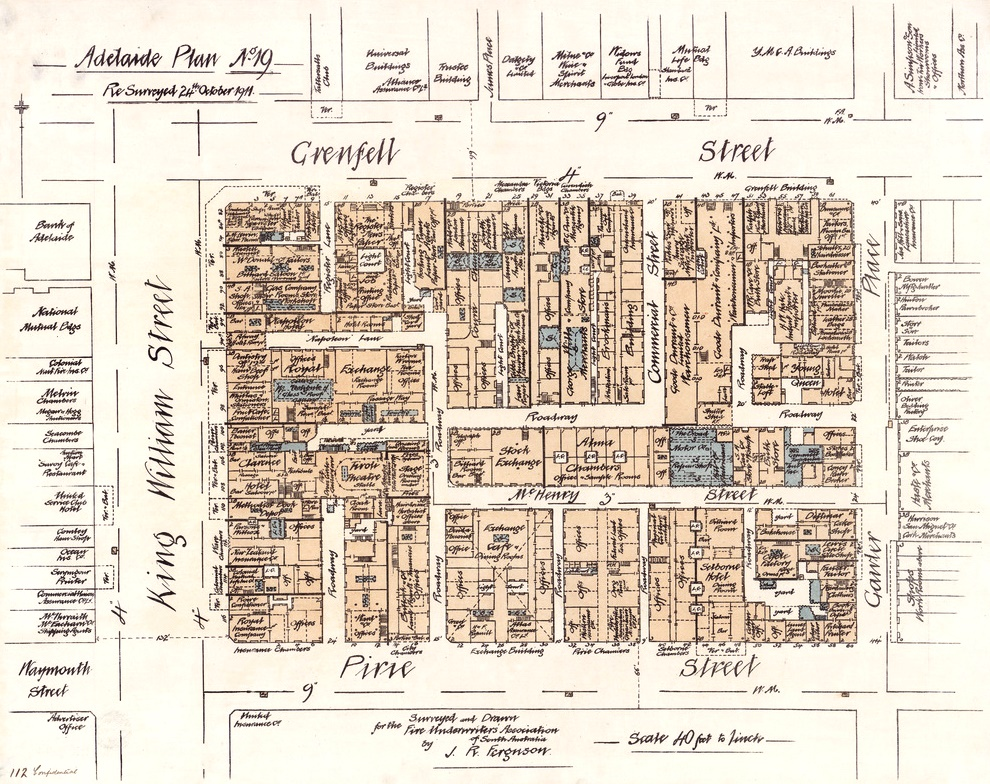
Map of occupancies, King William Street, Adelaide, between Grenfell and Pirie streets, 1911

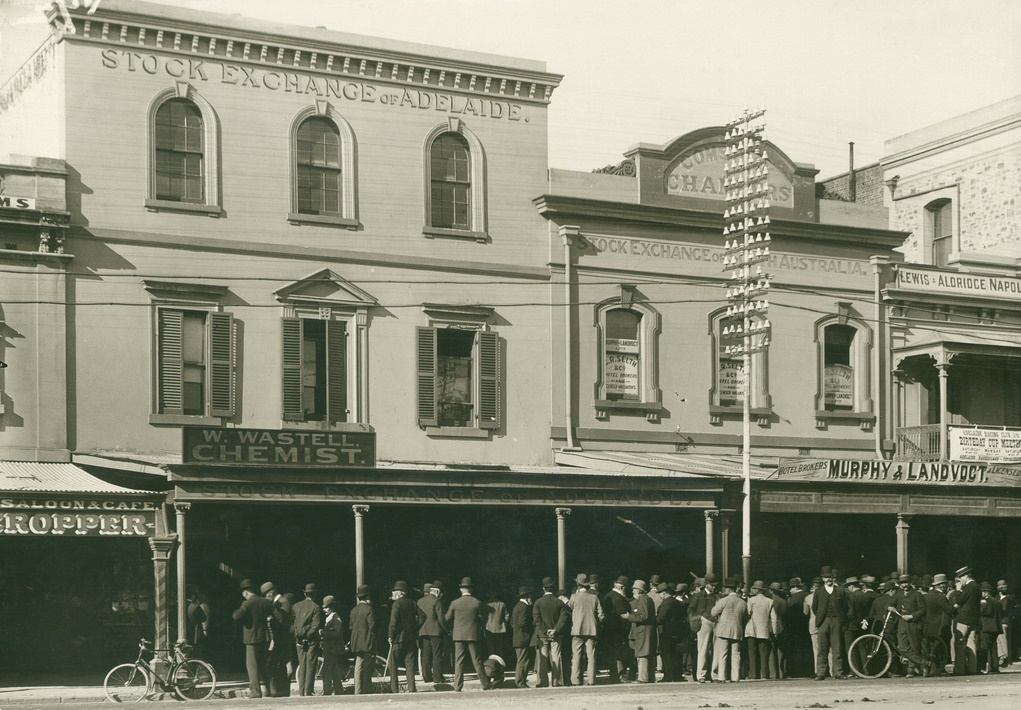
Two competing stock exchanges at 86–88 and 90–92 King William Street

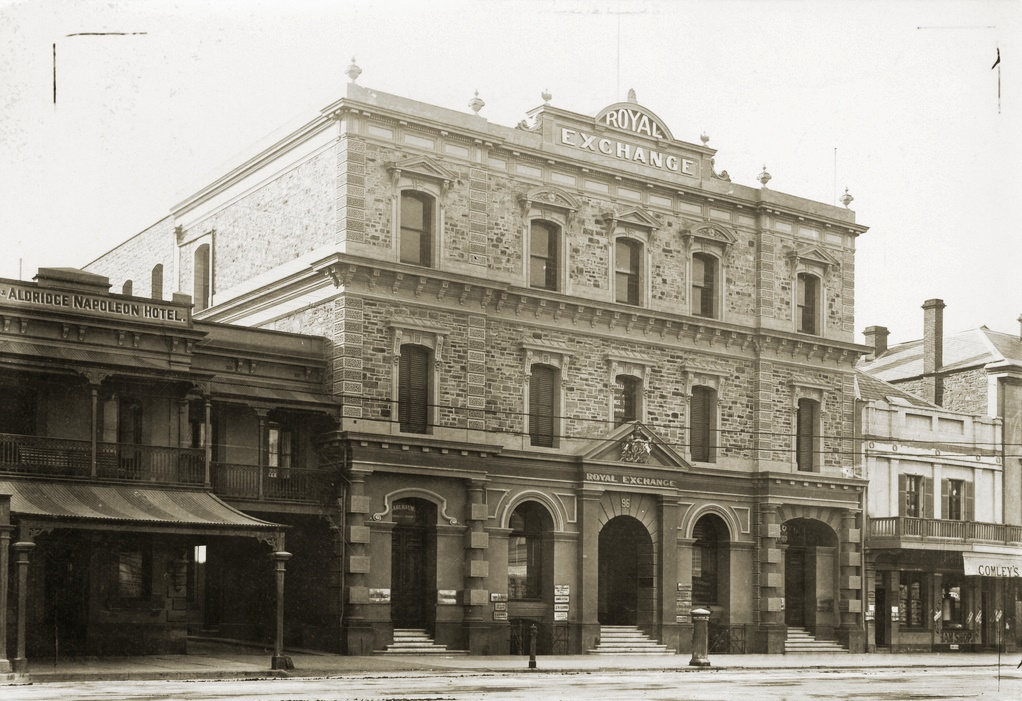
John Robb's Royal Exchange building, King William Street, Adelaide

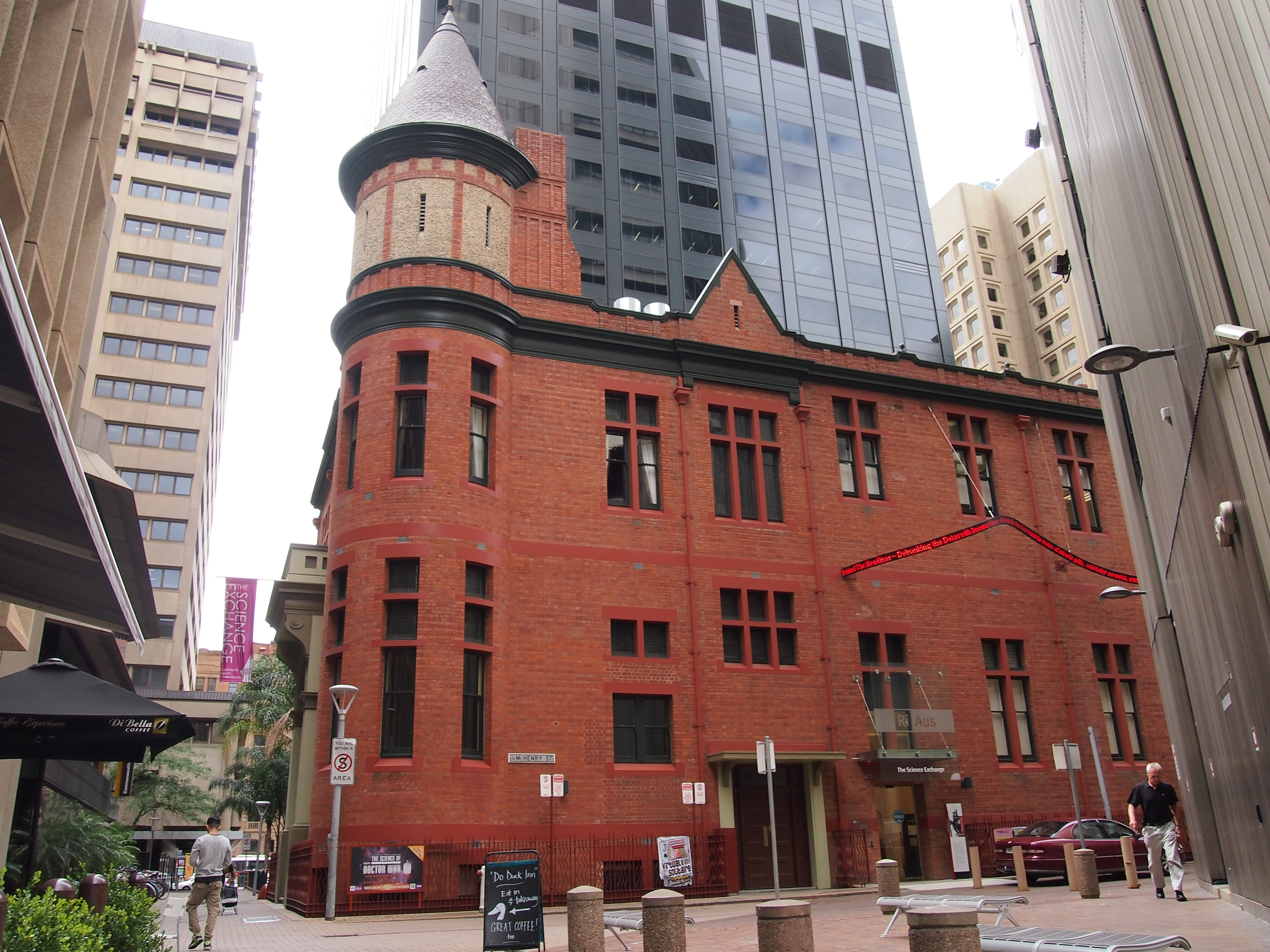
The Stock Exchange of Adelaide, now RiAus building
