= Adelaide Stock Exchange building =

Historic building in Adelaide, South Australia

Adelaide Stock Exchange
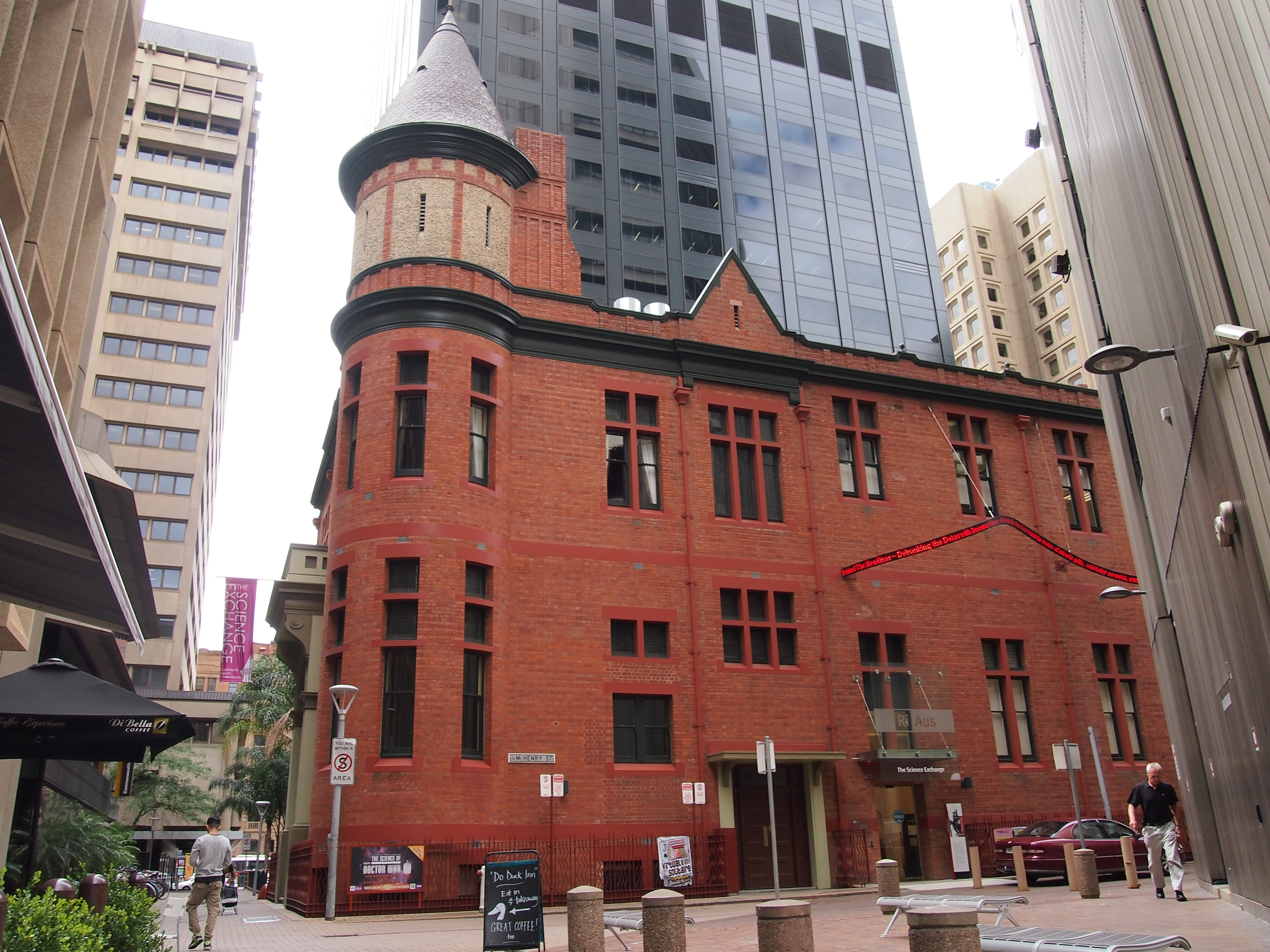
- Adelaide Stock Exchange in 2014
- Alternative names: Science Exchange

General information
- Type: Commercial
- Architectural style: Federation Queen Anne with Arts and Crafts
- Location: 53–57 Exchange Place, Adelaide, South Australia, Australia
- Coordinates: 34.92512°S 138.60078°E
- Current tenants: Conservation Council of South Australia
- Year built: 1900–1901
- Opened: 6 September 1901
- Renovated: 2007–2009
- Cost: A£8,380
- Client: Stock Exchange of Adelaide
- Owner: Government of South Australia

Technical details
- Material: Red brick and timber
- Floor count: 2

Design and construction
- Architects: Hedley Dunn and Henry Fuller
- Main contractor: Walter Torode

Renovating team
- Architect: Denis Harrison

South Australian Heritage Register
- Official name: Stock Exchange
- Designated: 8 November 1984
- Reference no.: 11580

The Adelaide Stock Exchange, also known as the Science Exchange, is a former stock exchange building in Exchange Place, Adelaide city centre, South Australia. It was designed by Hedley Allen Dunn and Henry Ernest Fuller and built by Walter C. Torode. The building, which is in the Federation Queen Anne style, was completed and opened on 6 September 1901. It was listed in the South Australian Heritage Register on 8 November 1984.

This building was built for the Stock Exchange of Adelaide, founded in 1887 and previously housed in various temporary buildings prior to their move to Exchange Place. The construction tender of Torode for A£8,380 was accepted in August 1900. The architectural elements of the building include red-brick walls, decorative stonework, and a corner tower with a candle snuffer spire. In 1902, a stained-glass window that celebrates the Federation of Australia, provided by George Brookman, was added. The window created by Morris & Co. is the work of John Henry Dearle with designs by Edward Burne-Jones.

In 1938 and again in 1982, the building was damaged by fire, which necessitated the making of many changes to the interior of the building. The stock exchange left the building in 1991 after the introduction of electronic trading. The Rann government acquired the building in 2007 and, through a restoration and adaptation project under the guidance of the architect Denis Harrison, transformed the building into the Science Exchange. In 2009, the building reopened as the headquarters of the Royal Institution of Australia.

== Background ==
Prior to the formation of the Stock Exchange of Adelaide, the meetings of brokers took place at Green's Exchange in King William Street, where it was also a meeting point of politicians, bankers, merchants and other businessmen. The Stock Exchange of Adelaide was founded in a meeting held by around 30 people at Albert Hall on 2 September 1887. The first general meeting of this exchange was held at the Pirie Street Exchange on 3 October 1887.

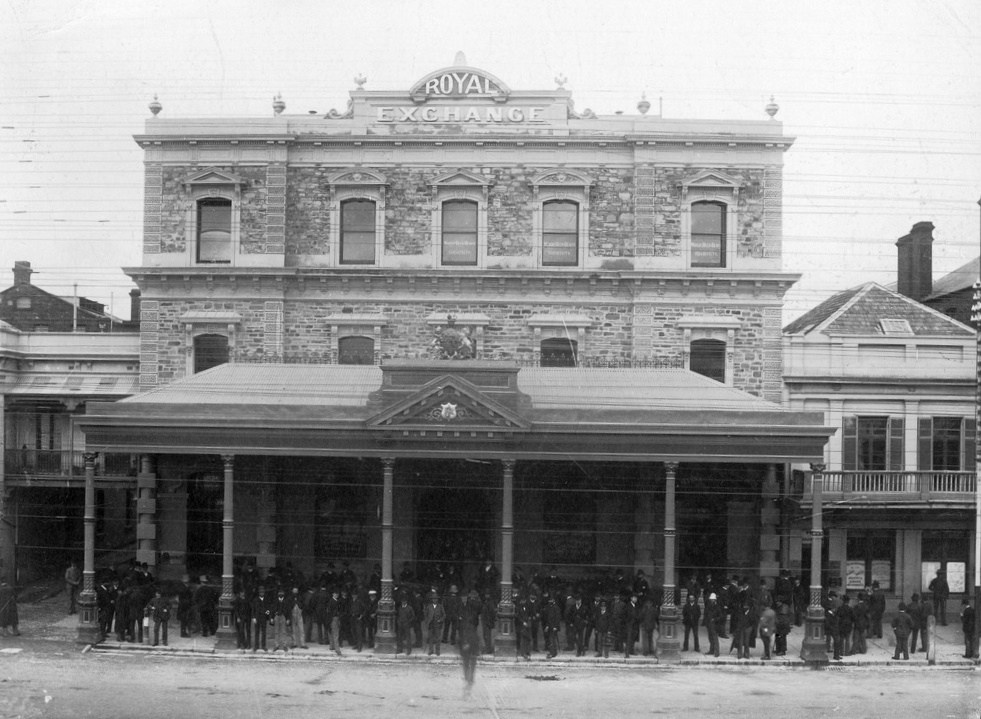
The Royal Exchange in 1890

In March 1888, the exchange temporarily moved to the Exchange Room in Adelaide Town Hall while the premises of the Royal Exchange in King William Street were being rebuilt. Later on, the exchange operated in a separate room of the Royal Exchange till 1891. Initially, membership was restricted to 65 but it later rose to 70 in August 1890. By 1890, the admission fee had increased from A£25 to £1,000. In the mid-1890s, it became the beneficiary of the Western Australian gold rushes.

In 1891, the exchange searched for permanent quarters and temporarily occupied "the Barn", which was located on the same site as its future building, whereas premises in King William Street were renovated to suit its needs. The latter was inaugurated in 1892 and consisted of an Exchange Hall where subscribers approved to do business with exchange members, but were not allowed into trading sessions.

== History ==
=== Construction and opening ===
Brokers seated at tiered desks inside the Adelaide Stock Exchange, c. 1901

Hedley Allen Dunn and Henry Ernest Fuller were the architects who designed the Adelaide Stock Exchange building. The tender submitted by Walter C. Torode at £8,380 was accepted in August 1900, while C. Lindsay was appointed clerk of works. On 20 August 1901, The Advertiser noted that the building was close to completion with an opening ceremony being planned by Governor Hallam Tennyson to take place on 6 September. The building was opened on this day by Premier John Jenkins who recognized the contributions made by the exchange members to South Australian mining operations.

Constructed in the year of Australian Federation, the building received a stained-glass window in 1902 that honored Federation and remained intact during the following fires in the building. This window was designed and gifted to the building by George Brookman, who celebrated the Federation, surviving the later fires in the building.

=== Fires and alterations ===
Adelaide Stock Exchange tower viewed along Exchange Place, 16 August 1954

On 9 June 1938, an electrical equipment failure caused a fire in the timber ceiling. Exchange members proceeded with their business when smoke was noticed, but then sparks dropped into the exchange through the ventilation system of the vestibule, leading to the cutting off of electricity and sounding of the alarm around 3:55 pm. The trading went on until about 4 pm when the police evacuated the building. Four fire engines responded to the alarm. Firefighters climbed up to the roof using a 60 feet ladder because smoke was coming out through the top of the tower. The building was later renovated.

The second fire that occurred in 1982 caused extensive damage to the interior of the building. During renovation, mezzanine floors were added along with offices and suspended ceilings. The exterior of the building remained the same. Most of the interior has to be reconstructed.

=== Heritage recognition and later use ===
The building has been listed on the South Australian Heritage Register since 8 November 1984 as "Former Stock Exchange of Adelaide". It is also included in the Register of the National Estate.

The stock exchange vacated the building in 1991 after the onset of electronic trading. In 2007, the Rann government acquired the empty building, and an adaptive reuse initiative under the leadership of architect Denis Harrison transformed the structure into Science Exchange. The restoration project preserved the western wing, which remained relatively intact and rehabilitated the fire-damaged eastern wing which saw the removal of office partitions and a suspended ceiling. The building was relaunched in 2009 as the new residence of Royal Institution of Australia (RiAus).

In September 2025, the Conservation Council of South Australia revealed its decision to move from The Joinery to the former stock exchange building, with the opening of its new office expected on 1 October.

The Adelaide Stock Exchange undergoing conservation work in 2026

Department for Environment and Water revealed conservation work to fix roof defects and water damage in 2026. The project, to be executed by G-Force Building and Consulting, will entail roof replacement and downpipe replacement along with fixing of the façade and windows, and replacement of water-damaged internal ceilings. Work was scheduled to run from approximately March to December 2026.

== Description and features ==
The old Adelaide Stock Exchange Building is located at 53–57 Exchange Place, situated between Grenfell and Pirie streets, east of King William Street. The building was constructed on the former temporary offices of the exchange known as "the Barn." According to the South Australian Heritage Register, the building is one of the examples of Federation Queen Anne style of architecture, while according to the 2010 conservation management plan it is Federation Arts and Crafts commercial style.

=== Exterior ===
This two-storey building has load-bearing walls made of red bricks set in English bond with rendered banding and decorative window surrounds. It has an asymmetric design, featuring a diagonally set corner bay and a southwest tower that terminates in a candle snuffer spire. The rough-cast finishes and decorative elements are indicative of the English Arts and Crafts architecture. The building features a porch with pilasters and decorative iron gates. Also, the cantilevered entrance canopy that projects over the Exchange Place road reserve has been listed as state heritage.

Despite being surrounded by taller structures, the corner tower and spire add character to the streetscape. Heritage evaluations reveal that the building represents a rare surviving example of Federation/Edwardian commercial building design in Adelaide. It features roof drainage with box gutters hidden behind parapets, with only a few outlets/downpipes that could easily become blocked.

=== Interior ===
The original interior consisted of high ceilings, fireplaces, and stained and varnished kauri-pine dados and ceilings. Decorative features consisting of iron gas chandeliers, brackets, and special door hardware. Facilities within the basement included billiards, smoking, lounge, and card rooms along with a bar. In addition, other facilities include a telegraph office, reading room, and a big vestibule where members would meet between trading sessions.

The call room on the upper floor had a rostrum for the chairman, secretary, and recorder with brokers' seating in an amphitheatre arrangement. Scroll decorations on the archway of the folding doors included the initials "A.S.E.", and there was a chute through which members could send telegrams from the room itself. Committee and secretarial rooms were also located on the same floor.

There have been fires and subsequent alterations that have considerably altered the interiors of the building. During the process of renovation into the Science Exchange, ceiling timbers, walls, floors, and decorative features of the original were maintained or used. While the western wing was renovated in its original style, the extensively reconstructed eastern wing housed an auditorium for about 200 people.

=== Federation window ===
The principal stairs contain a six-light stained glass window honouring the Australian Federation. This piece was produced by Morris & Co. in London between 1900 and 1901, and erected in 1902. It was designed by John Henry Dearle and incorporated designs by Edward Burne-Jones. It was given to the exchange by Brookman.

The three lower large lights illustrate Britannia surrounded by figures symbolising Australia, India, Africa, and Canada, the territories which make up the British Empire. The three upper lights illustrate Morning, Sun, and Evening and include motifs derived from Burne-Jones's works. The figure representing Africa can also be found in his The Star of Bethlehem.

With dimensions of 301 centimetres (119 in) high by 210 centimetres wide, this stained glass and lead window has survived two fires affecting the building. In 2007, Javier and Arantza Moll gave it to the Art Gallery of South Australia via the gallery's foundation. It is one of the pieces of the gallery's British Decorative Arts collection with accession number 20072A15.
