= William Wadham (Australian politician) =

Australian politician

William Wadham (c. 1815 – 8 December 1895) was a politician in the colony of South Australia.

== History ==
Wadham was born in Oxford, England, and spent the earlier part of his adult life as a schoolteacher. He arrived in South Australia in April 1850 and worked as an auctioneer and land agent in partnership with George Green (of Green's Exchange fame), then with his son George Dutton Green. He conducted some of the colony's largest private surveys and land deals; he was spectacularly successful and built a fine residence "Rhyllon" on Robe Terrace, Medindie.

In 1885 he was elected to the Legislative Council for the Northern District, but was forced to resign after his business collapsed. He contested the House of Assembly seat of Flinders, but was unsuccessful.

He died at his residence, Eastwood Terrace, Eastwood, South Australia, leaving a widow, two sons and two daughters.

== Family ==
He was married to Jane (c. May 1831 – 17 October 1912). among their children were:

- Emily Jane Wadham (c. 1853 – 3 August 1932)
- youngest son Arthur Percy (c. 1858 – 26 September 1916) died in England 1916; interred in family vault, West Terrace
