= John Dunn (miller) =

Australian politician and flour miller (1802–1894)

John Dunn Sr.
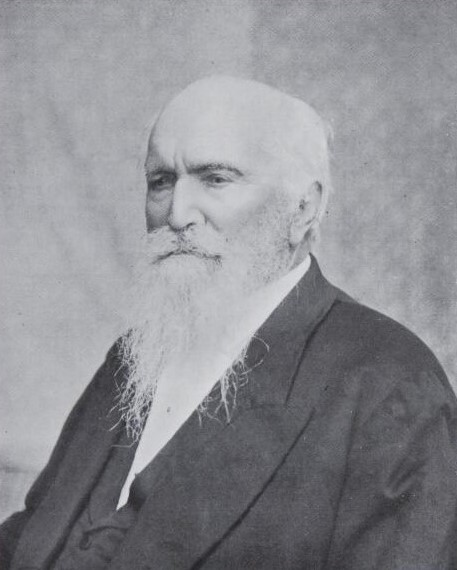

Personal details
- Born: John Dunn; 13 February 1802 Bondleigh, Devon, England
- Died: 13 October 1894 (aged 92) Mount Barker, South Australia
- Spouse(s): Ann Rowe (1802–1870) and Jane Cork Williams (c. 1833 – 1929)
- Relations: William Paltridge (son-in-law)
- Children: John Dunn Jr. (1830–1892), Mary Ann Hill (1832–1912), Elizabeth Paltridge (1834–1928), Eliza Dunn (1837–1856), William Henry Dunn (1841–1891)
- Parent(s): Charles Dunn and Thomasin Dunn (née Hooper)

John Dunn Sr. (13 February 1802 – 13 October 1894) was a flour miller in the early days of the colony of South Australia; a parliamentarian, philanthropist and a prominent citizen of Mount Barker, South Australia.

== Career ==
He was born in the parish of Bondleigh, Devon, the son of a small farmer. At the age of 10 he was working as a servant, then for seven years was apprenticed to a miller at North Tawton. He was then appointed manager of a steam mill in Bideford, Devon and in 1836 owned his own mill at Monkleigh, some 6 km to the south. On the suggestion of his brothers, who had emigrated earlier, he, his wife and four children, left for Australia on the Lysander, arriving at Port Adelaide on 6 September 1840.

He found employment with Borrow & Goodiar, then purchased land near his brother's property at Hay Valley (near Nairne), which he farmed and in 1842 built a windmill for grinding flour, possibly the first in Australia. The variability of wind in the area limited its usefulness, particularly as he had built the windmill with a fixed mechanism, and the angle of the sails could not be changed to match wind direction, and he ordered a small steam engine from England. While waiting for its arrival he worked for Ridley, helping to construct his famous reaper, proving its performance on D. McFarlane's land at Mount Barker.

For a time he managed the South Australian Company's first steam mill in Adelaide, which had been set up by William Randell.

His first steam mill, in Mount Barker, began working in 1844, the second steam mill in Australia at a time when South Australia was the only wheat producing colony in Australia.

Soon Ridley's, Hart's, Magarey's, and other brands of flour were exported to the other colonies, then overseas. Dunn's milling and grain business grew until the firm had eleven steam flour mills, five fitted with more modern roller machinery. Dunn's first steam mill was decommissioned as a flour mill by 1899, converted to become ancillary to leather production.

Dunn admitted his two sons into partnership as well as his son-in-law W. Hill, and his brother-in-law G. Shorney. W. H. Dunn left in approximately 1875 to farm in the North, and the remaining partnership was continued until the death of Hill in 1885 and Shorney in 1891. John Dunn retired from the business in 1889, leaving John Dunn, jr., as head of the firm.

== Politics ==
- He was on the District Council of Mount Barker as its chairman.
- On 9 March 1857 he was elected to the first Legislative Assembly with F. E. H. W. Krichauff as partner. Krichauff resigned on 12 March 1858 and was replaced with William Rogers.
- He was elected to the second Parliament on 27 April 1860 partnered with B. T. Finniss.
- He was elected to the third Parliament on 24 November 1862 with Mr. Allan McFarlane (– March 1864) as junior member. William Rogers was McFarlane's replacement.
- He was elected to the fourth Parliament, assembled 31 March 1865 with James Rankine. This parliament was dissolved on 26 March 1868 and Dunn was beaten in the election of the fifth Parliament by John Cheriton. On 12 August however a fresh election was called by the Court of Disputed Returns and Dunn was elected along with Cheriton. This did not last long however, as Dunn was accused of paying the travel expenses of some electors, a charge which he vehemently denied, and was unseated.
- He was elected to the Legislative Council on 19 March 1869 along with John Baker, J. H. Barrow, T. English, Sir William Milne, A. B. Murray and Augustine Stow. He retired on 2 February 1877.

== Church ==
John Dunn was a member of the Wesleyan Methodist Church, and paid for the construction of the church building in Mount Barker which bears his name, opened in September 1884. He also paid for the construction of several rows of houses for the benefit of the valetudinary elderly of the district.

== Philanthropy ==
He gave to the people of Mount Barker the "Dunn Memorial Church" which was opened in September 1884, and "Dunn Park" on the occasion of his 90th birthday.

He died with an estate of around £100,000 with substantial bequests to a large number of charities, many associated with the Methodist Church and Prince Alfred College.

== The mills ==
=== Hay Valley Windmill ===
His first mill (1842) was a fixed windmill at Hay Valley, near Nairne.

=== Mount Barker ===
His second mill, a far more ambitious three-story stone mill powered by steam, was built in 1844, in steam 1 October 1844.

=== Bridgewater ===
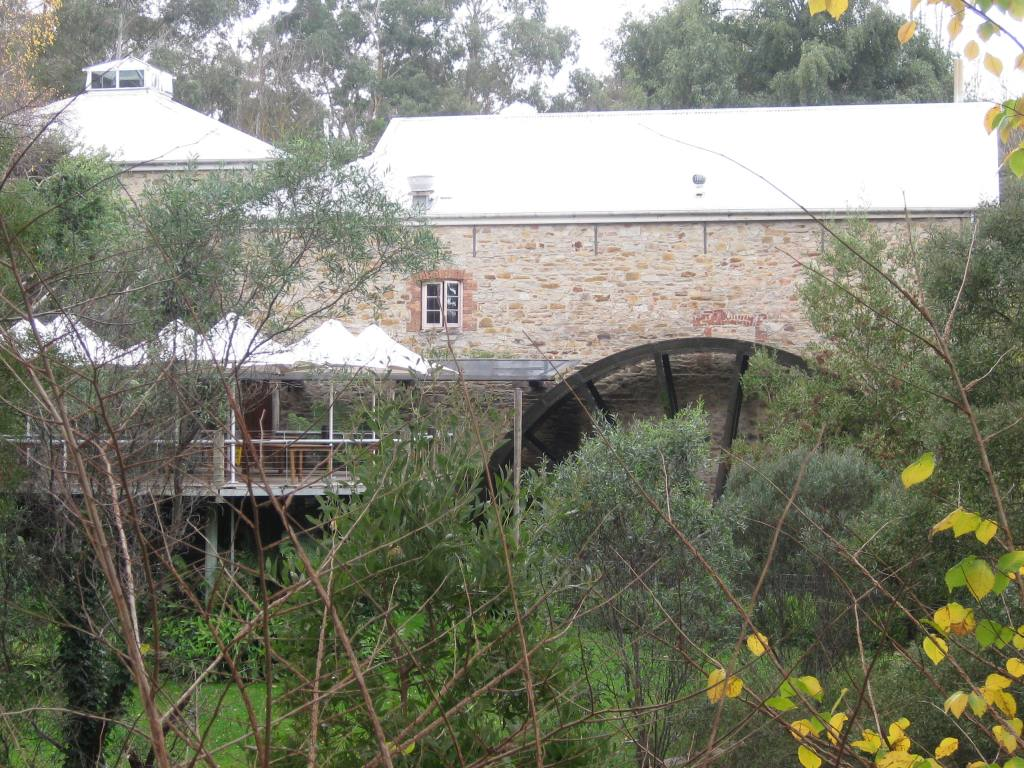
Bridgewater Mill

Around approximately 1857 Dunn bought part of section 1141 of Bridgewater to erect a steam and water mill which, for most of the year, was operated by water from Cox's Creek. In 1870 a flood washed away the mill dam, which had only recently been completed, together with the older dam and three bridges. From 1958 the mill was used as a bond store for Hamilton's Wines and is now owned by Petaluma Wines and operates as a restaurant. The building, on Mount Barker Road, is a tourist attraction; the millwheel operates electrically.

=== Port Adelaide ===
Erected by John Dunn jun. after his abortive mission to the South Seas, this steam mill went into operation early in 1866, but was burned down late that year. As this closely followed a strike followed by a lock-out, sabotage was suspected. It was rebuilt the following year. John Dunn jun. rejoined his father's company around the same time as the other family members became joint partners, and the Port Adelaide mill was acquired by the company as the price of his readmission. In 1887 the building was again destroyed by fire.

=== Second Nairne Mill (1873) ===
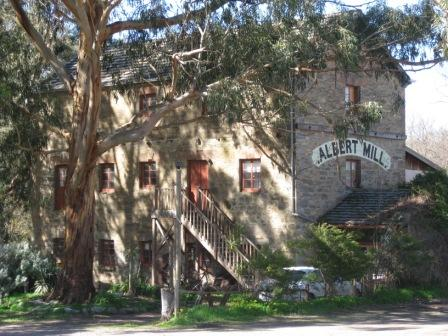
Albert Mill, Nairne, South Australia

=== Port Augusta Jetty and Mill (1880) ===
A steam mill, using all the latest technology, was installed at Port Augusta in 1880.

== Family ==
He was born the son of Charles Dunn (1770 – 17 June 1850) and Thomasin Dunn, née Hooper (1771 – 29 April 1852) who followed their children to South Australia. They were buried at Blakiston, South Australia.

He married Ann Rowe (1802 – 24 November 1870) in 1828. Their children were:

- John Dunn Jr. (1830 – 6 February 1892), born in Devon, married Elizabeth Williams (1835–1928) on 25 July 1855. She was the second daughter of John Williams, builder, surveyor and preacher of North Adelaide. They had eight children, including the architect Hedley Allen Dunn (c. 1866 – 5 June 1942), who designed the former Adelaide Stock Exchange building, built in 1901. His father married her elder sister Jane; both were born in Northam, Devon.

John had been brought into partnership with his father in 1852 but resigned in 1862 to work as a missionary in Fiji. He was forced to return in 1864 due to ill-health. On the retirement of his father in May 1889 was appointed head of the company. He served as a member of the Legislative Assembly from 1875 to 1877 and the Legislative Council from 1880 to 1888.

- Mary Ann Dunn (1832 – 9 May 1912) married William Hill (c. 1831 – 11 September 1885) on 6 April 1853, lived at "Glenara", Glenelg

- Laura Blanche Hill (1863–1957) married George Fowler Stewart in 1890

- Elizabeth Dunn (ca.1835 – 20 August 1928) married her cousin William Paltridge MP (1834 – 8 May 1890) on 24 August 1854.
- Eliza Dunn (1838 – 19 March 1856)
- William Henry Dunn (5 February 1841 – 7 July 1891), born in Nairne, married Mary Matthews (22 November 1844 – 10 June 1929) on 21 December 1865, joined the company around 1864 and retired in 1875 to farm at Pekina, South Australia. He was a member of the Legislative Assembly for Onkaparinga from 1875 to 1878.

On 27 February 1872 he married again, to Jane Cork Williams (c. 1834 – 7 June 1929), the eldest daughter of John Williams. (John Dunn Jr. had married her sister Elizabeth.)

He died at his home, "The Laurels", which was built in 1857

=== John Dunn Sr.'s siblings ===
- Charles Dunn (1796 Bondleigh, Devon – 3 June 1881 Charleston, South Australia) married Mary Ann Jasper (1801–1882) arrived in South Australia on the D'Auvergne in March 1839 and founded Charleston, South Australia
- William Henry Dunn (1797 Bondleigh, Devon – 12 April 1879 Meadows, South Australia) married Elizabeth Herd (1805–1875) they emigrated 14 December 1840 on the Fairfield
- Mary Ann Dunn (1799 Bondleigh, Devon – 4 September 1882 Mount Barker, South Australia) married Thomas Paltridge (1800–1883) they arrived on the Phoebe in March 1847.
- George Dunn (1803 Bondleigh, Devon – 19 June 1877 Mount Torrens, South Australia, Australia) married Mary Turner 4/3/1828 Devon – 1860 (jud. separation). Founder of Mt Torrens. Arrived SA aboard D'Auvergne 1839 with Charles and James ref -SA Biographical Index
- Edwin Dunn (1805 Bondleigh, Devon – )
- Richard Dunn (1806 Bondleigh, Devon – 1856 West Bromwich, Staffordshire) married Anne Podmore (1810– )
- James Dunn (1811 Bondleigh, Devon – 11 February 1862 Mount Torrens, South Australia) arrived in South Australia on the D'Auvergne in March 1839
- Samuel Dunn (31/12/1815 Devon – 24/3/1893 Devon) BDM certificate UK > married Joanna Fulford (1812– ) Son Herbert Samuel Dunn (1854–1926) died SA married Lilias Downing 1893 died in SA BDM SA
- Henry Dunn (28 April 1808 South Molton, Devon – 16 October 1891 Park Hill, Mornington, Victoria) married Mary Moor -Exeter 24/6/1838. Arrived Melbourne aboard Westminster 30/7/1841 – Vic Shipping records- married Catherine Hollet Peters (29/3/1864 Mornington – ), ref Certificates Victoria BDM
- James Dunn (1811 Bondleigh, Devon – 11 February 1862 Mount Torrens, South Australia); settled in Onkaparinga
- Elizabeth Dunn (1813 Bondleigh, Devon – 5 July 1858 Yuroke, Victoria) married William Bennett (1808–)
- Edmund Dunn (1819 Sampford Courtenay, Devon – 20 May 1891 Essendon North, Victoria) married Maria George Arrived aboard Westminister 30/7/1841 with Henry, wife Mary. Indent Victorian shipping records.

William Henry Dunn MHA, William Paltridge MHA, Herbert Charles Dunn MHA, agriculturist Charles Dunn (1796–1881) who founded Charleston, South Australia, the Rev. William Arthur Dunn, president of Prince Alfred College, architect Hedley Allen Dunn, and embezzler and arsonist Alfred Henry Dunn (c. 1845–1904) were also closely related.

== See also ==
Other flour millers of the period in South Australia include:

- William Randell
- John Darling and Son
- John Hart and Henry Kent Hughes at Port Adelaide
- Dr. Benjamin Archer Kent, for whom Kent Town, the site of his mill, was named.
- John Ridley
- Thomas Magarey, James Magarey and his son William James Magarey
- Kossuth William Duncan
- W. Thomas & Co. of Port Adelaide (William and Henry Thomas)
