= William Kay (politician) =

Australian politician

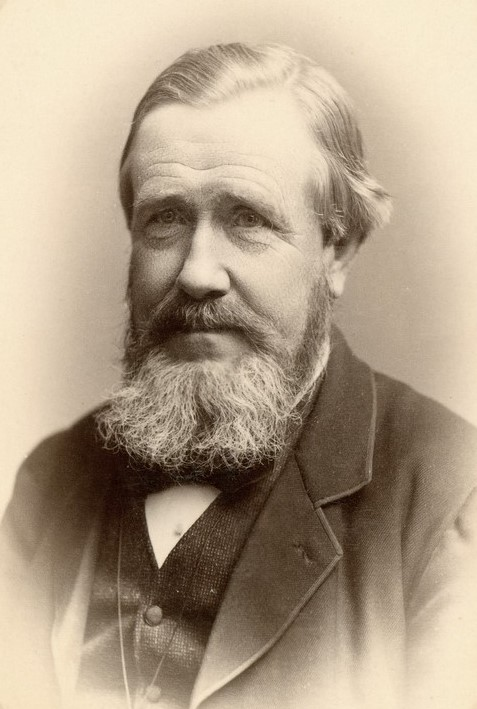

William Kay J.P. (4 July 1829 – 27 March 1889) was a businessman and politician in the early days of the colony of South Australia.

== Biography ==
William Kay J.P. (ca.1830 – 27 March 1889), was born in Newcastle on Tyne, where his father was part owner of an iron works. He emigrated to Australia, arriving in Adelaide on the Sea Queen on 25 March 1850. For some years he was in the office of George Green, for whom he acted as gold buyer, then took up a farm in Woodside, followed by a stint with the firm of Sampson, Wicksteed, & Co., auctioneers, before helping establish the firm of Townsend, Botting & Kay with William Townsend, M.P. and F. J. Botting. In 1869 he quit this company to act as agent for several absentee property owners.

He was elected to the House of Assembly for the seat of East Adelaide in 1875, and was an able representative, but did not stand at the following elections in 1878.

He occupied a very prominent position in financial circles in Adelaide. He was a valuator for the Savings Bank of South Australia, director of the English, Scottish, and Australian Chartered Bank, of the Mercantile Marine Insurance Company, of the Mortgage Company of South Australia, of the Trustees Executors and Agency Company, and of the Australian Mutual Provident Society. He also served the public in honorary capacities, such as the Board of Management of the Adelaide Hospital, and was one of that hospital's Commissioners of Public Charity, holding that position from when the commission was established. He was for four years a Visiting Justice to the Dry Creek Labour Prison, and took an active part in the management of the Deaf, Dumb, and Blind Asylum from the time of its establishment. He was attorney for several absent colonists, including Sir Arthur Blyth, C.B., K.C.M.G.; while he was Agent-General for South Australia in London, Neville Blyth, Thomas Cox, and others. He was also a trustee in several important estates. He established the Exchange Land Company to build a new Stock Exchange in Pirie Street. Other members were J. Fisher, M.L.C, G. Dutton Green, James Hill, J. C. Lovely, H. Rymill, F. Rymill, H. L. Vosz, and W. H. E. Vosz.

He was a member of the Adelaide Unitarian Christian Church, and its secretary when the Wakefield Street church building was constructed.

== Family ==
He was married, with four sons: Edward (ca.1854 – 16 October 1834)(with Elder, Smith and Co.) R. N. Kay (Mortgage Company of S.A.), Herbert (South British Mercantile Insurance Company), and F. W. Kay (in his father's office) — and four daughters. His eldest daughter Annie Kay ( – 22 June 1890) was superintendent of the Unitarian Sunday School; another daughter Katharine married Spencer A. Hall, son of James John Hall, on 28 January 1909, and his youngest daughter Emily married Edward J. Glyde, son of William Dening Glyde, on 10 July 1903.

William Kay's brother Robert Kay (1825–1904) followed him to South Australia in 1851, also briefly farmed at Woodside (perhaps together) and was a member of the same church. He became general director and secretary of the State Library of South Australia, South Australian Museum and Art Gallery of South Australia.
