= Scinema =

Australian science film festival

The SCINEMA International Science Film Festival is an Australian film festival celebrating international science-related drama and documentary films. The festival was founded with the aim of forging links between the sciences and the arts. SCINEMA accepts entries from all over the world. It is a program of Australia's Science Channel, operated by the Royal Institution of Australia.

== History ==
The festival was founded in 2000 by Rebecca Scott and Damian Harris, with the aim of forging links between the sciences and the arts. The inaugural edition took place at the Center Cinema in Canberra in 2001, hosted by CSIRO.

In 2005, the director of the festival was Chris Kennedy, of the CSIRO. In that year, films covered diverse topics, including the history of asbestos, the use of lithium for psychiatric conditions, the evolution of beer, and, from Melbourne filmmaker Klaus Toft, a film about the relationship between orcas and humans in Killers in Eden.

After a hiatus from 2014 to 2015, the Royal Institution of Australia took over hosting the festival. The 2016 festival received over 1,300 submissions from over 80 countries, with 240 screenings around Australia and one on the Davis Station in Antarctica.

In 2017, the festival hosted 317 events around Australia, involving more than 37,000 people participants.

Owing to the COVID-19 pandemic in Australia from 2020, live screenings were limited, but streaming screenings attracted over 100,000 viewers.

== Description ==
The festival also hosts a community screening program as part of National Science Week, where community groups and schools can register to run their own screening program.

== Reception ==
One reviewer said of the 14th edition of the festival in 2017: "The most noticeable thing about the films is that, collectively and individually, they are less explicitly about science and more about us. These are very human stories about how we engage with the world — with the things in it, and with each other."

== Award-winners ==
Film title	Filmmaker	Year	Category Won
OWSIA (Darkened Water)	Alireza Dehghan	2017	Best Film
Fix and Release	Simon Dobson (Canada)	2017	Best Documentary
Einstein-Rosen	Olga Osorio (Spain)	2017	Best Short Film
The Purple Plain	Kim Albright	2017	Best Director
Think Like a Scientist: Natural Selection in an Outbreak	Nathan Dappen and Neil Losin (US)	2017	Best Experimental/Animation
Nex	Philipp Buschauer, Michael Loithaler and Marlene Raml (Austria)	2017	Award for Technical Merit
Pangolins in Peril: A Story of Rare Scales	Muhammad Ali Ijaz (Pakistan)	2017	Award for Scientific Merit
Test Tube Babes	Alice Wade	2017	Special Jury Award
MARATUS	Simon Cunich (Australia)	2016	Best Film
Hilleman – A Perilous Quest to Save the World's Children	Donald Mitchell (US)	2016	Best Documentary
The Amazing Life Cycle of the European Eel	Sofia Castello y Tickell (UK)	2016	Best Short Film
Metamorphosis of Plants	Urszula Zajączkowska (Poland)	2016	Best Experimental/Animation
Corpus	Marc Héricher (France)	2016	Award for Technical Merit
Wonders of Life – Size Matters	Paul Olding (UK)	2016	Award for Scientific Merit
Stem Cell Revolutions		2013	Best Film
Clouded Leopard Kill		2013	Best animation
Night of the Crysal Mutants	Animator and sound by Dr Claire Pannell	2013	Best Experimental
Critical Thinking Series	James Hutson	2013	Best short film
The Measure of Things	Series directed by Mike Cunliffe	2013	Award for Technical Merit
Into The Gyre (USA)	Director: Scott Elliot Producer: Scott Elliot	2012	Best Film
Out of Our Minds (USA)	Director: Director Kate Webbink	2012	Best Director
Centrefold (UK)	Director: Ellie Land Producer: Siobhan Fenton	2012	Best Animation
Coffee Ring Effect (USA)	Director & Producer: Kurtis Sensenig	2012	Best Experimental Film
Reflector (USA)	Director: Dave Hill	2012	Best Short Film
Robot Quadrators Perform the James Bond Theme (USA)	Director: Kurtis Sensenig	2012	Award for Technical Merit
The Polar Explorer (Canada)	Director: Mark Terry	2012	Award for Scientific Merit
Australia: A Time-Travellers Guide (Australia)	Director: Richard Smith Executive Producer: Chris Hilton for Essential Media and Entertainment	2012	Best Television Series
The Lightbulb Conspiracy	Director: Cosima Dannoritzer Producers: Alexandre Piel and Joan Ubeda	2011	Best Film
The City Dark	Director: Ian Cheney	2011	Best Director and Award for Technical Merit
Wonders of the Solar System	Producer: Paul Olding	2011	Award for Scientific Merit
Where the wild things were	Director: Amber Cherry Eames	2011	Award for Cinematography
Do you know what time it is?	Director Paul Olding	2010	Award for Scientific Merit
Honeybee Blues	Stefan Moore	2010	Festival Director's Award
Whatever! The Science of Teens	D. L. Faber, D. Ortega, A Delaney.	2010	Best Television Series
[null Breu]	D. Jeronimo Rocha.	2010	Award for Technical Merit.
An Eyeful of Sound	Canada, Netherlands, UK. D. Samantha Moore.	2010	Best Animated Film
Nano You	Spain, UK. D. Tom Mustill.	2010	Best Short Film
How Kevin Bacon Cured Cancer	D. Annamaria Talas.	2010	Best Film
Sheep thing + Ladder = One	Nicholas Kallincos	2001	Best Student Film
Archmede (Mad Cow)	Ex Nihilo	2001	Award for Excellence in Science
Atom Bond - The Atom with the Golden Electron	Classroom Video	2001	Award for Most Innovative Film
Silent Sentinels	ABC-TV Science Unit	2001	Best Environmental Film
Australia: Eye of the Storm	ABC TV - Natural History Unit	2001	Best Film
