= Jim Hill =

Jim Hill may refer to:

- Jim Hill (racing driver) (1888–1962), American auto racer
- Jim Hill (broadcaster) (born 1946), American sportscaster and former NFL player
- Jim Hill (Oregon politician) (born 1947), attorney, financial consultant, and politician from the U.S. state of Oregon
- Jim Hill (Alabama politician) (born 1950), member of the Alabama House of Representatives
- Jim Hill (Hillsboro politician), member of the Oregon House of Representatives from Hillsboro
- Jim Hill (runner) (born 1961), American cross-country runner
- Jim Hill (swimmer), Scottish swimmer
- Jim Hill (writer) (active 1986), British television writer for The Bill
- Homeland Security Agent Jim Hill, fictional character in the television series 24, portrayed by Carl Edwards

== See also ==
- James Hill (disambiguation)
- Jim Hill High School, public high school located in Jackson, Mississippi
- Jim Hill Mountain, a peak in Chiwaukum Mountains, Washington
- Jim Hilles (born 1936), American football player and coach
- Jimmy Hill (disambiguation)
- Hill (surname)
