= H. E. Fuller =

Australian architect

Henry Ernest Fuller (13 August 1867 – 18 February 1962), generally known as H. E. Fuller, was an Australian architect, artist, and art critic in South Australia.

== Early life and education ==
Henry Ernest Fuller was born in Adelaide, a son of Henry Robert Fuller (1825–1905), mayor of Adelaide 1866–1869 and member of both houses of state parliament.

He was educated at Hahndorf College and Prince Alfred College. He later studied at the School of Design in Adelaide.

== Career ==
=== Architecture ===
He was articled to architect Isidor George Beaver for four years from 1884, and on graduating worked for the firm of Wright, Reed, & Beaver as a draftsman, then with architect E. H. Bayer. He took a year off to study at Adelaide's School of Design.

In 1891 he was appointed chief draftsman for Alfred Wells. In 1896 he went into practice on his own account, collaborating with Hedley Allen Dunn on a design for the new YWCA building (not adopted) in 1899, and the Adelaide Stock Exchange, which was built in 1901. From 1911 to 1913 he was in partnership with Alfred Barham Black.

=== Art ===
Fuller was also prominent in Adelaide's art scene. He was a fellow of the S. A. Society of Arts, its treasurer from 1897 to 1921, and secretary from 1921 to 1947. He was art critic for Adelaide's Advertiser, from 1931 to 1952, succeeded by Elizabeth Campbell, who wrote as Elizabeth Young, her name prior to her marrying Robert Campbell, director of Adelaide's National Gallery.

== Personal life ==
He was a by religion an Anglican, and served the church as secretary of the Church of England Sunday School Union, a member of the synod and of the standing committee.

He was also South Australian secretary for the Trinity College Musical Examinations in London.

== Works ==
- Dunn and Fuller won the design competition for the Stock Exchange Building, built in 1901.
- Black and Fuller designed Stage One of Ruthven Mansions, completed in 1912. The second stage was completed in 1914. Ruthven Mansions, on Pulteney Street, Adelaide, provided luxury accommodation and technological advances such as a central vacuuming system, mechanical ventilation and electric lifts.
- Fuller designed St. Oswald's Church of England and rectory at Parkside, and the Parkside Institute (c.1923).
- He designed Sir William J. Sowden's residence "Castlemaine" in Victor Harbor.
- He was co-author (with Mary A. Overbury, and edited by Sir William Sowden) of A History of the S.A. Society of Arts Inc. 1856–1931

== Organisations ==
- Fuller was a member of the South Australian Institute of Architects (SAIA); elected a Fellow in 1907 and served as Hon. Treasurer in 1907 and President from 1913 to 1915.
- He was Secretary of the Church of England Sunday School Union.
- He was the local secretary for the Trinity College of Music Examinations.
- He was a prominent member of the South Australian Society of Arts; its President 1934–1935; Secretary briefly in 1898, then 1921–1947. He also served as Treasurer for 24 years.

== Family ==
Fuller married Margaret Jessie Sunter (died 14 October 1951) on 10 January 1893; they lived at "Lauriston", Kent Town, then "Lauriston", Eastwood. Their children were:

- Basil Fuller (21 October 1893 – ) served with 10th Battalion, 1st A.I.F., wounded and leg amputated. Married Clarice Isobel Sinclair on 15 October 1919.
- Charles Alan "Charlie" Fuller (6 October 1895 – 4 December 1915) killed at Gallipoli.
- Isabel Fuller (9 October 1899 – )
