= T. W. Boehm =

German-Australian teacher

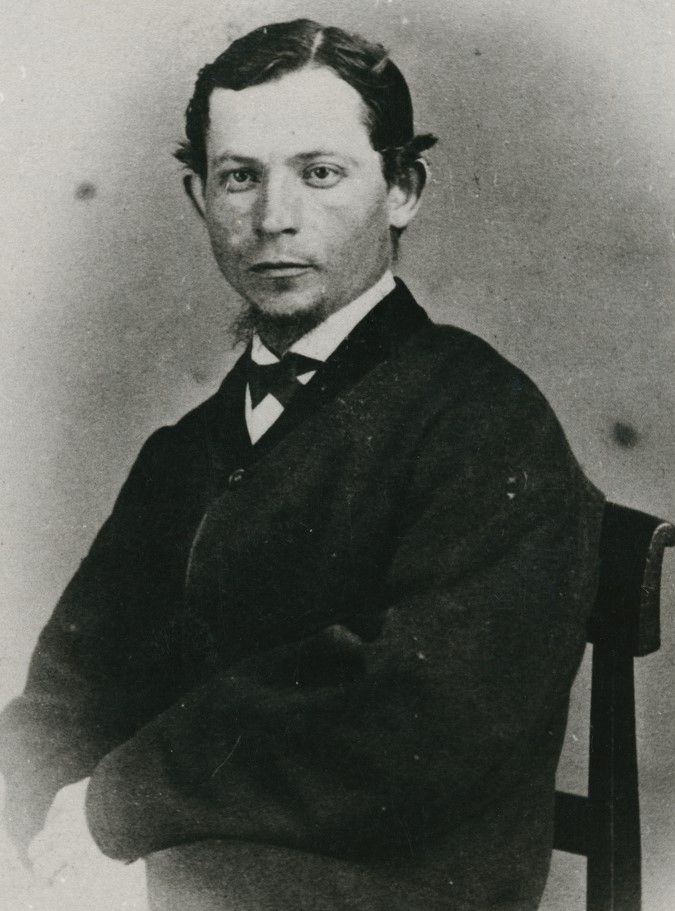

Traugott Wilhelm Boehm (18 October 1836 – 12 May 1917) was a schoolmaster, founder of the German School in Hahndorf, South Australia, which became Hahndorf Academy then Hahndorf College.

== History ==
Johann Georg Boehm, his wife Caroline née Koenig, and their family which included Boehm, emigrated from Germany, arriving at Port Adelaide on Zebra on 2 January 1839, and helped found the town of Hahndorf. Boehm was educated at the local Old Lutheran Church school, then from around 1849 undertook further training with the aim of becoming a teacher; first under Pastor Gothard Daniel Fritzsche (20 July 1797 – 2 November 1863) at the Old Evangelical Lutheran Church, Löbethal, then at Bethany and at Tanunda under Carl Wilhelm Ludwig Muecke (16 July 1815 – 4 January 1898). He began teaching at the Hahndorf Lutheran church school in 1854.

In 1857 he opened a private school in his home, criticised by fundamentalist Lutherans for his use of secular textbooks as well as the traditional Bible and catechism. In this he may have been influenced by Muecke, who also ran into antagonism from conservative Lutherans, who considered him a dangerous liberal.

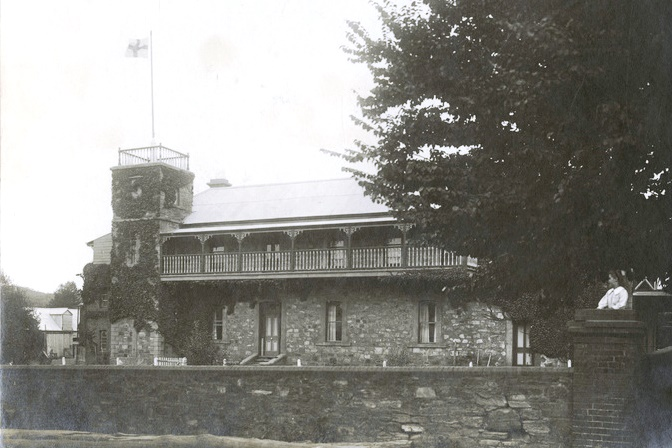
Hahndorf College building c. 1886

The school was highly successful, and from 1870 was called the "Hahndorf Academy", and in 1871 a new building was erected, single-storey at first, then a second floor and a tower were added. In 1874 the government grant of £70 per annum came to an end, and in 1877, unable to meet expenses, he sold the school at a loss to the Lutheran Church for £700. Boehm was retained as principal, and in 1879 the school was renamed "Hahndorf College". though the old name persisted somewhat. After some disputes with the Church, Boehm in 1883 bought back the school, but was forced by insolvency to close it in 1884. In 1886 he sold the building to D. J. Byard, an Oxford-educated Germanophile, who ran it after the same tradition until 1912 when it closed.

Boehm moved to Murtoa, Victoria, where he founded a private school in 1887. It too was taken over by the Lutheran Church about 1894 and became Concordia College, which moved to Adelaide in 1904. Boehm, who had remained as music teacher, retired with his daughter to Warracknabeal, where he died in 1917.

== Family ==
Boehm married Anna Maria Dolling on 12 August 1858. They had a son and a daughter.

== Notable students ==
- Thomas Coombe (1873–1959) Australian cricketer, businessman and philanthropist
- Louis von Doussa (1850–1932), South Australian lawyer and parliamentarian
- Alfred von Doussa (1848–1926) South Australian businessman, sportsman and politician
- Henry Ernest Fuller (1867–1962) South Australian architect
- Ebenezer Teichelmann (1859–1938) New Zealand surgeon, mountaineer, photographer and conservationist
