= Jimmy Hill (disambiguation) =

Jimmy Hill (1928–2015), was a British professional footballer and sports broadcaster.

Jimmy Hill may also refer to:

- Jimmy Hill (Scottish footballer) (1872–after 1900), Scottish footballer
- Jimmy Hill (footballer, born 1935), Northern Irish professional footballer and manager
- Jimmy Hill (American football) (1928–2006), American football player
- Jimmy Hill (broadcaster, born 1989), English radio, television, and Internet personality
- Jimmy Hill (baseball) (1918–1993), Negro league baseball player

== See also ==
- James Hill (disambiguation)
- Jim Hill (disambiguation)
- Hill (surname)
