= William Paltridge =

Australian politician

- Born: Wentworth Bouchier Paltridge; Okehampton, Devon, England
- Baptised: 23 November 1834
- Died: 8 May 1890 (aged 55–56); Mount Gambier, South Australia, Australia
- Occupation: Farmer
- Spouse: Elizabeth Dunn
- Parent(s): Thomas Paltridge (1800–1883) and Mary (née Dunn) (1799–1882)
- Relatives: John Dunn Snr. (uncle and father-in-law), John Dunn Jnr. and William Dunn (brothers-in-law), John Livingston (son-in-law)

Member of the South Australian Parliament for Victoria
- In office April 1870 – July 1871

William Paltridge (1834 – 8 May 1890) was a politician in the early days of the colony of South Australia, closely linked to the Dunn family of early settlers.

== History ==
Thomas Paltridge (ca.1801 – 24 July 1883), a shoemaker, and his wife Elizabeth "Granny" Paltridge, née Dunn, (ca.1799 – 5 September 1882), a sister of John Dunn arrived at Port Adelaide, South Australia on the Phoebe from England on 27 March 1847. They had six children: Thomas, John, William, Samuel, Elizabeth (Mrs. Heanes) and Mary (Mrs. Roderick McKenzie).

William married his cousin Elizabeth Dunn (ca.1835 – 20 August 1928) on 24 August 1854. He moved to Mount Gambier in 1860 and had a farm "Compton Downs" there. Elizabeth gave birth to twin sons on 3 June 1866 at Compton Downs, daughter on 22 December 1867. Third daughter Anne (or Annie) Elizabeth Paltridge married H.F.M. Kessal on 2 October 1884.

He was a councillor for the District of Mount Gambier West for some years.

He was elected to the seat of Victoria and sat from April 1870 to July 1871, when he resigned in protest at the resources being expended in the Northern Territory.

He worked as a contractor for some years and was involved in the construction of the Kingston–Narracoorte railway in 1875–1876.

He purchased property in the region of Bourke, New South Wales and suffered great losses in the flooding of the Culgoa River around 1885. John Dunn Paltridge, who was managing this station, died 30 May 1890, three weeks after his father.

He died of pneumonia leaving three sons and four daughters.

William Paltridge's brother Thomas Paltridge Jnr. was the father of Archer Dunn Paltridge (ca.1879 – 9 March 1953), who was the father of Shane Dunne Paltridge.
