= W. Thomas & Co. =

- Founder: William Thomas and Thomas Grose
- Headquarters: Adelaide, Australia

W. Thomas & Co. was a South Australian flour milling business founded by William Thomas and Thomas Grose and carried on by William's son Henry Thomas.

== William Thomas ==
William Thomas (1838 – 21 November 1891) was born in Penzance, Cornwall, and emigrated to the Victorian goldfields in 1851, but returned to England shortly afterwards. Thomas gained employment in the mines and qualified as a mine captain. He returned to Australia aboard the Peerless in 1865, expecting to find employment in one of the copper mines active in South Australia, but working instead working for J. Dunn & Sons' mill in Port Adelaide and worked his way up to the position of managing clerk. He left Dunn in 1878 and joined his brother-in-law, Thomas Grose, as flour millers.

Thomas Grose (1837–1915) was born in St Just in Penwith, Cornwall, and at 12 years of age was working in the tin and copper mines, later in the blacksmith shop at the Levant mine. He emigrated to South Australia with his brother-in-law in 1865 and for a while worked at Robert Lindsay's engineering shop before joining with Thomas in the milling business. He was elected to the Port Adelaide Council in 1890 and was elected mayor in 1898, when he successfully pushed for a graving dock to be installed at the Port.

They returned to England, where they purchased the necessary machinery and in 1879 they commissioned R. Honey to erect a flour mill at Leadenhall Street, Port Adelaide, the third in the area.

In 1901 they purchased the five-storey mill at Port Augusta built for J. Dunn & Co. around 1875, and in 1893 fitted with the first steel roller mill in the State. The mill was destroyed by fire in 1926.

=== Family ===
William Thomas married Elizabeth Jane Grose in 1865. They had one son and two daughters, and a home on Dale Street, Port Adelaide.

== Henry Thomas ==
Henry Thomas (c. 1866 – 9 October 1928) was born at Alberton, son of William Thomas, at the time working for Dunn & Sons, millers of Port Adelaide. He was educated at King's School, Port Adelaide, and Prince Alfred College and on leaving found employment as a clerk with the Commercial Bank of South Australia. After a few years he joined the family flour milling business, and on his father's death was taken into partnership with his uncle. Two years later they expanded the business into Western Australia, including mills at Northam and Pengilly.

On the death of W. C. Harrison, one of the partners in another milling firm, Grose & Thomas acquired that business in 1907, and two years later it was formed into a company, carrying on business as W. C. Harrison & Co. His uncle died in 1915 and Henry Thomas became chairman of directors of both companies, a position he held until his death.

=== Other interests ===
Thomas was involved as director in a number of South Australian businesses, including Federal Limited (the Grosvenor Hotel), and Australian Metropolitan Life Assurance Company, Limited and chairman of directors of W. C. Harrison & Co. He was a member of a Rotary Club. He was a prominent and longtime member of the Ma!vern Methodist Church. He was also a director of the Central Methodist Mission. As a young man he was an avid cyclist and later a keen tennis player.

=== Family ===
Henry Thomas married Florence Emily Davey (1872–1922), daughter of Edwin Davey (also a miller) in 1899. Their children include:

- Dr. Marjorie Phyllis Casley Thomas (1901–) graduated MD 1927, on the medical staff of Adelaide Hospital, married Roy Frisby Smith (died 1938) in 1930.
- William Lancelot "Lance" Thomas (1903–) carried on the business of W. Thomas & Co. In 1938 was manager of the tractor department of Wigmores, Ltd., Perth.
- Harold Davey Thomas (1912–) studied Mechanical Engineering at the School of Mines, married Sheila Gwendoline Odlum in Ireland in 1935.

They had a home at Port Adelaide for about 30 years; moved to 94 Cambridge Terrace, Malvern before 1935.

He died at the Memorial Hospital
