= James Hill (actor) =

English actor and vocalist

- Died: 1817?
- Occupations: Actor and vocalist

James Hill (died 1817?) was an English actor and vocalist.

== Biography ==
Hill was a native of Kidderminster; lost his father when four years old; was educated by an uncle, and was apprenticed at the age of sixteen to a painter. After a visit to London he went to Bristol, and with some difficulty induced the managers of the theatres at Bristol and Bath to allow him to perform for a single occasion at the Bath theatre. He made his first appearance accordingly, 1 October 1796, in Bannister's part of Belville in ‘Rosina,’ a comic opera by Mrs. Brooke. His success was enough to secure him an engagement for singing parts. After he had taken lessons of the leader of the orchestra at Bath, Xamenes, and others, he became, on the introduction of Signora Storace, the pupil of Rauzzini. As Edwin in Leonard MacNally's comic opera of ‘Robin Hood’ he made, at Covent Garden, 8 October 1798, his first appearance in London, attracting little attention. He was the original Sir Edward in Thomas Knight's ‘Turnpike Gate,’ 14 Nov. 1799; Don Antonio in Cobb's ‘Paul and Virginia,’ 1 May 1800; Abdalla in T. J. Dibdin's ‘Il Bondocani,’ 15 Nov. 1800; Young Inca in Morton's ‘Blind Girl,’ 22 April 1801; Lorenzo in ‘Who's the Rogue?’ and he took other second-rate parts in musical pieces of little importance. De Mountfort, count of Brittany, in T. J. Dibdin's ‘English Fleet in 1342,’ is the last part in which he is traceable at Covent Garden, 13 Dec. 1803. At the close of the season of 1805–6, in resentment of some fancied injury, he retired into the country and disappeared. According to Oxberry's ‘Dramatic Chronology,’ Hill seems to have died in 1817 in Jamaica. Gilliland speaks of him as possessing a pleasing voice and genteel person, but wanting in sprightliness and ease of deportment, a respectable substitute for Incledon, but not in the same rank (Dramatic Synopsis, pp. 114–15).
