= James Samuel Hill =

American Civil War soldier (1845–1865)

- Born: c. 1845; Lyons, New York
- Died: April 10, 1865 (aged 19–20); Danville, Virginia
- Burial place: East Newark Cemetery; Newark, New York
- Military career
- Allegiance: United States of America; Union
- Branch: United States Army; Union Army
- Rank: Sergeant
- Units: (New York (state)) Company C, 14th New York Heavy Artillery
- Conflicts: American Civil War
- Awards: Medal of Honor

James Samuel Hill (c. 1845 – April 10, 1865) was a soldier in the United States Army during the American Civil War. He received the Medal of Honor.

== Biography ==
Hill was born in about 1845 in Lyons, New York and enlisted in the Union Army from the same town.

He served as a sergeant in Company C, 14th New York Heavy Artillery. He was awarded the Medal of Honor for action on July 30, 1864 at Petersburg, Virginia. He became a prisoner of war later in the war.

Hill died on April 10, 1865, shortly after Lee's surrender at Appomattox, and was buried in East Newark Cemetery in Newark, New York.

== Medal of Honor citation ==
Rank and organization: Sergeant, Company C, 14th New York Heavy Artillery. Place and date: At Petersburg, Va., 30 July 1864

Citation:

Capture of flag, shooting a Confederate officer who was rallying his men with the colors in his hand.

== See also ==
- List of Medal of Honor recipients
- List of American Civil War Medal of Honor recipients: G–L
