= William Dunn (South Australian politician) =

Australian politician

William Henry Dunn (5 February 1841 – 7 July 1891) was an Australian politician who represented the South Australian House of Assembly seat of Onkaparinga from 1875 to 1878.

== Family ==
William Henry Dunn was the son of John Dunn Snr. and brother of John Dunn Jnr. and brother-in-law of William Paltridge, who also were elected to the Parliament of South Australia.
