= James Hill (master mason) =

James Hill (died 1734) was a master mason in Cheltenham, England.

He rebuilt St Mary's Church, Newent in 1675–1679 with Francis Jones of Hasfield. He repaired the steeple of St Mary's Church, Cheltenham in 1693 and rebuilt the collapsed central tower of St Michael and All Angels Church, Bishop's Cleeve in 1699.
