= Bondleigh =

Village in Devon, England

Coordinates: 50°49′33″N 3°54′56″W

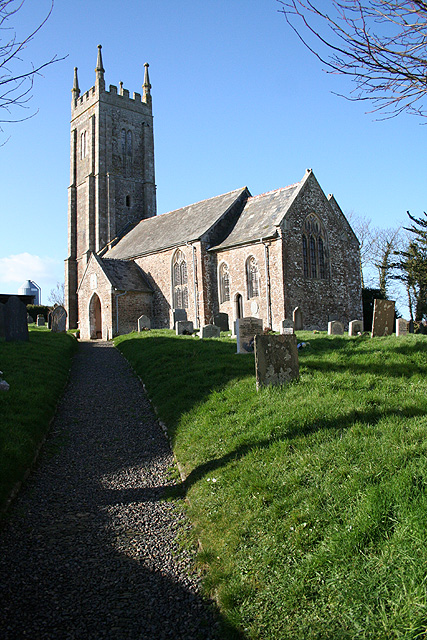
Bondleigh: St James's church.

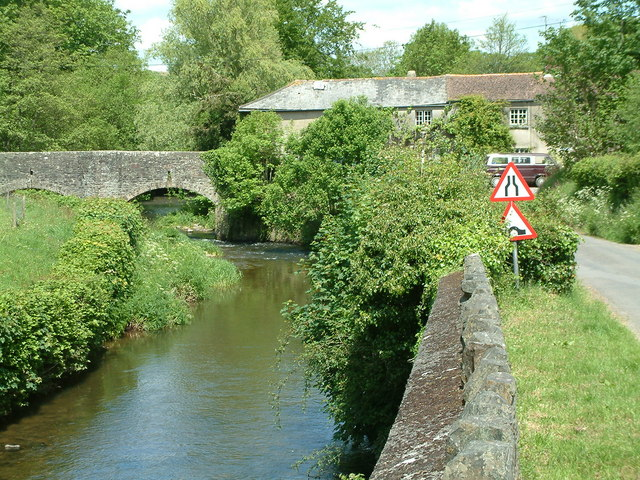
The bridge at Bondleigh, Devon.

Bondleigh is a village and civil parish in the West Devon district of Devon, England, on the River Taw, north of North Tawton. According to the 2011 census it had a population of 167.

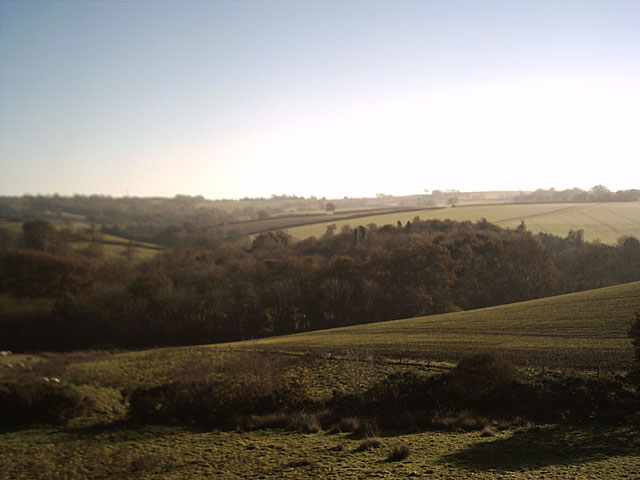
Millsome Castle from Taw Green

The parish church, is dedicated to Saint James and is grade I listed. Although it was rebuilt in the 15th century, with 16th additions, it has traces of a Norman window above the chancel, as well as other Norman features: carved stones in the walls, the baptismal font and a tympanum. There are old bench-ends, and 15th century glass. In the churchyard is the shaft of a late medieval cross made of granite which has lost its head.

A mile to the north in the parish of Coldridge is the medieval motte or ringwork known as Millsome Castle.
