= James William Hill =

American film director

James William Hill is a filmmaker. His most notable work is an independent feature entitled The Streetsweeper, about a former opera singer who gave up a promising career on the stage to support his family. It took eight years to make and was shot in San Diego.
