= James N. Hill =

American archaeologist

James Newlin Hill (1934–1997) was a prominent processualist archaeologist (a student of Lewis Binford).

Hill did most of his work in the American South West, published several papers on the Broken K Pueblo, Arizona. This study in particular has been described as "a classic example of how social organization may be reflected in the architectural segregation of pottery styles" (Sackett 1997). He believed that culture could (and perhaps should) be inferred from archaeological data.

== Biography ==
- 1957 B.A. History, Pomona College
- Three year Stint in the U.S. Navy
- 1963 M.A. University of Chicago
- 1965 Ph.D. University of Chicago
- 1965–1997 Taught at UCLA

== Works ==
- A Prehistoric Community in Eastern Arizona (1966)
- Broken K Pueblo: Prehistoric Social Organization in the American Southwest (1970 [1965])
- Individuals and Their Artifacts: An Experimental Study in Archaeology (1978)
- Pollen at Broken K Pueblo: Some New Interpretations (1968) written with Richard H. Hevly
- “Broken K Pueblo: pattern of form and function” (1968)
