= John Dunn Jr. =

Australian politician

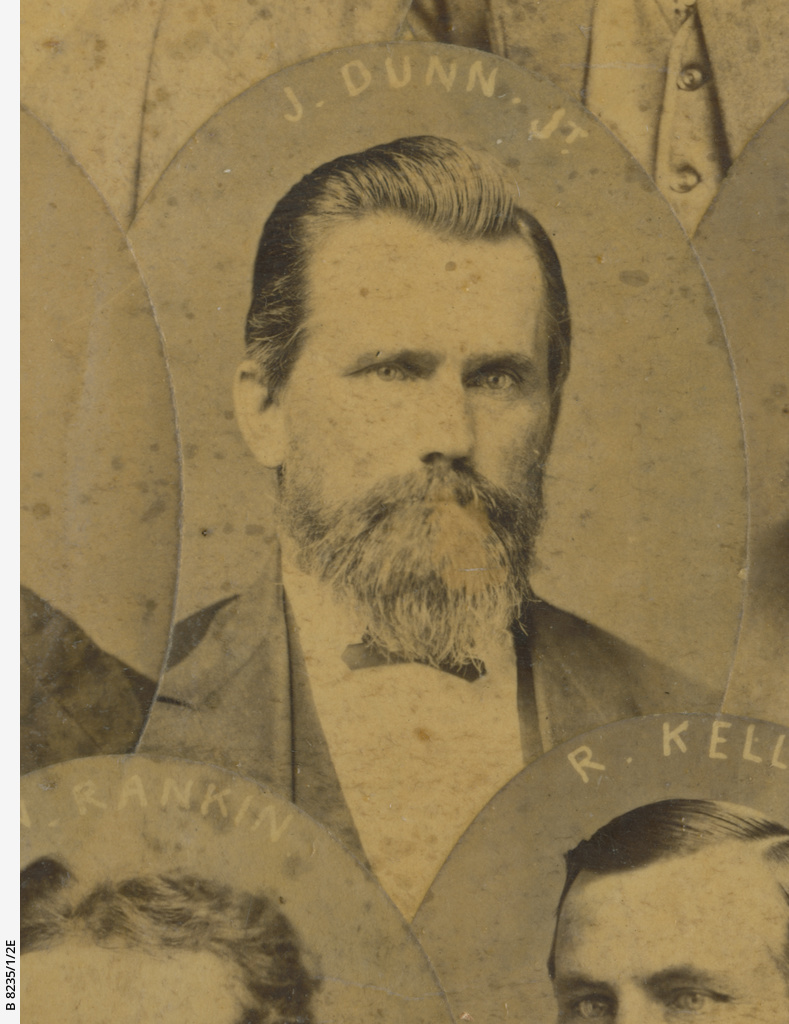
- in 1872

Personal details
- Born: John Dunn
- Spouse: Elizabeth Williams
- Parent(s): John Dunn Sr. and Anne Dunn (nee Rowe)

John Dunn Jr. (21 January 1830 – 6 February 1892), the son of John Dunn Sr. was brought into the flour milling partnership with his father in 1852, he resigned in 1862 to work as a Wesleyan missionary in Fiji but was forced by ophthalmia to return in 1864. In January 1865 the Sydney Conference removed his right to the title "Reverend", giving health problems as the reason, and against his wishes, and despite a popular petition, he was removed from the Clarendon circuit in 1865. He was later a lay preacher on the Primitive Methodist circuit.

On the retirement of his father in May 1889 was appointed head of the company; sons Frederick Williams Dunn (1863–1946), Alfred Calvert Dunn (1867–1957) and Eustace Alexandria Andrew Dunn (1869–1928) managed the company after his death.

== Politics ==
He served as a member of in both houses of the Parliament of South Australia:

- 9 June 1875 – 10 April 1878 House of Assembly member for Barossa
- 7 July 1880 – 4 May 1888 Legislative Council

== Family ==
John Dunn Jnr. married Elizabeth Williams (1835–1928), sister of his father's second wife, on 25 July 1855 at the residence of John Williams, North Adelaide, South Australia. They had fourteen children, including the architect Hedley Allen Dunn (1865–1942), who designed the former Adelaide Stock Exchange building, built in 1901.
