= William Arthur Dunn =

Reverend William Arthur Dunn
- Born: 11 March 1875; Charleston, South Australia
- Died: 30 October 1947 (aged 72); North Adelaide, South Australia
- Resting place: Payneham Cemetery, Payneham, South Australia
- Education: Prince Alfred College
- Spouse: Janet Mabel Kelly (1879 – 1962)
- Parent(s): Charles Dunn (1841–1921) and Annie née Kelly

Ecclesiastical career
- Church: Primitive Methodist; Methodist Church of Australasia
- Ordained: 1900 Kent Town
- Offices held: SA Methodist Conference: Secretary (1927) President (1929)

William Arthur Dunn (11 March 1875 – 30 October 1947) was a prominent Methodist clergyman in the colony and State of South Australia. He was president of the Methodist Conference in 1929 and president of Prince Alfred College 1930.

== History ==
William was born at Charleston, South Australia, the younger son of Charles Dunn Jr. JP (1841–1921) by his second wife Annie, née Kelly, (c. 1846–1881) who married on 2 April 1874.

His was educated at Prince Alfred College and began training as a Methodist minister in 1896 under Rev. Joseph Berry. He served as probationer at Salisbury Primitive Methodist 1896–1898 and Prospect 1898–1900, and was ordained at Kent Town in 1900. He then served at Hallett 1900–1903, Wallaroo Mines (Kadina) 1903–1906, Port Adelaide 1906–1909, East Adelaide 1910–1914, Kapunda 1914–1918 (he was so popular all the other Kapunda churches cancelled their services on the night of his farewell so their congregations might attend), Broken Hill 1918–1920, Norwood 1921–1923, Malvern 1925–1929, Kent Town 1929–1932, Pirie Street 1933–1937, and Payneham 1939–1941.

From 1906 to 1914 he was secretary of the Methodist Young People's Department and Secretary of the Methodist Conference 1927 and President of the Methodist Conference 1929.

He was President of Prince Alfred College 1930

== Family ==
- W. A. Dunn married cousin Janet Mabel Kelly (21 February 1879 – 22 June 1962), daughter of Robert Kelly (1845 – 26 October 1920) on 4 September 1901.

- Jessie Roberta Dunn (1905–1994) married Henry "Harry" Wotton (1905 – 1984) on 18 February 1933
- Dorothy Dunn (1907–1992) married Lewis Albert Dawe (1909 – ) in 1931
- Charles Dunn (1909 – ) studied for Methodist ministry
- Mary Dunn (1912 – ) served as a nurse with the AIF in Palestine
- Anne Mabel "Annie" Dunn (1916 – ) married Herbert Edwin "Bert" Rasch (1909–2006) on 15 February 1939

For more on the extensive Dunn family of early settlers see Dunn family of South Australia.
