= James Hill (merchant) =

James Hill (c. 1826 – 30 March 1901) was a businessman in South Australia, founder of James Hill & Sons, motor cycle dealers.

== History ==
Hill was a son of Rev. James Hill, an early missionary to India, where he was born. He worked for a time for Price's Candles in a management position, then around 1860 emigrated to South Australia, and opened a shop on Rundle Place in 1862 or earlier. He acted as an agent for several coastal ships, and sold bulk quantities of various goods including potatoes and wool packs.

By 1880 he had a shop on Grenfell Street, and became the South Australian agent for Crossley gas engines. He was a member of the consortium that built the Stock Exchange on Pirie Street. Hill's sons were educated at John L. Young's Adelaide Educational Institution and Prince Alfred College, and the two eldest were closely involved in the business.

By 1889 he had moved to 18 Currie Street, where in addition to Crossley engines, he sold engineering tools, ovens, refrigeration plant and Ransomes' woodworking machines. By 1892 the business had become James Hill & Sons, and had further diversified to wholesale bicycle parts and accessories, but the Crossley engine remained a staple product. They also acted as residential rental agents.

Hill died in 1901 and in 1902 his two elder sons moved the business to 63 Grenfell Street, and by 1903 were selling bicycles, Kelecom motor cycles, electric motors, marine engines, several models of Darracq motor cars, and Stevens Arms rifles. In 1914 they were selling Royal Enfield and Abingdon motorcycles and sidecars, and in 1915 first advertised Triumph motorcycles, though they had been agents for Triumph bicycles some 20 years. In another example of the firm's diversity they also stocked vacuum flasks and Duryea's "Maizena", an American cornflour. In July 1917 the business moved to 82–88 Pirie Street between Gawler Place and Chesser Street. A further move to 54–56 Hyde Street was made in March 1927, and remained the company's address in 1962.

== Family ==
Hill married Helen Farrar ( – c.1889) on 16 January 1866. (Joseph Fisher married her sister Anne Wood Farrar (died 21 April 1915) on 10 March 1857.) They had three sons and a daughter:

- Arthur Henry Hill (1866 – 18 November 1948) married Alice Haigh ( – 28 January 1929) on 7 September 1899
- Roland James "Rowley" Hill (1868 – 10 January 1929) married Mary Stuart, daughter of James Martin Stuart, Q.C. on 15 August 1900. He was a fine cricketer and Lacrosse player.
- Florence Elizabeth Hill (1870 – 6 April 1952) married Percy Brett Sands of Reigate, London on 4 June 1908.
- Herbert Edward Hill (1872 – 9 April 1940) was a solicitor in Menzies, Western Australia

They had a home, "Leahurst" or "Lea Hurst" on Avenue Road, North Adelaide.

A niece, Henrietta Ralph, married Walter Edward Dalton on 6 September 1899.
