= George Dutton Green =

South Australian businessman and politician (1850–1911)

George Dutton Green (1 May 1850 – 27 April 1911) was a land agent, auctioneer and politician in the colony of South Australia. He was generally referred to as "Dutton Green" and adopted it as his family name, occasionally hyphenated.

He was born in North Adelaide, the eldest son of George Green who founded the real-estate firm of Green & Co. on King William Street in 1848. He was educated at St. Peter's College, and in Brighton, England. He joined his father's firm in 1867, and took it over in 1871, with Colonel J. Chapman Lovely (c. 1837 – 11 November 1915) as partner, when his father retired. In 1879, supported by the Rymill brothers and several other businessmen, he established a new stock exchange (one of two competing schemes), on land known as "King's timber yard" in Pirie Street; they hired Edmund W. Wright to design, and Charles Farr to erect, the new building.

Green was a director of many notable companies: the South Australian Gas Company, the South Australian Brewing Company, John Hill & Co., the Metropolitan Brick Company, and the Glenelg Railway Company. He was a vice-president of the Park Lands League, a trustee of the Wyatt Benevolent Institution, and patron of racing clubs and athletics bodies.

He represented the electorate of East Adelaide in the South Australian House of Assembly, a colleague of John Cox Bray, from April 1884 to May 1886, when he resigned.

== Family ==
He married Constance Evelyn Charnock (3 January 1854 – 3 March 1931) on 9 February 1876, lived at "Holmfield", South Terrace, Adelaide; they had three daughters. Olive Dutton Green was a noted painter who established the Olive Dutton Green landscape prize.
