= Hedley Allen Dunn =

Australian architect and painter

Hedley Allen Dunn (27 October 1865 – 5 June 1942) was a South Australian architect, a member of the prominent Dunn family of Mount Barker. His work included the flour mill at Port Adelaide for his father and grandfather in 1886, and the Stock Exchange Building (now the Science Exchange) on McHenry Street, off Grenfell Street, Adelaide, in 1900.

== Early life and education ==
Hedley Allen Dunn was born in North Adelaide on 27 October 1865. He was a son of John Dunn, Jr., grandson of miller John Dunn who founded Mount Barker, and nephew of William Dunn, all South Australian parliamentarians.

He was schooled at Prince Alfred College for several years before attending The Leys School, a Methodist boys' school in Cambridge, England with his brother Frederick.

He returned to Australia in 1881 and studied architecture with fellow students Frank Counsell and Alfred M. Bonython; examiners included E. Davies and E. J. Woods.

== Career ==
Dunn first found employment with Ellerker and Kilburn of Melbourne, then Oakden, Addison and Kemp for whom he travelled to Auckland, New Zealand to design a health retreat at the hot springs in Waiwera.

He worked for a time in Brisbane, then returned to Adelaide, where in 1886 he opened his own practice in Freeman Street. His major project in this period was a large flour mill at Port Adelaide for his father's family business; brother Alfred Calvert Dunn was engineer. This superseded an earlier mill designed and executed by Wright, Woods & Hamilton.

In September 1887 he was taken on as partner by Edward Davies in Flinders Street, Adelaide, dissolved 1888. They produced a prize-winning design for the new Commercial Bank at 25 King William Street. Dunn designed the elaborate blackwood case for the new organ at the Kent Town Methodist Church in 1898.

His design for a building for the Royal Bank of Queensland was rejected, but they nevertheless opened a practice in Queen Street, Brisbane in 1890.

After marriage in Queensland in 1893, Dunn returned to Adelaide and opened his own offices in King William Street, working mainly on residences but was also brought in to design extensions to the Dunn Memorial Church in Mount Barker in 1899.

In 1899 Dunn collaborated with Gilbert Place architect Henry Ernest Fuller on a design for the new YWCA building (not adopted) and the Adelaide Stock Exchange on McHenry Street, for which they won both first and second prizes, and which was built in 1901. He was responsible for the new grandstand at Prince Alfred College in 1904.

Hedley at some stage joined John Alexander Dowie's Christian Catholic Apostolic Church, and in 1903 traveled to Zion, Illinois, headquarters of the sect. If he had hoped for a professional appointment he was disappointed, but impressed with what he saw.

From 1919 Dunn practised from his home at 55 East Terrace, Kensington Gardens, and retired around 1934.

He was elected a fellow of the South Australian Institute of Architects around 1897. He was a council member for the institute 1902–1903 and 1911–1912, and auditor 1904–1905.

== Other interests ==
Hedley was a keen and accomplished painter, and an Associate of the Queensland Art Society in 1894. He was an active member of the PAC Old Collegians. He sang with the Society of Arts and the Lyric Club. He was a member of the Council of Arts.

He was in 1897 elected a Fellow of the South Australian Society of Arts, and for many years served as the society's auditor. He gave several lectures to the society on the subject of domestic architecture.

His involvement with the Christian Catholic Apostolic Church extended to giving public lectures in the Federation Hall, Grote Street in the early 20th century.

== Personal life ==
Hedley married Annie Elizabeth Powis Jordan (1863 – 7 April 1936) in Queensland on 3 April 1893. Annie was the second daughter of Henry Jordan MLA, and a poet and author, and a sister of author Harry Hall Jordan (1866–1930). They had at least one son:

- Cedric Leighton Dunn (2 February 1896 – 1962) was born in Albion, Queensland; worked for the Queensland Public Works Department from 1914.

Remarkably for an architect, his home, though on a reasonably large block in a highly desirable location, was extraordinarily modest, little more than a "shack" or "weekender", in contrast to the grandiosity of "The Laurels" of his grandfather.
