= Royal Institution of Australia =

Australian scientific institution based in Adelaide, South Australia

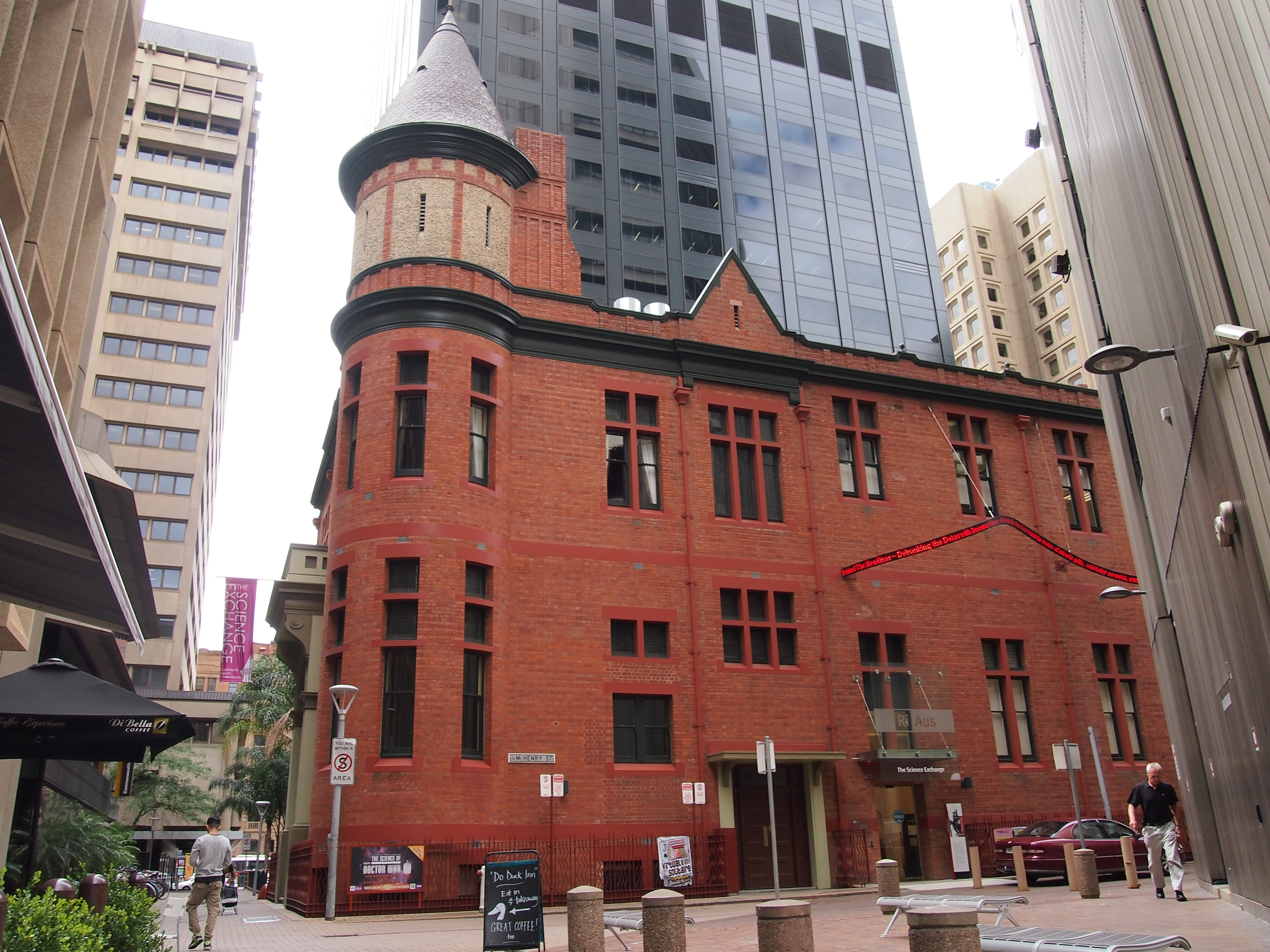
The historic Adelaide Stock Exchange building, former home of RiAus

The Royal Institution of Australia (RiAus) is a national scientific not-for-profit organisation based in Adelaide, South Australia, whose mission is science communication. It opened in October 2009 and was housed in the historic Adelaide Stock Exchange building, then known as The Science Exchange, until 2024. RiAus published the Cosmos Magazine website until February 2024, and hosted the SCINEMA International Science Film Festival. It appoints s

== History ==
The concept of a Royal Institution of Australia was proposed by Baroness Professor Susan Greenfield CBE, while she was Thinker in Residence for the South Australian Government during 2004 and 2005. Greenfield was Director of the Royal Institution of Great Britain (RiGB) from 1998 to 2010. South Australian premier Mike Rann was receptive to the idea and secured state, federal and private sector funding for the organisation, its building and programs. The Royal Institution of Australia's inaugural chairman was Peter Yates AM.

The establishment of a Royal Institution of Australia was amongst the recommendations Greenfield made during her Adelaide residency, which included initiatives to encourage collaboration and complementary research programs across South Australian universities, science communication programs for children, professional development for school teachers and the establishment of the Australian Science Media Centre. A key recommendation was the Bragg Initiative, which encouraged a relationship between South Australia and the RiGB and was taken up by the South Australian government.

The Bragg Initiative was named for William Henry Bragg and William Lawrence Bragg. This father and son team won the 1915 Nobel Prize in Physics for their "analysis of crystal structures by means of X rays". Both had an enormous passion for communicating science to the broader community. The Bragg Initiative was a program within the Department of the Premier and Cabinet managed by Linda Cooper.

In June 2008, work commenced to convert the former Adelaide Stock Exchange building, which had remained empty for many years, into The Science Exchange.

The Royal Institution of Australia was opened on 8 October 2009 by the President of the Council of RiGB, HRH Prince Edward, Duke of Kent, who would become RiAus's patron also.

The Royal Institution of Australia foundation partners were the Government of South Australia, the Commonwealth Government and oil and gas company, Santos. It has a paid membership program, including both corporate and individual members.

In February 2024, due to limited financial resources, RiAus passed management of Cosmos Magazine to CSIRO Publishing, and shortly thereafter moved from the Science Exchange building.

== Adelaide Stock Exchange Building ==
The Science Exchange

The Royal Institution of Australia was housed at The Science Exchange, a red brick building located between Pirie and Grenfell streets in the Adelaide city centre (address 53-57 Exchange Place), until 2024.

The building is the former Stock Exchange building. The Adelaide Stock Exchange was established in the colony of South Australia in 1887 by a group of financial brokers and traders, after the other capital cities had established their own stock exchanges. After trading for some time on Pirie Street, it was decided that a bigger building was required. The new building was designed by the architects Hedley Allen Dunn in collaboration with Henry Fuller in Federation/Edwardian style, with Arts and Crafts influences.

The building includes a stained glass window by Morris & Co, with three of the six panels after the designs of Edward Burne-Jones, created by the company's chief designer J.H. Dearle. The window was donated by businessman George Brookman, intended to celebrate Australian federation, although as one source noted "it in fact represents more accurately the ideal of British Empire federation". The central figure is Britannia, with a black man on and a white woman representing Africa and Canada on one side, and on the other, another woman representing Australia, alongside "an inhabitant of the King's Indian dominions". The window is one of around 20 Morris Company windows identified in Australia, of which 14 are in Adelaide.

It was opened on 6 September 1901 by the premier of South Australia John Jenkins.

The building was damaged twice by fire, in 1938 and in 1982, but the stained-glass windows survived. The stock exchange occupied the building until 1991, after which it remained vacant until 2009, when it was renovated and occupied by RiAus. Many of the original features were restored in the western end of the building, while the eastern end is in contemporary design.

The building was state heritage-listed on the South Australian Heritage Register on 8 November 1984, and is also listed by the Australian Institute of Architects among the 120 nationally significant 20th-century buildings in South Australia.

In 2024, RiAus vacated the Science Exchange building, which remains owned by the South Australian Department for Environment and Water. In September 2025, the building was leased to the Conservation Council of South Australia, and renamed "The Exchange".

== Description ==
The Royal Institution of Australia is the first and only sister organisation outside of the UK of the Royal Institution of Great Britain (RiGB).

As a national hub for science communication, the Royal Institution of Australia promotes public awareness and understanding of science. Its mission is "connecting people with the world of science". The Institution highlights the importance of science in everyday life through the Cosmos Magazine website, the SCINEMA International Science Film Festival, and the RiAus Education platform.

RiAus receives financial and in-kind support from members, corporate partners, and donors.

== Governance ==
=== Directors ===
The inaugural director of the Royal Institution of Australia was Professor Gavin Brown AO, Scottish born mathematician and former Vice Chancellor of the University of Adelaide and the University of Sydney.

After the resignation of Brown, Jane Lomax-Smith filled in as acting director (2010-2011). Paul Willis, science communicator, paleontologist, science journalist, and broadcaster was the director from 2011 until July 2017. In 2017, the RiAus appointed Bradley Abraham as CEO and director. In addition, the council appointed Alan Duffy, an astronomer and physicist at Swinburne University of Technology, as its new lead scientist.

=== Council ===
The Royal Institution of Australia is governed by a council. As of April 2024, council members are:

- Peter Yates AM, chair
- Will Berryman, also ED
- Lyn Beazley, former Chief Scientist of Western Australia
- Christian Bennett
- Gregory Clark AC
- Tony Clark, co-founder and director of Rising Sun Pictures
- Rod Eddington AO
- David Knox
- Karen Dobson
- Caroline McMillen

== See also ==
- Australian Science Media Centre
