= Anthony family =

Anthony family may refer to:

- Anthony family (Susan B. Anthony), American Quaker family, whose most notable member is Susan B. Anthony
- Anthony family (Australian politics), Australian family notable for work in politics
