= Rounsevell =

Rounsevell is a surname. Notable people with the surname include:

- Ben Rounsevell (1843–1923), Australian politician, brother of John
- John Rounsevell (c. 1836–1902), Australian pastoralist and politician
- William Rounsevell (c. 1816–1874), Australian settler and businessman
