= Robertson brothers (pastoralists) =

The Robertson Brothers, John Holland Robertson (1843–1909), William Robertson (c. 1845–1914) and Robert Robertson (1846–1928) were pioneer cattle, sheep and horse breeders of South Australia, associated with Chowilla and Bookmark/Calperum stations.

== History ==
Robert Robertson (died 9 February 1847) a sea captain, and his wife Margaret Robertson, née Harper (c. 1816 – 21 December 1898) arrived in South Australia on the Buckinghamshire in March 1839. They lived at Salisbury for a few months, then Pewsey Vale, then settled in Gawler, where they built, and from 1840 to 1844 ran, the Old Bushman Inn, relinquishing it on account of his failing health. They tried farming at Angas Park then the Lyndoch Valley, where they purchased land from the South Australian Company. They had three sons: John, William and Robert, born in Gawler, Angas Park and Lyndoch respectively. Robert Robertson died in Adelaide and the following year Mrs Robertson, whose third son was not yet two years old, advertised the farm as a working concern on a long-term lease.

In 1852 the widow Margaret Robertson married Richard Holland (c. 1805 – 25 November 1881), a well-known horse drover and recent holder of the "Turretfield" lease, near Rosenthal (now Rosedale), between Gawler and Angaston. He adopted her three sons: John, William, and Robert, aged around nine, seven and five years respectively. They were subsequently educated at John L. Young's Adelaide Educational Institution, all three becoming prize-winning students. Holland was living in the vicinity of Gawler much of this time, so it is likely Mrs Holland and the boys were renting a house in the city.

== The properties ==
=== Bookpurnong and Piapco ===
In 1863 Holland purchased the contiguous Bookpurnong and Piapco (Note: It is likely that Piapco, elsewhere mentioned as being near Moorunde, is the same area as that later known as Pyap. There is no evidence that the "co" in the closely associated leases Piapco, Qualco and Ramco stands for "Company".) pastoral leases of 489 square miles (1,270 km^{2}) from (William) Chambers & (Frederick) Blades. (Note: Charles Chambers (1843–1877) and William Chambers (1849–1930) were sons of John Chambers; Frederick James Blades (c. 1830–1895) was a son-in-law. They owned the Dragon Brewery, Green Dragon and Queen's Head hotels in the city, and the Tanner's Arms in Unley.) James Trussel was manager of Piapco in 1864. Holland appointed William Robertson as manager.

In 1873 he sold the lease, with its 22,000 sheep, to A. B. Murray for £25,000.

Archibald Henderson was manager of Bookpurnong from 1873 to around 1885. (Note: Elsewhere James Mclnnes Mackay is credited as Bookpurnong manager 1874–1875.)

Murray was forced to relinquish the lease due to the rabbit pest. (Note: This seems to conflict with the report that A. B. Murray offered 6s. 5d. and 10s. 6d. for Bookpurnong lots 270 and 271 respectively in 1889. His bids were under the reserve price however, so the lot was passed in. This may have been an accepted strategy for unloading a lease; more information is required.)

=== Chowilla and Bookmark (or Calperum) ===
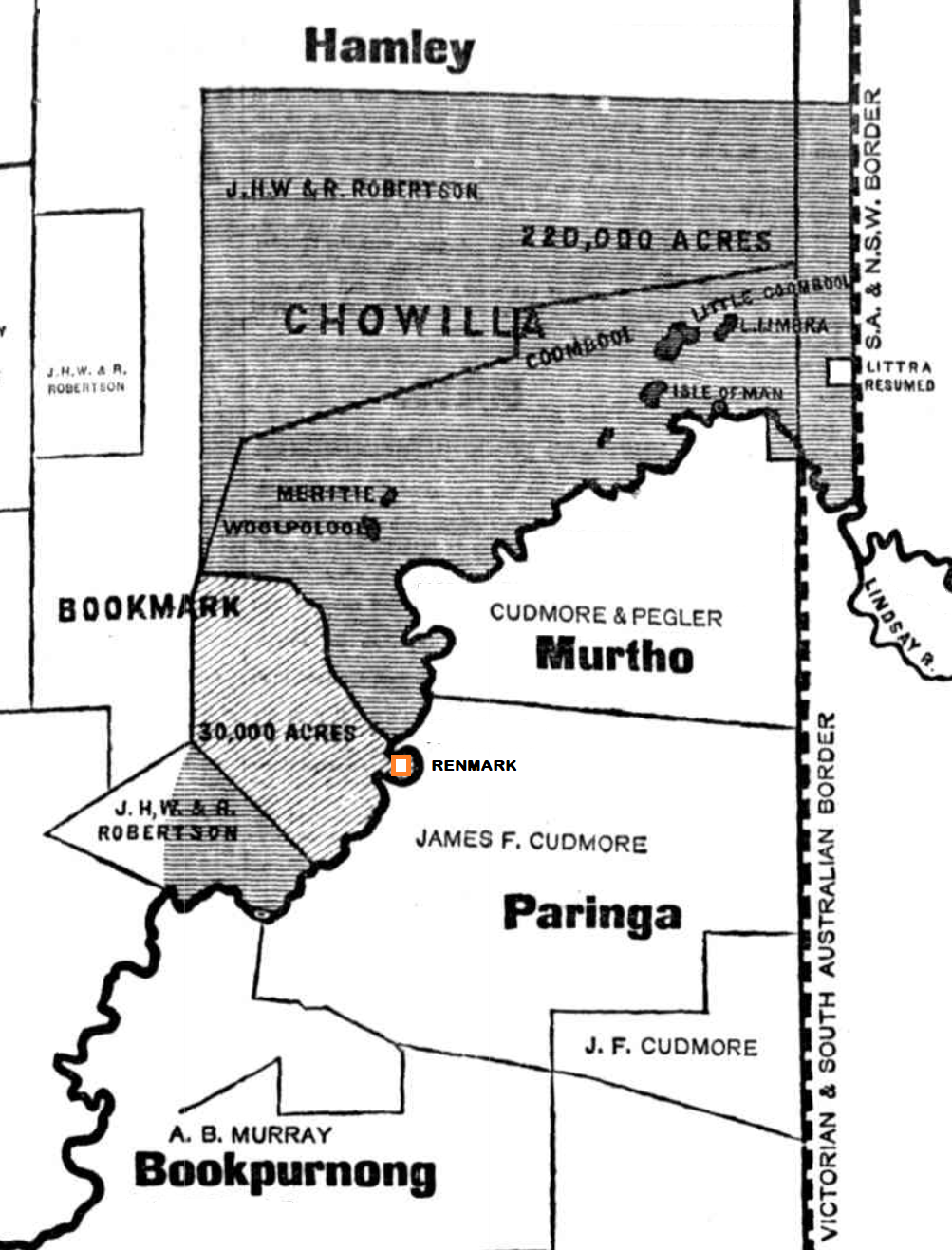
Upper Murray in 1887. The approximate location of Renmark has been added.

In 1862, James Chambers died, shortly followed by his partner William Finke (c. 1815 – 17 January 1864). Their Chowilla and Bookmark leases were taken over by John Chambers, then in 1870 or 1871 transferred to Richard Holland, who appointed William Robertson overseer and John and Robert joint managers. Robert built himself a slab hut at Bookmark, while John and William moved further north to Chowilla, building a hut on Chowilla Creek. William left for Queensland around 1873 or 1874, and in 1876 John and Robert sold their cattle holdings, having determined to concentrate on sheep. In 1887 agreement was reached by the South Australian government and Chaffey Brothers to excise 30,000 acres (12,000 ha) of Bookmark station with 6 miles (9.7 km) of River Murray frontage for their irrigation settlement and creation of a new town: Renmark, the name by which the nearby river flats had been known since 1883 or earlier.

In 1888 the partnership between John and Robert was dissolved. In 1896 the Robertson brothers ceased joint management of their two properties, Robert Robertson taking over Chowilla, and John H. Robertson taking over Bookmark, at the same time changing its name to Calperum.

Robert Robertson carried on at Chowilla until 1919, when be formed Chowilla into a company.

=== Turretfield, Kalamurina, Nickavilla, Chester Hall ===
In 1880 the brothers, with W. R. Cave, purchased Kalamurina Station near Lake Eyre.

In 1883 they purchased Nickavilla Station on the Bulloo River in Queensland from J. & D. McIvers. William was sole owner from 1890.

In 1886 they purchased Chester Hall farm from their uncle, George Harper, (Note: George Harper (c. 1814 – 10 February 1901), Margaret Robertson's brother, arrived in South Australia in May 1848 aboard the Orbona) for an annuity of £200 per annum for life. This was taken over by William in 1890.

William managed Turretfield, Nickavilla and Chester Hall properties with their attendant encumbrances until 1900, when he was forced to abandon them.

In 1908 Turretfield was sold to the South Australian Government for agriculture research, and is now part of the SARDI. The original house still stands at Holland Road, Rosedale, South Australia 5350

== Richard Holland ==
Richard "Dick" Holland (c. 1805 – 25 November 1881) was born in New South Wales, and was the founder of "Turretfield" racehorse stud.

One of his horses, Australian Buck, won the 1872 Adelaide Cup, and "The Assyrian" (formerly "Rothschild") won the 1882 Melbourne Cup.

== The brothers ==
=== John Holland Robertson ===
John Robertson (15 January 1843 – 20 January 1909) was born in Lyndoch and was educated first at Mr Burton's school, Gawler, (Note: St George's School run by Leonard Samuel Burton (c. 1823 – 23 February 1895). Burton, who was mayor of Gawler 1884, 1885 and 1888, was killed in a railway accident.) and later at John L. Young's Adelaide Educational Institution, winning prizes in June 1859, December 1859, and June 1860.

By 1872 he had adopted "Holland" as his middle name. In the 1870s John was manager of Turretfield's cattle raising venture, and with his two brothers carried on the Turretfield Stud in succession to Mr Holland, and bred many successful racehorses. Stud horses owned by the brothers include Moonlight, who won Wentworth cups in 1877 and 1879, Australian Buck, of the 1872 Adelaide Cup, Neighbour, and Six Shooter, who sired many good horses; Valkyrie was one of their best mares.

Nickavilla was the name of John's house in Childers Street in 1886. He took a keen interest in sport, and was recognised as a crack rifle and pigeon shot, winning many trophies with his guns. He was well known all along the Murray, and particularly at Renmark and was much esteemed for his hospitality and kindly nature. As a hobby he made violins, at which he was an adept.

He was a prominent member of the Royal Agricultural Society.

John Holland Robertson held the Calperum lease from 1896 until his death in 1909, the property remaining in the family until the death of the last daughter in 1953.

Family

John Holland Robertson of Bookmark/Calperum station, married Ellen "Nellie" Rees George (c. 1853 – 3 June 1948) on 22 January 1878. Ellen Rees George was a sister of educationist Madeline Rees George. They had four daughters:

- Ellen Margaret Robertson (18 December 1878 – ) married Frederick William Harris ( – ) of Sydney, New South Wales, on 25 January 1916.
- Madeline "Madge" Robertson (30 January 1881 – 14 March 1848) married Charles Ansell Lushington "Charlie" Morant ( –1966), of Walteela Station, near Renmark, on 28 April 1908. Charles was the eldest son of Colonel C.M.A. Morant (c. 1845–1911).
- Marian Rosina Robertson (29 November 1882 – 11 March 1952) married Charles Edgar Turner (c. August 1887 – 1957) on 30 June 1914. They divorced in 1921; she married again, to (John) Webb Warren (1878–1937), manager of Calperum Station.
- Juliet Hope Robertson (3 June 1886 – 1958) married Douglas Lockhart Smith ( – 1962) on 25 November 1913

=== William Robertson ===
William Robertson ( – 24 September 1914) and his brothers moved to Turretfield when their mother married Richard Holland. Like his brothers, he was educated at Adelaide Educational Institution, winning prizes at ceremonies in June 1860, December 1860, June 1861, December 1861, June 1862, December 1862.

William was involved in his stepfather's racehorse breeding business. He was a partner with his brothers in Chowilla and Bookmark stations, and was regarded as one of the leading sportsmen of the Wentworth district, where apart from his racetrack successes he was known as an excellent shot.

He had a business partnership with W. R. Cave. Cave's son Tom was drowned in 1886 while holidaying at Chowilla.

He persuaded his brothers to invested in Kalamurina Station, near Lake Eyre, with W. R. Cave, and took it over when the partnership dissolved. He bought out Cave's interest in 1897.

He bought out his brothers' interest in Chester Hall farm in 1890. In 1897, as his financial position deteriorated, he transferred it to his wife, a subject of Supreme Court action by the Union Bank of Australia after he was declared insolvent.

In 1890 he took over Nickavilla Station, Queensland, managed by J. Gordon Fraser, but a series of poor seasons left him financially stretched and was resumed by the bank in 1899 and Turretfield was resumed by its mortgagees and he moved to Netherby. He was declared insolvent in 1902.

He and W. R. Cave were part of the committee charged with selecting horses for the Boer War.

He was member of the Adelaide Racing Club, where he was known as "Willie Robertson", and chairman from December 1892 to 1902.

When Turretfield was broken up he retired to "The Gunyah", Wilmington, where he ran a small stud based on his mare Tinmine and her daughters Tinfoil, Stannine and Stannary Hills, from which he bred The Tinman, Tinbrook, Humberette and Dardurr. He was an active promoter of the racing clubs of the north, and was an early advocate of paid stewards on race courses. His last years were marred by the after-effects of breaking his leg in a trap accident.

Family

He married Blanch Scott ( – 14 March 1934) of Wilmington on 23 April 1886. They had two daughters:

- Margaret Robertson (1887–1968) married Frank Compson Daw (1881–1963) on 6 October 1910
- Nell Hope Robertson (1892 – 10 September 1913) died of pneumonia.

=== Robert Robertson ===
Robert "Bob" Robertson (5 November 1846 – 16 December 1928) was born in Lyndoch and educated at Adelaide Educational Institution, winning prizes in December 1860, June 1861, June 1863, December 1863, June 1864.

Although he never learned a trade, was remarkably handy with tools and carpentry work. He did all the joinery, roofing, and other woodwork at both Chowilla and Bookmark, and like his brother, was famous for instrument-making, having made three cellos and a violin. The cabin of his son W. A. Robertson's motorboat Lotus was also his handiwork.

Robert has won many trophies in Melbourne and elsewhere with his Purdey gun. Using his rifle shot he won a match at Smithfield, despite using the left shoulder— as his right was blackened while practicing.

Family

Robert Robertson, later of Chowilla station, married Adelaide Mary Harvey (1859–1950) of Blanchetown, on 14 November 1878. Among their children were:

- William Arthur Robertson (1879–1954) married Marjory Mary Compson Daw ( – ) on 18 April 1914, lived at Chowilla. Their son Lewin took first honours at Roseworthy College.
- Robert "Robbie" Robertson (1881–1944?) married Isidore Claire Dale (1888–1975) on 9 December 1912, moved to Condoblin district
- J(ohn) Harper Robertson (1883–1968), electrical engineer and winemaker, married Elizabeth Florence "Betty" Waters (1883 – 30 November 1962) in London on 16 June 1905, lived at "Glenloth", O'Halloran Hill

- (Colin) Scott Robertson (1912– )

- (Adelaide) Mary "Della" Robertson (1884–1957) married F(rederick) Cyril Lang (1892–1965), of "Wiela", Murthoo, via Renmark on 29 April 1922
- Douglas Robertson (1887 – 1953? 1966?) married Alice Ada Cowell (1887–1975) on 29 August 1918, lived at "Ockley", Nuriootpa
- Kathleen Robertson (1891–1983) married Desmond Theodore Du Rieu ( –1969) on 4 March 1924, lived at "Lagonda", Twenty-eighth street, Renmark.

== See also ==
- Bowman brothers
- Chambers brothers
