= Ben Rounsevell =

Australian politician (1843–1923)

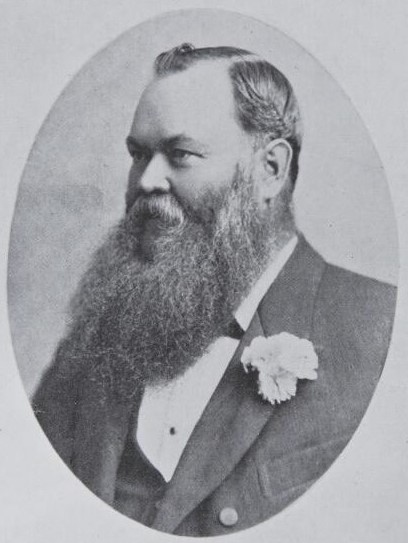

Member of the South Australian House of Assembly for Burra
- In office 16 February 1875 – 8 April 1890

Member of the South Australian House of Assembly for Port Adelaide
- In office 8 April 1890 – 14 April 1893

Member of the South Australian House of Assembly for Burra
- In office 29 April 1899 – 2 May 1902

Member of the South Australian House of Assembly for Burra Burra
- In office 3 May 1903 – 2 November 1906

Personal details
- Born: 23 September 1843 Adelaide
- Died: 18 July 1923 (aged 79)

William Benjamin Rounsevell (23 September 1843 – 18 July 1923), known as "Ben" or "Big Ben", was a South Australian politician. He was a member of the South Australian House of Assembly from 1875 to 1893 and from 1899 to 1906, representing the Burra and Burra Burra seats for all but one term, when he held Port Adelaide. He was Treasurer of South Australia four times: from May to June 1881 under William Morgan, from 1884 to 1885 under John Colton, from January to June 1892 under Thomas Playford II and from 1892 to 1893 under John Downer. He also served as Commissioner of Public Works from 1890 to 1892 under Playford, and again in the seven-day Solomon Ministry of 1899. His brother, John Rounsevell, was also a South Australian politician.

== Early life ==
Rounsevell was born in Pirie Street, Adelaide, son of William Rounsevell and his second wife Mary, née Palmer. W. B. Rounsevell was educated at Whinham College, followed by St Peter's College. He picked up the rudiments of bookkeeping and office work under William Kay in the offices of auctioneers Townsend, Bouting and Kay, then began working for his father's coach and mail business where his brother John was already employed. The two were called by the men "Master John" and "Master Ben". John was in charge of the roads north of Kapunda, while Ben had Yorke Peninsula and the southern routes. When the business was sold in 1868 to Cobb & Co., Ben retained a share in the company.

One of his first business ventures, in conjunction with his half-brother John, was to supply tens of thousands of wooden sleepers for the new railway to Burra, South Australia.

Rounsevell claimed to be the first to run a plough on Yorke's Peninsula, back in his father's stage-coach days, at Green's Plains. He was then also in charge of farming hay at Glenside, and elsewhere.

Returning to South Australia after an extended stay in Britain, he began farming at his property, Corryton Park, and was one of the first in the State to use superphosphate, with excellent results, though only on his garden. He often expressed regret that he hadn't used the chemical to increase his wheat yield. It remained for Professor Lowrie to prove its application to South Australian farming, though Jack Cudmore had used "super" on Yorke's Peninsula with excellent results. For a time he owned Moolooloo and Coxare (?) stations, stocked with cattle that he bred at Corryton. He bred his own bulls from pedigree Shorthorns and his own rams from stock be bought from the Murrays. In later years he concentrated on Jersey cattle he bought from Victoria then from A. J. Murray at Mount Crawford. He imported Lincoln sheep, Australia's first Indian Runner ducks, pheasants, partridges and hares.

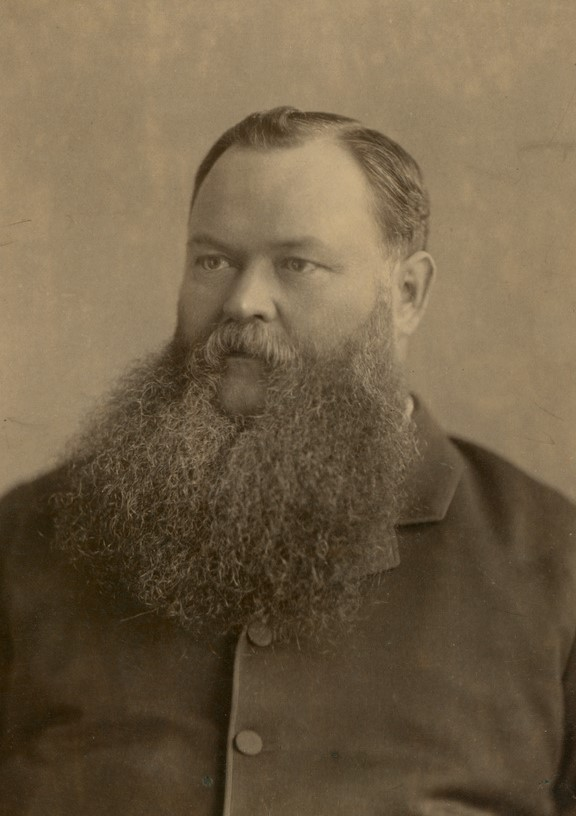

Rounsevell purchased the wine and spirit business of Johnston, Furness and Blakeney, which he later sold to the South Australian Brewing Company which also took over the brewing businesses of W. K. Simms and Sir Edwin Smith.

== Political career ==
After his father's death Rounsevell moved to Burra, he was elected to the South Australian House of Assembly for Burra on 16 February 1875, which he held until 8 April 1890 when he was elected to the seat of Port Adelaide, holding that seat until 14 April 1893. From 29 April 1899 he again represented Burra, holding the seat until 2 May 1902 when it was abolished; from 3 May 1903 until 2 November 1906 he held the new seat of Burra Burra.

Rounsevell served as Treasurer of South Australia under William Morgan from 10 May 1881 to 24 June 1881; under Sir John Colton from 16 June 1884 to 16 June 1885 (when he introduced land and income taxes), and under Thomas Playford II from 6 January 1892 to 21 June 1892 and under John Downer from 15 October 1892 to 12 May 1893.

Rounsevell was Commissioner of Public Works from 19 August 1890 to 6 January 1892 under Playford, when he introduced the Happy Valley reservoir scheme. Rounsevell was again Commissioner of Public Works briefly from 1 to 8 December 1899 in the eight-day ministry of Vaiben Louis Solomon when he purchased the Holdfast Bay Railway Company for the State.

== Family and other interests ==
He was a longtime member of the Royal Agricultural and Horticultural Society and its president from 1911 to 1912.

He was a director and for many years chairman of the firms Colton, Palmer and Preston Ltd., and the Northern Territory Land Company, Bean Brothers Limited and a founding member of the board of the Castle Salt Company.

He was a member of the Adelaide Theosophical Society, the major beneficiary of his will.

He was also a Vice President of the South Park Football Club an inaugural team in the SAFA from 1877 to 1884.

He was a keen horseman with stables at Lockleys and horses he raced in conjunction with William Reid, William Pile and William Gerrard, as well as many he owned on his own account. He was one of Adelaide's first greyhound breeders and racers, having extensive kennels at Corryton Park, where the South Australian Coursing Club held its bi-annual race meetings. He was in 1875 one of the founding members of the modern incarnation of South Australian Jockey Club, and was for many years a committee member. He seldom travelled by automobile, much preferring to ride in his victoria. He was an enthusiastic gardener and invariably wore in his buttonhole one of his own carnations.

In 1875 he took over "Tremere" (now demolished), the residence his father had owned at Glenelg, and was involved in local affairs, serving as mayor from 1880 to 1882 and 1912 to 1913.

He married Louisa Ann Carvosso (c. 1826 – c. 21 August 1912) on 14 March 1864. They had no children. Louisa Ann Carvosso's sister Jane Anna Earle was the mother of feminist Bessie Rischbieth OBE.

Rounsevell died after a long illness in Glenelg, South Australia. "Big breezy Ben" as he was known, was a very large man with a commanding presence. When in Parliament he spoke seldom and when he did it was short, to the point and factual.

Political offices
Preceded by Thomas Burgoyne	Commissioner of Public Works; 1890–1892	Succeeded by John Jenkins

== Bibliography ==
Rounsevell, James Corryton (1992), The Rounsevell family in early South Australia (2nd ed.), J.C. Rounsevell
