= James Rigby Beevor =

Australian colonist (1811–1849)

James Rigby Beevor (1811–1849) was a pioneer colonist and pastoralist of South Australia and a murder victim of the Australian frontier wars. Mount Beevor in South Australia is named after him.

== Origins ==
Beevor was born 1811 at Norwich, Norfolk, England, into the family of James Beevor, a brewery proprietor at Norwich, and Mary Beevor (née Rigby). He was descended from a prominent and titled Norfolk family, having a common ancestor with the Beevor baronets. His older brother, Rev. Edward Rigby Beevor (1798–1878), graduated B.A. at Cambridge.

== Military service ==
His father having sold the brewery, 20-year-old Beevor enlisted in the British Army on 3 October 1831 as an ensign in the East Suffolk Regiment of Foot. On 31 August 1832 he was promoted to lieutenant rank in that same regiment. In 1835 he eschewed the regular army to join the British Auxiliary Legion in the First Carlist War in Spain, serving as a cavalry captain in the 2nd Regiment Queen's Own Irish Lancers. His comrades there included Lieutenant Inman and Colonel Wakefield. Through them and others he was attracted to plans to establish a free colony in South Australia and, his father having died in 1836, decided to migrate there.

== South Australian colonist ==
Beevor departed London in January 1839 aboard the barque City of Adelaide, along with 75 immigrants. The barque suffered many storms. Having been dismasted in the English Channel it returned to port for repairs, and then needed further repairs at Rio de Janeiro, not arriving at Port Adelaide until July 1839.

Beevor promptly pioneered a sheep station northeast of Mount Barker, near Dawesley, on the eastern flanks of the Mount Lofty Ranges. His sheep run and homestead, then at the frontier of European settlement, was at the base of a prominent peak first discovered in January 1838 by European explorers Dr George Imlay and John Hill. That peak was consequently named Mount Beevor (498m). He there became firm friends with neighbouring pioneering pastoralists, the brothers Edward and Alexander Blucher Lodwick, who had arrived from London as cabin passengers aboard the ship Ganges in June 1839, about the same time that Beevor had landed.

Known generally as Captain Beevor he took a prominent role in civic affairs, attending Government House levees and serving on grand juries, though not holding any official office. In June 1841 he was appointed by Governor Grey to command the party of some thirty fellow pastoralists who had volunteered to accompany a police party led by Commissioner O'Halloran on an expedition to the Rufus River. This had followed an Aboriginal attack on the overlanders Henry Inman and Henry Field and it culminated three months later in the events known as the Rufus River massacre.

In that regard he had problems at his Mount Beevor home station, complaining of being constantly troubled by Aboriginal thefts, especially livestock. After Beevor (or one of his hired men) accidentally shot and killed an Aboriginal near his sheep yards (a ricochet from a warning shot) he lived in fear of retaliation from the man's relatives.

== Eyre Peninsula pioneer ==
He therefore quit his Mount Beevor Station in 1844 with the intention of forming another at distant Eyre Peninsula in partnership with John Charles Darke. He did not realise he was leaving a bad situation for a worse one. In the end Beevor did not join up with the ill-fated Darke. He instead went into partnership with his former neighbour Alex Lodwick, the pair transferring their pastoralist operations to pioneer a remote sheep station about 80 kilometres (50 mi) northwest of Port Lincoln at Mount Drummond. Having been granted a government occupation licence, they named it Taunto Station, building huts and yards while tending their expanding flocks.

== Death ==
=== Events concerning death ===
On 3 May 1849 Lodwick spent the day out with sheep while Beevor attended to chores at their Taunto hut, including making a rough bush chair. The previous night four transitory Aboriginal people, three men and one woman, spent the night hospitably at the homestead, but more were allegedly secreted nearby. When Lodwick returned at 5pm he found Beevor lying dead in front of the hut with two spears in him – one from the front and one from the back. The hut had been ransacked of flour and clothing and all of the Aboriginal people were gone.

There being no sign of struggle, Coroner W.S. Peter, a close friend of Beevor whose neighbouring Warrow Station was 16 kilometres (9.9 mi) away, concluded that the Aboriginal people had ambushed Beevor without warning, aided by his own formerly faithful Aboriginal servant. Colonists were shocked at this treachery because Beevor had a reputation for being a quiet, unassuming and kindly fellow who had extended great generosity toward Aboriginal people.

=== Trial and execution of murderers ===
Six Aboriginal men were arrested and charged with Beevor's murder or with being accessories. Tried at Adelaide, four were found not guilty, while two were convicted and sentenced to death. At the express wish of the three local J's. P., Henry Strong Price, W.S. Peter, and Charles J. Driver, the two condemned men, Needgalta and Kulgulta, were returned to the murder scene at Taunto station.

On 9 November 1849 they were there hanged from a gum tree using a spring cart scaffold in front of assembled Aboriginal witnesses, for whom this was intended to serve as a salutary warning. Their bodies were buried at Port Lincoln Gaol. Eight weeks later, in January 1850, Beevor's disheartened partner Alexander Lodwick left South Australia forever, sailing to the California Gold Rush.

Beevor's gravesite is unknown. Aged about 38, he had never married. Having died intestate, his appointed administrator was a creditor, G.S. Kingston.

In the hands of subsequent owners, particularly the Murray family, his Mount Beevor estate became a celebrated merino stud.
