= Richard Holland (horse breeder) =

South Australian horse breeder

Richard Holland (c. 1805 or 11 August 1815 – 25 November 1881) of "Turretfield", Rosenthal (now Rosedale), near Gawler, was an early settler of South Australia, noted for breeding racehorses. He imported many horses and some cattle into South Australia for the purpose of improving the local livestock. He was step-father to the Robertson brothers, pastoralists of the Upper Murray.

== History ==
Holland was born in the Hawkesbury district of New South Wales, near Windsor, (Note: Windsor was home to several people named Holland, including Richard Holland (1842 – 27 April 1926), of "The Cedars", Windsor, married Elizabeth Hall Fleming, (26 September 1840 – 6 or 7 December 1899) at Windsor on 15 September 1871. Another was Richard Holland (born 4 April 1884 – 25 June 1972) son of William Henry Holland and Eliza Ann Holland, née Wall, all of Windsor. Neither couple had children.) the son of Richard Holland (c. 1783 – 10 May 1867) a transported convict. who may have gained his freedom in 1828 or 1834, and Mary Holland, née Roberts (1793–1863). He lived for several years in the Windsor district.

Around 1840 Holland was involved with South Australians John McKinlay and James Pile in the purchase from a deceased estate of a boxed mob of cattle which, after sorting them out and droving them to Adelaide, proved profitable.

He moved to South Australia in 1848 and in 1849 acquired from John Chanter the licence for the "Black Bull" inn, Hindley Street, but relinquished it after three months.

In 1852 he married Margaret Robertson, widow of Robert Robertson, and adopted her three sons: John, William and Robert Robertson, aged around nine, seven and five years respectively. They purchased Turretfield around 1856 and were living there from that time.

The boys were prize-winning students at Adelaide Educational Institution in the years 1859–1864. Holland was living in the vicinity of Gawler much of this time, so it is likely Mrs Holland rented a house in the city to support her sons. All three retained the surname Robertson but John adopted "Holland" as a middle name in 1872 or earlier. Encouraged by Holland, they proved adept pastoralists and property managers.

=== Turretfield ===
34.550376°S 138.834209°E

On 31 January 1839 a consortium of Stephen King, John Reid, H. Dundas Murray, Thomas Stubbs and others was granted a special survey of 4,000 acres (1,600 ha) to be called the "Gawler Special Survey". The survey was carried out that year by William Jacob for the firm of Light, Finniss, & Co. Murray laid out the town of Gawler in its centre and a section on the North Para River was named by him "Turretfield". Surveyor George Warren named all members of the cartel in 1891.

In 1853 Holland purchased sections 838 and 839 in the Hundred of Nuriootpa, a total of 936 acres (379 ha) in the vicinity of Gawler, at the Government Land Sale. He ringed his properties with a sheep-proof wire fence, and a year later sought to block a road from being run between the two sections. This may be the land later referred to as 3079, jointly owned by Holland and James Martin. He is likely to have been the purchaser, in late 1854, of the 10 acres (4.0 ha) property "Turretfield", previously H. D. Murray's boiling-down works on the North Para River. In 1860 additional purchases brought his landholding to 1,800 acres (730 ha). One of these purchases had an established homestead, built in 1846, still standing in 1950, which would have served as their residence.

In 1860 he acquired more land, bringing his Turretfield holding to 1,800 acres (730 ha), using it for stock breeding and mixed farming, with pigs, horses and sheep. He established Turretfield as a stud farm by the addition of brood mares from Sydney, a Shorthorn bull, Berkshire pigs and creeping Malay fowls, a breed equally esteemed for eggs and the table. He established an orchard on the river flat, where all kinds of fruit were grown. Maize, sorghum, sugar cane and oats were planted, and wheat was grown on the southern end of the big block, and the younger Robertsons harvested the grain with two Mellor Brothers strippers. The stable had a granary loft.

==== "Holland House" ====
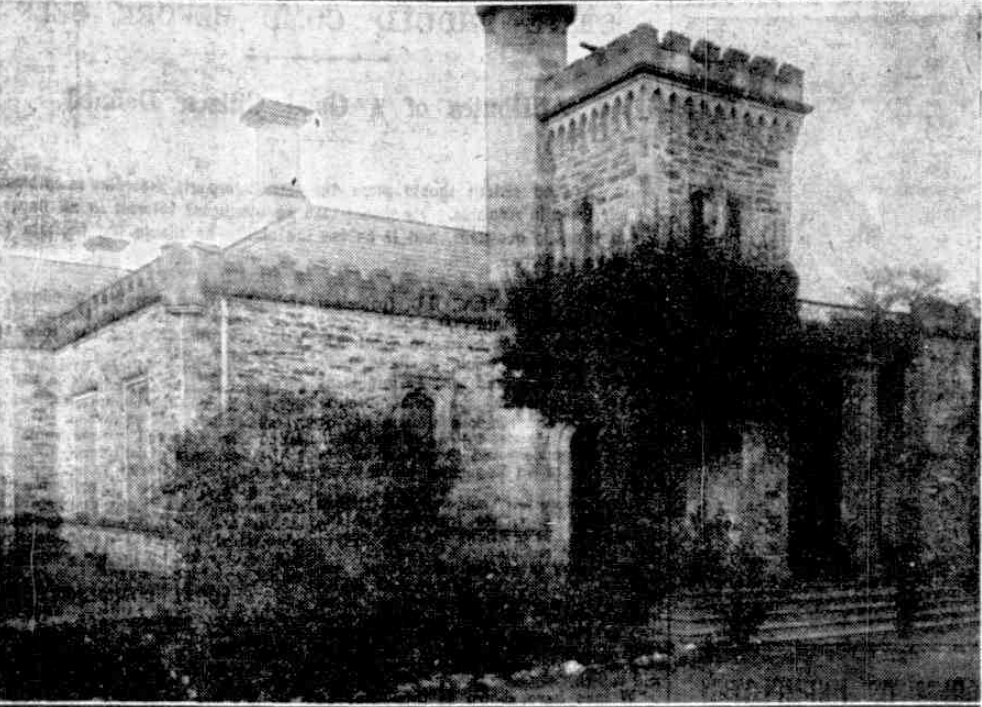
Holland House, Turretfield

Sometime around 1854 he engaged architect James Macgeorge to build him a two-storey residence of twelve rooms, then changed his mind and opted for a single-storey design of 14 main rooms that Macgeorge had previously drawn up, which would cost more. Macgeorge accepted the builder's revised quote. By 1860 only the stables had been completed so Holland sacked Macgeorge and appointed G. S. Kingston in his place. From reports of the Supreme Court hearing it appears that the builder, James Tyrie, had finished the contract by the end of 1861, but the new architect refused to pay for "extras" that had been approved by Macgeorge. Sandstone used for the decorative crenellations came from England as ships' ballast but the remainder was Barossa Valley sandstone. One major expense was a large in-ground tank to collect all the rain that fell on the main buildings. An extensive cellar was cut into the hillside. A less practical innovation was a vault or crypt built under the stairs of the conservatory at the front of the building. It was Holland's wish for his body to be entombed there when the time came.

Later dubbed "Holland House", the building was completed in 1862. It has been suggested that its design and scale were an attempt by Holland to outdo King's "Kingsford House", further along the North Para River.

=== Piapco and Bookpurnong ===
In 1863 Holland purchased the contiguous Piapco and Bookpurnong pastoral leases of 489 square miles (1,270 km^{2}) from (William) Chambers & (Frederick) Blades. James Trussel was manager of Piapco (Note: It is likely that Piapco, elsewhere mentioned as being near Moorunde, is the same area as that later known as Pyap. There is no evidence that the "co" in the River Murray leases Kardrapco, Murbko, Piapco, Qualco, Ramco, and Tepko is an abbreviation of "Company".) in 1864. William Robertson acted as manager for a few years before taking on Chowilla and Bookmark.

In 1873 or 1874 Holland sold the lease, with its 22,000 sheep, to A. B. Murray for £25,000 and William Robertson left for Queensland.

Archibald Henderson was manager of Bookpurnong from 1873 to around 1885. (Note: Elsewhere James Mclnnes Mackay is credited as Bookpurnong manager 1874–1875.) Murray was forced to relinquish the lease due to the rabbit pest.

=== Chowilla and Bookmark ===
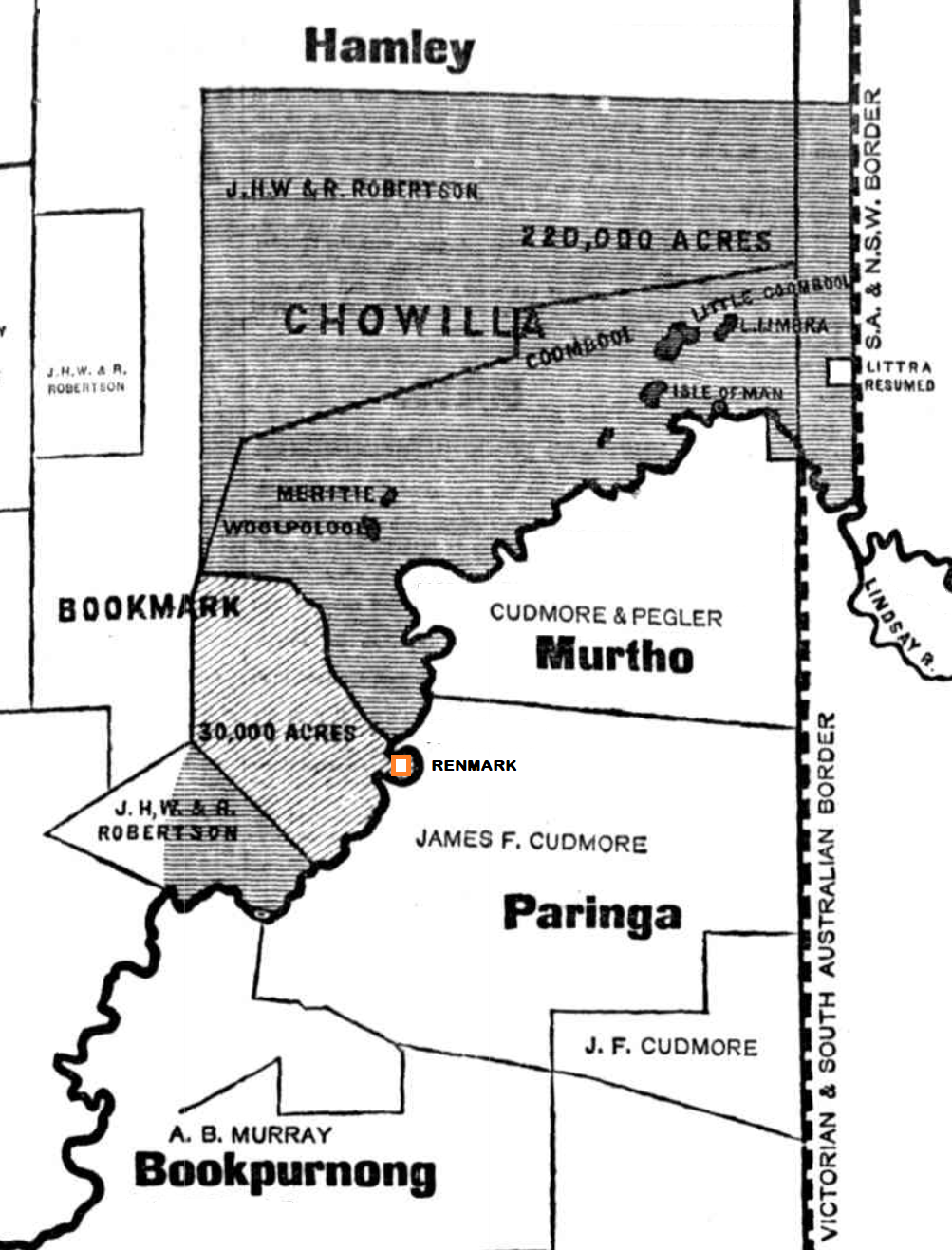
Upper Murray in 1887. The approximate location of Renmark has been added.

By 1866 Holland was the acknowledged owner of the Chowilla and Bookmark leases,

According to one account, in the early 1860s, Holland and a few of his men rode from Turretfield through the dense bush to Morgan with a view to acquiring leases as cattle grazing property for his stepsons. Exploring the thousands of square miles of country east of Overland Corner he observed the numbers and condition of stray cattle and horses in the area; clearly dropped by overlanders who had followed the River Murray from New South Wales. He thereupon decided to register a claim on the area and, according to one report, while camped on the banks of Chowilla Creek discussed his plans with his companions, one of whom he had designated overseer for his skills as a bushman. The following morning Holland discovered the overseer was missing, as was his horse, and concluded that the man intended to preempt his claim. It was a long and hard ride for Holland back to Morgan for a change of horses, and thence to Adelaide, but he was on the doorstep of the Lands Office before the overseer, and registered his claim to what became Chowilla and Bookmark stations. (Note: A similar tale is told of William Horn, who rode 164 miles in 12 hours (others say 22), to lodge claims for a lease of the Moonta copperfield. Another has Archibald Johnson racing a steamer to lodge his claim for land at Millicent.)

A less romantic account has Albemarle Bertie Cator taking the lease in July 1851, then five or six years later dividing it and selling one part to William Finke and the other to John and James Chambers, and it was Finke who, in 1859, named his sections "Bookmark" and "Chowilla". In 1867 John Chambers took over Bookmark and Chowilla from Finke, which he sold to Holland sometime around 1870. Holland also took up lease 1657c, adjacent the river and extending north-east [sic] from Springcart Gully.

By 1871 William Robertson was Holland's overseer. He left for Queensland sometime around 1873 or 1874 and Holland passed Bookmark and Chowilla stations to John and Robert Robertson as joint managers. By 1875 Bookmark was recognised as the Robertson brothers' property. and in 1876 they sold their cattle holdings, having determined to concentrate on sheep.

In 1887 agreement was reached by the South Australian government and Chaffey Brothers to excise 30,000 acres (12,000 ha) of Bookmark station with 6 miles (9.7 km) of River Murray frontage for their irrigation settlement and creation of a new town: Renmark, the name by which the nearby river flats had been known since 1883 or earlier.

In 1896 the Robertson brothers ceased joint management of their two properties, Robert Robertson taking over Chowilla, and John H. Robertson taking over Bookmark, at the same time changing its name to Calperum.

=== Breeding at Turretfield ===
In 1859 he purchased the prize-winning black draught horse Humphrey Clinker and another draught horse, Young Briton. He imported the shorthorn bull Fandango, but his greatest contribution was to the thoroughbred racehorse industry:

In 1863 he imported the thoroughbred horse Transit from Sydney. He purchased Quicksilver in 1864.

In 1865 he imported Tarragon, son of New Warrior, specifically for the Adelaide Cup, but disappointed his backers.

He imported the dark bay Blue Gown, a Beadsman colt. Blue Gown died in 1880 or 1881 and was replaced by The Englishman, a son of Lecturer. His mares included Pawnbroker, Totalisator, The Israelite, Turretfield, and Crystal.

In 1882 the whole of his stud was put up for sale by auction at Barker & Chambers' Bazaar. The Englishman and the mares Deceptive, Catspaw, Tinfinder, and Ithaca, were purchased by the Robertson brothers for their stud at Chowilla. The Assyrian won the 1882 Melbourne Cup for her new owner, C. S. Agnew, and took the Hobart Cup the following year.

== Personal ==
It has been claimed by one Beatrice Dalton that her father Harry Holland was a brother of Richard Holland, and lived for a time at Turretfield. No evidence has been found to support any of these claims.

== Other interests ==
In 1859 Holland was chairman of the Gawler Show and Ploughing Match. In 1862 he was on the committee of the Agricultural and Horticultural Society. In 1868 he was chairman of the Nuriootpa town council, then retired by rotation. By the 1870s he was well-known on the Adelaide racetrack, a close rival of Gabriel Bennett, with an entry in most races conducted by the Hunt Club. He was the owner of Australian Buck, who won the 1872 Adelaide Cup. He died in 1878, aged 11 years, and a post mortem examination found his heart weighed 10 lb 2 oz. (4.6 kg). In 1873 Holland had an argument with one of the stewards, William Knox Simms, calling him a "wretch, a bookmaker and a blackleg" and threatened to punch his face, resulting in Holland being disqualified for 12 months. When the South Australian Jockey Club was re-formed in 1875 Holland was a regular entrant.

== Last days ==
Holland died on 25 November 1881. It had been his wish for a Church of England funeral and for his remains to be interred under the stone stairs of the conservatory at the front of the house, an arrangement which could only be temporary, as the house was to be sold. Frederick Fowler the undertaker, following his directions, made three caskets: two of cedar and one of lead, but Rev. Alfred Sells, the rector from Lyndoch, balked at reading the service over a coffin in unconsecrated ground. The trustees organised for the coffin to be discreetly removed from the vault by Fowler, and on 7 December 1881 was interred at St George's Church Cemetery, Gawler. 17 years later, on 22 December 1898, the remains of Margaret Holland were interred alongside, attended by a "large concourse of relatives and friends". No mention was made of Holland's stepsons' presence or absence in these proceedings.

In accordance with Holland's wishes, the whole of his stud was liquidated in May 1882. The mares Deceptive, Ithaca, Catspaw, and Tinfinder, and the stallion The Englishman were purchased by the Robertson brothers, who continued their breeding program at Turretfield, managed by William Robertson, who also had interests in Nickavilla Station, in Queensland.

The Robertson brothers inherited "Holland House" and the Turretfield property. They sold them to Henry Angas Evans, brother-in-law of John Howard Angas, in 1889. Evans died on 4 September 1901.

In November 1900 the South Australian Government purchased the whole of Turretfield, comprising sections 571, 674, 675 and 676, Hundred of Nurioopta, and sections 1709 and 1712, Hundred of Barossa, a total of 1,604 acres (649 ha) for 10 gns. per acre, and in the interest of furthering agricultural and pastoral science, developed it as the Turretfield Research Centre.

== 21st-century ==
Chowilla Station, of 94,000 hectares, is a regional reserve Crown Lease administered by the Department for Environment, Heritage and Aboriginal Affairs and continued to be associated with the Robertson family into the 21st-century, owned by Robertson-Chowilla Pty Ltd and operated by Jock and Lis Robertson, major shareholders in the company.

== Family ==
In 1852 Holland married Mrs Margaret Robertson, née Harper (c. 1816 – 21 December 1898), who had three sons from her marriage to Robert Robertson (died 9 February 1847), retired sea captain. (Note: Robert and Margaret Robertson arrived in South Australia by the Buckinghamshire in 1839, settling near modern Salisbury, followed by the areas later known as Pewsey Vale and Gawler, where he built and ran the Bushman Inn 1840–1842, and was also postmaster, then Angas Park, finally Lyndoch Valley, where they purchased land from the South Australian Company, and remained her property to 1898, and Robert junior was born. One source asserts that Mrs Robertson was Holland's housekeeper, possibly meaning she ran a boarding house.) Their children were:

- John Holland Robertson (15 January 1843 – 20 January 1909), of Bookmark/Calperum station, was born at Gawler, married Ellen "Nellie" Rees George (c. 1853 – 3 June 1948) on 22 January 1878. They had three daughters: Madeline, Marion and Juliet.
- William Robertson (5 December 1844 – 24 September 1914) was born at Angas Park, married Blanche Scott (died 14 March 1934) of Wilmington on 23 April 1886. He was owner of Nickavilla and Turretfield stations
- Robert Robertson (5 November 1846 – 16 December 1928) later of Chowilla station; he was born at Lyndoch valley and married Adelaide Mary Harvey on 14 November 1878.

- William Arthur Robertson (1879–1954) married Marjory Daw on 18 April 1914
- Robert Robertson of Condobolin (1881–1944? )
- John Harper Robertson (1883–1968) married lived Glenloth, O'Halloran Hill

- (Colin) Scott Robertson (1912– )

- (Adelaide) Mary Robertson (1884–1857) married Lang of Wiela, Murthoo
- Douglas Robertson (1887–1953? 1966?) of "Ockley", Nuriootpa
- Kathleen Robertson (1891–1983) married DuRieu, of "Lagonda", Renmark

Henry Edward Holland (1830–1906) was a younger brother. He married Sarah Neal or Neale (1842–1892). His Terrangan (or Tarrangan, other spellings) station on the Bogan River was sold to James Lee in 1875. later lived at "Rampsbeck", Aberfoyle in the New England region.

- His eldest son was another Richard Holland (c. 1868? 1870? – 24 June 1904), horse and cattle breeder, born on the Bogan River, not far from William Holland's Nickavilla station. He married Elizabeth Childs (died 18 September 1902). They had a son born c. 1890 and daughters born c. 1894 and c. 1896. One J. Robertson (John?) was related by marriage.

George Harper (c. 1814 – 10 February 1901) was an older brother of Margaret Holland. He arrived in South Australia in May 1848 aboard the Orbona, and purchased Chester Hall farm of 630 acres (250 ha) 9 miles (14 km) west of Gawler, which in 1886 he endowed on the Robertson brothers in exchange for an annuity of £200 per annum for life. This was taken over by William Robertson in 1890, but became an embarrassment financially when Harper persisted far beyond the Biblical "three score years and ten". He lived with his sister from the death of her first husband, and at Turretfield, then with her death moved to Unley, where he died. Frank Harper (died 1888) of Torgorm, Inverness, Scotland, was another brother.
