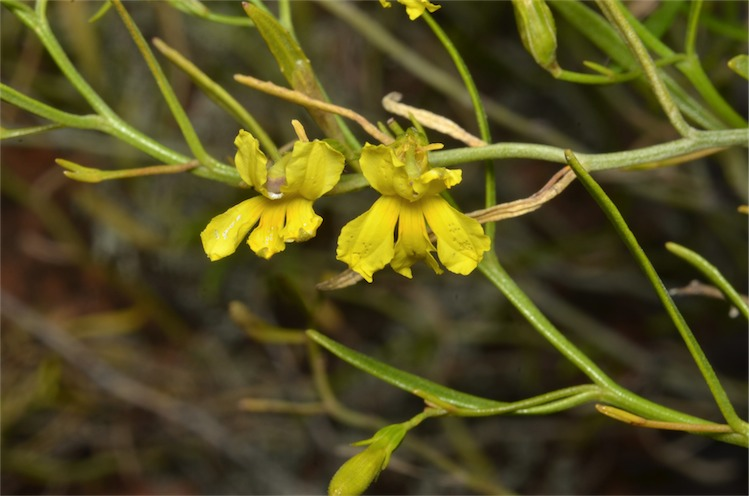

Conservation status
- Priority Three — Poorly Known Taxa (DEC)

Scientific classification
- Kingdom: Plantae
- Clade: Tracheophytes
- Clade: Angiosperms
- Clade: Eudicots
- Clade: Asterids
- Order: Asterales
- Family: Goodeniaceae
- Genus: Goodenia
- Species: G. vernicosa

Binomial name
- Goodenia vernicosa J.M.Black

= Goodenia vernicosa =

Wavy goodenia

Species of plant

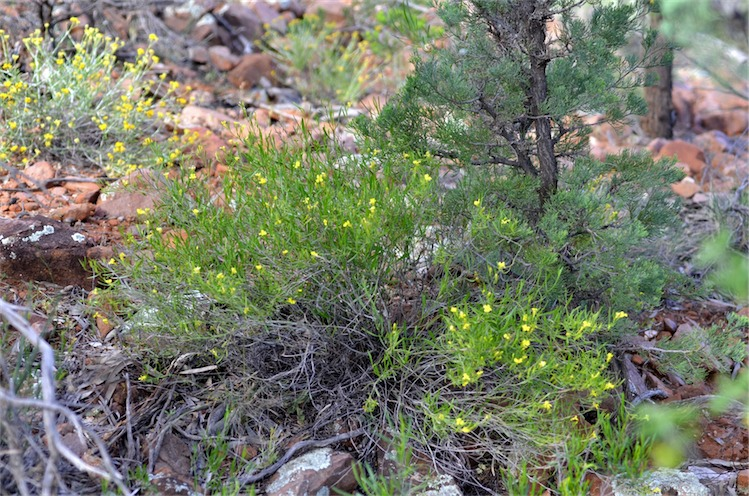
Habit near Hawker

Goodenia vernicosa, commonly known as wavy goodenia, is a species of flowering plant in the family Goodeniaceae and is endemic to South Australia. It is an erect shrub with sticky, later varnished foliage, elliptic to lance-shaped, sometimes toothed leaves and racemes or thyrses of yellow flowers.

== Description ==
Goodenia vernicosa is an erect shrub that typically grows to a height of up to 1 m (3 ft 3 in) with foliage that is sticky at first, later varnished. The leaves are narrow elliptic to lance-shaped with the narrower end towards the base, 15–40 mm (0.59–1.57 in) long and 5–20 mm (0.20–0.79 in) wide, the edges sometimes toothed. The flowers are arranged in racemes or thyrses up to 200 mm (7.9 in) long on a peduncle 3–7 mm (0.12–0.28 in) long, with leaf-like bracts and linear bracteoles 2–5 mm (0.079–0.197 in) long, each flower on a pedicel 3–8 mm (0.12–0.31 in) long. The sepals are linear, 6–10 mm (0.24–0.39 in) long, the petals yellow and 12–15 mm (0.47–0.59 in) long. The lower lobes of the corolla are 6–7 mm (0.24–0.28 in) long with wings up to 3 mm (0.12 in) wide. Flowering mainly occurs from September to January and the fruit is an oval or cylindrical capsule 7–9 mm (0.28–0.35 in) long.

== Taxonomy and naming ==
Goodenia vernicosa was first formally described in 1919 by John McConnell Black in Transactions and Proceedings of the Royal Society of South Australia from specimens collected by Ernest Ising on Mount Patawarta near Moolooloo. The specific epithet (vernicosa) means "varnished".

== Distribution ==
This goodenia occurs in the Flinders Ranges of South Australia.
