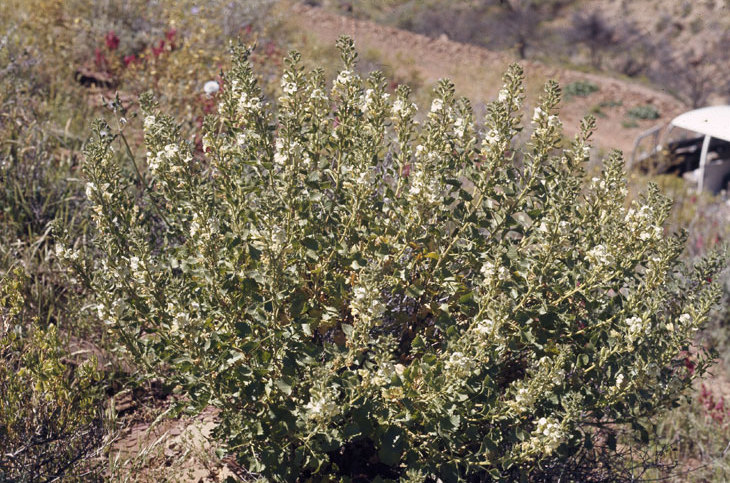

Scientific classification
- Kingdom: Plantae
- Clade: Tracheophytes
- Clade: Angiosperms
- Clade: Eudicots
- Clade: Asterids
- Order: Asterales
- Family: Goodeniaceae
- Genus: Goodenia
- Species: G. chambersii

Binomial name
- Goodenia chambersii F.Muell.

Synonyms
- Goodenia grandiflora var. chambersii (F.Muell.) K.Krause; Goodenia helenae Ising

= Goodenia chambersii =

Species of plant

Goodenia chambersii is a species of flowering plant in the family Goodeniaceae and is endemic to South Australia. It is an ascending shrub with toothed, broadly egg-shaped to round leaves, racemes or thyrses of yellow flowers and oval fruit.

== Description ==
Goodenia chambersii is an ascending shrub that typically grows to a height of 50 cm (20 in) and has somewhat sticky foliage. The leaves are broadly egg-shaped to round, toothed, 15–30 mm (0.59–1.18 in) long and 10–30 mm (0.39–1.18 in) wide on a petiole up to 15 mm (0.59 in) long. The flowers are arranged in racemes or thyrses up to 200 mm (7.9 in) long on a peduncle 2–5 mm (0.079–0.197 in) long with linear bracteoles 5–7 mm (0.20–0.28 in) long at the base, each flower on a pedicel 5–10 mm (0.20–0.39 in) long. The sepals are lance-shaped, 5–6 mm (0.20–0.24 in) long and the petals are yellow and 18–25 mm (0.71–0.98 in) long. The lower lobes of the corolla are about 10 mm (0.39 in) long with wings about 1.5 mm (0.059 in) wide. Flowering occurs from September to October and the fruit is an oval capsule about 12 mm (0.47 in) long.

== Taxonomy and naming ==
Goodenia chambersii was first formally described in 1859 by Ferdinand von Mueller in Fragmenta Phytographiae Australiae from material collected by John McDouall Stuart, possibly in 1858, in the ranges to the west of the Lake Eyre basin. The specific epithet (chambersii) honour James and John Chambers who sponsored McDouall Stuart's expeditions.

== Distribution and habitat ==
Goodenia chambersii grows on stony slopes and near watercourse in central South Australia, near the Lake Eyre basin.
