= Alexander Killen Macbeth =

Alexander Killen Macbeth CMG DSc FAA
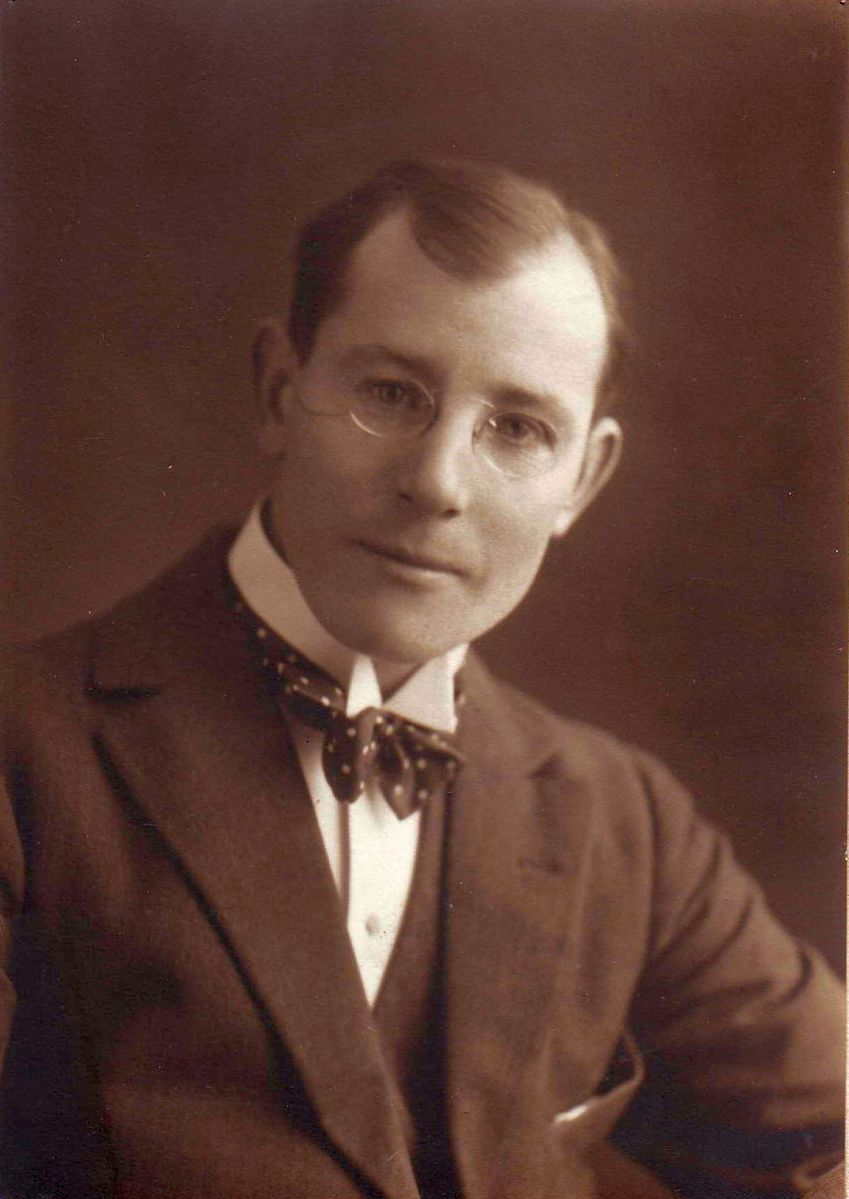
- Born: 11 August 1889; Drumbuoy, Strabane
- Died: 29 May 1957 (aged 67); Adelaide
- Resting place: Centennial Park Cemetery, Pasadena, South Australia
- Education: Queen’s University Belfast; University College London,
- Alma mater: University College London
- Spouse: Edyth Helenea Patricia Macafee
- Children: Patricia Maeve; Anna Maureen; Moya H.M. William A.G.
- Scientific career
- Institutions: University of St Andrews; Durham University
- Notable students: James Robert Price

Alexander Killen Macbeth CMG, DSc, FAA was born in Ireland on 11 August 1889 at Drumbuoy, Strabane, second son of William, a butcher, and Sarah Anna.

He was educated at Queen’s University Belfast, and at University College London, where he was an 1851 Exhibition Scholar. He returned to Belfast and then, in 1919, to the University of St Andrews as a Senior Lecturer in Chemistry. From 1924 to 1928 he held the position of Reader in Chemistry at Durham University.

On 13 January 1928, Macbeth with his wife and two daughters sailed on the RMS Mooltan from London to Adelaide. There he took up his appointment as the Angas Chair of Chemistry in the University of Adelaide, which he held until his retirement in 1954, when he was created Professor Emeritus. He held the degrees of M.A. and D.Sc. of the Queen’s University Belfast, and was elected to the Fellowship of the Australian Academy of Science in 1955. In 1946 he was awarded the CMG for his services to the University of Adelaide and to industry during the war.

Macbeth’s tenure of the Adelaide Chair coincided with the depression and then with the Second World War. Nevertheless, he developed a thriving department, “starting initially with one Liebig condenser and a few flasks”. This perseverance finally resulted in a new chemistry school, which opened in 1933.

== Family ==
Alexander Killen Macbeth married Edyth Helenea Patricia Macafee in Ireland in 1921. They had four children: Patricia Maeve, Anna Maureen, Moya H.M. and William A.G. Moya and William were born in Australia.

Killen Macbeth, as he was usually known, died on 29 May 1957 in Adelaide. He is buried at Centennial Park Cemetery, Pasadena, South Australia. His wife Edyth died on 27 August 1986 and is buried with him.
