= Charles Howard Angas =

Charles Howard Angas (21 April 1861 – 11 December 1928) was a pastoralist in South Australia.

== History ==
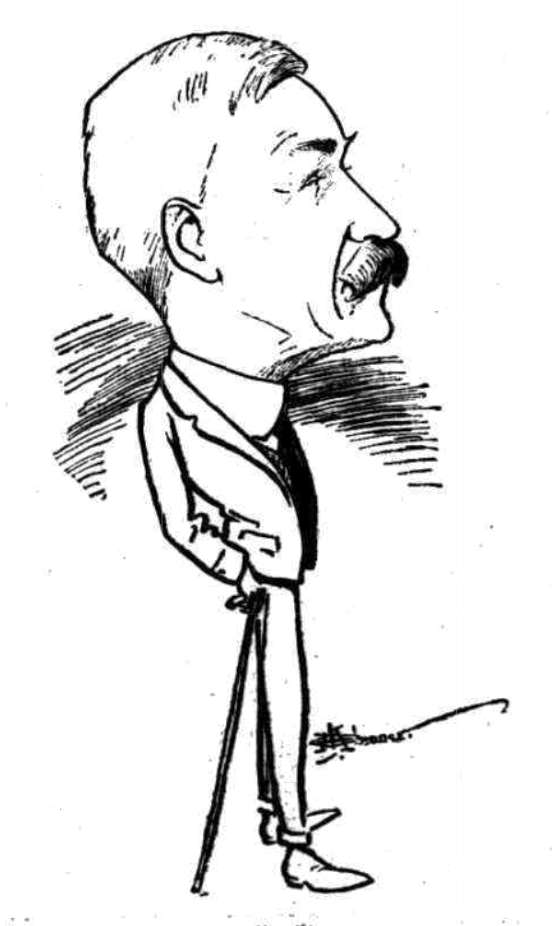
Caricature by J. H. Chinner

John Howard Angas (5 October 1823 – 17 May 1904) and Susanne Angas née Collins (c. 1834 – 14 April 1910) met and were married in England in 1854 and returned to the family property "Collingrove" near Angaston in 1855. Country life did not agree with Mrs. Angas however, and on their next visit to the "Old Country", she remained there, and for the next six years, her husband lived alternately with her and in South Australia, supervising his pastoral interests.

Charles Howard Angas was born at Upper Clapton, England, on 21 April 1861, and his sister Lilian Gertrude Angas on 13 December 1862. In May 1863 Mr. and Mrs. J. H. Angas returned to South Australia on the steamer Pera, with their two infant children, and settled at the family estate "Collingrove", where Charles lived until 1870, when he was sent to England for schooling.

The family was together in England when news of the death of Charles's grandfather George Fife Angas (1 May 1789 – 15 May 1879) was received, and they immediately returned to South Australia. From this time progressively more of the responsibility for managing the family's properties fell to Charles. His father was a successful breeder of Merino and Lincoln sheep, Hackney ponies, and Shorthorn cattle, and Charles continued the tradition.

Angas died at his residence "Lindsay Park", Angaston.

== Other interests ==
Angas was known as both patron of art and a practitioner. He was a prominent member of the Royal Agricultural Society. He was a member of the Children's Hospital board, and followed his father and grandfather as a generous financial supporter. After the death of its president Sir Samuel Way, he held the position for ten years. He held various offices with the Y.M.C.A, and a generous supporter.

He was well known as a breeder of polo ponies and was a regular exhibitor of horses at the Adelaide Show. He was frequently called on to act as a judge of horses and other stock in the eastern States.

He was also a follower of cricket, and donated the clock above the scoreboard at the Adelaide Oval.

He was a lover of coursing, and was a noted judge and breeder of greyhounds. His attended most Waterloo Cup meetings and was a vice-patron of the South Australian Coursing Club, which organised the Waterloo Cup. He coursed many greyhounds during his long association with the sport, and although his dogs never won the Waterloo Cup, they came second place on three occasions. He was also patron of the Adelaide Plumpton Coursing Club. Among his dogs were Curio, and Wharminda, for which he paid 75 guineas, and was one of the fastest in Australia.

== Family ==
In 1887 he married Eliza Etty Dean (1861–1926), a daughter of William (c. 1830–1896) and Esther Theyer Dean née Gardner (c. 1837–1922). They had three sons and one daughter:

- Ronald Fife Angas (1889–1978) married Monica Alice Murray (1896–1973), daughter of Alick J. Murray, on 8 June 1915. He served in the R.A.F. during WWI
- Dudley Theyer Angas (1892–1942) married Canadian Mary Abbott on 18 April 1925. He was a member of the British Flying Corps in France and Flanders, and later in South-West Africa
- John Keith Angas (1900–1977) married Gwynneth Fay Good (1899–1991) in 1924
- Beryl Collins Angas (1887–) married Robert (Nathaniel) Dudley Ryder (1882– ) of the 8th Hussars on 16 September 1908. He was aide-de-camp to Sir G. R. Le Hunte, Governor of South Australia, and a brother of the Earl of Harrowby.
