= Moolooloo =

Pastoral lease in South Australia

Coordinates: 30.9901°S 138.5784°E

Location in South Australia

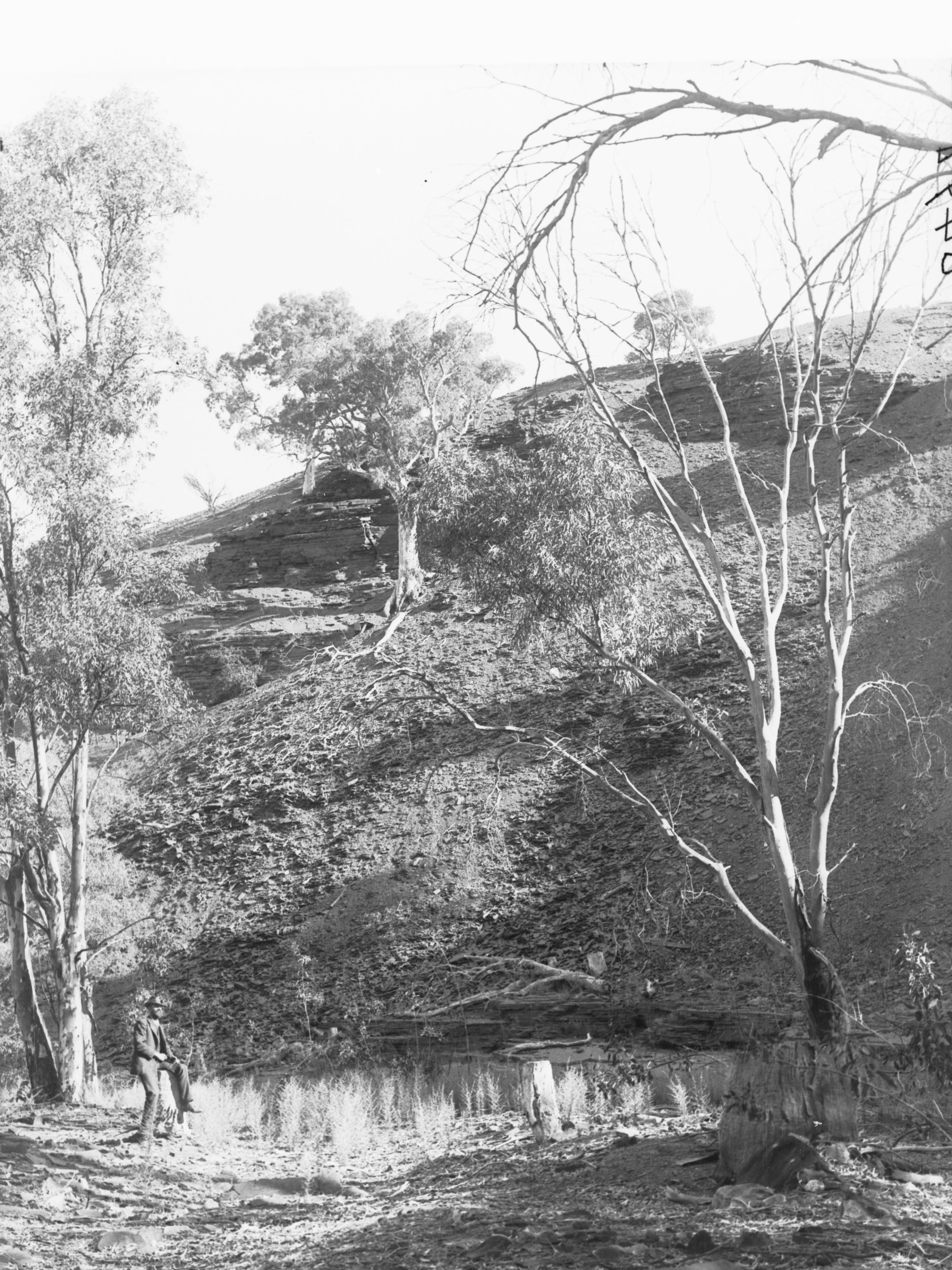
Mountain at Moolooloo, ca. 1925

Moolooloo Station (also known as Moolooloo and Moorillah Stations) is a pastoral lease that operates as a sheep station in South Australia.

It is situated approximately 15 kilometres (9 mi) north west of Blinman and 47 kilometres (29 mi) south of Leigh Creek.

The property was established in 1851 and originally known as Oratunga Station. John McKinley and his brother stocked the property with sheep and built a stone hut known as Howannigan, the ruins of which can still be seen today. John and James Chambers acquired the station in 1853. Five leases totalling 18 square miles (47 km^{2}) were taken up between 1853 and 1858. Copper was found by James Chambers and William Finke in 1857 along the southern boundary. The pair worked the deposit, establishing the Oratunga mine. The store at Moolooloo burnt down in 1861, with the Chambers losing a large supply in the resulting explosion. In 1863 the woolshed and adjoining sheep yards were destroyed by a fire that was started accidentally.

In 1870 Philip Levi's company disposed of many of its properties including Moolooloo and Wirrealpa, Oulnina and Wadnaminga, Mount Margaret and Booleroo Station. Together these properties were stocked with over 70,000 sheep and 3,000 cattle.

Moolooloo and Moorillah Stations are currently both run by the same family and together occupy an area of 609 square kilometres (235 sq mi). The shearers' quarters are used now for tourist accommodation.

The land occupying the extent of the Moolooloo pastoral lease was gazetted as two localities by the Government of South Australia on 26 April 2013 under the names Moolooloo and Moorillah.

== See also ==
- List of ranches and stations
