= William Finke =

William Finke (/ˈfinkə/ FINK-uh; German: [ˈfɪŋkə]; 1814 or 1815 – 17 January 1864) was chief clerk to the first treasurer of the province of South Australia who arrived in the first fleet carrying British settlers there. He became an explorer, prospector and pastoralist, and was a sponsor of John McDouall Stuart's explorations into the interior of the continent.

== History ==
Finke, who may have been born Johann Wilhelm Finke (German: [ˈjoːhan ˈvɪlhɛlm ˈfɪŋkə]) from Cuxhaven in Germany, arrived in South Australia in November 1836 aboard the Tam O'Shanter, a vessel of the First Fleet of South Australia.

He was a member of a syndicate with Osmond Gilles, the first treasurer of the province, his nephew John Jackson Oakden and three others, (Note: Other members were Gilles's ward, Emily Blunden (died 1875), who also emigrated aboard HMS Buffalo, H. R. Wigley (Resident Magistrate and father of W. R. Wigley), and solicitor Matthew Smith (c. 1794 – 18 November 1858).) who entered the ballot in February 1839 for the right to purchase land in Glenelg, in which they were successful. Finke is shown as "chief clerk of the Treasury" in the public notice of the ballot. Finke had been appointed chief clerk to Gilles, and in 1839 was put in charge of mining galena for Gilles's Glen Osmond Union Mining Company, the first mine for metal-bearing ores in South Australia and perhaps Australia. He was also appointed honorary secretary of the Glenelg Pier and Warehouse Company, which had offices in Gilles Arcade, Adelaide.

Finke was an energetic explorer and prospector throughout South Australia, particularly in the northern Flinders Ranges, where he established productive copper mines at Nuccaleena and Oratunga, but missed the huge deposits at Burra and Kapunda. He frequently employed Scottish explorer John McDouall Stuart as travelling companion on these trips.

Finke and James Chambers developed the Moolooloo station, from where Stuart's final and successful expedition departed. James died before the party's triumphant return and Finke not long after. John Chambers, as executor of his brother's will, sold the run to Philip Levi & Co., who sold it to John Rounsevell in 1871. Finke also had the lease on a property west and north of the River Murray, sections of which in 1859 he named "Bookmark" and "Chowilla", and in 1867 were taken over by John Chambers and sold to Richard Holland sometime around 1870.

Finke died at the John Bull Inn in Currie Street, Adelaide. His remains were buried at the North Road Cemetery, in the Adelaide suburb of Nailsworth.

Anna Timmermann, Andreas Finke and Wilhelmina Arndt of Germany were named as having an interest in two properties in Glenelg two years after Finke's death.

== Place names ==
The Finke River in central Australia and Mount Finke in South Australia were named after him by Stuart in 1858 and 1860 respectively. Finke Bay on the coast of the Van Diemen Gulf in the Northern Territory is considered to have been named after Finke by Stuart in 1862. The tiny settlement of Finke, which grew around a railway siding on the Central Australia Railway and is now also known by its traditional name Aputula, derived its name from the nearby Finke River.
