= Champion Brothers =

Francis Henry Champion (c. 1817 – 29 March 1902) and Richard Champion (c. 1802 – 17 January 1870) were soap makers in South Australia who in an important legal case were sued by a neighbouring property owner for odours produced in the practice of their trade.

== History ==
Francis Champion emigrated to South Australia in 1855; his elder brother Richard Champion emigrated with his family around the same time, possibly on the same ship. Francis Champion, and perhaps also his brother, worked for a time at the Sturt Street soap and candle factory of Moore & Tidmarsh (nominally 1849–1859, but in reality Tidmarsh's company from 1852), and left their employ to start his own factory.

They purchased Lot 1866, of Section 354 in the township of Bowden (Gibson Street?) from Edward Kelly in 1860 and immediately set about erecting buildings and installing the vats necessary for rendering fat and tallow from butchers' scraps.

A civil action was brought before the local court by one Dixon against the company for damages, claiming loss of enjoyment and loss of value of their residence occasioned by the smells emanating from the factory, situated some 200 or 300 yards (or metres) distant. The case was heard on 20 April 1864, and non-suited after a greater number of witnesses claimed not to have been inconvenienced, and to the fact that the smell was not injurious to health. The case was brought to the Supreme Court before Justice Boothby the following June, when Mr. Dixon revealed that he was being backed financially by John Howard Angas, and they intended using the courts to break the Champions financially if they could not force them to relocate. Dixon also objected to the sign on the Champions' building, which he found offensive. Angas had purchased from his father the fine residence "Prospect Hall" on nearby Torrens Road at the corner overlooking the Park Lands (not to be confused with J. B. Graham's "Prospect House", aka "Graham's Castle" on Prospect Road, Prospect). The court found for the plaintiff, but only awarded him damages of one shilling. The case aroused a great deal of public sympathy, and in response to an advertisement a well-attended public meeting was held at the Hotel Europe chaired by the Mayor Sam Goode. Speakers decried the ability of the well-heeled to control where and how tradesmen could pursue their trades, and considered this case the "thin end of the wedge". A collection was held to defray the Champions' court costs. The case gained some importance in the field of town planning.

The partnership was dissolved October 1864, and with the announcement the brothers thanked their supporters. By 1867 F. H. Champion had re-established the factory on River Street Hindmarsh, where other businesses of a similar nature, such as Peacock and Son, and Bean Brothers, were already established.

The business operated until 1882, when it closed, hastened perhaps by the appearance on nearby Adam Street of the Apollo Soap and Stearine Company, a large interstate competitor. George Wilcox (1838–1917) was managing director of Apollo's Adelaide factory, which was taken over by Burford's in 1887, with Thomas Mossop (c. 1818–1896) as manager, after an economic recession which closed many businesses.

== See also ==
Rendering (animal products)
History of candle making

== Family ==
Richard Champion (c. 1802 – 17 January 1870) married to Ann (c. 1800 – 12 January 1875)

- James Banfield Champion (c. 1828 – 21 November 1916) married Mary Cornish (c. 1829 – 22 February 1908) on 6 January 1853

- Fanny Champion (c. 1864 – 1934) married Rev. Charles Henry Nield (c. 1859 – 19 April 1939) on 8 February 1888. They had a large family.

- Mary Jane Champion (c. 1832 – 1 March 1910) married schoolteacher John Tregenza (c. 1831 – 4 August 1866)

- George Champion Tregenza (c. 1858 – 19 September 1938) married Kate Edith "Katie" Gray (c. 1861 – 26 February 1929) on 29 January 1885
- Edward James Tregenza (14 August 1860 – ) married Laura Mary Lloyd (c. 1866 – 5 April 1906) on 20 March 1890
- Lewis Gawler Tregenza (c. November 1862 – 6 March 1868)
- Percy John Tregenza (c. 1863 – 16 June 1938) married Sarah Jane Lloyd ( – 31 March 1929) on 20 March 1890

- Elizabeth Champion ( – 1886?) married Thomas Henry Willoughby (c. 1834 – 19 February 1868) of Port Adelaide on 13 July 1864

- Henry Champion Willoughby (1865–1867)

- Agnes Champion (c. 1845 – 20 December 1905) married John Hawke (c. 1845 – 28 August 1885) of Bowden on 16 February 1869

- Clara Grace Hawke (1 February 1870 – )
- Herbert Francis Hawke (1872–1874)
- Elsie Marion Hawke (19 August 1874 – )

Francis Henry Champion (c. 1817 – 29 March 1902) was married to Jane Champion née Cornish (c. 1822 – 13 May 1891); their children include:

- daughter, further details yet to find. ( ... he leaves two daughters by his first wife.)
- Emma Jane Champion (4 June 1862 – 14 October 1916) married Ernest Francis "Frank" Barton (c. 1859 – 29 June 1948) on 7 June 1883. Lived in Western Australia.

- Myra Barton ( – ) married David Thompson
- Harold Barton ( – ) married Linda

He married again, to Harriet Bennett ( – 4 February 1898) in 1893. They had no further children
