= Alick J. Murray =

Alexander James "Alick" Murray (ca.1850 – 18 April 1929) was a pastoralist and sheep breeder of South Australia.

== History ==
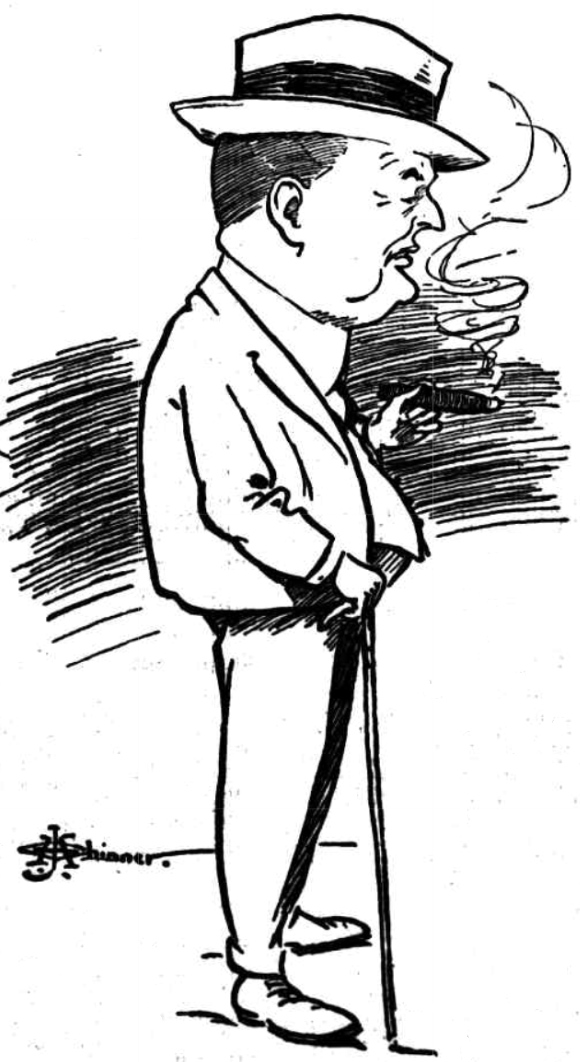
caricature by J. H. Chinner

Alick was the third son of John Murray of Murray Vale Estate, Mount Crawford and nephew of Alexander Borthwick Murray, both noted sheep breeders.

He was for many years a member of Roseworthy College council, and presented the college with a quantity of valuable livestock.

In January 1887, the four sons of John Murray: John Murray of Rhine Park, Eden Valley, T. Hope Murray, of Mount Beevor, Nairne, Alick J. Murray, of Mount Crawford and W. A. Murray, of Cappeedee, Hallett, purchased the whole flock from their father's executors, and divided it into equal parts, so that each should have one fourth of equal merit. Since then they were shown successfully. Alick continued his father's work at Mount Crawford Estate: his proudest distinction was the winning of the champion ribbon for merino ewe at the Adelaide Royal Show eight times and seven years in succession from 1897. He was also a notable Jersey cattle breeder.

Around 1919 Mount Crawford Estate was compulsorily acquired by the Government for the creation of the Warren Reservoir, and Murray retired from pastoral pursuits to his home "The Avenues" at Medindie. The livestock was transferred to his brothers' Catarpo and Petherton stations.

He was a member of the Royal Agricultural and Horticultural Society and its president from 1907 to 1908.

He was for many years chairman of the Mount Crawford district council.

He was a director of Elder Smith & Co Ltd from 1901 and a foundation director of Elders Trustee and Executor Co.

He was a director of the Yudnapinna Pastoral Company.

He was a noted breeder of polo ponies, and one of Australia's best polo players, and a life member of the Adelaide Polo Club. The Mount Crawford polo team, which consisted of Alick, his sons Cyril and Eric, nephew Elliott Murray, and son-in-law Ronald Angas was highly successful.

== Family ==
Alick was the third son of John Murray (c. 1812 – 13 September 1886) and Alison (c. 1820 – 9 June 1895) who arrived in South Australia from Scotland in 1853.

He married Alice Elizabeth Bowman (1862 – 22 April 1928) on 23 June 1891. She was a daughter of Edmund Bowman of "Barton Vale", Enfield and sister of Clarissa Eveline Jay. Their children were:

- J(ohn) Cyril Murray (1892–1947) of Caterpo station, Mount Bryan, South Australia married Cathleen Eliza Wilson in 1917
- Eric Moray Murray (1894–1953) of Petherton Station
- Monica Alice Murray (1896 –1973) married Ronald Fyfe Angas (1889–1978) of Collingrove, son of Charles Howard Angas.
