= Michael Ian Bruce =

Australian chemist

Michael Ian Bruce, DSc, FAA (born 17 November 1938), born and educated in England, became Professor of Physical and Inorganic Chemistry at the University of Adelaide in 1973, and was the Angas Professor of Chemistry at the University of Adelaide from 1982 until his retirement in 2009.

== Scholarship ==
Bruce made many contributions to the chemistry of metal clusters, particularly those of ruthenium.

== Recognition ==
He was elected a Fellow of the Australian Academy of Science in 1989 and was awarded the David Craig Medal and Lecture in 2003.
