= John Murray (sheep breeder) =

John Murray (c. 1812–1886) and his son also named John Murray (1841–1908) were breeders of merino sheep in South Australia.

== John Murray ==
John Murray (c. 1812 – 13 September 1886) was a noted breeder of merino sheep of Murray Vale Estate, Mount Crawford, who with his wife Ellen (née Hope) arrived in South Australia from Scotland on the City of Adelaide on 6 September 1841. His brothers Alexander Borthwick Murray (1816–1903) and Pulteney Malcolm Murray (1819–1879) were also sheep breeders. A third brother, William Murray (1819–1901) was a gardener and jam manufacturer.

At the Agricultural Show of 1846 one of his merino rams won first prize. He won a large number of similar awards in the next 40 years. During that time fleece weights increased from 13½ to 20 lb with no drop in quality. His breeding strategy involved maintaining the "purity" of bloodline, with no cross-breeding. His breeding philosophy was to perfect a line of big-framed merino rams with absolutely no wrinkles and strong constitutions, and to achieve this without introducing other strains. This strategy was followed by the family (and to a large extent by other studs in the State, resulting in a "South Australian type") for something like 75 years with excellent results as fashions ebbed and flowed. A gratifying example of the regard in which this type was held in difficult climates was the purchase of 1000 ewes by D. M. Aitkin, a Queenslander who had been brought in as a judge for the 1912 Royal Show, with an option for a further 2000.

Other major South Australian merino breeders J. H. Angas, E. Bowman, F. H. Dutton, C. B. Fisher, G. C. Hawker, A. McFarlane, George Melrose, A. B. Murray, Edward Stirling (father of Edward Charles Stirling), F. Thomas and the firm of Duffield and Porter (later Koonoona Pty. Ltd.), finally broke the Murrays' near monopoly on Show prizes by the introduction of genetics from the Peppin line as exampled by the purchase in 1913 of the ram Hercules from Wanganella by Walter Hawker of Anama and M. S. Hawker of North Bungaree.

=== Family ===
He was married to Alison Murray née Hope (c. 1820 – 9 June 1895 at Brougham Place). Their children included:

- John Murray (1841 – 4 July 1908)
- Helen (1846 – 24 April 1878 at Mars Hill, Gawler) married James Dawson ( – 14 January 1882) on 27 February 1868
- Esther (1848 – 13 July 1923) married William "Willie" Crozier (c. 1840 – 22 June 1906) of Oaklands and Moorna Station.
- Alison Hope Murray (1852 – 4 July 1894)
- Thomas Hope Murray (1854 – 29 November 1905) married (1) Margaret Prendergast ( – 24 August 1891) (2) Florence Edith Daw (1859–1934) on 2 September 1892. Florence was a daughter of Joseph Daw and Mary née Wood
- Alexander James "Alick" Murray (24 September 1859 – 18 April 1929)
- William Albert Murray (31 July 1862 – 3 December 1901)

The four brothers were involved in sheep breeding both independently and cooperatively at studs of their own, following their father's methods. All in addition bred and rode horses and T. H. Murray and W. A. Murray were pioneering breeders of polled Angas cattle at Cappeedee station.

- John Murray: Rhine Park estate (Eden Valley), 10 miles (16 km) from Mount Pleasant.
- T. Hope Murray: Mount Beevor (8 miles (13 km) east of Nairne)
- Alick J. Murray: Murray Vale, Mount Crawford
- W. A. Murray: Cappeedee station., near Hallett.

== John Murray (jun.) ==
John Murray (1841 – 4 July 1908) was born on board the ship City of Adelaide when his parents were emigrating from Scotland to South Australia, and was brought up at Mount Crawford.

When he married Mary Scott (daughter of Thomas Scott, of "Delorain" near Kersbrook), his father put him in charge of his Rhine Park estate.

He was a successful breeder of merino sheep, evidenced by the number of prizes and championships won by his sheep at the Royal shows and at exhibitions of other prominent agricultural societies. He was generally recognised as one of the best judges of sheep in the State. He was intimately connected with the Royal Agricultural and Horticultural Society of South Australia for a great many years, and in 1901 was appointed president, a position which he held for two years. His brother Alick J. Murray also served as president of the R.A.& H.S.

He was an elder of the Presbyterian Church at Mount Pleasant, and for many years a delegate on the Presbyterian Assembly.

He was appointed J.P. in September 1888.

He died after suffering several years of painful illness. Rhine Park passed into the hands of his son J. L. Murray. (On the death of Willie Murray, according to his will, Cappeedee's lease passed to John Murray son Walter S. Murray and the stock was divided among the other three; Norman Brice took Mount Beevor after the death of Tom Hope Murray and its stock sold off.)

=== Family ===
He married Mary Scott (c. 1843 – 13 September 1926) on 25 April 1867. Their children included:

- Edith Alison (1868 – 5 February 1940) married Alex James McDonald ( – 11 November 1937), manager of Canowie Station, on 30 May 1901
- John Linley Murray (28 January 1872 – 1953)
- Elizabeth Rosina Murray (4 May 1874 – 10 September 1941)
- Walter Scott Murray (8 May 1876 – 21 November 1952) married Ines Kate Goddard on 19 May 1904.
- Helen Murray (16 August 1879 – 16 October 1941)
- (Olive) Mary Murray (8 November 1880 – ) married George Burlingham on 17 September 1919
- (James) Elliott Murray (3 July 1884 – 1971) engaged to Valerie Anne Purves in 1946, married outside SA.
