= Chambers brothers (pastoralists) =

Early settlers in the colony of South Australia

James and John Chambers were early settlers in the colony of South Australia. They left England in 1836, became wealthy pastoralists, and were closely connected with John McDouall Stuart's expeditions across the continent of Australia.

== Overview ==
James and John, sons of William and Elizabeth (née Wilson) Chambers, their wives Catherine and Mary (who were sisters) and their young families were among the first colonists, James arriving on the Coromandel at Holdfast Bay on 17 January 1837. The plan had been that by leaving on an earlier ship James would arrive in plenty of time to organise accommodation for the rest of the family, but unfavourable winds forced the Coromandel to delay its departure until 9 September. The ship was further delayed at Cape Town, partly because insufficient and inferior food supplies had brought about so much illness that Captain William Chesser (died 14 February 1840) feared many passengers would die on the voyage. They arrived 17 January 1837, around two weeks late.

The rest of the family, which included sister Priscilla Chambers, had a trouble-free voyage in the James Renwick, arriving off Largs Bay on 10 February 1837. Catherine and Mary's brother James Redin also emigrated, arriving with his wife on the Navarino on 21 February 1856.

Margaret Goyder Kerr, in her book Colonial Dynasty – the Chambers family of South Australia, makes the point that the two men were physically quite different, both in build and temperament, and John wore a green satin patch over his blind right eye, so would never be confused by contemporaries. The historian however has great difficulty: they both signed their names "J. Chambers" and were involved in similar (and often the same) activities so that it is difficult if not impossible at many points to determine which brother is involved.

== James Chambers ==
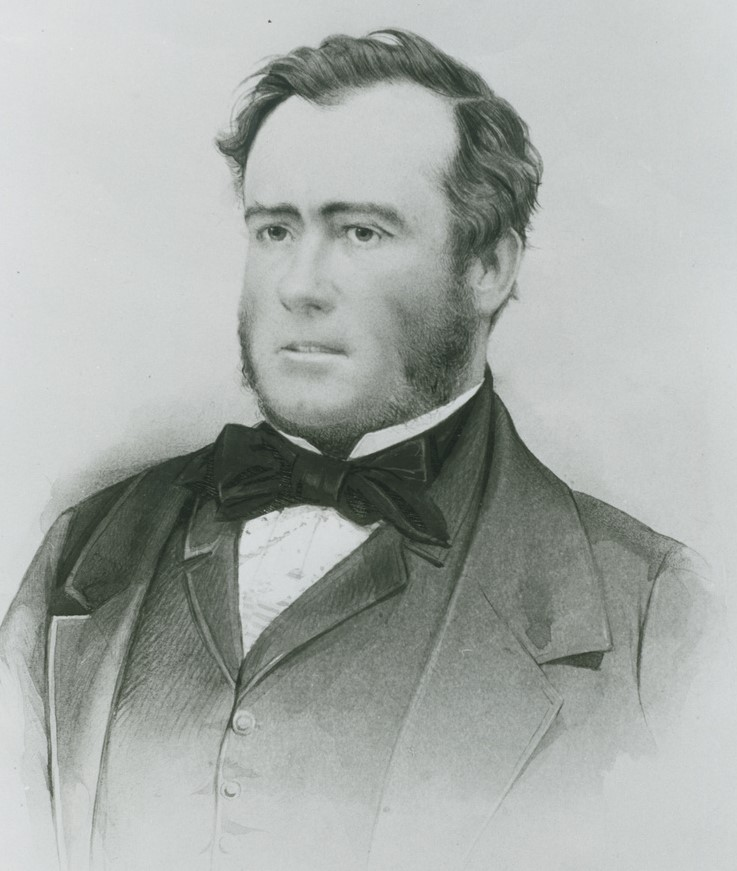
James Chambers

James Chambers "Jemmy" (21 September 1811 – 7 August 1862), born in Ponders End, London was a successful grazier and pastoralist in South Australia; with brother John a major sponsor of John McDouall Stuart's expeditions across the continent.

He was the first to drive a team of bullocks between Adelaide and Port Adelaide, and Adelaide and Glenelg, effectively creating the Port Road and Bay Road. He ran sheep on a commonage licence in the area now known as Coromandel Valley.

He bought a town acre at the first land sale, and imported horses from Van Diemens Land (he and brother John had experience as horse dealers in England)

They built a house on Montefiore Hill in North Adelaide, at the site later occupied by John Langdon Bonython's Carclew.

He opened a livery stable in North Adelaide, He bought bullocks and wagons from Cape Town and coaches from England, he tendered successfully for the mail contract to Burra around 1845 (endorsed by postmaster-general John Watts) and built a substantial business carrying passengers to the mining areas north of Adelaide, including Gawler's expeditions into the country.

He provided the horses and carts for Alexander Tolmer's gold escort from Mount Alexander to Adelaide in 1852.

He was involved with the South Australian Jockey Club, and served as Clerk of Course in 1850.

He sold his business to Simms & Hayter in 1853 for around £14,000 and holidayed in Long Sutton, Lincolnshire, where he had gained his horse-dealing experience. With his new-found knowledge of what was needed in South Australia, he was able to return in 1856 on the ship Albuera with a useful selection of horses, cattle and sheep.

He and John dissolved their partnership and between 1854 and 1857 sold 1700 sq. miles (4403 km²) for £48,000, retaining 270 sq. miles (699 km²) in the north.

=== Mining ===
James and his business partner William Finke found copper on one of their northern properties and on 23 July 1857 were issued with lease no 5 on some eighty acres that became known as the Oratunga Mine.

He and Finke founded "Great Northern Copper Mining Company" and sold eleven mines, most notably Nuccaleena and Oratunga No.2 to that company, which originally consisted of eleven shareholders. The floating of the Great Northern Mining Company on the London Stock Exchange in 1860 was marked by irregularities, shady deals, deception and outright fraud. The first application for mining leases was refused by the Commissioner of Crown Lands Charles Bonney, but his replacement John Bentham Neales, M.P. took it on himself not only to grant them without going through the normal procedures, such as checking claims of the proponents, gaining approval from Major Freeling of the Survey Department (who objected to both applications), the Lands Office, and obtaining the signatures of the Chief Secretary and the Governor, but personally rushed the signed form to mining captains John Hart, George F. Dashwood, and Thomas Hancock (manager of the North Rhine Mining Company and secretary of Great Northern), as their ship to London was waiting on the tide at Glenelg. The prospectus they prepared gave an unrealistic picture of the ore bodies, falsely claimed the Government was planning a railway to the mine (the survey was to Mount Remarkable), that the Burra proprietors had offered a large sum for the mine, and that it had the Governor (Sir Richard MacDonnell)'s endorsement, and falsely named John Morphett as a director. While the float was underway, ownership of the leases passed from Chambers and Finke to John Baker M.L.C. and Paxton.

In the parliamentary enquiry under Townsend which followed, James Chambers refused to answer questions, Finke avoided it by travelling interstate, Baker claimed parliamentary privilege and absented himself, and Neales claimed he was following a precedent. The directors judiciously reduced their holdings from 1500 shares each to 200 or 300 while prices were buoyant.

=== Exploration ===
He largely outfitted John McDouall Stuart for four of his six northern expeditions, brother John claiming to have supplied everything for the first, (though Stuart credited William Finke) and the Government providing for the sixth. This last expedition set out with great ceremony on 25 October 1861 from James's residence on Montefiore Hill, North Adelaide, where he died of complications from a carbuncle without learning of its successful outcome.

=== Family ===
James Chambers married Catherine Redin (17 May 1809 – 20 June 1875) of Newton, Lincolnshire, in England on 6 August 1836. It is not known whether she came to Australia on the Coromandel or the James Renwick a month later. Her sister married John Chambers; her brother James Watson Redin (15 April 1813 – 22 August 1871) also emigrated, lived at Aldinga, South Australia. The children of James and Catherine were:

- Elizabeth Chambers (1837 – 18 April 1882) married John Holden Newman (1835 – 11 November 1863) on 21 January 1862. Elizabeth married again, to Edward John Peake on 29 June 1867. It is not known whether she had any further children.
  - Elizabeth Catherine Newman (19 December 1862 – 25 April 1864)
  - John Holden Newman jnr. (13 March 1864 – 29 August 1911) married Beatrice Emma Tate (daughter of professor Ralph Tate) and moved to England.
- James Chambers jnr. (1839–1893) residence "Wattaburrie" Port Elliot, married Emily Norall (c. 1840 – 19 January 1918)
  - Emily Chambers (4 February 1867 – )
  - Catherine Chambers (6 March 1869 – c. 22 September 1949) married surveyor Walter Robert Gething ( – 10 June 1934) on 30 December 1899; moved to Mica Street, then Wolfram Street, Broken Hill. She returned to Adelaide in 1939, eight years after her husband, who died there in 1934.
  - James Chambers (5 January 1877 – ) married Mary Alice Provis ( – 6 October 1943) on 20 January 1900 had a son 27 December 1903. She later married Fred Sinden.
- Catherine Chambers (1843–1904) married her cousin, auctioneer John Barker ( – 21 May 1925) on 11 March 1872. The town of Katherine, Northern Territory was named after her.
  - Alfred Edward Barker ( – 25 June 1925)
  - Priscilla Mary Barker (1883 – 11 June 1918)
  - Eleanor Kate Barker ( – 2 August 1954)
- Anna Chambers (9 December 1845 – 2 October 1907) married Peleg Whitford Jackson (c. 1834 – 24 April 1912) on 25 November 1869, previously of the firms Victorian Coach Company, Cobb & Co and Murray & Jackson, steamboat proprietors. They lived variously in Albury, New South Wales, Charleville, Queensland, Beechworth, Victoria and Brighton, Victoria and had six children.
- Hugh Chambers (1848 – 20 December 1893) married Agnes May Ward (c. 1847 – 26 May 1923) on 3 December 1872 and lived at the family residence on Montefiore Hill.
  - Hugh Lindsay Chambers (3 October 1873 – 30 October 1873)
  - Nina Chambers (13 September 1874 – 1955) of Prospect, was a prominent Prospect socialite
  - Ruby Chambers (28 March 1876 – 21 September 1934) of 4 Robe Terrace, Medindie, was also a prominent socialite
  - Rita Gay Chambers (16 December 1879 – 1949) married John Whinham Packard (1878–1951) on 28 October 1905
  - Alan Ward Chambers (27 August 1881 – 27 January 1943) moved to Whakatane, New Zealand
  - Stuart Hansford Chambers (13 November 1883 – 1969) married Ruby Rogers Skinner (died 1967) on 3 June 1911.

=== Barker & Chambers ===
John Barker and Catherine, Hugh Chambers and Agnes, formed the company Barker and Chambers, with major property investments "Comongin Holdings" in Queensland, later became McLean & Barker & Co.

They ran the "horse bazaar" on Sturt Street, Adelaide, also on Grenfell Street and Gay's Arcade, which in November 1884 was destroyed by fire and rebuilt as part of Adelaide Arcade.

When cattle dealer Edward Meade Bagot (1822 – 27 July 1886) (founder of Bagot, Shakes and Lewis), disappeared in 1886, John Barker organised the search party.

=== Recognition ===
Chambers Creek and Chambers Hill (in the Adelaide Hills) were named for James Chambers.

Chambers Pillar, River Chambers, and Chambers Range in Central Australia were named for James by Stuart. Chambers Creek in the Hundred of Noarlunga, and Mount Chambers Gorge near Lake Frome were named after James and John.

Chambers Bay, which Stuart originally named Elizabeth Bay, east of present-day Darwin, where the British flag was first raised, was named for his eldest daughter Elizabeth by Stuart. It was named Chambers Bay to thank the sisters for making a large flag for Stuart.

Katherine River (and hence the town Katherine) was named for his second daughter Catherine.

Anna Creek, after which Anna Creek Station was named, was named for James Chambers' daughter Anna, by Peter Warburton in 1858. (Note: Note: As of 1 November 2025, both this website and the "Names of Railway Stations" article appear to be in error; an 1870 court case held after James' death clearly lists his four children, one of whom is Anna.) Anna's Reservoir was also named for Anna.

== John Chambers ==
John Chambers (1814? 1815? – 26 September 1889), born in Ponders End, Middlesex, was a successful grazier and pastoralist in South Australia.

Both he and brother James were livestock dealers in East Dereham, Norfolk, following their father's profession. He arrived in the colony of South Australia in the John Renwick on 10 February 1837 with wife Mary, brother Benjamin and sister Priscilla shortly after his brother James.

He and his bullock dray were called on to assist the party of William Light, John Morphett and John Hack, which explored the area between Holdfast Bay and Aldinga in June 1838. He claimed to have done the first ploughing in Adelaide (for Boyle Travers Finniss; another claimant was Donald McLean) and to have built the first Adelaide house with a fireplace, door and glass window. He also practised as a farrier and speculated as a dealer but over-reached himself in 1851 and John and Mary settled down on settled on 1200 acres (486 ha) in Cherry Gardens to run sheep.

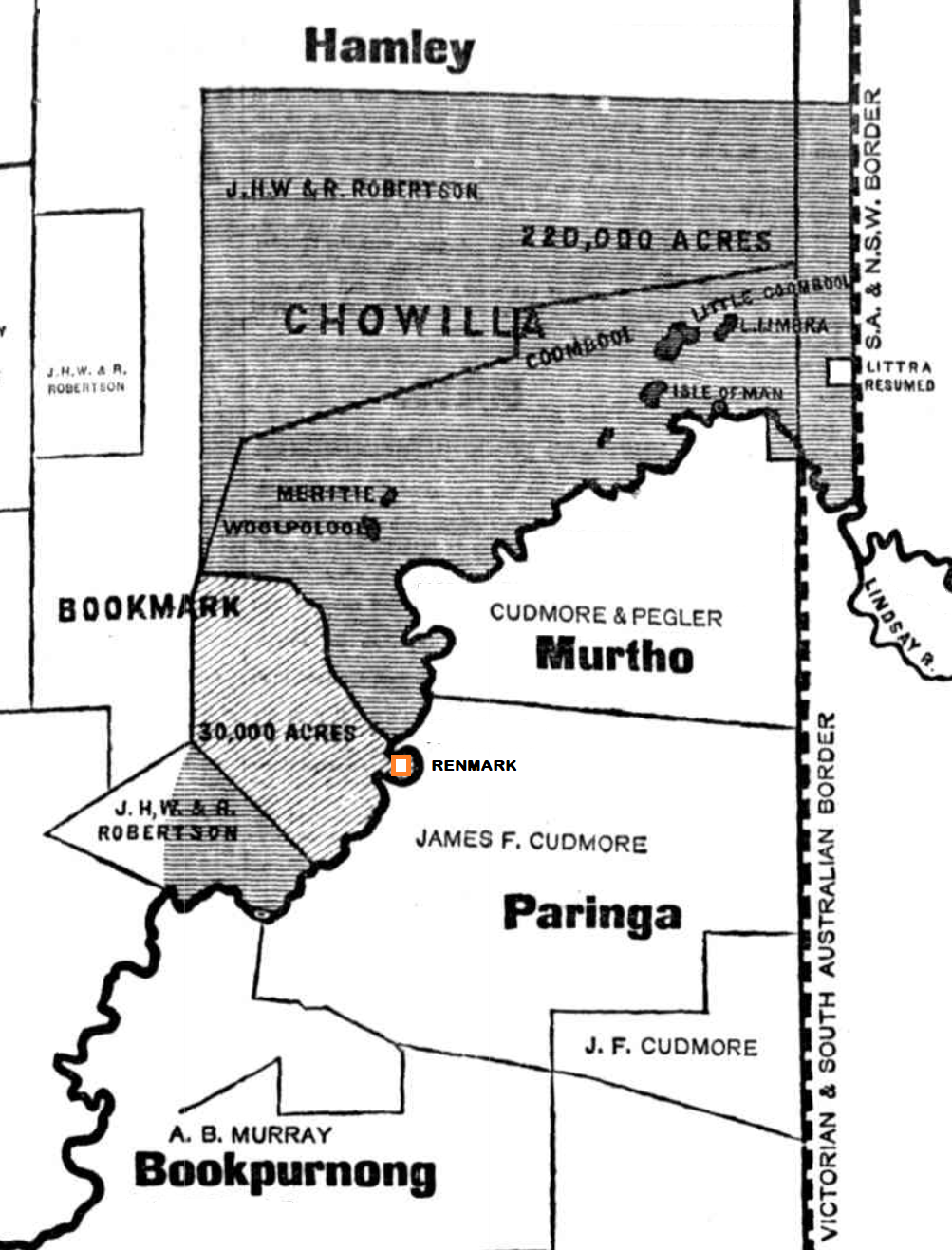
Upper Murray in 1887; the approximate location of Renmark has been added. The diagonally shaded area of Bookmark was taken over by Chaffey for irrigation.

In 1846 he took up land around Lake Bonney to run sheep, then formally converted it to leasehold in 1851, setting up a head station at Cobdogla, managed by James Trussell, successfully breeding horses and cattle. The two brothers took up the lease of the station pioneered by Fisher and Handcock near the present-day Renmark in 1858 and in 1859 William Finke took up another section in the area, creating two stations, "Bookmark" and "Chowilla".

John and James Chambers dissolved their partnership and between 1854 and 1857 sold 1700 sq. miles (4400 km²) for £48,000.

Around 1860 John Chambers took over Finke's lease, installing James Redin as manager.
He sold much of his landholdings in 1863, so avoiding losses in great drought. He sold Bookmark and Chowilla to Richard Holland, who five years later passed them on to his stepsons William and Robert Robertson. In 1887 the South Australian government resumed part of Bookmark for the Chaffey brothers' irrigation development and the town of Renmark.

With brother James, he set up a headquarters at Mount Samuel, which Herschel Babbage used as a base for exploring the Flinders Ranges for prospective sites.

He took up leases at Pekina, Mount Remarkable, Moolooloo (managed by John Rose), Bobmoonie and Oratunga (managed by George Warland), Wirrealpa, Stuart Creek and Cournamont.

He had mining leases around Blinman, South Australia.

It was John who formed the idea of sponsoring John McDouall Stuart's expeditions across the continent. He supplied horses and provisions, and his employees formed Stuart's party.

He died aged 74 at his home on the Bay Road, near Richmond, South Australia.

=== Family ===
John married Mary Redin (c. 1812 – 24 March 1904) in October 1836. Their children included:

- Fanny Chambers (1841 – 30 December 1915) married stockbroker Alfred Francis Weaver ( – 27 April 1921) on 29 June 1876
- Charles Chambers (1843 – 24 June 1877) married Mary Jane Ransford (1849–1925) on 30 April 1873

- Edgar Charles Chambers (1875 – 2 February 1910) was manager West End Brewery in Broken Hill.

- Mary Chambers (1846 – 5 December 1925) married Frederick James Blades (c. 1830 – 16 November 1895) on 16 June 1869.
- William Chambers (1849 – 23 May 1930) married Clara Bailey (c. 1854 – 1937) on 19 April 1877; they had three children.

William was briefly manager of one of his father's stations. He was a partner in the brewing firm of Chambers and Blades, which owned the Dragon Brewery, Green Dragon Hotel, the Tanner's Arms in Unley and the Queen's Head in the city. Other partners were brother Charles Chambers and brother-in-law F. J. Blades.

- Priscilla Chambers (c. 1852 – 17 November 1924) married Alfred Simms (c. 1854 – 30 May 1901), son of William Knox Simms, on 17 June 1874

She married again, to Harry Bickford (1843–1927) on 8 December 1904. Neither had any children.

- Ellen Chambers (1854 – 30 July 1932) married lawyer Alfred R(obert) B(lockley) Lucas (c. 1856 – 1 June 1901) on 18 June 1885

The Chambers brothers had a hands-off management style; their success owed much to their choice of employees: James Trussell (1826–1895) managed Cobdogla Station for 45 years.

Neither brother was involved in public affairs; John was a popular member of the Adelaide Hunt Club and owned the Richmond House racing stables; both were involved in horse racing.

=== Recognition ===
John McDouall Stuart named the Mary River and the Fanny River for his daughters, and the William River for his second son. The Fanny and Fanny Springs were also named for Fanny.

William Creek, after whom the town of William Creek was named, was named for children of John Chambers' son William, by John McDouall Stuart.

No support has been found for the assertion in a 1915 article in The Register that Edwards Creek was named for a son of John Chambers by surveyor Lee in 1883.

== Benjamin Chambers ==
Benjamin Chambers (c. 1808 – May 1852) and his wife Emily (6 August 1810 – ) lived in Tombland, Norwich before emigrating with brother John on the John Renwick.

He settled on a farm somewhere in the Upper Sturt / Cherry Gardens / Coromandel Valley area and played no major part in public affairs. There is circumstantial evidence that he was partner with his brother John in managing the Pekina run. There is no information available on his offspring, if any.

== Priscilla Chambers ==
Priscilla Chambers (1816 – 31 December 1900) arrived with brother John on the John Renwick on 10 February 1837

In 1842 she married Alfred Barker (1812 – 24 January 1880) who had been an officer on the Rapid, and settled at Yankalilla.

They moved to Burra when he ran the Burra Hotel, then took over the Baldina Run station in 1862.

He died at Baldina House, St. John's Wood, now part of Prospect, South Australia; she died at Henley Beach, South Australia

=== Family ===
- eldest son William Pitt Barker (c. 1844 – 17 February 1914) married Jane Young of Kooringa, South Australia on 26 May 1875, lived at nearby Baldina station. Part owner of Comongin Station
- second son John Barker (1847 – 10 November 1919?) married Catherine Chambers on 11 March 1872. Together with John Chambers, they formed the partnership of Barker and Chambers, major landholders in Queensland.
- eldest daughter Mary Barker ( – ) married Donald MacLean on 21 June 1866
- Priscilla Barker (1853–1931) married Gustav Wilhelm Moritz von Rieben (died 1933) on 21 April 1892

=== Recognition ===
Priscilla Creek was named for this daughter of John.

== James Redin ==
James Watson Redin (15 April 1813 – 22 August 1871) was a brother of Catherine and Mary Chambers, born in Newton Hall, Lincolnshire. He had been booked on the James Renwick in 1837 but withdrew at the last moment. According to Margaret Goyder Kerr (op. cit.) he never joined his relations in Australia but this is contradicted by the evidence: he arrived in South Australia c. 1855.

His brother Thomas Redin (1814–) was booked on the John Renwick voyage of 1836 but no more information is available as yet.

=== Family ===
He married Susan (c. 1808 – 23 November 1870) and had a home at Crowder Street, Lower Mitcham, South Australia and at Aldinga, South Australia Their children included:

- James Redin (c. 1840 – 9 June 1905) married Emma Coles (c. 1842 – 1932) daughter of Alfred Coles, of Aldinga on 9 January 1863; worked on John Chambers' Bookmark station on the River Murray (later the site of the Chaffey brothers' irrigation experiments), was involved in a railway accident c. 1890 and retired to Campbelltown.
  - Alfred J. Redin ( – ) eldest son of James Redin, married Lilian E. M. (W. E.?) Swansborough on 31 December 1888, perhaps the A. Redin who had a horse Defamation in 1893.
- Horatio Redin (1841 – 26 November 1880) second son of the late James Redin of Hackney
  - Horatio Samuel Redin (1865 – July 1887), athlete and reporter with South Australian Advertiser, died of pneumonia. Father at Palm Place, Hackney.
- Walter Newton ( – ), third son of James Redin of Palm Place, Hackney, married Lucy Elizabeth Edwards on 22 February 1899
- W. Redin was a reporter and cricketer in the early 1890s. was this Walter Newton?
- M. E. Redin had a wheat farm in 1901.

== See also ==
- Bowman brothers
- Robertson brothers (pastoralists)
