= Mount Beevor =

Mountain in South Australia

- Location within South Australia

Highest point
- Elevation: 503 m (1,650 ft)
- Coordinates: 34°56′S 139°02′E

Geography
- Location: South Australia, Australia
- Parent range: Mount Lofty Ranges

Mount Beevor is one of the highest peaks on the eastern flank of the central Mount Lofty Ranges in South Australia with height of 503 metres.

== Geography ==
Mount Beevor is a rounded prominence forming part of a north-south trending ridge, about 30 km east of Mount Lofty and 18 km north east of Mount Barker. The western slopes are the steepest.

The headwaters of the Bremer River collect beside the western base of Mount Beevor before flowing southward into Lake Alexandrina. Geologically, it is about mid-way along the north-south running Bremer Fault Scarp.

The junction of the boundaries of the following localities all coincide with its summit - Harrogate, Rockleigh and Tungkillo which are all located within the cadastral units of the County of Sturt and the Hundred of Monarto.

== Climate ==
Rainfall is low. The district was noted among early pioneers for being somewhat waterless. The peak, often windy, can be bleak, foggy, and bitterly cold in winter, providing little shelter from the elements. Heavy snowstorms thickly blanketed Mount Beevor in July 1901. In contrast, summer thunderstorms can wash out nearby roads, turning watercourses into torrents. During such events very little water was captured in the landscape in its natural state, causing severe downstream flooding, particularly along the Bremer River. In between these extremes there are sometimes stretches of fine weather affording views over ridges and spurs strewn with wildflowers.

== History ==
The Indigenous inhabitants of this district were the Peramangk people but their name for the mount is unknown. Because of the barren nature of the mount their nomadic visits were relatively brief and rare.

The first Europeans to discover and visit the mount was the expedition of Dr George Imlay and John Hill on 25 January 1838. They were returning on horseback to Adelaide from Mannum after being the first to reach the Murray overland within South Australia and had initially mistaken the peak for Mount Barker. Despite having realised their mistake they did not name it.

The present name originates from Captain Beevor, a former British Army soldier who in late 1839 was the first European settler in this district. He pioneered a sheep run there, with his head station near the southern base of the mount and his shepherds’ huts scattered all round. In 1844 Beevor moved to pioneer a sheep run on Eyre Peninsula, being speared to death there in 1849.

Subsequent pastoralists included the Murray family, whose Mount Beevor Estate became noted as one of the best wool producing properties in South Australia and an outstanding merino breeding establishment. The family of Thomas Hope Murray (1854-1905) lived there in an up-to-date homestead comprising fifteen spacious rooms. From 1906 Norman Edward Brice (1864-1927) and family continued the high reputation of Mount Beevor Estate.

== Economy ==
Mount Beevor is located in an agricultural district. The slopes of the mount, which are mostly rock-studded grassland with clusters of remnant eucalyptus woodland, are utilised for livestock grazing.

In recent decades the summit has become important for communications. Transmission towers are located there to provide broadcast and relay capacities throughout the district for Telstra, mobile phone providers, Emergency Services, and C.B. Radio. A vehicular track allows servicing of these facilities but is closed to public vehicles.

Bushwalking tourism is a more recent development. On clear days there are outstanding panoramic views from Mount Beevor summit. It has therefore become an important staging point along the Lavender Federation Trail, a recreational walking trail running between Murray Bridge and Clare.
