= William Rounsevell =

Cornish businessman (c.1816–1874)

William Rounsevell (c. 1816 – 5 October 1874) was a businessman of Cornish origins who founded a livery stable and mail coach business in the early years of colonial South Australia. His sons John Rounsevell (c.1836–1902) and Ben Rounsevell (1842–1923) were prominent businessmen, pastoralists and politicians in South Australia.

== The emigrants ==
Four children of John Rounsevell (c. 1780 – 6 November 1856) and Jenny (née Herring) (c. 1779 – 23 March 1858) of Boscastle, Cornwall emigrated to South Australia:

- John Rounsevell (c. 1811 – 30 September 1885) and his wife Elizabeth (née Popplestone or Poplestone) (c. 1811 – 19 October 1877) and their daughter Mary Jane (later Mrs August Meyer) arrived aboard City of Adelaide in July 1839. They settled at "Tara" at Little Hampton and had a large family.
- Mary (c. 1813 – ), with her husband James Turner aboard Royal Admiral in January 1838.
- William Rounsevell, the subject of this article, with wife Grace (née Rowe) and son John aboard City of Adelaide in July 1839
- Jane (c. 1823 – ), with her husband Isaac Coad (c. 1816 – 30 June 1895) and son John arrived aboard Cleveland in December 1839. They settled at Strathalbyn.

== History ==
William Rounsevell, with his wife Grace (née Rowe) and son John (c. 1836 – 15 May 1902), emigrated from Boscastle in his native Cornwall, on the City of Adelaide, arriving on 6 July 1839, having been persuaded to emigrate by Sir Rowland Hill. William was a farmer, but having brought pit saws with him, proceeded immediately to fell and saw timber for the South Australia Company. He then joined the police force, soon reaching the rank of senior sergeant but resigned after a few years, perhaps in 1842.

While still working as a policeman for the South Australia Company, he purchased land on Pirie Street, Adelaide, where he established a stables and horse letting business, then in 1852 tried his luck at the Victorian gold diggings. On his return, he began running stagecoaches, a business which progressively grew until it was the largest such owned by any man in Australia. He was a ruthless operator, taking over profitable routes by buying up competitors who were prepared to sell, and driving others out of business by providing extras such as breakfasts and undercutting their fares to the point, if necessary, of running a free service. He took on mail contracting, and business ran profitably until December 1866, when he sold out to Cobb & Co, who took over services on 1 January 1867. The office he set up in Ackland Street passed to Cobb & Co., then served for their successors John Hill & Co. Ltd., Graves, Hill & Co., and finally Fewster & Co.

To provide feed for the horses, Rounsevell grew hay in various locations around Adelaide, the most productive of which was some 400 acres (160 ha) at Glenside on the site later became the Parkside Lunatic Asylum. The land was owned by Sir Rowland Hill and Nathaniel Knox and managed by John Howard Clark. Similar farms were established at Kingston, Mount Barker, Nairne, Willunga and Wild Horse Plains. Among the grasses grown were perennial ryegrass and ribleaf or lamb's tongue, now both endemic weeds, which he may have been responsible for introducing to South Australia. He was the first to install a steam-powered chaff-cutter.

In 1870 he bought David Randall's Mount Crawford property "Glenparra" or "Glen Para" for £15,000 and renamed it "Corryton Park". It was eventually sold to Charles Gebhardt of Gawler. Later owners were H. G. Lillecrapp then Lachlan McBean.

He purchased a house which he named "Tremere" ("by the sea"), from R. B. Colley at Glenelg, the dining hall of which had been used as the original Glenelg Town Hall, and enlarged it substantially. He leased the mansion to the Government for the duration of several of his overseas trips, and it was there that Lady Daly died.

William Rounsevell died as a result of a heart attack after suffering from heart disease for some time.

== Family ==
He married twice; his second marriage, some time before 1842, was to Mary Palmer. Children by both marriages included:

- John Rounsevell (c. 1836 – 15 May 1902), politician and horseman, married four times and had a large family.
- William Benjamin "Ben" Rounsevell (23 September 1842 – 18 July 1923), politician and sportsman, married Louisa Ann Carvosso (c. 1826 – c. 21 August 1912) on 14 March 1864. They had no children.

Mary Rounsevell married again, on 14 December 1878, to Richard Langman (c. 1818 – 19 November 1891).

== Bibliography ==
Rounsevell, James Corryton (1992), The Rounsevell family in early South Australia (2nd ed.), J.C. Rounsevell
