= Philip Levi =

Australian settler and pastoralist

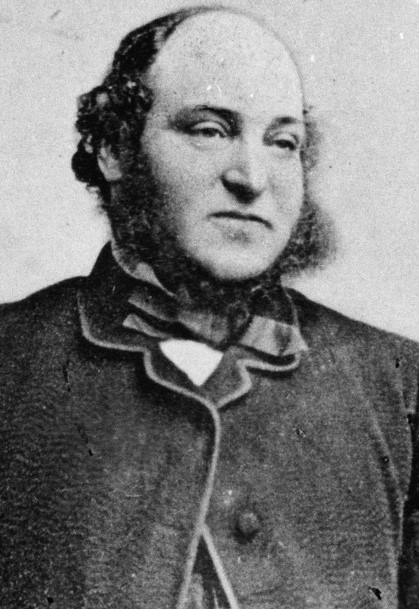
- Born: 1 February 1822; Brixton, Surrey, England
- Died: 13 May 1898 (aged 76); Vale Park, South Australia
- Resting place: West Terrace Cemetery
- Occupation: pastoralist
- Partner: Elizabeth Perry Symes
- Children: Anthony Symes (1844–1848), James Frederick Levi (1846–1878), Edmund Phillip Symes Levi (1848–1848), Charles Symes Levi (1849–1900), Andrew Philip Levi (1851–1927), Edmund Symes Levi (1853–1877), Adelaide Phillipi Field (1855–1930), Caroline Elizabeth Symes (1857–1857), George Nathaniel Levi (1862–1897), Caroline Elizabeth Symes Levi (1864–1864), Frederick Symes Levi (1865–1887)
- Parent(s): Nathan Philip Levi (1790–1843) and Sarah nee Goldsmid (1795–1889)
- Relatives: Charles Knight (husband of partner's sister)

Philip Levi (1 February 1822 – 13 May 1898) was an early settler and pastoralist of South Australia.

Born at Brixton Hill, Surrey, England, Levi arrived in South Australia at the age of sixteen, aboard the Eden in 1838 with his parents Nathaniel Philip Levi and Sarah Levi (née Goldsmid), and their five other children. He was involved in pastoral and mercantile businesses in the north of South Australia and became a well known and influential businessman. His pastoral interests involved sheep and cattle in various partnerships, many of which in the period 1855–1870 involved Alfred Watts (1815–1884). His shipping interests included, with Jacob Smith, a share in the Port Adelaide tug Goolwa. He was in 1863 one of the founders and a trustee of the Adelaide Club, where a portrait of him still hangs today.

In 1853, Levi purchased Vale House, located near the River Torrens, east of Adelaide (now in the suburb of Vale Park). Over the next 96 years, it became one of the centres of social activity of Adelaide society.

In 1870 Levi's Company disposed of many of its properties including Moolooloo and Wirrealpa, Oulnina and Wadnaminga, Mount Margaret and Booleroo Station. Together these properties were stocked with over 70,000 sheep and 3,000 cattle.

He died at Vale House and was buried in the Jewish section of the West Terrace Cemetery, where his father was the first to be interred. His estate passed on to other members of his family, and in 1947, his niece left Vale House and the adjoining land to the Town of Walkerville for the purposes of a public park. The house is today a part of Levi Caravan Park, which bears his name.

== Family ==
His parents were Nathan Philip Levi (1794–21 Jul 1843 Adelaide, South Australia, Australia) and Sarah (nee Goldsmid) (1799–14 March 1889 Torrens, South Australia, Australia).

Philip Levi's (1822–1898) and Elizabeth Symes' (c. 1822 – 24 November 1882) children included:

- James Frederick Levi (c. 1846 – 24 October 1878). He died at Bridgewater after being thrown onto the Mount Barker Road in a vehicle accident when his horse stumbled.
- Charles Levi (c. 1849 – 18 April 1900) worked at Port Essington and Melville Island in the Northern Territory, died at Port Lincoln.
- Andrew Philip Levi (c. 1851 – 9 November 1927) of Port Adelaide
- Adelaide Philippi Levi (1855 – 23 July 1930) married James William Field
- George Nathaniel Levi (c. 1862 – 19 September 1894) worked for J & A. G. Johnston, of Oakbank

Edmund Levi (6 Nov 1827 London, London, England – 29 September 1895) was a brother and business partner.
