= Adelaide Polo Club =

Polo club in Adelaide, Australia

The Adelaide Polo Club is a polo club in Adelaide, South Australia, Australia.

== Location ==
The Adelaide Polo Club is located at 202 Pfeiffer Road, Woodside. A town in the Adelaide Hills.

== History ==
The Adelaide Polo Club was founded by William Horn in 1879 at Montefiore Hill in Adelaide, South Australia. John Lancelot Stirling, a politician and grazier, also helped found the club. He was an early captain of the club.

On 16 April 1881, the club hosted its first match with other teams from the British Empire. A crowd of 4,000 onlookers attended the match. It took place at the Old Victoria Park Racecourse. The club returned to its original location at Montefiore Hill, until it moved to new grounds at Birkalla, now known as Plympton, another suburb of Adelaide.

Frank Hagger Downer (18 October 1863 – 19 March 1938), the son of Henry Edward Downer, was captain of the club at the time of his death in 1938. Moreover, Sir Arthur Campbell Rymill, a lawyer and politician, was a member of the club.

In 1960, the club moved to Waterloo Corner, another suburb of Adelaide. In 2000, it moved to its current location in Mount Barker.

It is a member of the South Australian Polo Association.
