= John Rounsevell =

Australian politician (c.1836–1902)

John Rounsevell (c. 1836 – 15 May 1902) was a pastoralist and politician in the British colony of South Australia. His brother William Benjamin "Ben" Rounsevell was also a South Australian politician.

== History ==
John Rounsevell was born in Landunna, in Altarnun, Cornwall, and came out to South Australia with his parents William and Grace Rounsevell on City of Adelaide arriving on 6 July 1839. He was educated at St Peter's College, then started working for his father's livery stable and mail coach business, becoming a partner with responsibility for operations north of Kapunda. He became an expert horseman and a foremost exponent of the whip.

He retired from "the road" when the company was sold to Cobb and Co. He managed his father's property Corryton Park (which he later inherited) near Mount Crawford and turned his attention to filling government contracts. He supplied sleepers for railway work and supervised construction of the 500-mile (800 km) section of the Adelaide to Darwin telegraph line north from Port Augusta, and supplied a great number of its telegraph poles as well as large numbers of horses, bullocks and camels for the project.

In 1864 he took up pastoral country in the vicinity of the Warburton Range and lying to the north-east and south-east of it, and erected the trig point on Rounsevell Hill, to the north-west. He also named Gibraltar, the large granite outcrop in the district, and Sturt's Rock, named for the number of Sturt peas in the neighbourhood.

He turned his attention to sheepfarming, at Corryton Park, successfully breeding stud sheep, while his wool clips had a good reputation both in South Australia and in London.

== Politics ==
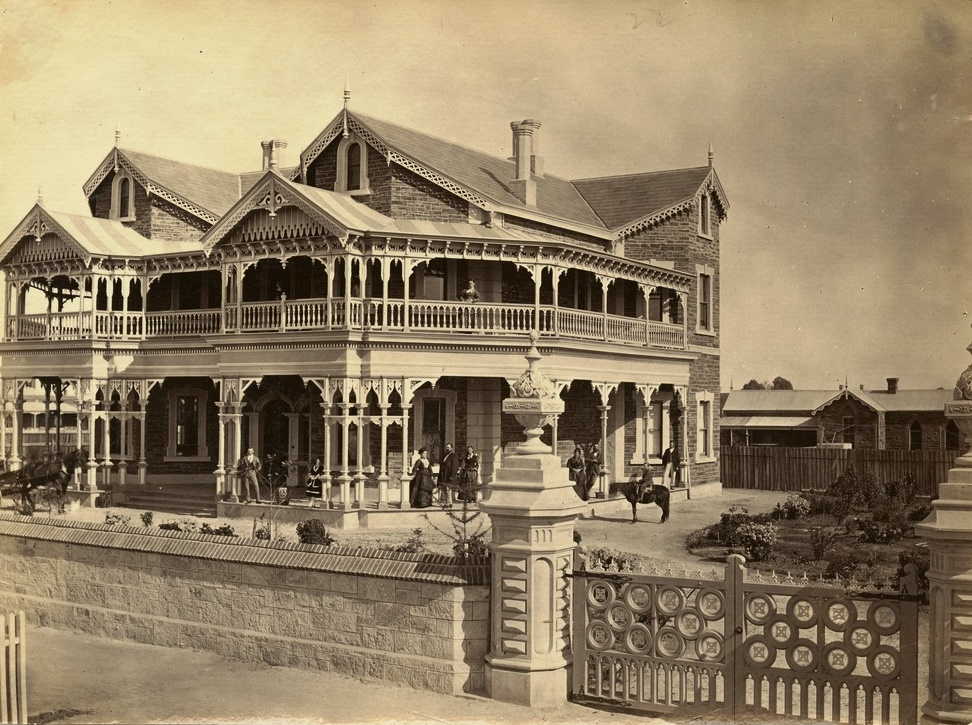
Landunna c. 1872

In 1865 John Rounsevell was elected as a member of the South Australian House of Assembly for the district of Light, but he retired two years later.

Subsequently he was elected for the district of Gumeracha, serving from 1865 to 1868 and again from 1880 until 1881.

He served in the Adelaide City Council. His residence "Landunna" at 111 Hutt Street (Angas Street corner) became home of the Naval, Military & Air Force Club of South Australia Inc. in 1957. The cannon in its grounds once belonged to HMS Buffalo, the ship that brought Governor Hindmarsh to South Australia.

== Family ==
He was married four times: to Emma Hart (c. 1841 – 2 July 1876) on 4 February 1857, Eliza Hart (c. 1842 – 5 August 1881) on 29 September 1877, Elizabeth Jane Coombs (1856 – 1 December 1886) on 3 December 1881, and Sarah Coombs (1859 – c. 1932) (sister of Elizabeth) on 13 June 1887. Their children included:

- Emma Adelaide Rounsevell (25 March 1859 – 13 September 1863) born Kapunda
- (John) William Henry Rounsevell (1860 – 9 April 1893)
- Emma (Eliza) Victoria Rounsevell ( – 8 July 1929) married Augustus Samuel Beaumont (April 1847 – 24 March 1931) on 5 March 1879
- Florence Victoria Maria Rounsevell (1865 – 23 April 1950) married solicitor Thomas Gepp (c. 1809 – 17 November 1894) on 25 October 1884.
- Horace Vernon Rounsevell (20 March 1867 – c. 8 May 1919) married Clara Rachel Coombs (1866–1937) on 8 June 1912. He was a partner in the firm of Symon, Rounsevell, & Cleland.
- Ruby Rounsevell (17 February 1883 – 1965) married (Walter) Charles Wurm (later Weston) (1872–) on 12 November 1910
- Harold Rounsevell (4 February 1885 – 1893)
- Reginald Rounsevell (1886–1945) was on the staff of the Bank of Australasia
- Benjamin Corryton Rounsevell (1889–1933)
- Clara Myrtle Rounsevell (1895–1971)
- John Corryton Rounsevell (1897–1968)
