= Wirrealpa =

Pastoral lease in South Australia

Coordinates: 31.127°S 138.961°E

Location in South Australia

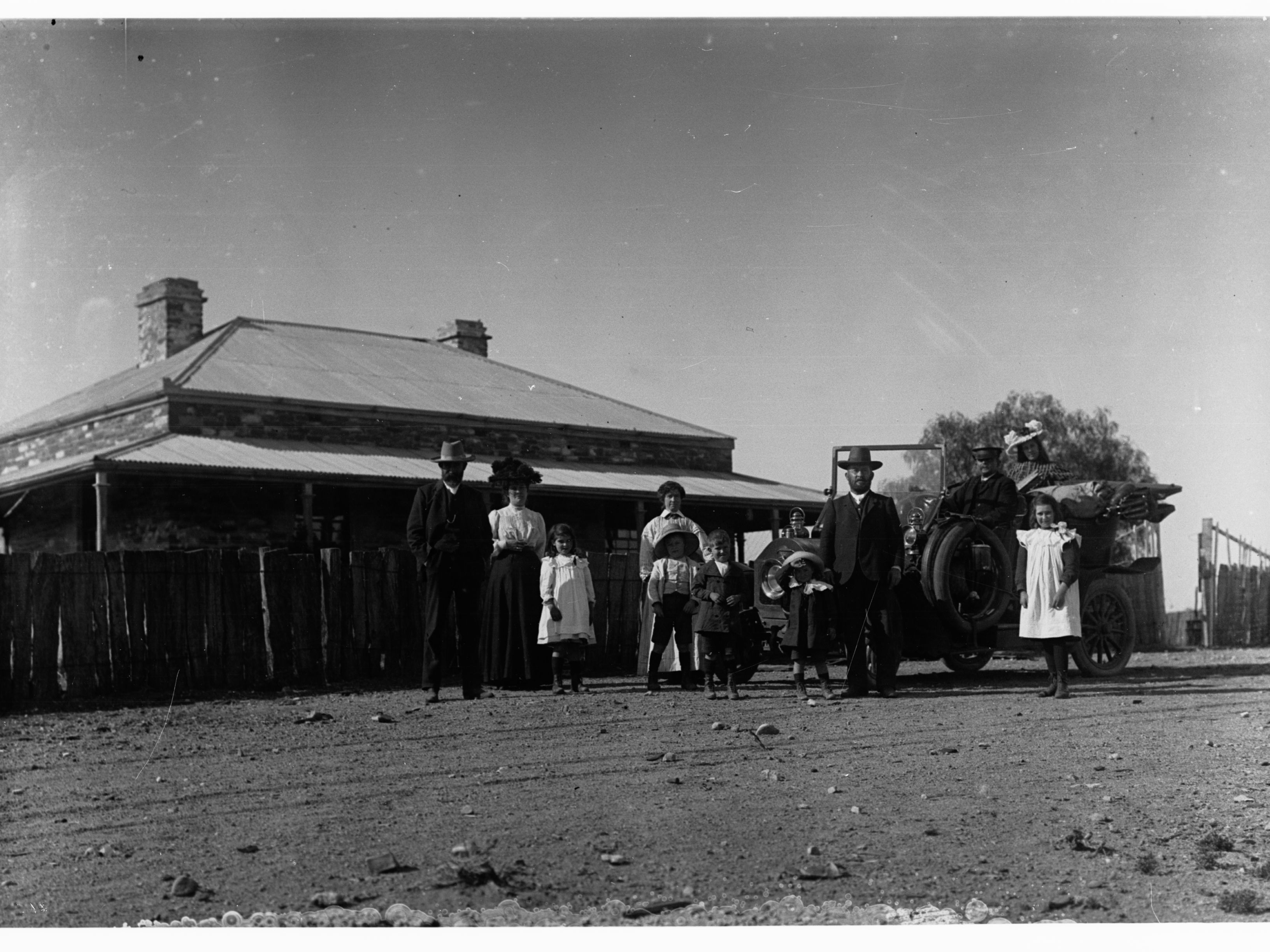
Wirrealpa homestead, c. 1915

Wirrealpa Station is a pastoral lease that operates as a sheep station and cattle station in South Australia.

The property is situated approximately 80 kilometres (50 mi) south east of Leigh Creek and 160 kilometres (99 mi) north east of Quorn, on the eastern side of the Flinders Ranges.

It occupies an area of 1,600 square kilometres (618 sq mi) and has been owned by the same family for five generations.

The lease dates back to the early 1850s, with the station being established in 1856. John Chambers owned the station in the late 1850s and eventually sold it to Philip Levi. Levi had sustained heavy losses through the drought in the 1860s and Wirrealpa was acquired by John Howard Angus in 1871.

The shearers quarters were built in 1860, today they are used as accommodation for tourists visiting the area.

In 1953 the property occupied an area of 904,320 acres (365,965 ha) and was placed on the market to be sold as one lot or split into four blocks. It was stocked with 16,000 sheep at the time that were not included in the deal. F. H. Fargher and sons acquired a 228,480 acres (92,463 ha) portion of Wirrelapa in 1953, including the eight bedroom stone homestead situated on the area. They bought the property from the Mundi Mundi Pastoral Company at a cost of £65,688. The Fargher family still owned the property in 2014 even after suffering through a twenty-year drought from 1990 to 2010.

The land occupying the extent of the Wirrealpa pastoral lease was gazetted by the Government of South Australia as a locality in April 2013 under the name Wirrealpa.

== See also ==
- List of ranches and stations
