= Oulnina =

Pastoral lease in South Australia

Coordinates: 32.51325°S 140.05297°E

Location in South Australia

Aerial views of Oulnina Park Station at Manna Hill, South Australia.

Oulnina Station is a pastoral lease that operates as a sheep station in South Australia.

It is situated approximately 12 kilometres (7 mi) south east of Mannahill and 47 kilometres (29 mi) east of Yunta.

The property was established some time prior to 1861. In 1862, Henry Lorenzo Sprigg owned the station. Sprigg struck financial problems in 1867 and by 1868 both Oulnina and Wadnaminga Station were put up for sale. The two runs occupied a combined area of 900 square miles (2,331 km^{2}) and were stocked with a total of 21,800 sheep. The property had a woolshed, huts, yards and 14 wells. The two stations were acquired by Philip Levi and Co.

In 1870 the two stations were again sold, along with other properties. By this time Oulnina and Wadnaminga were stocked with 17,000 sheep. The area was struck by a plague of grasshoppers in 1872, causing most available feed for stock to be lost. In 1880 a total of 59,095 sheep were shorn at Oulnina.

Gold was found on Oulnina in 1885, and a syndicate was formed shortly after to work a mineral claim on the property. In 1890 only 16,092 sheep were shorn at the property.

In 1897 the property comprised 797 square miles (2,064 km^{2}) and was divided into 17 paddocks. The flock at the time was estimated at 40,000 sheep.

In 1907 the property was acquired by W.J. McBride from the executors of W.H. Duncan's estate. Oulnina occupied an area of 737 square miles (1,909 km^{2}) and was stocked with 38,597 sheep, 62 cattle and 64 horses at this time. It was divided into 38 paddocks and was fully fenced. Stock could be watered from 9 wells or 26 dams with one permanent spring. McBride paid £53,300 for the property.

In 1911, the property was acquired, along with nearby Outlapa Station, by Robert Crawford from R. J. McBride. Crawford intended to subdivide Oulnina into 11 blocks and sell them. Oulnina comprised 776 square miles (2,010 km^{2}) at this time. It was divided into blocks, the largest being 113 square miles (293 km^{2}), and they were put up for sale.

Many of the leases, collectively called 'Oulnina Park', were acquired by J.G. Terry, who in turn sold them off in 1917. George Brooks acquired many of the lots at this point, including the homestead block of approximately 300 square miles (777 km^{2}), and retained them until his death in 1926.

Maurice Francis was the owner of the property in 2013.

Michael Burdon and his family operated the station in 2017, having inherited it from his father. He is believed to have murdered his wife, Tanja Ebert, on 8 August 2017, disposing of her body on or in the vicinity of Oulnina Park Station. Burdon fatally shot himself dead at the property when police arrived on 16 August 2017 as part of their investigation into her disappearance. The farm was offered for long term lease in March 2018.

== See also ==
- List of ranches and stations
