= Moorunde Wildlife Reserve =

Protected area in South Australia

Moorundee Wildlife Reserve
- IUCN category III (natural monument or feature)
- Location within South Australia
- Location: South Australia
- Nearest city: Sedan
- Coordinates: 34°28′00″S 139°27′27″E
- Area: 69.00 km^{2} (26.64 sq mi)
- Established: 1968

Moorunde Wildlife Reserve is a private protected area located in South Australia near the Murray River, between Blanchetown and Swan Reach.

== History ==
In 1967, wombat enthusiasts Jack and Peg Conquest of Adelaide approached members of the Natural History Society of South Australia (NHSSA), keen to establish a sanctuary for hairy nosed wombats. The Natural History Society was a society that aimed to promote the native flora and fauna of South Australia. Together, the Conquests and the NHSSA raised funds to acquire a section of Portee Station for the purpose of establishing a sanctuary for the southern hairy nosed wombat. The appeal was the first environmental appeal in the state, and sufficient funds were raised to purchase two parcels of land totalling 2020 hectares. The Society named the Moorunde Wildlife Reserve after the name Edward Eyre used for a local magistrate outpost. Disagreements over the Conquests' plan to run safari tours and the Society's preference for protecting wombat habitat as a priority saw the Conquests remove their support for the project. The society obtained contiguous sections of Portee, known as the 12-mile plain, in 2008, increasing the size of the property to 6950 hectares.

== Protected area status ==
As of 2014, land that forms the Moorunde Wildlife Reserve is subject to three native vegetation heritage agreements created in 2008 under the Native Vegetation Act 1991 (SA) where its owner, the Natural History Society of South Australia, has agreed to protect the property’s native vegetation in perpetuity. It is classified as an IUCN Category III protected area.

== See also ==
- Protected areas of South Australia
