= John Howard Angas =

Australian politician (1823–1904)

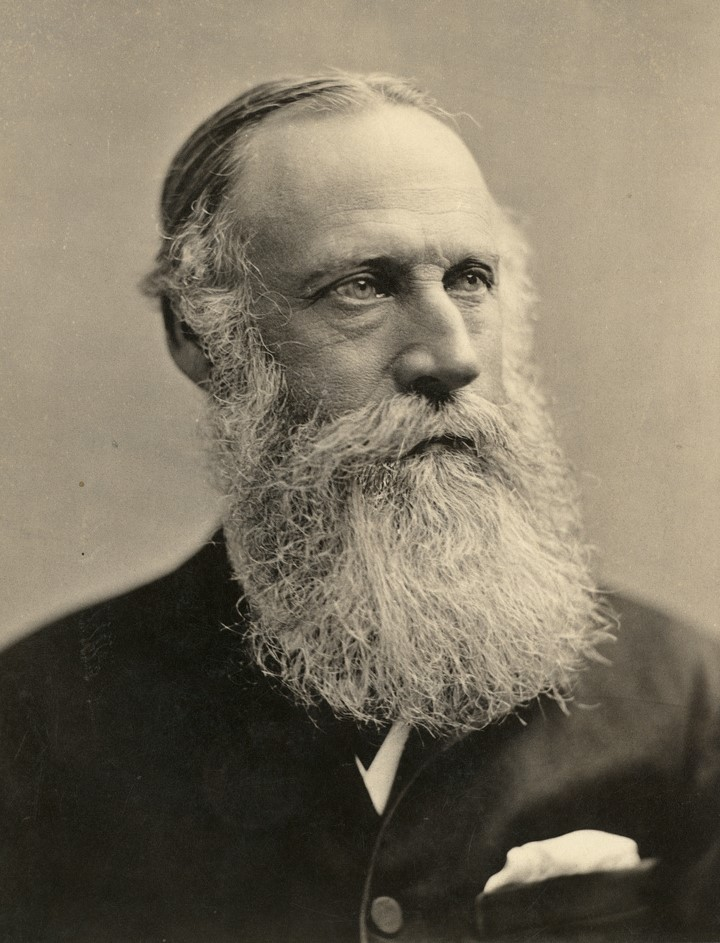
John Howard Angas c. 1890

John Howard Angas (5 October 1823 – 17 May 1904) was an Australian pioneer, politician and philanthropist.

== Early life and education ==
John Howard Angas was the second son of George Fife Angas and his wife Rosetta née French. He was born in Newcastle upon Tyne. There were six siblings including Sarah Lindsay Evans, a temperance activist, and George French Angas, an artist. When around four years old, John was boarded out with a couple in Hutton, Essex where his parents were living. He later attended the University of London for a short time.

== Career ==
He married Susanne Collins (c. 1834 (Note: Susanne's father's name and occupation as recorded when the couple married match those of the father of a Susan Collins, baptised at Cross St Chapel Manchester 18 January 1836, whose place and date of birth was given as Broughton April 26, 1835.) – 14 April 1910) on 10 May 1855 at Bowdon near Manchester. The couple moved to Collingrove, in Australia, later that year.

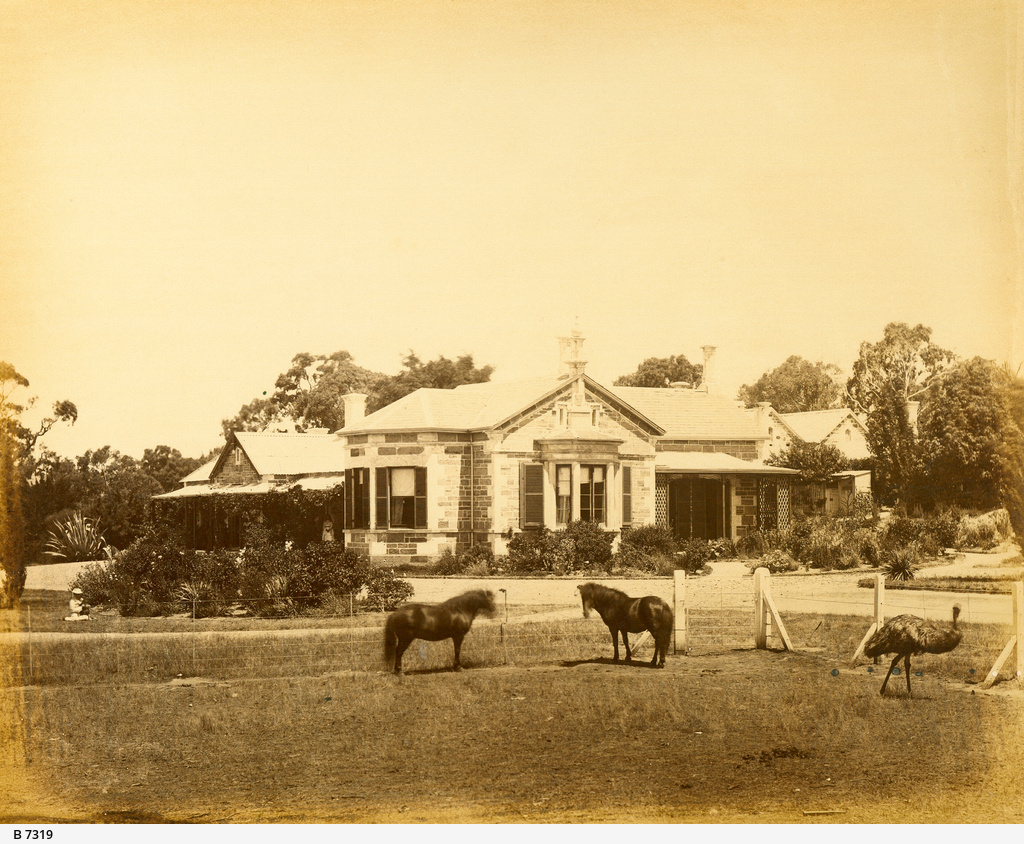
Collingrove

Country life did not agree with Mrs. Angas however, and on their next visit to England, she remained there, and for six years her husband lived alternately there and in South Australia, supervising his pastoral interests. A son Charles Howard Angas was born at his grandmother's house in Upper Clapton, England, on 21 April 1861, and his sister Lilian Gertrude Angas on 13 December 1862. (Note: Lilian married George Bazley-White on 31 January 1891. They divorced; she and three children reverted to surname Angas in 1911, lived Stoke Poges, died perhaps c. 1960, as memorial fund was established September 1963: the death of a Lilian G Angas aged 96 in N W Surrey was recorded Q1 1959.) In May 1863, John and Susanne Angas returned to South Australia on the steamer Pera, with their two infant children. The family was in England again in 1879 when news of the death of John's father George Fife Angas was received, and they immediately returned to South Australia.

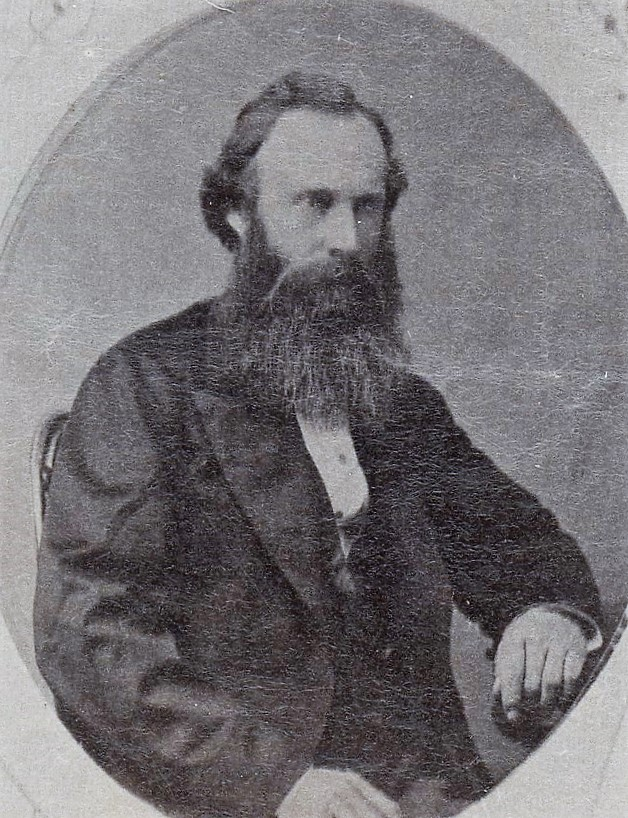
John Howard Angas c. 1872

In the 1860s, Angas purchased from his father the fine residence "Prospect Hall" on Torrens Road at the corner overlooking the Park Lands (not to be confused with J. B. Graham's "Prospect House", aka "Graham's Castle" on Prospect Road, Prospect). which served as his home while parliament was sitting. He was anxious to preserve the amenity of the area, and went to some pains to dissuade tradesmen such as the Champion Brothers from establishing disagreeable industries nearby.

He was a member of the Royal Agricultural and Horticultural Society and its president from 1886 to 1888. From 1871 to 1875 he was a South Australian Legislative Assembly for Barossa. He was elected to the South Australian Legislative Council in 1887.

== Philanthropy ==
Among his charitable giving, a lasting memorial to Angas was his endowment enabling the building of a house (one of 64) at Dr Barnardo's Home, The Village Home, Barkingside, Ilford, Essex. It was known as John Howard Angas Cottage and for about 100 years was home, at any one time, to 12 of the children in Barnardo's care. Angas Cottage was one of many houses at The Village to be demolished to make way for a Tesco Supermarket and its car park on Cranbrook Road, Barkingside.

== Death ==
He died on 17 May 1904 and was survived by his wife, a son and a daughter.

== Angas Chair of Chemistry ==
In 1884, Angas gave £6,000 to the University of Adelaide which, along with a "Covenant and Declaration of Trust", established a "Chair or Professorship of Chemistry".

The Angas Professors have been:

1	Professor E. H. Rennie	1885	1928
2	Professor A. K. Macbeth	1928	1958
3	Professor D. O. Jordan	1958	1982
4	Professor M. I. Bruce	1982	2008
5	Professor John. H. Bowie	2009	2011
6	Professor Stephen Lincoln	2011	2015

== Sources ==
- The Adelaide Register, 18 May 1904
- E. Hodder, George Fife Angas
- Mennell, Philip (1892). "Angas, Hon. John Howard" . The Dictionary of Australasian Biography. London: Hutchinson & Co – via Wikisource.
- Burke's Colonial Gentry, 1891.
