= City of Adelaide (1838) =

History
- Name: City of Adelaide
- Route: London–Adelaide–Hobart–Adelaide–London; London–Adelaide–South America
- Launched: 1838, Jersey

General characteristics
- Tonnage: 280
- Sail plan: Barque

City of Adelaide was a sailing ship of 280 tons, built in Jersey, which carried emigrants from England to Adelaide, South Australia.

== Voyages ==
- Arrived in SA 6 July 1839 from London, Captain Donaldson
- Arrived in SA 28 January 1840 from Hobart, Captain Donaldson
- Arrived in SA 6 September 1841 from London, Captain Foster

== See also ==
- City of Adelaide (1864)
