= James Blackburn (architect) =

English civil engineer, surveyor and architect

- Born: 10 August 1803; West Ham, England
- Died: 3 March 1854 (aged 50); Collingwood, Melbourne, Victoria, Australia
- Occupations: Civil engineer; surveyor; architect
- Employers: Department of Public Works (Tas.); Corporation of the City of Melbourne; Board of Sewers and Water Supply (Vic.)
- Criminal charges: Forgery (1833)
- Criminal penalty: Life; transported to Van Diemen's Land
- Criminal status: Free pardon (1841)
- Spouse: Rachel Hems (m. 1826)
- Buildings: Holy Trinity Church, North Hobart (1847); Bridgewater Bridge (1849)
- Projects: Melbourne's water supply system
- Design: Yan Yean Reservoir (1851); St Mark's Church (1853)

James Blackburn (10 August 1803 – 3 March 1854) was an English civil engineer, surveyor and architect best known for his work in Colonial Australia. Transported to Van Diemen's Land as a sentence for forgery, Blackburn is notable for his work in both the Colony of Tasmania and the Colony of Victoria; and, in Tasmania, was key to the formation of the Department of Public Works in 1839, serving as one of its core members under Alexander Cheyne.

On 3 May 1841 he was pardoned, whereupon he entered private practice with James Thomson, another a former convict. Among the notable constructions of the firm was the swing Bridgewater Bridge completed in 1849. After that project, Blackburn and his family moved to Melbourne, where in addition to resuming his architect career and pursuing other business interests, he became city surveyor. His most notable effort in this role was the conception and design of a water supply system for Melbourne which drew from the Yan Yean Reservoir. Three years later, in 1854, Blackburn died of typhoid, with five of his ten children, eight of which had been born in Australia, surviving him.

== Life ==
Blackburn was born on 10 August 1803 in Upton, West Ham, England. He was the third son born in a family of five children, four boys and one girl. His father and all of his brothers were scalemakers. At the age of 23, he was employed by the Commissioners of Sewers for Holborn and Finsbury and later on became an inspector of sewers. In 1833, suffering economic hardship, he forged a cheque for which he was convicted, sentenced to life imprisonment, and transported to Van Diemen's Land.

Blackburn was listed as a civil engineer and surveyor on the journey to Tasmania and was assigned to the Roads Department under Roderic O'Connor, a wealthy Irishman who was the Inspector of Roads and Bridges at the time.

=== Work in Tasmania ===
In April 1843 Blackburn was assigned as an Engineer to the Roads Department according to an entry in the Blue Book in 1839. In August 1834 he handed in a report to the Government dealing with the water crisis which had been affecting the town of Launceston, for at least ten years. In October of that year, Blackburn completed plans and sections which were proposed solutions to solve the crisis. In March 1835, the government still did not make up a decision. It was until half a year later when most people agreed on Blackburn's proposal and in March 1836, constructions were finally put to work. Cheyne, who became the Inspector of Roads and Bridges after the resignation of O'Connor in December 1835, expressed his confidence in Blackburn.

He is the only person I can depend upon to do many of the duties, and without his assistance I must necessarily have done them myself… He is the only person in the Department beside myself who can survey and level… I place more confidence in him than I could in the greater proportion of those who call themselves free… If Blackburn from being a convict is incapacitated from making enquiries, no time must be lost in supplying his place with a free person qualified to do the duties, if such can be found, which I doubt, in the colony.

In August 1836, Blackburn's detailed work had been examined by sixteen senior government officials and he was permitted a free pardon in January 1840 which became effective in May 1841.

Between 1839 and 1841, Blackburn was involved in the designs of Government buildings and churches. In 1841, he was involved with the completion of Bridgewater Causeway. In August he submitted a proposal with James Thomson but further changes and delays were made. The project was finally begun in March 1847 and the bridge were opened in April 1849.

=== Work in Victoria ===
In April 1849, Blackburn sailed from Tasmania with his wife and ten children to start a new life in Melbourne. In May Blackburn was aware of the polluted water pumped from Yarra River for sale directly causing a death rate of 20 per week. Engaged initially by the Corporation of the City of Melbourne, in 1853 Blackburn submitted plans to the newly-appointed Board of Sewers and Water Supply and proposed that a red gum pipe could be introduced at the corner of Flinders and Elizabeth streets as an allotment. The water would be directed to a tank and filtered to remove the pollutant before being sold to the public; and hence, the establishment a dam across the Plenty River to form the Yan Yean Reservoir.

In July 1853, the construction of St Mark's Church in Fitzroy, began to designs by Blackburn and his son, also called James.

Due to the pollution of the Yarra River, Blackburn submitted a report to the Council in August 1851 suggesting to bring water to Melbourne using gravity from the upper reaches of Plenty River. However, this proposal was declined and another scheme was chosen. Clement Hodgkinson, who had also suggested a scheme, studied Blackburn's proposal and said: "After visiting the ground I have much pleasure in giving my humble testimony as to the care, industry and engineering talent displayed by Mr Blackburn." The Government accepted the recommendation and the work was carried out.

=== Death and legacy ===
At the age of 51, James Blackburn died from typhoid, the same sickness which killed four of his sons and a daughter.

The Melbourne suburb of Blackburn may have been named after him.

== Notable works ==
=== In Tasmania ===
- [YYYY] - The Grange, Campbell Town
- 1837 – Glenorchy Watch House - since demolished
- 1838 – St Mary's Kempton
- 1839 – Longford Gaol
- 1839 – Spring Hill Watch House
- 1839 – St Matthew's Church, Glenorchy
- 1839 – St Mark's Church, Pontville
- 1839 – St Matthew's Church, Rokeby
- 1840 – St Andrew's Church, nave only, Westbury
- 1840 – Scots Presbyterian Schurch, Sorell
- 1841 – Holy Trinity Rectory, Hobart
- 1841 – Porticos on Public Offices, Murray Street, Hobart
- 1841 – Holy Trinity Church, Launceston - since demolished
- 1841 – Tower and vestries only, St George's Church, Battery Point
- 1842 – New Town Congregational Church
- 1842 – Lady Franklin Museum, Lenah Valley
- 1842 – Congregational Chapel, Bagdad
- 1842 – Congregational Chapel, Cambrdige
- 1843 – Queen Mary Club, formerly Bank of Australasia, 143-145 Macquarie Street, Hobart
- 1847 – Holy Trinity Church, North Hobart

==== Notable church projects ====
St Mark's, Pontville St Mark's is an Anglican church in Pontville, Tasmania. It was sited by Governor Lachlan Macquarie, in 1821. It was designed by Blackburn in a distinctive neo-Norman style and built between 1839 and 1841 by Joseph Moir at a cost of approximately £2,600. It is constructed from local Brighton stone. The main façade incorporates a central Norman doorway flanked by raking arcades and low towers. The interior includes elaborately carved furniture by Hobart woodcarver Ernest Osborne. Between the front two towers, effectively recessed by their juxtaposition is the entrance porch which comprises two central Tuscan columns supporting a segmented arch with zigzag decoration and inversely castellated cornice, reminiscent of a sun temple, with miniature raked colonnades either side. It is unique, though architecturally it has affinities with at least two other Tasmanian churches, the Presbyterian Church at Glenorchy and the New Town Congregational Church. The designs of those buildings mark the earliest colonial appearances of the Romanesque style in the history of Australian architecture.

Holy Trinity church, Hobart

Blackburn's Holy Trinity, is a good example of Gothic Revival ecclesiastical construction in sandstone. It has one of the oldest sets of bell in Australia. The foundation stone was laid by John Franklin in 1841 and construction was completed in 1848.

=== In Victoria ===
- 1853 – St Mark's Anglican Church, Fitzroy
