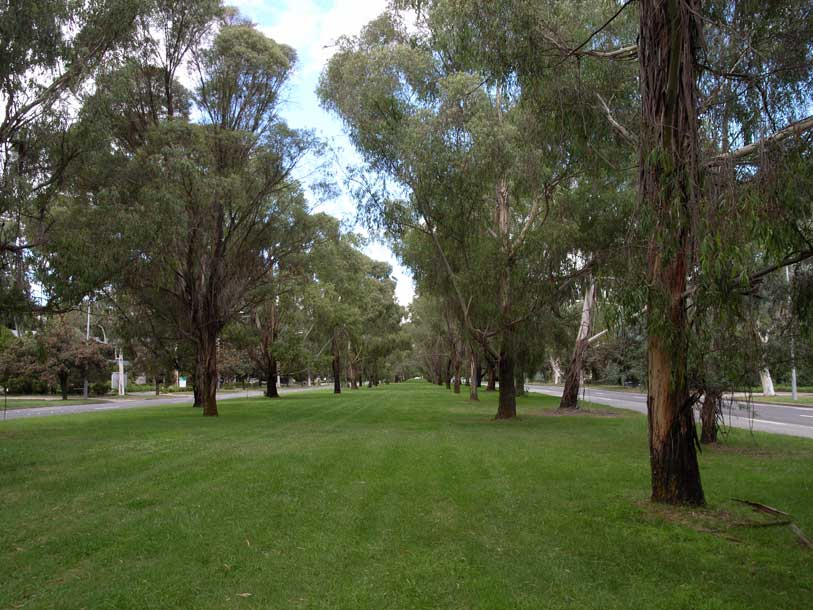
- Eucalyptus elata, lining Northbourne Avenue, Canberra

Scientific classification
- Kingdom: Plantae
- Clade: Embryophytes
- Clade: Tracheophytes
- Clade: Spermatophytes
- Clade: Angiosperms
- Clade: Eudicots
- Clade: Rosids
- Order: Myrtales
- Family: Myrtaceae
- Genus: Eucalyptus
- Species: E. elata

Binomial name
- Eucalyptus elata Dehnh.
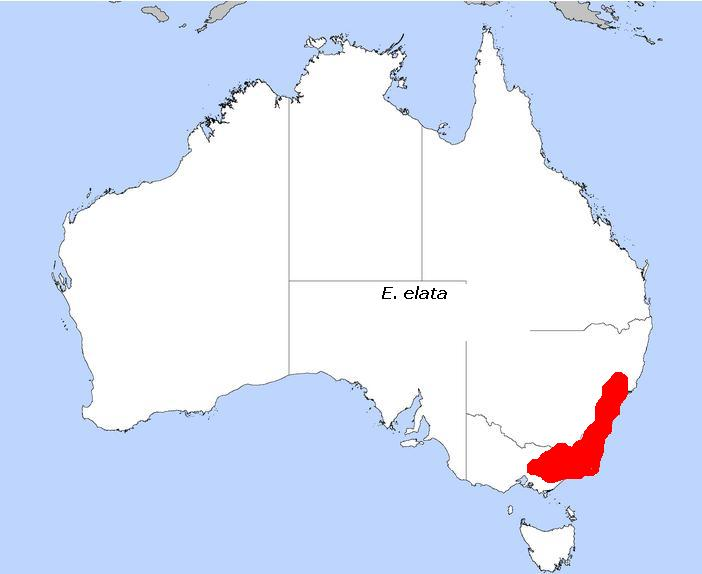
- E. elata, field distribution

Synonyms
- Eucalyptus andreana var. stenophylla (William Blakely) Cameron; Eucalyptus lindleyana var. stenophylla Blakely

= Eucalyptus elata =

River peppermint

Species of eucalyptus

Eucalyptus elata, commonly known as the river peppermint or river white gum, is a species of medium to tall tree that is endemic to eastern Australia. It has rough, compacted bark on the lower trunk, smooth bark above, lance-shaped to curved adult leaves, green to yellow flower buds arranged in groups of eleven to thirty or more, white flowers and hemispherical or shortened spherical fruit.

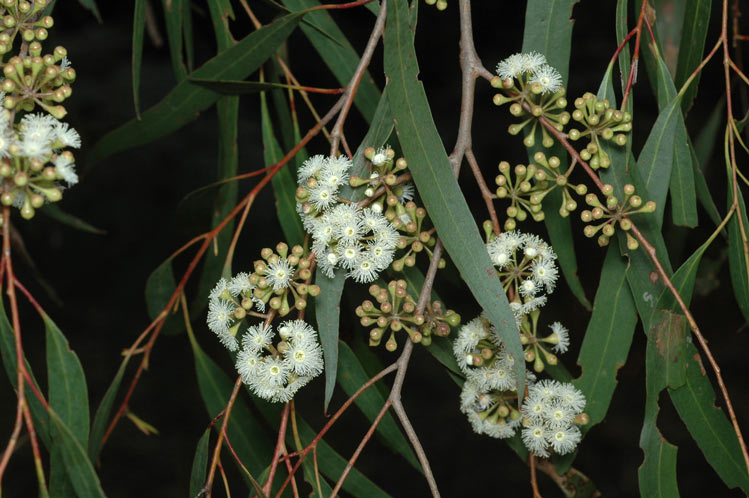
Buds and flowers

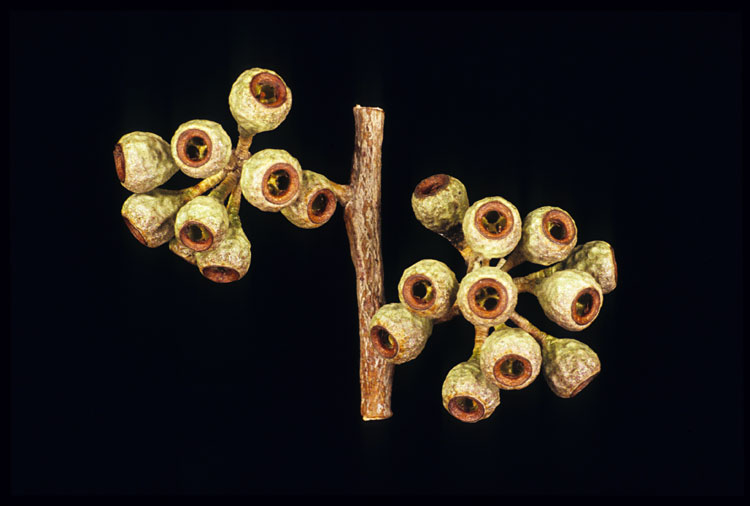
Fruit

== Description ==
Eucalyptus elata is a tree that typically grows to a height of 40 m (130 ft), rarely a mallee to 6 m (20 ft), and forms a lignotuber. It has rough, compact, dark grey bark, with narrow longitudinal fissures on the lower trunk. The bark on the upper trunk and branches is smooth, shedding in long ribbons often remaining in the crown, leaving a grey, cream-coloured or whitish surface. Young plants and coppice regrowth have leaves arranged in opposite pairs, lance-shaped to curved, 33–105 mm (1.3–4.1 in) long and 6–16 mm (0.24–0.63 in) wide. Adult leaves are arranged alternately, the same glossy green on both sides, lance-shaped to curved, 60–220 mm (2.4–8.7 in) long and 6–20 mm (0.24–0.79 in) wide on a petiole 6–20 mm (0.24–0.79 in) long. The flower buds are arranged in groups of between eleven and thirty or more in leaf axils on an unbranched peduncle 4–12 mm (0.16–0.47 in) long, the individual buds on a pedicel 3–5 mm (0.12–0.20 in) long. Mature buds are club-shaped, 2–4 mm (0.079–0.157 in) long and 1.5–3 mm (0.059–0.118 in) wide with a conical to rounded operculum. Flowering occurs from August to December and the flowers are white. The fruit is a woody, hemispherical or shortened spherical capsule 3–5 mm (0.12–0.20 in) long and 3–6 mm (0.12–0.24 in) wide with the valves enclosed below the rim.

== Taxonomy and naming ==
Eucalyptus elata was first described in 1829 by Friedrich Dehnhardt in his book, Catalogus Plantarum Horti Camaldulensis. The specific epithet (elata) is a Latin word meaning "exalted", "high" or "lofty".

== Distribution and habitat ==
River peppermint usually grows along watercourse but sometimes also in undulating country, on rocky ridges or on scree slopes in forest. It grows near the coast and nearby tablelands south from Putty in New South Wales to eastern Victoria.

== Uses ==
=== Use in horticulture ===
E. elata is widely cultivated as a street and ornamental tree for its beautiful upper smooth bark, rich green foliage and profusion of flowers that appear in spherical masses.

=== Essential oils ===
The leaves of E. elata have been distilled commercially for a piperitone based essential oil.
