= William Bedford (chaplain) =

Australian politician

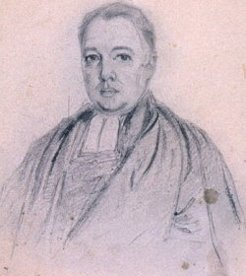
Portrait of William Bedford attributed to Thomas Bock.

William Bedford (1781 – 2 December 1852) was an English clergyman who became a chaplain in Van Diemen's Land (now Tasmania).

== Arrival ==
According to the Australian Dictionary of Biography, Bedford was reputed to have been a stay-maker patronized by Elizabeth Fry, who interested him in prison work.

Bedford was ordained as a priest in 1821, and appointed as a military chaplain for Van Diemen's Land in 1822. He arrived in Hobart Town in 1823, and replaced Robert Knopwood as minister at St David's Church. Bedford remained in this position for the rest of his life, conducting weekly services at St David's and the prisoners' barracks.

== Work ==
Bedford had significant involvement in the life of the early colony. He became superintendent of schools, had a seat on the Legislative Council, and in 1831 was appointed a Justice of the Peace. He was "energetically devoted to the project of protecting the colony's children" through the orphan schools.

Bedford's sincerity and devotion earned the praise of Lieutenant Governor George Arthur. He and Arthur "shared an evangelical vision," and in him Bedford found an "able seconder of his schemes of reformation". Bedford pressed military officers who had mistresses to marry them, and according to James Bickford, "gradually and sulkily the discomfited chiefs gave in."

== Conflict ==
Arthur, however, lost confidence in Bedford when he spread false rumours about Philip Palmer, a rural dean who in 1833 had replaced Bedford as head clergyman in the colony.

Bedford's drinking and financial pilfering also discredited him with much of the community. In 1836 he was ordered to appear before the Executive Council on the charge of having made false returns regarding the schools in his parish. He refused to appear and was supported by Bishop William Broughton. Arthur accused Broughton of "seeking to revive benefit of clergy," while Broughton accused Arthur of "establishing a Star Chamber to conduct secret trials."

== Evaluation ==
According to the Australian Dictionary of Biography, "Bedford's combative nature, self-confidence and uncertain principles had involved him in many controversies in his long colonial service." James Bickford describes him as a man "full of human sympathies", who "combined the love of John with the fire of Peter".
