= L'Hortus Camaldulensis di Napoli =

Botanical garden in Italy

Coordinates: 40°50′23″N 14°12′59″E

L'Hortus Camaldulensis di Napoli, also known as the Camaldoli garden, is a private botanical garden in Naples, Italy. The garden was established in 1816 by Francesco Ricciardi, Count Camaldoli, surrounding his Villa Ricciardi. The garden was supervised by Friedrich Dehnhardt and featured collections of Acacia, Agavaceae, Melaleuca, Eucalyptus camaldulensis (named in its honor), and Quercus ilex.

== See also ==
- List of botanical gardens in Italy
