= St Mark's Anglican Church, Fitzroy =

Anglican church in Fitzroy, Victoria, Australia

- St Mark's Church of England Church
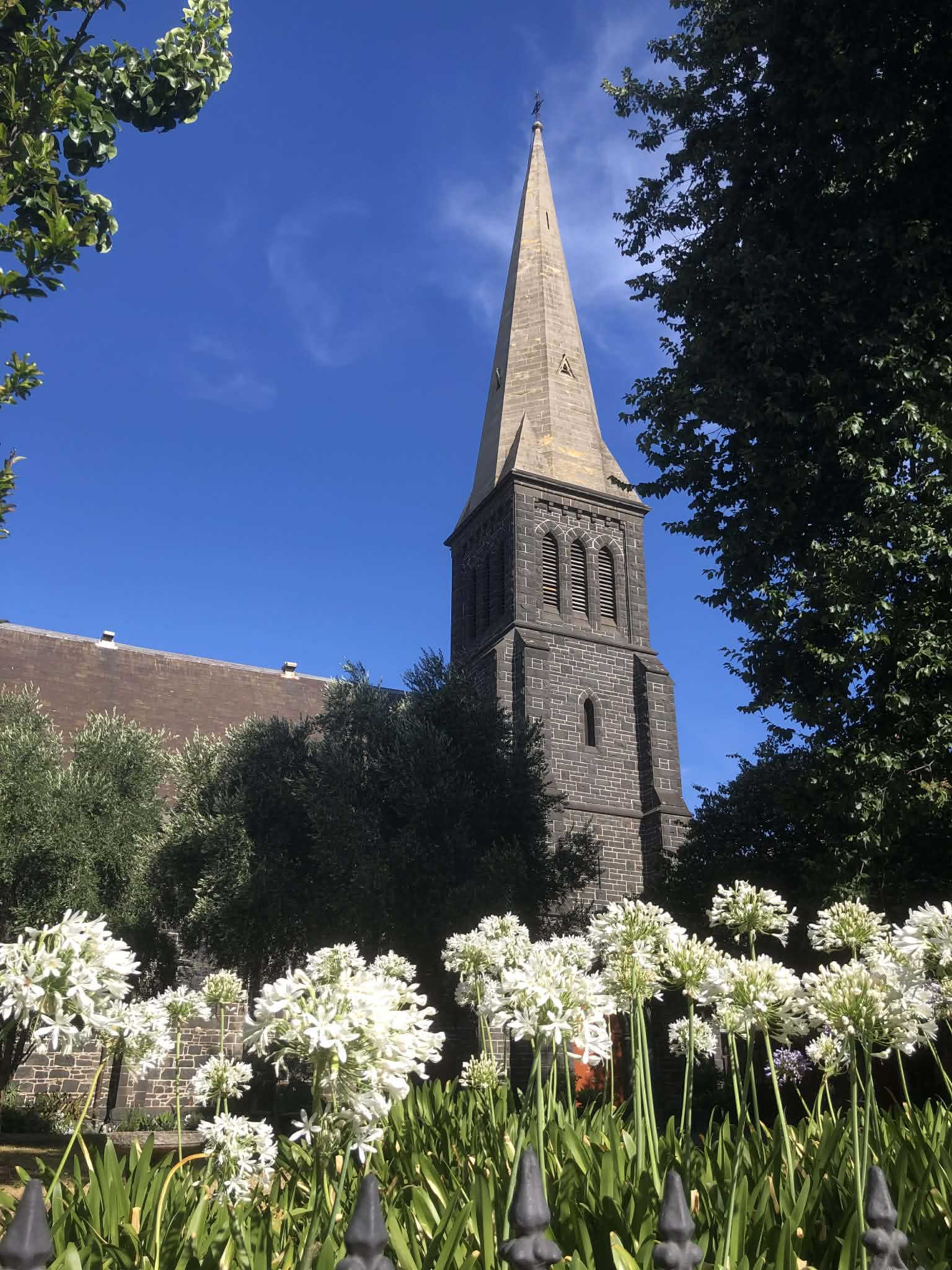
- St Mark's Anglican Church
- St Mark's Anglican Church, Fitzroy
- 37°48′06″S 144°58′55″E
- Location: 250 George Street Fitzroy, Victoria
- Country: Australia
- Denomination: Anglican Church of Australia
- Website: www.stmarksfitzroy.com

History
- Status: Active
- Dedication: Saint Mark

Architecture
- Architect: James Blackburn
- Style: Gothic
- Years built: 1853-1855, 1865, 1874-1875
- Completed: 1855 (later additions)

Administration
- Province: Victoria
- Diocese: Melbourne

Victorian Heritage Register
- Official name: St Mark's Anglican Church
- Type: Heritage Place
- Designated: 6 July, 1983
- Reference no.: H0553

St Mark's Anglican Church is an Anglican parish church located in the Melbourne suburb of Fitzroy, Victoria, Australia. Built between 1853–1855 to the designs of James Blackburn with later additions in subsequent years, the bluestone church has since served the local Anglican community. The church and series of associated buildings in the immediate vicinity, are listed on the Victorian Heritage Register.

== History ==
As early as 1849, a mission church was established to serve the Anglican faithful in the then-fledgling suburb of Fitzroy. This early church also doubled as a school.

The foundation stone for a formal church was laid on 1 July 1853, by Charles Perry, the first Anglican Bishop of Melbourne. The building was designed by architect James Blackburn, who died in 1854 whilst the church was still under construction. The church was completed on Sunday 21 January 1855, and was initially opened as "St Mark's Anglican Church, Collingwood".

The church was consecrated in 1863, and in 1865, further additions were made to the church, with a gallery and stairs completed, to the designs of Leonard Terry. The tower, and its spire, were completed in 1874-1875, to the designs of Charles Webb.

The original school buildings were moved to the opposite side of the church in 1891.

The church has been home to four organs. The first organ, the Church Committee approached James Blackburn, the architect, for the use of a small pipe organ. It was subsequently purchased for £100. This organ was later removed, and replaced with the church's second organ. The second organ was built by Forster & Andrews of Hull and was eventually installed in the church in 1855. It was removed in 1877 and placed in the Richmond Uniting Church. The third organ was built by William Anderson of Melbourne, and placed in the church on 1 November 1877. It was rebuilt in 1963, and then moved to St Francis-in-the-Fields Anglican Church, Mooroolbark in 1999. The present organ was built in 1938 by Harrison & Harrison of Durham, England, and was initially installed in St Luke's Church, Cowley, Oxfordshire, but was installed at St Mark's in 1999.

Externally, the building is made of bluestone, complete with buttresses and lancet windows, and a broach spire. Internally, there is a two-storey arcaded gallery, marble font, and a rood screen dating from 1939.

Additionally, the church contains stained glass windows by William Montgomery. A window, depicting Saint Alban, commemorating William Major Olive, a chorister of the church who was killed fighting in France on Easter Day, 1916, is heritage-listed. William Montgomery designed two other windows for the church.

=== Other buildings ===
The Parish hall was built in 1889, and was designed by architects Hyndman & Bates. In 1923, the Social Settlement Buildings (present-day Community Centre) were constructed, to the designs of architectural firm Gawler & Drummond. During the Great Depression, the Social Settlement was able to feed hundreds of children daily. The vicarage of St Mark's was built in 1910.

== See also ==
- St Paul's Cathedral, Melbourne
- Architecture of Melbourne
