= Holy Trinity Church, North Hobart =

Coordinates: 42.8767°S 147.3214°E

Holy Trinity Church
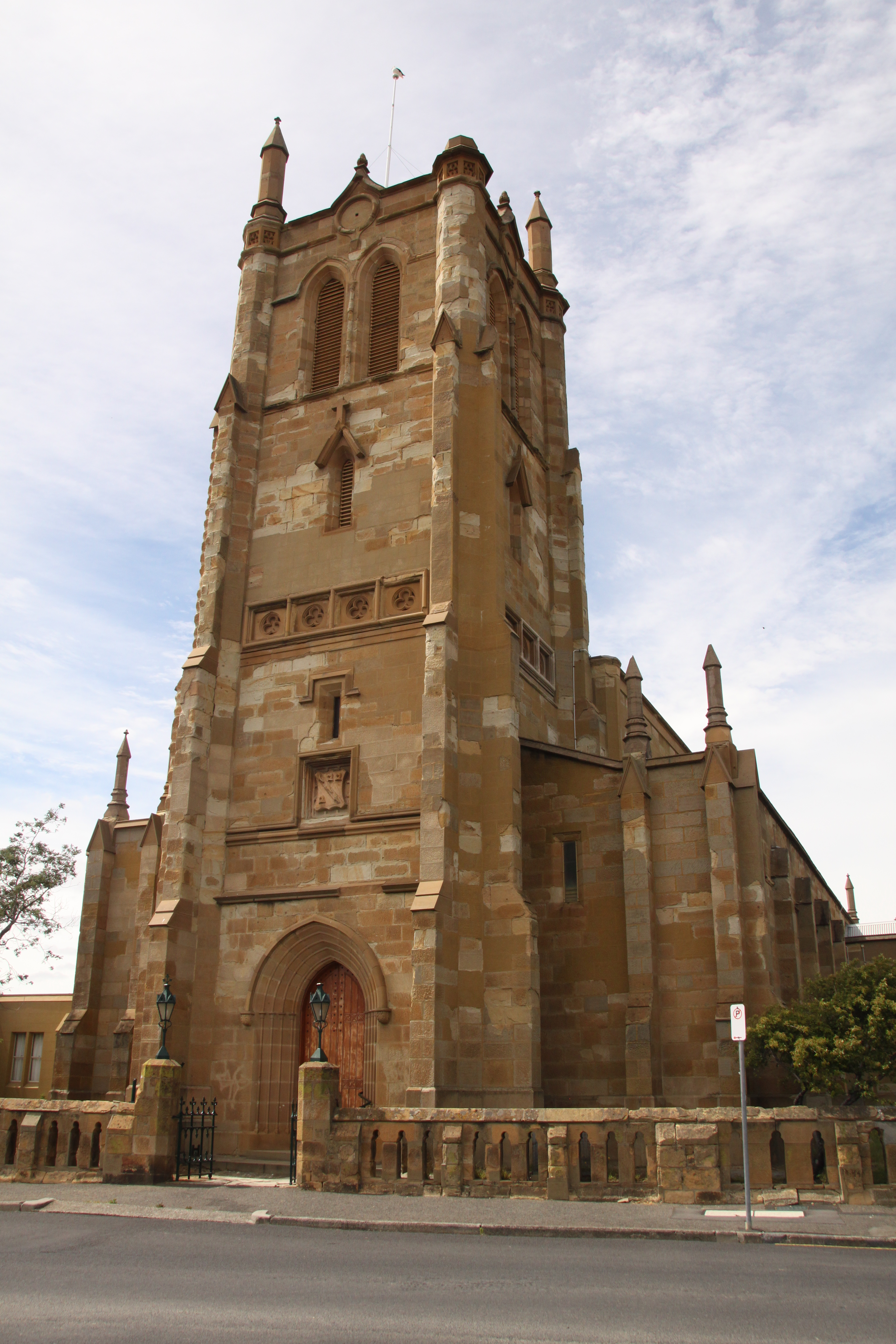
- Holy Trinity Church
- Location: 50 Warwick St, North Hobart, Tasmania
- Country: Australia
- Denomination: Greek Orthodox

History
- Consecrated: 1849

Architecture
- Architect: James Blackburn
- Architectural type: Gothic Revival

Administration
- Diocese: Greek Orthodox Archdiocese of Australia

Holy Trinity Church is a historic former Anglican church, now under the Greek Orthodox Archdiocese of Australia in North Hobart, Tasmania. The church is notable for its significant heritage value and is home to the oldest peal of bells of its type outside of England.

== History ==
=== Early history and Anglican beginnings ===
Holy Trinity Church was designed by renowned architect James Blackburn, who arrived in Tasmania as a convict and later became one of the colony's most celebrated architects. His work on Holy Trinity Church helped cement his legacy as a master of the Gothic Revival style in Tasmania. The foundation stone of the church was laid in 1841, with the building consecrated on 26 August 1849.

The construction of Holy Trinity was made possible through generous donations from Hobart's prominent citizens. The local community contributed significantly to its establishment, with one of the primary donors being William Shoobridge, a notable landowner and philanthropist.

Upon completion, the church was considered a significant architectural achievement in Hobart, praised for its imposing spires and traditional Gothic elements. Blackburn's design reflected the influence of English ecclesiastical architecture, with features such as pointed arches, vaulted ceilings, and decorative stone carvings that became distinctive markers of the Gothic Revival style.

Holy Trinity became the spiritual home for many Hobartians, and its first rector, Rev. Philip Palmer, played a crucial role in fostering the growth of the Anglican community in the area. Rev. Palmer was known for his devotion to the congregation and for guiding the church through its early years, during a time when the Anglican Church was consolidating its influence in the colony.

The church quickly became one of the central places of worship in Hobart and served as the setting for many significant events, including marriages, baptisms, and funerals of prominent local figures. It remained a prominent symbol of Anglican presence in the colony for the rest of the 19th century.

=== 20th century decline ===
Throughout the 20th century, Holy Trinity saw a decline in its congregation as social and cultural changes impacted church attendance. By the early 2000s, the cost of maintaining the historic building became overwhelming for the parish.

In 2007, a property assessment report revealed that more than $5 million was needed to restore the church, and it was deemed unfeasible for the Anglican Diocese of Tasmania to maintain the property. The parish council petitioned the Bishop of Tasmania, Rt. Rev. John Harrower, to deconsecrate the church. The final Anglican service was held on 28 October 2007.

=== Sale and adaptive reuse ===
After a period of uncertainty, the Holy Trinity Church Charitable Trust was formed to preserve the building. The trust aimed to adaptively reuse the church to meet contemporary needs while maintaining its historical integrity. One of the proposed options included creating community spaces, preserving its role as a landmark for public use.

However, despite these efforts, the property was sold to the Greek Orthodox Archdiocese of Australia in 2010. The Greek Orthodox community undertook extensive restoration and adaptive reuse work to ensure the building's future.

The reuse process included preserving key architectural features, such as the original stonework and stained glass, while modernising the interior to suit the needs of the Greek Orthodox congregation. The church was officially consecrated as a Greek Orthodox place of worship in 2023, marking a new chapter in its long history.

== Architecture ==
Holy Trinity Church is a notable example of Gothic Revival architecture in Tasmania, designed by James Blackburn. The church’s key features include pointed arches, buttresses, and towering spires typical of the Gothic style. Its interior boasts high vaulted ceilings, stained glass windows, and intricate stonework, which add to its reputation as a significant Tasmanian landmark.

The church is also home to the oldest peal of bells outside England, which was a major point of pride for the congregation and remains an important historical feature.

== Heritage and preservation ==
Despite its heritage listing, Holy Trinity has faced several challenges regarding its upkeep, primarily due to the high costs associated with restoration. The Holy Trinity Church Charitable Trust was formed to safeguard its future, though the eventual sale to the Greek Orthodox Church was seen as the best option for maintaining the building’s use and significance. Restoration efforts have focused on both maintaining the historical integrity of the church while adapting it for modern use. The state government are currently financing an upgrade of this building, with $175,000 allocated for this in the most recent (2024-25) Tasmanian Budget.
