= Philip Palmer (priest) =

Australian politician

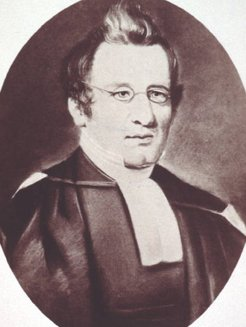
Portrait of Palmer in the Allport Library and Museum of Fine Arts

Philip Palmer (1799 – 21 May 1853) was an Anglican priest who served in Van Diemen's Land (now Tasmania).

Palmer was born in Landrake, Cornwall, and studied at Trinity College, Cambridge. He served as a curate at Langdon Hills, Essex, before being appointed rural dean in Van Diemen's Land.

Palmer arrived in the colony in 1833, and was placed in charge of Holy Trinity in North Hobart and St John's in New Town. He also took services at the penitentiary and the hospital. Archdeacon William Broughton limited his duties as rural dean to those of correspondence in order to prevent friction with the man he replaced as senior clergyman in the colony, William Bedford. Palmer, however, took Bedford's place on the Legislative Council, and Bedford resented the intrusion. He subsequently brought false rumours regarding Palmer's clerical conduct to Lieutenant Governor George Arthur. This made Arthur lose confidence in Bedford, but he appreciated Palmer's work. Palmer served on the Executive Council from 1834 to 1836. However, when Archdeacon William Hutchins arrived in Van Diemen's Land in 1837, Palmer ceased to be rural dean. He was appointed acting archdeacon from Hutchins' death in 1841 until 1843 when Archdeacon Fitzherbert Marriott and Bishop Francis Nixon arrived in the colony.

Palmer oversaw the construction of Holy Trinity Church, North Hobart, which was consecrated in 1849. He was also joint secretary of the British and Foreign Bible Society for eleven years. Palmer was a man of "strong evangelical views" and he opposed Nixon's position on ritualism.
