= Alexander Cheyne =

Anglican priest

Alexander Cheyne was an Anglican priest in the 18th century.

He was educated at the University of Aberdeen. He was the incumbent at Huntly from 1724 until 1727; Presbyter at Fochabers from 1727 until 1732, and the incumbent at Botriphinie during the same period; the incumbent at Stonehaven from 1837 until 1842; the incumbent at Laurencekirk from 1742 to 1744; and Dean of Brechin from 1744 until 1745.
