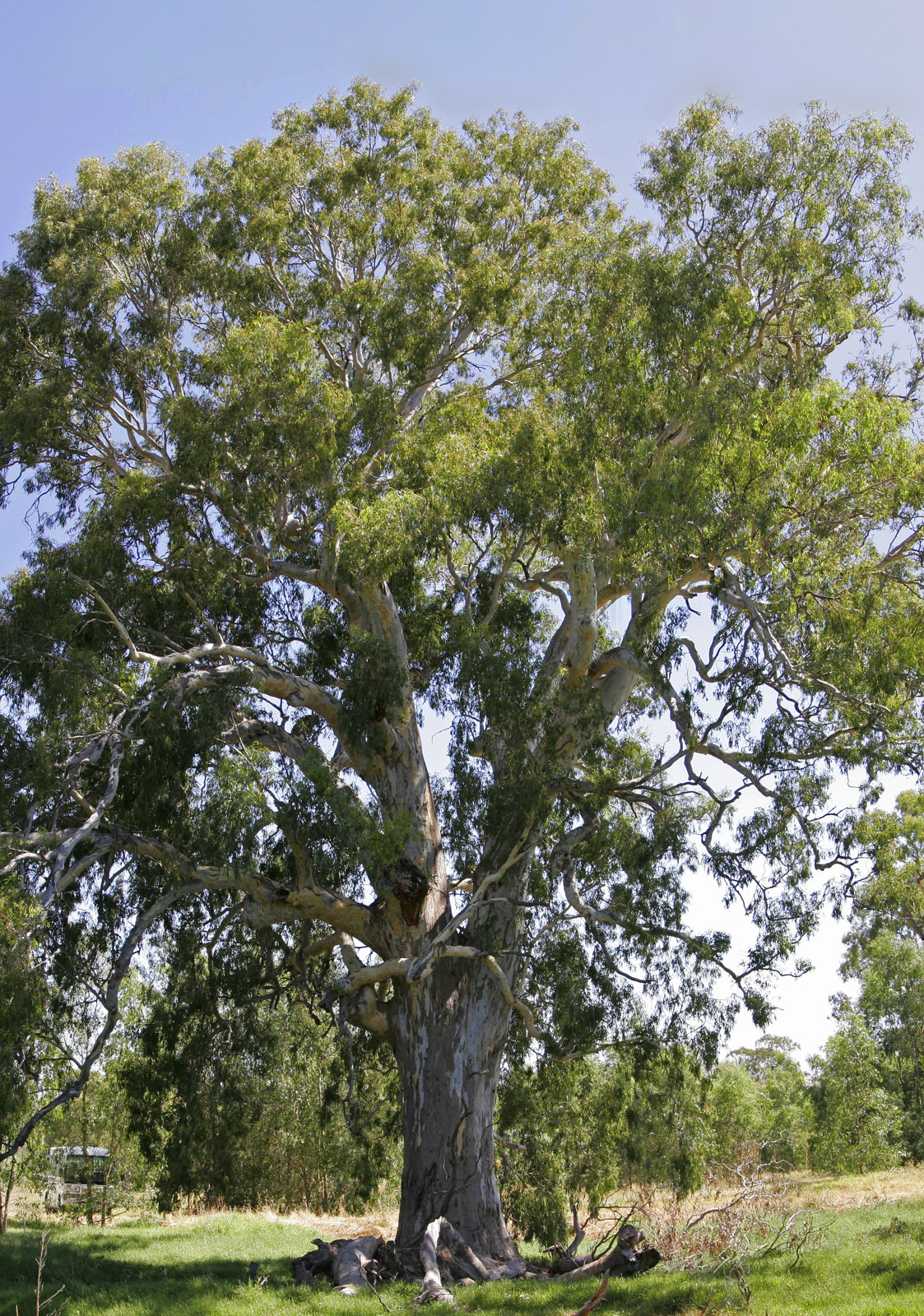
- Eucalyptus camaldulensis in the Wonga Wetlands, NSW

Conservation status
- Near Threatened (IUCN 3.1)

Scientific classification
- Kingdom: Plantae
- Clade: Tracheophytes
- Clade: Angiosperms
- Clade: Eudicots
- Clade: Rosids
- Order: Myrtales
- Family: Myrtaceae
- Genus: Eucalyptus
- Species: E. camaldulensis

Binomial name
- Eucalyptus camaldulensis Dehnh.

= Eucalyptus camaldulensis =

River red gum

Species of eucalyptus

Eucalyptus camaldulensis, commonly known as river red gum, is a flowering plant in the family Myrtaceae, and is endemic to Australia. It is a tree with smooth white or cream-coloured bark, lance-shaped or curved adult leaves, flower buds in groups of seven or nine, white flowers and hemispherical fruit with the valves extending beyond the rim. A familiar and iconic tree, it is seen along many watercourses across inland Australia, providing shade in the extreme temperatures of central Australia and elsewhere.

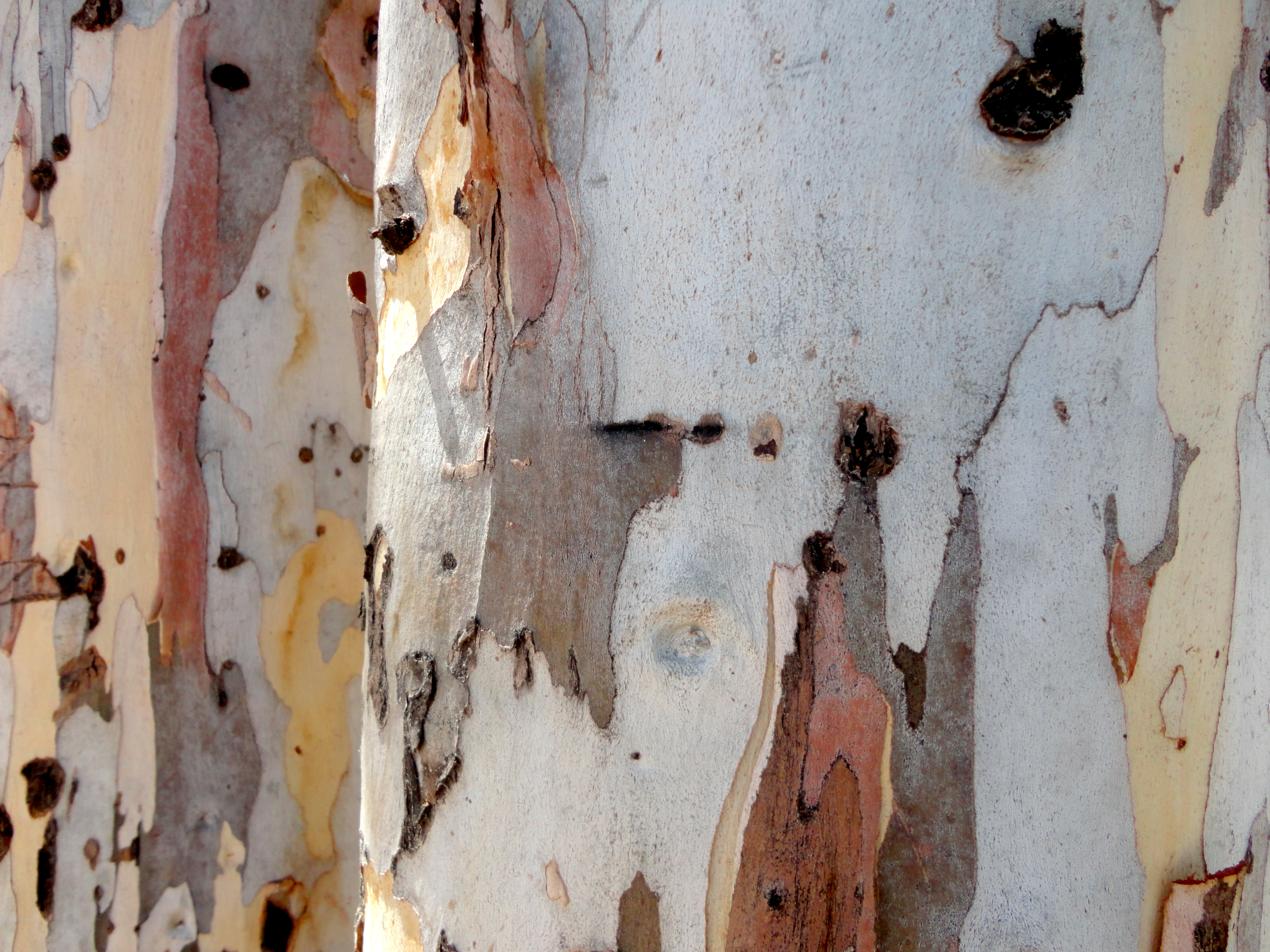
Trunk and bark

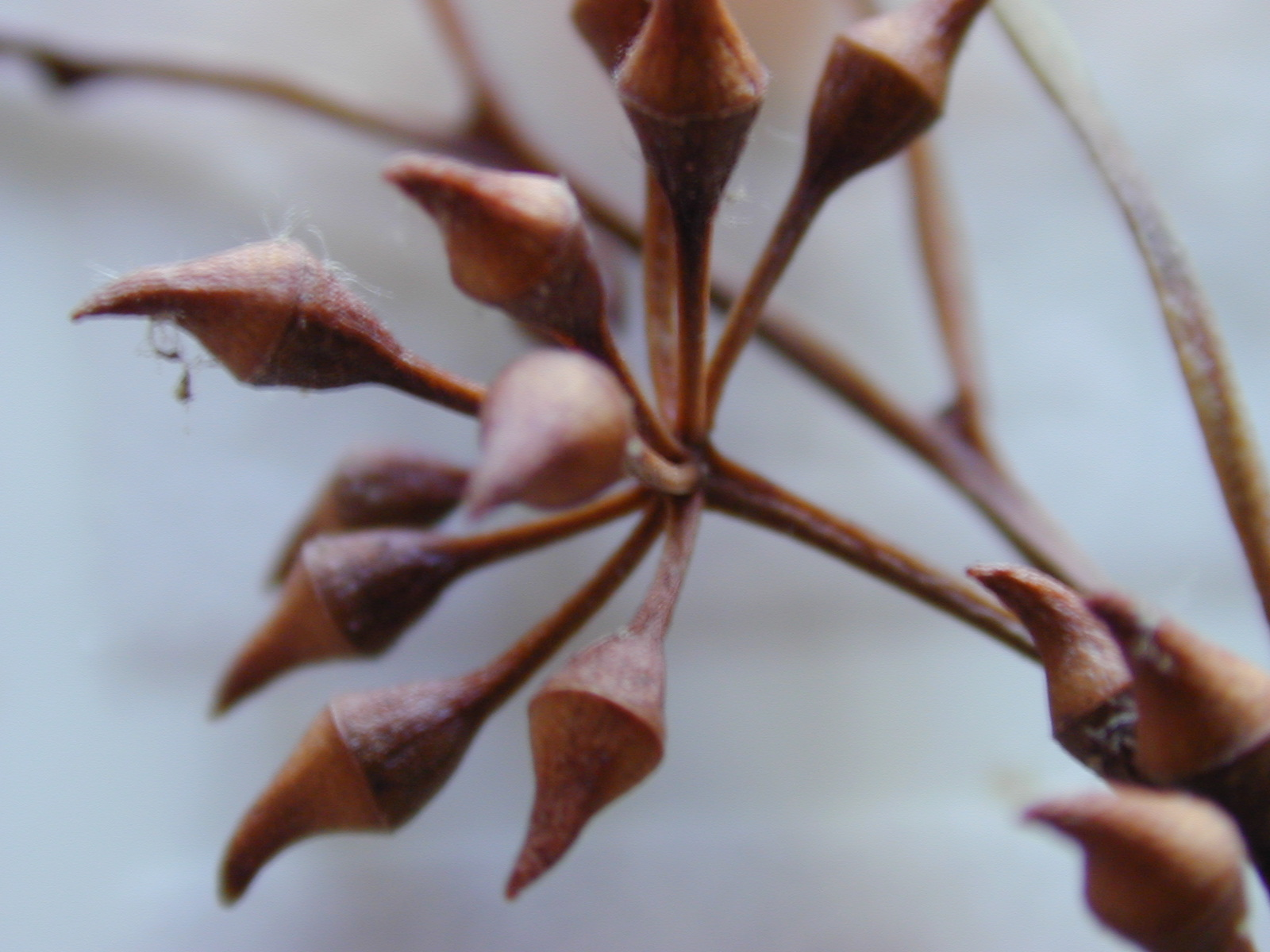
Flower buds

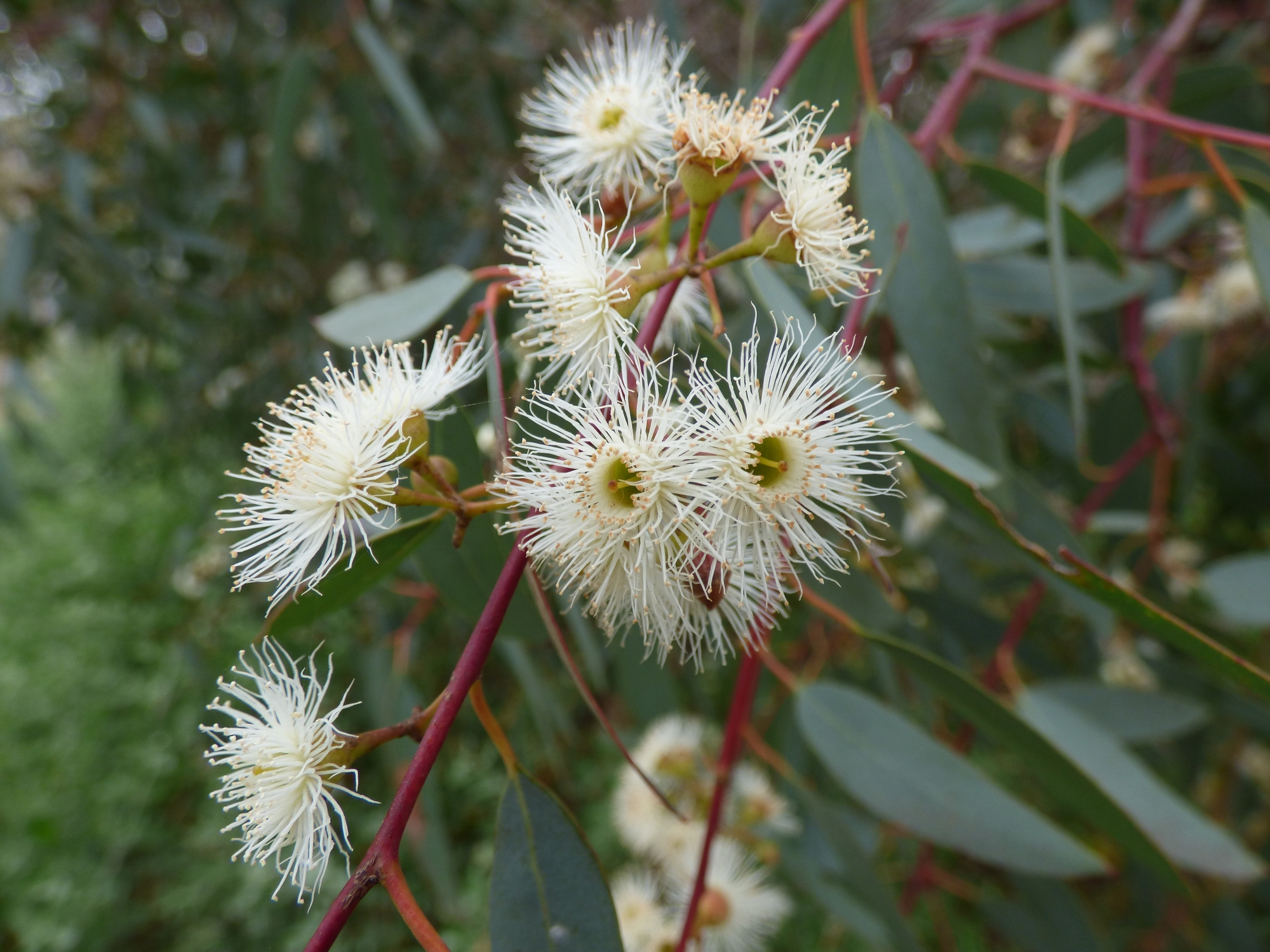
Flowers

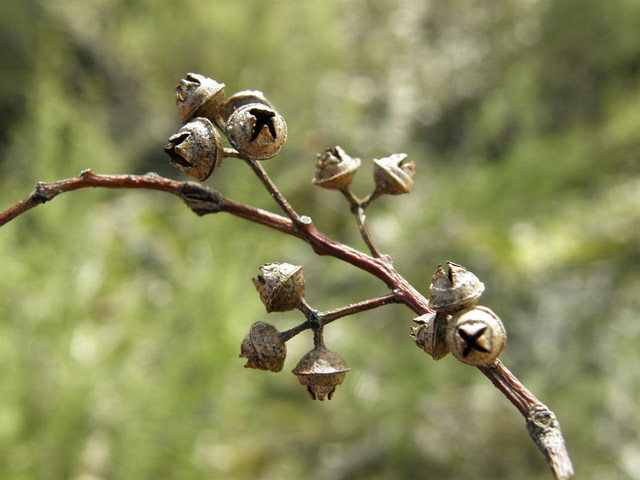
Fruit

== Description ==
Eucalyptus camaldulensis is a tree that typically grows to a height of 20 metres (66 ft) but sometimes to 45 metres (148 ft) and often does not develop a lignotuber. The bark is smooth white or cream-coloured with patches of yellow, pink or brown. There are often loose, rough slabs of bark near the base. The juvenile leaves are lance-shaped, 80–180 mm (3.1–7.1 in) long and 13–25 mm (0.51–0.98 in) wide. Adult leaves are lance-shaped to curved, the same dull green or greyish green colour on both sides, 50–300 mm (2.0–11.8 in) long and 7–32 mm (0.28–1.26 in) wide on a petiole 8–33 mm (0.31–1.30 in) long. The flower buds are arranged in groups of seven, nine or sometimes eleven, in leaf axils on a peduncle 5–28 mm (0.20–1.10 in) long, the individual flowers on pedicels 2–10 mm (0.079–0.394 in) long. Mature buds are oval to more or less spherical, green to creamy yellow, 6–9 mm (0.24–0.35 in) long and 4–6 mm (0.16–0.24 in) wide with a prominently beaked operculum 3–7 mm (0.12–0.28 in) long. Flowering mainly occurs in summer and the flowers are white. The fruit is a woody, hemispherical capsule 2–5 mm (0.079–0.197 in) long and 4–10 mm (0.16–0.39 in) wide on a pedicel 3–12 mm (0.12–0.47 in) long with the valves raised above the rim. The plant's flowers bloom for a long time throughout the year.

The limbs of river red gums, sometimes whole trees, often fall without warning so that camping or picnicking near them is dangerous, especially if a tree has dead limbs or the tree is under stress.

== Taxonomy and naming ==
Eucalyptus camaldulensis was first formally described in 1832 by Friedrich Dehnhardt who published the description in Catalogus Plantarum Horti Camaldulensis.

Seven subspecies of E. camaldulensis have been described and accepted by the Australian Plant Census. The most variable character is the shape and size of the operculum, followed by the arrangement of the stamens in the mature buds and the density of veins visible in the leaves. The subspecies are:

- Eucalyptus camaldulensis subsp. acuta Ian Brooker & M.W.McDonald has mature flower buds with a pointed operculum 6–9 mm (0.24–0.35 in) long and erect stamens and broadly lance-shaped or egg-shaped juvenile leaves;
- Eucalyptus camaldulensis subsp. arida Ian Brooker & M.W.McDonald has bluish green adult leaves with only a few veins and mature flowers buds with a curved to rounded operculum 3–7 mm (0.12–0.28 in) long;
- Eucalyptus camaldulensis Dehnh. subsp. camaldulensis has a strongly beaked operculum, incurved or irregularly bent stamens and narrow lance-shaped juvenile leaves;
- Eucalyptus camaldulensis subsp. minima Ian Brooker & M.W.McDonald has mature flower buds that are small with a conical operculum 2–4 mm (0.079–0.157 in) long and broad juvenile leaves that are usually covered with a powdery bloom;
- Eucalyptus camaldulensis subsp. obtusa (Blakely) Ian Brooker & M.W.McDonald has white, powdery bark in some months and mature flower buds with a curved, conical operculum 4–7 mm (0.16–0.28 in) long;
- Eucalyptus camaldulensis subsp. refulgens Ian Brooker & M.W.McDonald has very glossy green adult leaves with a dense network of veins;
- Eucalyptus camaldulensis subsp. simulata Ian Brooker & Kleinig. has a horn-shaped operculum 9–16 mm (0.35–0.63 in) long.

The specific epithet (camaldulensis) is a reference to a private estate garden (L'Hortus Camaldulensis di Napoli) near the Camaldoli monastery in Naples, where Frederick Dehnhardt was the chief gardener. The type specimen was grown in the gardens from seed presumably collected in 1817 near Condobolin by Allan Cunningham, and was grown there for about one hundred years before being removed in the 1920s. Herbarium specimen of the holotype is deposited in the herbarium of Natural History Museum of Vienna.

Although Dehnhardt was the first to formally describe E. camaldulensis, his book was largely unknown to the botanical community. In 1847 Diederich von Schlechtendal gave the species the name Eucalyptus rostrata but the name was illegitimate (a nomen illegitimum) because it had already been applied by Cavanilles to a different species (now known as Eucalyptus robusta). In the 1850s, Ferdinand von Mueller labelled some specimens of river red gum as Eucalyptus longirostris and in 1856 Friedrich Miquel published a description of von Mueller's specimens, formalising the name E. longirostris. Finally in 1934, William Blakely recognised Dehnhardt's priority and the name E. camaldulensis for river red gum was accepted.

Northern Territory Aboriginal names for this species are:

- aper (Alyawarr, Anmatyerr), aper or per (Eastern Arrernte), apere (Kaytetye), aylpele (Pintupi Luritja), itara, ngapiri, pipalya, yitara (Pitjantjatjara) apara, itara, piipalya, (Waramangu), kunjumarra (Warlpiri), kunjumarra and ngapiri (Western Arrernte).

Dimilan is the name of this tree in the Miriwoong language of the Kimberley.

== Distribution and habitat ==
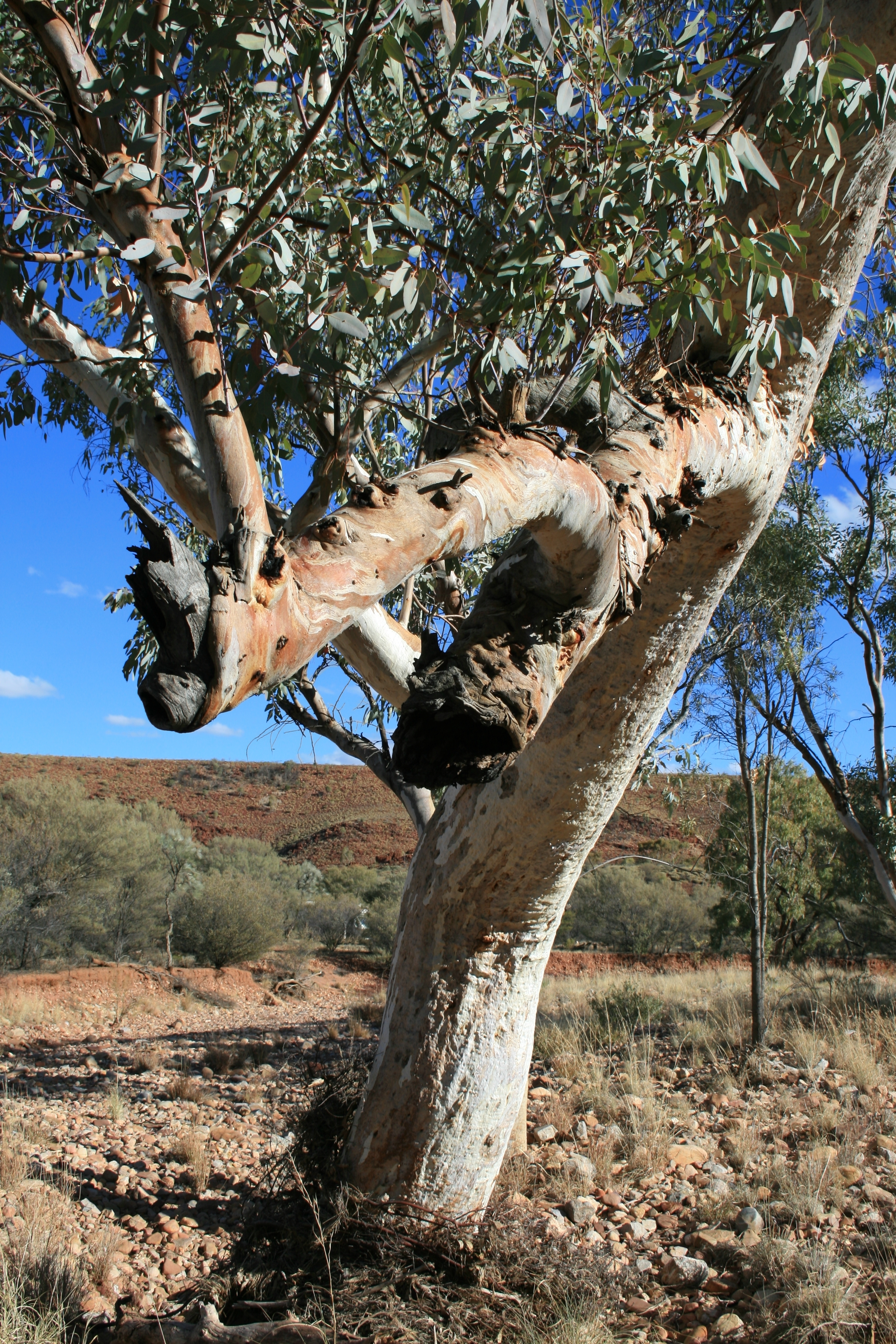
The dry river beds of central Australia have sufficient underground water flow to sustain the trees.

Eucalyptus camaldulensis has the widest natural distribution of any eucalyptus species. It is commonly found along waterways and there are only a few locations where the species is found away from a watercourse.

- Subspecies acuta is common along rivers from south of Cape York Peninsula in Queensland to the north west slopes and plains of New South Wales but is absent from coastal areas and the arid inland.
- Subspecies arida has the widest distribution of the subspecies and is found in all mainland states except Victoria. It grows in arid regions but only where there is sufficient subsoil moisture.
- Subspecies camaldulensis is the dominant eucalypt along the Murray-Darling river system and its tributaries. It also occurs on the Eyre and Yorke Peninsulas and Kangaroo Island in South Australia and in some locations along the Hunter River in New South Wales. It is the only subspecies in coastal Victoria.
- Subspecies minima is endemic to South Australia, where it grows in the northern Flinders Ranges and the northern Eyre Peninsula.
- Subspecies obtusa is endemic to tropical northern Australia, including parts of the Kimberley, the Top End and the Gulf of Carpentaria hinterland as far east as the Gilbert River, Queensland in Queensland.
- Subspecies refulgens is endemic to the Pilbara-Gascoyne-Carnarvon region, along rivers flowing westwards, including along some of the tributaries of the upper Murchison River.
- Subspecies simulata is mainly restricted to some rivers on Cape York Peninsula, but with some populations further south.

In Victoria the species is known to hybridise with Eucalyptus ovata as Eucalyptus ×studleyensis.

Eucalyptus camaldulensis grows under a wide range of climatic conditions from tropical to temperate, but the main areas are characterised by 5 to 20 frosts in winter and high summer temperatures. Temperature conditions may vary from a minimum of -6°C to a maximum of 54°C with a diurnal range up to 21°C.

== Ecology ==
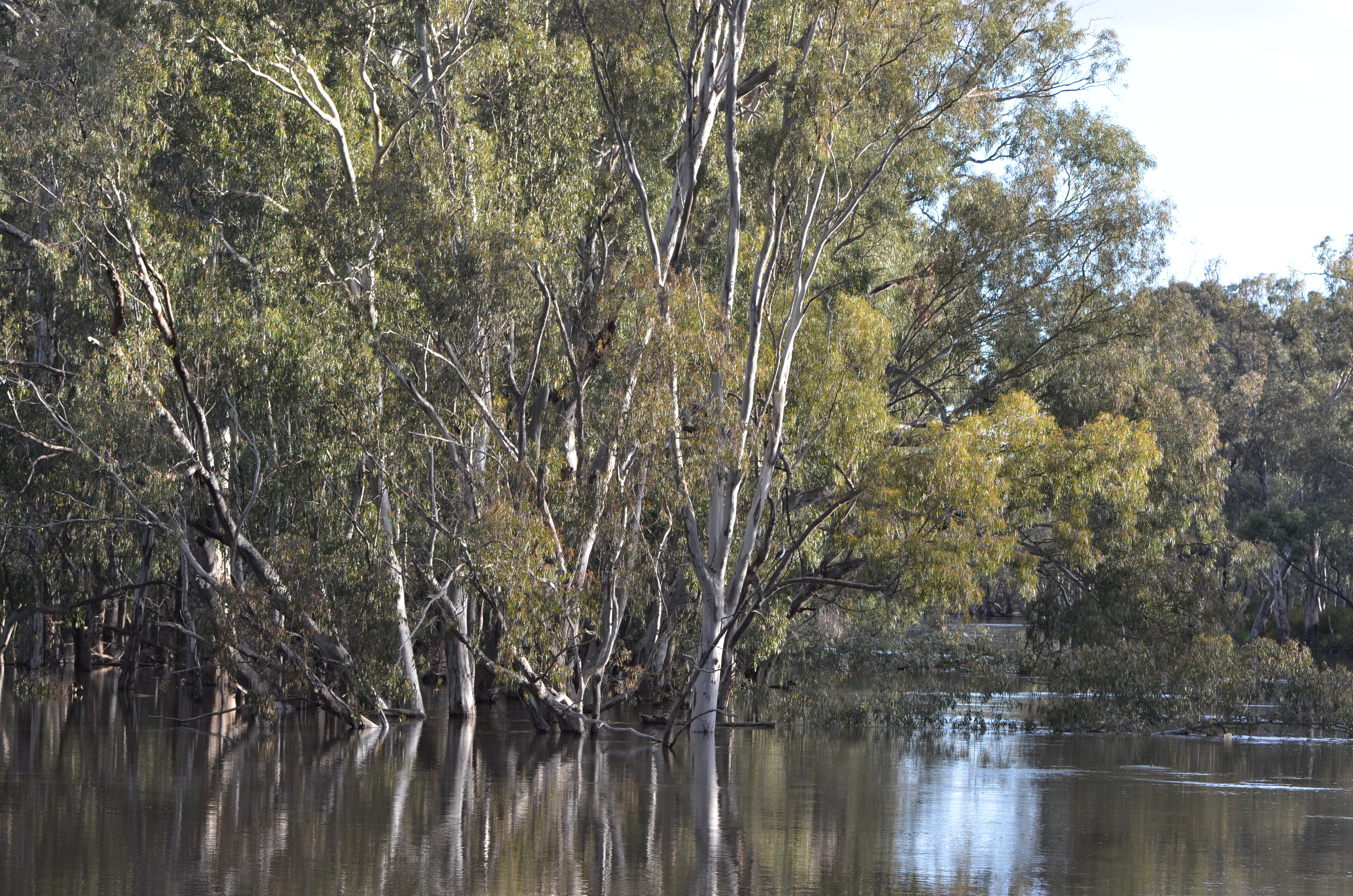
Eucalyptus camaldulensis, Edward River, NSW

The species can be found along the banks of watercourses, as well as the floodplains of those watercourses. Due to the proximity to these watercourses, river red gum is subject to regular flooding in its natural habitat. River red gum prefers soils with clay content. The trees not only rely on rainfall but also on regular flooding, since flooding recharges the sub-soil with water.

The association of the river red gum with water makes the tree a natural habitat choice, indeed sometimes the only choice in drier areas, for other species. The trees provide a breeding habitat for fish during the flooding season, which also benefits aquatic bird life that depend on fish as a food source during their own breeding season. Wilson, who examined the management of river red gums in NSW, suggests shelter is provided for fish in rivers and streams by fallen branches from the river red gum. The "snags" formed when river red gums fall into rivers such as the Glenelg, are an important part of river ecosystems, and vital habitat and breeding sites for native fish like river blackfish. Unfortunately most snags have been removed from these rivers, beginning in the 1850s, due to river-improvement strategies designed to prevent hazards to navigation, reduce damage to in-stream structures, rejuvenate or scour channels, and increase hydraulic capacity to reduce flooding. However, the Murray–Darling Basin Commission has recognised the importance of snags as aquatic habitat, and a moratorium on their removal from the Murray River has been recommended.

Hollows start to form at around 120–180 years of age, creating habitat for many wildlife species, including a range of breeding and roosting animals such as bats, carpet pythons, and birds. The dense foliage of the tree also provides shade and shelter from the sun in drier areas.

The superb parrot, a threatened species, is amongst the bird species that nest in the river red gum.

River red gums contribute to the provision of nutrients and energy for other species through leaf and insect fall. This is especially important to the ecology in areas of low nutrients. The tree's preferred habitat of floodplains and watercourses also gives it the role of flood mitigator, which slows silt runoff.

=== Weed ===
The global weed compendium lists E. camaldulensis as a weed in Portugal, Canary Islands, South Africa, Spain, Bangladesh, the United States, Ecuador, the Galapagos and other countries. The species, while native to parts of Western Australia, has become naturalised via garden escapees and introduction as a restoration plant; they are the subject of weed management programs. Its ability to tolerate drought and soil salinity, together with its prolific seed production, and capacity to reproduce when very young, mean that it is highly adaptable, and it has been declared invasive in South Africa, California, Jamaica, and Hawaii

=== Reproduction and dispersion ===
The flower begins as an "invaginated receptacle". The operculum, or cap, protects the interior of the flower bud, as the male and female parts develop.

The male parts of the flower consist of the stamen, a slender filament, and the anther, two pollen sacs located at the top of the stamen. The anther sacs open into longitudinal slits to release their pollen. These filaments will extend to encircle the receptacle during flowering.

The female parts of the flower, the ovaries, are contained in ovary chambers. These chambers are separated from the receptacle containing the male parts by a disc. From the top of the ovaries a structure called the style extends into the receptacle, to form the stigma.

During flowering, pollen from the anthers can fall onto the stigma. This can occasionally lead to self-pollination, although the stigma does not become receptive until a few days after the operculum has been detached by the expanding stamens, and the flower's pollen has already been released. Fertilisation will therefore occur with other flowers on the same tree or other flowers on a different tree. Insects, birds, and small mammals help in the pollination of other flowers.

After flowering, the stamens will detach. The fruit is the part of the flower that remains after fertilisation, which enlarges, dries, and becomes woody. Triangular valves in the fruit will open, dispersing yellow, cuboid seeds. When seeds are shed from a tree, most fall onto the ground below the crown, with some seed carried by the wind and water. Dissemination occurs mostly in spring and summer, while natural flooding occurs during winter and spring. As the tree is inextricably linked with waterways, seed dispersion would logically be facilitated by floodwater. There is some contention in this theory, however, where the CSIRO describes an experiment that demonstrated seeds were found to sink after only 36 hours. It would also seem that as the seeding and flooding do not entirely coincide, it could be inferred that the conditions for germination, such as damp soil and plenty of sunlight, are more important in the continuation of the species than seed dispersal by means of floodwater. Seeding during the flooding season would prevent desiccation of the seed, which is the main cause of a seed's failure to reproduce. Despite this apparent evolutionary advantage of the species living near watercourses to avoid seed desiccation, many seeds will be produced within an E. camaldulensis forest before one will grow to its own reproducing stage. A gap in the forest must be available for the germinated seed to receive adequate sunlight.

== Uses ==
Culturally, the species is an iconic part of Australia. Its leaves have appeared on Australian stamps and is widely recognised due to its widespread range. The use of the waterways for seasonal recreation also occurs within the habitat of the river red gum, again due their fundamental link to watercourses and floodplains.

An image of The Old Gum Tree was engraved for a stamp in 1936 to commemorate the centenary of foundation of South Australia.

=== Population management ===
The predilection of the river red gum for waterways has been a successful evolutionary niche. This has resulted in a large population and range for the species, and so it is not considered endangered. Changes in its habitat, however, could be detrimental not just for the tree, but also for species that depend on the tree for their own survival. These changes include grazing, and water regulation for irrigation purposes. For example, grazing reduces the ability of the species to regenerate, as stock eat or trample the seedlings. However, grazing may aid regeneration by removing thick ground cover.

In regards to water regulation, there are two problems. One is the timing of the water flow, and the other is the minimisation of natural flooding.

Regulation causes flooding to be decreased during the winter and spring months, and water more consistently flows during the summer and autumn months. Since the river red gum disperses its seed during spring, regulating the water may affect the species' ability to disperse using water as a dispersing agent, especially in floodplain red gum forests. Natural water run-off can also be affected, leaving some trees permanently flooded due to the build-up of water behind dams, or the permanent water flow. Neither can seeds germinate in constantly flooded areas.

Infrequent flooding due to water regulation provides inadequate water to recharge the floodplain subsoils that river red gums depend on. This will result in stunted tree growth, death of existing trees, and poor conditions for seed germination. Lack of flooding in floodplain areas will change the suitability of river red gum habitat as a breeding ground and food source for other species. Indeed, extinctions of some species have already occurred in river red gum habitats in the Murray-Darling catchment.

It has been recognised since around the early 1980s that managing water more effectively would ensure the maintenance of river red gum habitat. Water management would include the removal of subsidies for irrigation, issuing water licenses, and the flooding of forests in suitable seasons.

== In popular culture ==
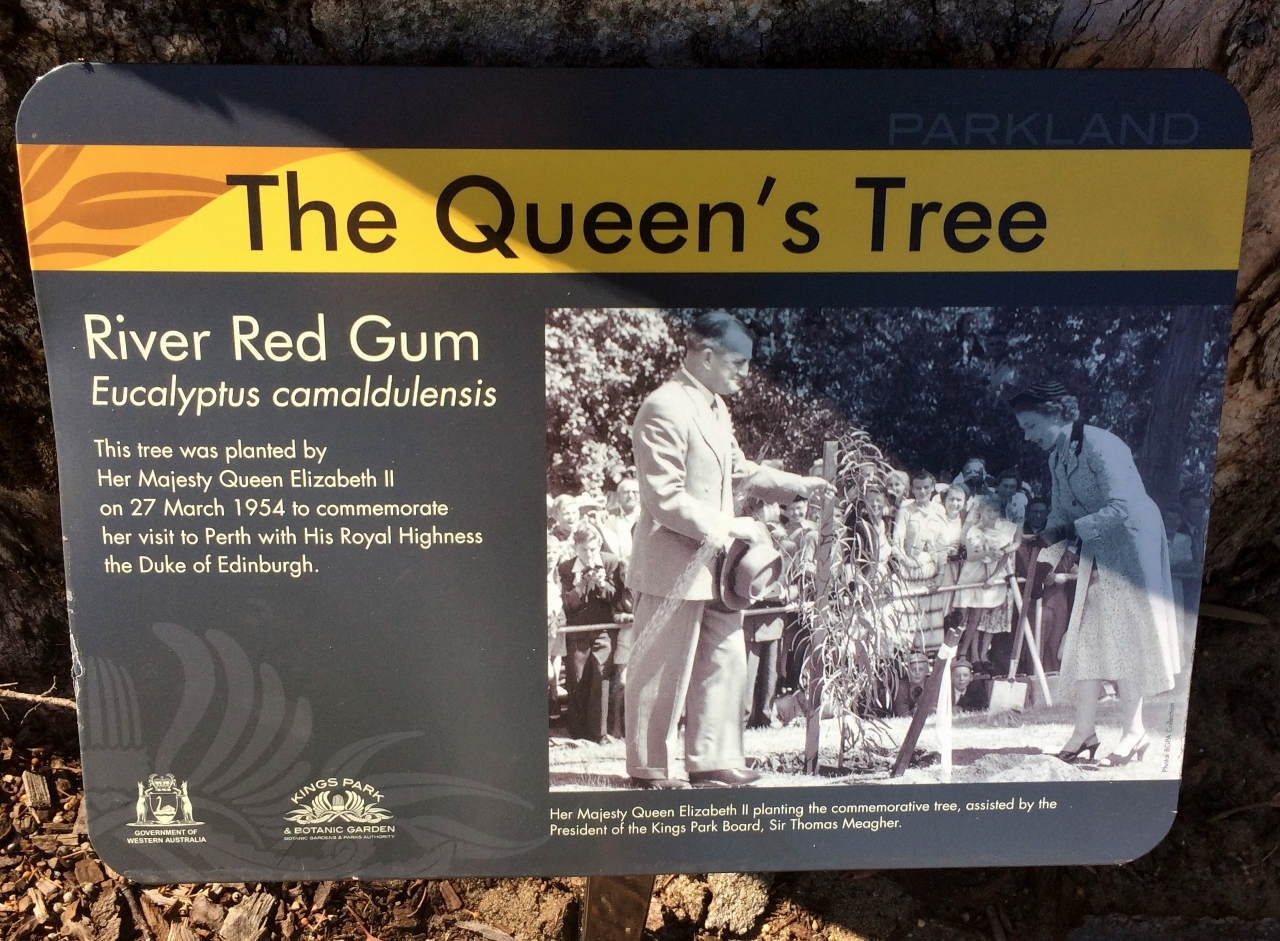
Placard for "The Queen's Tree", Kings Park, Perth, WA

Examples of river red gums include:

- The Big Tree near Moulamein – one of the largest river red gums in the Riverina, with a circumference of 11.6 metres (38 ft);
- Cazneaux Tree – Photographed by Harold Cazneaux in the Spirit of Endurance;
- Separation Tree – Where celebrations were held when Victoria became a separate colony to New South Wales;
- The Old Gum Tree – Where the colony of South Australia was proclaimed;
- The Queen's Tree – Planted in Kings Park, Perth Western Australia in 1954 by Queen Elizabeth II on her first visit to Australia.

== Galleries ==
Features of the river red gum (Eucalyptus camaldulensis)
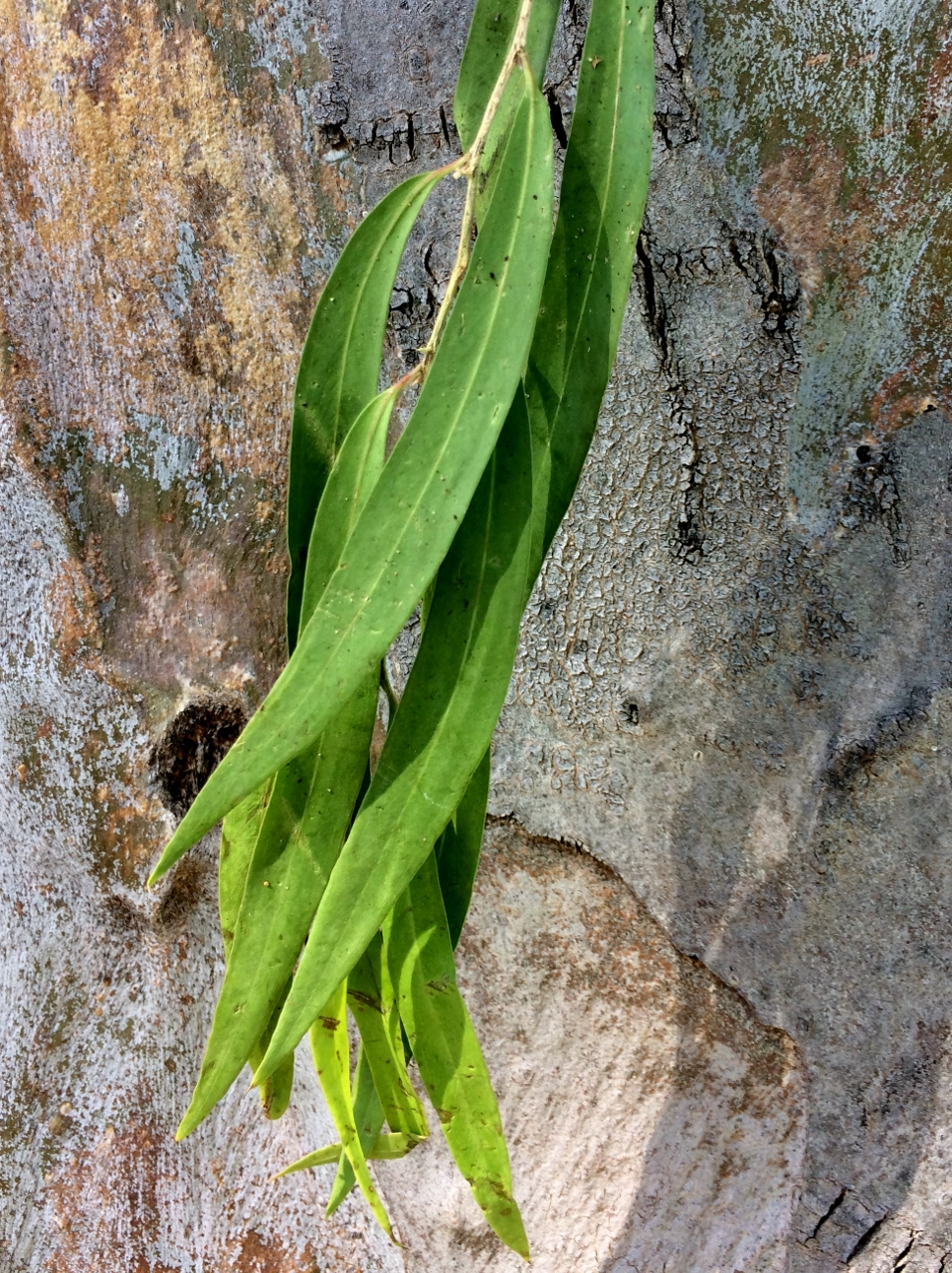
Adult leaves

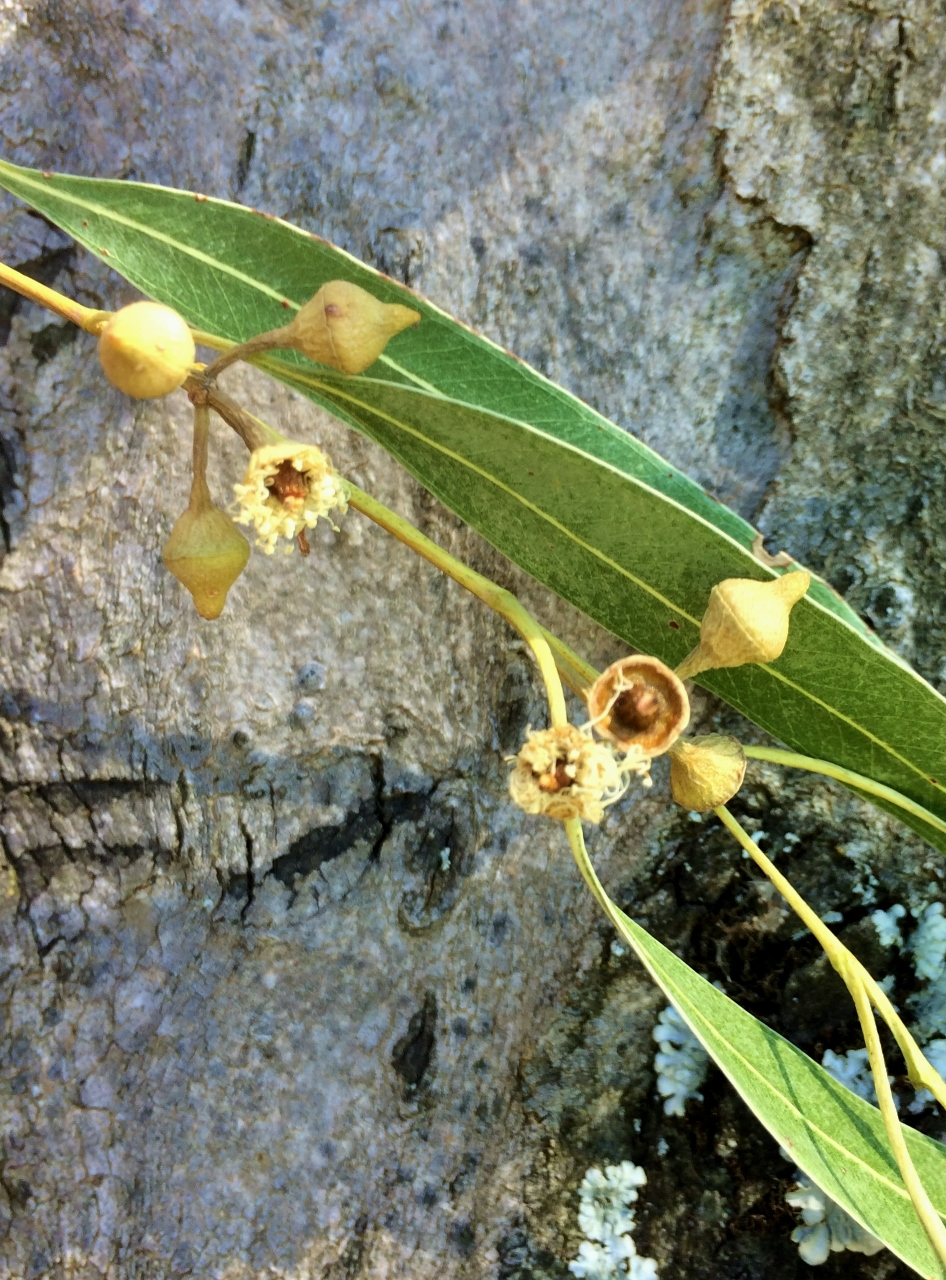
Buds

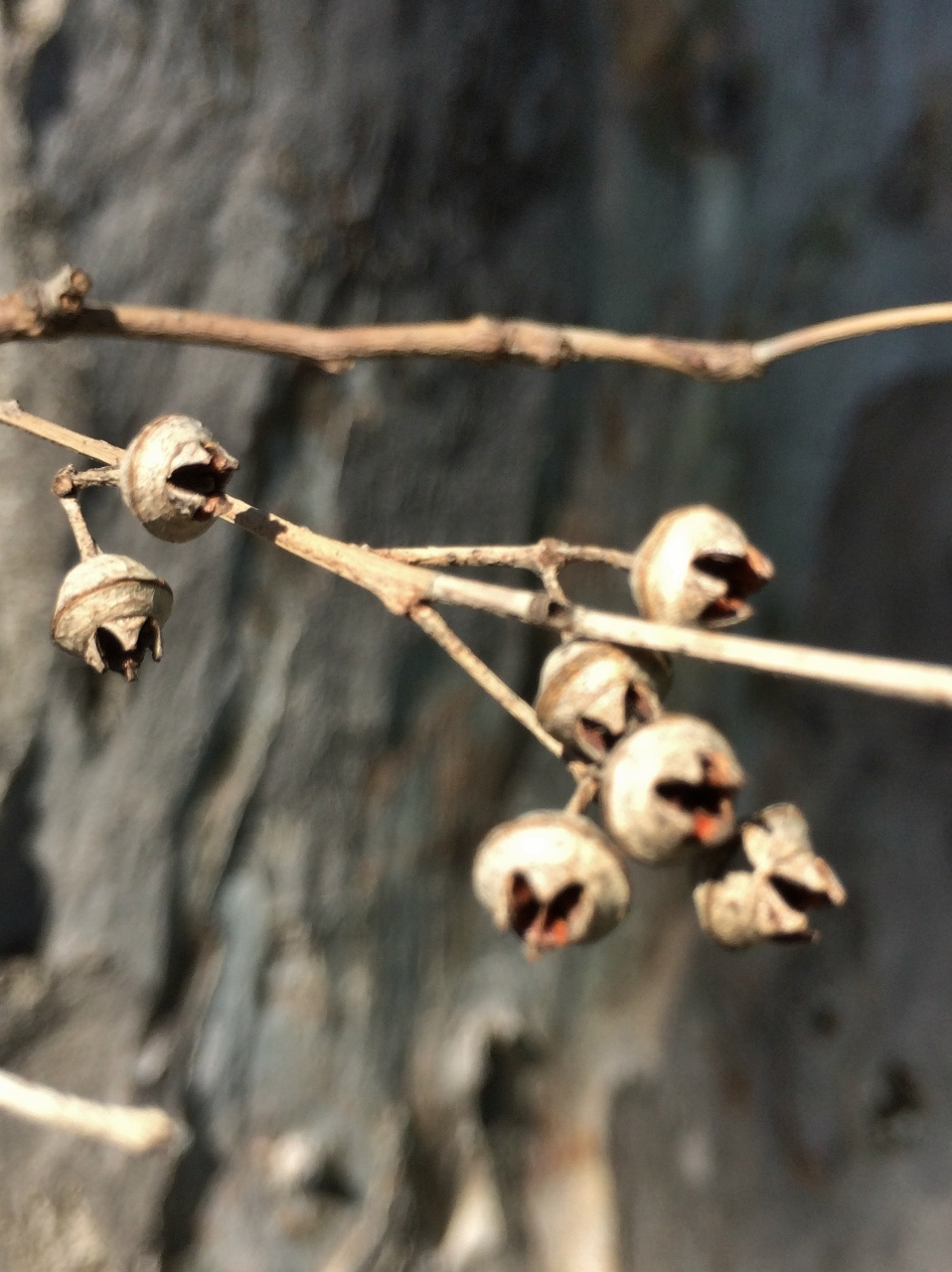
Fruit

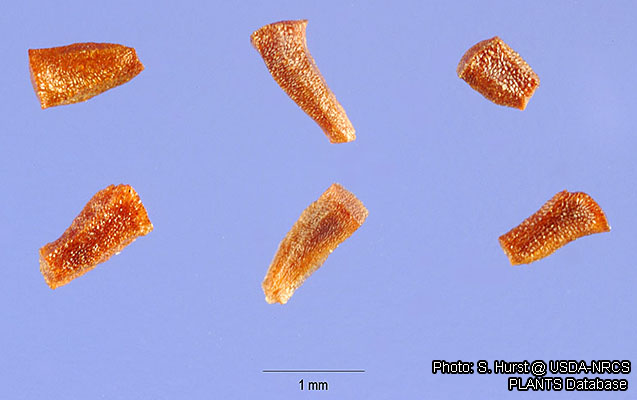
Seeds

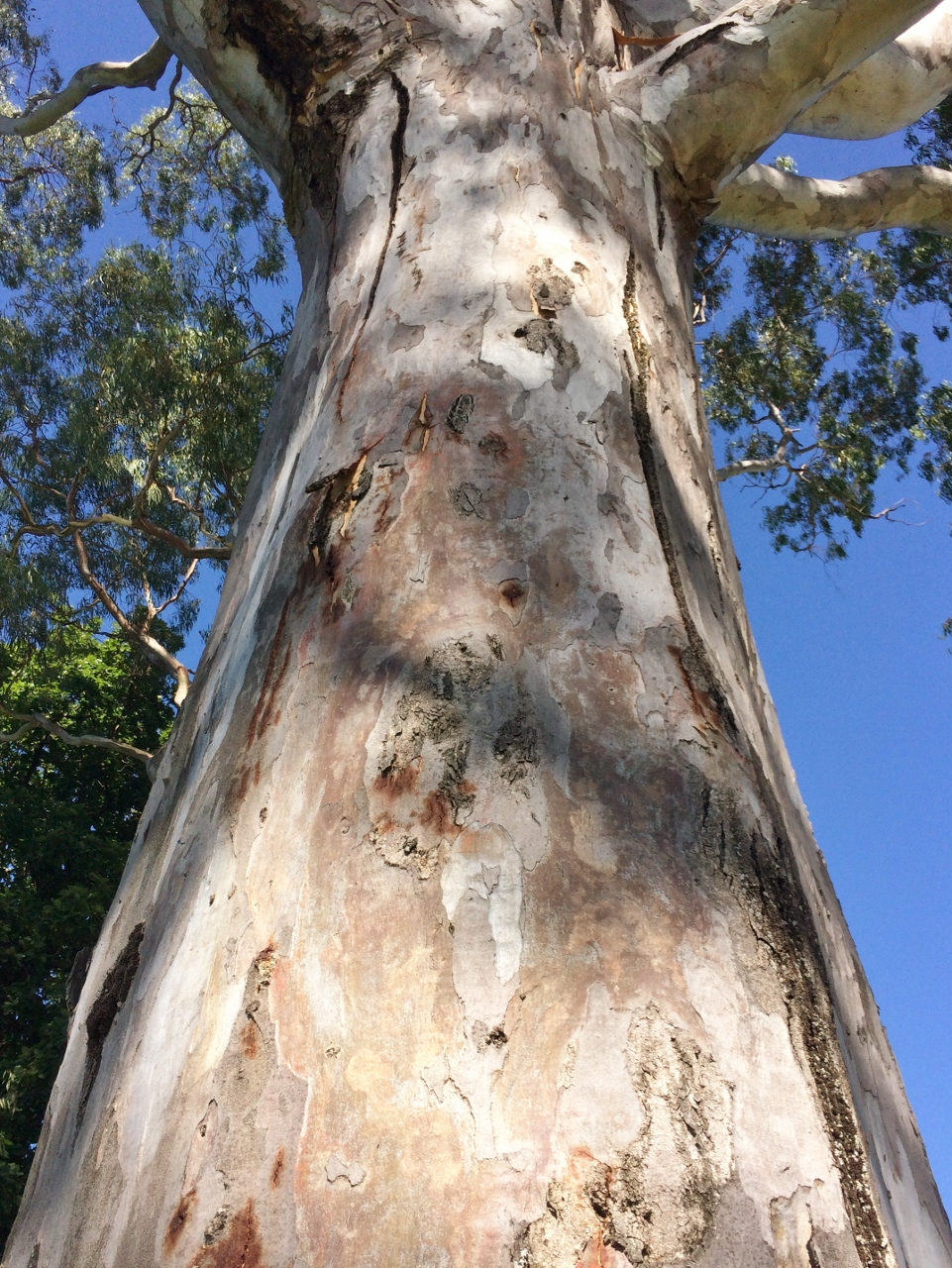
Trunk bark
Examples of river red gums

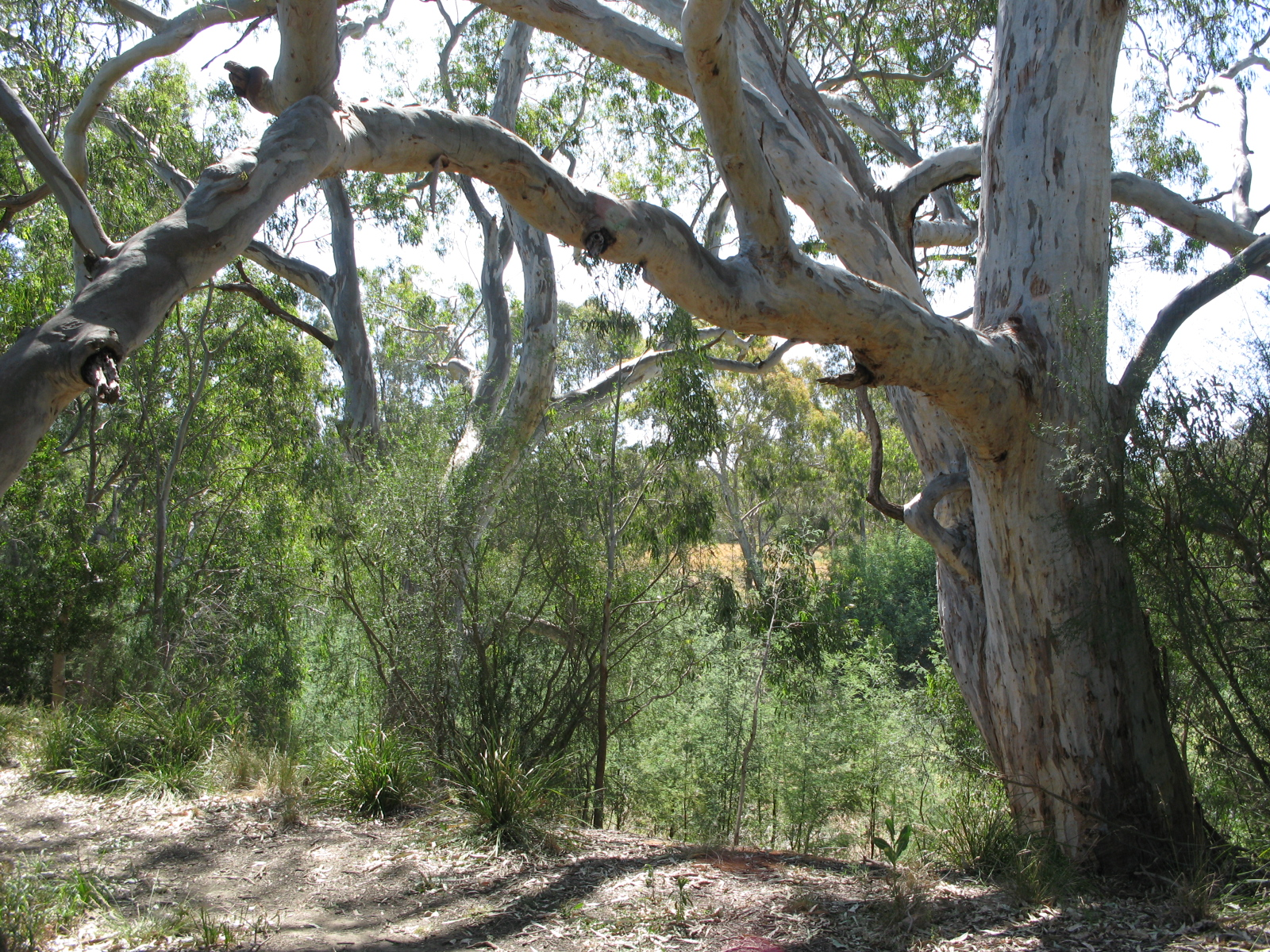
A river red gum near Bolin Bolin Billabong on the Yarra River.

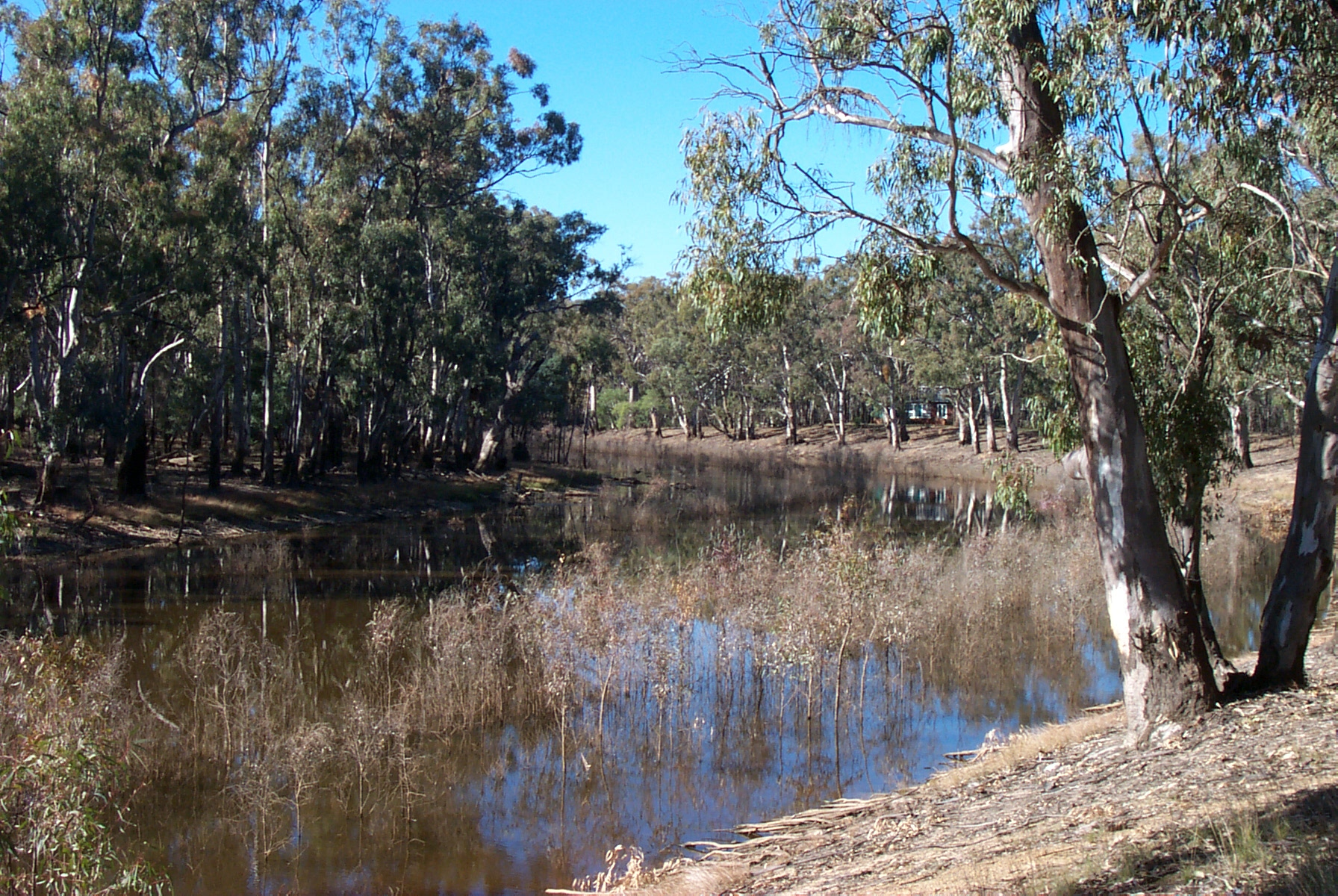
A view down the Murray River – every tree pictured is a river red gum.

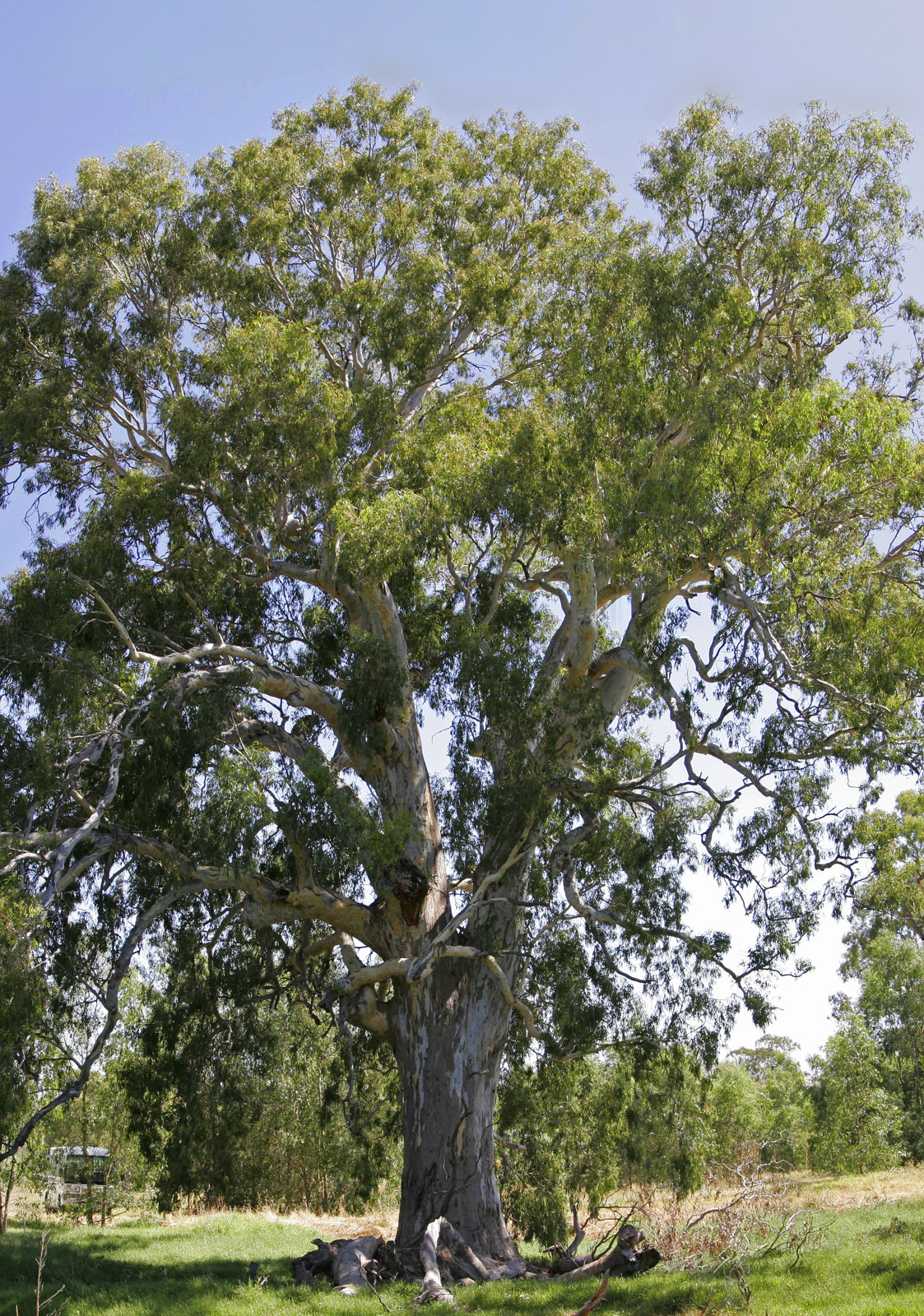
A 700-year-old tree at the Wonga Wetlands, NSW.

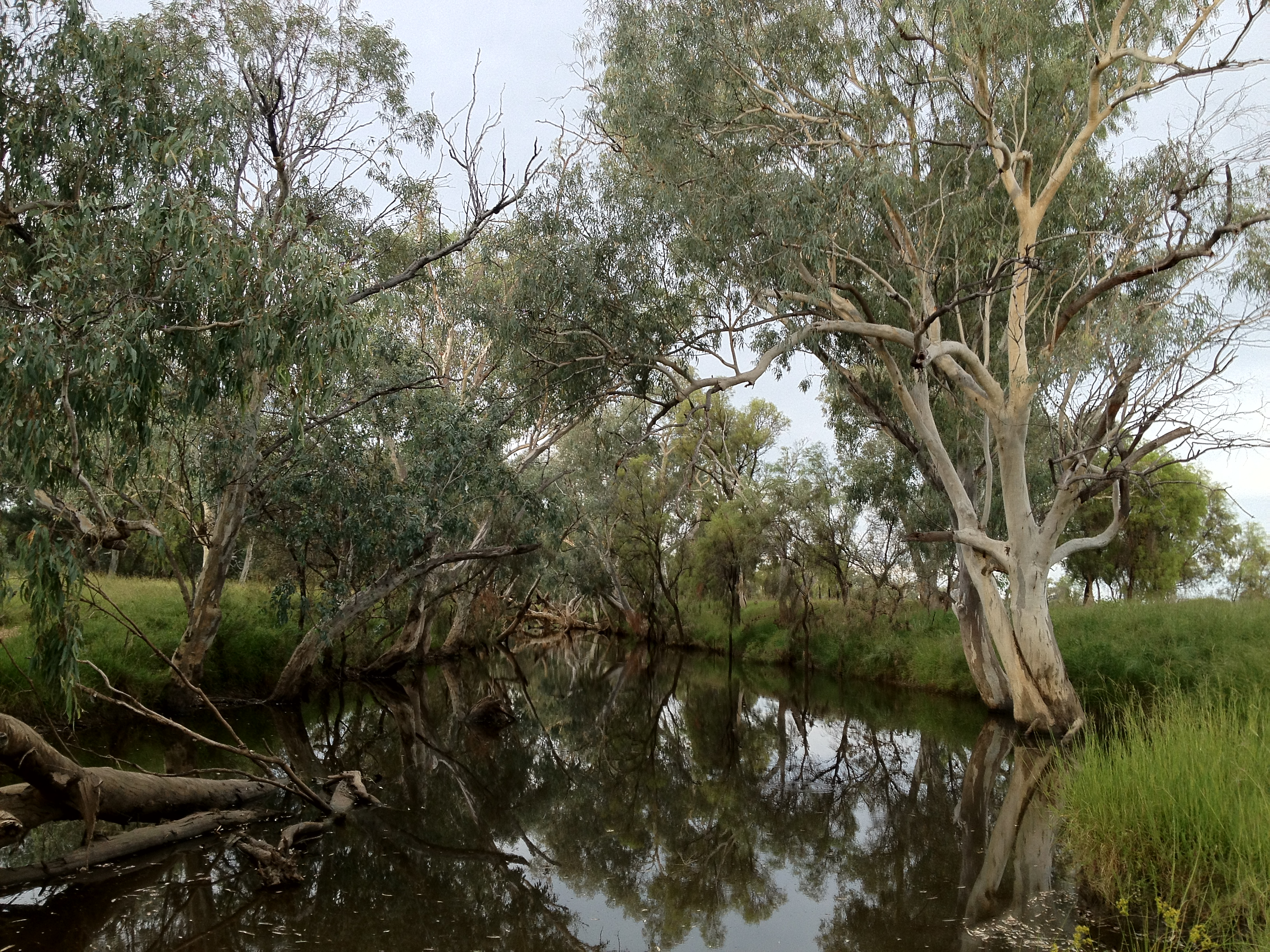
Many river red gums on the banks of the Barcoo River, south-west Queensland.

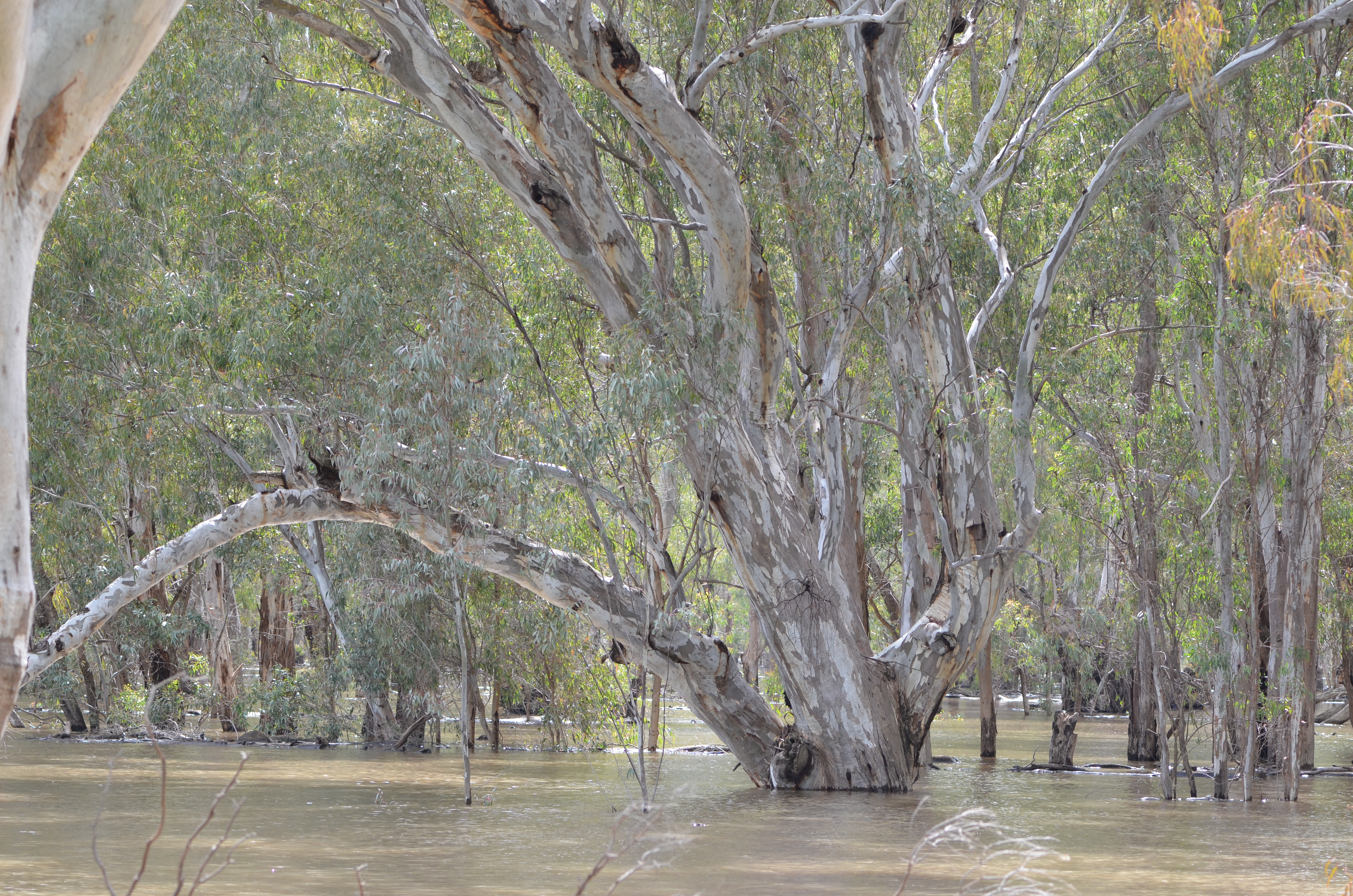
River red gums; the Murrumbidgee River in flood.

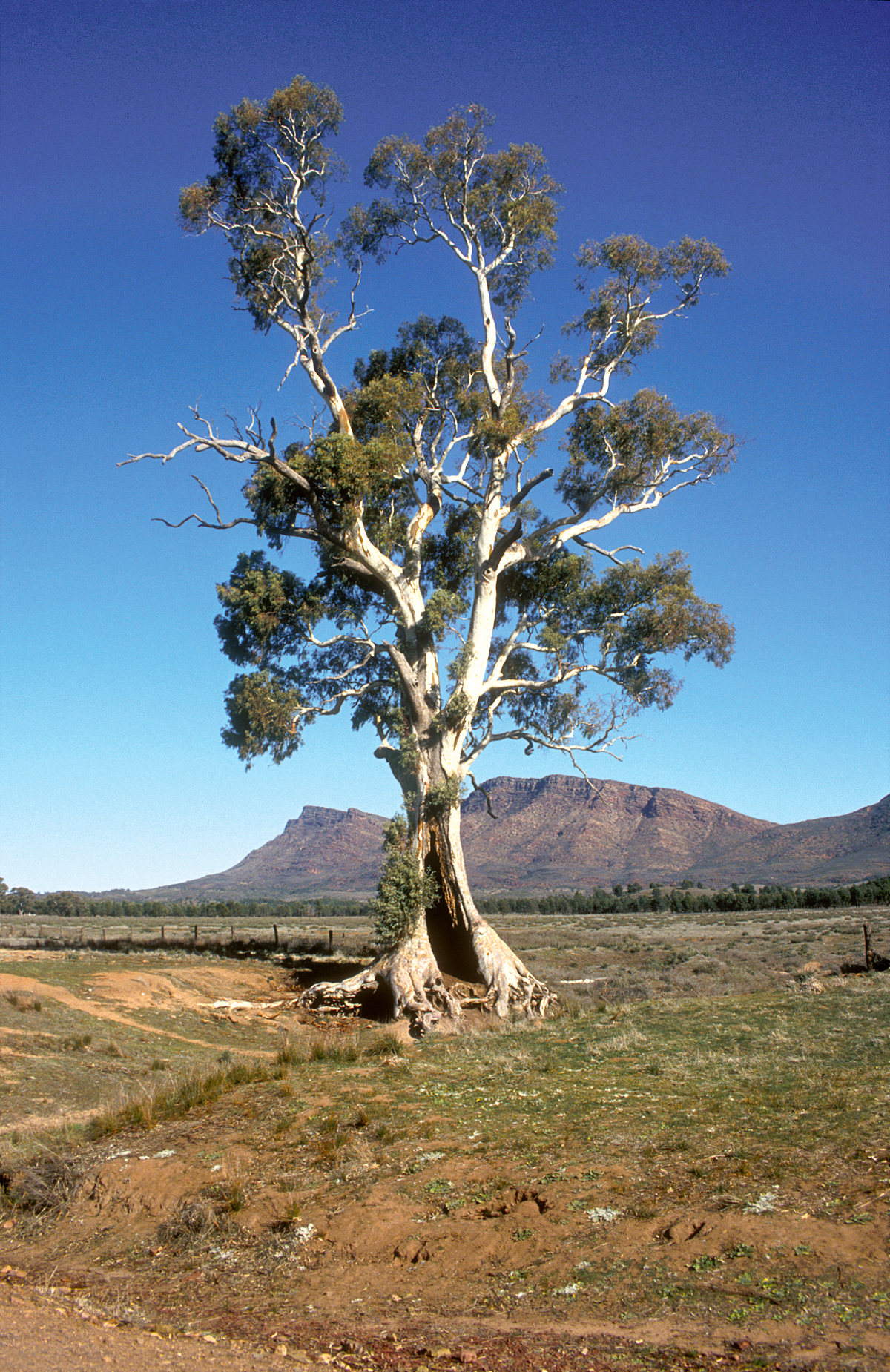
The Cazneaux Tree, near Wilpena Pound in Flinders Ranges National Park.

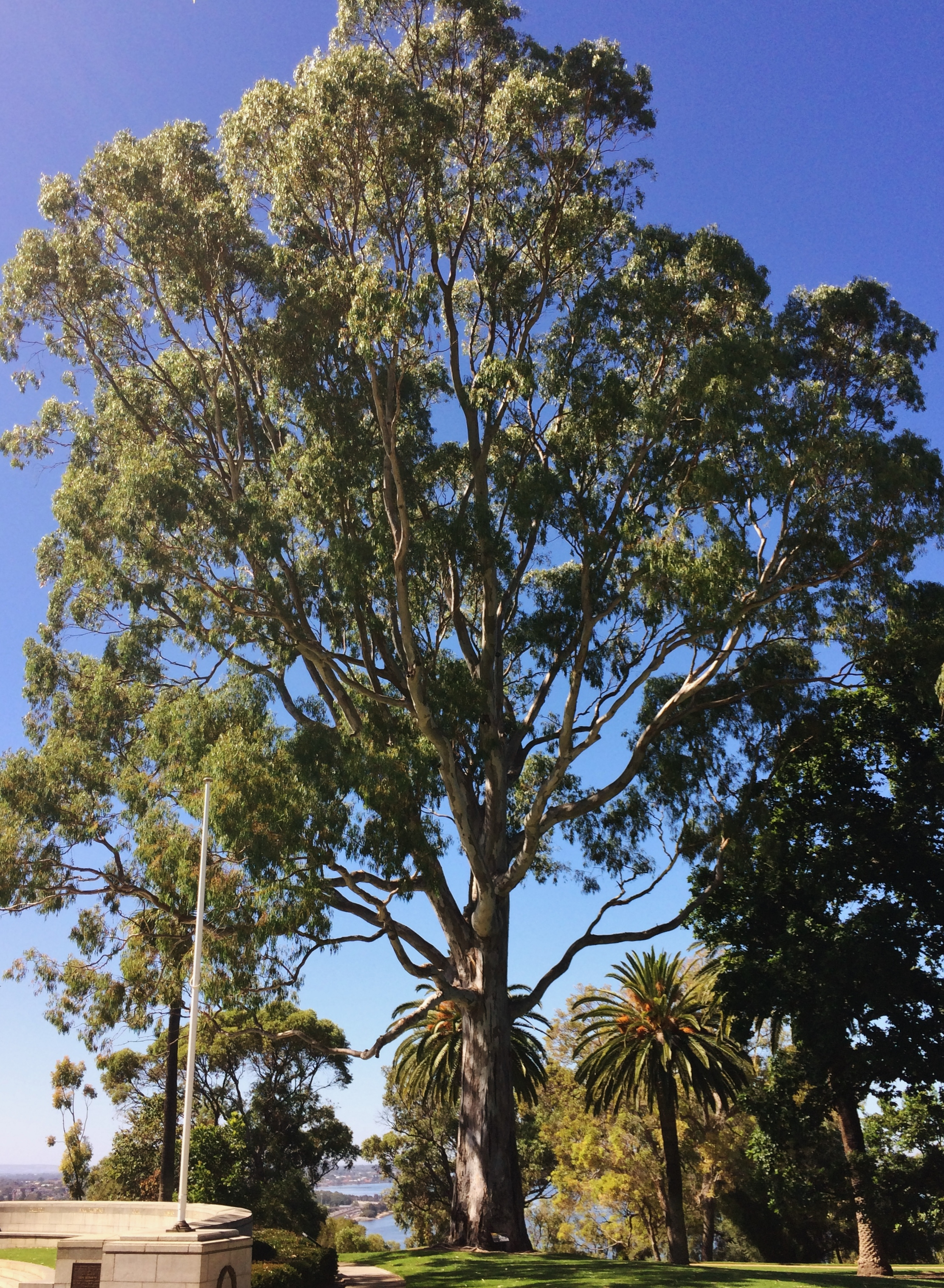
"The Queen's Tree", Kings Park, Perth, WA.

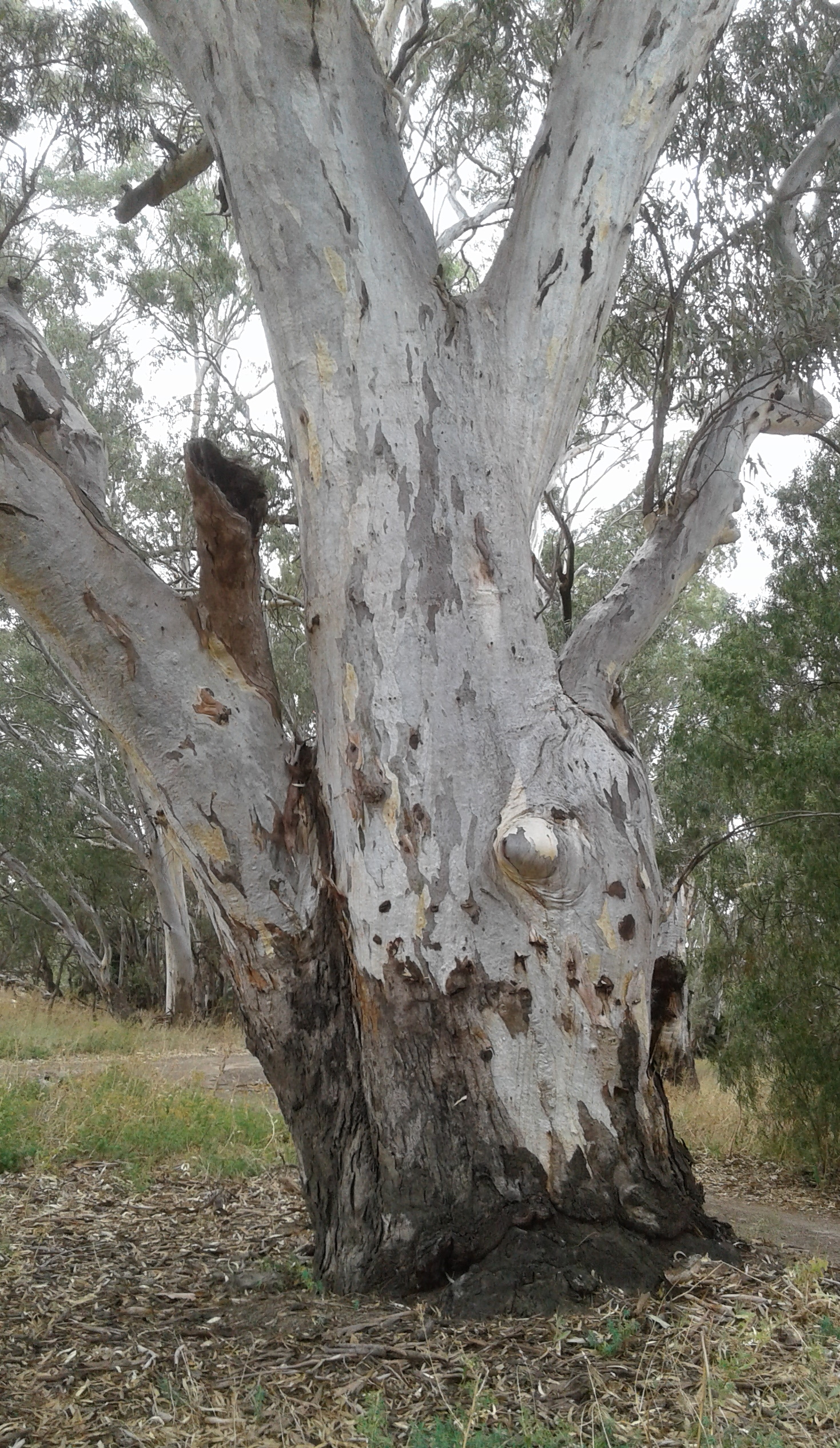
A river red gum in a bend of the Murrumbidgee River near Hay, NSW.

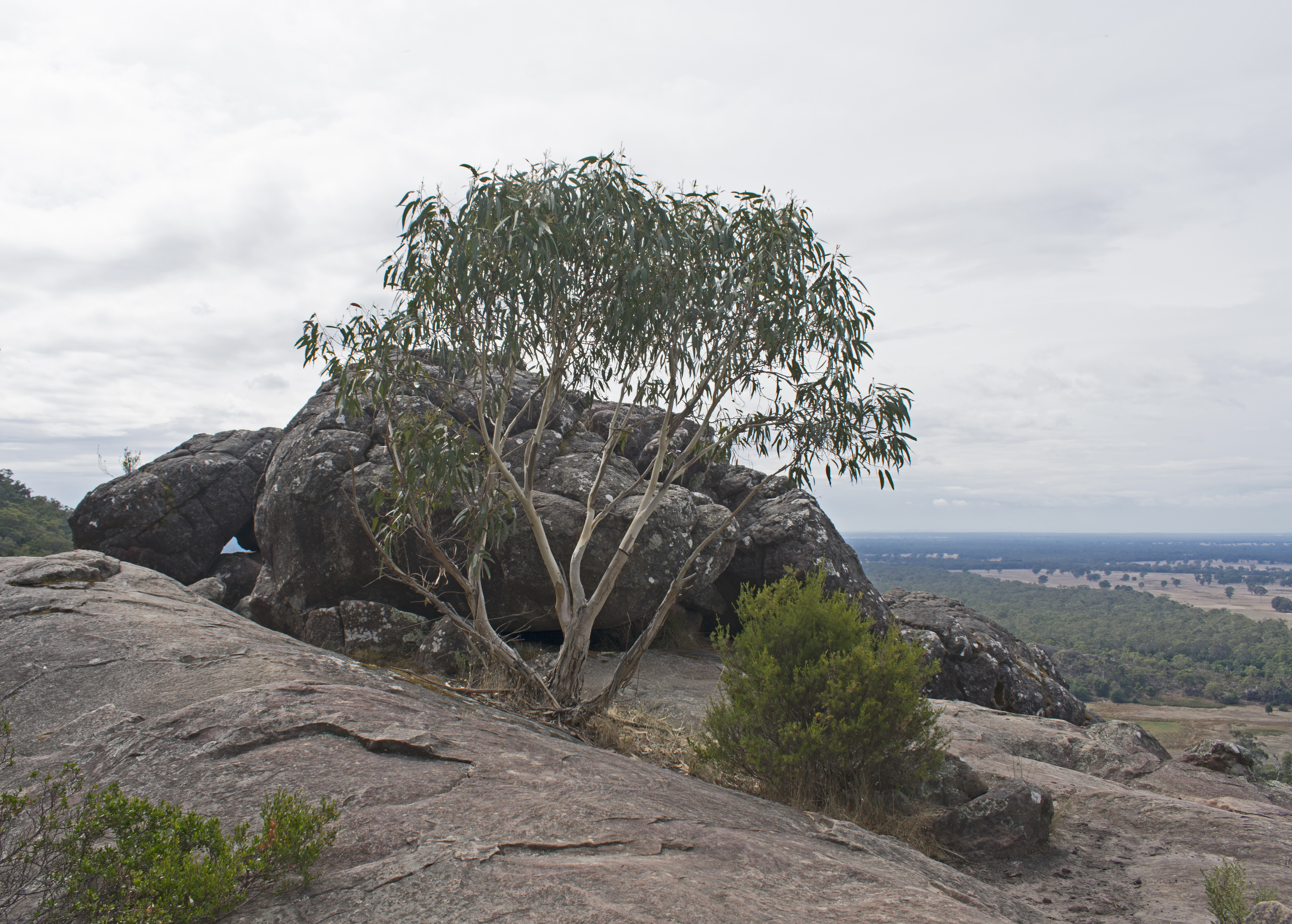
In Grampians National Park, Victoria.

== See also ==
- List of Eucalyptus species
- List of named Eucalyptus trees
- Mountain ash
- Alpine ash
- Snow gum
- Barmah National Park

== General references ==
- CSIRO, 2004. Eucalyptus camaldulensis Dehnh. River Red Gum.
- Mackay, Norman and David Eastburn (eds) 1990. The Murray. Murray-Darling Basin Commission, Canberra. ISBN 1-875209-05-0.
