= Friedrich Dehnhardt =

German botanist (1787–1870)

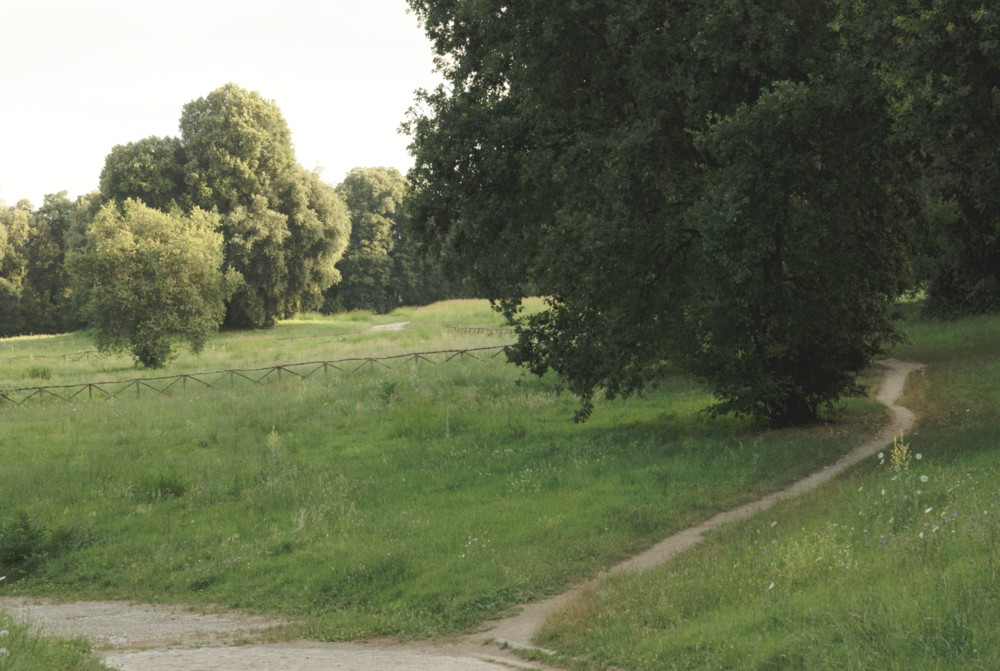
Scene in the park of Capodimonte

Friedrich Dehnhardt (22 September 1787, Buhle nr Göttingen – 1 May 1870, Naples) was chief gardener of "L'Hortus Camaldulensis di Napoli", or the Camaldoli gardens in Naples belonging to Francesco Ricciardi, Count of Camaldoli. It was from these gardens that Dehnhardt described the type specimen of Eucalyptus camaldulensis in 1832, presumably grown from seed sent by the botanist Allan Cunningham after a collecting trip in 1817 to Condobolin in New South Wales. These trees in Naples were cut down in the 1920s, suffering the same fate as the botanical description which remained lost for the best part of a century, only resurfacing in 1920.

Dehnhardt's collection of botanical specimens is housed in the Natural History Museum of Vienna in Austria. These early 19th century records of Eucalyptus species in Europe predate Ferdinand von Mueller's promotion of the genus. The park of Capodimonte, which is the main green lung of Naples, was landscaped by Dehnhardt in about 1840 with the masonry work being done by the Royal Site Architect Tommaso Giordano. Dehnhardt's grave is located in the English Cemetery in Naples.

== Publications ==
- Catalogus Plantarum Horti Camaldulensis (1st edition 1829, 2nd edition 1832)
