= Rawnsley Bluff =

- Bluff
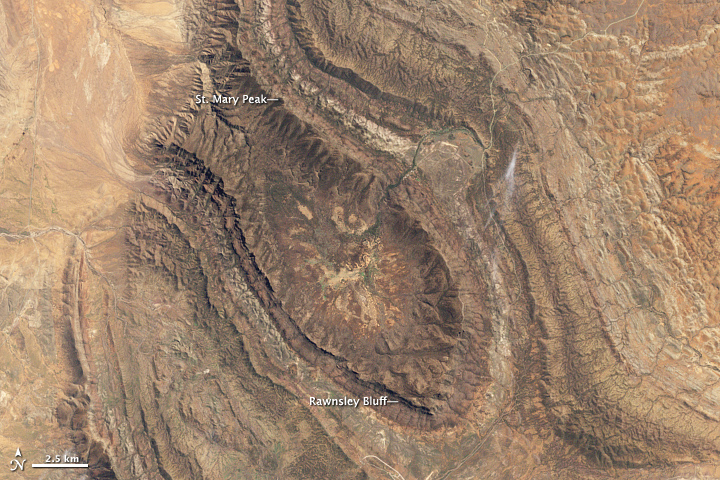
- Annotated view of Rawnsley's Bluff from space

- Location in South Australia Rawnsley Bluff (Australia)
- Coordinates: 31°37′24″S 138°36′37″E
- Location: Flinders Ranges, South Australia, Australia
- Range: Flinders Ranges
- Part of: Wilpena Pound
- Elevation: 943 m (3,094 ft)

Rawnsley Bluff (formerly Rawnsley's Bluff) is a geological feature in the Australian state of South Australia located within locality of Flinders Ranges and within the boundaries of the Ikara-Flinders Ranges National Park.

It is a bluff forming part of Wilpena Pound, situated to the south of St Mary Peak (St Mary Peak is the tallest in the Flinders Ranges at 3,825 feet (1,166 meters)). Rawnsley's Bluff connects the eastern and western mountain ranges of the pound.

The Adelaide Scotch College Cadet Unit used the bluff for training each year until the unit was disbanded in the early 1970s. Training included flights with helicopters, infantry training, and practice with infantry weapons such as mortars. The unit was recognized for offering outdoor adventures to the student body.

In the 1890s, a trigonometrical station, on the Rawnsley's Bluff to support surveying in South Australia.
