= Wilpena =

Wilpena may refer to:

- Wilpena Pound, geological feature in South Australia
- Wilpena Station, a former pastoral lease in South Australia
- Wilpena Island - refer List of islands within the Murray River in South Australia

== See also ==
- Wilpena Pound Airport - refer List of airports by IATA code: H
