= Adelaide Bushwalkers =

Bushwalking club in Adelaide, Australia

Adelaide Bushwalkers is a bushwalking club based in Adelaide, South Australia.

Founded in 1946, one of the oldest bushwalking clubs in Australia.

They have contributed to environmental causes such as tree planting, park proclamations and the mapping of remote areas in South Australia, including Wilpena Pound.

In 1957 they produced a detailed map of Wilpena Pound which included creeks, ridges, tracks, prominent features and water supplies. The Tourist Bureau printed the map. They marked and cut a track to the summit of St Mary Peak. In 1959 further tracks were cut to nearby Mt Ohlssen-Bagge, and further afield in Mambray Creek and Waterfall Gully.

In 1966 they used a theodolite and aneroid barometers to establish spot heights of mountain peaks between Brachina Gorge and Parachilna Gorge, in the Flinders Ranges. They also suggested Aboriginal names for many of the features.

The committee and all Walk leaders are volunteers. All new club leaders are mentored by other recognised club leaders.

Their speciality is multi-day hikes carrying packs and camping out, often off track across private land (with landowner permission). They also do day walks, kayaking and cycling. They walk around Adelaide and South Australia, including the Mt Lofty Ranges, Flinders Ranges, Coorong and Riverland. They also conduct walks in the Grampians in western Victoria and along the Heysen Trail. Members also organise extended club walks to Tasmania, Victoria, the Australian Alps, New Zealand and the Himalyala in India and Nepal.
