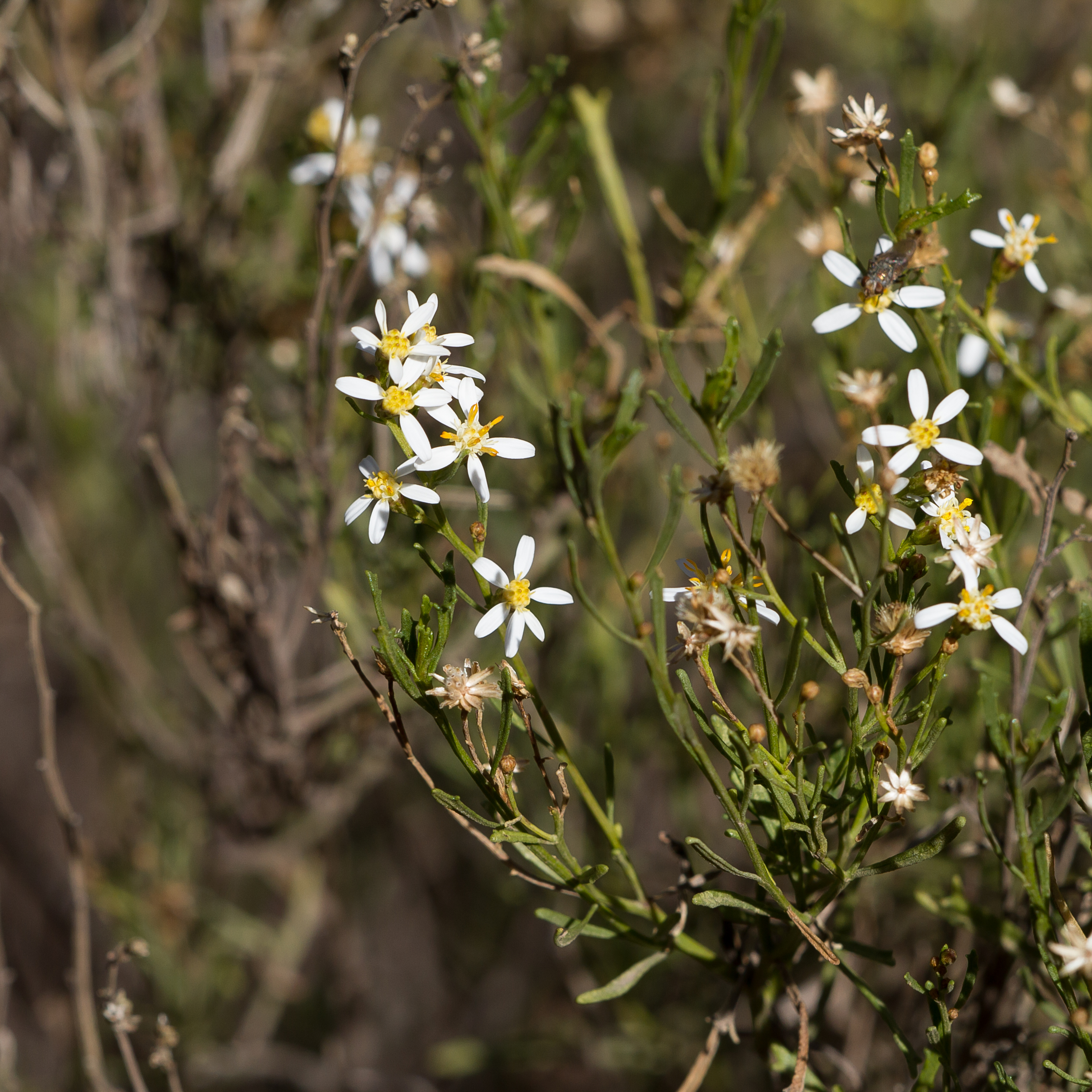
- In Ikara–Flinders Ranges National Park

Scientific classification
- Kingdom: Plantae
- Clade: Tracheophytes
- Clade: Angiosperms
- Clade: Eudicots
- Clade: Asterids
- Order: Asterales
- Family: Asteraceae
- Genus: Olearia
- Species: O. decurrens

Binomial name
- Olearia decurrens (DC.) Benth.

Synonyms
- Aster decurrens (DC.) F.Muell. nom. illeg.; Eurybia decurrens DC.; Shawia decurrens (DC.) Sch.Bip.

= Olearia decurrens =

Species of shrub

Olearia decurrens, commonly known as the clammy daisy bush, is a species of flowering plant in the family Asteraceae and is endemic to arid, inland Australia. It is a glabrous, sticky, twiggy shrub with narrow egg-shaped to linear leaves sometimes with toothed edges, and white and yellow, daisy-like inflorescences.

== Description ==
Olearia decurrens is a glabrous, sticky, twiggy shrub that typically grows to 1–2 m (3 ft 3 in – 6 ft 7 in) high and wide with many ribbed branches. The leaves are bright green and arranged alternately along the stems, egg-shaped or lance-shaped with the narrower end towards the base, to linear, 7–48 mm (0.28–1.89 in) long and 1–5 mm (0.039–0.197 in) wide, sometimes with toothed edges, and more or less sessile. The heads or daisy-like "flowers" are arranged in panicles on the ends of branchlets and 15–20 mm (0.59–0.79 in) in diameter with a bell-shaped involucre 3–4 mm (0.12–0.16 in) long. There are three to six ray florets, the white, petal-like ligules 3–4 mm (0.12–0.16 in) long surrounding five to seven yellow disc florets. Flowering mainly occurs from February to May and the fruit is a silky-hairy achene about 2 mm (0.079 in) long, the pappus with 35 to 65 bristles in two rows.

== Taxonomy ==
This species was first formally described in 1836 Swiss botanist Augustin Pyramus de Candolle who gave it the name Eurybia decurrens in the fifth volume of his Prodromus Systematis Naturalis Regni Vegetabilis, from material collected by Allan Cunningham in the vicinity of the Lachlan River. In 1867, George Bentham changed the name to Olearia decurrens in Flora Australiensis. The species name decurrens means "decurrent" and refers to the leaf base running down the stem.

== Distribution and habitat ==
Olearia decurrens grows in mallee scrub and forest in arid areas and is found across inland Australia, from Dubbo and Brewarrina in New South Wales, westwards across inland Victoria and South Australia and into Western Australia where it is found in the Gascoyne, Gibson Desert, Great Victoria Desert and Murchison biogeographic regions.

== Use in horticulture ==
Seldom seen in cultivation, O. decurrens is drought- and frost-tolerant. It grows best in sunny or part-shaded locations with good drainage. Pruning prevents plants from becoming too spindly or leggy.
