= Leioproctus ciliatus =

Scientific classification
- Kingdom: Animalia
- Phylum: Arthropoda
- Clade: Pancrustacea
- Class: Insecta
- Order: Hymenoptera
- Family: Colletidae
- Genus: Leioproctus
- Species: L. ciliatus

Binomial name
- Leioproctus ciliatus Maynard 2013

Synonyms
- Goniocolletes ciliatus Maynard, 2013

Species of bee

Leioproctus ciliatus, or Leioproctus (Goniocolletes) ciliatus, is a species of bee in the family Colletidae and subfamily Colletinae. It is endemic to Australia. It was described by Australian entomologist Glynn Maynard in 2013.

== Etymology ==
The specific epithet ciliatus (Latin: "ciliate") is an anatomical reference to the inner hind tibial spur of the female.

== Description ==
Female body length is about 10 mm. Integumental colouration is mainly black, the metasoma orange. The hair is white to off-white.

== Distribution and habitat ==
The species occurs in inland South Australia. The type locality is 34 km south of Wilpena.

== Behaviour ==
The adults are flying mellivores. Flowering plants visited by the bees include Eucalyptus species.
