= Cazneaux Tree =

Famous tree in South Australia

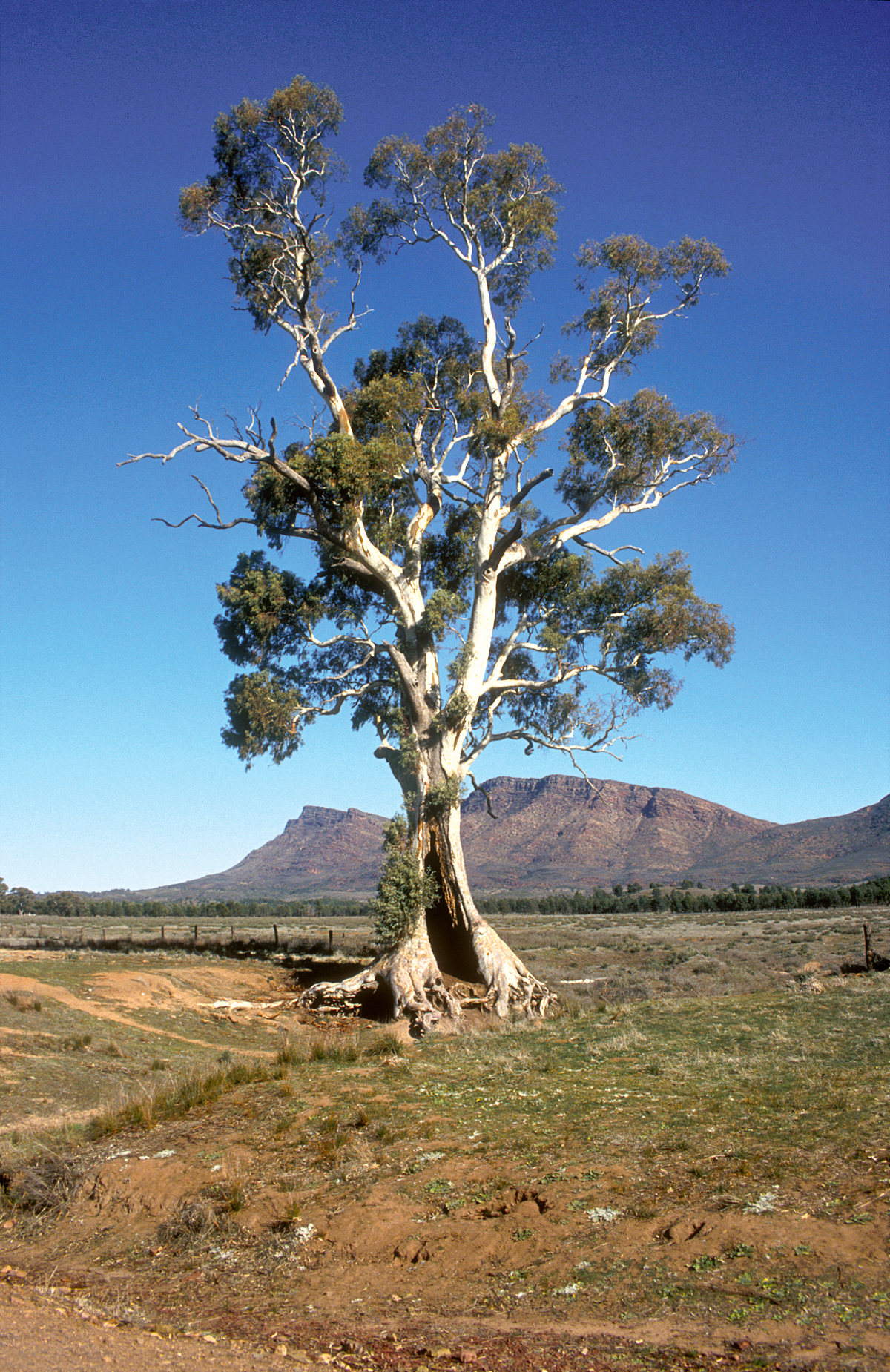
- In 1992

- Location in South Australia
- 31°31′13″S 138°38′14″E
- Location: Flinders Ranges, South Australia, Australia within the Ikara-Flinders Ranges National Park.

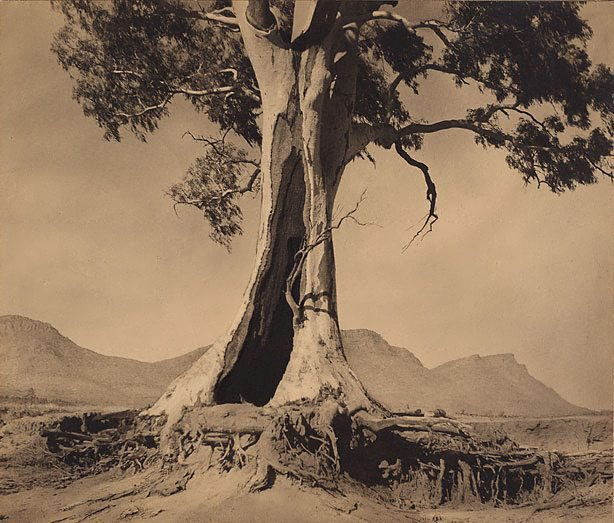
Spirit of endurance or 'The Cazneaux Tree', 1937

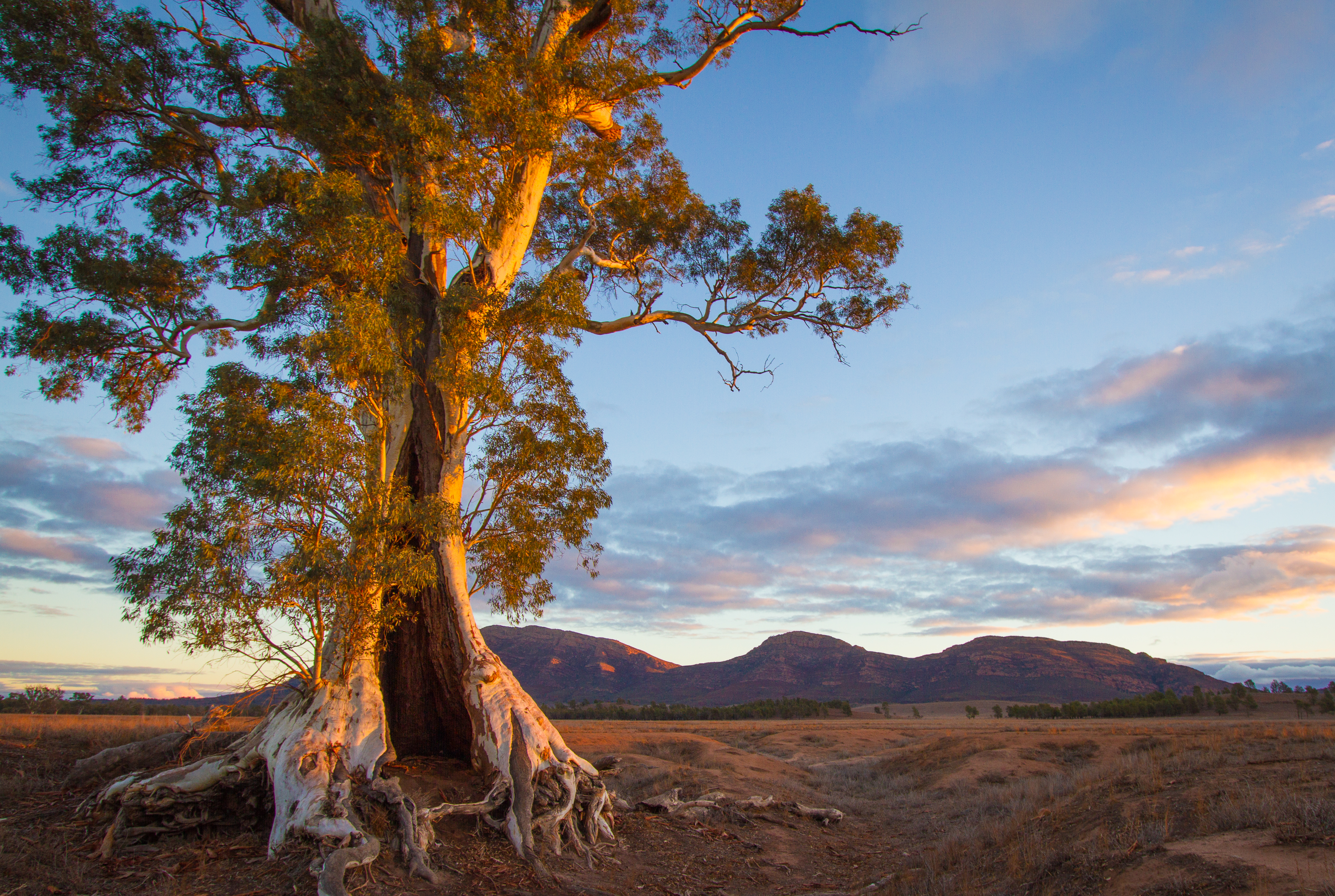
Cazneaux Tree in 2013

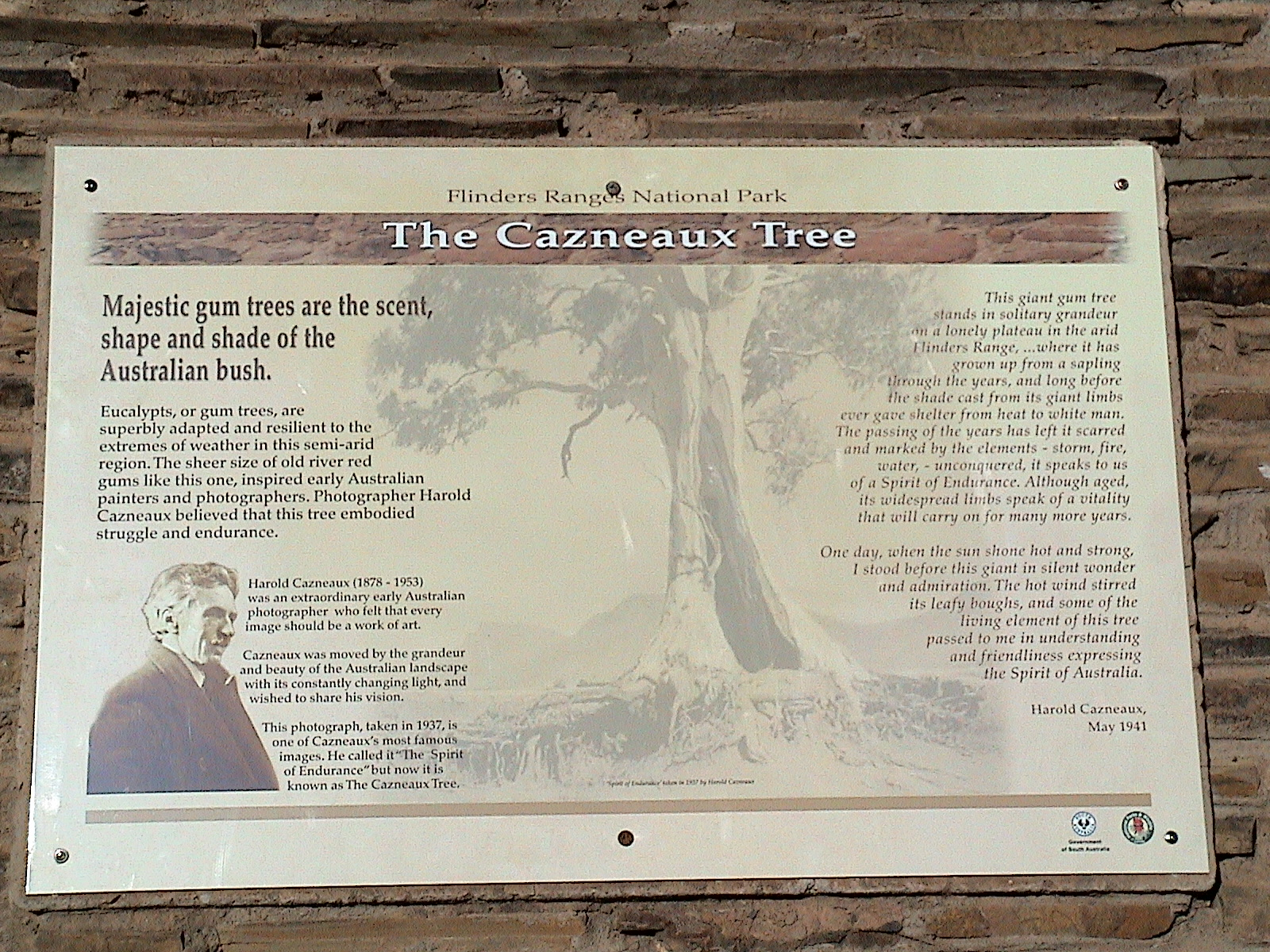
Interpretive sign for the Cazneaux Tree, in the Ikara-Flinders Ranges National Park

The Cazneaux Tree, also known as Cazneaux's Tree, is a Eucalyptus camaldulensis or river red gum that was made famous by the photographer Harold Cazneaux. It is in the Australian state of South Australia in the locality of Flinders Ranges near Wilpena Pound. The tree is located within the boundaries of the Ikara-Flinders Ranges National Park on the west side of the Flinders Ranges Way about 3 kilometres (1.9 mi) north-east of the Wilpena Pound Resort.

The tree was listed by the National Trust of South Australia as significant tree number 239 on the trust's Register of Significant Trees because of "its outstanding aesthetic beauty".

The tree was photographed in 1937 by Cazneaux in a picture entitled The Spirit of Endurance which brought him international recognition. The tree is now an important landmark and a tourist drawcard for the area, attracting photographers and artists.

With a height of 29 metres (95 ft) and a circumference at the base of 11.4 metres (37 ft) the tree dominates the otherwise flat arid plateau composed primarily of grasslands.

A plaque funded by Cazneaux's grandson, Dick Smith, was placed at the site in 1991.

== See also ==
- List of named Eucalyptus trees
- List of individual trees
