= Mawson Trail =

Trail in South Australia

Coordinates: 31°05′35″S 138°40′51″E

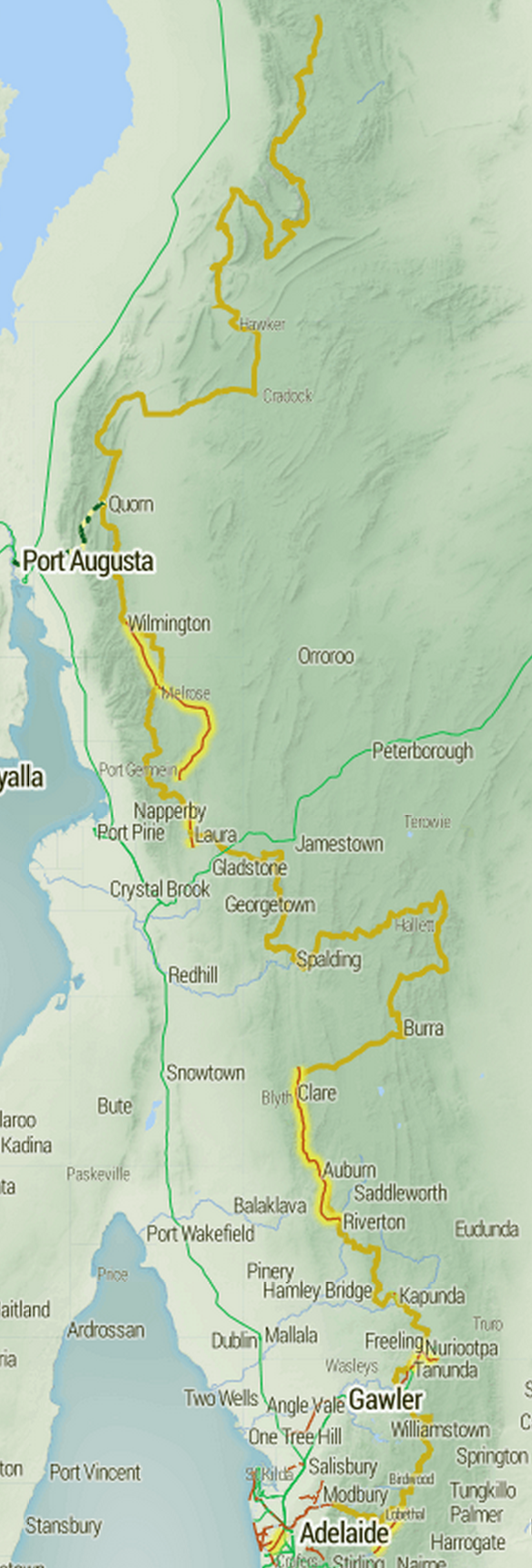

The Mawson Trail is a long-distance cycling and walking trail in South Australia, stretching from the Adelaide Hills to Blinman in the Flinders Ranges. It was developed by a group of cyclists in the 1990s.

== History ==
In early 1990, a group of SA Touring Cyclists' Association (SATCA; now Bicycle SA) members had ridden from Blinman to Adelaide to test out a route for an off-road cycling trail. In June 1990, a group of cyclists representing SATCA, the Cycling Protection Association (now Bicycle Institute of SA), the Cycling for Pleasure Group, and the Mountain Bike Club (now Adelaide MTB Club) met to plan the new trail. Volunteers then started marking out and then establishing a trail, using state forest and national park fire trails, farm access tracks, unmade or unused roads, and roads with very low traffic on them.

The trail was later named after geologist and Antarctic explorer Douglas Mawson, who had carried out geological studies in the Flinders Ranges.

== Description ==
The cycling and walking trail starts just east of Adelaide in the Adelaide Hills and extends almost 900 kilometres (560 mi) to Blinman in the Flinders Ranges. It is suitable for mountain bikes.

The Mawson Trail traverses remote areas of the Mount Lofty and Flinders Ranges, mostly away from bitumen roads, and often off-road on tracks and unmade road or forest reserves. It also passes through a number of country towns. It starts at the upstream end of the Torrens Linear Park on Gorge Road, leading into the Adelaide Hills, so that it is directly connected by dedicated pedestrian and cycleway to the coast at West Beach.

Since 2002, Bicyle SA has hosted a guided two-week tour of the entire length every second year.

=== Route ===
The route is generally described south-to-north, although it can be ridden in either direction. Signage along the route is provided for both directions.

The towns passed through are:

- Adelaide (outskirts)
- Lobethal, a historic town with German settler history
- Birdwood, home of the National Motor Museum
- Rowland Flat, a town in the Barossa Valley
- Tanunda, a large town with bakeries, pubs and cafes in the Barossa Valley
- Nuriootpa, main commercial centre of the Barossa valley
- Kapunda, with cafes, supermarkets and pubs
- Riverton, with pubs and cafes
- Auburn, with a pub and cafes
- Clare, a large town with a large supermarket, bike shop and cafes
- Burra, a large historical town with several pubs, supermarkets and cafes
- Hallett, with a service station/general store and a pub
- Spalding, with a general store and pub with barbed wire museum
- (Near Jamestown)
- Laura, with a supermarket and cafes
- Melrose, with a bike shop cafe, two pubs, and several cafes
- Wilmington, with a pub, general store and cafe
- Quorn, a large historical town with four pubs and several cafes
- Cradock, a tiny hamlet with a pub
- Hawker, a small town with a roadhouse/general store and a cafe
- Rawnsley Park Station, a caravan park with pub and general store
- Wilpena, a very large caravan and campsite with pub, general store and information office
- Blinman, a small tourist village with pub and mine tours

== See also ==
- List of long-distance hiking tracks in Australia
