= Henry Strong Price =

Australian sheep pastoralist

Henry Strong Price (8 May 1825 – 30 November 1889), generally known as H.S. Price, or simply Harry Price, was a pioneer sheep pastoralist of South Australia, best known as founder and proprietor of Wilpena Station at Wilpena Pound, now part of the Ikara-Flinders Ranges National Park.

== Early life ==
Born at Marlborough, Wiltshire on 8 May 1825, Price was the second son of Peninsula War veteran Captain David Molloy Price of the 36th Regiment, and Mary, nee Strong. His elder brother, who remained in England, was Dr. Richard Edmonds Price (1822-1900), M.R.C.S., a captain in the Royal Wiltshire Yeomanry and a mayor of Marlborough.

Seeking adventure and fortune in his own right, Price arrived in South Australia as a cabin passenger on the barque Fortitude in April 1842, just a month before his seventeenth birthday. The newly arrived youth became connected that same year with Charles Campbell, a livestock overlander from New South Wales. In January 1843 Campbell and Price took out an occupation licence for a grazing run in the Mid North of South Australia at Hill River, their resident stock keeper being William Roach. By 1844 Campbell and Price had parted, moving on to other interests. In the case of Price, he had soon expanded his pastoralist pursuits to include both the Mid North and Eyre Peninsula.

Price eventually made his way over to nearby Booborowie Station, owned by brothers William Browne and John Browne, both medical doctors, also from Wiltshire, with whom he then began a lasting and intimate connection. He not only managed some of their pastoral interests, but also went into working partnerships with them. As well, years later, the Price and Browne families became related when Harry Price's daughter, Helen Mary, married to Leonard, eldest son of Dr William Browne.

Another daughter of Price, Florence Annie Price, married John Jervois, eldest son of Sir William Jervois, Governor of South Australia 1877-83. Governor Jervois named the Yorke Peninsula coastal township of Price after her.

Harry Price was a busy young man. In 1851 he pioneered and then managed the Browne's 800 square mile Wilpena Station in the Flinders Ranges, which included the recently discovered Wilpena Pound, a spectacular natural amphitheatre. In doing so he selected the picturesque site for the first homestead, beside Wilpena Creek, upon a flat studded with noble native pines and majestic red gums, flanked by the soaring range of the pound.

== Canowie Station ==
When the Brown brothers rented out the Wilpena run in 1853, Price moved back south to manage their Canowie run, the former manager William Warwick having resigned to take up his own Holowiliena run. For nearly four years Price ran Canowie for the Brownes, gaining a half share interest through monetary input and labour. Due to the economic depression in South Australia which followed the Victorian gold rush, Price made few improvements to Canowie, which was sold in January 1858.

== Wilpena Station ==
Nevertheless, as a result of the Canowie sale Price was able to buy Wilpena in his own right in 1861, paying £40,400 to the Browne brothers for the lease, including livestock comprising some 17,000 sheep. That same year, 1861, copper mines opened at Blinman and Wilpena homestead was directly on the busy road between Kanyaka and Blinman. Wilpena was paradise for Price, who was destined to hold it for nearly four decades.

Price had many successes at Wilpena, at times shearing huge numbers of sheep, but he was also much reduced by droughts, particularly that of 1864-66. In common with pastoralist stations in remote districts, he established a small village of buildings including homestead, blacksmith's shop, store, workers' cottages, cemetery, stables, yards, and shearing shed. He also authorised an eating house to cater for travellers thronging the Blinman road.

Although Price owned Wilpena Station until his death, in later years he employed resident managers and overseers while he generally resided in suburban Adelaide at his Mitcham estate, Delamere. From there he presided over not only his own pastoralism interests but also those of Dr William Browne, for whom he held power of attorney. He also held several directorships and successfully invested in Broken Hill mining shares. He died at Mitcham on 30 November 1889, aged 65. His wife Ellen died just five days later, on 4 December 1889. Both are interred at Mitcham Cemetery.

His portrait and biography appear in Pastoral Pioneers of South Australia, volume II, pp 40–41.
