= Ediacara =

Ediacara may refer to:

== Places ==
- Ediacara, South Australia, a locality in South Australia
- Ediacara Hills, a range of hills in the northern Flinders Ranges, South Australia
- Nilpena Ediacara National Park, formerly Ediacara Conservation Park, South Australia

== Other ==
- Ediacaria, discoidal fossil animal once thought to be a jellyfish
- The Ediacaran geological time period, named after the Ediacara Hills
- The Ediacaran biota, the oldest known complex multicellular life
