= Ikara–Flinders Ranges National Park =

National park in South Australia

- IUCN category II (national park)
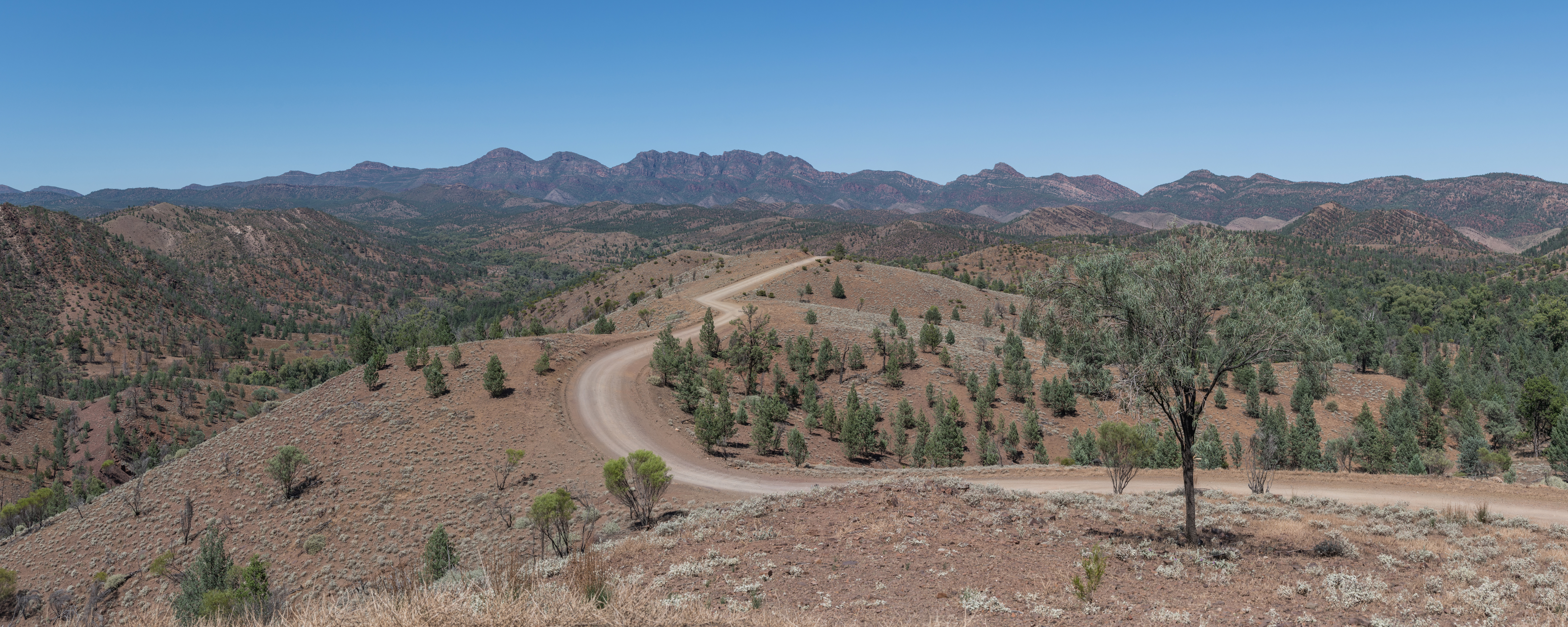
- Razorback Lookout in Ikara–Flinders Ranges National Park

- Location within South Australia
- Location: South Australia
- Nearest city: Hawker
- Coordinates: 31°25′20″S 138°42′18″E
- Area: 933.97 km^{2} (360.61 sq mi)
- Established: 1 January 1945
- Governing body: National Parks and Wildlife Service South Australia
- Website: Official website

The Ikara–Flinders Ranges National Park, formerly Flinders Ranges National Park, is a national park situated approximately 430 km (270 mi) north of Adelaide, Australia. It lies northeast of the small town of Hawker, in the northern central part of South Australia's largest mountain range, the Flinders Ranges, and covers an area of 95,000 ha (370 mi^{2}) between Hawker and Blinman. It is known for the land formation known as Wilpena Pound, while other well-known features include the Heysen Range and the Brachina and Bunyeroo gorges. The Heysen Trail and Mawson Trail pass through the park.

The whole park is part of the Flinders Ranges geological successions, where abundant and diverse arrays of fossils show how animal life began on Earth over a period of 350 million years. Within the park, on Enorama Creek, there is a Global Boundary Stratotype Section and Point (GSSP, or "Golden Spike"), ratified by the International Commission on Stratigraphy in 2004. The GSSP defines the lower boundary of the Ediacaran period, then recently recognised for the first time. As well as containing a large number of heritage-listed sites, Ikara–Flinders Ranges National Park is one of a group of seven geographically separate areas that were submitted to the UNESCO World Heritage Centre for consideration as a World Heritage Site in 2021, and as of August 2025 remain on the tentative list.

== History ==
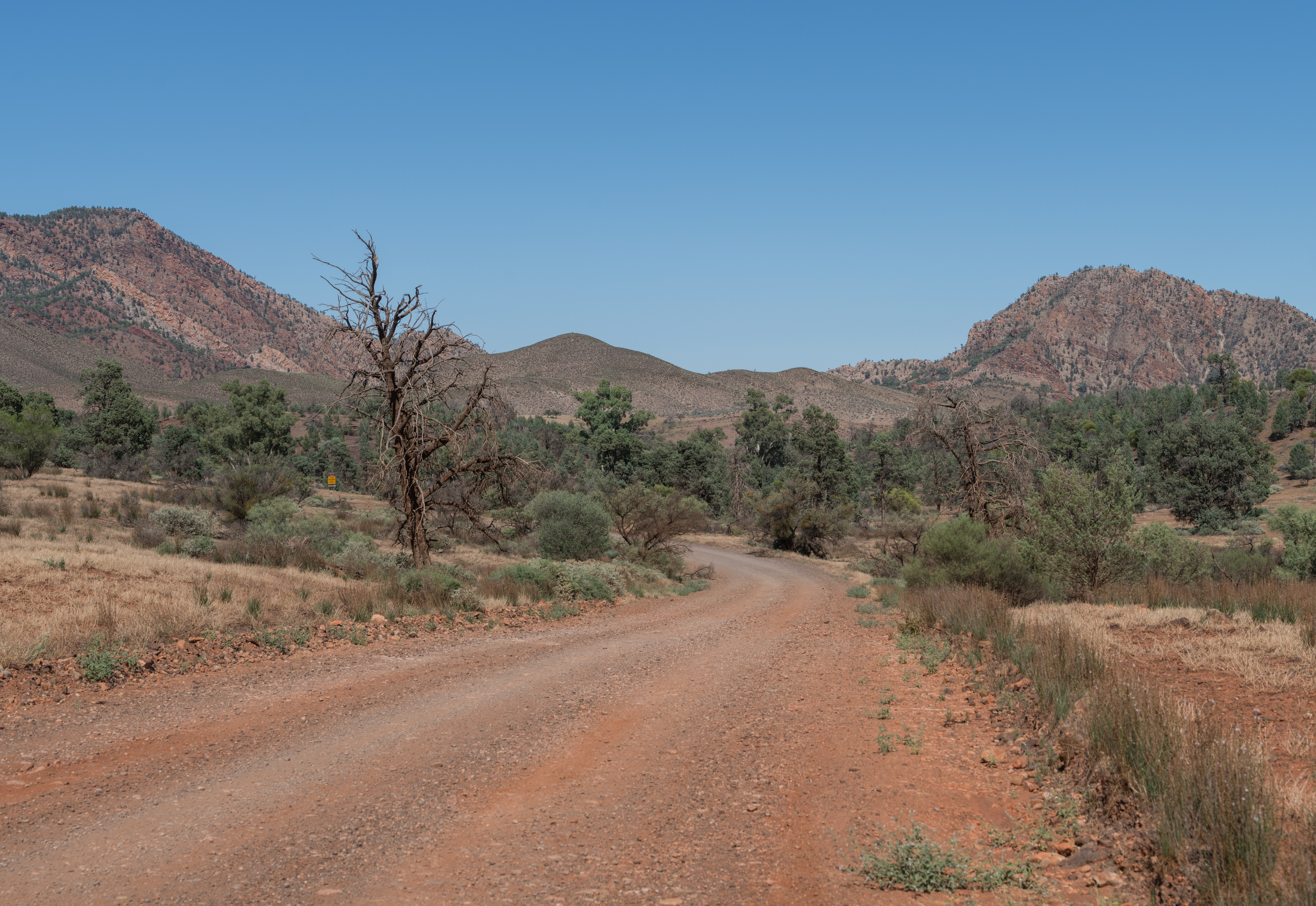
Brachina Gorge Road

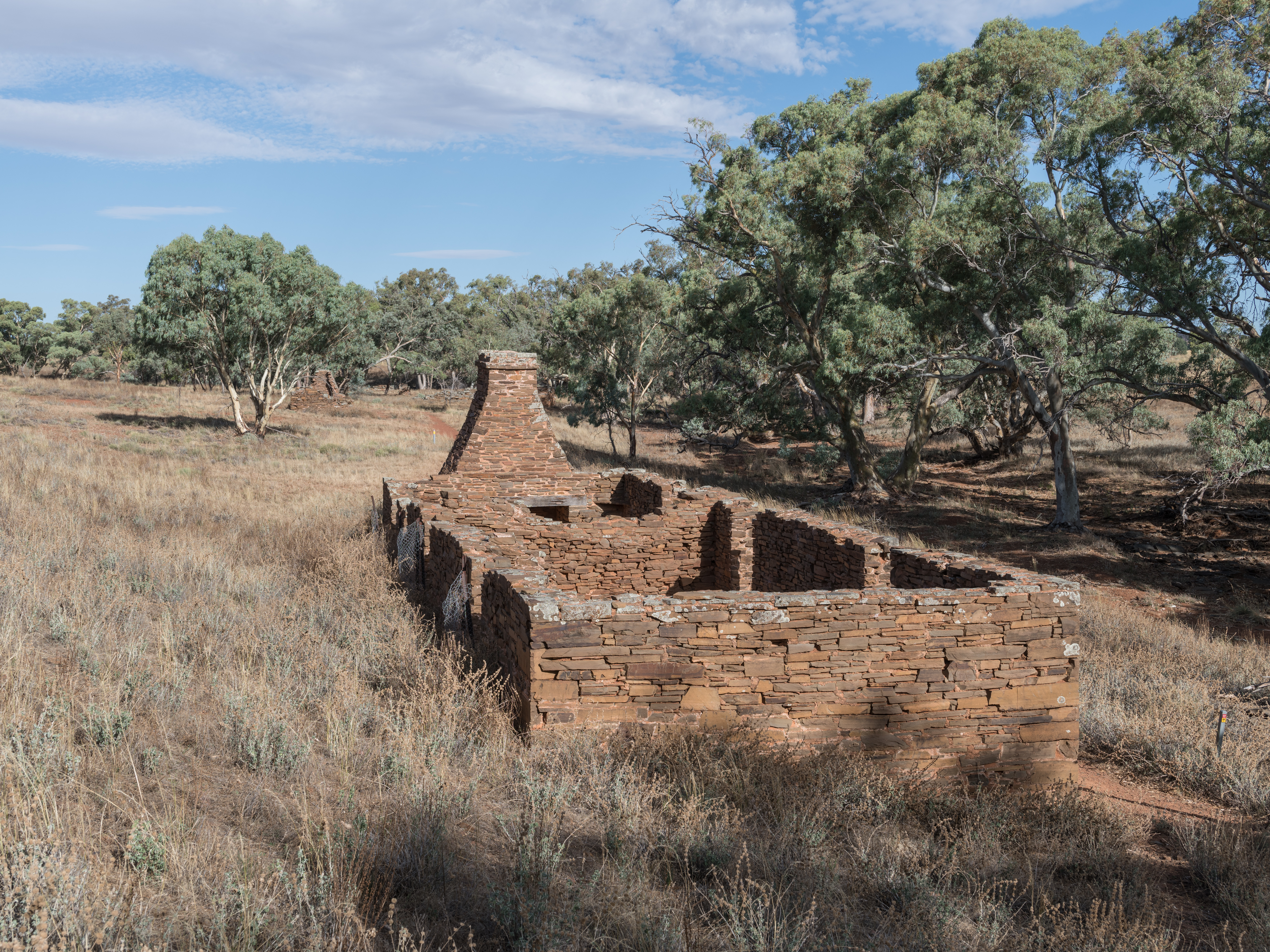
Appealinna Ruins

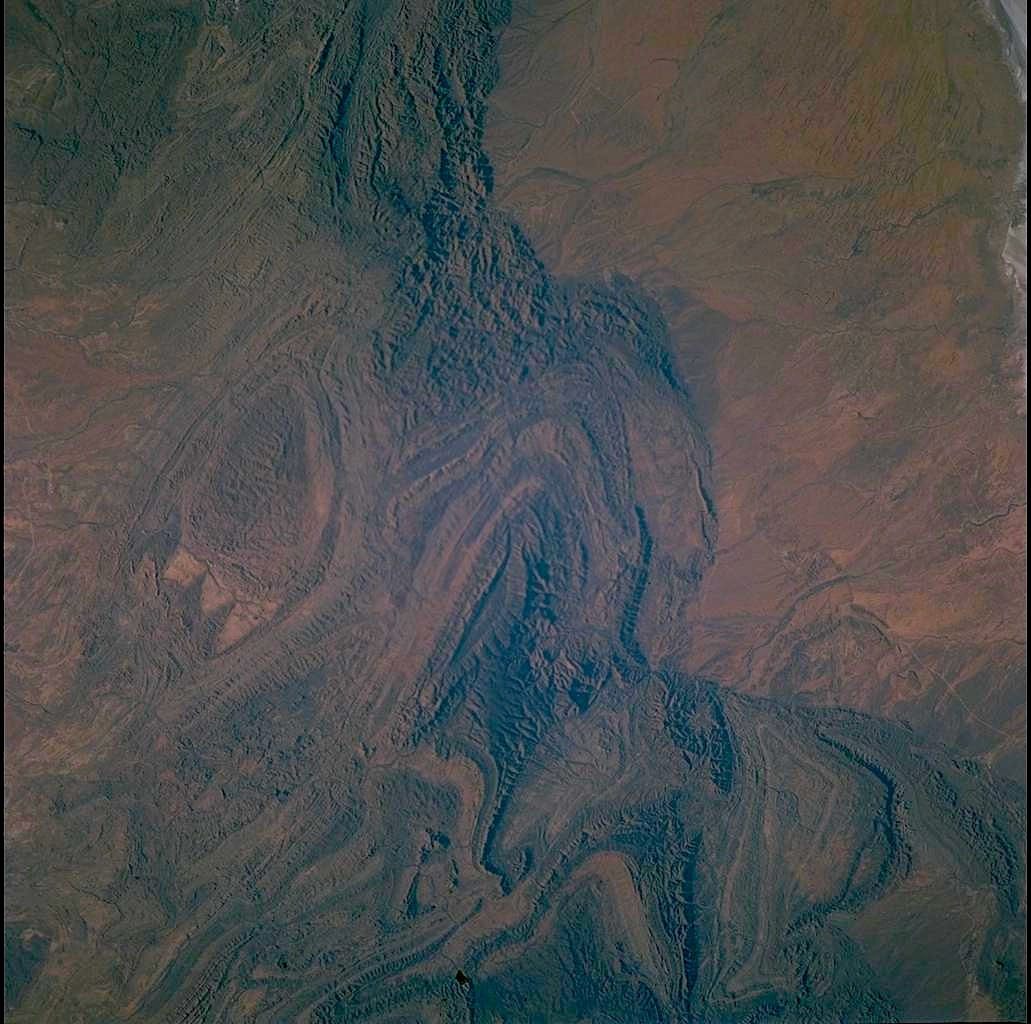
Flinders Ranges from space

For millennia, the Adnyamathanha people have inhabited the Flinders Ranges. On 12 February 2016 the park was renamed to include the Adnyamathanha word, Ikara, "meeting place", referring to the traditional name for Wilpena Pound.

== Features and accessibility ==
The park lies around 430 km (270 mi) north of Adelaide city centre, and covers 95,000 ha (370 mi^{2}), between Hawker and Blinman.

The park's most characteristic landmark is Wilpena Pound, a large, sickle-shaped, natural amphitheatre covering nearly 80 km^{2} (31 sq mi), containing the range's highest peak, St Mary Peak (1,170 metres (3,840 ft)). The Heysen Range is within the park. There are many lookouts, scenic vistas, small canyons, and unusual rock formations located in the park, including Brachina Gorge, Bunyeroo Gorge, Arkaroo Rock, Wilkawillina Gorge, and Hucks Lookout. The park has some stone ruins from early European settlement and Aboriginal rock art sites. A rock formation called the Great Wall of China is located just outside the park.

The park centre at Wilpena Pound is accessible by sealed road from Hawker. Other areas in the park can be reached by unsealed roads, which are mostly accessible by two-wheel drive vehicles except in bad weather or after heavy rain. Camping is permitted at many locations in the park.

The Heysen Trail (named for artist Hans Heysen) and Mawson Trail (named for geologist Sir Douglas Mawson) pass through the park.

The park is co-managed by the National Parks and Wildlife Service South Australia, which is part of the Department for Environment and Water, and the Adnyamathanha Traditional Lands Association (since 2011).

== Geology ==
The Flinders Ranges are largely composed of folded and faulted sediments of the Adelaide Geosyncline. This very thick sequence of sediments were deposited in a large basin during the Neoproterozoic on the passive margin of the ancient continent of Rodinia. During the Cambrian, approximately 540 million years ago, the area underwent the Delamerian orogeny where the geosynclinal sequence was folded and faulted into a large mountain range. Since this time the area has undergone erosion resulting in the relatively low ranges today.

Most of the high ground and ridgetops in the Flinders are sequences of quartzites that outcrop along strike. The high walls of Wilpena Pound are formed by the outcropping beds of the eponymous Pound Quartzite in a synclinal structure. The same formation forms many of the other high parts of the Flinders, including the high plateau of the Gammon Ranges and the Heysen Range. Cuesta forms are also very common in the Flinders.

== Paleontological significance ==
Ikara–Flinders Ranges National Park is part of the Flinders Ranges geological successions, where abundant and diverse arrays of fossils show how animal life began on Earth over a period of 350 million years.

=== IUGS geological heritage site ===
In respect of "the locality where well preserved Precambrian fossils of multicellular life were first found globally" the International Union of Geological Sciences (IUGS) included the "Ediacaran fossils in the Ediacara Hills, Flinders Ranges" in its assemblage of 100 geological heritage sites around the world in a listing published in October 2022. The organisation defines an IUGS Geological Heritage Site as "a key place with geological elements and/or processes of international scientific relevance, used as a reference, and/or with a substantial contribution to the development of geological sciences through history".

=== GSSP ===
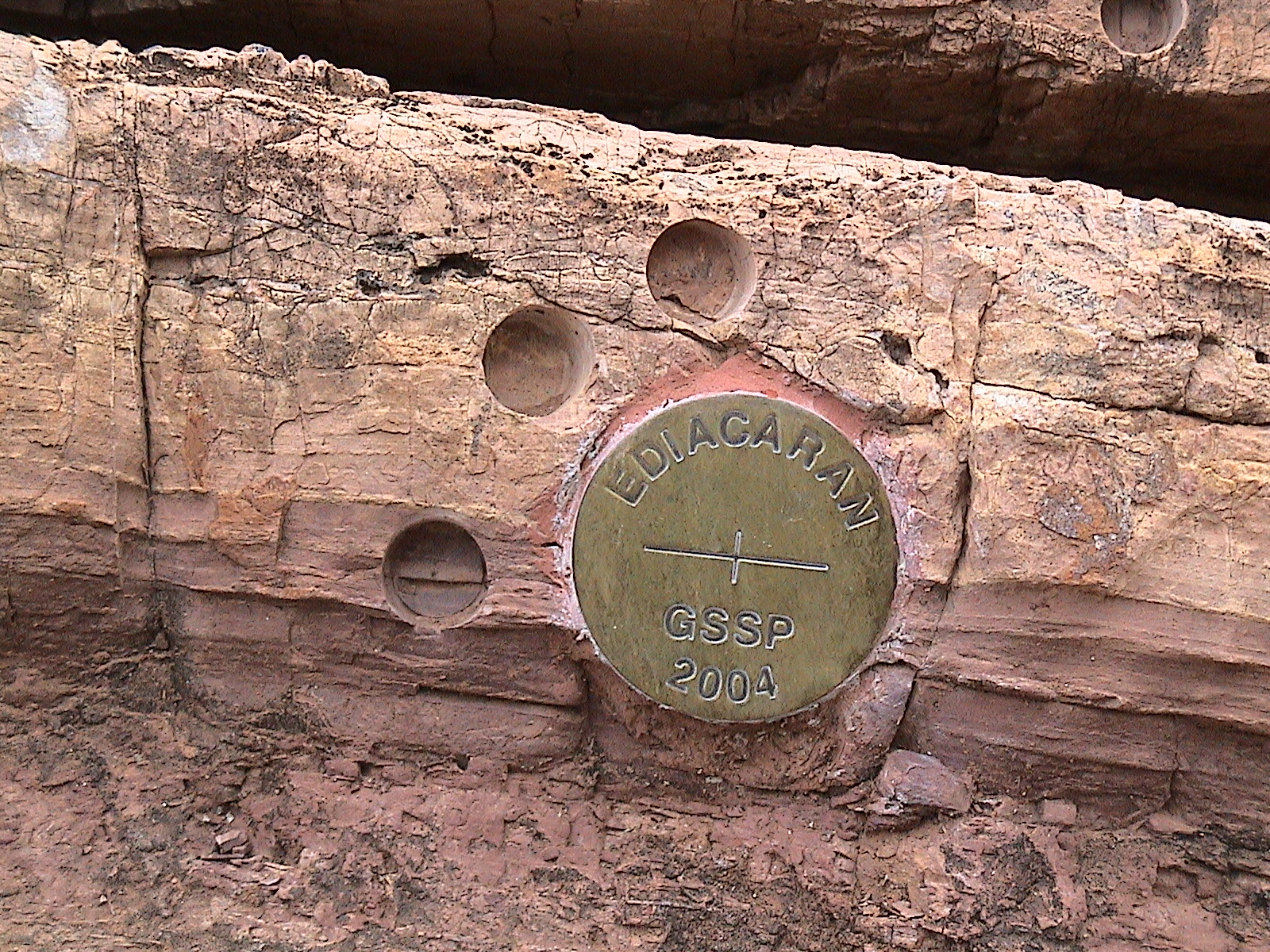
Ediacaran GSSP plaque at Enorama Creek

The area contains a Global Boundary Stratotype Section and Point (GSSP), also known as a "Golden Spike", as defined by International Union of Geological Sciences (IUGS) International Commission on Stratigraphy (ICS), and ratified by the ICS in 2004. The GSSP is a reference point on a stratigraphic section which defines the lower boundary of a stage on the geologic time scale, and is specifically located in Enorama Creek within the national park. It marks the lower boundary of the Ediacaran period, then recently recognised for the first time. (Note: Note that as of 14 August 2025, the IUGS publications incorrectly refer to the Golden Spike as being situated in the Edicara Hills. It is clear from its location (31° 19' 52 S 138° 38' 07 E) that it is within this park, as is Enorama Creek. I have sent a query for clarification. (Laterthanyouthink))

=== World Heritage bid ===
The park is one of a group of seven geographically separate areas that were submitted to the UNESCO World Heritage Centre for consideration as a World Heritage Site under criterion (viii) on 15 April 2021, and as of August 2025 remain on the "tentative" list. A 1947 study by Reg Sprigg and two 1949 studies by Sir Douglas Mawson are cited to support the application, which will be voted on in 2026. The complete bid for World Heritage listing was submitted to UNESCO Paris in March 2026.

== Flora and fauna ==
The flora of the Flinders Ranges is composed largely of species adapted to a semi-arid environment such as cypress-pine, mallee, and black oak. Moister areas near Wilpena Pound support grevilleas, Guinea flowers, lilies and ferns. Reeds and sedges grow near permanent water sources such as springs and waterholes.

Since the eradication of dingos and the establishment of permanent waterholes for stock, the numbers of red kangaroos, western grey kangaroos and euros in the Flinders Ranges have increased. The yellow-footed rock-wallaby, which neared extinction after the arrival of Europeans due to hunting and predation by foxes, has now stabilized. Other endemic marsupials include dunnarts, planigales. Efforts to reintroduce the western quoll and the brushtail possum in the park have been ongoing since 2014. Echidnas are the sole monotreme species in the park. Insectivorous bats make up significant proportion of mammals in the area. Reptiles include goannas, snakes, dragon lizards, skinks and geckos. The streambank froglet is an endemic amphibian.

=== Birds ===
There are a large number of bird species including various parrots, emus, the wedge-tailed eagles and small numbers of waterbirds. The land within the national park has been identified by BirdLife International as an Important Bird Area (IBA) because it contains an apparently sustainable population of the range-restricted short-tailed grasswren.

== Heritage listings ==
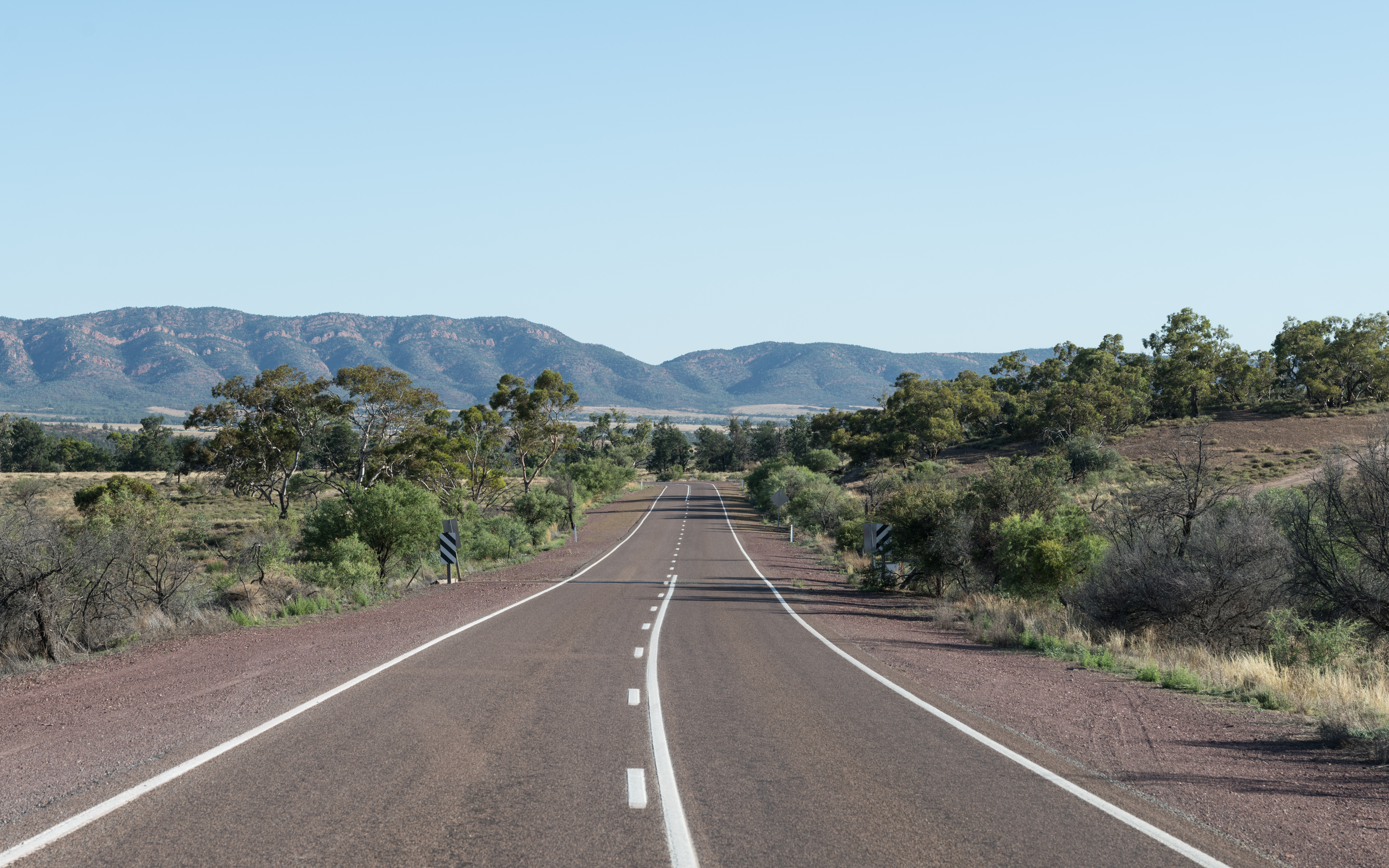
Flinders Ranges Way, the main road crossing the park

There are a number of state-heritage-listed sites within the national park, listed on the South Australian Heritage Register:

- Eddie Pumpa Outstation
- Hayward Homestead Ruins
- Impact Ejecta Horizon Late Precambrian Shales Geological Site
- Enorama Mail Station and Rubbish Dump
- Oraparinna Diapir
- Wilpena Homestead Complex
- Wilpena Pound (geological landform)
- Stromatolites in the Precambrian Trezona Formation, Enorama Creek
- Wills Homestead Complex Ruins
- Appealinna Mine Ruins and Miners Hut
- Wilkawillina Archaeocyathae Geological Site
- Dingley Dell Homestead Ruins
- Hill's Cottage, Wilpena Pound
- Enorama Diapir
- Oraparinna Station Blacksmith's Shop

== See also ==
- Arkaroola, a wildlife sanctuary
- Arkaroola Protection Area, a protected area containing valuable fossil sites
- Cazneaux Tree, an historic tree near Wilpena Pound
- Mawson Plateau
- Mount Chambers Gorge
- Protected areas of South Australia
- Wapma Thura–Southern Flinders Ranges National Park
- Vulkathunha-Gammon Ranges National Park
