= Flinders Ranges =

Mountain range in South Australia

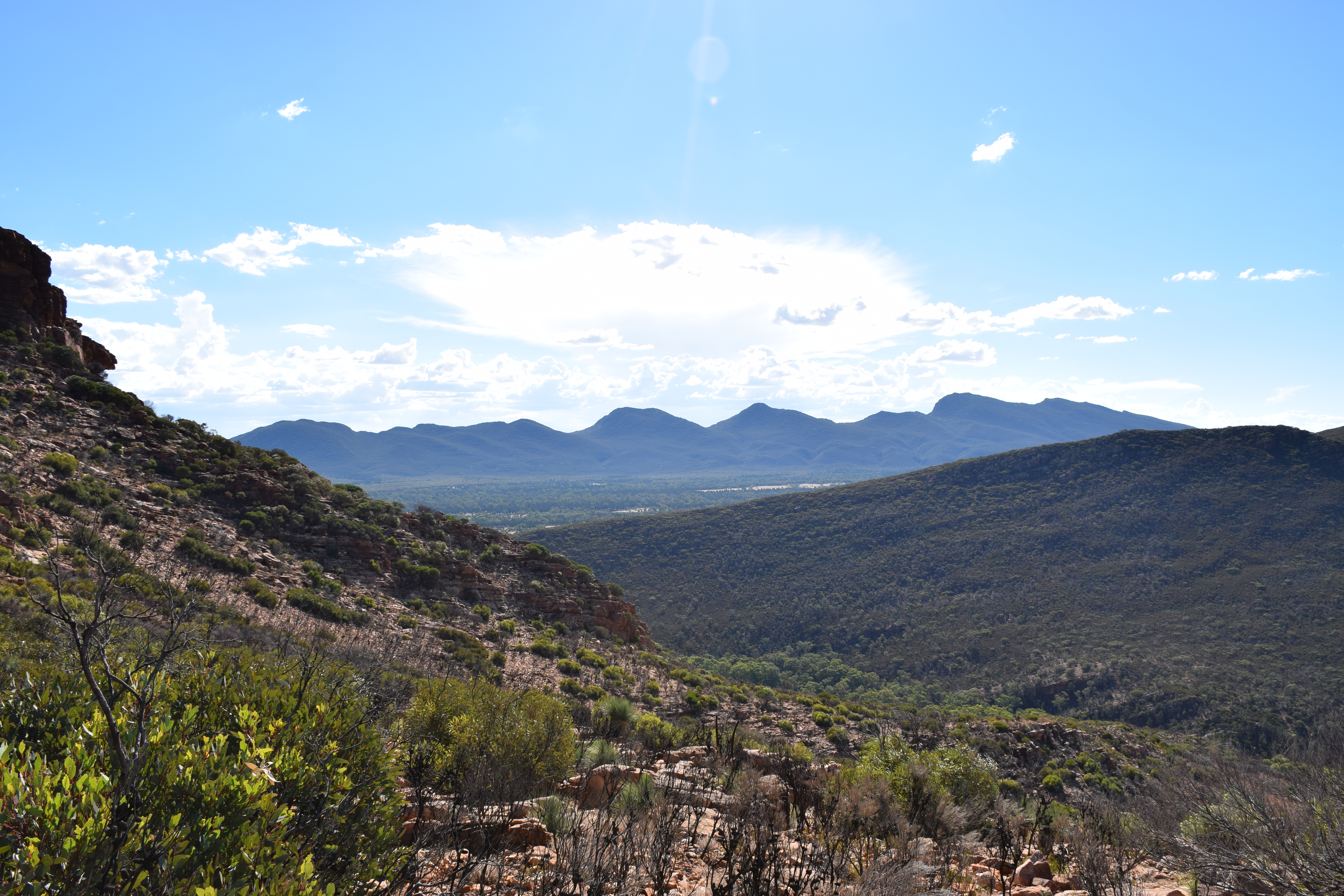
- The Flinders Ranges

Highest point
- Peak: St Mary Peak
- Elevation: 1,171 m (3,842 ft)

Dimensions
- Length: 430 km (265 mi) north/south

Geography
- Location within South Australia
- Country: Australia
- State: South Australia
- Range coordinates: 30°55′S 138°37′E

The Flinders Ranges are the largest mountain ranges in South Australia, which starts about 200 km (125 mi) north of Adelaide. The ranges stretch for over 430 km (265 mi) from Port Pirie to Lake Callabonna.

The Adnyamathanha people are the Aboriginal group who have inhabited the range for tens of thousands of years.

Its most well-known landmark is Wilpena Pound / Ikara, a formation that creates a natural amphitheatre covering 80 km^{2} (31 sq mi) and containing the range's highest peak, St Mary Peak (1,171 m (3,842 ft)). The ranges include several national parks, the largest being the Ikara-Flinders Ranges National Park, as well as other protected areas.

It is an area of great geological and palaeontological significance, and includes the oldest fossil evidence of animal life discovered. It presents a major stage of Earth’s history, a complete record in rock layers of "the dawn of animal life". The Ediacaran Period and Ediacaran biota take their name from the Ediacara Hills within the ranges. In April 2021, a nomination for seven sites in the Flinders Ranges to be named a World Heritage Site was lodged. as of August 2025 it remains on the tentative list, due to be voted on in 2026.

== History ==
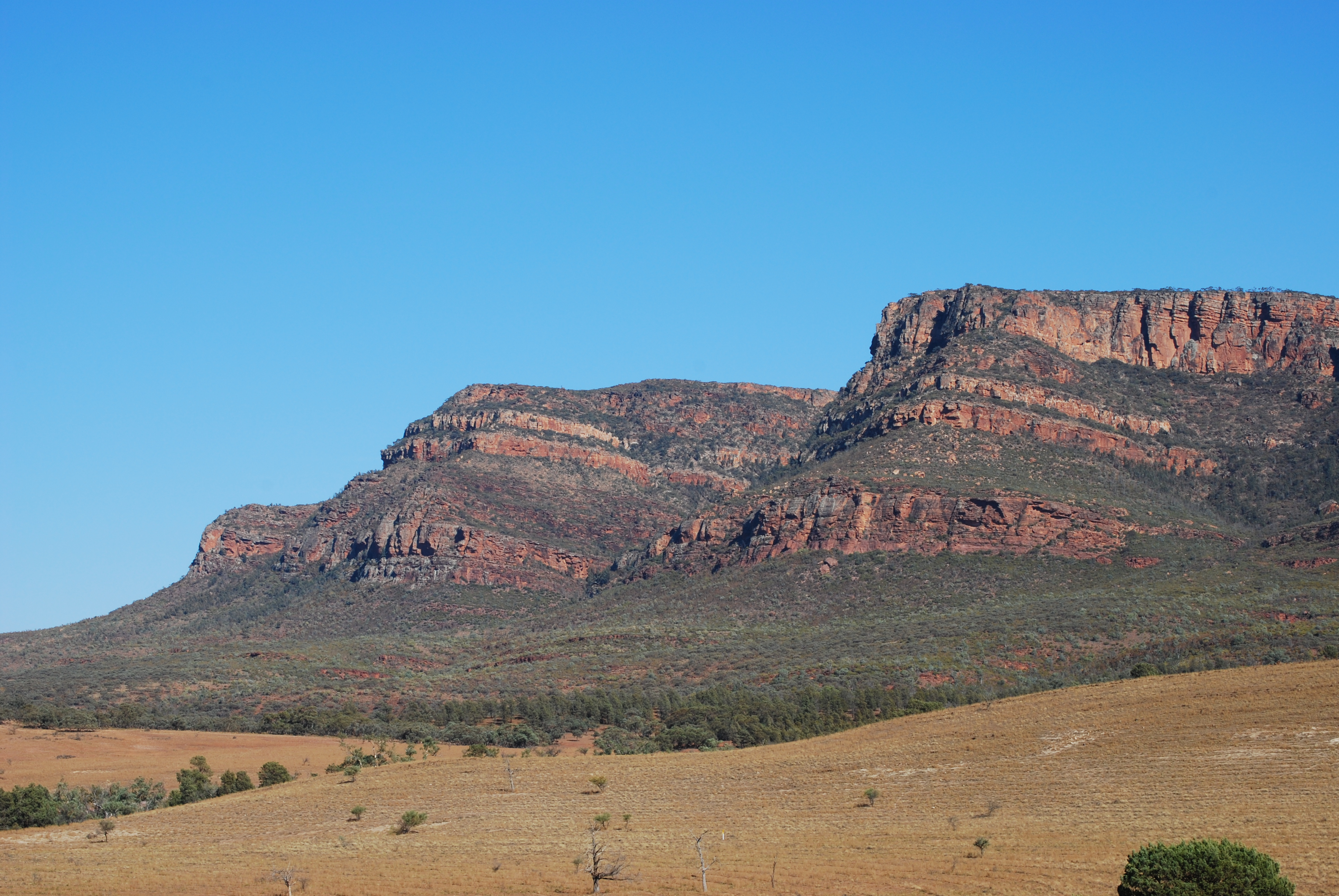
The Flinders Ranges at the southern end of Wilpena Pound

=== Traditional owners ===
The first humans to inhabit the Flinders Ranges were the Adnyamathanha people (meaning "hill people" or "rock people") whose descendants still reside in the area, and the Ngadjuri (Ndajurri) people, They inhabited the range for tens of thousands of years before being dispersed by European settlement after colonisation. Cave paintings, rock engravings and other cultural artefacts indicate that the Adnyamathana and Ndajurri lived in the Flinders Ranges for tens of thousands of years. Occupation of the Warratyi rock shelter dates back approximately 49,000 years.

=== 19th century: European explorers and settlement ===
The first European explorers were an exploration party from Matthew Flinders' seagoing visit to upper Spencer Gulf aboard HMS Investigator. They climbed Mount Brown in March 1802. In the winter of 1839 Edward John Eyre, with five men, two drays and ten horses, further explored the region, setting out from Adelaide on 1 May. The party set up a depot near Mount Arden, and then explored the surrounding region and upper Spencer Gulf, before heading east to the Murray River and returning to Adelaide.

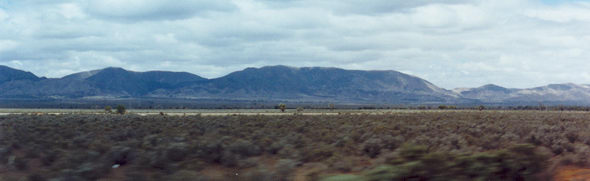
The Flinders Ranges as seen from the Stuart Highway

There are records of squatters in the Quorn district as early as 1845; however, the first three pastoral leases in the central Flinders Ranges were only marked out in 1851. These were Wilpena, Arkaba, and Aroona, which were developed as sheep stations. The leases were initially granted for 14 years by the government of the Colony of South Australia, over land dubbed "unoccupied waste lands".

==== Aroona and the Brachina Gorge massacre (1852) ====
The name Aroona is derived from an Adnyamathanha word meaning "running water", or "place of frogs". Aroona Valley is a long open valley that lies around 25 km (16 mi) north of Wilpena Pound, between the Heysen Range and ABC Ranges. The lease was taken up first by the Brownes, and then by Johnson Frederick Hayward in the 1850s. Hayward had arrived in 1847 from Somerset, and was initially overseer of Pekina Station. Hayward Bluff, False Mount Hayward, South Mount Hayward, and Mount Hayward, in the Heysen Range, are all named after him. The Aroona head station was built next to a waterhole used by local Adnyamathanha people for its permanent supply of fresh water, but the Aboriginal people were not welcome on the station during Hayward's time there. He was implicated in a massacre of Aboriginal people near Brachina Gorge. At least 15 men, women, and children were killed in a dawn attack on 17 March 1852, in retaliation for the murder of stockman Robert Richardson on 14 March. Hayward said that he was obliged to defend his men, due to the absence of police, and that he was attempting to "capture the murderers", firing at them in "self-defence". Sergeant Major Rose, who was in the district at the time with the Protector of Aborigines, Matthew Moorhouse, arrested two Aboriginal men called Bill and Jemmy, but they were released after being held for some time owing to lack of evidence and problems finding an interpreter. In the early 1860s Hayward returned to England, and purchased an estate near Bath, which he called Aroona.

==== Later settlement ====
In 1852 Kanyaka Station was established by Hugh Proby.

William Pinkerton is credited as being the first European to find a route through the Flinders Ranges via Pichi Richi Pass. In 1853 he drove 7,000 sheep along the eastern plains of the range, to where Quorn would be built 25 years later (Pinkerton Creek runs through the Quorn township).

During the late 1870s the push to open agricultural land for wheat north of the Goyder's Line had met with unusual success, with good rainfall and crops in the Flinders Ranges. This, along with the copper mining lobby (copper was mined in the Hawker-Flinders Ranges area in the late 1850s and transported overland by bullock dray), induced the government to build a narrow gauge railway line north of Port Augusta through Pichi Richi Pass, Quorn, Hawker and along the west of the ranges to Marree, to service the agricultural and pastoral industries.

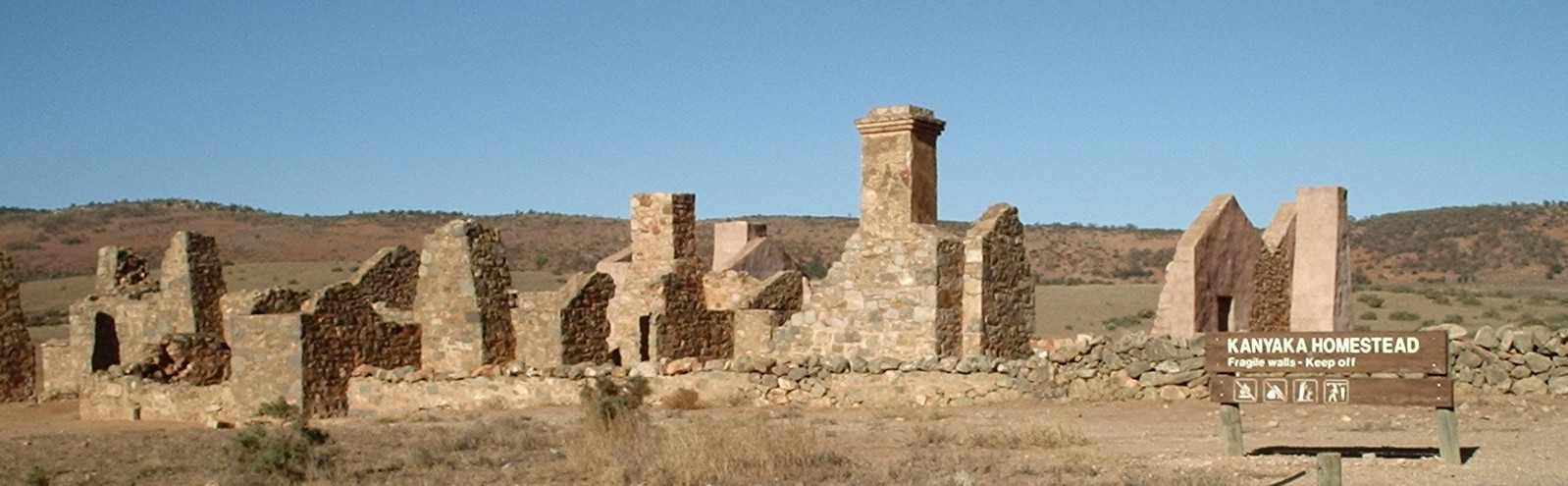
Abandoned Kanyaka Station homestead between Quorn and Hawker

However, rainfall returned to a normal pattern for the region, causing many agricultural farms to collapse. Remnants of abandoned homes can still be seen dotted around the arid landscape. Wilpena station, due to its unusual geography, along with areas around Quorn and Carrieton, are now the only places north of Goyder's Line to sustain any crops. Wilpena has now been left to the wild and is only a tourist location. As of 2009, kukri, unpopular with most Australian farmers as it yields 10–15% less grain than other varieties of wheat, is being grown for export to India.

Mining exploration continued in the region, but coal mining at Leigh Creek and barytes at Oraparinna were the only long-term successes. Pastoral industries flourished, and the rail line became of major importance in opening up and servicing sheep and cattle stations along the route to Alice Springs.

Hawker townsite was surveyed at a bend in the railway line where the train line left the main road to Blinman, and named in 1880 after South Australian politician and pastoralist George Charles Hawker.

Quorn was surveyed by Godfrey Walsh and proclaimed a town on 16 May 1878. The township covered an area of 1.72 km^{2} (0.66 sq mi) and was laid out in squares in a manner similar to the state's capital city, Adelaide. Governor Jervois reputedly bestowed the name 'Quorn' because his private secretary at the time had come from the parish of Quorn, Leicestershire in England.

=== 20th century ===
In the 1920s Aroona became an outstation of Oraparinna Station, and spring water was used to irrigate large gardens there.

== Features and attractions ==
The Flinders Ranges are the largest mountain range in South Australia. It starts about 200 km (125 mi) north of Adelaide city centre. The discontinuous ranges stretch for over 430 km (265 mi) from Port Pirie to Lake Callabonna.

Its most characteristic landmark is Wilpena Pound / Ikara, a large, sickle-shaped, natural amphitheatre that covers 80 km^{2} (31 sq mi), and contains the range's highest peak, St Mary Peak (1,171 m (3,842 ft),) which adjoins the Ikara-Flinders Ranges National Park.

The southern ranges are notable for the Pichi Richi heritage steam and diesel railway and Mount Remarkable National Park.

The Heysen Trail (named for artist Hans Heysen) and Mawson Trail (named for geologist and Antarctic explorer Sir Douglas Mawson) runs for several hundred kilometres along the ranges, providing scenic long distance routes for walkers, cyclists and horse-riders.

=== Protected areas ===
Several small areas in the ranges have the protected area status. These include the Ikara-Flinders Ranges National Park near Wilpena Pound/Ikara, the Mount Remarkable National Park in the south near Melrose, the Arkaroola Protection Area in the north, The Dutchmans Stern Conservation Park west of Quorn, and the Mount Brown Conservation Park south of Quorn.

== Geology ==
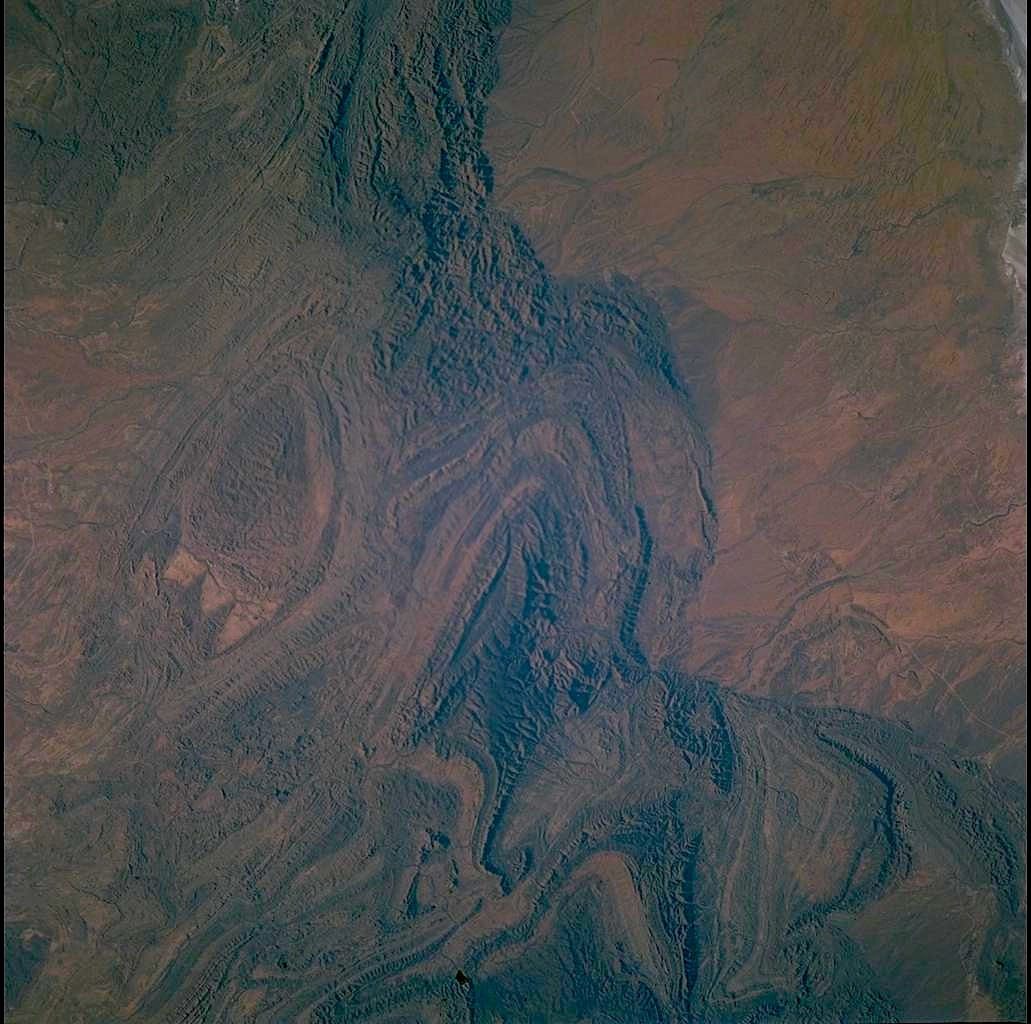
Flinders Ranges from space

The Flinders Ranges are composed largely of folded and faulted sediments of the Adelaide Geosyncline. This very thick sequence was deposited in a large basin during the Neoproterozoic on the passive margin of the ancient continent of Rodinia. During the Cambrian (about 540 million years ago) the area underwent the Delamerian orogeny, when this sequence of rocks was folded and faulted into a large mountain range. The area has undergone subsequent erosion resulting in the relatively low ranges today.

Most of the high ground and ridgetops are sequences of quartzites that outcrop along strike. The high walls of Wilpena Pound are formed by the outcropping beds of the eponymous Pound Quartzite in a synclinal structure. Synclines form other high parts of the Flinders, including the plateau of the Gammon Ranges and the Heysen Range. Cuesta forms are also very common.

The Ranges are renowned for the Ediacara Hills, south-west of Leigh Creek, where in 1946 some of the oldest fossil evidence of animal life was discovered. Similar fossils have subsequently been found in the ranges, including at Nilpena, with an application being made for World Heritage listing to help protect the sites. In 2004 a new geological period, the Ediacaran Period, was created to mark the appearance of Ediacaran biota.

== Climate ==
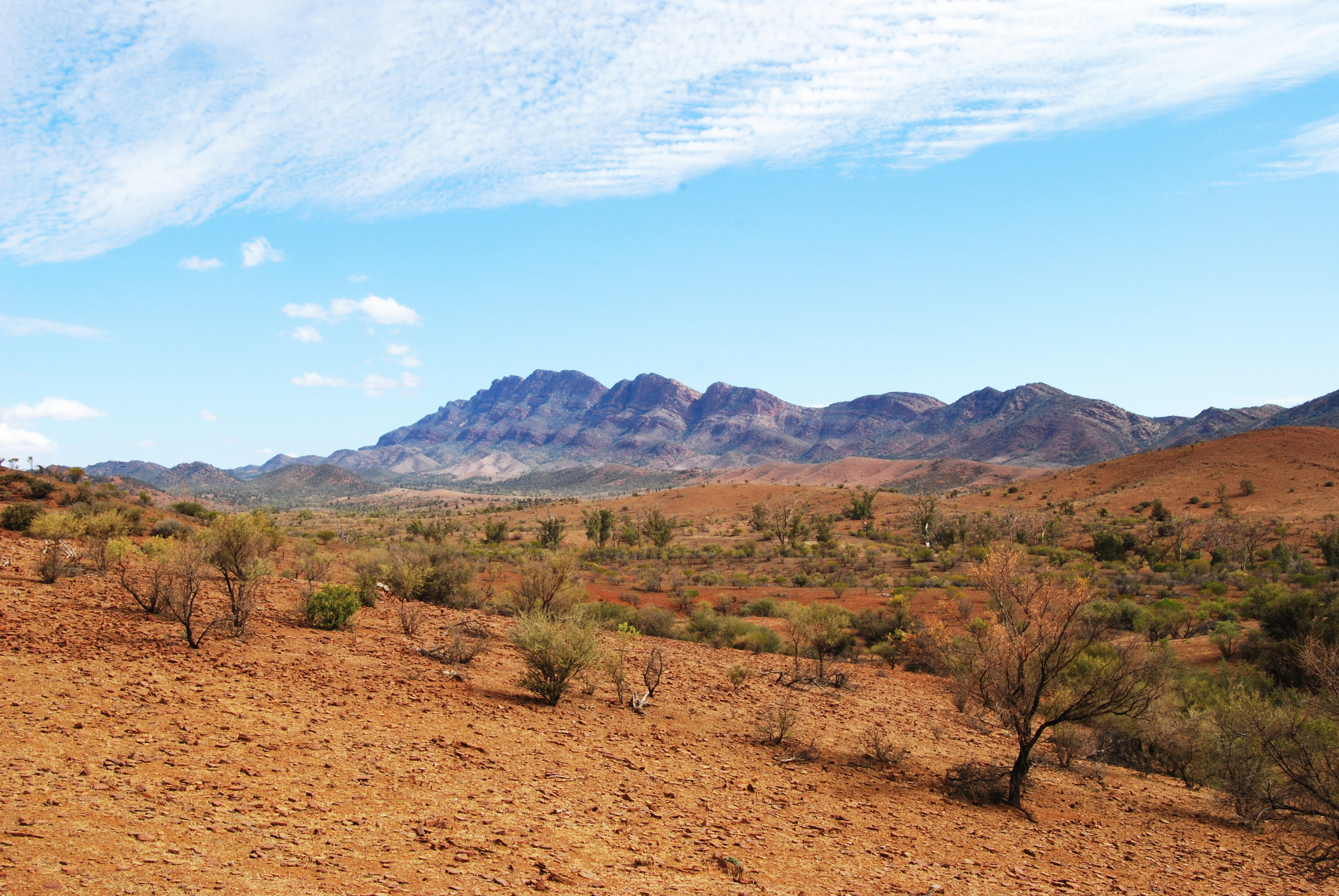
Arid land in the Flinders Ranges

The region has a semi-arid climate with hot dry summers and cool winters. Summer temperatures usually exceed 38 °C (100 °F), while winters have highs around 13–16 °C (55–61 °F), depending on the elevation. Although rainfall is erratic, most of the precipitation falls in winter. There are also some monsoonal showers and storms that move in from the north during the summer. The area gets around 250 mm (9.8 in) of rain annually, with the highest at Wilpena Pound, at 350 mm (14 in). Frost is common on winter mornings and temperatures have dropped as low as −8 °C (18 °F). Snow has even been recorded in the Wilpena Pound and at Blinman. As of 2013, the last significant snowfall was in 1995.

== Flora and fauna ==
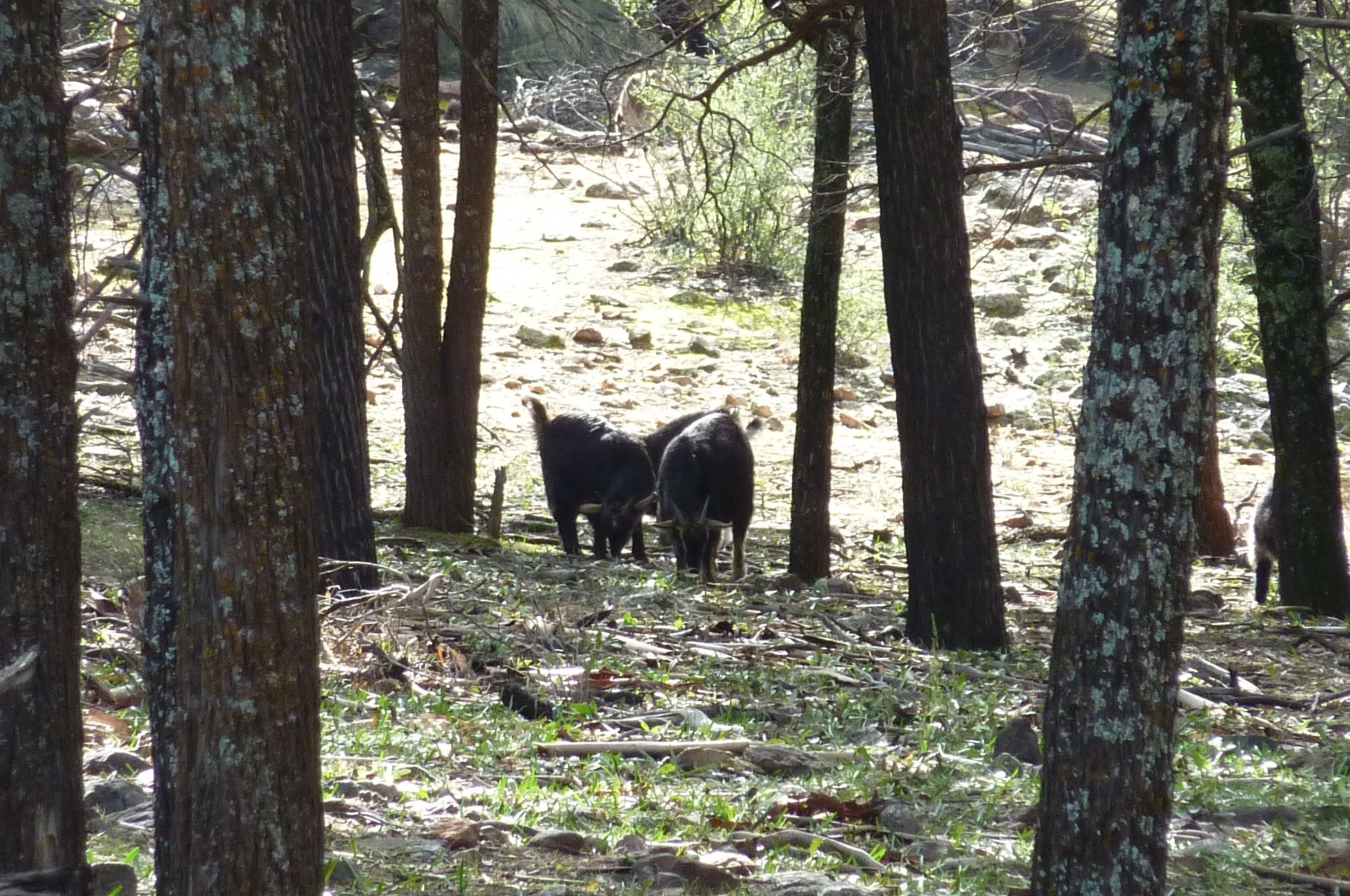
Feral goats were first introduced into the Flinders Ranges in the 1840s, and grew to become a problem after the eradication of dingos in the 1940s

The flora of the Ranges are largely species adapted to a semi-arid environment, including sugar gum, cypress-pine, mallee and black oak. Moister areas near Wilpena Pound support grevilleas, Guinea flowers, Liliaceae and ferns. Reeds and sedges grow near permanent water sources such as springs and waterholes.

Since the eradication of dingos and the establishment of permanent waterholes for stock, the number of red kangaroos, western grey kangaroos and wallaroos in the Flinders Ranges has increased. The yellow-footed rock-wallaby, which neared extinction after the arrival of Europeans due to hunting and predation by foxes and feral cats, has now stabilised. Other endemic marsupials include dunnarts and planigales. Feral goats are common in the region as well, although are not native to it. Insectivorous bats make up a significant proportion of the mammals. There are a large number of bird species including parrots, galahs, emus, the wedge-tailed eagle and small numbers of water birds. Reptiles include goannas, snakes, dragon lizards, skinks and geckos. The streambank froglet is an endemic amphibian.

The Ranges are part of the Tirari–Sturt stony desert ecoregion.

== World Heritage bid ==
A team acting on behalf of the Government of South Australia and the traditional owners, the Adnyamathanha people, which includes internationally-renowned American palaeontologist Mary L. Droser, lodged a nomination for a tentative listing as a World Heritage Site, which was accepted by UNESCO in April 2021.

The application was made on the basis of its unique geological and palaeontological values.

The involvement of the Adnyamathanha people, particularly their caring for country and sharing knowledge of their cultural heritage, is an important part of the future management of a World Heritage site. In November 2022, the state government announced an allocation of A$500,000 over four years towards enabling the Adnyamathanha people to identify priorities for cultural heritage protection. One example is the rock engravings that are understood to be the oldest artwork in the world, some dating back 40,000 years. Elder Vince Coulthard has been involved in the application process, and says that the creation stories also need to be included.

Seven geographically separate properties in the Flinders have been identified as possessing the technical and scientific evidence necessary to support the bid:

- Arkaroola Protection Area
- Vulkathunha-Gammon Ranges National Park
- Ikara-Flinders Ranges National Park
- Nilpena Ediacara National Park (formerly a pastoral lease and conservation park)
- Maynards Well (pastoral lease)
- Angorichina (pastoral lease)
- Ajax Mine Fossil Reef (on Puttapa (pastoral lease))

As of August 2025 the application remains on the tentative list, and is due to be voted on in 2026.

== See also ==
- Beverley Uranium Mine
- Edeowie glass
- Ediacara (disambiguation)
- Mawson Plateau
- Mount Chambers Gorge
- Protected areas of South Australia
- Mount Remarkable
- Panaramitee Style
