= Warratyi =

Rock shelter and archaeological site in Australia

Coordinates: 30.5921°S 138.9592°E

Warratyi, located within South Australia

Warratyi is the site of a rock shelter in the Flinders Ranges in South Australia. Located around 550 kilometres (340 mi) north of Adelaide and about 200 kilometres (120 mi) inland, it has been identified as the oldest known site of human habitation in inland Australia. Newspapers reported that this rock shelter was discovered by chance in 2011 by a local resident who stumbled upon it while looking for somewhere to go to the toilet. Researchers found thousands of artefacts and bone fragments, which enabled them to date the shelter's occupation to a number of periods between 49,000 and 10,000 years ago. The finds include the earliest evidence in Australia of the development of bone and stone-axe technology, the use of ochre, and interaction with megafauna such as Diprotodon.

== Discovery ==
The site is located in the ancestral lands of the Adnyamathanha, an Indigenous Australian people. It lies in a gorge at the southern end of the Lake Eyre basin in the northern Flinders Ranges. Its discovery came about by chance during an exploratory trip into the Flinders Range by Clifford Coulthard, an Adnyamathanha elder, and Giles Hamm, an archaeologist from La Trobe University.

While Coulthard was searching for a place to go to the toilet, the two men found a spring surrounded by rock art and a soot-blackened fissure in the rock nearby. They realised immediately that the soot indicated that the fissure had been used as a shelter where fires had been lit. The fissure is located about 20 metres (66 ft) above a creek bed. It is approximately 10 metres (33 ft) wide and extends to a depth of about 4 metres (13 ft).

== Finds ==
Between 2011 and 2014, a team of researchers led by Hamm excavated the shelter to a depth of 1 metre (3.3 ft). They found over 4,300 artefacts including bone fragments from sixteen species of mammal and one reptile, as well as eggs from emus and an extinct giant bird, Genyornis newtoni. The animal remains included bones from the extinct Diprotodon, a wombat-like creature the size of a rhinoceros, which had probably been killed and brought to the shelter to be cooked and eaten. Most of the 3 kilograms (6.6 lb) of bones discovered were probably from a single species, the yellow-footed rock-wallaby.

The artefacts included pieces of gypsum pigment, hafted and stone tools, and bone needles including the oldest bone tool so far found in Australia. The shelter also provided evidence of the earliest known ochre usage in Australia and south-east Asia. Fragments of fibrous plant material found at the site may be the remains of nets, which the occupants may have used to catch the fast-moving wallabies.

== Analysis ==
Dating was carried out through a combination of stratigraphy (analysing the depth of artefacts), carbon dating of organic artefacts and the use of single-grain optically stimulated luminescence to date quartz grains. This revealed that the shelter had been used in a number of phases over tens of thousands of years, with the earliest evidence of habitation 49,000 years ago. It appears to have been used particularly intensively about 40,000 years ago, but usage declined around 35,000–24,000 years ago during a period of extreme aridity in South Australia. Another relatively intensive period of usage occurred from around 17,000 years ago, with the last evidence of usage dating to around 10,000 years before the present day.

The discoveries have shed new light on the human colonisation of Australia by the ancestors of today's Indigenous Australians. The first Australians are thought to have migrated by boat to northern Australia about 50,000 years ago. They then spread all the way around the coasts of the continent within possibly as little as 2,000 years. It had previously been thought that they took much longer to diffuse into Australia's arid interior, as the next earliest known evidence of interior settlement, at Puritjarra in western central Australia, is dated to 11,000 years after the oldest of the Warratyi finds. However, the discoveries at Warratyi suggest that the interior diffusion happened much earlier than that. It is possible that humans migrated into the interior at a very early date by following river systems and settled around inland springs such as the one at Warratyi. Alternatively, they may have cut directly through the centre of the country.
