= Mount Chambers Gorge =

Gorge in Australia

Mount Chambers Gorge Marlawadinha Inbiri
- Gorge
- South-eastern end of chasm

- Location in South Australia Mount Chambers Gorge (Australia)
- Coordinates: 30°58′16″S 139°16′50″E
- Location: Wertaloona, South Australia, Australia

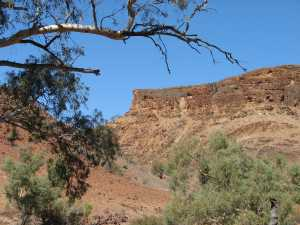
Eastern end of Mount Chambers The chasm is toward the left end of the upper part of the mountain and is too small to be visible in this photo.

Mount Chambers Gorge, also known as Chambers Gorge (alternative name: Marlawadinha Inbiri) is a gorge in the Flinders Ranges, in the Australian state of South Australia, about 60 kilometres (37 mi) north-east of Blinman. It is part of Mount Chambers.

== History ==
Aboriginal people of the Adnyamathanha group inhabited the area before the British colonisation of South Australia, and there are petroglyphs created by them at the gorge.

Chambers Mount and Chambers Gorge were named for the John and James Chambers, who were early settlers and pastoralists in the colony of South Australia. Captain Edward C. Frome and his party came across them in 1843, and they were given their English names by Scottish explorer and surveyor John McDouall Stuart in 1855.

John Chambers held many of the leases in the area until 1863, when he sold them to Philip Levi.

== Location and description ==
Mount Chambers and Chambers Gorge are in the locality of Wertaloona about 60 kilometres (37 mi) north-east of Blinman in the Flinders Ranges, near the road between Blinman and Balcanoona, in the Vulkathunha-Gammon Ranges National Park. They are part of the Wearing Hills.

Mount Chambers is 409 m (1,342 ft) high. The gorge winds through the Wearing Hills toward Lake Frome.

The name Adnyamathanha name for Chambers Gorge is Marlawadinha Inbiri, and it is a significant ancient cultural site for Adnyamathanha people.

== Rock art ==
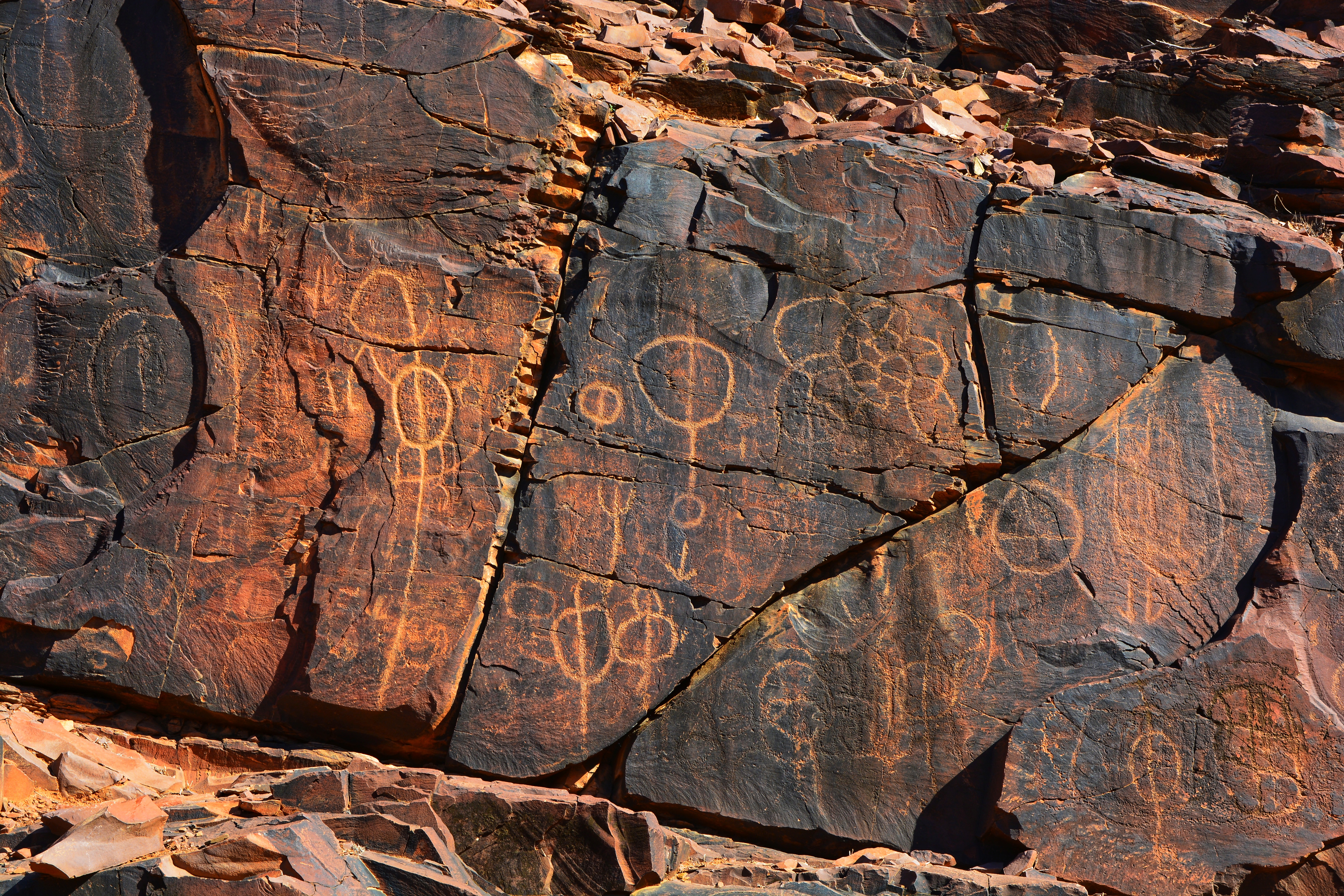
Ancient Aboriginal symbols, Chambers Gorge, South Australia (49664870858)

Chambers Gorge is a significant and extensive Aboriginal rock art site, with around 200 motifs on the walls of the gorge, both engraved and painted. A large sign at the gorge explains the significance to the Adnyamathanha people.

Tours of the gorge with Aboriginal guides are available.

== Facilities ==
There is free camping at the gorge, which is only accessible by 4WD.

== Mount Chambers Chasm ==
The upper part of Mount Chambers is composed of a limestone that is resistant to erosion. The resistance of the limestone and the greater erodibility of the underlying rock has resulted in the upper part of the mesa being mostly surrounded by precipitous walls.

The chasm extends about 50 m (160 ft) across the width of the Mount Chambers mesa near its eastern end. The top of the chasm is about three metres wide at the south-eastern end and two metres at the north-western end.
