= Wilpena Pound =

Mountains north of Adelaide, South Australia

Wilpena Pound / Ikara
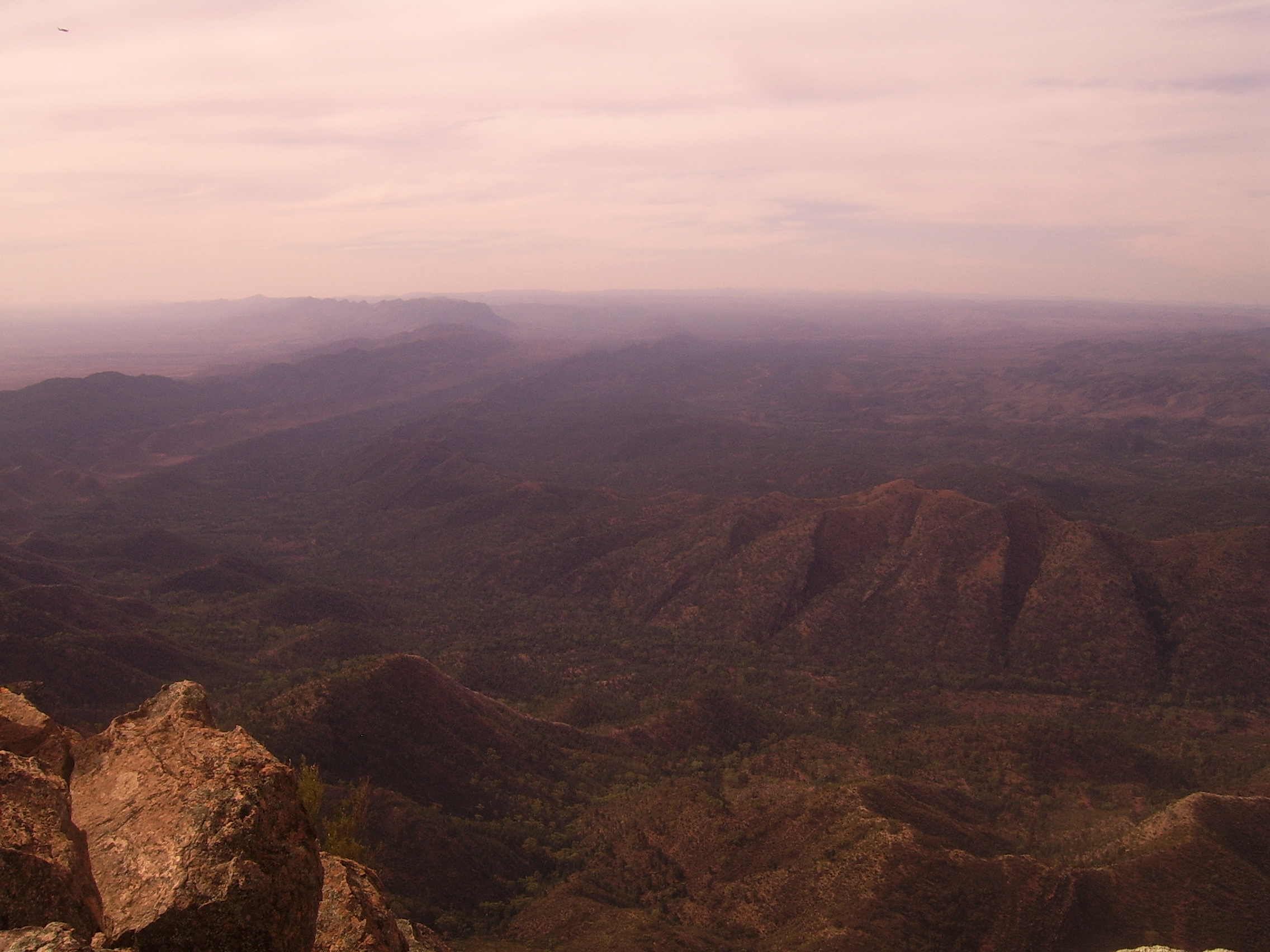
- Wilpena Pound viewed from Ngarri Mudlanha

Highest point
- Peak: St Mary Peak
- Elevation: 1,171 m (3,842 ft)
- Coordinates: 31°33′32″S 138°34′26″E

Geography
- Location within South Australia Location within Australia
- Location: South Australia, Australia
- Parent range: Flinders Ranges

Wilpena Pound ("Ikara" in the Adnyamathanha language) is a major natural amphitheatre of mountains located 429 kilometres (267 mi) north of Adelaide, South Australia, Australia in the heart of the Ikara-Flinders Ranges National Park. Its fringe is accessible by a sealed road between the towns of Hawker to the south and Blinman in the northern Flinders Ranges.

It was used for grazing from the mid-nineteenth century to the mid-twentieth century and for cropping in the early twentieth century. Its tourism potential was recognised in 1949.

== Geomorphology ==
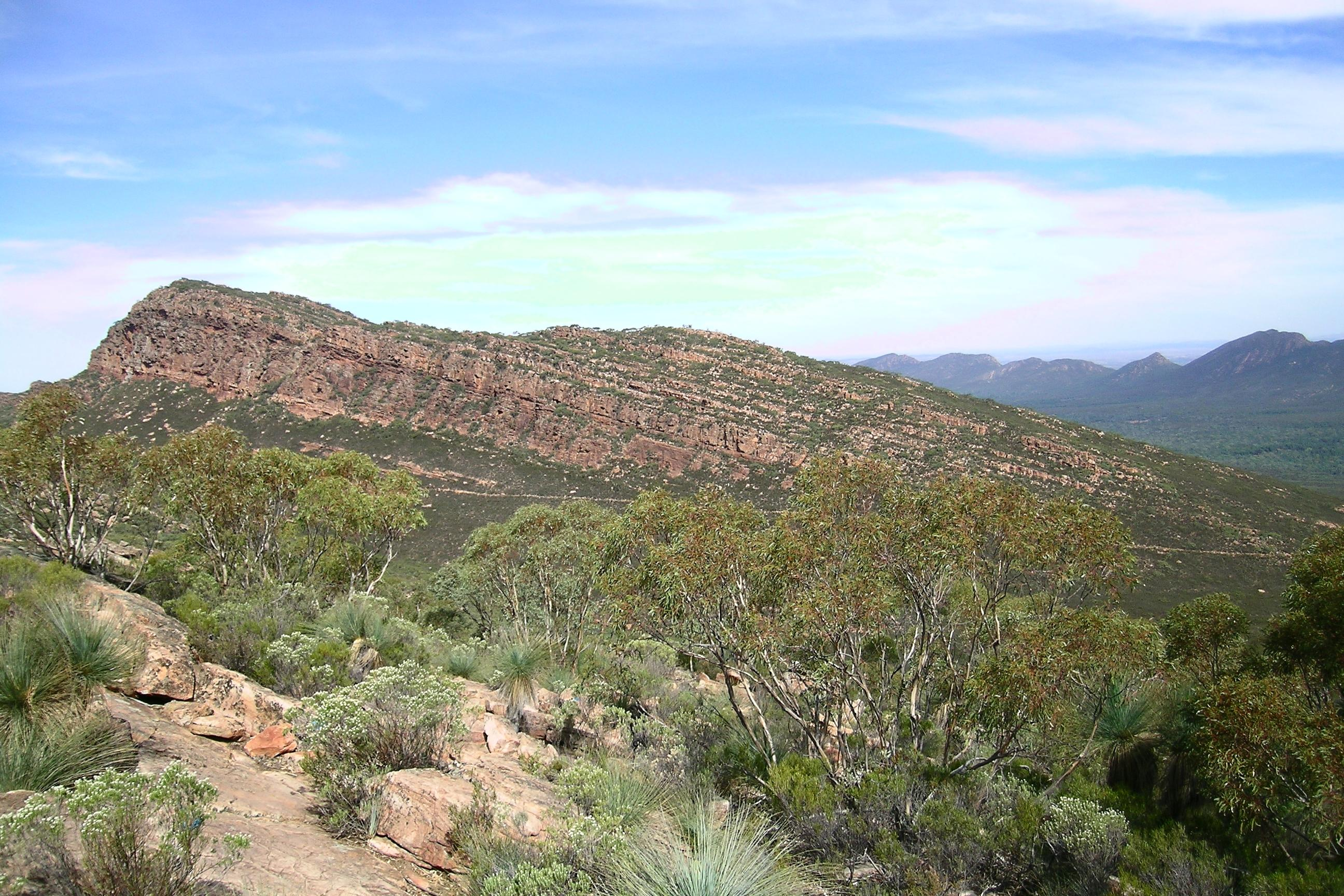
A mountain in Wilpena Pound showing characteristic layered syncline

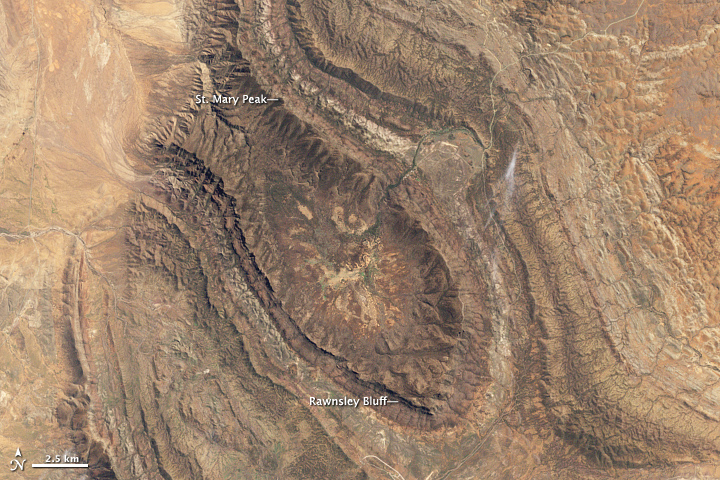
Annotated view of Wilpena from space

The area is part of the Adelaide Geosyncline. Early amateur theories mistakenly suggested Wilpena Pound was an ancient volcano. The Pound is a synclinal basin with the fold axis running NNW-SSE through Edeowie Gorge at the northern end and Rawnsley's Bluff at the southern. A corresponding anticline is located in the adjacent Moralana Gorge with the Elder Range on the downturned western limb. The area has given its name to the Wilpena Group of sedimentary rocks which make up the younger sediments of the geosyncline and names of further subdivisions also originate from the area, particularly the Pound Subgroup made up of Rawnsley Quartzite and Bonney Sandstone which were laid down during the Ediacaran Period. Ediacaran fossils, such as Ikaria wariootia, have been found in this subgroup.

Although from the outside the Pound appears as a single range of mountains, it is actually two: one on the western edge and one on the eastern, joined by the long Rawnsley's Bluff at the south. A gorge called Wilpena Gap has been cut in the eastern range and most of the inside of the Pound drains into Wilpena Creek which exits through the Gap. A small part of the high northern slopes of the Pound drains into Edeowie Creek, which drains in time of flood over steep cliffs and waterfalls in Edeowie Gorge to the north.

The highest peak in the Pound, which is also the highest of the Flinders Ranges, is St Mary Peak (1171m), on the north-eastern side. To the south of the Gap, on the eastern side, the highest peak is Point Bonney (1133m). On the north-western side of the Pound, the highest point is Pompey's Pillar (1165m). Rawnsley's Bluff (950m) at the southern end is the other major summit.

The wall of mountains almost completely encircles the gently-sloping interior of the Pound, with the only breaks being the gorge at Wilpena Gap and a high saddle in the south-western range over which the Heysen Trail passes. This latter saddle is called Bridle Gap, supposedly because it is the only place other than the gorge where a skilled horseman might ride into the Pound. The interior of the Pound does not rise to a height at the northern edge, but instead simply drops off very steeply to the plain below in a series of steep gullies.

== Adnyamathanha account of formation ==
The Adnyamathanha people's language and culture (Yura Muda) passed down their tale of how the Wilpena peaks were formed by two dreaming serpents (Akurras) which ate a large number of people gathered for a celebration which caused the serpents to be unable to move from their eating grounds. The head of the male and female serpents formed St. Mary Peak and Beatrice Hill respectively.

== History ==
Wilpena Pound, at Bunyeroo or Brachina Gorge

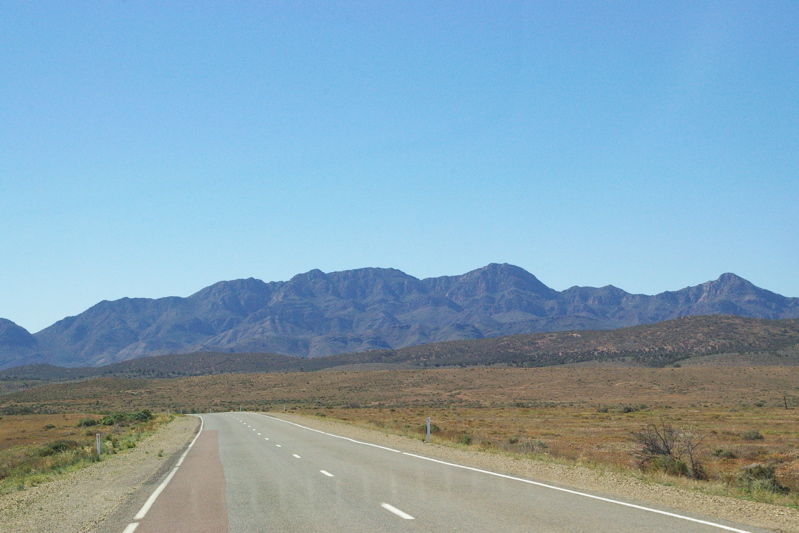
Pompey's Pillar seen from the south west

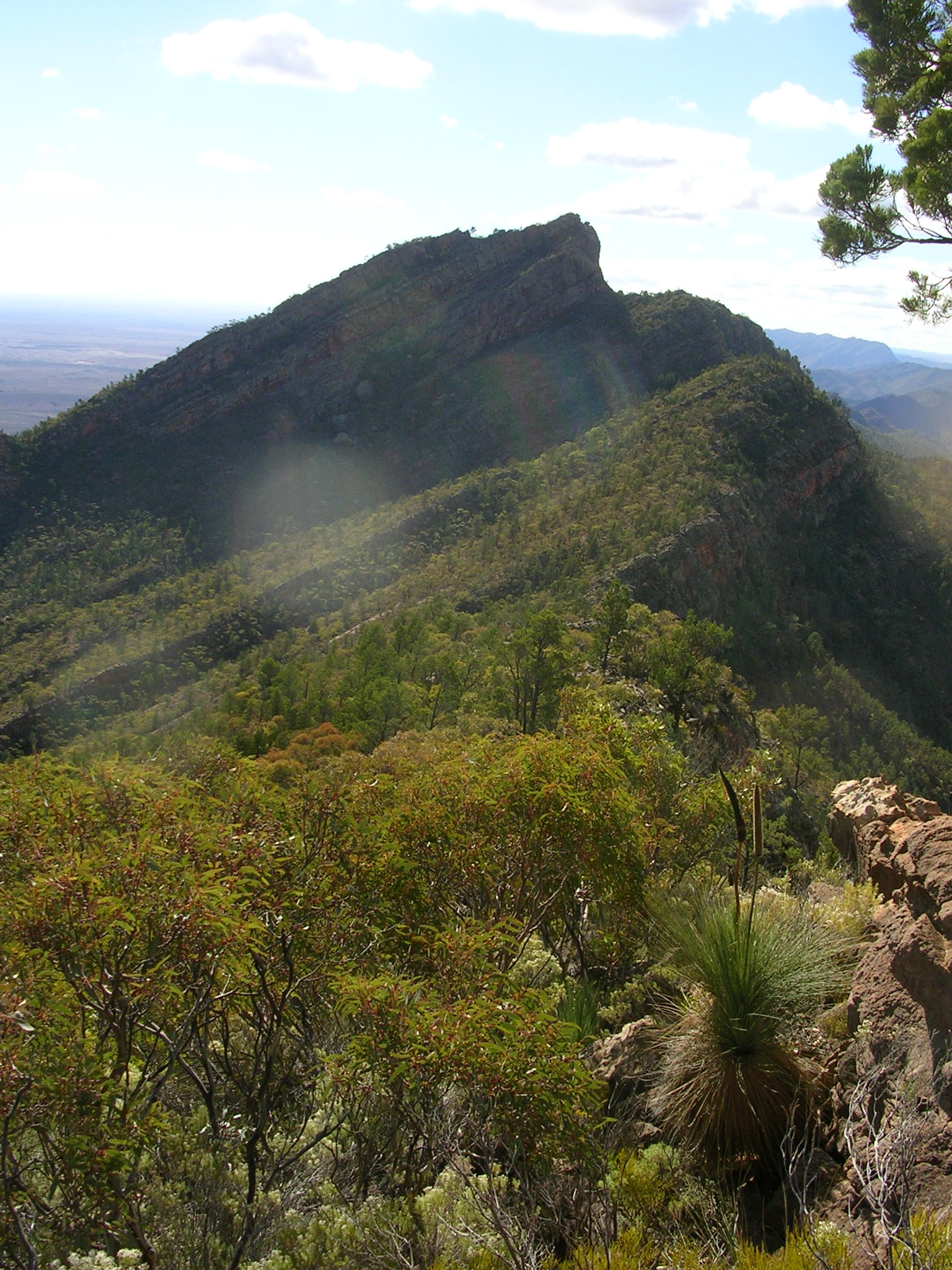
Mount Abrupt, a peak at the northern end of the pound

=== First Australians at Ikara/Wilpena Pound ===
The Adnyamathanha people inhabit an area of the Flinders Ranges including Ikara, which means "meeting place" in Adnyamathanha language. Archaeological evidence such as rock engravings and artefacts suggests that the Adnyamathanha people have inhabited the area for millennia (up to 49,000 years), according to recent finds at the Warratyi rock shelter. The national park is co-managed with Adnyamathanha people.

=== Colonial exploration and settlement ===
Edward Eyre was almost certainly the first European to sight the distant peaks of the Pound, while on his first 1839 expedition to the vicinity of Lake Torrens but he did not visit these ranges. Matthew Flinders' botanist Robert Brown had climbed one of the highest peaks of the southern Flinders in March 1802 but Wilpena would have been just over the horizon.

Immediately after Europeans first explored the ranges, discovering the Pound and its prospects for pastoralism, there was debate as to who was first. The likely discoverer, in 1850, was bushman William Chace, whose employers, the pastoralist brothers William Browne and John Browne, both medical doctors, had applied in 1850 for a pastoral lease there. The rival claimant was pastoralist C.N. Bagot, who described the country in June 1851 in a newspaper report, after having applied for a lease and claiming to be the discoverer. Within a week of Bagot's discovery claim appearing, it was indignantly refuted by the Browne's claim in favour of Chace. In an attempt to sort out these conflicting claims over the pastoral lease, Crown Commissioner of Lands, Charles Bonney and Surveyor-General Henry Freeling employed H.C. Rawnsley to go north and survey the area. Rawnsley only made it to the southern end of the Pound, which had been privately surveyed for the Brownes by Thomas Burr and Frederick Sinnett only a month or two earlier. On his arrival, Rawnsley found that the Bluff was already named after him by the locals. The Browne brothers eventually won the claim for Wilpena over Bagot.

==== Wilpena Station ====
The Brownes employed Henry Strong Price to open up and run the 40,000-hectare Wilpena Station for them. It was established in 1851 and was a working station until 1986. In 1861, Price purchased the Wilpena lease from the Brownes. By 1863 Wilpena consisted of well over 200,000 hectares but was nearly ruined by the drought of that decade. According to one account, the natural enclosure of the Pound was used for keeping horses. After Price died in 1889, the immediate 8,000-hectare area of the Pound was separated from the main run and leased separately. Today the historic precinct around Old Wilpena Homestead (4 km northeast of the park Visitor Centre) is an important pastoral settlement site.

Wilpena Eating House was built in 1862 about 3 km east of Old Wilpena Homestead, to service passing travellers, until the structure was abandoned in the 1880s with the rise of the railways west of the Pound. The structure was built with local pine slabs and a roof made from grass. A mound of stone is all that remains, not far from the Cazneaux Tree and Flinders Ranges Way.

==== Hill's homestead ====
When the Hill family obtained the Wilpena Pound lease in 1901, they decided to try farming, something never before attempted so far north. Goyder's Line had proven rather accurate with regard to agricultural expansion in the great drought of the 1880s and Wilpena is some 140 kilometres (87 mi) north of the line. However, being in the shadow of some of the highest mountains of the Flinders, rainfall in the Pound is a little higher with snow even being very rarely known on St Mary Peak.

After immense labour to construct a road through the torturous Wilpena Gap, the Hills built a small homestead at the gap, which has been restored, and cleared open patches in the thick scrub of the interior. For several years, the Hill family had moderate success growing crops inside the Pound but, in 1914, there was a major flood and the road through the gorge was destroyed. They could not bear to start all over and sold their homestead to the government.

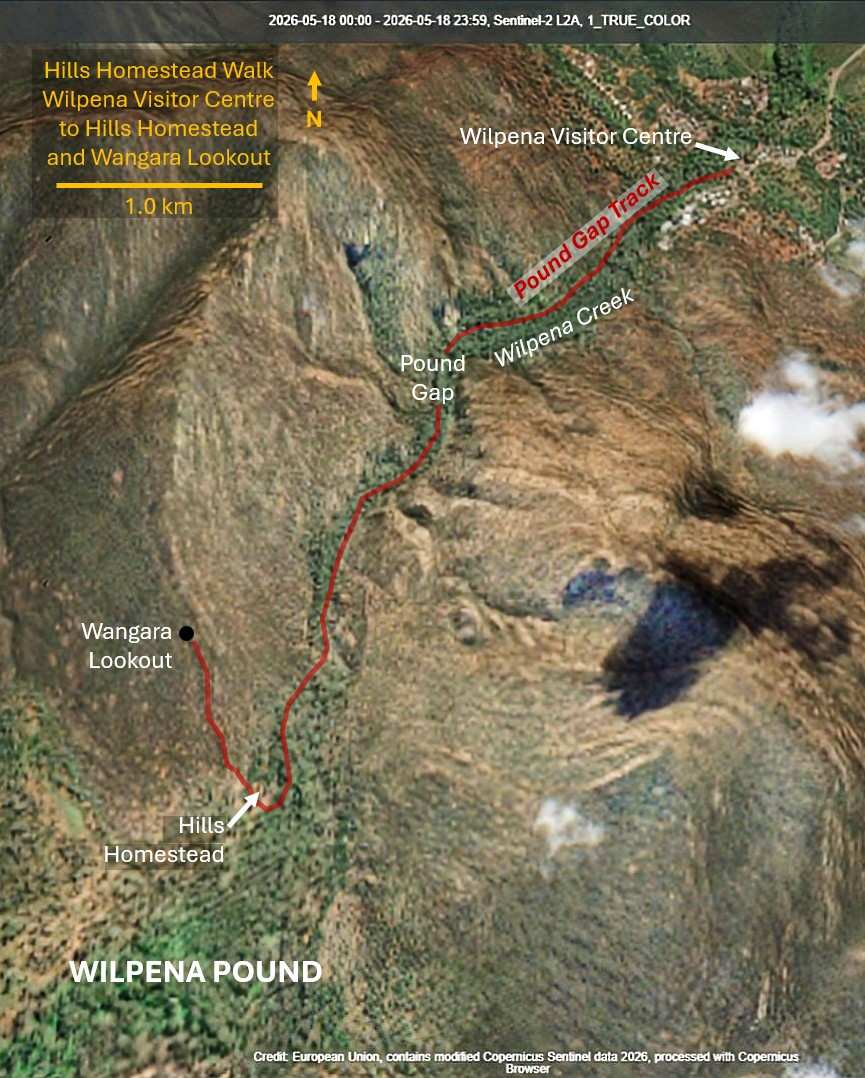
Satellite image-based map of the walk from Wilpena Visitor Centre to Hills Homestead and Wangara Lookout in Wilpena Pound.

Hill's Homestead can be visited on an easy 6.6-km round trip hike from the Wilpena Pound Visitor Centre.The Homestead is located at 31.546697°S 138.588860°E. The adjacent Wangara Lookout provides a panoramic view inside the Pound. There is no vehicle access inside the Pound and this walk is the shortest and easiest to reach it.

After the Hills sold their lease, the Pound then became a forest reserve leased for grazing.

=== Tourism ===
In 1945 the tourist potential of the area was recognised when a "National Pleasure Resort" was proclaimed. A hotel called the Wilpena Chalet was opened on the southern side of the creek just outside the gorge and it has been run by various private companies ever since. Kevin Rasheed and later his son, Keith, ran the Chalet for over 50 years.

Later, the Pound became part of the Flinders Ranges National Park.

== Nomenclature ==
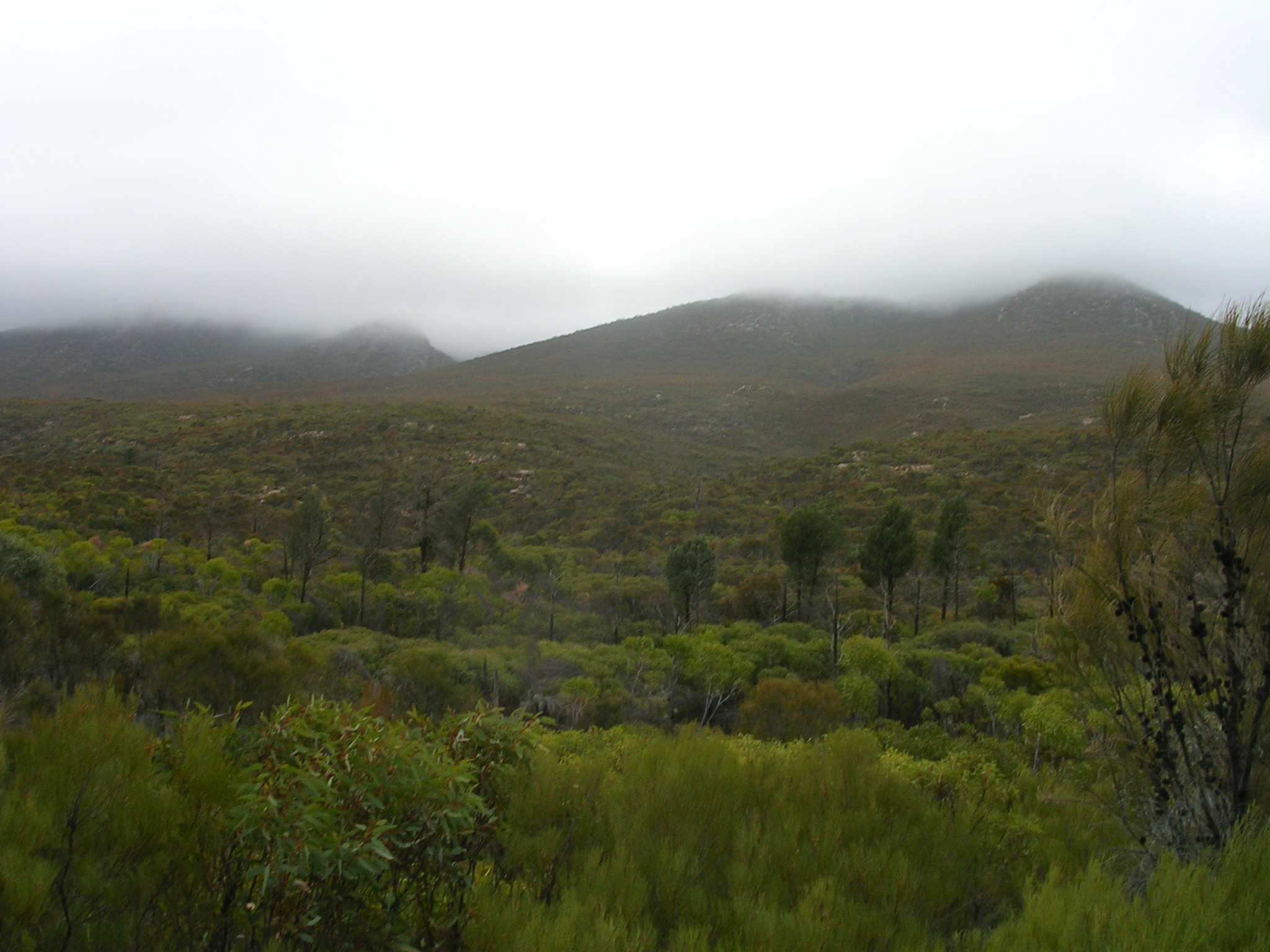
Foggy weather inside the pound

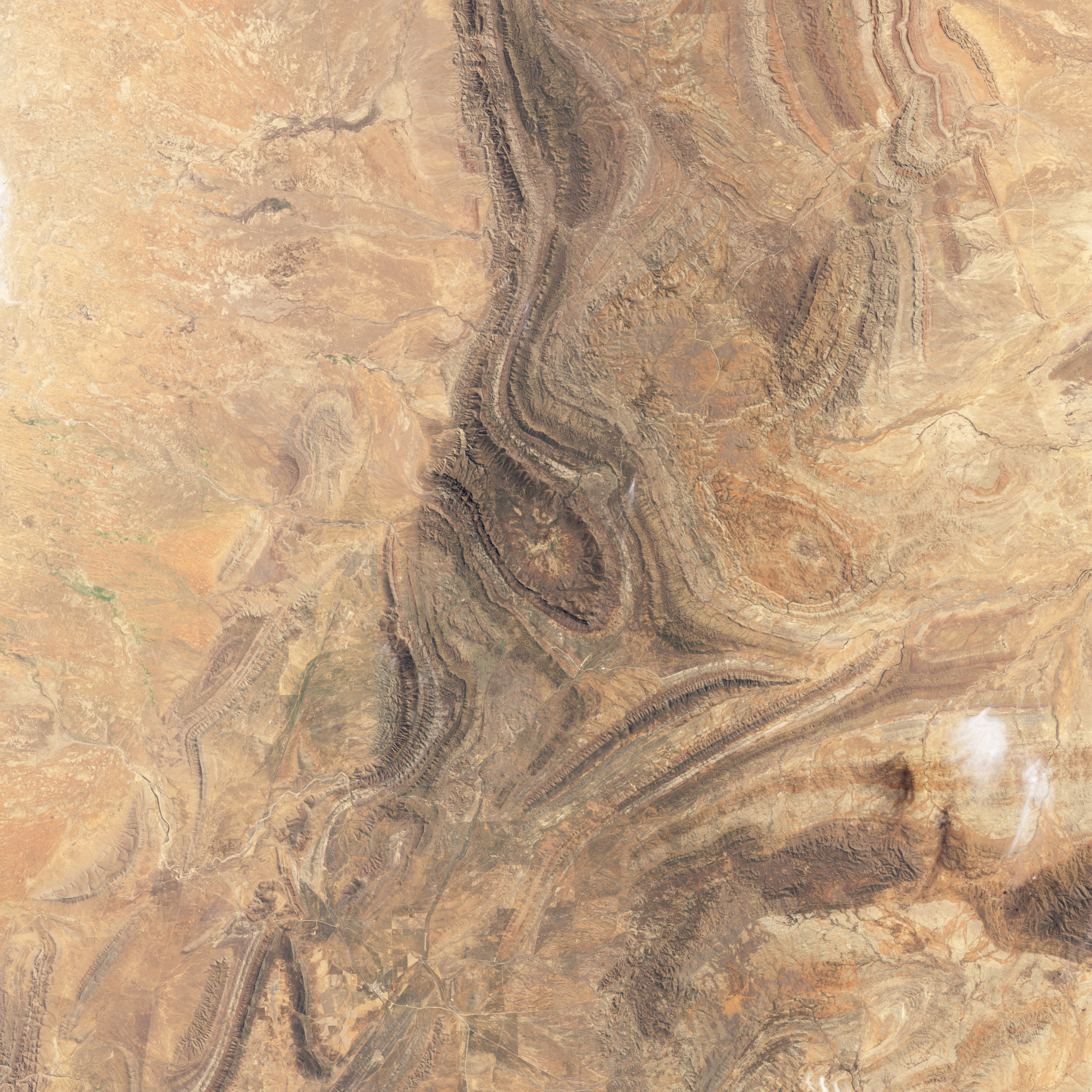
Satellite image of Wilpena Pound

Wilpena is dubiously claimed to be an Aboriginal word meaning "place of bent fingers" and it has been suggested this may be a reference to either the mountains resembling the shape of a gently cupped hand or the freezing cold of the ranges in winter. However, the Indigenous Adnyamathanha people have no such word in their language and their name for the Pound is Ikara which means "meeting place".

It's not clear who re-named Ngarri Mudlanha as St. Mary's Peak. A somewhat discredited turn-of-the-century account has the surveyor B.H. Babbage naming it St Mary's Peak in 1856, but a more credible account is that the pastoralist George Marchant suggested the name while in the area in 1851.

Point Bonney was named after the Crown Commissioner of Lands Charles Bonney. Rawnsley's Bluff is named after the surveyor H.C. Rawnsley. The peak directly to the south of Wilpena Gap was known informally through much of the later 20th century as Mount John, reportedly because bus drivers became so tired of tourists asking its name they dubbed it as such. However, it had been marked on a private survey in 1851 as Mount Ohlssen-Bagge after a business partner of the surveyor. In recent years the latter name has regained pre-eminence. The Adelaide Bushwalkers produced a detailed map of the Pound in 1959 in which they gave generic aboriginal names to many of the eastern peaks: Attunga Bluff ("high place"), Tanderra Saddle ("resting place"), Timburru Peak ("steep"), and Wangara Hill (a popular lookout to the north of Wilpena Gap) date from this map.

The peaks on the western range were named as part of a detailed survey for the Hundred of Moralana in 1895. The surveyor William Greig Evans named them all after his family and associates: Dorothy's Peak, Beatrice Hill, Madge's Hill, Harold's Hill are after his children, Reggie's Nob his brother, Greig's Peak himself, and Dick's Nob, Walter's Hill and Fred's Nob are after members of his surveying party. Bimbornina Hill has recently gained some usage as a name for Dick's Nob, which overlooks Bridle Gap. The 1851 name for Dorothy's Peak was Mount Boord, after the pioneer of Oraparinna station but this name has not regained any usage.

== Climate ==
Wilpena Pound has a semi-arid climate. The record rainfall in a single day is 173 mm. Summers are hot. Between December and February, daytime temperatures average between 31.8(89.24 °F) and 33.8 °C(92.84 °F) with night minimums averaging between 16 °C(60.8 °F) and 18 °C(64.4 °F). Winters are cool to cold. Between June and August, daytime temperatures average between 15.9 °C(60.62 °F) and 17.7 °C(63.86 °F) with night minimums averaging between 3.7 °C(38.6 °F) and 4.6 °C(40.3 °F).

== Tourism ==
Wilpena Pound is one of the most visited sites in the Flinders Ranges. Wilpena Pound Resort is just outside Wilpena Pound and Rawnsley Park Station is on the western side. Scenic flights are available from unsealed airstrips at Wilpena Pound resort and Rawnsley Park 30 kilometres (19 mi) north east of Hawker. Rock climbing is an attraction, with the Moonarie, a quartzite cliff of about 120m located on the upper rim, being a hotspot for rock climbers.

Arkaroo rock has aboriginal paintings depicting events in Flinders Ranges, such as the formation of Wilpena Pound.

Harold Cazneaux took his famous picture of a lonely tree surviving in the harsh semi-arid climate of Wilpena Pound.

=== Bushwalking ===
The Pound is popular for bushwalking. Short relatively easy walks of a few hours can be made not far off the main road. More difficult walks, taking the best part of a day, can be made up to St Mary Peak. In recent years, some Adnyamathanha people have asked that people stop short of the peak and indicated it is sacred. The traverse of the peaks from Reggie's Nob to Mount Abrupt is a difficult walk requiring several days. The peaks are very rugged and thick scrub and timber inside the pound can make navigation difficult.

In 1959, 12-year-old Nicholas George Bannon became separated and lost from a group of eight walking inside the Pound and, despite search efforts, died. His remains were not located until 18 months later. A pass on the upper slopes of St Mary Peak is named after him. His brother, John Bannon, later became the Premier of South Australia.

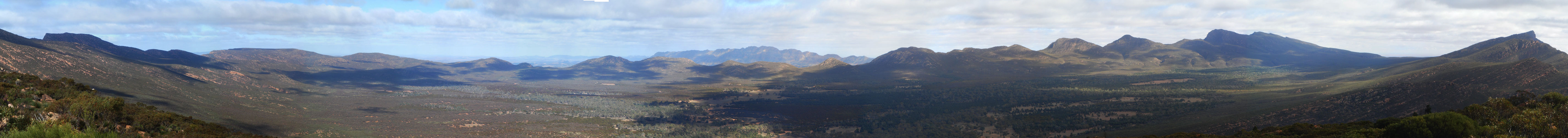
Panoramic view of the pound

== See also ==
- Structural basin
