= St Mary Peak =

Mountain in South Australia

St Mary Peak / Ngarri Mudlanha
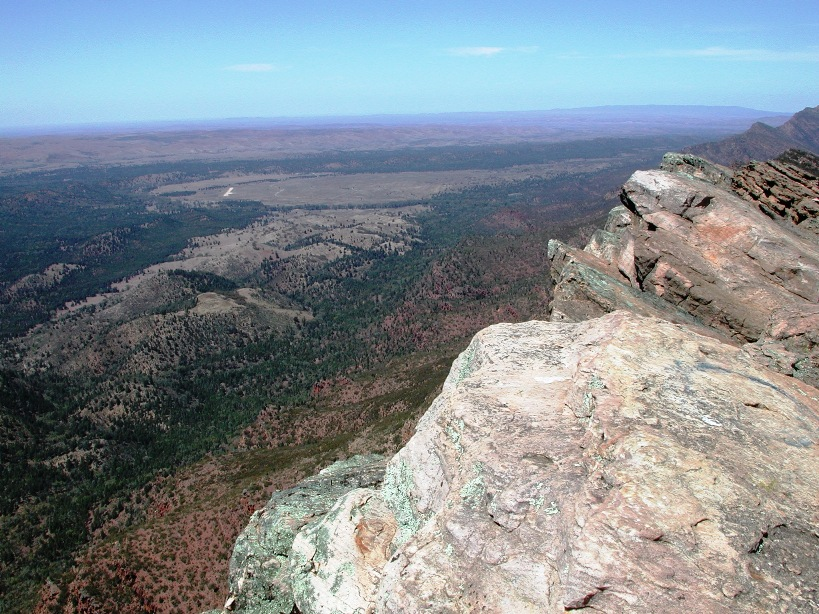
- St Mary Peak, view east from the summit

Highest point
- Elevation: 1189
- Coordinates: 31°30′14″S 138°33′00″E

Geography
- Location within South Australia Location within Australia
- Location: Flinders Ranges, South Australia, Australia
- Parent range: Flinders Ranges

Climbing
- Easiest route: Hike

St Mary Peak / Ngarri Mudlanha is a mountain located in the Australian state of South Australia on the northwestern side of Ikara. It is the highest peak in the Flinders Ranges and the eighth highest peak in South Australia, with a height of 1,189 metres (3,901 ft). It is located within the Ikara–Flinders Ranges National Park and the gazetted locality of Flinders Ranges, South Australia. It was for a time known as "St Mary's Peak", but was renamed according to guidelines deprecating the use of names implying possession.

The Adnyamathanha people have expressed concern with tourists trekking to the peak as they regard it as a sacred place and not to be visited. However, the peak and its surroundings may be accessed via a walking trail from Wilpena Resort along the north-east edge of the range outside of Ikara, or via a longer trail through the middle of the pound.

== See also ==
- List of mountains in Australia
