= Woodhouse (surname) =

Woodhouse is an English surname.

It is of the same etymology, but to be distinguished from, the surname of the Wodehouse family of Norfolk. The family of Woodhouse of Womburne Woodhouse originates with Benedict Wodehouse of Womburne (fl. 1550); the spelling Woodhouse was used from the 17th century. The modern surname may derive from any of several places called Woodhouse or Wodehouse in England, and people who share the surname are not necessarily related to the Womburne Woodhouse family, or to one another.

Notable people with the surname include:

- Airini Woodhouse (1896–1989), New Zealand community leader, historian, and author
- Barbara Woodhouse (1910–1988), British dog trainer and television personality
- Brad Woodhouse, communications director of the United States Democratic National Committee
- Charles Woodhouse (1893–1978), British admiral
- Chase G. Woodhouse (1890–1984), Canadian educator and (United States) congresswoman
- Christopher Woodhouse, 6th Baron Terrington (born 1946), British urologist
- Cindy Woodhouse (* 1982/3), Canadian First Nations politician
- Curtis Woodhouse (born 1980), English footballer and boxer
- Dallas Woodhouse (born 1972/3), American political operative
- Danielle Woodhouse (born 1969), Australian water polo player
- David Woodhouse (born 1949), Archdeacon of Warrington
- Edith Woodhouse (c. 1860 -1918), Scottish-born New Zealand artist
- Fred Woodhouse (1912–1998), Australian athlete
- Frederick W. Woodhouse (1821–1909) and (1846–1927), Australian painters
- George Woodhouse (1924–1988), English cricketer and brewer
  - Hall & Woodhouse, English brewery, owned by the above
- Greg Woodhouse (born 1960), Australian footballer
- Hedley Woodhouse (1920–1984), Canadian jockey
- Henry Woodhouse (disambiguation), several people
- Herbert James Woodhouse (1854–1937), Australian painter
- James Woodhouse (chemist), (1770–1809), United States chemist
- James Woodhouse, 1st Baron Terrington, (1852–1921), British politician
- Jane Woodhouse, American politician
- John Woodhouse (disambiguation), several people
- Jonathan Woodhouse (minister) (born 1955), British minister, former Chaplain General
- Joyce Woodhouse (born 1944), American politician
- L. G. O. Woodhouse (1888–1965), British civil servant and naturalist
- Luke Woodhouse (born 1988), English darts player
- Mark Woodhouse (basketball) (born 1982), British basketball player
- Mark Woodhouse (cricketer) (born 1967), Zimbabwean cricketer
- Martin Woodhouse (1932–2011), British author and scriptwriter
- Mary Woodhouse (died 1656), musician and letter writer.
- Michael Woodhouse (born 1965), New Zealand politician and healthcare executive
- Montague Woodhouse, 5th Baron Terrington (1917–2001), British politician and writer
- Owen Woodhouse (1916–2014), New Zealand judge
- Robert Woodhouse (1773–1827), English mathematician
- Rob Woodhouse (born 1966), Australian Olympic swimmer turned company director
- Robyn Woodhouse (1943–2026), Australian high jumper
- Samuel Washington Woodhouse (1821–1904), American surgeon, explorer and naturalist
- Stan Woodhouse (1899–1977), English footballer
- Thomas Woodhouse (died 1573), English Roman Catholic martyr
- Tristram Woodhouse (born 1974), Australian field hockey player
- Vera Woodhouse, Lady Terrington (1889–1956), British politician
- Violet Gordon-Woodhouse (1872–1951), British harpsichordist
- William Woodhouse (cricketer) (1856–1938), English cricketer
- William Woodhouse (artist) (1857–1939), English artist
- William Woodhouse (naval officer) (before 1517 – 1564), MP for Great Yarmouth, Norwich, and Norfolk
- William Woodhouse (MP for Aldeburgh), MP for Aldeburgh 1604–1621
- William John Woodhouse (1866–1937), English classical scholar and author

== Fictional characters ==
- Emma Woodhouse, eponymous heroine of Jane Austen's novel Emma
- Arthur Woodhouse, valet to the title character in the 2009 American animated TV series Archer

== See also ==
- Wodehouse (surname)
- Baron Terrington
