= Quiz (newspaper) =

Australian newspaper

Quiz was a weekly newspaper published in Adelaide, South Australia from 1889 to 1910. Between 1890 and 1900 it was known as Quiz and The Lantern.

== Publishing history ==
The paper's first issue was published on 31 August 1889, the masthead proclaiming it to be "A satirical, social and sporting journal." It had 12 pages, priced 3d.

The issue of Friday 13 June 1890 (Vol.1, No.42) was the first to bear the title Quiz and The Lantern. The Lantern was a newspaper owned by Frank Skeffington Carroll from 1876 to 1882, then Charles F. Stansbury, who took on Charles A. Murphy as partner then took over E. H. Derrington's Adelaide Punch in 1884. "Autolycus" (C. R. Wilton)'s comment was "Now that solemn publication has been swallowed up by the sprightly Quiz. "A Pencil" (Sir William Sowden) of the Kapunda Herald and the Southern Cross editor also used that adjective.

The issue of 27 December 1907 (Vol.XI, No.556) of 18 pages reverted to the title The Quiz.

The issue of Friday 27 December 1907 (Vol.XIX, No.1040) of 14 pages, price 1d., was the last which has been digitised as part of the Australian National Library's Trove program.

Quiz had offices in Bray Street from 1890 to 1927, shared with Sporting Life magazine 1914–1927. The Herald had offices in the same street 1899–1910 but the connection between the two, if any, is not clear. Bray street in those days crossed Gawler Place, between Flinders and Wakefield streets, and on its western end connected to Victoria Place. The current Bray Street is on the eastern side only.

== Personnel ==
Quiz was founded by Harry Congreve Evans (c. 1860 – 9 January 1899) as editor, Alfred T. Chandler (co-editor until 1895), James Hutchison M.P., Harry Craker, and A. W. G. Smith. Hutchison, Craker and Smith had been sacked in 1888 by the Register for union activities and started their own printing company. W. J. Kennedy (1847–1894), headmaster of Hindmarsh school, was for a time their cartoonist (also with Adelaide Punch), followed by J. H. Chinner.

Evans was succeeded by James Ewan Mackay (born around 1870 and compiler of histories of Western Australia and South Australia). Crawford Vaughan and Harry Craker were later editors; W. B. Carr (later Chairman of the Adelaide Stock Exchange) was sporting editor.

== Libel cases ==
In 1891 Joshua Ives, Professor of Music at Adelaide University brought a libel case against Evans and Chandler after a February story in Quiz about a person who offered to sell a parcel of shares at a certain price then reneged the following day when their value had increased. Ives' name was mentioned indirectly in the article. In June 1891 Evans and Chandler unreservedly withdrew the paragraph complained of, expressed regret that it should ever have been inserted, and agreed to pay the Professor's costs fixed at £50. His Honor said there was no objection to the settlement of a private prosecution, and he did not see why he should interfere. The case was then settled, the Jury discharged, and the Court rose.

Chandler and Evans were sued for libel in 1892 by Stilling Duff and Frank Gerald, theatrical agents and performers, for an article which accused them of appropriating funds promised for the Broken Hill Fire Brigade. After a trial before Justice James Boucaut which focussed on whether Chandler and Evans were or were not proprietors of the newspaper, the jury found for the defendants.
