= J. H. Leonard =

Australian cartoonist (c.1863–1929)

Joseph John Henry Leonard (c. 1863 – 19 November 1929) was an Australian newspaper illustrator, whose work first appeared in the Adelaide satirical weeklies, signed variously as "J. H. Leonard", "Leo", or simply "JL".

== Early life ==
Leonard was born in Gawler, South Australia, the youngest child of Congregationalist minister James C. Leonard BA and his second wife Anne Leonard, née Smithers (c. 1815 – 26 April 1908). He was educated at his father's schools at Bentley, near Gawler, and at Angaston. He was, with fellow Angaston student James Scandrett and Oscar Nootnagel from Adelaide Educational Institution, admitted as a cadet to the Civil Service in July 1879, and worked in the office of the Colonial Architect. His father had a brother in London, a successful painter in oils, who signed his work as "L. H. Leonard", and the subject of this article, who was a self-taught artist, signed much of his work the same way. This may have led to confusion over authorship of some works.

== Career ==
In 1880, as "J. J. H. Leonard", he won a prize for an India ink drawing, and after finding a ready market for his pen-and-ink sketches, caricatures and lithographs (as "Leo") in the Port Adelaide News, The Lantern, Adelaide Punch and Frearson's Weekly, he felt sufficiently confident to quit his job and became chief cartoonist for The Lantern, which at that time boasted a fine stable of artists: A. S. Broad, J. H. Chinner, Alfred Clint, H. J. Woodhouse, James Ashton and John Hood.

He established an upstairs studio in Flinders Street.

Leonard had other talents: he was a capable light tenor, and an actor, one of the more successful players in H. J. Woodhouse's short-lived Yorick Club of amateur thespians, providing additional entertainment with "lightning sketches" of local celebrities when they played at large towns such as Kapunda and Gawler.

In 1886 he left Adelaide to take a position with Melbourne Punch.

In 1888 he famously exhibited, in a Bourke Street shop window, an oil painting satirizing the free market champion Henry Parkes as King Lear with the dying Cordelia (representing the NSW economy) in his arms. A similar cartoon, reportedly published in Melbourne Punch, has yet to be found.

He moved to Sydney, and by 1892 was employed by the Illustrated Sydney News.

Leonard was particularly virulent in his denunciation of the bankers who closed their doors in the 1893 banking crisis.

In 1893 he and Gilbert Probyn Smith (died 1905), as proprietors of a Sydney publication named Police News, were tried for criminal libel, but the Attorney-General declined to prosecute.

=== Some works ===
"The Mirror", a wine bar in Rowe Street, Sydney, was decorated with hundreds of his sketches of well-known people.

Leonard's drawing Soldiers of the Queen, of men in various uniforms, in The Australian Field of December 1900, was the first colored artwork published in an Australian newspaper.

He illustrated, as "Leo", "A Vagabond"'s 1877–78 five volumes of reminiscences with a portrait of the author, John Stanley James ("Julian Thomas"), on the frontispiece and line illustrations throughout. These illustrations were carried through to the single volume condensed version,

- John Stanley James (1969). Michael Cannon (ed.). The Vagabond Papers. Melbourne University Press. ISBN 0522839460..

As a challenge, or proof of his skill with the pen, in 1901 he drew a 21 by 18 inches (530 mm × 460 mm) portrait, on card, of the Duke and Duchess of Cornwall and York, surrounded by Australian wildflowers and the representation of an ornamental frame, all consisting of one line only, without a break or crossing, and of varying width to create light and shade, commencing at the tip of one nose and terminating at the other. Quite apart from its value as a demonstration of penmanship, it was said to be an excellent drawing.

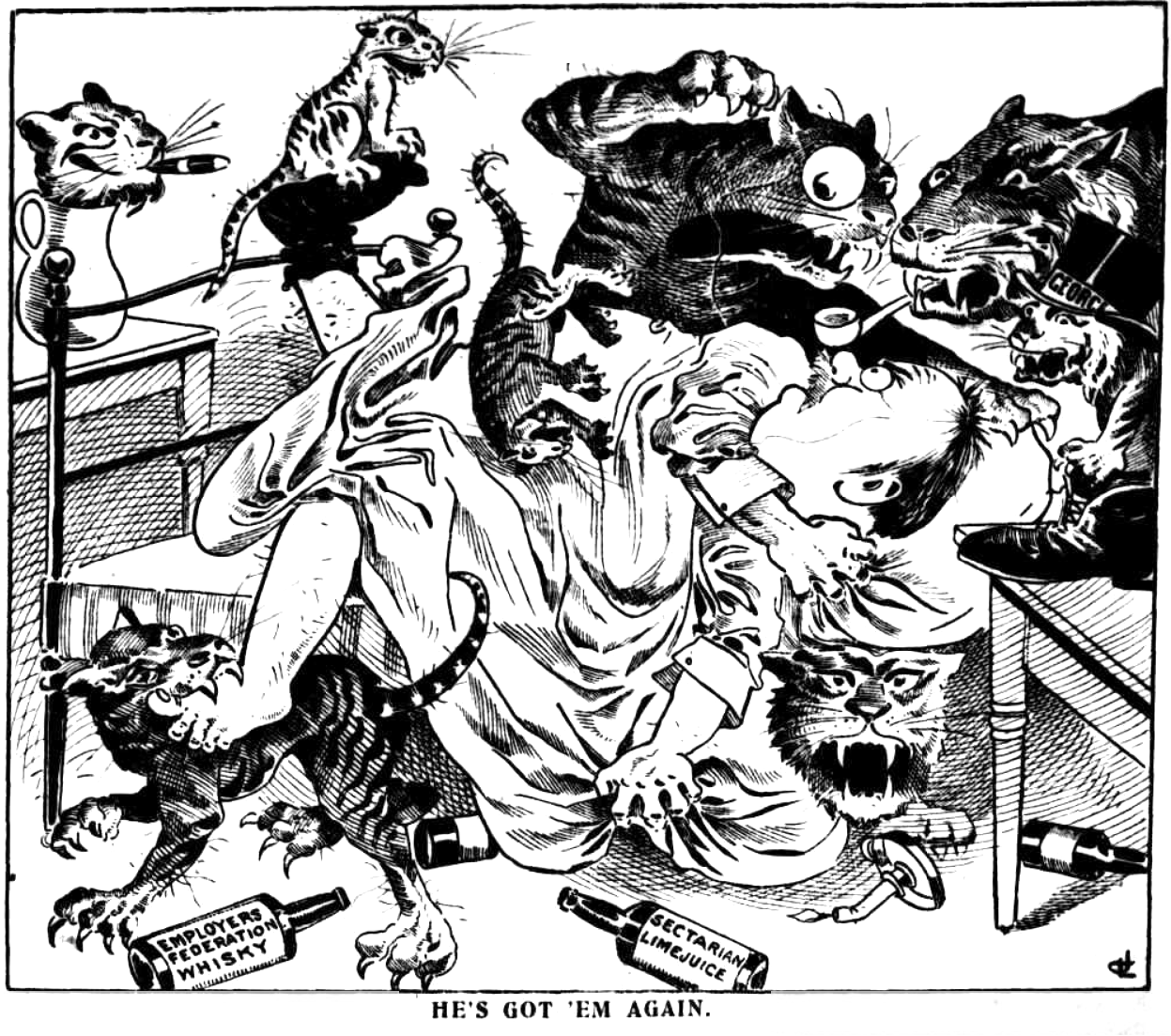
Cartoon by J. L.

It has been suggested that the cartoon "He got 'em again" published in The Brisbane Worker in 1906, was by Leonard. This has not been found, but is probably the "He's Got 'em Again" (i.e. "the horrors", delirium tremens) in the New South Wales Worker. The signature at the lower right corner is an interlocked "JL".

He was also known for creating illuminated addresses. Recipients included:

- E. Kidgell, sub-editor of The Sunday Times
- H. M. Evans, managing director of the publishers of The Sunday Times, The Referee, and The Arrow.
- Mr Bates, stationmaster at Mortdale
- Presentation at St George's Hall, Mortdale, to Dr. J. Eli Webb and nurses Palmer, Bantin, Bastin and Grattin for their work i the 'flu epidemic of 1917–20
- W. I. Donald, Town Clerk, of Hurstville, who had returned from the war.
- Presentation at the Masonic Hall, Hurstville, to ex-alderman Hugh Patrick.

Some, perhaps all, of these were produced gratis, out of respect for the intended recipient.

== Family ==
Some time around 1895 Leonard married the divorcee Margaret Deleuil. One of her children was Adolphe Louie Deleuil (died 8 November 1920), father of Leonard Adolphe Deleuil, who was awarded an MBE in 1971.

The Leonards were generous and thoughtful citizens. A few examples:

- Mortdale Belgian fund 1915
- "Thousand Bricks" campaign 1920
- Wreath for the War Memorial, Anzac Day 1926

Leonard had a studio at 121 Bathurst Street Sydney, and family homes at Kimberley Road, Hurstville and "Malalo" at 24 Oxford Street, Mortdale.

He died at a private hospital, Kogarah, on 19 November 1929, and his remains were interred at the Church of England Cemetery, Woronora.
