= Melbourne Savage Club =

Gentlemen's club in Melbourne, Victoria, Australia

Coordinates: 37°48′59.73″S 144°57′37.5″E

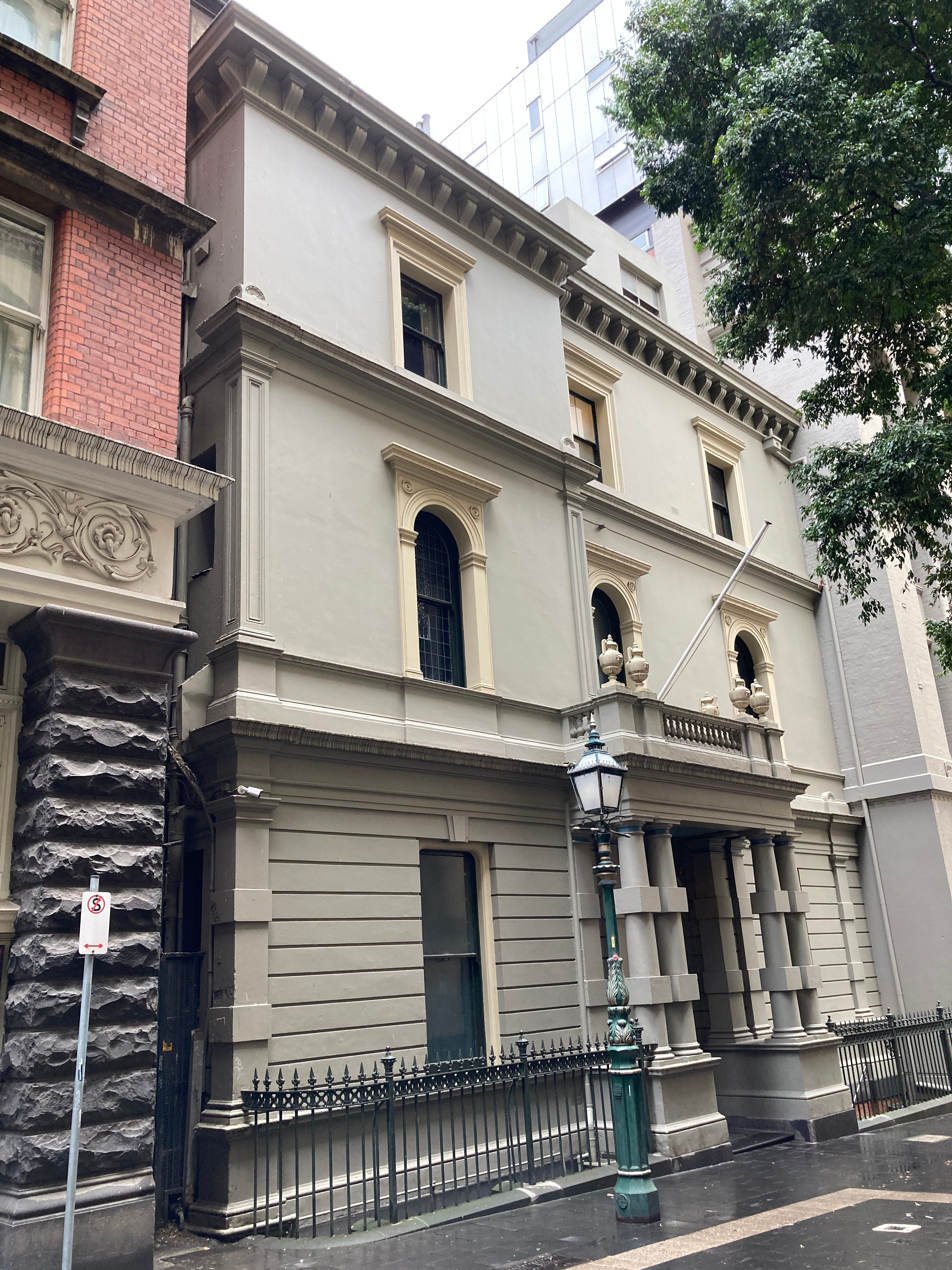
- Formation: 1894
- Founded at: Clubhouse occupied since 1923
- Purpose: The arts, science and law
- Location: Bank Place, Melbourne
- Website: www.melbournesavageclub.com

Melbourne Savage Club is a private Australian gentlemen's club founded in 1894 and named after the poet, Richard Savage. Bohemian in spirit, the club was to bring together literary men, and those immediately connected or sympathising with literature, the arts, sport or science. Its membership is particularly secretive with a strong code of silence; members are traditionally the elite or 'savages' in the arts, business and politics. Travelling savages enjoy good fellowship through reciprocal arrangements with other private clubs throughout the world.

== History ==
The Melbourne Savage Club, a gentlemen's club, was founded in 1894. Like the London-based Savage Club, established in 1857, it was named after Richard Savage (1697-1743), an English poet. Dr. Harvey E. Astles was the first President of the Melbourne Savage Club. In 1915, Hans Heysen donated a painting to the club. Sir Robert Menzies, longtime Prime Minister of Australia, served as its President from 1947 to 1962. The club incorporated the Yorick Club (with which it had a long and cordial rivalry, including regular cricket matches) in 1966. Hubert T. Frederico, QC, was President from 1974 to 1977. In 2012, the President was Robert Heathcote. The President as of 2016 is Ian Baillieu.

Although an organisation with the primary aim of members providing their own entertainment, it regularly participates in philanthropic activities. A pair of oil paintings "The Crucifixion" and "The Annunciation" by Club member Napier Waller were presented to All Saints Church in Geelong in 1929. Social events were organised with charitable and patriotic causes as beneficiaries.

== Building ==
The Club organised purchase of its building in Bank Place, Melbourne in 1923. Rent was paid to Melbourne Savages Ltd; all profits were distributed to shareholders annually. The building was originally designed by A. L. Smith and A. E. Johnson, with alterations conducted by Kingsley Henderson, who also designed two buildings on Collins Street – the Bank of Australasia building on the corner of Queen and Collins Streets and the Alcaston House (1929) at the corner of Spring Street. The building is of the few remaining townhouses in this area, and is a notable example of the transition Classical style between conservatism and boom and contributes to the character and townscape of Bank Place. Unusual external features include the portico with rusticated columns and first floor windows. The punkahs which ventilate the dining room are powered by electricity. The staircase and some fireplaces are also notable.

== Notable members ==
- Ted Baillieu, politician
- Senator George Brandis QC, Attorney-General of Australia
- Sir William Dargie, portraitist
- Sir Owen Dixon, judge
- Richard Morrow, stockbroker and Melbourne Mining Club Chairman
- John Elliott, businessman
- W. R. Guilfoyle, founder and curator of Melbourne's Botanic Gardens
- Lord Frances Ebury, 8th Earl of Wilton
- Alex Gurney, cartoonist
- Lindsay Bernard Hall, Director of the National Gallery of Victoria (1892-1935)
- Kingsley Anketell Henderson was president for seven years.
- King Hedley, actor
- Roy Cecil Hodgkinson, artist
- Barry Humphries, comedian
- J. C. F. Johnson, writer
- Sir John Longstaff, painter
- David Low, cartoonist
- Norman Macgeorge, artist and art critic
- Frederick McCubbin, painter
- W. B. McInnes, painter
- Dr Henry O'Hara, Collins Street doctor
- John Reed, art patron
- Sir Tom Roberts, painter
- Charles Victor Robertson, businessman
- Michael Salmon, artist and author
- William John "Billy" Schutt (died 30 November 1933), Supreme Court judge
- Sir Arthur Streeton, painter
- William Tainsh, poet and broadcaster; secretary in 1916
- Alfred Vincent, cartoonist and designer of the Club emblem
- Alberto Zelman, musician

== Other cities ==
Savage Clubs were formed in other Australian cities:

- The Adelaide club, one of several, was founded in 1883. Members in 1885 included Harry Congreve Evans, Alfred T. Chandler, and J. C. F. Johnson.
- The Perth club was founded in 1896. Dr Harvey E. Astles (past president of the Melbourne club) was its first president.
- The Sydney Savage Club was founded in 1934. Albert Collins was its president in 1936, Lindley Evans in 1954.

== Bibliography ==
- Johnson, Joseph Laughter and the Love of Friends: A Centenary History of the Melbourne Savage Club, 1894-1994
- A History of the Yorick Club 1868-1966, Melbourne Savage Club, Melbourne 1994
