= Mark Woodhouse =

Mark Woodhouse may refer to:

- Mark Woodhouse (basketball) (born 1982), British professional basketball player
- Mark Woodhouse (cricketer) (born 1967), Zimbabwean cricketer
