= William John Sowden =

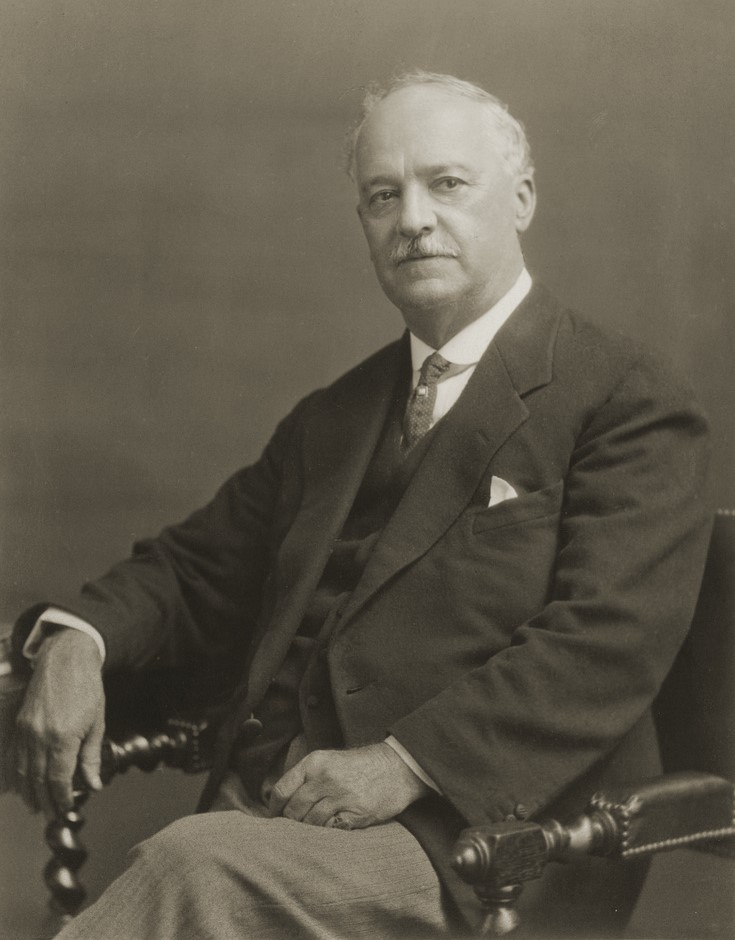
A photograph of Sir William

Sir William John Sowden (26 April 1858 – 10 October 1943) was a journalist in South Australia, who was knighted in 1918.

== History ==
Sowden was born in Castlemaine, Victoria, the son of Thomas Sowden (c. 1832 – 3 May 1888), a miner from Cornwall, and his wife Mary Ann, née Hocking. They spent some years in Kapunda, South Australia, where vast quantities of copper ore were being extracted, but by 1867 had returned to Castlemaine. There, he completed his schooling and started in the newspaper trade. In 1874 they moved to Moonta, South Australia, another mining town, where William started work with the Yorke's Peninsula Advertiser. In 1879, he transferred to the Port Adelaide News. Both papers were owned by E. H. Derrington, who was known for his feuds with Ebenezer Ward. In 1881 he started working for the South Australian Register, and was selected to accompany a group of parliamentarians (J. Langdon Parsons, H. E. Bright, L. L. Furner, J. H. Bagster), as well as Professor Ralph Tate and others, to the Northern Territory on the Menmuir (Captain Ellis) as a representative of the Register. On his return, he was given a position on the reporting staff and became chief writer in 1892. From 1897 to 1899 he was acting editor, becoming an editor and part-owner of the Register and holding that position until his retirement in September 1922.

He wrote, as "A. Pencil", a regular satirical column as city correspondent for the Kapunda Herald, much as C. R. Wilton, as "Autolycus", wrote for the Mount Barker Courier. He also wrote, as "A. Scribbler", a regular column "Echoes from the Smoking Room" for the Register.

He retired around 1925 to Castlemaine, the house designed by architect Henry Ernest Fuller in Victor Harbor, where he died.

== Recognition ==
He was knighted in 1918.

== Bibliography ==
In addition to his journalistic work, Sir William wrote numerous books:

- Sowden, William Sir; Tate, Ralph, 1840–1901 (1882), The Northern Territory as it is : a narrative of the South Australian Parliamentary party's trip, and full descriptions of the Northern Territory, its settlements and industries, W. K. Thomas & Co, ISBN 978-1-921315-45-9
- Sowden, William Sir (1919), The roving editors, W. K. Thomas & Co
- Sowden, William Sir (1925), Another Australian abroad : travel notes in Egypt and Palestine 1924-5, Cole's Book Arcade

== Other interests ==
Sir William was:

- the president of the Board of Governors of the Public Library, Art Gallery and Museum, beginning in 1908. His interference with the hanging of works in the Art Gallery prompted the curator Henri Van Raalte to resign in 1926. (The curator died from a self-inflicted gunshot wound a few years later.)
- actively associated with the South Australian Institute for 17 years
- founder and first president of the SA branch of the Wattle Day League
- the first president of the South Australian Soldiers' Fund, the Returned Soldiers' Association and the Cheer-Up Society. He was for 19 years president of Violet Memory Day (originally Violet Day), an initiative of the "Cheer-Ups"
- president of the South Australian board of the Australian Natives' Association for five years.
- the founder of the short-lived Wattle Blossom Day in 1890.
- the Acting Chief Scout for South Australia during the absence of the State Governor from Adelaide
- the first Federal president of the Australian Wattle Day League and State president of the League's South Australian Branch
- the founder and a president of the Royal Society of St. George
- the founder of four Masonic lodges and Master of three
- an active supporter of The Overseas League, the Prisoners' Aid Society, the Sick Poor Fund and the Christmas Cheer Fund
- a member of the Geographical Society and the Chamber of Commerce
- a member of the Adelaide Club starting in 1937.

Sir William made several extensive tours abroad, and as such was present in Westminster Abbey for the coronation of King George VI. He led a press delegation to England, accompanied by Sir James Fairfax. In 1918 he visited the battlefields of Europe as a guest of the Imperial Government.

== Family ==
He married Letitia Grace "Letty" Adams (? – 9 April 1928) of "Corio", Oakleigh, Victoria on 28 April 1886; they had two sons.

He married again, to Margaret Ella Suttie of Mosman, New South Wales on 2 April 1929.
