= Lloyd Dumas =

Australian journalist

Sir Frederick Lloyd Dumas (15 July 1891 – 24 June 1973), generally known as "Lloyd Dumas" or "F. Lloyd Dumas", was a journalist and politically influential newspaperman in Victoria and South Australia.

== Early history ==
Dumas was born in Mount Barker, South Australia, the fourth child and youngest of three sons of Amelia Dumas, née Paltridge, (died 1 November 1938) and Charles Dumas (1851–1935), who founded the Mount Barker Courier. A grandmother was a sister of Mount Barker pioneer John Dunn and his grandfather, Victor Dumas, ran a highly praised private school in Mount Barker. There is no confirmed connection with the French literary family.

He was educated at Mount Barker and Victor Harbor and in 1904 won a scholarship to the Teachers' College. He quit his studies in late 1906 or early 1907 to work for the Adelaide Advertiser and in mid-1910 helped out as interim Murray Bridge correspondent for his father's newspaper. In 1911 he was one of the founders of the South Australian branch of the Australian Journalists' Association. In 1914 he left for Victoria.

== Melbourne and London ==
Around 1915 he accepted a position on the literary staff of The Argus, and worked as a Federal roundsman. He publicly supported the pro-conscription stance of Prime Minister Billy Hughes and was chosen by Hughes to manage the "pro" campaign for the second conscription referendum. In 1918 Dumas accompanied him and Minister for the Navy Joseph Cook to the Imperial Conference in England.

He returned to the Argus after the war. Around 1922 the Melbourne Sun and Sun News-Pictorial had been founded by the publishers of the Sydney Sunto break into the Melbourne market. The daily newspaper failed, with a loss of between £120,000 and £150,000 in the first few years, but the Sun News-Pictorial was quite successful, and was purchased by the Herald & Weekly Times in 1925. Dumas was hired to oversee the transition and has been credited with the paper's subsequent success.

In 1927 he was sent to London to manage the Australian Newspapers Cable Service.

== Return to South Australia ==
He returned to Adelaide in 1929 to take up the position of Managing Editor with The Advertiser, which a consortium led by Keith Murdoch had just taken over. He was appointed to the board in 1931, became managing director from 1938 to 1961 and chairman from 1942 to 1967.

Dumas was, with Murdoch's blessing, pleased to be seen as a partisan editor, and throughout the Depression supported those he deemed as offering "sound government". He supported Lionel Hill as the Labor Premier, and continued to support him when he adopted the austerity measures of the "Premiers' Plan" in August 1931, through his sacking from the Labor Party and formation of a minority government with the support of Liberals, his resignation and finally his controversial appointment as Agent-General in London.

With the advent of (later Sir) Thomas Playford as Liberal Premier, Dumas found a leader whom he could whole-heartedly support. Playford had ambitious plans to encourage multi-national companies to establish manufacturing bases in the State, and immediately after World War II, with the support of The Advertiser and an electoral system biased towards country voters, set about implementing his plans, which involved nationalizing and upgrading the Adelaide Electric Supply Company and the various regional electricity providers as the Electricity Trust of South Australia (ETSA) and establishing the Housing Trust to provide austere but economical housing for workers with families, and courting major overseas companies such as General Motors and Philips Lighting and Electrical to establish manufacturing bases in South Australia, as well as encouraging established local companies such as BHP, Pope Products, Perry Engineering, Clipsal, Simpsons, SABCO and Actil to expand, resulting in a vibrant manufacturing sector, later decried as a "rust-bucket economy" and now largely dismantled.

== Other interests ==
Dumas was fond of good food and wine, to the detriment of his waistline, and was a gracious host. In 1930 Dumas was admitted as a member to the Adelaide Club.

He was a director of Australian Newsprint Mills Pty Ltd., a board-member of Herald and Weekly Times Ltd and chairman of directors of Reuters News Agency. He was on the board of the National Gallery of South Australia and chairman from 1955 to 1963. In addition, he sat on the board of directors of Elder, Smith & Co. Ltd from 1941 to 1967.

== Recognition ==
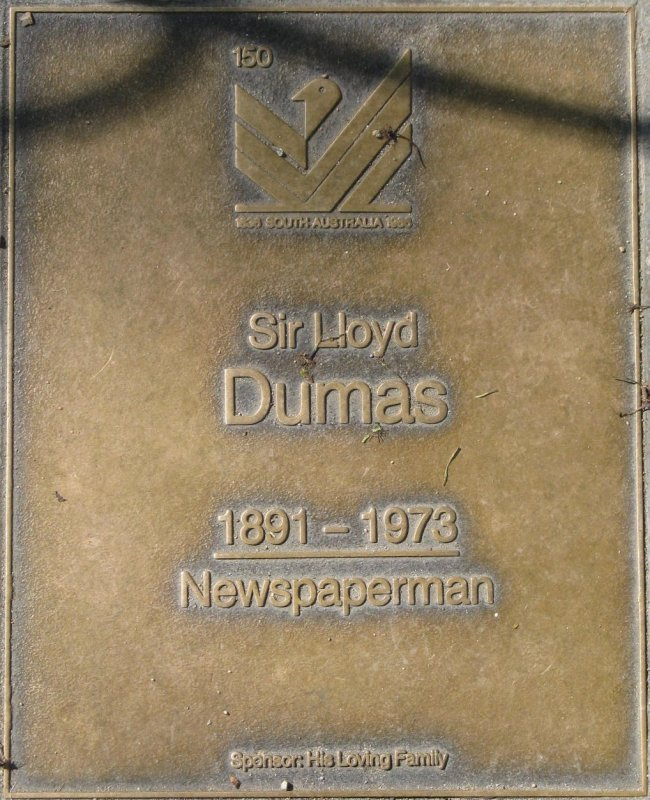
Jubilee 150 Walkway Plaque commemorating Sir Lloyd Dumas.

Dumas was knighted in 1946, "in recognition of service to the Public service in South Australia".

A portrait by Sir Ivor Hele was donated by his descendants to the National Portrait Gallery in 1999.

The Sir Lloyd Dumas Gallery of the Art Gallery of South Australia was named for him.

Dumas is included in the Jubilee 150 Walkway on North Terrace, Adelaide.

== Family ==
Dumas married Daisy Hall on 23 November 1915. They had three daughters:

- Josephine "Jo" Dumas, born 19 October 1916 in Hawthorn, Victoria; married Howard De Pledge Sykes in 1939.
- Rosslyn Dumas, born 14 October 1920 at Canterbury, Victoria
- Vivienne Lloyd Dumas, born 22 January 1927 at Camberwell, Victoria. Vivienne married Thomson Hilton Leys, in 1948. She moved to New Zealand and had 5 children. Four sons - Stephen, Mark, Simon and Andrew, and a daughter Phillipa.

== Bibliography ==
Dumas, Lloyd Sir (1969), The story of a full life, Sun Books

== Sources ==
- S. Cockburn, Dumas, Sir Frederick Lloyd (1891–1973), Australian Dictionary of Biography
