= Alfred Thomas Chandler =

Australian poet and author

- Born: 3 June 1852; Geelong, Victoria, Australia
- Died: 17 October 1941 (aged 89); Perth, Western Australia, Australia
- Occupations: Journalist and poet

Alfred Thomas Chandler (3 June 1852 – 17 October 1941) was a journalist, editor and newspaper proprietor in Victoria, South Australia and Western Australia. He was prominent in the Western Australian secession movement.

== History ==
Chandler was born in Geelong, Victoria, and began his journalistic career on The Hamilton Spectator. He moved to Adelaide, where he found employment with both daily papers: the South Australian Register (editor Will Sowden, in an article on Adelaide press clubs, remembers Chandler as a compositor.), then The Advertiser. He was a member of the Adelaide Savage Club, contributing several admired poems to the club's 1885 Christmas Annual. He was, in 1889, with H. O. Evans, J. M. Black, and J. R. Powell, a member of the House of Assembly's first Hansard staff. While working at The Advertiser he published two books of verse: A Bush Idyl and Songs of the Sunland. He joined Harry Evans as co-editor of Quiz, a satirical weekly, to which he also regularly contributed examples of his poetry. Chandler was a keen cricketer, a welcome member of the Press team in the annual Press v. Parliament matches.

On 31 August 1894 he left the partnership (of, by then, Quiz and The Lantern) and left for Coolgardie, where he worked on J. M. Smith's weekly Goldfield Courier and its sister daily, the Golden Age. In 1896 he was elected secretary to the Coolgardie Stock Exchange and the Coolgardie Railway League. He was next editor of the Coolgardie Miner, and gained a great deal of knowledge on the subject of mining, and served as John Kirwan's Coolgardie secretary. In 1905 he left the Miner for the position of secretary to the North End Gold Mining Company Ltd.

Around 1911 he moved to Perth, where he joined the staff of The Sunday Times and around 1920 was promoted to editor, succeeding J. E. Webb, who left for a position with The Bulletin. He retired around 1925, but continued contributing to the Sunday Times and other journals.

Around 1919 he joined the newspaper's owner, James MacCallum Smith, in a campaign to gain independence from the other States of Australia, founding the Secession League, and was active in the later Dominion League of Western Australia, and its president when a secession petition was tabled in the House of Commons. In 1937 he contributed an article to the Sunday Times on the life of Arthur Lovekin.

In 1938 he was granted a Commonwealth Literary Pension of £1 a week.

== Family ==
Chandler married Isabella Agnes McGinn (c. 1855 – 16 April 1888). He married again, to Julia Addison (died 9 August 1950), daughter of George Addison MD, FRCS, on 17 September 1892. They later had a home at 27 Ridge Street, South Perth. He had two daughters:

- Lorna married Peter Charles Mulhall of Perth on 8 February 1919; they lived at East Brunswick, Victoria
- Isabel married E. Bagg of Kojonup, Western Australia

No relationship has been found for Charles Walter Chandler (1861–1936), controversial Adelaide journalist and founder of several newspapers.

== Death ==
He died in 1941.

== Publications ==
- A Bush Idyl and other poems E. S. Wigg & Son. 1887
- Songs of the Sunland E. S. Wigg & Son. 1889
- The Case for Secession W.A. Secession League 1926
