= Harry Congreve Evans =

South Australian journalist

- Born: Harry Congreve Evans; 10 December 1860; Nuriootpa, South Australia
- Died: 9 January 1899 (aged 38); Adelaide, South Australia
- Other name: Henry Congreve Evans
- Occupations: Journalist; Editor; Newspaper proprietor

Henry Congreve Evans (10 December 1860 – 9 January 1899) was a journalist, editor and newspaper proprietor of South Australia.

== Biography ==
The Rev. Ephraim Evans (1825 – 6 April 1863), a Baptist minister born in Wales, married Mary Ann Wilton (1830–1858), and emigrated to South Australia around 1854. He was sent to the Reedy Creek (now Palmer) copper mine, where he ministered and taught at the local school, then in 1856 to Nuriootpa, where his workload forced him to abandon teaching. They had a son and a daughter before she died, in 1858. On 16 February 1860 he married Matilda Jane Congreve (7 August 1827 – 22 October 1886), who wrote under the pseudonym Maud(e) Jean(ne) Franc. They had two sons: Henry "Harry" Congreve Evans, born at Nuriootpa, and William James "Will" Evans (1862–1904). He died at South Rhine on Easter Monday 1863 aged 38 years.

Before her marriage Matilda and her sister Emily, who were descended from the family of William Congreve, ran a school at Mount Barker, and it was there that the first of her literary work was done. After the death of her husband she opened a boarding school for girls at Angaston to maintain the four children, but in late 1868, with help from George Fife Angas she sent the two eldest to their father's step-mother in London, where they were neither wanted nor well looked-after. As soon as he was old enough, Ebenezer started working for J. B. Maple & Co., but ill-health prompted his return to Australia in 1878, accompanied by his sister; they opened a store at Tarcowie. Matilda Evans moved to Adelaide with her two sons Harry and Will, who received further tuition at John Whinham's North Adelaide Grammar School.
Her brother, Henry John "Harry" Congreve (31 March 1829 – 10 July 1918) emigrated to South Australia in 1849, lived for some time in Port Lincoln and Inglewood, Victoria. In 1880 he joined the Gawler Standard, then in 1885 the Bunyip when those two papers merged, resigning in 1890. He was a prolific writer, often as "H.J.C.", for other journals such as the Adelaide Observer.

After leaving school, Evans found employment with Fanning & Co., then at the age of 16 joined The Advertiser, where he was noted for his stenographic skills and the speed and clarity of his longhand writing, while his energy, good humour and organising ability earned for him leadership of the literary staff. In 1888, as a result of a tour made with Frank Johnson, Minister of Education, to the Northern Territory, he produced an interesting series of articles for his paper. But he craved an outlet for his independent thought and writing, and with A. T. Chandler (also ex-Advertiser), James Hutchison, Harry Craker, and A. W. Gresswell Smith, founded Quiz, a weekly humorous and satirical publication. Five years later, when Chandler left the partnership, Evans continued as sole editor. The paper was well received by the public and in 1890, by absorbing a competitor, became Quiz and The Lantern. Evans was the librettist of Immomeena, composed by Moritz Heuzenroeder, and The Mandarin, composed by John M. Dunn, organist and choirmaster of St. Peter's Cathedral, and both performed at the Theatre Royal, in 1893 and 1896 respectively. He died barely two years later, and was buried at West Terrace Cemetery.

== Family ==
=== Children of Rev. Ephraim Evans (1825–1863) ===
With Mary Ann Evans, née Wilton (1830 – 1 January 1858):

- Mary Ann "Pollie" Evans (12 February 1855 – 9 February 1937), born at Reedy Creek, Tungkillo near Angaston, later living at Tarcowie. She married farmer Joseph W. Lines (died 1936) in 1882. They had eight children and many present-day descendants.
- Ephraim Ebenezer "Ebby" Evans (17 April 1856 – 21 October 1930), draper, of Tarcowie, Queenstown, then Fremantle and Mosman, New South Wales. He married Rachel Drake on 1 October 1881. Attempted suicide, divorced, and died intestate.

With Matilda Jane Evans, née Congreve, (27 August 1827 – 22 October 1886):

- Henry "Harry" Congreve Evans (10 December 1860 – 9 January 1899) subject of this article
- William James "Will" Evans (17 June 1862 – 22 September 1904) was born in Angas Park, educated at Angaston and North Adelaide; was theatre and music critic for The Advertiser, and also conducted the "From Day to Day" column in The Express, and the "From Week to Week" column in The Chronicle. He was author of Rhymes without Reason.

Neither of the two younger sons married; they lived with their mother until she died, then boarded on South Terrace, Adelaide with J. Le M. F. Roberts (1843–1910), his daughter Edith, and his wife Lizzie Marian Roberts, née Gleeson ( –1911), the latter being described as "nurse, mentor, and friend, ... truly a second mother". Edith Roberts was an accomplished dancer who took part in Immomeena and other of Harry Evans's stage works.

=== Children of Henry Congreve (1793–1852) ===
With his first wife Lucy, née Hoppe (1798–1823):

- George Thomas Congreve (1821 – 14 March 1898) medical man who grew quite wealthy; never left England. Wrote books New Era in Medical Science on consumption (tuberculosis), and The Nursery Gem on early childhood.

With Elizabeth Ann Congreve née Jacob (she died 1852 at sea; he died 18 December 1852):

- Matilda Jane Congreve (27 August 1827 – 22 October 1886) married Rev. Ephraim Evans (1825–1863) on 16 February 1860; their children were:

- Henry "Harry" Congreve Evans (10 December 1860 – 9 January 1899), subject of this article
- William James "Will" Evans (17 June 1862 – 22 September 1904), some biographical details above

- Henry John "Harry" Congreve (31 March 1829 – 10 July 1918) arrived South Australia on the Trafalgar 17 January 1849, married Jane Marshall Kirkwood on 14 December 1865, lived at "Stretton", Walkerville Road (now Stephen Terrace, Walkerville), which became a second home to his siblings.
- Emily Congreve (1830 – 28 September 1896) arrived 1852; wrote (as "Little Jacob") Colonial Pen Scratchings
- William Congreve (1832 – 20 July 1907) arrived South Australia 17 January 1849 with brother Henry; taught in SA and Victoria, retired to Bridgewater, died at "Stretton", Walkerville Road, St. Peters.
- Frederick Jacob Congreve (1837 – 16 September 1906) arrived with father 1852
- James Congreve (1839 – 10 July 1934) lived in Sydney, died in Brisbane.
