= The Murray Valley Standard =

Newspaper in South Australia

- Type: Biweekly newspaper
- Owner(s): Australian Community Media
- Founded: 1934
- Language: English
- City: Murray Bridge, South Australia
- Website: murrayvalleystandard.com.au

The Murray Valley Standard is a bi-weekly newspaper published in Murray Bridge, South Australia, founded in late 1934 and published continuously since then. Its main office is on Adelaide Road, Murray Bridge. It was later sold to Rural Press, previously owned by Fairfax Media, but now an Australian media company trading as Australian Community Media.

== History ==
Murray Bridge's oldest locally produced newspaper, The Murray Valley Standard, was first published in Murray Bridge on 23 November 1934. Its main rival at the time was the Murray Bridge Advertiser (a sub-publication of the Mount Barker Courier), which soon sold its local rights to Maurice Parish. From 21 December 1934, the subtitle changed to "With which is incorporated 'The Murray Bridge advertiser' and 'The Mannum mercury'. From 5 June 1942 the words 'Murray Bridge advertiser' were omitted from the masthead, and from 6 June 1958 'The Mannum mercury' was also omitted from the sub-title.

Its first owner was former Liberal M.P. and Murray Bridge's first mayor, Maurice Parish, who purchased the printing business of Bert Lawrie in 1934. In 1950 Parish sold the newspaper and printing business to his editor, Frank Hambidge. In 1967, Hambidge retired, handing over management to his son Michael Hambidge, and the Standard became the first South Australian country newspaper printed by the Web-Offset method. By 1955, 2500 copies of the Standard were being printed weekly, and circulation was up to 7,450 in 1971. Rural Press first bought shares in the newspaper in 1986, assuming full control in December 1994, and was itself purchased by Fairfax Media in 2007.

=== Southern Review (supplement) ===
The Southern Review (12 May 1972 – 23 March 1973) was a short-lived supplement (only 20 issues were released) that was printed in Murray Bridge for five country newspapers, namely: The Islander, Murray Valley Standard, Pinnaroo & Border Times, Southern Argus, and Victor Harbour Times.

== Distribution ==
The Murray Valley Standard distribution covers an area of over 28,000 km^{2}, from Meningie, Swan Reach, Mannum. Tintinara, Callington. Lameroo, Kanmantoo, and Karoonda. It has a claimed weekly readership of 7,100. Originally weekly, the Standard published twice-weekly in 1973, and has published on Tuesdays and Thursdays since 1981. As with other Rural Press publications, an online version of the paper is available too.
