= Yorick Club (Melbourne) =

Former gentleman's club in Melbourne, Victoria, Australia

The Yorick Club was a gentlemen's club in Melbourne, Australia, whose membership consisted originally of men involved in the arts and sciences. It was founded in 1868 and continued in some form into the 1950s and perhaps beyond.

== History ==
The club began with a series of informal meetings in 1868 held at the office of Frederick William Haddon in Spring Street, Melbourne. Among its earliest members were Marcus Clarke and Hamilton MacKinnon (his literary executor), Adam Lindsay Gordon, James E. Neild, John Shillinglaw and George Arthur Walstab (1834–1909), author of Looking Back (1864), Julian Thomas ("The Vagabond"), barrister William McKinley, journalist Malcolm Stark, and James Duerdin, who served as secretary. Another who served as secretary was Henry Rusden.

Later members included Henry Kendall, George Gordon McCrae, editor Edward Thomas Fricker and the poet Patrick Moloney (1843–1904).

It originally met at King's Cafe in Collins Street, then established clubrooms in the same street above Haigh's tailor's shop, and within a year its membership had grown to 100. The club, which started as a lively, boisterous affair, developed into a respectable institution and expanded its criteria to admit men in the professions. For many years it had rooms at the Victoria Buildings, adjacent the City Club Hotel on the corner of Collins and Swanston Street. In 1966 the club merged with the Melbourne Savage Club, with which it had had a cordial rivalry for some years.

A "Yorick Club" of amateur thespians was formed in Adelaide in 1883, which produced a few stage plays at the Academy of Music in Rundle Street and Garner's Theatre, and toured major country towns, but failed to thrive. Performers included J. H. Leonard and H. J. Woodhouse.

No connection with the Yorick Club founded in Lowell, Massachusetts in 1882, and which survived for nearly a century, has been found.

== Bibliography ==
- Thomas Carrington The Yorick Club: Its Origin and Development May 1868 to December 1910
- Hugh McCrae My Father and My Father's Friends
