= William Sowden =

William Sowden may refer to:

- William Henry Sowden (1840–1907), U.S. Representative from Pennsylvania
- William John Sowden (1858–1943), Australian journalist
