= E. T. Fricker =

Edward Thomas Fricker (17 December 1858 – 4 April 1917) was editor of The Australasian magazine from 1903 to 1917.

== Biography ==
Fricker by David Low

He was born in London, a son of William Henry Fricker and cousin of Sir Hereward Wake, Bart., (1852–1916). He was educated at Margate, and at first worked for an uncle who had an architect's practice in London. He left England in the 1870s for Australia, working in Adelaide and Melbourne, and in the early 1880s left for New Zealand, where he turned to journalism, working as a reporter with the Otago Daily Times, Dunedin. In 1888 he returned to Melbourne, having been invited to join the staff of The Argus, first as parliamentary reporter, then progressed to leader writer and theatre critic of which subject, as with literature, he had considerable knowledge. In July 1903 he filled the editor's chair, which had become vacant, but continued writing the "Topic of the Week" column and "Comments on the War", which benefited from his singular knowledge of European history and geography.

He had been ailing for months before his death, but the rapidity with which he succumbed surprised everyone. His remains were interred at the Box Hill Cemetery.

He was a member of the Melbourne Yorick Club, and was married to Emily M. Fricker with two daughters. A son, Austen Cousens Fricker, was born in Dunedin around September 1888 and died 25 August 1958. He enlisted with the First AIF in November 1914 and served at Gallipoli.

They had a home "Roma", at Morris (Morrice?) street, Caulfield.

== A tribute ==
He made a host of friends while in the chair at the "Australasian", and always maintained the dignity of that historic journal. It is a matter for regret that most of his writing was for the day, and that he left no record in volume form, for he had a wide knowledge and a clear method of expression.
