= Matilda Jane Evans =

Australian novelist (1827–1886)

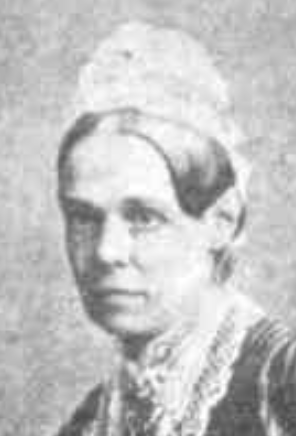
- Born: Matilda Jane Congreve; 7 August 1827; Surrey, England
- Died: 22 October 1886 (aged 59); Prospect, South Australia
- Other name: Maud Jeanne Franc
- Occupation: Novelist
- Spouse: Ephraim Evans (m. 1860; died 1863)
- Children: Harry Congreve Evans; William James Evans

Henrietta Matilda Jane Evans (née Congreve; 7 August 1827 – 22 October 1886) was an English-born Australian novelist who wrote under the pseudonym Maud Jeanne Franc. Evans moved to South Australia with her family in 1852, and was soon left responsible for her three younger siblings after the death of her parents. She began working as a governess and eventually opened her own school in Mount Barker. In 1860, she married a Baptist preacher with whom she had two sons. After her husband's death in 1863, she again began operating her own school, before retiring in 1882 to dedicate herself to her writing and to her work as a Baptist deaconess.

Evans wrote 14 novels over the course of her career, as well as various articles, poems, and short stories. Her writing largely consisted of domestic novels that emphasised moral and religious themes. Her novels, many of which were set in the Australian bush, were popular among young readers and each saw multiple editions printed in London. Her writing emphasised the importance of domesticity and moral conduct, particularly from young women, in civilising the Australian colonies.

== Life ==
Matilda Jane Evans was born on 7 August 1827 in Peckham, Surrey, England, into a middle-class family. She was the daughter of oil worker and the Baptist deacon Henry Congreve and his wife Elizabeth Ann (née Jacob). In 1852, after her father lost much of his wealth in a failed investment scheme, the family moved to South Australia. Evans's mother died on the journey, and her father died shortly after their arrival in Adelaide.

Evans took up a position as a governess to support her younger siblings: Emily and her two younger brothers. She eventually opened her own school in Mount Barker, where she wrote her first novel: Marian; or The Light of Some One's Home. The novel was published in 1859 by the Baptist printer Arthur Waddy in a series of instalments, and was later printed in London.

Matilda Jane married the Baptist preacher Ephraim Evans on 16 February 1860. He died just three years later, leaving Matilda Jane and his four children (two from a previous marriage and two of her own sons) with little money with which to support themselves. Matilda Jane raised funds from the public to open a school in Nuriootpa and later opened a ladies' school in Angaston.

Evans retired from teaching in 1882 and began writing and serving as a deaconess at the North Adelaide Baptist Church full-time. She died of peritonitis in Prospect on 22 October 1886. Her sons, Harry Congreve and William James, both became journalists and inherited her estate.

== Writing and reception ==
Evans wrote 14 novels under the pseudonym "Maud Jeanne Franc", as well as articles and short stories published in newspapers. She contributed poems, short stories, and editorials to the Melbourne-based Baptist journal The Australian Evangelist, in which several of her novels also first appeared as serials. A posthumous edition of her Australian stories was published in London in 1888. Her novels were all eventually published in London by Sampson Low & Co, and many saw several editions. Evans's writing primarily consisted of domestic novels featuring religious and temperance themes, which were often set in the Australian bush. Her novels were primarily intended for young people and were often distributed as prizes to students at Sunday schools. Evans's novels continued to be reprinted and serialised until the 1920s, and were popular in schools.

The historian Margaret Allen describes Evans's work as the first substantial body of fiction written in South Australia. To Allen, Evans's novels were written to show that women could play an important role in turning the rough and wild colonies into morally upright and religious communities. In her best-known novel, Marian; or, the Light of Some One's Home, a governess is tasked with turning a "young, wild colonial girl" into a respectable young woman. Evans's novels express the importance of maintaining social standards and properly educating young women within the colonial context, and draw on common tropes of colonial fiction, including tension between the uncivilised setting and the characters' duty and respectability. Susan K. Martin argues that Evans's novels often feature heroines who subvert conventional romantic storylines by acting assertively to achieve their aim of a moral and domesticated colonial society. For instance, several of Evans's heroines refuse to marry until their love interests conform to their expectations of domestic and spiritual life. To Martin, Evans's heroines display "domestic behaviour [that] pushes the limits of acceptable femininity" by insisting on domesticity and acting as fervent advocates of the temperance cause.

Allen notes that Aboriginal Australians are largely absent from Evans's writing. She argues that Evans's work had political implications, and that by portraying South Australia as a settled colony, the novels helped to reinforce the idea of terra nullius (the idea that the land belonged to no one prior to British colonisation). Allen points out that while Aboriginal Australians are largely absent from Evans's writing, her novel Golden Gifts presents Aboriginal Australians as less-than-human and as curiosities who exist outside of European civilisation. Martin writes that Evans's novels draw a link between colonial settlement and domesticity. She frequently uses the cultivation of home gardens as a metaphor for domesticity and the growth of Christianity in the colonies, and suggests that colonial women's proper management of their homes is essential to maintaining civilisation.

== Bibliography ==
- Marian; or The Light of Some One's Home (1860; second edition 1861)
- Vermont Vale (1866)
- Emily's Choice (1867)
- Minnie's Mission: an Australian Temperance Tale (1869)
- Golden Gifts (1869)
- Silken Cords and Iron Fetters (1870)
- John's Wife (1874)
- Hall's Vineyard (1875)
- Little Mercy (1878)
- Beatrice Melton's Discipline (1880)
- The Master of Ralston (1880)
- Jem's Hopes and What They Grew To (1881)
- No Longer a Child (1882)
- Two Sides to Every Question (1883)
- At the Well (1883)
- Into the Light (1885)
- Fern Hollow; or, Old Life in New Lands (1885)
