= Bank Place =

Street in Melbourne, Victoria

Coordinates: 37.81661°S 144.96043°E

Bank Place Victoria
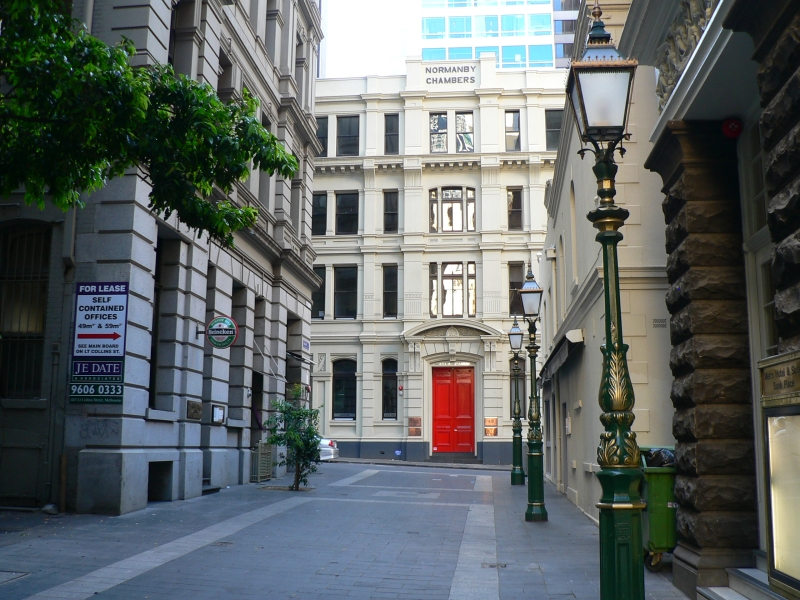
- Bank Place looking north toward Little Collins Street and Normanby Chambers

General information
- Type: Street
- Location: Melbourne
- Length: 100 m (300 ft)

Major junctions
- North end: Little Collins Street
- Roeszler Lane; Mitre Lane
- South end: Collins Street

Bank Place is a street in the Melbourne central business district, Australia. It is a laneway running roughly north-south between Collins Street and Little Collins Street.

Located in the heart of the financial sector, Bank Place features many pre-war buildings dating from the 1860s to the 1920s. The precinct is subject to heritage restrictions and is listed on the Victorian Heritage Register.

Bank Place is home to several bars, cafes, and eateries that serve many of the nearby office workers. Many of the taller heritage buildings have been converted into loft style apartments. The lane also includes several ornate heritage lampposts and bluestone alleys.

== Heritage Buildings ==
Several buildings in the precinct are heritage listed on both the Victorian Heritage Register and also by the National Trust of Australia due to their historic and architectural importance.

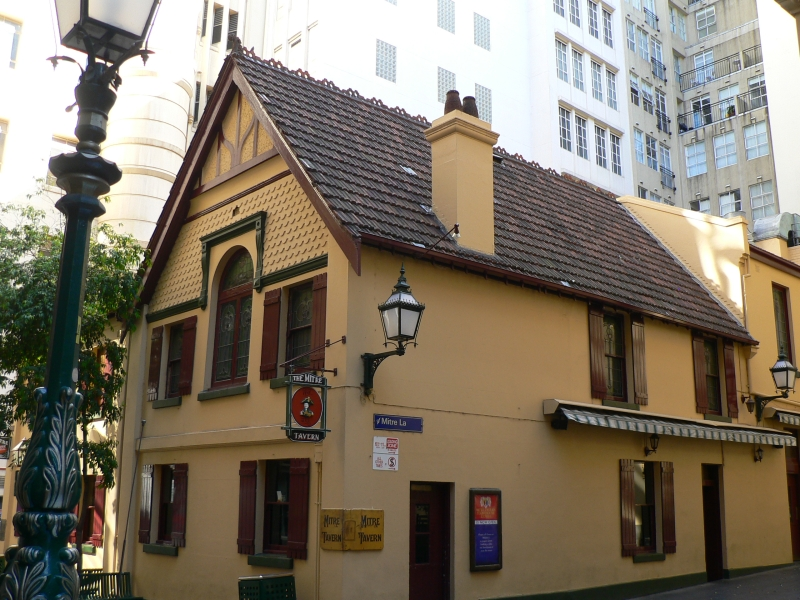
Mitre Tavern and Mitre Lane

=== Mitre Tavern ===
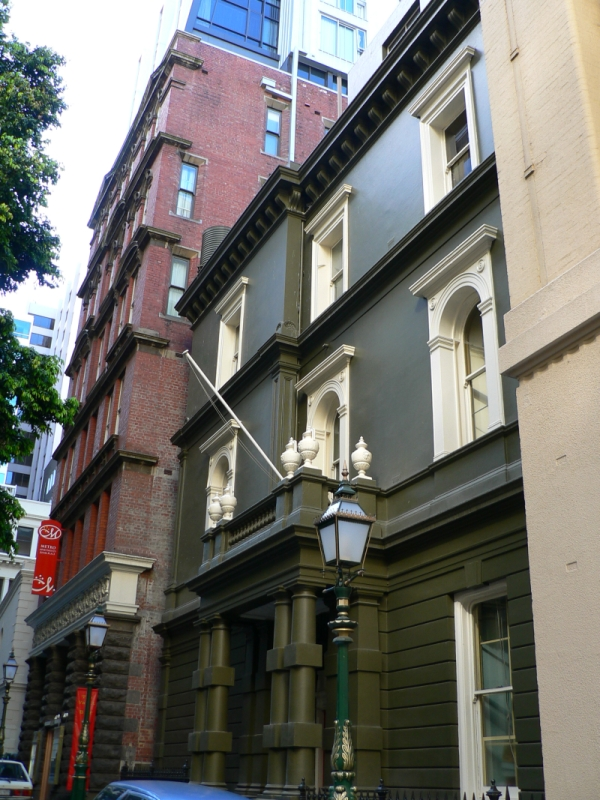
Savage Club building, Melbourne

The Mitre Tavern is a historic pub established in 1868 and remodelled in the Queen Anne style between 1900 and 1910. Mitre Tavern was a popular 'bohemian' hangout for many of Australia's most prominent artists of the early twentieth century, alongside the neighbouring Savage Club. It is recognised by the National Trust of Australia.

=== Melbourne Savage Club ===
The current Melbourne Savage Club premises, located at 12-16 Bank Place, were built in 1884-85 for Australia's first baronet Sir William Clarke. His son, Sir Rupert Clarke's mistress Connie Waugh is said to have lived there. The Savage Club purchased the building in 1923.

=== Stalbridge Chambers ===
Located at the corner of Little Collins Street, Stalbridge Chambers was built from 1890-1891. It was built by R C Brown to the design of architects Twentyman & Askew. Brown was the president of the Buildings and Contractors' Association, and his company was responsible for its construction.

=== Bank House ===
Located at 11-19 Bank Place Melbourne, Bank House was built for businessman Charles Victor Robertson in 1903 in order to house his Hemingway Robertson Institute. An additional two floors were added in 1925-1926.

=== Charter House ===
Charter house is a five-storey brick office building, built in 1907 and very similar in style to Bank House. It is a significant element in the Bank Place precinct.

=== Normanby Chambers ===
Normanby Chambers is a four-storey office building constructed in 1883 for a Mr M H Davies. It is a good example of the medium-rise office buildings constructed in the mercantile and financial sectors of Melbourne at the time of construction.
