= Port Adelaide News =

Australian newspaper

The Port Adelaide News was a newspaper published in Port Adelaide, South Australia between 1876 and 1933 with various sub-titles, several breaks in publication and periods of bi-weekly publication.

== History ==
The Port Adelaide News was founded by the Port Adelaide Newspaper and Printing Company, established in March 1878 with directors D. Bower, R. Honey, J. C. Lovely, Theodore Hack, and G. R. Selth. The position of secretary and first editor was assigned to David Wylie Scott, ". . . as true a gentleman as ever walked, but no journalist". He had little time in the chair, as in September 1878 E. H. Derrington (1830–1899), founder of the Yorke's Peninsula Advertiser, acquired the Port Adelaide News, and was its owner-editor until 1883. From 1882 Derrington also owned Adelaide Punch. He notoriously published in all three papers advertisements for Victorian sweepstakes.

John Archibald Adey was appointed editor by Derrington.

Sir William Sowden worked at the Yorke's Peninsula Advertiser, then was manager of the Port Adelaide News from 1879.

George Liversage Barrow (1851–1925), son of J. H. Barrow who founded The Advertiser, was sub-editor around 1882.

The paper was from the start printed by Frederick Wallage Kennedy, and when Derrington retired the Port Adelaide News was taken over by Kennedy, J. S. Jones and J. J. Styles, though characterized as a commercial rather than a journalistic venture.

The title was revived once again in 1913, printed and published by John Ernest Trotman, of Lipson-street, Port Adelaide.

== Some people ==
David Wylie Scott (March 1833 – 2 December 1887), the first editor, was born in Liverpool, the second son of William Scott, and arrived in South Australia aboard Canton with his parents in April 1838. After schooling at Tranmere School, Magill, he worked for his father at Port Adelaide before farming near Williamstown, and was for several years chairman of the Mount Crawford district council. By 1865 he was in Port Adelaide, partner of Joshua Little in business as customs and commission agents. He was a frequent writer of "Letters to the Editor" and not afraid to contradict Science: he suggested the rings of Saturn were an optical illusion resulting from that planet's rapid rotation. After the newspaper was sold to Derrington, Scott went back to farming, this time at Belalie. In later years he had a property at Montacute, where he busied himself in prospecting for minerals.

Scott was a creationist, the author of Some of the Fallacies of Geology Exposed (1863), a booklet of 37 pages published by Rigby Ltd., and had little sympathy for the working class, the authors of their own poverty. He was promulgating the same philosophies in his last years. He died at the home of his brother at Burnside. W. D. Scott of Avenue Road, North Adelaide, Master of the Supreme Court, was a brother. He was married with one daughter.

Frederick Wallage Kennedy (c. 1849 – 5 January 1908) was a son of Capt. T. Kennedy, of the 96th Highlanders, and stepson of Dr Mortimer, of Port Adelaide. He was a printer by trade, producing the Port Adelaide News for the owners, the Port Adelaide Newspaper Company and its successor E. H. Derrington, then with J. S. Jones and Mr. J. J. Styles purchased the business. He was mayor of Semaphore 1889–1891. He was married to Mary Catherine Kennedy (c. 1850 – 8 April 1930) and lived on High Street, Burnside; they had two sons: Harry, a musician who won the 1894 Elder Overseas Scholarship, and Edward "Ted" Kennedy.

John Archibald Adey ( – c. 20 August 1913) was the youngest son of Charles George Adey, of Redhill, South Australia, and after leaving school joined the Adelaide Advertiser as a junior reporter. He became editor of the Port Adelaide News, then left for Kalgoorlie, Western Australia for a position on the Kalgoorlie Miner. He returned to Adelaide to act as editor of the Labor weekly paper. Subsequently, he worked for other newspapers in Melbourne and New Zealand, then returned to Adelaide, and the Advertiser. In 1908 he again headed west to join the staff of The West Australian and in 1910 was sent to Britain to act as their London correspondent. He also had a position with the W.A. Agent-General, writing articles for English journals about their State. He had been in excellent health, but died after an operation for broncho-phlebitis. Adey married Mayfield, of Willunga, who died around 1910. Their daughter was brought up by Mrs Adey's sister at Bald Hills, South Australia. William James Adey, headmaster of Adelaide High School and Director of Education, was a brother.

== Digitisation ==
The following issues have been digitised from photographic copies by the National Library of Australia and may be retrieved with Trove.

- Port Adelaide Post Shipping Gazette, Farmers and Commercial Register (1876)
- Port Adelaide News and Commercial and Shipping Gazette (Issues from Vol.I No.1 of 30 March 1878 to Vol.I No.29 of 12 October 1878.)
- Port Adelaide News (Issues Vol.I No.30 of 19 October 1878 to Vol.VI No.452 of 7 December 1883)
- Port Adelaide News and Lefevre's Peninsula Advertiser (Issues Vol.VI No. 453 of 11 December 1883 to Vol.XX No.1210 of 15 January 1897)
- Port Adelaide News (Issues Vol.I No.I (new issue) of 9 January 1904 to Vol.I No.XXXIX of 1 October 1904)
- Port Adelaide News (Issues Vol.1, No.1 of 15 August 1913 to Vol.19 No.46 of 27 January 1933)
