= George L. Barrow =

Australian journalist (1851–1925)

George Liversage (Note: The proper spelling of his middle name is contentious. His mother was born "Liversedge", but most references have "Liversage".) Barrow (May 1851 – 11 August 1925) was an Australian journalist.

== Biography ==
Barrow was the son of John Henry Barrow and Sarah Barrow née Liversedge (c. 1814 – 4 October 1856). He was born in Bradford, England, in May 1851 and emigrated to Australia with his parents and three siblings in September 1853.

He studied at J. L. Young's Adelaide Educational Institution, then worked on government survey parties before beginning his career in journalism. Around 1882 he took over a sub-editorial chair of the Port Adelaide News, where he worked alongside John Deslandes, James Haddy, Rev. J. C. Kirby and A. T. Saunders. He was noted as a staunch protectionist, an admirer of Graham Berry, and for writing forcefully against what he considered to be government scandals.

After some friction at the Port Adelaide News, Barrow left and started his own paper, which shortly merged with Charles McMullen's South Australian Times for which Barrow served as editor. He was convicted of criminal libel for a comment in the issue of 11 July 1885 accusing Samuel Tomkinson of corruption in respect of his support of a projected railway between Port Augusta and Phillip Ponds, near Woomera. He was incarcerated for some months in the Adelaide Gaol. The railway never went ahead.

On his release from jail he moved to Oakleigh, Victoria, where his brother John T. Barrow was in business. Melbourne was experiencing a land boom, and he worked for a year or two as a land agent. He then established The Oakleigh and Fern Tree Gully Times, and closely associated himself with the interests of the district. In 1891 he returned to Adelaide and The News.

Around 1894 he moved to Western Australia, where he stayed for a few years.

From around 1908 he lived in Fiji. There he was active politically, frequently criticising the government for its shortcomings as he saw them, particularly in its relations with the native population. He published several pamphlets about these faults. In 1923 he was a candidate for election to Fiji's Legislative Council. In his last years he lived alone in a remote area of Fiji, not far from the residence of his niece, and died in either Nadroga or Nausori.

The Chronicle newspaper commented after his death:

Mr. Barrow was a well read and very capable man; and also a clever and trenchant writer. Never lacking in courage, he was prepared at any cost to fight for what he believed to be right. His uncompromising nature made it rather difficult sometimes to work with him, but, even when his advanced views could not be endorsed, his friends admired his independence and sterling character. It could hardly be otherwise, seeing that he was absolutely unselfish, and that he lived with no other object than to serve his fellow-man.
