= Julian Thomas (journalist) =

Australian writer (1843–1896)

- Born: 15 November 1843; Walsall, Staffordshire, England
- Died: 4 September 1896 (aged 52)
- Writing career
- Pen name: The Vagabond
- Genre: journalism

Julian Thomas, LL.D. (also known as "The Vagabond"), born John Stanley James, (15 November 1843 – 4 September 1896) was an English-born Australian journalist and author.

Born John Stanley James in Walsall, Staffordshire, England, the only son of Joseph Green James (attorney) and his wife Elizabeth, he changed his name to Julian Thomas around 1872 and went to the United States. Thomas took to journalism on the conclusion of the Civil War, and was attached to papers in New York and San Francisco. He was in France during the Franco-German war, and afterwards visited South America, Tahiti, and Hawaii.

Thomas went to Australia in 1874, settling in Melbourne. There he commenced the “Vagabond" papers, a series of articles or exposes of public institutions, that appeared in the Melbourne Argus. These created a sensation and were subsequently republished in book form.

In 1877, he went to the newly discovered gold fields in Northern Queensland, and in the following year proceeded to New Caledonia as war correspondent during the native revolt. He was for some months with the French troops attached to the expedition of Henri Rivière, afterwards killed in Tonkin; and visited the Isle of Pines, being the only journalist ever allowed to land there.

In 1879, he again travelled through Northern and Central Queensland. On his return he went to the Fiji Islands, and spent some months in that group; and in 1880 visited China, Japan, and British Columbia, returning to Australia in 1882. In that and the following year, he spent a long time in the South Pacific, visiting New Caledonia, the New Hebrides, the Solomon Islands, and New Guinea, where he commanded the expedition sent out by the Argus proprietary. The "Vagabond" was the first to call attention in the press to French and German aggressions in the South Seas.

In 1886, he was special correspondent of the Melbourne Argus at the Colonial and Indian Exhibition at South Kensington. In 1887, he revisited New Caledonia and the New Hebrides, on behalf of the Melbourne Age. He revisited England in 1888, and in 1889 went to Tonga and Samoa for the Age, saw the return of the deposed king Malietoa Laupepa at the latter place, and witnessed the troubles in Tonga.

He is author of "Vagabond Papers" (five series), "Occident and Orient", "Cannibals and Convicts", and several plays, of which No Mercy is the best known. The "Vagabond" claimed to have travelled more extensively over Australia and New Zealand than any living journalist at the time.

In 1891–92, he acted as secretary to the Royal Commission on Charities appointed by the Victorian Government.

Thomas was a member of Melbourne's Yorick Club in its Bohemian days. He continued to write articles infrequently, mostly for the Melbourne Leader, until dying in Fitzroy on 4 September 1896.
