= Ebenezer Ward =

Australian politician and journalist

The Honourable Ebenezer Ward
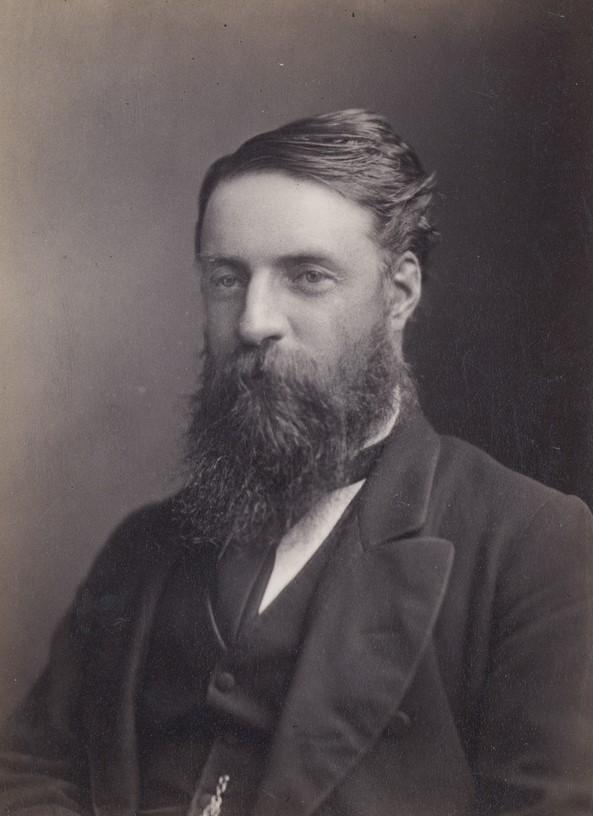

Member of the South Australian House of Assembly for Gumeracha
- In office 1870–1880 Serving with: Arthur Blyth (1870–1875); Frederick Hannaford (1875–1878); William Haines (1878–1880)

Member of the South Australian House of Assembly for Burra
- In office 1881–1884 Serving with Ben Rounsevell

Member of the South Australian House of Assembly for Frome
- In office 1884–1890 Serving with: William Copley (1884–1887); Clement Giles (1887–1890)

Member of the South Australian Legislative Council for Northern District
- In office 1891–1900

Minister for Agriculture and Education
- In office 1875–1877

Personal details
- Born: 4 September 1837 Mersey Island, Essex, England
- Died: 8 October 1917 (aged 80) Perth, Western Australia
- Resting place: Karrakatta Cemetery
- Spouses: Matilda Ann Simmons (m. 1861; div. 1870) Lucy Johnson (m. 1870; sep. 1893)
- Children: two sons from first marriage, four sons and five daughters from second marriage
- Occupation: Journalist
- Known for: Accidentally giving women the right to stand for parliament

Ebenezer Ward (4 September 1837 – 8 October 1917) was an Australian politician and journalist. He was a member of the South Australian House of Assembly from 1870 to 1880, and from 1881 to 1890, representing Gumeracha (1870–1880), Burra (1881–1884) and Frome (1884–1890). In 1890, he switched to the South Australian Legislative Council, where he represented Northern District until 1900. He was Minister for Agriculture and Education under James Boucaut from 1875 to 1876, and under John Colton from 1876 to 1877.

As a journalist, Ward variously worked for the Morning Post in England; in Melbourne, for The Herald and Bell's Life in Victoria and Sporting Chronicle, and The Age; and, in Adelaide, for The Advertiser and the Daily Telegraph, where he served a stint as editor. He subsequently established a series of regional newspapers: Southern Argus in Port Elliot, the City and Country, the Northern Argus in Clare, a newspaper at Gumeracha, and The Farmers' Messenger.

== History ==
Ebenezer Ward was born the eldest son of the Rev. Joseph Ward, a member of an old English family, at Russalls, Mersey Island, Essex. He was educated at Dumpton Hall, a school established for the sons of Baptist ministers, near Ramsgate, Kent. It was intended that he join the ministry, but in 1849, he rebelled and decamped for London. He found work as a copy boy at a large printing office in Lincoln's Inn Fields. It was during his short stay there, that Ward acquired his appreciation of Shakespeare while checking proof sheets, which they were printing for Routledge. He next worked for the Morning Post as a reader's boy at 15/ a week. He was promoted to reader, then reviser, and eventually a member of their reporting staff in the gallery of the House of Commons and became proficient in shorthand. He won the confidence of his employers, and at age eighteen he was working with the proprietor's son, Algernon Borthwick, with whom he maintained a long correspondence. Ward left the Morning Post in 1856, after inheriting some money, and returned to Essex for three years, living the life of a country squire.

In 1859, Ward migrated to Australia in the clipper The British Trident, (among fellow-passengers were South Australian pastoralist Peter Waite and Sir Frederick Pottinger). On arrival in Melbourne in June 1859, he was recruited by George Collins Levey initially as a reader then parliamentary reporter for The Herald. He then worked on a Government contract collecting agricultural statistics in the Victorian interior. While touring the Victoria's important farming centres, he contributed his observations in The Herald and its associated sporting and agricultural journal, Bell's Life. It was also during this time, that he was first urged to stand for Parliament.

In 1860, Ward holidayed in Adelaide with G. V. Brooke, the famous tragedian, and on returning to Melbourne, he joined The Age. The following year, he was offered and accepted the leadership of the Hansard staff of The Advertiser in Adelaide (the incumbent, R. S. Smythe, was leaving to become a theatrical entrepreneur and recommended Ward as his successor), commencing in June 1861. His first task was to report the budget speech of the Hon. Thomas Reynolds, hence, reputation as a stenographer was secured.

While with The Advertiser, he visited and described the orchards and vineyards of South Australia. His articles were reprinted in pamphlet form, and 2000 copies were purchased by the Government for free distribution at the Great Exhibition in London in 1862. He returned to Victoria the next year to write a series of articles for The Age.

Two years later, Ward joined Frederick Sinnett's Telegraph as associate editor.

In 1864, following passage of the Northern Territory Settlers Act, he was appointed by the South Australian Government as clerk-in-charge, accountant and postmaster of Boyle Travers Finniss's expedition to colonise the Northern Territory. While the expedition was being organised he visited Melbourne and rejoined the Age staff, contributing special articles on the vineyards of Victoria. Finniss's party sailed in April 1864, but broke up in a flurry of jealousies, vindictiveness and personal recriminations and Ward was one of those who returned to Adelaide in January 1865 after being dismissed by Finniss for insubordination. Finniss promoted his 18-year-old son Frederick to take over much of Ward's responsibilities. Ward rejoined the Telegraph as editor, but was soon given the ultimatum of either discontinuing his Hansard work or leaving the Telegraph. He chose the latter, and continued with Hansard until 1868.

In 1865, he established the Southern Argus in Port Elliot, soon to move to Strathalbyn. Six months later, he rejoined the Telegraph and took up his old position as a Government shorthand writer.

He founded several more newspapers during the next ten years, some of them being: the City and Country, the Northern Argus in Clare and he once had a paper at Gumeracha. He also owned The Farmers' Messenger, which according to reports either failed to attract a readership or was very popular with farmers.

== Politics ==
In 1868, he issued his first address to the electors of Gumeracha, and after a fierce contest was defeated by 22 votes. Two years later he tried again, this time in opposition to Arthur Blyth and A. G. Downer and on 5 April 1870, was returned by a substantial majority, secured 343 of 512 votes, and in 1872, 1875, and 1878 he headed the poll for that district. He quickly made his mark as an eloquent speaker and succeeded in pushing a number of important matters, including the opening up of railway communication with Victoria.

In 1875, Ward was elevated to Cabinet. He was the first Minister of Agriculture in South Australia, if not in Australia, and Minister of Education under two Premiers (Boucaut and Colton). It has been suggested that this was a ploy to keep his attention away from land reform. In 1880, he resigned from his seat as an undischarged bankrupt, but in 1881, was elected for the Burra district with the Hon. W. B. Rounsevell.

After the subdivision of the Burra electorate in 1884, the Frome district returned Ward at the head of the poll, and he was elected Chairman of Committees and Deputy speaker, where his superlative knowledge of Standing Orders and parliamentary procedure came to the fore. In 1887, the electors of Frome once more placed him in the leading position but he lost it in the elections of 1891. The following year he was elected to the Legislative Council by the Northern district, which extended from southern Yorke Peninsula to Port Darwin and across to the Western Australian border. He lost this seat in 1900, after the Labor vote was bolstered by workers in the newly established smelter at Port Pirie.

An outspoken opponent of women's suffrage, he attempted to block the Constitutional Amendment (Adult Suffrage) Act 1894 giving women the vote by proposing an amendment that would also allow women to stand for election, assuming that male members of parliament would not want women replacing them. However the bill passed with this amendment and South Australia became the first legislature in the world to grant women the rights to both vote and stand for election.

=== Achievements ===
Ward's political achievements include the stoppage of the sale of Crown Lands for cash in 1870 and 1871, and the throwing open of the lands on credit selections.

As Minister in the Boucaut Government Ward introduced the Education Act of 1875, which had been drafted by J. P. Boucaut and Sir Samuel Way, who was then Attorney-General.

Ward established experimental farms at Mannahill and Mount Muirhead near Millicent. Abolition of imprisonment for debt was the result of his persistent agitation.

In 1877 Ward and Sir Henry Ayers represented the State at the eighth Intercolonial Conference assembled to consider duplication of the telegraph cable between Europe and Australia. He helped delay adoption the Federal Adopting Bill; he was not opposed to Federation, merely the weak model which was finally arrived at.

Ward was an enthusiastic advocate of railways, and was one of the prime movers in establishing railway communication with Melbourne. He helped get the railway to Mount Gambier built, and the only one he ever opposed was that to Port Broughton. He was also a proponent of a transcontinental railway line to Perth, and was noted for a four-hour speech advocating this and other major national works as well as free trade between the states of Australia.

== Other interests ==
Ward was active in amateur theatricals in his younger days. In 1860 he had accompanied the great actor G. V. Brooke, to Adelaide where he was engaged in a production of Hamlet. Ward was persuaded to take, under the pseudonym Edward Ewart, the part of Rosencrantz. Alas, at his cue to speak, he was struck dumb with stagefright and had to suffer the displeasure of the audience. There was no such problem in later performances and he later played Lord Stanley to Brooke's Richard III.

After settling in Adelaide he frequently appeared at the old Victoria Theatre in aid of public charities. Characters he played include Claude Melnotte in The Lady of Lyons. He frequently appeared at the Theatre Royal; on one occasion in aid of an early incarnation of the S.A. Jockey Club, raising nearly £200 in a production of Sheridan Knowles's The Hunchback. Among other parts he played were Leonardo Gonzago in The Wife, Reuben Holt, in Westland Marston's A Hard Struggle, Duke Aranza, in The Honeymoon, Sir Harcourt Courtly, in Dion Boucicault's London Assurance and Pygmalion, in Pygmalion and Galatea. He also lectured or assisted at literary entertainments in aid of various country Institutes of South Australia, from Mount Gambier, where he wrote and first delivered his well-known lecture on Shakespeare, to Port Augusta.

For reasons which are unclear, he wrote a patriotic ditty which bears comparison with "Advance Australia Fair" and "Song of Australia":

Sing Australia's song of joy,
Of virgin ecstasy!
United now, she greets the world
Reliant, grateful, free!

Her lands have given homes to all,
The world has gladly found her,
Her sons uphold their fathers' fame!
Her ocean walls surround her.

Australia fears no foreign foe,
She loves her motherland,
She knows her strength, she means the right,
Her grip is heart with hand.

With conscience clear and purpose firm,
No traitor shall betray her;
Brightest of God's great gifts to men,
God bless Australia!

Ward was Secretary of the Agricultural and Horticultural Society of S.A. from 1866 to 1868, and the driving force behind that society's "Grand General Show" 7–9 November 1867 held to coincide with Prince Alfred's visit to the State. He was a strong advocate for the Jubilee Exhibition of 1887.

Ward owned a farm at Parawurlie, Yorke Peninsula, which was characterised by Edwin Derrington's Port Adelaide News as both a speculation with Mr. Fuller and a mansion, a den of luxury and licentiousness.

In 1890 Ward bought a property at Grampus Range, 21 km south of Yunta, 49 km east of Oodla Wirra and 54 km south-west of Mannahill and established a homestead there, with an elderly retainer as caretaker. It figured in the maintenance case his estranged wife laid against him; that it was not a fit place for girls to live.

== Personality ==
Always a keen political student Ward sought legislative honours ... A splendid rhetorician, a capital debater, and a caustic critic, his style of oratory was convincing, his vocabulary extensive, his diction clear cut and polished, his elocution perfect. The analytical faculty had been well developed in the stern school of harsh experience, so that he was keen to discern the weaknesses of an adversary, and quick to combat antagonistic views. Gifted with considerable histrionic power – more than once displayed on the professional stage – and a voice flexible as any actor could desire, it was a treat to hear him in the best years of his life declaim in passionate periods against an existing wrong which required legislative righting. Although he was curiously deficient in humour, his fluent tongue was a mighty influence for his side and as a 'whip of scorpions' to those who would thwart his will. The first fruits of success proved all too sweet, and the great promise of political youth was never properly fulfilled.

== Controversies ==
In 1880 he unsuccessfully sued Edwin Henry Derrington, owner of the Port Adelaide News, Shipping and Commercial Advertiser (or more succinctly Port Adelaide News) and the Yorke's Peninsula Advertiser for libel. The trial lasted six days and kept the newspapers busy with scandalous revelations.

Ward had a series of disputes with the Commissioner of Taxes, in which despite his belligerent rhetoric, he invariably came out the loser. It would be fair to say that The Register had little sympathy for "The Member for Grampus".

== Recognition ==
In 1875 a public movement was initiated to secure the presentation of a testimonial to Mr. Ward "in recognition of his political services to South Australia." Over £500 was raised, and the presentation was made at a representative banquet at Gumeracha.

In 1889 Mr. Ward was permitted "by the gracious permission of her Majesty the Queen" to retain the title of "The Honourable" for life.

== Last years ==
In 1911 Ward moved to Perth, becoming as well known a personality there as in Adelaide. He wrote articles for the Western Australian press and one of his treasured possessions was a railway pass given to him so that he might travel for the purpose of writing about the country, particularly its pastoral and agricultural industries.

Ward died at the Perth General Hospital. He was buried at Karrakatta on 9 October. The chief mourners were Edward J. Ward (son), corporal Ebenezer Ward (grandson), Miss Tillie Ward (granddaughter), Mrs. J. Martin, and Mrs. G. Taylor. The pallbearers were Mr. George Taylor, M.L.A., Major Gollan, and Messrs. A. Carson and Eddy Allen.

== Family ==
Ebenezer Ward was married twice: (1) to Matilda Ann Simmons (c. 1844 – 27 June 1895) on 19 December 1861; they had two sons before being divorced in June 1870. ("Tillie" was the adopted daughter of well-known coachbuilder John Crimp (c. 1819 – 9 May 1902). She later married Frank A. H. Weston, a peddler of quack medicines) and (2) to Lucy Johnson ( – 28 April 1930) of Willaston on 12 December 1870. They had four sons and five daughters and separated around 1893. Their children included:

- John George Pettitt Ward (1 October 1862 – ), a corporal in the A.I.F. in 1917
- Edwin Joseph Ward (10 July 1864 – 10 March 1937) married Elizabeth Galley ( – 5 June 1953), lived at Bridgetown, Western Australia
- Walter Charles Russalls Ward (19 April 1873 – 25 March 1941) married Lottie Holland on 19 February 1895
- H(enry) Torrens Ward (c. 1875 – ), educated at Whinham College, barrister of Adelaide, Mount Gambier and Alice Springs, voluntarily de-registered in 1932
- Arther E(benezer) Ward (c. January 1889 – )
- Leslie N(orman) Ward (29 January 1893 – ) served at Gallipoli then a lieutenant in the Royal Aviation Corps, England. Went missing in France later vigneron of Lyndoch (shot down, crashed, broken leg, captured by Germans, repatriated 1918)
- Ethel Gladys married (1) James Clark, of Grenadier Guards, London on 9 February 1915 (2) Robert Ernest Cussen ( – 3 January 1947) on 3 November 1923

== Bibliography ==
- The vineyards and orchards of South Australia : a descriptive tour : by Ebenezer Ward in 1862 (Limited Edition; 750 copies; Originally published as a series of articles for the Adelaide Advertiser in 1862) Sullivan's Cove 1980 ISBN 0909442126
- The vineyards of Victoria : as visited by Ebenezer Ward in 1864 (Limited Edition; 750 copies; Originally published as a series of articles for The Age, in 1864) Sullivan's Cove, Adelaide 1980 ISBN 0909442134
- The South-Eastern district of South Australia : its resources and requirements : by Ebenezer Ward (Reprinted with emendations and additions from letters written expressly for The South Australian Advertiser and Weekly Chronicle and Mail newspapers) Pub. by the author 1869
