= Charles Richard Wilton =

South Australia newspaper editor

Charles Richard Wilton (25 May 1855 – 8 March 1927) was a journalist in the State of South Australia, a longtime literary editor of The Advertiser and authored, under the pen name of "Autolycus", a long-running weekly column in The Courier of Mount Barker.

== Life ==
He was born in Brunswick, Victoria to John Wilton (ca.1824 – 17 October 1903) and his first wife, his cousin Sarah Nowill Wilton (1815–1862). Richard Wilton, canon of York Cathedral, was an uncle.

He began his working life as an articled clerk in a Melbourne law firm, but left them around 1878 to work as a draughtsman for the Adelaide architectural firm of Woods & McMinn. He had a literary bent, and some years previously had started writing for the Press, and had articles published in the Melbourne Spectator and Daily Telegraph. It seems that he had affinity for printers' ink, for by 1877 he had left architecture to join J. C. F. Johnson, Dan Magill, and W. J. Kennedy, in producing the Adelaide Punch. For a time he replaced George Ash as editor of the Narracoorte Herald, then for eight years edited the Mount Barker Courier. He never lost contact with the people of Mount Barker, and as "Autolycus" (subtitled "A snapper-up of unconsidered trifles"), contributed a weekly column to the Courier for 36 years; right up to the week of his death. He also used this nom de plume for occasional contributions to The Bulletin.

In 1889, he returned to Melbourne, where he edited the Weekly Times, and sub-edited the Daily Telegraph (Melbourne)|Daily Telegraph in place of Joe Melvin. In his spare time he edited Life a popular magazine first appearing in 1904.

In April 1890, he was back in Adelaide as theatre critic and sub-editor of The Advertiser, subsequently leader of the Advertiser and Hansard staff, positions he held until ill-health forced him to retire.

== Other interests ==
Despite his change of career, he retained an interest in architecture and designed a number of buildings in the Mount Barker region, including:

- The Mount Barker Courier's original building
- A residence for John Paltridge (ca.1831–1917), father of Amelia, who married Charles Dumas, founder of the Courier.
- The Bridgeport Hotel, Murray Bridge

== Family ==
He married Annie Isabel Gladstones ( – 5 June 1927) on 3 July 1883. Their children included:

- Professor John Raymond Wilton (2 May 1884 – 1944) married Winifred Aimee Welbourn on 25 May 1936.
- Dr. Alexander Cockburn Wilton MB, BS (22 April 1888 – c. 9 June 1954) of Clarendon was a godson of Sir John Alexander Cockburn.
- Dorothy Kenyon Wilton (1 September 1890 – 1962) married William Albert Smith in 1928.
- Richard Gladstones Wilton (30 October 1892 – 1946), a hydraulic engineer, married Annie Heath on 27 December 1917.

They lived at 42 Hutt Street, Adelaide from around 1900, perhaps earlier, but 100 Hutt Street when he died.

== See also ==
- Hundred of Wilton
