= James C. Leonard =

First Congregationalist Minister of Perth

Rev. James C. (Note: It has not been found for what (if anything) this initial stood. His tombstone omits it entirely.) Leonard BA (1825 – 15 August 1891) was the first Congregationalist minister of Perth, Western Australia. He was headmaster of two private schools in South Australia; near Gawler and at Angaston.

== History ==
Leonard was born in England, a son of John Leonard of Paddington. He was educated at London University, where he qualified BA, and left for Western Australia aboard the emigrant ship Will Watch with his wife and a small family, arriving in February 1852. He preached his first sermon at the Independent church, Perth, on 29 February 1852. His wife Mary Ann Leonard, née Rose (1830 – 14 April 1852) died a few months later. He married again, to Anne Douglas, née Smithers (c. 1815 – 26 April 1908), widow of Captain Harrison Douglas (1818 – 30 June 1852), on 26 April 1854 and without waiting for a replacement (it took four years), moved in 1856 to Bentley, in the hills near Gawler, South Australia, where, on top of his clerical duties, he ran a farm. He left the ministry in 1861 to conduct a school in Bentley; and in 1869 took over E. P. Nesbit's boys' school at Angaston.

== Family ==
A brother, J. H. Leonard, was a professional painter in oils, based in London, and Rev. Leonard assisted him by finding a market for his work in Adelaide. Professor Read, vicar of Mitcham, South Australia, was a brother-in-law, but details are hard to come by. Read was in 1878 allowed to resign rather than face a tribunal over a morals issue.

Leonard died after a long illness; his remains were interred at the Angaston cemetery with those of his wife. His children included:

- James Leonard Jun. ( – ) was in 1878 a clerk with the Bank of South Australia at Georgetown. He married Florence Joice Gason on 6 August 1878, and transferred to Gawler in 1880. but was soon proven insolvent and was forced to resign. He died before 1908.
- Mary Ann Emily Elizabeth Leonard (12 September 1856 – 1886) married Henry Player (1853–1923) on 7 February 1877.
- Joseph John Henry Leonard (c. 1863 – 19 November 1929) was born in Gawler, South Australia. He was admitted to the civil service as a cadet in 1879, and posted to the Colonial Architect's office. A self-taught artist, he achieved some success as a newspaper illustrator in Adelaide and Sydney. He signed his work in various ways, including "Leo" and "J. H. Leonard", so may be confused with that of his perhaps more illustrious uncle.

Mrs Leonard had three children from her marriage to Douglas: a son, born 3 January 1852, who may have died in infancy, and two daughters: Mary Douglas (c. 1844–1875) and Anne Douglas, who married (veterinarian) Dr J. W. Horton ( – 26 July 1903) and had at least four children.

Rev. Leonard's sister Annie Leonard married Rev. T. W. Charlesworth (c. 1823 – 15 December 1879) in Perth on 5 March 1854. They moved to South Australia, living at Sandy Creek, Keyneton, and Angaston, where he practised homeopathic medicine. Their son James B. E. Charlesworth (18 October 1856 – 11 August 1929) was a first-class cricketer.
