= Charles Victor Robertson =

Charles Victor Robertson (9 October 1882 – 26 May 1951) was a New Zealand - Australian businessman, politician and educator who played a major part in the development of modern accountancy, brokerage, and business education in Australia, New Zealand and the United Kingdom. He was the governing director and founder of Hemingway & Robertson, Hemingway Robertson Institute, and Australasian Assets and Goodwill, positions he held until his death. He was also the last president of the Stock Exchange of Melbourne, and the first chairman of the Melbourne branch of the Liberal Party of Australia.

== Life ==
Robertson was born in Scotland, and attended King's College, Auckland, New Zealand. where his father, the Scotsman, Charles Alexander Robertson had been Headmaster. After studying accountancy he went into business with Nello Porter and W. H Hemingway forming an accounting firm, publishing house and correspondence school specialising in accountancy and business courses. They later split the business, and following an expansion to Australia he set up permanently in Melbourne in 1913. Robertson built the Melbourne headquarters at Bank House in Bank Place, Collins Street and opened offices throughout Australia and later operations in North America and the United Kingdom. In Britain he was made Vice President of the Royal Institute of Commerce from 1929 to 1930, a Fellow of the Society of Incorporated Accountants and Auditors and a Fellow of the Royal Society of the Arts. Following his return to Australia, Robertson was embroiled in a landmark High Court tax case, which contested his income in Britain. Ironically, it was his close friend Justice Owen Dixon who fined Robertson, and arranged for him to help amend the loophole in the Commonwealth tax laws. Afterwards it is rumored Robertson was satirically made to play left-handed (his non-preferred) against Dixon in a round of golf, which being ambidextrous he still won. A keen speculator and prudent investor, Robertson had far reaching pecuniary interests and directorial roles in mining, wheat and wool, as well as educational links through his Hemingway Robertson Institute with the University of Melbourne. He was made president of the Stock Exchange of Melbourne from 1934 to 1936, managing the formation of the Australian Associated Stock Exchanges which opened in 1937. In his later years and up until his death, Robertson was a Victorian representative, and first chairman of the Melbourne branch, of the Liberal Party of Australia, and a confidant of Robert Menzies. Robertson was an important figure in the 1949 Australian federal election, and defeat of Ben Chifley, where Menzies and the newly formed Liberal Party won power in a massive landslide, scoring a 48-seat swing—still the largest defeat of a sitting government at the federal level in Australia.

An avid adventurer and sportsman, Robertson was known to host raucous hunting and fishing parties and bush dances at his beloved Mallacoota estate, Mirrabooka. He was also closely involved with the Royal Melbourne Golf Club, Royal Society of the Arts and Melbourne Savage Club, the later of which he was club president. Robertson was married twice, first to Rosetta Maude Clark in 1908, and, in 1913, to Ida Caron Robertson. He died at the age of 69 in Melbourne and was survived by his second wife and four children.
