= James Hutchison (Australian politician) =

Australian politician and printer

The Honourable James Hutchison
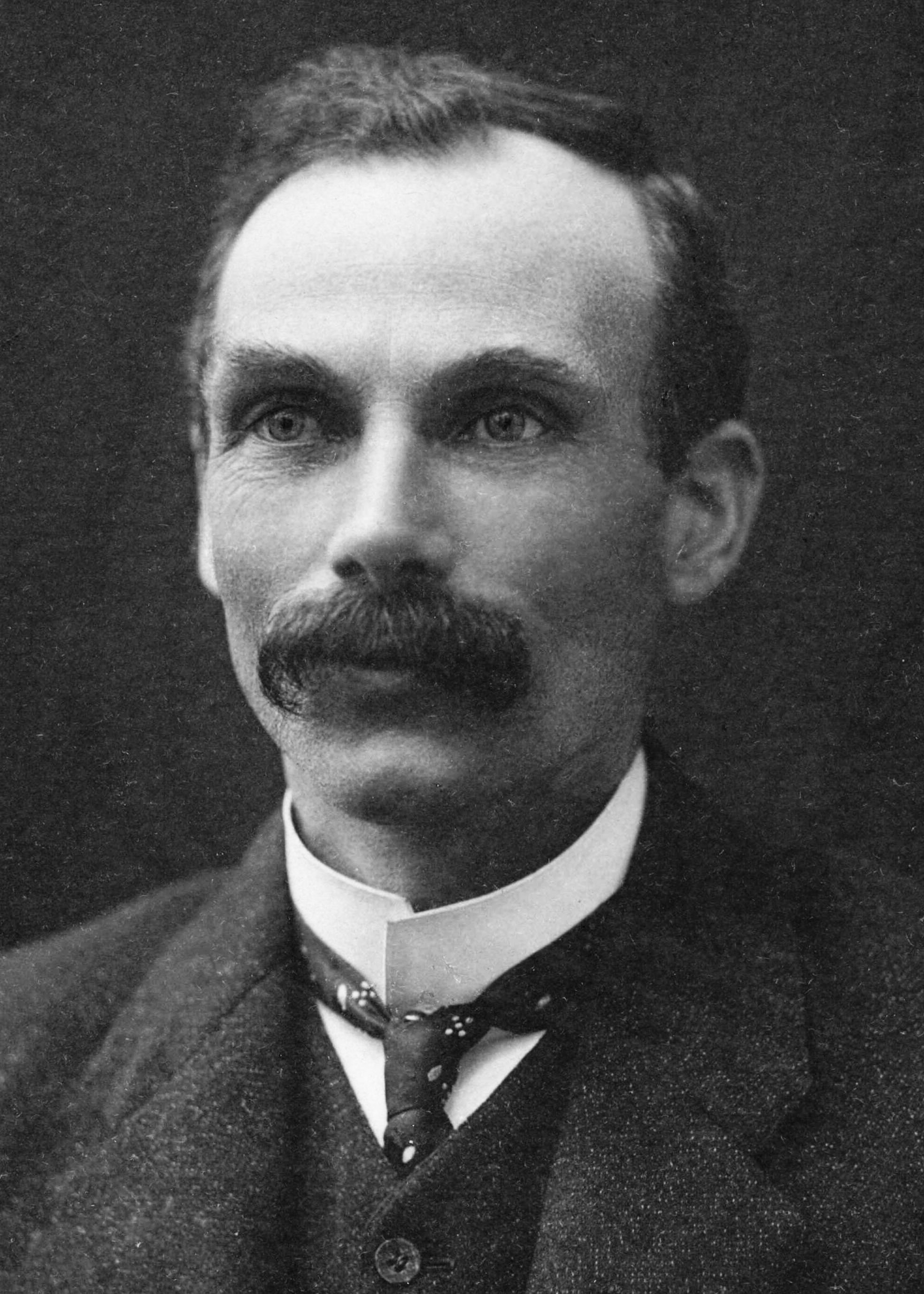

Member of the Australian Parliament for Hindmarsh
- In office 16 December 1903 – 6 December 1909
- Preceded by: Position established
- Succeeded by: William Archibald

Member of the South Australian Parliament for East Adelaide
- In office January 1898 – May 1902
- Preceded by: John McPherson
- Succeeded by: Position abolished

Personal details
- Born: 20 April 1859 Aberdeen, Scotland
- Died: 6 December 1909 (aged 50) Melbourne, Victoria, Australia
- Party: Labor
- Spouse: Mary Jane Trebilcock (m. 1886)
- Occupation: Politician, printer

James Hutchison (20 April 1859 – 6 December 1909) was an Australian politician and printer. He was a member of the Australian Labor Party (ALP), serving in the South Australian House of Assembly (1898–1902) and Australian House of Representatives (1903–1909). He was an honorary minister in the First Fisher Ministry (1908–1909).

== Early life ==
Hutchison was born in Aberdeen, Scotland, received a primary education and was eventually apprenticed as a compositor on the Daily Free Press and attended the mechanics' institute. He migrated to South Australia in 1884 with fellow worker, John McPherson and they found work on the South Australian Register. In 1886, he married Mary Jane Trebilcock. In 1888, Hutchison and McPherson were sacked for taking part in a strike over their paper's opposition to union labor. In 1889 Hutchison established a press, Hutchison, Craker & Smith, with two other sacked compositors and in 1890 began publishing a satirical paper, Quiz.

== South Australian politics ==
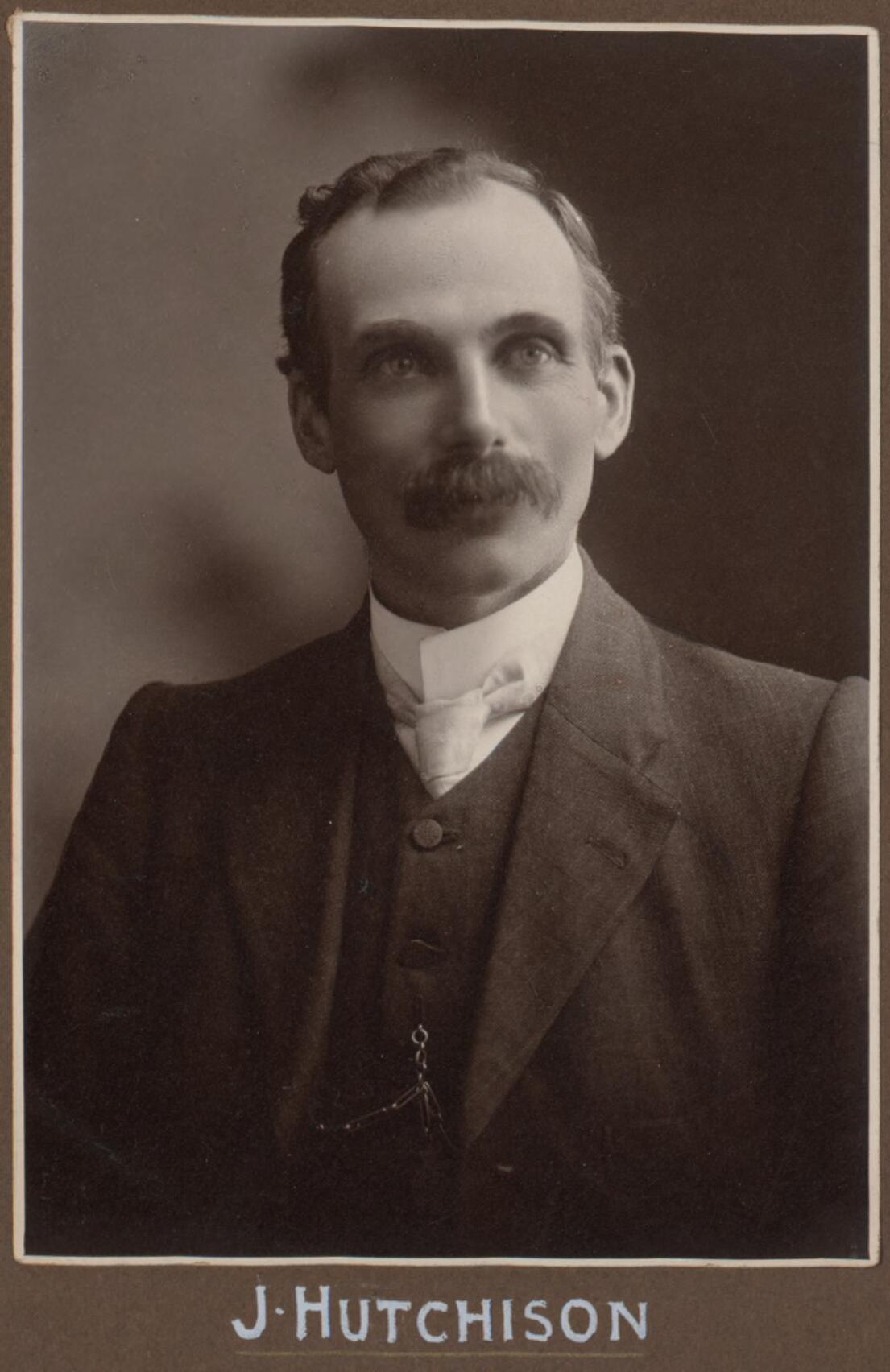
Hutchison in 1908

In December 1897, John McPherson, who had been elected as the United Labor Party member for the seat of East Adelaide in the South Australian House of Assembly, died and Hutchison won the subsequent by-election on 22 January 1898. In the House he supported the federation of Australia and White Australia. In his opposition to a bill authorising the take-over and electrification of some of Adelaide's horse tram lines, he made remarks about Charles Tucker, a supporter of the bill, which led Tucker to sue for libel, bankrupting Hutchison in April 1902. The seat of East Adelaide was abolished at the May 1902 election, Hutchison was not elected to any of the new seats.

== Federal politics ==
At the 1903 federal election, Hutchison won the House of Representatives seat of Hindmarsh. From November 1908 until June 1909, Hutchison was an honorary minister in the first Fisher ministry representing the Minister for Defence in the House of Representatives. He died suddenly in Melbourne from "inflammation of the kidneys and gall bladder", survived by his wife and six children.

== Notes ==
South Australian House of Assembly
Preceded by John McPherson	Member for East Adelaide; Jan 1898 – May 1902; Served alongside: Theodor Scherk	Seat abolished
Parliament of Australia
New division	Member for Hindmarsh; 1903–1909	Succeeded by William Archibald
