= Kapunda Herald =

Local Kapunda, Sth Australia, newspaper (1878–1951)

The Kapunda Herald was a newspaper published in Kapunda, South Australia, from 29 October 1864 to 25 January 1951. From 1864 to 1878 the masthead was subtitled "and Northern Intelligencer". It was published weekly, except for the period February 1872 to September 1894 when it appeared bi-weekly. When closed, the newspaper was merged with the Barossa News to become the Barossa and Light Herald.

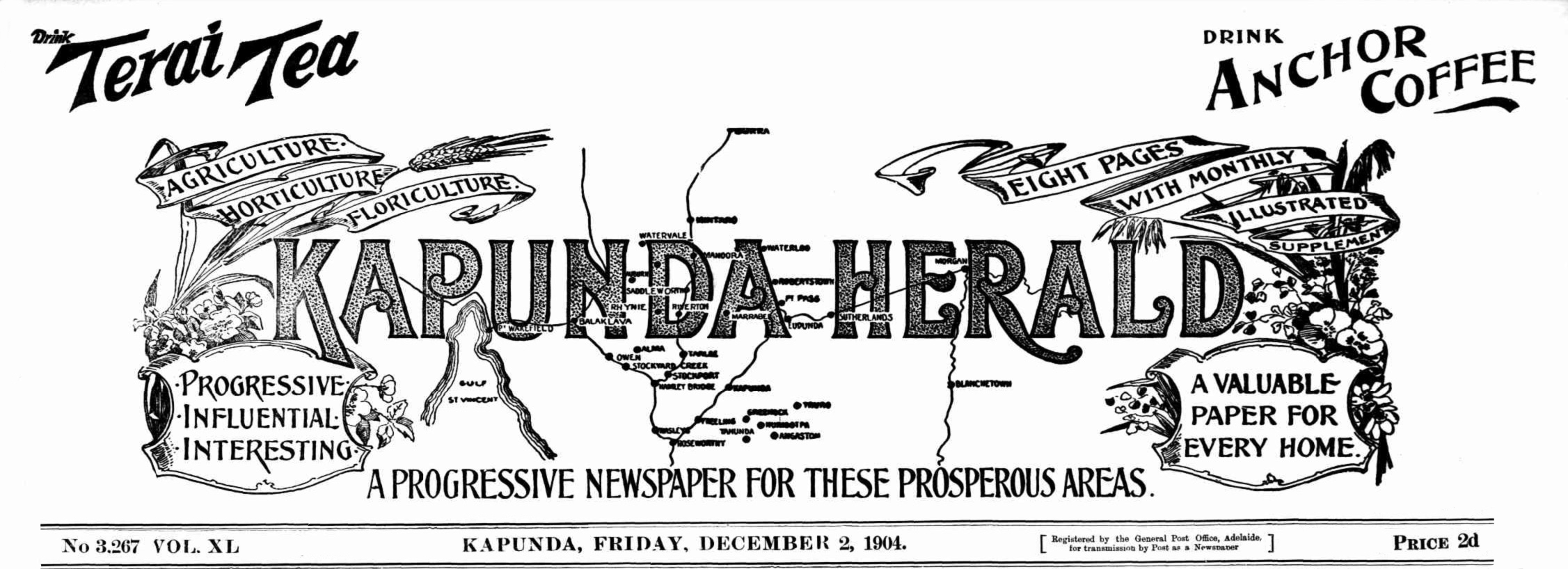
The Kapunda Herald 's masthead in December 1904

== History ==
Northern Star (7 March 1860 – 26 December 1863): Around 1860 journalist George Massey Allen (c. 1828 – 15 November 1886) founded in Kapunda the Northern Star, the first English-language newspaper in regional South Australia. Printed by Allen in Main Street, Kapunda, it was described as "a very creditable six-page folio newspaper". After a run of three years, the business ran into difficulties and James Elliott (c. 1836 – 22 April 1883), and James Scandrett (25 July 1836 – 8 June 1903) purchased his printing press.

Kapunda Herald and Northern Intelligencer (29 October 1864 – 8 March 1878); From 1864 Charles Hastings Barton (1829–1902), editor and part-owner of the Tanunda Süd-Australische Zeitung, controlled the newspaper, renaming it The Kapunda Herald and Northern Intelligencer, though some commentators saw little difference between the two publications. Elliott, whose brother was Joseph Elliott (c. 1833 – 21 May 1883) of the Southern Argus, was the first editor and just two months later he and Scandrett were the sole proprietors. Barton was declared insolvent in 1866 and fled to Maryborough, Queensland, leaving many of his supporters considerably out of pocket.

Kapunda Herald (12 March 1878 – 3 May 1951): The title of the newspaper was simplified on 8 March 1878. Elliott died in 1883 and Scandrett ran the business for the next 20 years. P. McMahon "Paddy" Glynn was the highly respected editor from 1883 to 1891, followed by Charles B. O'Reilly, who had long experience with the Register and became a major shareholder of the company Kapunda Herald Ltd. formed in 1909 after the death of Scandrett. Leslie Tilbrook, whose family owned The Northern Argus, joined the Kapunda Herald staff in 1911, became manager and editor in 1917, and owner in September 1923.

Notable journalists included William David Ponder and William John Sowden, who as "A. Pencil" wrote the "Scratchings in the City" column from 1886 to 1899; the Hon. D. J. Gordon MLC, who contributed the "City Scratchings" column as "Timoleon" from 1901 to 1909. There was one more contributor to the "City Scratchings" column: an unknown journalist who from 1912 to 1914 wrote as "The Quill", but had neither the wit of Sowden nor the wisdom of Gordon, and the column was never revived.

Publishing innovations included a lithographed color supplement in the 22 December issue of 1893 which included a calendar and depictions of locations around Kapunda. From 1903 to 1911 a monthly photographic supplement was included, celebrating nearby towns and prominent people. From October 1916 to the end of 1917 the back page, inverted, was in the form of a separate newspaper The Midlands Gazette devoted to the Riverton region ("Circulating in Riverton, Saddleworth, Auburn, Rhynie, Tarlee, Stockport and Hamley Bridge"). This ploy had been used elsewhere, as a trial before committing to launching a new publication. If this were the case it must have failed, as no new paper was forthcoming. The feature dropped towards the end of 1917. Until April 1926 the Herald's banner was subtitled "With which is Incorporated the Midlands Gazette".

With increasing mechanization, rural populations all over Australia shrank and with improved roads and other means of communication the importance of regional newspapers declined as the reach of the capital city newspapers broadened. The Herald had in 1930 shrunk to four pages and was each year becoming less profitable. The paper shrank from four pages to three then two in March 1948. In 1951 Tilbrook sold the paper and it was merged with the Barossa News to become the Barossa and Light Herald.

== Digitisation ==
The Kapunda Herald and Northern Intelligencer Vol I., No. 1 of 29 October 1864 to Vol. XIV, No.1013 of 8 March 1878 and The Kapunda Herald Vol. XIV, No.1013 of 12 March 1878 to Vol.87 No.5,678 of 25 January 1951 have been digitised from photographic copies by the National Library of Australia and may be accessed using Trove.
