= Jane Woodhouse =

American politician

Jane Woodhouse McLaughlin (November 29, 1914 - July 21, 2004) was an American advocate for mental health treatment and a state representative in the Colorado House of Representatives.

Born in Hartford, Connecticut, she grew up in Weathersfield, Connecticut. She graduated from Bennington College with a degree in theater in 1936. She moved to Washington D.C. and studied law before receiving her law degree in Colorado.

She served in the Colorado House from 1957-1960 representing Denver County, Colorado. She married cattle rancher and fellow representative Frederic T. McLaughlin of Basalt, Colorado February 20, 1960. She served as a guardian ad litem. She was a Democrat. Her husband, a Republican, switched party affiliation in 1988.

The Colorado General Assembly passed a House Memorial in her honor.
