= Henry Woodhouse =

Henry Woodhouse may refer to:

- Henry Woodhouse (colonial administrator) (1573–1637), governor of Bermuda, 1623–1627
- Henry Woodhouse (MP) (1545–1624), English politician
- Henry Woodhouse (forger) (1884–1970), Italian-born American aviation writer, magazine publisher, investor, and collector
- Henry Woodhouse, father of the eponymous heroine of the novel Emma by Jane Austen
