= Charles Dumas (newspaperman) =

Australian politician

Charles Morris Russell Dumas (1851 – 19 February 1935), generally referred to as Charles M. R. Dumas, was a South Australian newspaper proprietor and politician. He was the proprietor of The Mount Barker Courier and Onkaparinga and Gumeracha Advertiser for 54 years and served as president of the South Australian Provincial Press Association from 1915 until his death. He was a member of the South Australian House of Assembly from 1898 to 1902, representing the electorate of Mount Barker.

== History ==
Charles was born in Sydney the second son of Victor Dumas (1806 – 26 December 1882) and his wife Frances (ca.1816 – 20 February 1903); the family moved to Mount Barker in 1854. He was educated at the private school run by his father, then spent a few years in Adelaide to qualify as a Master Printer.

In 1872 he purchased Mr. Jolly's printery in Mount Barker, and on 1 October 1880 produced the first issue of the Mount Barker Courier, or to give its full name, The Mount Barker Courier and Onkaparinga and Gumeracha Advertiser. He supervised the business as the sole proprietor for 54 years, a record rarely equalled in Australian provincial newspapers.

He was a member of the South Australian Provincial Press Association, and elected its president in April 1915; he held that position until the time of his death.

In 1923 the Provincial Press Cooperative Company of South Australia, which took over the advertising agency of Colonel Hampson, was formed. Dumas was chosen chairman of directors, and retained that position until the time of his death.

The Courier remained in his and his family's hands until 1 May 1938, when it was sold to T. H. Monger.

== Politics ==
He became auditor for the District Council of Mount Barker in 1880, and served in that position until 1887. In 1888 he was elected to the council and served as chairman from 1889 to 1892.

In 1898 he was elected to the Mount Barker seat in the House of Assembly made vacant by the appointment of Dr. Cockburn as Agent-General. He remained in office for four years.

== Other interests ==
Dumas was heavily involved in local concerns: He was a member of the Mount Barker Agricultural Society and was for several years elected vice-patron, and he was a vice-president and life member.

He was a foundation member of the Onkaparinga Racing Club, and never missed a meeting on the course. He was its oldest member, and the last surviving member of the first committee.

He was a member of the Mount Barker Institute, a committee member for a number of years, and its president from 1910 to 1912.

He followed all manner of sports, and in his later years enjoyed a game of bowls; he played regularly for the Mount Barker Club, and was elected patron in 1934.

== Family ==
He married Amelia Paltridge ( – 1 November 1938), eldest daughter of John Paltridge (ca.1831 – 5 October 1917) of Mount Barker, on 1 August 1883. Their children were:

- Victor Charles Maxwell "Max" Dumas (5 December 1884 – 2 November 1943) served with the AIF in France.
- Sir Russell John Dumas BE, MICE, KBE, CMG (17 January 1887 – 10 August 1975) was involved with major engineering projects in Western Australia.
- Constance Elizabeth Dumas (5 April 1889 – 16 September 1950) married George Dennis Coffey of Mentone, Victoria
- Sir Frederick Lloyd Dumas (15 July 1891 – 24 June 1973) married Daisy Hall on 23 November 1915. They had three daughters. Influential editor of The Advertiser
- Una Kathleen Dumas (10 April 1893 – 1979) married Jack Gleeson Taylor of Strathalbyn on 1 September 1923.
