= The Southern Argus =

South Australian newspaper

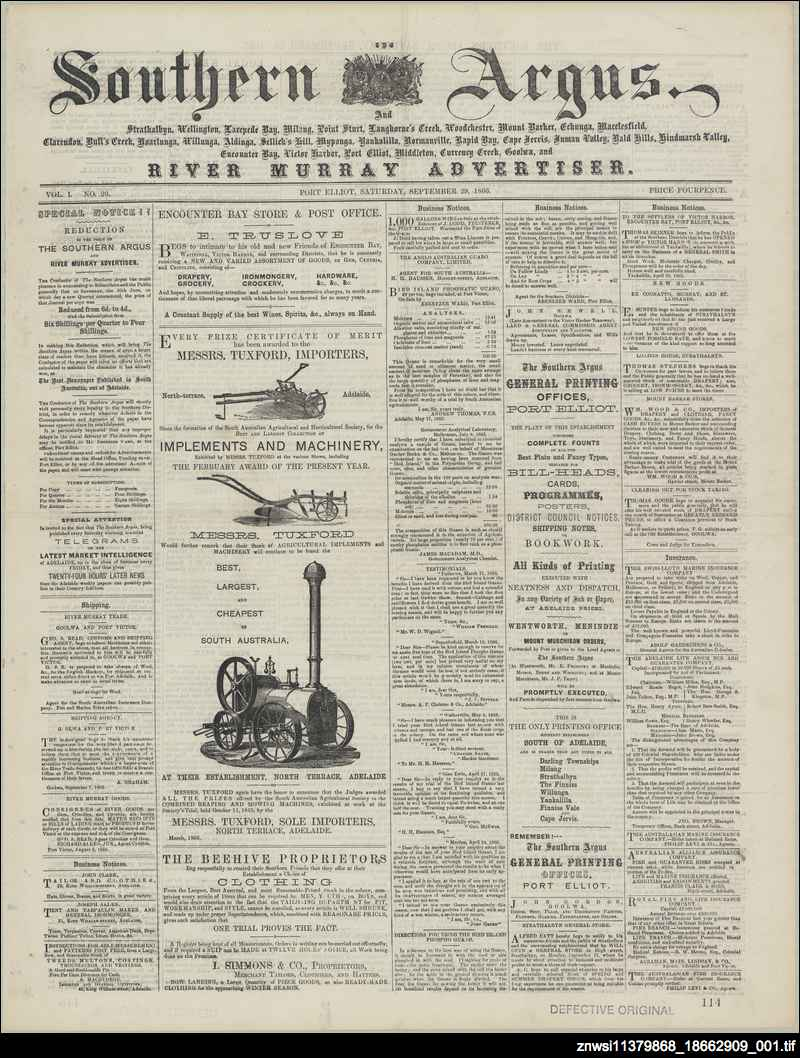
Front cover of the Southern Argus, 29 September 1866

The Southern Argus is a newspaper first published from March 1866 in Port Elliot, South Australia, and then in Strathalbyn from 1868 to the present. It is published on Thursdays.

== History ==
The Southern Argus (as distinct from the Northern Argus published in Clare) is one of the state's oldest country newspapers, privately owned by the Elliott and Jones families for 140 years. It was founded by Ebenezer Ward (1837–1917) in Port Elliot as a weekly newspaper, the first issue appearing on Saturday 17 March 1866. While primarily called the Southern Argus, for the first decade it was also subtitled; "And Strathalbyn, Wellington, Milang, Langhorne's Creek, Woodchester, Mount Barker, Echunga, Macclesfield, Bull's Creek, Clarendon, Noarlunga, Willunga, Aldinga, Sellick's Hill, Myponga, Normanville, Yankalilla, Rapid Bay, Cape Jervis, Inman Valley, Bald Hills, Hindmarsh Valley, Encounter Bay, Victor Harbor, Port Elliot, Middleton, Currency Creek and Goolwa,.and River Murray Advertiser."

Ward expected that the new southern port of Port Elliot was to become an enterprising outlet for the River Murray trade. Using the original Observer printing press, Ward set up the newspaper in the small coastal town; its first office was previously J. Barton's shop. In mid-April 1868, following financial difficulties and ownership changes, the production of the newspaper moved to William Colman's shop in Strathalbyn, then on 5 December 1868, to their new building adjacent to the Strathalbyn Post Office. It was purchased in 1871 by William Fisher and Joseph Elliott (c. 1833 – 21 May 1883), the latter whose brother James Elliott (c. 1836 – 22 April 1883) was the first owner of The Kapunda Herald. Elliott bought his partner out shortly after.

Joseph W. Elliott (1853–1939), only son of Joseph Elliott, was educated by W. S. Moore, later at Adelaide Educational Institution. When his father died, he quit university to take over the newspaper. He was elected mayor of Strathalbyn in 1898. In 1912 he founded the Victor Harbor Times, whose first editor was his son Cecil Cave Elliott (1889– ).

The long title of the newspaper persisted until 5 July 1877 when it was shortened to the Southern Argus and River Murray Advertiser. On 4 January 1893, it lengthened again to The Southern Argus Strathalbyn, Goolwa, and River Murray Advertiser, later variously re-adding Victor Harbor, Milang, Meningie. On 14 August 1940, the subtitle was finally removed.

== Literature ==
The Southern Argus published serials and poems by South Australian writers. The first serial was Middle Life: a tale by James Dunlop, in 1870.

== Distribution ==
The publication's early coverage included the towns of: Strathalbyn, Wellington, Milang, Langhorne's Creek, Woodchester, Mount Barker, Echunga, Macclesfield, Bull's Creek, Clarendon, Noarlunga, Willunga, Aldinga, Sellick's Hill, Myponga, Normanville, Yankalilla, Rapid Bay, Cape Jervis, Inman Valley, Bald Hills, Hindmarsh Valley, Encounter Bay, Victor Harbor, Port Elliot, Middleton, Currency Creek, and Goolwa.

== Preservation and digitisation ==
This newspaper title has been preserved on microfilm by the State Library of South Australia. It has been digitised from the microfilm for the Australian Newspapers Digitisation Project of the National Library of Australia.

== See also ==
- List of newspapers in Australia
