= H. J. Woodhouse =

Australian painter (1854–1937)

Herbert James Woodhouse (1854 – 10 June 1937) was an Australian painter in watercolors, noted for his accuracy of execution,

== History ==
Frederick Wedgewood Woodhouse (c. 1821 – 29 December 1909), was born in Hadley, England, son of painter Samuel Waterhouse. In 1857 he emigrated to Victoria, settling in Geelong, where he was known as a painter of racehorses, and made a portrait of every Melbourne Cup winner from 1861 to 1888. He had been commissioned by George Sennett to paint he first eleven winners, and found a ready market for the many others he painted. He was highly respected for his likenesses. With the development of photography, work became harder to find and less lucrative. His remains were buried in the Brighton General Cemetery. Several of his seven sons were artists:

Frederick William Wedgewood Woodhouse, aka Frederick Woodhouse, Jnr, (July 1846 – 22 May 1927) also painted horses, his work closely resembling that of his father. He was also known as an athlete, a competition walker and friend of Billy Lyall. He married Annie Fisher on 25 November 1885.

The fourth son, Herbert James Woodhouse (1854 – 10 June 1937), was born in Essex and at age three came to Australia with his parents. He left school at age 14 to take up work in lithography, studying engraving under H. S. Sadd, and drew for the New Sporting Era, a Melbourne weekly. He left for Adelaide to replace William John Kennedy (1848–1894) as cartoonist for Adelaide Punch (1878–1884). He became part-owner in 1884, but failed to arrest its decline, and the paper was absorbed by the lively Lantern. At least one critic attributed its failure to Woodhouse, whose "ill-conceived and badly drawn cartoons" were only matched by the paper's "vulgar, slangy and oftentimes disgusting" writing.

- In 1884 he was commissioned by Sir Thomas Elder to paint Newstead, winner of that year's Maribyrnong Plate.
- In 1885 he was commissioned by E. W. Ellis to paint the horse Lord Wilton, winner of that year's Adelaide Cup. He returned to Melbourne in 1886.
- He illustrated R. P. Whitworth's 1887 novel Hine-Ra, Maori Scout and produced a portrait of the author for its frontispiece.

He was also known for his lithographs and woodcuts, and was a founding member of the Victorian Lithographic Artists and Engravers Club He was also involved in amateur theatre, a member of Adelaide's short-lived Yorick Club. His remains were interred at a cemetery in Geelong, Victoria.

Relationship, if any, to the animal painter William Arnold Woodhouse (1857–1939) of Lancashire has not been found.
