= Mark Woodhouse (cricketer) =

Zimbabwean cricketer (born 1967)

Personal information
- Full name: Mark Bryan Woodhouse
- Born: 10 January 1967 (age 59); Salisbury, Rhodesia
- Batting: Right-handed
- Bowling: Right-arm medium

Domestic team information
- Years: Team
- 1994/95: Mashonaland Country Districts

Career statistics
Competition	First-class
Matches	1
Runs scored	14
Batting average	14.00
100s/50s	–/–
Top score	14
Balls bowled	24
Wickets	–
Bowling average	–
5 wickets in innings	–
10 wickets in match	–
Best bowling	–
Catches/stumpings	–/–
- Source: ESPNcricinfo, 20 October 2012

Mark Woodhouse (born January 10, 1967) was a Zimbabwean cricketer. He was a right-handed batsman and a right-arm medium-pace bowler who played for Mashonaland Country Districts. He was born in Salisbury (now Harare).

Woodhouse made a single first-class appearance for the team, in the 1994/95 season, against Mashonaland Under-24s. Mashonaland made 14 runs in the only innings in which he batted, and made 0-24 with the ball in the innings in which he bowled.

Woodhouse was a lower-order batsman.

Clubs: Harare Sports Club, Alexandra Sports Club, Enterprise Country Club, Craneleigh Cricket Club
