= The Courier (Mount Barker) =

Newspaper published in South Australia

The Courier is a weekly newspaper published in Mount Barker, South Australia. For much of its existence its full title was The Mount Barker Courier and Onkaparinga and Gumeracha Advertiser, later shortened to The Mount Barker Courier.

== History ==
The newspaper was founded as The Mount Barker Courier and Onkaparinga and Gumeracha Advertiser on 1 October 1880, price 3d. (3 pence) for 4 pages. Charles M. R. Dumas was sole proprietor, and its offices were on Gawler Street, Mount Barker. Publication continued every Friday morning. In 1893 tentative moves were made to introduce an alternative title Mount Barker Courier and Southern Advertiser, but somehow the "less cumbrous title" never made it to the front page.

The newspaper later absorbed another publication, printed by Lancelot Ramsay Thomson, the Mannum Mercury and Farmer's Journal (30 March 1912 - 2 March 1917).

Dumas, who was for four years Member for Mount Barker, died on 19 February 1935, and his family kept it running until May 1938, when it was taken over by T. H. Monger, previously owner of the Tasmanian King Island News. In 1909 Dumas opened a printery in Murray Bridge, and started a newspaper there, the River Murray Advocate, but by the start of 1911 the Advocate existed only as a single page supplement in the Courier.

Monger's period of eight years, ending in March 1946, was short but eventful, encompassing World War II. The next owners were E. L. Perry and H. Edmondson. From 1952 the proprietors were F. T. Marston and E. L. Perry, and publisher was Norman E. K. Marston. In 1954, the newspaper's title was virtually unchanged, it had 10 pages, was published on Wednesdays and cover price was 4d.

In 1960, the paper was abbreviated to The Mount Barker Courier, and to simply The Courier by 1983.

== Today ==
As of May 2020, the paper has never missed a print run and is still in the hands of the same family, the Marstons. Its circulation is around 7,500 (down from 15,000 in its heyday in the 1970s and 1980s). Norm Marston, son of the proprietor since 1952 and now over 91 years old, is very likely Australia's oldest active regional newspaper owner and editor. Four generations of the family have worked at the press.

== Special features ==
A series of interest to lovers of local history, A Jewel Casket by "P.W" began in March 1947 and ran as a (mostly) weekly feature through to June 1950. The author's identity was never revealed beyond that of being a friend of the editor. The author made no secret of his support for John Wrathall Bull in the Bull v. Ridley header priority controversy. The State Library of South Australia has identified the author as Percy Whitington, who later wrote on local history for the Murray Valley Standard.

== Notable editors ==
Charles Richard Wilton (25 May 1855 – 8 March 1927), editor from 1881, left for Melbourne in 1889 to take up a position with the short-lived Daily Telegraph. then the longtime literary editor of the Adelaide Advertiser. But he maintained his connection with The Courier, contributing for 36 years, as "Autolycus", a weekly column noted for its incisive wit.

James McCullum was editor for six months in 1889, leaving for a sub-editorship with the Silver Age in Broken Hill.

G.F. Harrison became associate editor of the Melbourne Age.

I.J. Osterman was editor from 1996 until 2021.

Norm Marston is managing editor until his death in October, 2025.

The current editor is Elisa Rose since December 2021.
