= Mark Woodhouse (basketball) =

British basketball player

Mark Woodhouse nicknamed Woody (born 10 August 1982 in England) is a British professional basketball player, and currently plays for Amber Valley Spartans in the Sherwood Basketball League.

The 6 ft 9 in Small Forward/Centre attended North Carolina A&T, and started his playing career with Avernas-Hannut (Belgium) in 2005.

Woodhouse was soon transferred to Icelandic team Thor AK for remainder of the 2005/06 season.

In the summer of 2006 he signed for the Plymouth Raiders in the British Basketball League.

After attending the TBCA try-out camp in Andorra in June 2007 he was signed by Llave Azul Eliocroca, based in the city of Lorca near Alicante.

In 2009, Woodhouse returned to England to sign for second-tier league side Derby Trailblazers. He missed the 2010 season with a knee injury.
