= Adelaide Punch =

Australian satirical magazine (1878–1884)

- A crop of the centre illustration of the Adelaide Punch, 7 December 1878.
- Former editors: J. C. F. Johnson; Godfrey Egremont; Henry O'Donnell
- Staff writers: D. M. "Dan" Magill; C. R. Wilton
- Categories: Satire, Humour
- Frequency: Fortnightly (1878); weekly from September 1878
- Format: Quarto
- Publisher: J. C. F. Johnson
- Founder: Haddrick and East
- First issue: 24 January 1878
- Final issue: October 1884
- Country: Australia
- Based in: Adelaide, South Australia
- Language: English

Adelaide Punch (1878–1884) was a short-lived humorous and satirical magazine published in Adelaide, South Australia. Like Melbourne Punch, it was modelled on Punch of London.

== History ==
Adelaide Punch had its origin in The Rattlesnake or Adelaide Punch, a fortnightly magazine first published by Haddrick and East on Thursday 24 January 1878. It failed after a few issues, leaving the printers Scrymgour and Sons holding a debt of around £100.

Rather than writing it off, they decided to persevere with its production, and momentarily interested D. W. Melville, at one time with the Register, to act as managing editor, but he found it interfered with his lucrative auctioneering business, so they settled on J. C. F. Johnson, of the Register (later M.P. for Onkaparinga). His team included D. M. "Dan" Magill (ca.1845 – 3 April 1916), also ex-Register; William John Kennedy (1848–1894), headmaster of Mount Gambier and Hindmarsh schools, as cartoonist (also associated with Quiz magazine); and C. R. Wilton, then a promising cadet.

The magazine was a considerable success, and went weekly in September 1878. Johnson purchased a half-share from Scrymgour in December that year and assumed the role of managing editor, and in 1879 became sole proprietor, bringing his brother A. Campbell Johnson in as partner.

In mid-1880 they advertised for another cartoonist (by this time the proprietors were Johnson and Scarfe); in July Adelaide Punch grew in size, and the type and layout were changed to more closely resemble the London Punch; South Australian newspapers greeted the new format with approval.

Around October 1881 Johnson hired Godfrey Egremont (died 1923), once the Register's theatre critic, prolific author and embezzler, as editor then in April 1882 sold out to E. H. Derrington, who appointed Henry O'Donnell as editor and engaged Herbert James Woodhouse (1858–1937) as cartoonist. O'Donnell and Woodhouse became owners in early 1884; quality suffered, the wit was gone and by October 1884 the magazine was in trouble; it was purchased by Charles A. Murphy, owner with Charles F. Stansbury, of an erstwhile competitor, the Lantern, and publication ceased.

The publication was Quarto size, ran to 8 pages, and sold for sixpence.
