= Edwin Derrington =

Australian politician (1830–1899)

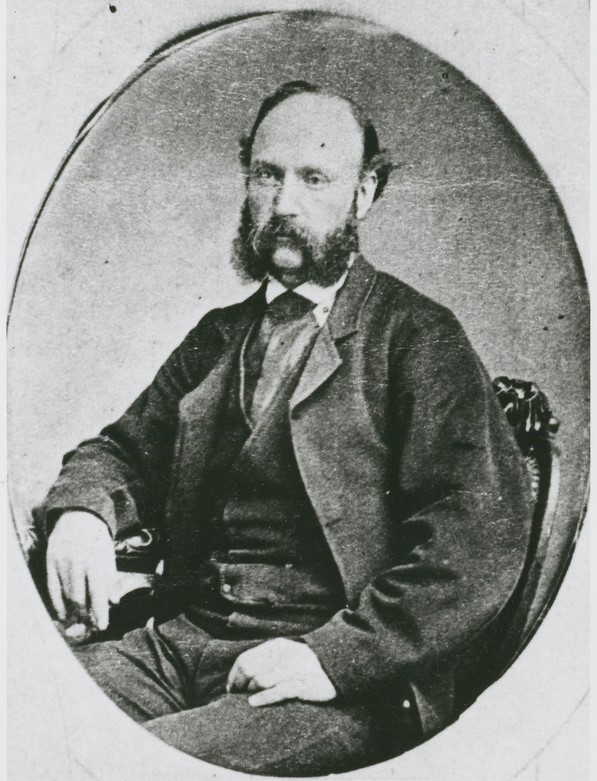

Edwin Henry Derrington (1 July 1830 – 14 October 1899) was a journalist and politician in colonial South Australia.

== Early life ==
Derrington was born in Birmingham, Warwickshire, England, the first son and fourth child of Edwin Derrington, a Dissenting minister, and his wife Susannah, née Buggins. He trained as a compositor and was working as a reporter in Birmingham by 28 September 1852, when he married Elizabeth, daughter of William Shread. Their son was born in June 1853, but within ten months Elizabeth and the child had both died.

Soon afterwards, Derrington emigrated to Australia. According to a later obituary he first landed in Melbourne, but by 1 September 1855 he was working for the South Australian Register and had married Elizabeth Rosa Ekers at St Andrew's Church, Walkerville. Of the couple's nine children, eight survived childhood.

Derrington continued working for the Register until he was appointed telegraph stationmaster at Mount Gambier on 1 January 1859. In September 1866 he became a partner in Blackwell, Derrington & Co., wholesale and retail store-keepers, a partnership that dissolved in 1869.

== Journalism ==
For many years, Derrington was connected with journalism in Victoria and South Australia; he owned and edited the Mount Gambier Standard from around 1869 to 1872. He then moved to Moonta, where he founded and ran the Yorke's Peninsula Advertiser and Miners' News for eleven years. He acquired the Port Adelaide News in 1878 and was its owner-editor until 1883, remaining its publisher until January 1885.

He purchased the Adelaide Punch from J. C. F. Johnson in April 1882, but had no success with the venture; he sold it in January 1884, and it folded shortly after. His biographer suggests his newspaper speculations probably foundered for financial reasons, noting that in 1882 the colony had forty-seven newspapers serving a population of fewer than 300,000 people.

As an editor Derrington pursued a vigorous liberal editorial line. He preferred a property tax to tariffs as a source of colonial revenue, supported payment of members of parliament, opposed the selection of land before survey, and advocated universal education as a corollary of universal suffrage. He believed female suffrage and a permanent executive would improve the quality of political life, sided with Darwinian science in its conflicts with religion, and argued for more teaching hospitals to raise the standard of medicine. He opposed the abolition of capital punishment, supported the exclusion of Chinese labour, and mocked contemporary fears of a Russian naval attack on Adelaide as "a lunatic scare". During the 1874 Moonta miners' strike against a proposed wage cut, he supported the striking miners and credited their eventual victory to orderly conduct and "the power of moral suasion".

== Political career ==
Derrington's advocacy for local causes such as improved transport, drainage of the south-east, and the establishment of a beet sugar industry, was popular with the residents of Mount Gambier. He was the member for Victoria in the South Australian House of Assembly from December 1871 to May 1873, and served as Commissioner of Crown Lands in the Henry Ayers Ministry from 22 January to 4 March 1872. According to his biographer, his appointment to the ministry after only one afternoon of parliamentary experience was a matter of expediency: the Ayers government wished to shelve a proposed railway through the south-east, and Derrington supported Mount Gambier commercial interests who wanted the line routed through their own district.

=== Ward v. Derrington ===
During an undistinguished parliamentary career, Derrington quarrelled publicly with fellow parliamentarian Ebenezer Ward, whom he accused of "ignoring nearly all the qualities that make up private and public worth" and of drowning his natural gifts "in unnatural sensuousness, idleness, and unprincipledness". Ward sued him for £2,000 in damages in the resulting libel action, Ward v. Derrington, which was heard over six days before Chief Justice Samuel Way and a special jury. Although Chief Justice Way appeared to consider Derrington guilty, the trial ended without the jury reaching agreement. A public "Derrington Defence Fund" was subsequently raised, with a meeting of sympathisers held at the Adelaide Town Hall Exchange-room, and ultimately collected more than his legal costs.

He was forced to resign his House of Assembly seat after a series of financial problems. He unsuccessfully contested the seat of Gumeracha in 1887.

== Later life ==
After his political and newspaper careers, Derrington became the paid secretary of the Temperance Alliance, then secretary of the Chamber of Manufactures, and later spent two years as a travelling lecturer for the Australian Mutual Provident Society. He was also active in the Bible Society, the Social Purity League, and in Bible Christian, Primitive Methodist and Wesleyan Methodist church affairs. He was noted as a debater and a singer, and played the violin and painted with modest ability. He resided at Kensington, South Australia.

He died on 14 October 1899; contemporary obituaries were described by his biographer as sincere, in recognition of the energy and enthusiasm he had brought to public causes in the colony.
