= Frank Johnson (politician) =

Australian politician

Joseph Colin Francis Johnson
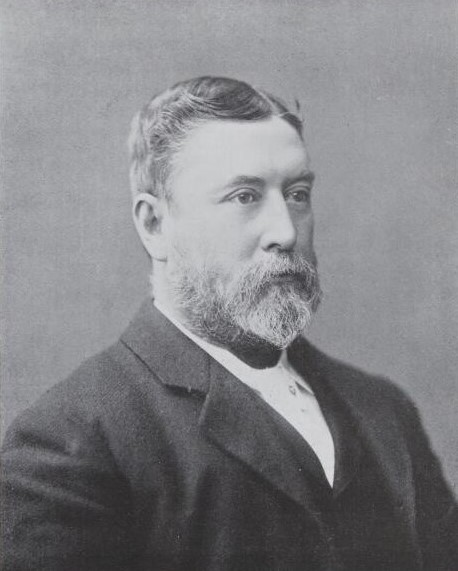

Minister of Education and of the Northern Territory
- In office 11 June 1887 – 27 June 1889
- Premier: Thomas Playford

Member of the South Australian House of Assembly for Onkaparinga
- In office 8 April 1884 – 24 April 1896 Serving with Rowland Rees (1884–1890); Robert Caldwell (1890–1896)
- Preceded by: John Carr
- Succeeded by: Walter Duncan

Personal details
- Born: 12 February 1848 Adelaide, South Australia
- Died: 18 June 1904 (aged 56) North Adelaide, South Australia
- Children: One adopted son
- Parent(s): Henry Johnson; Wilhelmina Colquhoun (née Campbell)
- Education: Geelong National Grammar School
- Occupation: Journalist, newspaper proprietor, politician

Joseph Colin Francis Johnson (12 February 1848 – 18 June 1904), generally called J. C. F. Johnson or Frank Johnson, was a journalist and politician in colonial South Australia, Minister of Education 1887 to 1889.

== Early life ==
Johnson was born in Adelaide, the son of Henry Johnson, an Adelaide solicitor, by his marriage with Wilhelmina Colquhoun, née Campbell, the third daughter of Colin Campbell, of Stonefield, Pine Forest, South Australia. His father moved to Victoria (Australia) during the gold-digging fever, Joseph was educated at the Geelong National Grammar School.

== Career ==
Returning to South Australia in 1868, he was for eleven years on the staff of the South Australian Register, noted for his theatre criticisms as The Gallery Boy. In December 1878 he purchased a half-share in the Adelaide Punch and shortly afterwards became sole proprietor. He conducted it for several years, but the paper suffered an irreparable loss when cartoonist W. J. Kennedy left. Around 1882 he became interested in gold mining and sold his interest to E. H. Derrington.

He was a member of Adelaide's short-lived Savage Club.

On 8 April 1884 Johnson was elected a member to the Electoral district of Onkaparinga in the South Australian House of Assembly, and was Minister of Education and of the Northern Territory from 11 June 1887 to 27 June 1889 in the Thomas Playford II Ministry. Johnson was the author of "Moses and Me," the record of a visit paid to the Mount Brown diggings in 1880. Johnson held his seat of Onkaparinga until 24 April 1896.

Johnson died in North Adelaide, South Australia, Australia on 18 June 1904, survived by an adopted son.
