= Luther D. Bradley =

American cartoonist (1853–1917)

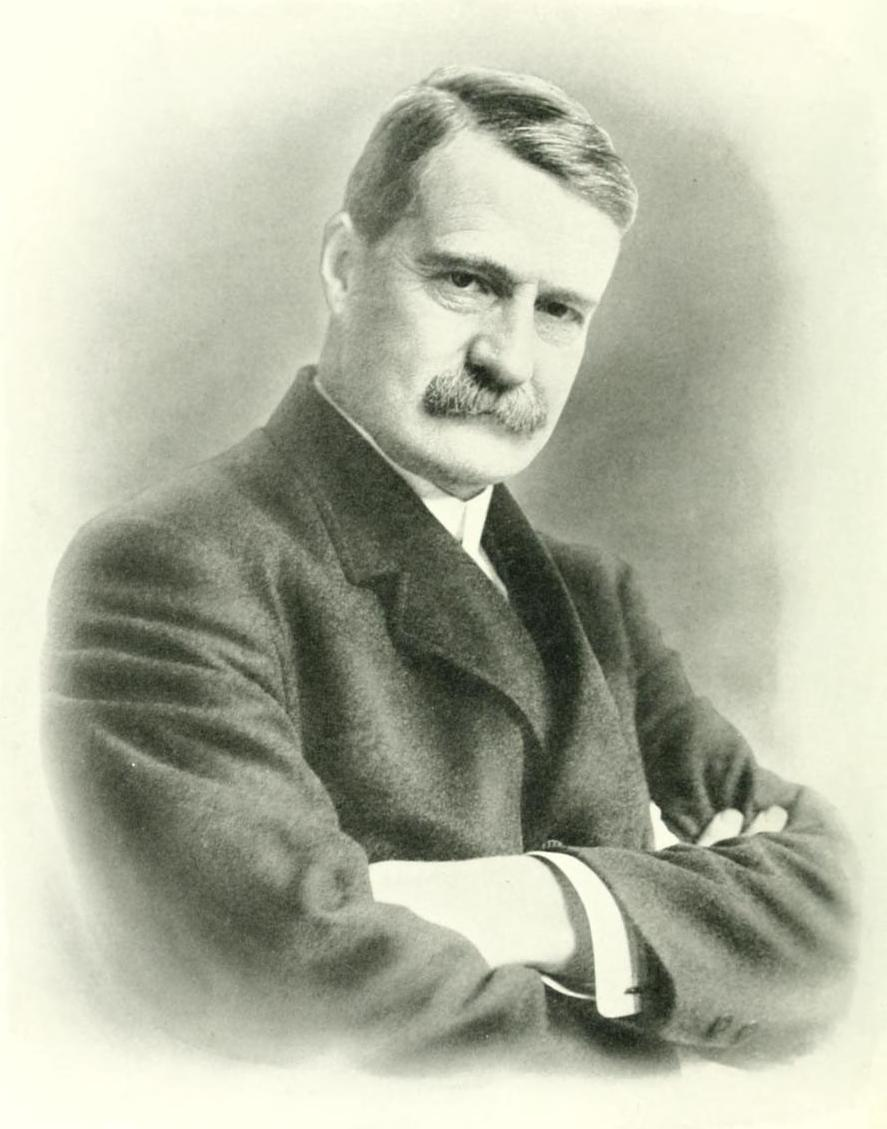
- Born: September 29, 1853; New Haven, Connecticut, US
- Died: January 9, 1917 (aged 63); Wilmette, Illinois, US
- Education: Yale University
- Employers: Chicago Daily News (1899–1917); Inter Ocean (1894–1898); Melbourne Punch (1888–1893)
- Known for: Editorial cartooning

Luther Daniels Bradley (September 29, 1853 – January 9, 1917) was an American illustrator and political cartoonist associated with the Chicago Daily News. Born in New Haven, Connecticut, he graduated from Yale University in 1875. After some years at his father's business, he traveled abroad, and spent over a decade in Melbourne, Australia, drawing for such publications as Melbourne Punch. He returned to Chicago in 1893, working for the Daily Journal and Inter Ocean, before joining the Daily News in 1899, where he spent the remainder of his life and career. He was known for strong anti-war sentiments, opposing U.S. involvement in World War I.

== Biography ==
Bradley was born on September 29, 1853, in New Haven, Connecticut, to Francis and Sarah Beaman (Ruggles) Bradley. In 1857, the Bradley family moved to Chicago and later to nearby Evanston, where Bradley attended public school. He attended Northwestern University from 1870 to 1873 and Yale College from 1873 to 1875, where he took part in crew. After graduation he worked at his father's Chicago real estate business, Baird & Bradley. In 1882, he embarked upon a world trip, and after visiting London, arrived in Melbourne, where he took an illustrating job with the satirical magazine Australian Tit-Bits; later incorporated into Melbourne Life with Bradley as editor and cartoonist. In 1888, he became chief cartoonist of the Melbourne Punch after the retirement of artist Tom Carrington, and was at the Punch until 1893, with notable coverage of the Australian labor movement. He popularized Carrington's "King Working Man" figure, a crowned giant representing organized labor. His cartoons were generally accepted in London as fair presentations of Australian opinions.

His father having fallen ill, Bradley returned to Chicago in 1893. He successively worked for the Chicago Daily Journal (1894) and Inter Ocean (1894–1898), and in 1899 published the children's books Our Indians and Wonderful Willie!. In 1899, he joined the Chicago Daily News, where he became art director. His cartoons often appeared on the front page. It was during World War I that his work became most widely known. He was known among cartoonists as the most prominent critic of American interventionism, by 1916 being the only cartoonist of a major daily paper to oppose U.S. military involvement. Cartoon historian Rick Marschall notes Bradley was not the only antiwar cartoonist, but was "perhaps the most eloquent in illustrating his arguments."

He married Agnes Floyd Smith in Evanston on October 31, 1901, and had four children: Francis, John Freeman, Sarah Elizabeth, and Margaret. In religion he was Episcopalian and in politics an Independent Republican. He died at his home in Wilmette, Illinois, on January 9, 1917, aged 63. Two days later, a tribute cartoon penned by John T. McCutcheon appeared on the front page of the Chicago Daily Tribune. Cartoons by Bradley, a collection of his work along with tributes from Daily News associates, was published in March 1917. Three months after his death, America entered World War I. In subsequent decades, Bradley's life and cartoons were discussed in numerous scholarly works. In 1980, Richard Marschall wrote "[Bradley's] own cartoon messages deserve to be reintroduced to America." A drawing of Bradley's adorned the cover of Karen Russell's acclaimed 2011 novel Swamplandia!.

== Works ==
=== Books ===
- Our Indians, a Midnight Visit to the Great Somewhere-or-other. New York: E. P. Dutton & Co. 1899.
- Wonderful Willie! What he and Tommy did to Spain. New York: E. P. Dutton & Co. 1899.
- War Cartoons from the Chicago Daily News. Chicago: Chicago Daily News. 1914.
- Cartoons by Bradley, Cartoonist of the Chicago Daily News. Chicago: Rand McNally. 1917.

=== Select cartoons ===
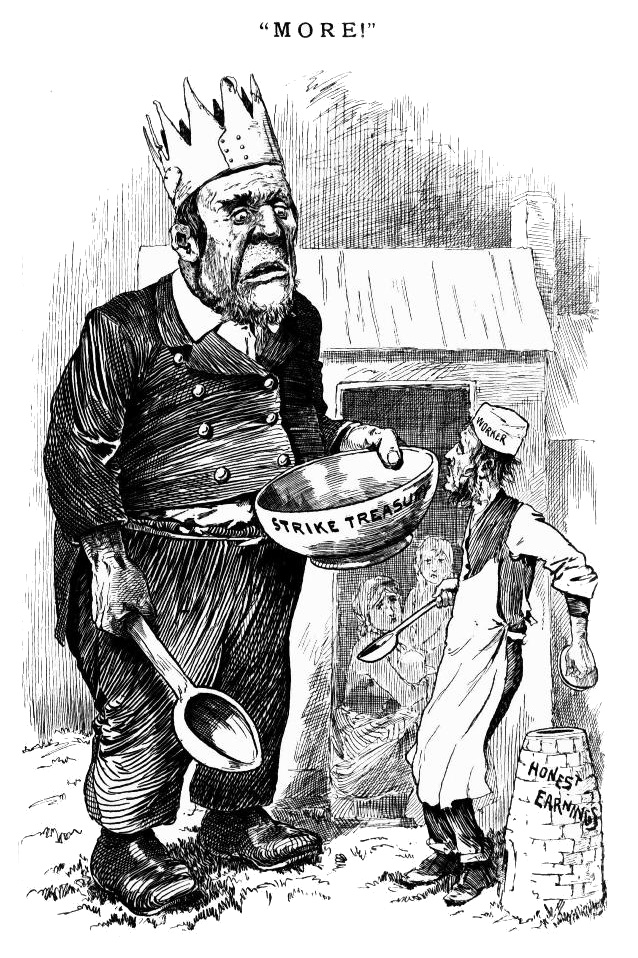
"More!" (Punch, 1890): 'King Working Man', representing Australian labor unions, demands a worker's 'honest earnings'

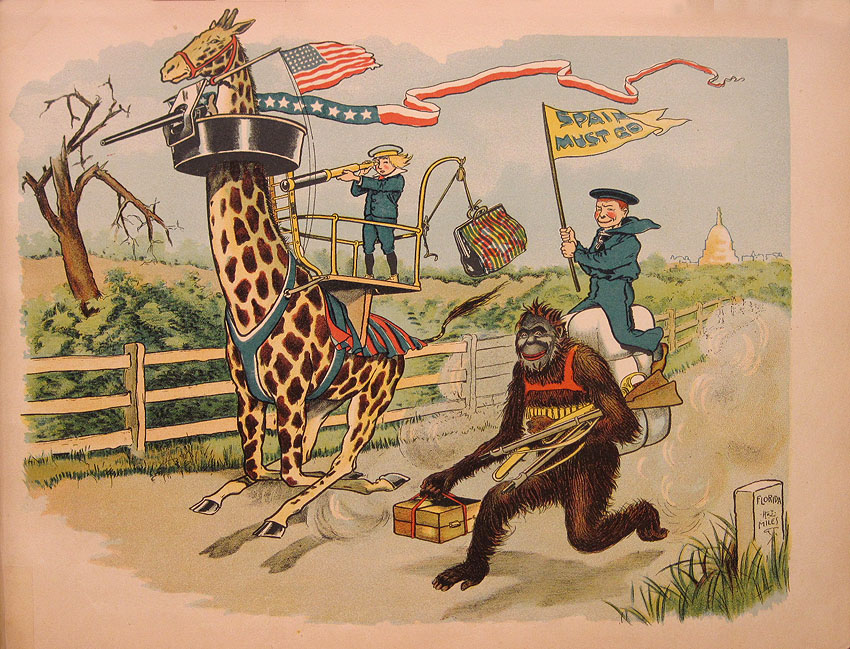
Scene from Wonderful Willie! (1899)

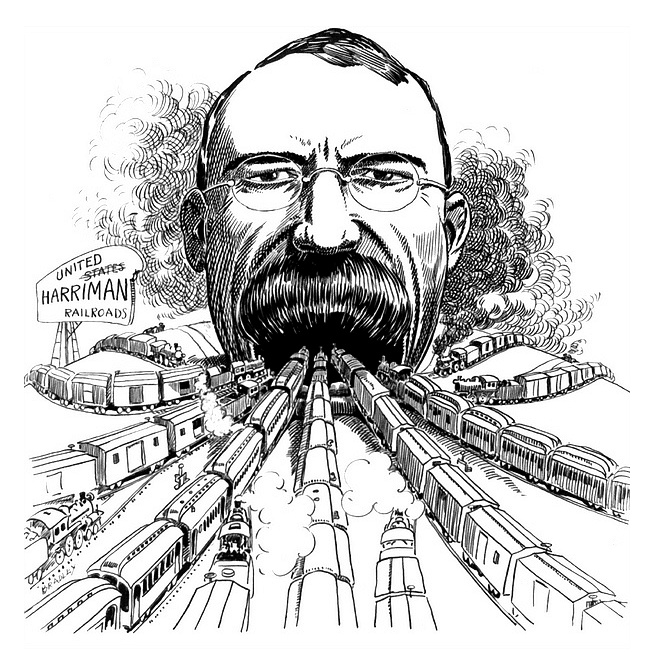
"Design for a Union Station" (1907), depicting railroad tycoon E. H. Harriman swallowing American railroads

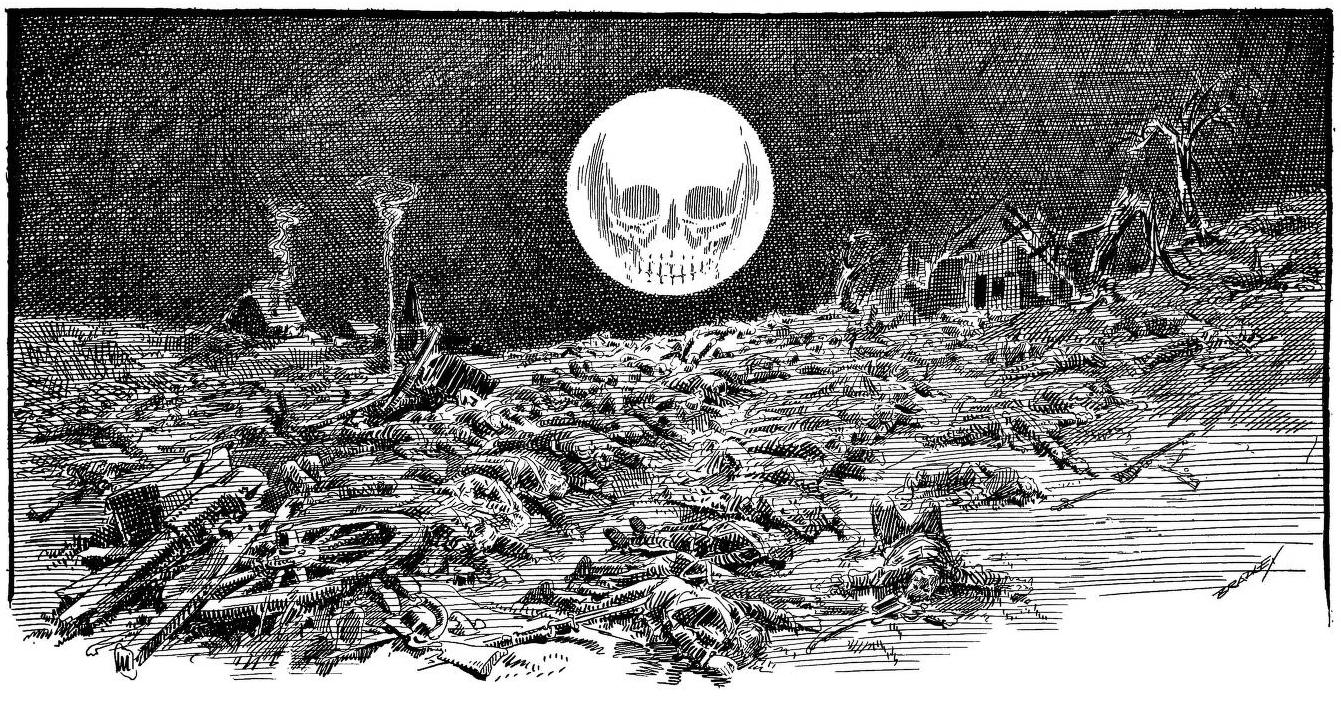
"The Harvest Moon" (1914), depicting dead soldiers strewn across a barren landscape

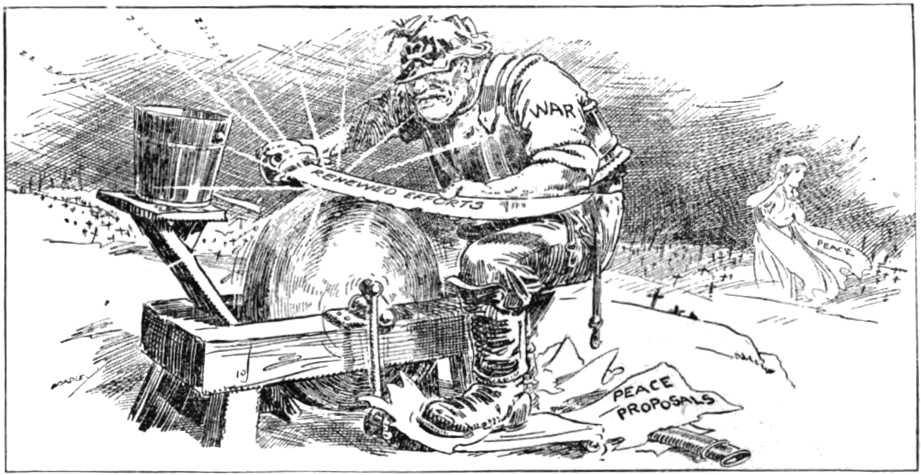
"The Final Answer?" (January 4, 1917), Bradley's last cartoon, depicting War sharpening a sword labeled "renewed efforts" while stomping on a paper labeled "peace proposals"
