= Australasian Sketcher with Pen and Pencil =

The Australasian Sketcher with Pen and Pencil was a monthly magazine published in Melbourne by The Argus between 1873 and 1889.

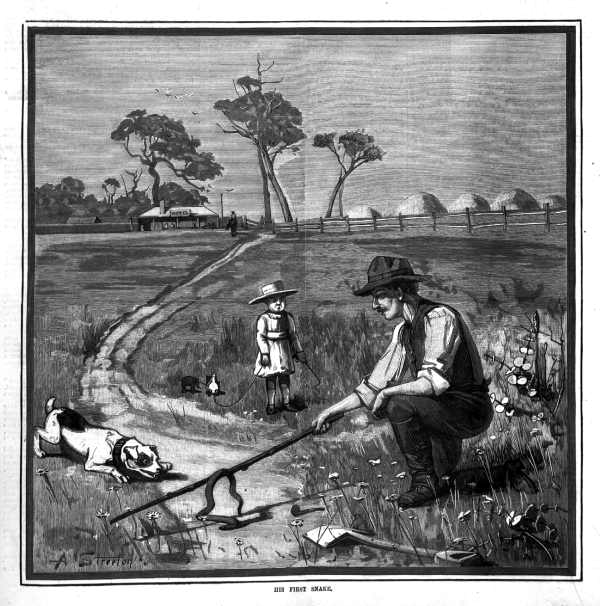
His first snake by Arthur Streeton

== History and profile ==
The Sketcher appeared once a month, starting April 1873. The proprietors were named as Edward Wilson, Lauchlan Mackinnon and others.

The magazine contained many illustrations and engravings as well as original articles, poetry and short stories, musical and theatrical reviews, social and sporting notes which capture "the picturesque phases of our public and social life of notable objects and events in Australia and New Zealand". It provides an important pictorial account of life in the colonies before the widespread use of photography.

The Sketcher employed many prominent artists, including Louis Buvelot, John Gully, political cartoonist Tom Carrington and illustrator Julian Ashton. It published Arthur Streeton's first black and white work on 24 January 1889.

Authors and poets who wrote for the publication include Marcus Clarke and James Brunton Stephens. Later issues had less literary content and more illustrated news items. In 1880 it briefly moved to a fortnightly publication which lasted until 1882 before returning to a monthly journal. In 1889, it merged with The Australasian.

From 1875 it published an Adelaide edition which incorporated The Illustrated Adelaide Post. This coincided with the first issue of the Frearson Brothers' first publication, The Illustrated Adelaide News.
