= Tom Carrington =

Tom Carrington may refer to:

- Tom Carrington (illustrator) (1843–1918), Australian journalist, political cartoonist and illustrator
- Tom Carrington (Dynasty character), minor character that appeared in the television series Dynasty in 1985
- Thomas Carrington, updated version of the Dynasty character in the 2017 reboot series
