= Patrick Moloney =

Patrick Moloney may refer to:

- Paddy Moloney (1938–2021), Irish musician, composer, and record producer
- Patrick Moloney (physician) (1843–1904), Irish physician and writer in Australia
- P. J. Moloney (Patrick James Moloney, 1869–1947), Irish Sinn Féin politician
- Patrick Moloney (hurler)

== See also ==
- Pat Moloney, camogie player
