= Alfred Vincent =

Federation era cartoonist and painter, based mainly in Melbourne, Australia

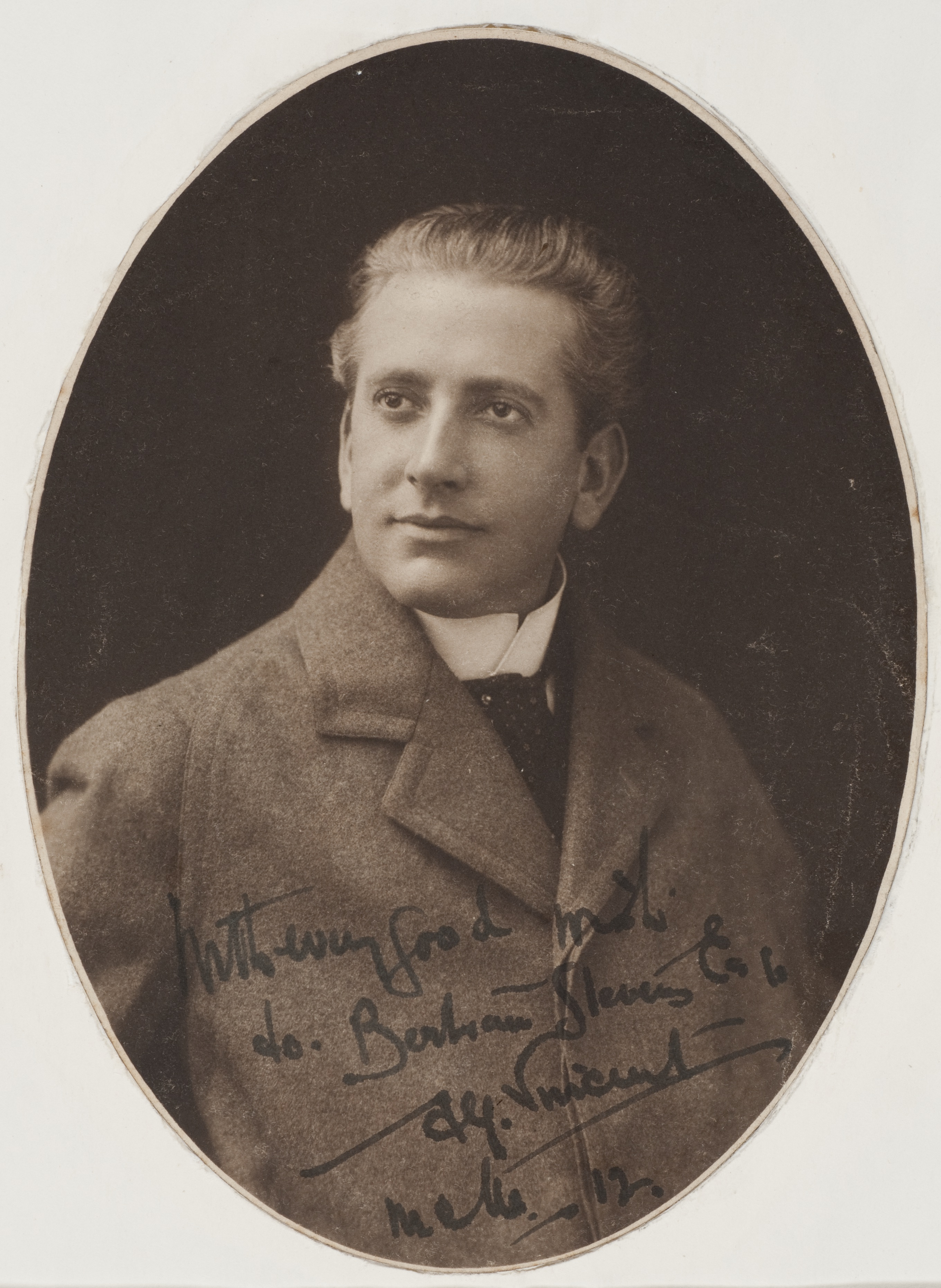
- Alfred Vincent, 1912 photograph with signed message to Bertram Stevens
- Born: Alfred James Vincent; 9 February 1874; Launceston, Tasmania, Australia
- Died: 6 December 1915 (aged 41); Sydney, New South Wales, Australia
- Occupation: Cartoonist

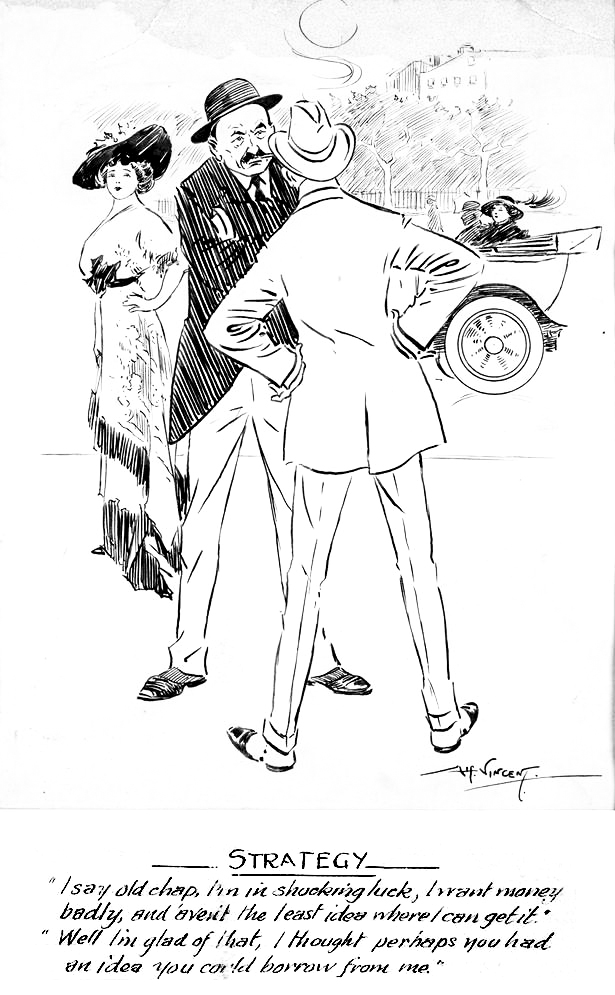
Alfred Vincent cartoon for The Bulletin

Alfred James Vincent (9 February 1874 – 6 December 1915) was an Australian cartoonist born in Launceston, Tasmania.

== Early life ==
Vincent was born in Launceston, Tasmania, on 9 February 1874 to Frances (née Wilks) and William Thomas Vincent. At the age of seventeen, he presented "Skits: a memento from the Tasmanian Exhibition, Launceston, 1891-92."

== Cartoonist ==
Vincent's involvement with Melbourne Punch began in 1895 when he started contributing political cartoons. Notable works from this period include "Which is the Burning Question? [Cricket or Federation?]" dated 7 February 1895, "A Familiar Saying. 'After a Painting by Michael Angelo'" featured a policeman chasing a man with a painting under his arm (Melbourne Punch Almanac, 1895) and "Standing Room Only" dated 11 June 1896.

In December 1896, at the age of 22, he assumed the main cartoon page of Melbourne Punch, succeeding Tom Carrington. Additionally, he created the anti-suffrage cartoon titled "Will She Go to the Poll?" which depicted a woman on a bike pulling various items, including a pram and a kitchen stove. This cartoon was published in Melbourne Punch on 12 November 1896.

Alf Vincent contributed work to the Melbourne Punch from 1895, in 1896 succeeding Tom Carrington as feature artist. After many years of submitting work to the Sydney Bulletin, he joined their staff in 1898, as a replacement for Tom Durkin and remained there until 1915. He also contributed to The Bulletin's sister publication, Lone Hand.

His work may be mistaken for that of his idol Phil May (1864–1903), a fact that was noted by several critics, including A. G. Stephens and Lionel Lindsay.

He was a member of the Melbourne Savage Club from 1900 to 1915 and designed the club emblem. Along with Randolph Bedford, Vincent was instrumental in the Savage Club changing their articles to accept artists as members without payment of a joining fee. This resulted in most of Melbourne's leading [male] artists joining the Club in the early Twentieth Century.

== Death ==
After some months of ill health, aged 41 and a mental crisis he committed suicide at his home at Manly on the evening of 6 December 1915 by cutting his throat with a razor. His wife, Phyllis May (née Potter), whom he had married on 5 April 1913, at St James's Old Cathedral in Melbourne, and their daughter, outlived him. Phyllis May died in 1916.

== Collections ==
- Art Gallery of Western Australia, Perth
- Castlemaine Art Museum
- Art Gallery of New South Wales, Sydney
- Ballarat Art Gallery, Ballarat
- Melbourne Savage Club, Melbourne
- National Gallery of Victoria, Melbourne
- National Library of Australia, Canberra
- National Gallery of Australia, Canberra
- State Library of New South Wales, Sydney

== Sources ==
- McCullough, Alan, Encyclopedia of Australian Art, Hutchinson of London, 1968, ISBN 0090814207
- Backhouse, Sue, Tasmanian Artists of the Twentieth Century, Pandani Press, Hobart, 1988, ISBN 9780731618378
- Williams, Graeme H., A Socio-Cultural Reading: the Melbourne Savage Club through its Collections, MA (thesis), Deakin, 2013
