= George Dancey =

Australian cartoonist

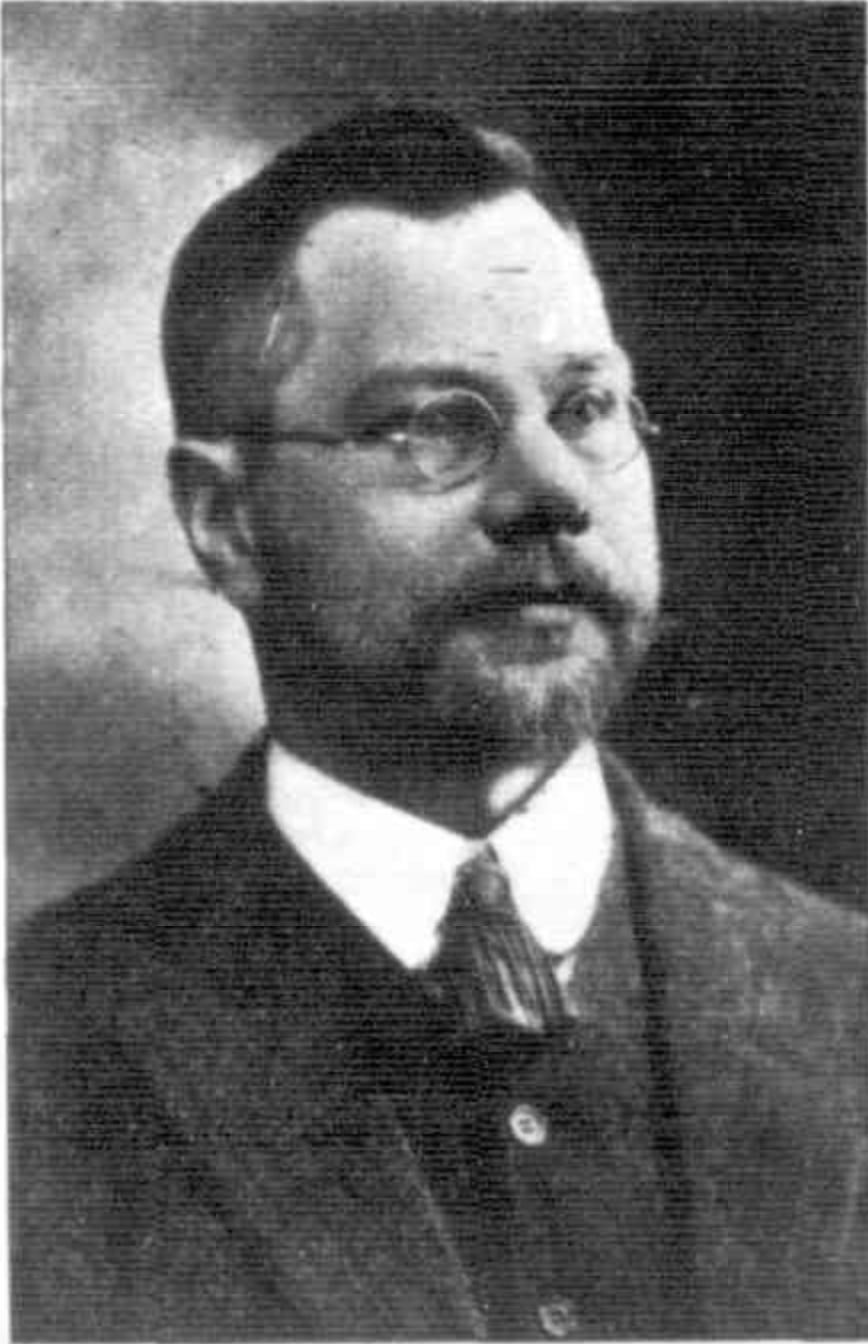
Punch cartoonist George Henry Dancey in 1907

George Henry Dancey (c. 1865 – 23 December 1922) was an Australian artist, known for cartoons and caricatures, particularly for the Melbourne Punch, second only to Tom Carrington in his time with that paper.

== History ==
Dancey was born in England around 1865 and learned design while working from age 13 at the studios of Clayton and Bell, London. After spending a year in South Africa, he arrived in Melbourne in 1891, and in 1893 succeeded Alf Vincent as chief cartoonist on the staff of Melbourne Punch, holding the position for 23 years, for most of that time with Alek Sass as a colleague. He had a break from Punch 1896–1898, when George Treeby ("Bron") took over.

He finally retired in 1919 and died at his home, "Seacroft", 11 Beaconsfield Terrace, St Kilda, after several years of poor health. Melbourne Punch, which had lauded his work in 1918 made no mention of his retirement (or resignation) or after. The only newspaper to publish an obituary (of some two dozen words) was The Herald, buried under a pile of stone on page 13. He fared better in Sydney, where The Sun devoted several column-inches to his life and work.

His art has been described as belonging to the "Lord Leighton" school, exhibiting fine draftsmanship. He was noted for his murals and during The Great War produced many fine memorials. His work is held by several national galleries, including the Melbourne Art Gallery and National Portrait Gallery The National Library, Canberra holds two of his political cartoons.

== Other works ==
- He designed the honour roll at the St Kilda Park State School.
- He produced numerous designs for stained glass, notably soldiers' memorials for Christ Church, St Kilda and Trinity Church, Balaclava, Victoria.
- Up to the time of his death he produced "cartoons" (designs for rendering by specialists in stained glass art) for the Melbourne firm of Brooks, Robinson, Ltd.
- He provided illustrations for W. Sabelberg's book Etella of the Pangurangs.

== Family ==
Dancey married Annie (c. 1850 – 19 September 1934); they had two daughters:

- Clara Dancey married Alek Sass (Alexander Phillip Sass, c. 1870–1922)
- Ethel Dancey married Cyril Devonport; son born in 1924 was named Lindsay George Dancey Devonport.

He should not be confused with his contemporary in Melbourne, the printer and stationer George Herbert Dancey (died 1 September 1921).
