= Orange World and Other Stories =

2019 collection of short stories by Karen Russell

- Author: Karen Russell
- Language: English
- Genre: Short story collection
- Publisher: Alfred A. Knopf
- Publication date: May 2019
- Publication place: United States
- Pages: 271 pp
- ISBN: 978-0-525-65613-5

Orange World and Other Stories (2019) is a collection of eight short stories written by the American writer Karen Russell. The collection was published by Alfred A. Knopf in May 2019.

== Critical reception ==
NPR wrote "Orange World is a thing of beauty, a stunning collection from one of the most brilliant literary minds of her generation." The Los Angeles Review of Books said "Russell’s writing is at times overly lush, like the rich landscapes she describes. But even at its most profligate, her ability to give weird and creepy shape to what might otherwise remain dark corners of the human psyche is refreshing. Orange World and Other Stories is a collection hovering on the threshold between horror and comedy, between the phantasmagoric and the fleshly."The New York Times wrote "For all their wildness, the stories in 'Orange World' are fundamentally tame. Little happens in them that wouldn’t ultimately be palatable, after a glass of pinot gris, in the snuggest of book groups. Not all her endings are happy ones, but love can often save the day. Writing for The Guardian, Daisy Johnson praises how "always Russell's writing reaches past beauty to find the oddity, the heat beneath" and that Russell's Orange World "inhabits landscape entirely, bringing the Floridian humidity to every sentence". Johnson concludes that "though [Russell's] characters are living their own magic-realist, fabulist lives, it is possible to see ourselves within them, peering out." In a starred review, Kirkus Reviews called the collection, "A momentous feat of storytelling in an already illustrious career."
