= The Pictorial Australian =

Australian monthly illustrated newspaper

The Pictorial Australian was a monthly illustrated paper published in South Australia by the Frearson Brothers, Samuel and Septimus, who were printers located on King William Street and Grenfell Street, Adelaide. The publication evolved over time, both in terms of name, publication frequency, and content.

== History ==
The Frearson Brothers, Samuel and Septimus Frearson, were stationers, printers and publishers in colonial Adelaide, known for producing illustrated publications.

=== The Illustrated Adelaide News ===
The first Frearson publication was issued from Vol 1, No. 1 of January 1875 (Note: It supplanted The Illustrated Adelaide Post, primarily intended for settlers to send "back home" to England. It is not known what connection or agreement existed between two publishers of similar publication for one to follow the other seamlessly.) to September 1880, devoted almost entirely to the Kelly Gang. A sister-publication with a more satirical tone, Frearson's Weekly Illustrated, was also published from 16 February 1878 until 26 April 1884.

=== Frearson's Monthly Illustrated Adelaide News ===
In 1880 the Illustrated Adelaide News was renamed. It maintained publication continuity with its predecessor and was published from October 1880 to December 1884.

=== The Pictorial Australian ===
The newspaper was renamed again, and continued to be published from January 1885 to 1 October 1895 (also continuing the previous sequence of Volume and Issue numbers). Despite the title Pictorial Australian, the paper's content was predominantly South Australian until the early 1890s, when it increasingly covered Western Australia.

== Digitisation ==
Most issues of The Illustrated Adelaide News have been digitised by the National Library of Australia, and may be accessed using Trove.

Copies of Frearson's Monthly Illustrated Adelaide News from Sixth Year No. 10 of 1 October 1880 to Tenth Year No. 12 of 1 December 1884 have been digitised by the National Library of Australia, and may be accessed using Trove.

Copies of The Pictorial Australian from Vol XI No 1. (New Series) of 1 January 1885 to Vol XXI Nos. 10, 11, 12 of October, November and December 1895 have been digitised by the National Library of Australia, and may be accessed using Trove.
