= Melbourne Punch =

Australian magazine

Melbourne Punch (from 1900, simply titled Punch) was an Australian illustrated magazine founded by Edgar Ray and Frederick Sinnett, and published from August 1855 to December 1925. The magazine was modelled closely on Punch of London which was founded fifteen years earlier. After two false starts, Sydney Punch (1864-1888) took off in New South Wales. And, Adelaide Punch, was published in South Australia from 1878 to 1884.

== History ==
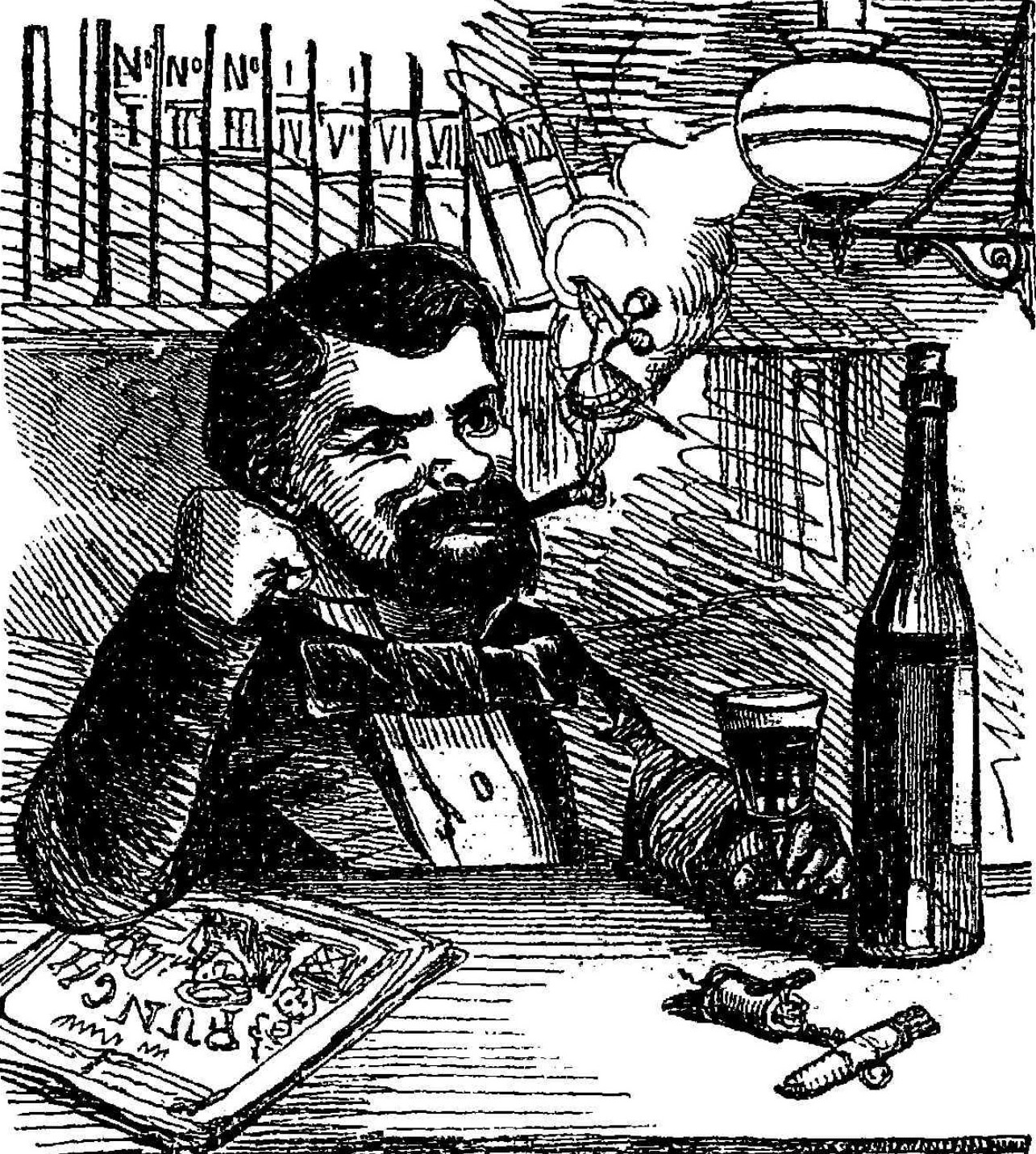
Satirical self-portrait of the Melbourne Punch engraver Samuel Calvert, 2 August 1855

Ray and Sinnett published the magazine 1855–1883, followed by Alex McKinley 1883.

In the early years it relied heavily on reprinted articles and illustrations from its British parent Punch in London and from other overseas publications.

Staff artists included Nicholas Chevalier 1855–1861, Tom Carrington 1866–1887, J. H. Leonard 1886 – c. 1891.

Contributing artists included J. C. Bancks, Luther Bradley, Samuel Calvert, O. R. Campbell, Miles Evergood, George Dancey, Tom Carrington, Tom Durkin, Claude Marquet, Ambrose Dyson and his brother Will Dyson, S. T. Gill, Alex Gurney, Hal Gye, Percy Leason, Emile Mercier, Alex Sass, Montague Scott, Alf Vincent, Samuel Garnet Wells, and Cecil "Unk" White.

Editors included Frederick Sinnett (1855–1857), James Smith (1857–1863), Charles Bright (1863–1866), William Jardine Smith (1866-1869), Tom Carrington (intermittently) and John Bede Dalley (1924).

Writers included John Arthur Andrews, Butler Cole Aspinall, Frederick Broomfield, Charles Gavan Duffy, Edward Dyson, Mary Hannay Foott, R. H. Horne, Patrick Moloney, James Smith, Thomas Carrington, Charles Whitehead, R. P. Whitworth, Nicholas Chevalier.

It was involved in the creation of The Ashes cricket trophy in 1883.

It incorporated the Melbourne Bulletin in 1886, after which it became more involved with "society" news.

A cartoon titled "BAIL-UP!" in 1900 was possibly the first published use of the Kelly Gang in a satirical context.

An annual, variously titled Punch Almanac, Melbourne Punch Almanack, Melbourne Punch's Office Almanack and similar, was published for a time.

A section of the contents page from 10 December 1925

The publication was Folio size and initially it contained 8 pages. This increased to 12 pages in 1878 and it was 18 pages by 1891. It sold for sixpence.

The title was acquired by The Melbourne Herald in 1924 and given a new life as a national publication of art and humor, whose first issue appeared on 18 December 1924. John B. Dalley was editor, C. R. Bradish associate editor, and staff included Norman Campbell (Note: Norman Campbell (died 6 November 1941) was an Australian actor and humorist, writing for The Bulletin as "Norbell". He was associated with Nellie Stewart and played Judge Jeffries to her Sweet Nell in a revival of "Sweet Nell of Old Drury" in 1927. He was a frequent contributed to the weekly press and wrote the 1914 play In the Power of Sherlock Holmes, also playing the Holmes character.), Kenneth Slessor and Hugh McCrae, and later dubbed "The New Punch".

It amalgamated with Table Talk in 1926.

== Literature ==
Mahood, Marguerite The Loaded Line 1973
