= Frearson Brothers =

The Frearson brothers, Samuel, Septimus and Robert were businessmen and publishers in the early days of Adelaide, South Australia, perhaps best remembered for The Pictorial Australian, an illustrated monthly newspaper.

== History ==
Samuel Frearson (1845 – 22 September 1887), Septimus Frearson (1849 – 23 August 1932) and Robert Sands Frearson (c. 1853 – 26 January 1937) were born in London and emigrated with their parents Alfred Frearson (c. 1811–1867) and Frances Frearson (c. 1809–1898) and other siblings (10 in all) aboard Cotfield, arriving in Adelaide in November 1853.

Alfred and Frances took up land at Kanmantoo and later purchased Benjamin Archer Kent's residence and property at Kent Town.

Samuel began in business in 1868 as a stationer and bookseller in Kent Town, and was joined a year later by Septimus, trading as "Frearson Brothers", with a shop in Rundle Street; moved to 58 King William Street in 1872; the business became Frearson & Brother in 1873. In 1878 they secured a twenty-year lease on a building on the Gresham Street corner of King William Street which they named Frearson's Chambers, much of which they sub-let profitably.

They took in solicitor Alfred Bonnin (c. 1829 – 1910) as a partner and in 1882 they built Beaconsfield Buildings on the old King William site. They built new premises, Frearson's Printing House opposite the Sturt Hotel on Grenfell Street in 1882. The company published Frearson's Weekly, The Illustrated Adelaide News 1874–1880, Frearson's Monthly Illustrated Adelaide News 1881–1884 and The Pictorial Australian as well as a series of Almanacs, several handbooks: Frearson's Handbook to the Goldfields of West Australia (6th ed. 1894); Portonian Cartoon Album (1874)

They had a shop in King William Street, then removed to North Terrace before 1894, then to Grenfell Street.

Samuel caught an infection in 1884 while on a world cruise aboard the new steamer City of Rome. He never fully recovered, and died three years later.

In the 1880s the printing shop was moved to Adam Street, Hindmarsh, and in 1888 was acquired by W. H. Burford & Sons.

Septimus moved with his family to Western Australia in 1895, settling in Norseman, where he published the Norseman Pioneer, the first newspaper on the Dundas goldfields. He was elected mayor of Norseman in 1898. In 1914 he went to Dowerin to manage the farm of one of his sons, who was fighting overseas. When that son was killed, Frearson retired to Applecross, where he died.

Robert was engaged in business in the city up to 1891, when he was sent by his brothers to Western Australia to represent Frearsons' Printing House in Perth. Eventually he took over the management of Frearsons Printing House in Adelaide, which position he held until the firm changed hands. He then went into the advertising and publishing business on his own account. As a young man Frearson was an active member of the Church of Christ at Grote Street and Glenelg, and took a considerable interest in the Northern Territory, especially mining. He died at his home in L'Estrange Street, Knoxville (modern-day Glenside or Glenunga), leaving a widow, four sons, and three daughters.

Frearson's Printing House was still a going concern in 1962, with premises at 83 Sturt Street, Adelaide and 20a Adam Street, Hindmarsh, though it is likely the Frearson family by then had no interest in the business.

== Family ==
The children of Alfred Frearson (c. 1811–1867) and Frances Frearson (c. 1809 – 11 December 1898) include:

- Emma Frearson (c. 1834 – 26 October 1907), their only daughter, married William Trevett Dalwood (c. 1834 – 22 August 1909) on 6 September 1855
- John Black Frearson (c. 1841 – 11 March 1884), general dealer of Wakefield Street, married Mary Ann "Annie" Frearson, née Young (c. 1850 – 1 August 1892) in 1866; (Young/Frearson was an adopted daughter of A.& F. Frearson). He died as a result of a trap accident. Mary Ann married again, to William Brookes of Burra.

- Alfred Frearson (10 March 1869 – )
- Sarah Frearson (1871 – ) married Harry Thrush ( – ) on 26 November 1890
- Frank Frearson (1872 – ) married Emily Mary Morris ( – ) on 29 September 1894
- Annie "Nubby" Frearson (1874 – ) married Clifford Wall ( – ) on 13 June 1895
John had another child by an unknown woman:
- Harry Frearson (c. January 1879 – ) After John's death, Harry became the ward of his grandmother, Frances. On 25 May 1886 William Brookes and Alfred Frearson (both above) conspired to abduct the child, as his stepmother, having remarried, wished to resume custody of the child.

- Samuel Frearson (1845 – 22 September 1887) married Harriet Mary Budgen (–1917) in 1872

- Frederick Valentine Frearson (1873–1950) married Mary Ann Eggar Ferguson ( – 17 August 1943) in 1897
- Arthur John Frearson (1875–1880)
- Harry Budgen Frearson (1877–1896)
- Natal Arthur/Arthur Natal Frearson (1881– ) married Edith Annie Scottney Turbill ( – ) in 1909
- Minnie Frearson (1885– ) married Frank Bulfield (–) in 1911

- Septimus Frearson (1849 – 23 August 1932) married Emma Martha Smith (c. 1852 – 19 February 1928) in 1874

- Elsie Emma Frearson (22 March 1875 – ) married Dixon, lived Salmon Gums
- George Septimus Frearson (1876 – 31 March 1898) married Louisa Maria Schönburg on 29 March 1897. He worked for Pictorial Australian, then proprietor Norseman Pioneer.
- Jessie Mabel Frearson (1878–1902) married W. J. Miller
- Harold Frearson (1880– ) married, with Water Supply Department, lived at Collie, later Katanning, Victoria Park
- Reginald Ball Frearson (11 February 1883 – ) married Ruth; with National Bank, Gnowangerup, later Kondinin
- Archibald Robert "Archie" Frearson (1885– ) married Annie Irene ( – 18 March 1934) lived Dowerin
- (William) Allan Frearson (5 March 1887 – ) married; lived at Tammin
- Clement Cooke Junction Frearson (1889– )
- Eleanor Beatrice "Ellie" Frearson (26 December 1891– ) married J. S. McKay, lived Goomalling
- Olive Evaline Frearson (18 September 1894 – )

- Robert Sands Frearson (c. 1853 – 26 January 1937) married Hannah Cottingham (1855 – 1941) in 1876

- Harriet Evaline Frearson (1876– ) married William Charlie Holmes Schirmer ( – ) in 1923
- Robert Sands Frearson (1878–1944)
- Thomas Frearson (1882– )
- John Leslie Frearson (1884– ) married Ethelberta James (died August 1919) on 25 March 1911
- Albert Edward Frearson (1885–1927)
- Annie Ethel Frearson (1887– ) married William Edmund Phillips in 1924
- Samuel Clifford Frearson (1888–1957) married Margaret Alexander ( –1972) in 1917
- Dorothy Hilda Atkin Frearson (1897– )

- Francis Alfred Frearson ( – 1854)

== Publications ==
Illustrated periodicals

- The Pictorial Australian began as The Illustrated Adelaide News (1874 (Note: It supplanted The Illustrated Adelaide Post, primarily intended for settlers to send "back home" to England. It is not known what connection or agreement existed between publishers of similar publications for one to follow the other seamlessly.)–1880) merged with Frearson's Illustrated Weekly (1878–1880) to become Frearson's Monthly Illustrated Adelaide News (1880–1884), then The Pictorial Australian (1885–1895) with a continued numbering sequence.

Most issues of Frearson's Monthly Illustrated Adelaide News from Sixth Year No. 10 of 1 October 1880 to Tenth Year No. 12 of 1 December 1884 have been digitized by the National Library of Australia, and may be accessed using Trove.
Most issues of The Pictorial Australian from Vol XI No 1. (New Series) of 1 January 1885 to Vol XXI Nos. 10, 11, 12 of October, November and December 1895 have been digitized by the National Library of Australia, and may be accessed using Trove.

Other publications

- Atlas of South Australia "Containing 26 coloured maps" price £1 10s. (1876)
- The Land We Live In (1878)
- A series of Almanacs with various titles

- Frearson's Illustrated Pocket Diary and Almanac for South Australia, 1877, followed by editions for 1878 and 1879.
- Frearson's Book Almanac 1880 "with map of South Australia and plan of Adelaide, price sixpence" which, judging by the advertisements, may have been printed by the Kapunda Herald.
- Frearson's Guide and Almanac new editions 1883 (hailed as "much improved"), 1884, 1885, 1886 "containing 176 pages of useful information. Calendars for 1886-7, the New Tariff, Rise and Fall of Tides, Railway, Tram, and Mail Tables, Post-Office and Telegraphic Information, Railway Map, Plan of the City, Views of Streets, Public Buildings, Towns in South Australia, Sporting Information, Parliament, Law, Clubs, Institutions, Societies, Governors, &c., &c., &c. Price, 1s."
- Western Australian Guide and Almanac for 1897–8. Published by Robert S. Frearson. Robert S. Frearson was another brother; he moved to Western Australia in 1891 to manage the firm's Perth office.
- Adelaide Guide and Almanac 1906 produced by Robert S. Frearson, and intended for visitors to the city. A 1908 edition was also published.

- Frearson, Robert Sands (1901), Robert S. Frearson's guide and handbook to the land & products of South Australia : containing the following useful information, how to obtain government land, what the soil will grow, what pays best, and showing the facilities for disposing of the products; also, views and a plan of South Australia, Robert Sands Frearson
- Frearson, Robert Sands (1902), R.S. Frearson's views of Adelaide old and new, 1836 & 1902, Robt. S. Frearson
- Frearson, Robert Sands (1905), The Transcontinental Railway : its construction and alternate routes from Port Darwin through South Australia to Sydney; Port Darwin through Queensland to Sydney, Robt. S. Frearson
- Curtis, Leonard Samuel (1908), The history of Broken Hill : its rise and progress / compiled and edited by Leonard Samuel Curtis, Frearson's Printing House
