= Kent Russell =

American writer

- Occupation: Author

Kent Russell is an American writer. He has written books and magazine pieces, with essays appearing in such publications as GQ Magazine, Harper's Magazine, n+1, The Believer, and The New Republic.

== Career ==
Russell is best known for his debut book, I Am Sorry to Think I Have Raised a Timid Son. A collection of Russell's essays, the book documents his personal journey as a child. In 2015, Russell was recognized in Refinery29's list of "21 New Authors You Need to Know."

In July 2020, Russell published his second book, the nonfiction In the Land of Good Living: A Journey to the Heart of Florida. Reviewing for The Atlantic, writer Lauren Groff called the book "brilliant," adding, "I've never read an account of our gorgeous and messed-up state that is a more appropriate match of form and function. The spirit of Don Quixote presides over its buddy-trip plotline... This feels like both the real and the true story of Florida."

Russell has also contributed to GQ Magazine, n+1, Harper's Magazine, The Believer, and The New Republic. Russell was also a finalist for Brooklyn Public Library's Eagles Prize. In 2015, Russell was recognized in Refinery29's list of "21 New Authors You Need to Know."

== Personal ==
Russell's sister is fellow writer Karen Russell. He lives in Brooklyn, New York.

== Interviews ==
- NPR
- Salon Magazine
- South Florida
- Signature

== Bibliography ==
Russell, Kent (2020). In the Land of Good Living: A Journey to the Heart of Florida. Knopf Doubleday Publishing Group. ISBN 9780525521389. 2020.

Russell, Kent (9 February 2016). I Am Sorry to Think I Have Raised a Timid Son. Knopf Doubleday Publishing Group. ISBN 9780804170444. 2015.
