= Swamplandia! =

2011 novel by Karen Russell

- Author: Karen Russell
- Cover artist: Luther D. Bradley
- Language: English
- Genre: Bildungsroman, Magic Realism, Southern Gothic
- Publisher: Knopf
- Publication date: 1 February 2011
- Publication place: United States
- Media type: Print (Hardcover, Paperback)
- Pages: 397 pp
- ISBN: 0-307-26399-1
- LC Class: PS3618.U755 S93 2011

Swamplandia! is a 2011 novel by the American writer Karen Russell. The novel is set in the Ten Thousand Islands, off the southwest coast of Florida, it tells the story of the Bigtree family of alligator wrestlers who live in Swamplandia! an alligator-wrestling theme park. Swamplandia! is Russell's debut novel. The book originated as a short story, titled "Ava Wrestles the Alligator", published in the Summer 2006 issue of the literary magazine Zoetrope: All-Story, when Russell was 24 years old, and later collected in her 2006 debut collection, St. Lucy's Home for Girls Raised by Wolves.

== Plot ==
The novel opens with the Bigtree family suffering tragedy and finding their way of life under threat. The family patriarch, Sawtooth Bigtree, has recently been confined to a floating nursing home with dementia and his daughter-in-law, Hilola Bigtree, has recently died of cancer, leaving behind a husband and three teenage children. Meanwhile, a brand new amusement park, The World of Darkness, has opened nearby on the Florida mainland. In light of plummeting attendance and mounting debts, The Chief, Hilola's husband, unveils a plan for improvements to Swamplandia!, but his son Kiwi is skeptical and suggests selling the park altogether. Having grown up on Swamplandia! himself, the Chief is adamantly opposed to abandoning his family's unique heritage and lifestyle.

The Chief's middle child, Osceola, becomes obsessed with ghosts and with occult knowledge she's gleaned from an old book, The Spiritist's Telegraph. Osceola begins to hold seances with her younger sister Ava in an attempt to contact their dead mother. Osceola's loneliness and inability to talk with her mother drives her to talk to dead "boyfriends". Osceola sometimes disappears at night leading her sister to worry that she might be possessed by spirits.

Meanwhile, Kiwi continues to clash with his father over selling Swamplandia!, and he eventually decides to leave the island in an attempt to save the theme park on his own. He finds minimum-wage employment as a janitor at The World of Darkness and eventually befriends his coworker Vijay, who helps him learn to adopt normal teenage vernacular and mannerisms. Kiwi begins to attend night school and is promoted to lifeguard. When he rescues a teenage girl, Kiwi becomes a local hero and, as a result, The World of Darkness sends him to train as an airplane pilot.

With no new tourists arriving at Swamplandia!, The Chief decides to shut the park down. He also decides to take a business trip of unspecified purpose and duration to the mainland, leaving Ava and Osceola alone on the island. One day, while clearing melaleuca plants on a remote part of the island, Ava and Osceola discover a decaying dredge boat offshore. The girls recover some artifacts and Osceola attempts to communicate with the dead crew using her Ouija board. Osceola reveals what she has learned: In the 1930s a young man named Louis Thanksgiving ran away from the abuse of his adoptive family on a farm in the midwest. Osceola confesses that she is in love with Louis' ghost and, when Osceola and the dredge disappear, Ava fears that she has run off with him.

Now alone on Swamplandia!, Ava meets the Bird Man and hires him to take her in his pole boat to find her sister. Ava and the Bird Man travel into the remote wilderness. Eventually, Ava becomes convinced that the Bird Man has no special powers and that he is taking advantage of her. When they encounter a group of drunken fishermen, Ava screams to get their attention, and the Bird Man silences her. Later, the Bird Man rapes the thirteen-year-old Ava. Eventually, Ava is able to flee the Bird Man and escape by diving into a pond where she wrestles her way out of an alligator attack. She surfaces and strikes out across the dense sawgrass marshes still miles from home.

Kiwi, meanwhile, discovers that his fiercely independent father has been working secretly at a casino, possibly for many years. Kiwi continues his pilot training and, on his first flight, notices Osceola, wearing the remains of their mother's wedding dress, stranded in the swamp. Osceola explains that she did elope with the ghost of Louis Thanksgiving, but that Louis left her at the altar. Ava, Osceola, and Kiwi are reunited with their father. As the family plans for the future, they realize that they will have to abandon Swamplandia! and move to mainland Florida, where Ava and Osceola will attend high school.

== Major characters ==
=== Ava Bigtree ===
Thirteen year-old Ava, the youngest Bigtree child, is the first-person narrator of much of the novel (the sections describing Kiwi's journey are told in the third person). Ava is a precocious but, at least initially, credulous hero, wanting to believe she is going to find her sister in the underworld with the help of the Bird Man. She is fascinated by her surroundings and provides much of the social and ecological commentary in the novel.

=== Osceola Bigtree ===
The middle sibling of the Bigtree children; Ava's older, Kiwi's younger sister. She possesses a rather kind and passive personality, and develops a passionate fascination with ghosts after she finds "The Spiritist's Telegraph" in a waterlogged library boat. Osceola is the only sibling without her own narrated chapter in the story, unless you count the chapter about Louis.

=== Kiwi Bigtree ===
At seventeen, Kiwi is the oldest Bigtree child. He is studious and academically gifted, but his isolated and self-guided education has left him unprepared for mainland life. He eventually leaves Swamplandia! to work at a rival park, the World of Darkness, in order to earn money for his family. He uses big words, which he frequently mispronounces, and, at least initially, he struggles to relate to the other teenagers he encounters on the mainland.

=== The Chief ===
Chief Bigtree is the father of Ava, Osceola, and Kiwi Bigtree. In the book, he is known by the name of Chief Bigtree, even by his children. He invented a tribal world for his family despite having no Native heritage, and has an optimistic outlook about the future of Swamplandia!

=== The Bird Man ===
A mysterious man who appears at Swamplandia! midway through the book. He claims to have magical powers and supposedly guides Ava to "the Underworld" to save her sister.

== Setting ==
The strange and mysterious Everglades form the essential element for Ava's journey to the underworld. Ten Thousand Islands is not merely alligator country, it is the uncanny river of grass, the haunting gloom in the ever-changing mangrove tunnels, peat bogs, endless sawgrass prairies, abandoned stilt houses and shell mounds left by primordial Native Americans. The swamp is the otherworldly place for Ossie to meet her ghostly boyfriend, yet it is also her and Ava's back yard. Despite her Ohio forebears, Ava is a real native of the swamp environment, like the Native Americans she is dressed to resemble. Like the Seminoles who lost their leader, when Osceola was captured by deception, under a flag of truce, a century ago, Ava is similarly betrayed. She survives because of her unique fitness in this strange environment.

Alternating between Ava's fantastic voyage in the swamp and Kiwi's struggle in his over-chilled dormitory room under The World of Darkness echos the inherent liminality of life in Florida, where land and water combine, weather and sea rise change the shapes of coasts, and the result of man-made canals and drainage projects are evident in historic droughts, invasive species and sink-holes. Both island life and life on the mainland hold dangers for motherless children, but the natural and the engineered settings are also magical and mundane worlds. Not only is the small-time carnival world of alligator wrestling over, but the new and highly automated corporate world of "family fun" is largely staffed by interchangeable teens like Kiwi. Home-schooled and well-read, Kiwi can hardly communicate with the mainland boys; even his teacher misunderstands him. Meanwhile, The Chief can barely hang onto a job promoting a tawdry sideshow of aging "beauties" in a casino, but the young and ambitious Kiwi adapts to mainland life, and rises to the status of airplane pilot, enabling him to rescue and reunite the family.

== Style ==
Karen Russell has often said that her intention, right from the title of her book, was to reflect the high spirits of the novel. In an interview on National Public Radio (NPR), she describes that the exclamation point in Swamplandia! sets the tone as well as suggesting "something about the incongruity between how badly they want this fantasy to be the reality." Russell goes on to explain that this exclamation point reflects a "manufactured enthusiasm" that comes from the family having created the Bigtree wrestling tradition, whereas in the novel, Swamplandia! is a shabby tourist attraction on a swamp.

Another feature of Russell's style noted by critics is the difference between Ava's (first person) and Kiwi's (third person) narrative: While Ava's narrative provides the fantastical and nightmarish backdrop to the novel, Kiwi's point of view is "all naïve practicality" according to Paul Di Filippo's review and provides the more 'grounded' nightmares similar to those experienced in mundane day-to-day life. His narrative also provides much of the comic relief in the story due to his inability to integrate into mainland life. Di Filippo goes on to say that Russell employs a kind of Idioglossia; a unique language only known to the Bigtrees. For example, the family names all their alligators 'Seth' and often makes surreal descriptions: "A tiny, fiery Seth. Her skull was the exact shape and shining hue of a large halved strawberry." According to Jane Ciabattari's review on NPR: "Ava's voice, which shifts fluidly from preternatural wisdom to vulnerable cluelessness, rings true to her age. Throughout the book, she dwells lovingly on the endangered beauties of South Florida's Ten Thousand Islands, from the 'glacial spires of a long oyster bed' to a 'sky-flood' of moths with sapphire-tipped wings." The author as Ava uses words in a creative and imaginative way, describing the alligators as having "icicle overbites" and the "awesome diamonds of their heads".

A New York Times critic summarizes Russell's unique style by stating that she has "honed her elegant verbal wit and fused it with the nightmare logic that makes Swamplandia! such an eccentric yet revelatory family story."

== Main themes ==
The strongest theme identified by critics and the author herself is the theme of loss, as Russell explains: "So much of the story of Swamplandia! is taken up with the girls' quest to find the ghost of their mother. Grief is a very private affair for these characters, and each member of the Bigtree family is so focused on the ghosts of the past, and their doomed, miraculous visions of the future, that they keep missing one another in the present." The death of Hilola Bigtree starts what the main character, Ava, describes as "The Beginning of the End" and summarizes the Bigtree family's experience after the event in two words: "we fell". Lost in their "pool of grief" each member of the Bigtree family hatches a doomed plan to save Swamplandia!: "I envisioned Hilola Bigtree's death like a pool ball break, this traumatic event happens and they all spiral off into their own pocket."

As well as being called a Bildungsroman and a Magical Realist novel, Swamplandia! has been identified by several critics as a contemporary Southern Gothic novel. Di Filippo continues with this assessment, describing the novel as an "heir to a Southern tradition of tall tales, thick descriptions, deep backstories and contrary cusses as anti-heroes."

The Southern Gothic aspect is the many references to ghosts and the disturbing character of The Bird Man. The contrast between the macabre and disturbing imagery and the comic interludes has divided critics:

Jonathan Gibbs of The Telegraph noted that: "It's a set-up as wacky as it is grim, and for a while Russell seems content to serve up a hyperactive comedy of despair, a sort of swampy Southern Gothic high on too much cheap cola."

Susan Salter Reynolds of the Los Angeles Times instead observed Russell's ability to produce conflicting emotions in the reader: "Russell pulls the rug out from under us in a rather brutal way and we are left not knowing whether to laugh and applaud or feel grateful for her survival."

Russell was influenced at a young age by the works by short story writer George Saunders (who is also recognized on the acknowledgment page of the novel) and other gothic writers, particularly Stephen King, who influenced the creation of Swamplandia! In another interview she admits that she likes to mix up genres and is reluctant to have her novel summarized under one literary tradition, in particular, the Bildungsroman tradition.

== Reception ==
Writing for The New York Times, novelist Emma Donoghue praised Swamplandia!: "Vividly worded, exuberant in characterization, the novel is a wild ride: Russell has style in spades." Donoghue continued, "If Russell's style is a North American take on magical realism, then her commitment to life's nitty-gritties anchors the magic; we are more inclined to suspend disbelief at the moments that verge on the paranormal because she has turned 'Swamplandia!' into a credible world." The Times named Swamplandia! one of the ten best books of 2011. The book was also named to the longlist for the 2011 Orange Prize for Fiction, an annual book award in the United Kingdom for female writers. Swamplandia! was one of three finalists for the 2012 Pulitzer Prize for Fiction, though no prize was ultimately awarded. The novel was one of three nominees for the inaugural Andrew Carnegie Medal for Excellence in Fiction (2012) presented by the American Library Association for the best adult fiction. Novelist Stephen King praised the novel as being: "Brilliant, funny, original . . . It's every bit as good as her short stories promised it would be. This book will not leave my mind."

Swamplandia! was ranked the sixth greatest novel of the 2010s in Paste.

== Proposed TV series ==
In October 2011, HBO announced that it was producing a half-hour television series based on Swamplandia! with Scott Rudin serving as executive producer. In November 2013, however, Russell said an HBO adaptation was not likely to happen.

== Translations ==
This book has been translated to the following languages:

- "Terra de caimans" Catalan edition, by Marta Pera Cucurell. Edicions El Periscopi. ISBN 978-84-940490-0-2
- "Tierra de caimanes" Spanish edition. Tusquets editores. ISBN 978-84-8383-433-6
- "Swamplandia" French edition. Editions Albin Michel. ISBN 2226243003.
- "Swamplandia" German Edition. Random House. ISBN 978-3-453-40971-2
- "Swamplandia" Polish Edition. Wydawnictwo Bona. ISBN 978-83-62836-54-3
- "Lodolândia!" Portuguese Edition (Portugal). Bertrand Editora. ISBN 978-97-22524-33-9
