= William Jardine Smith =

Australian writer and editor (1834–1884)

William Jardine Smith (1834 – 13 January 1884), also known as Jardine Smith, was an Australian writer and editor.

== Biography ==
Smith was born in 1834, at Stockwell. In 1852, he emigrated from Liverpool to Melbourne on the iconic steamer SS Great Britain, where he initially pursued commercial activities. Subsequently, he became a contributor to the Melbourne Punch and ultimately editor. He was also prominently connected with two short-lived and long defunct journals —the Spectator and Touchstone. Smith was also a contributor to Fraser's Magazine and The Nineteenth Century. For some years preceding his death Smith was one of the principal political leader-writers of the Melbourne Argus. He died in Melbourne on 13 January 1884, aged forty-nine years. Smith was twice married and was survived by his widow and five children. His funeral took place on 14 January 1884, he was buried at Kew Cemetery.
