= Patrick Moloney (physician) =

Irish physician and writer (1843–1904)

Patrick Moloney (1843 – 1904) was an Irish physician and writer active in Melbourne, colonial Victoria. Moloney worked as a physician at the Melbourne Hospital. He had a successful medical career and was highly regarded in his profession. In addition to medicine, he had a keen interest in literature. Moloney wrote and published several works. He also contributed to the Melbourne Punch.

A portrait of Moloney is held in the collection of the University of Melbourne Medical History Museum.
