= Karen Russell =

American writer (born 1981)

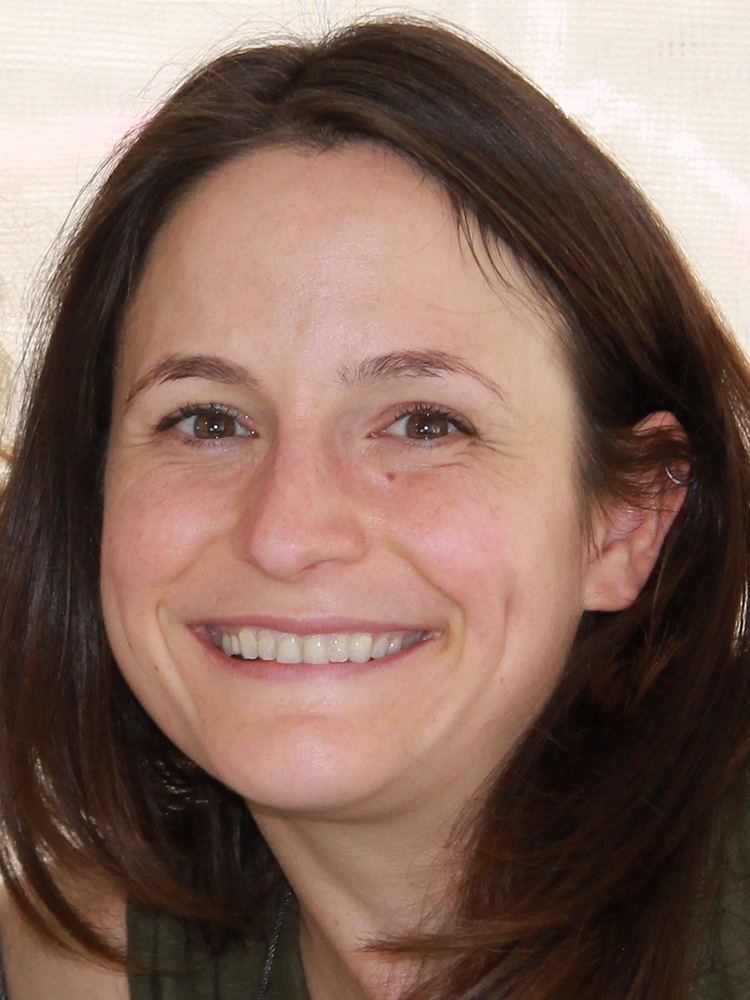
- Russell in 2011
- Born: July 10, 1981 (age 45); Miami, Florida, U.S.
- Education: Northwestern University (BA); Columbia University (MFA)
- Occupation: Writer
- Awards: 5 under 35 Honoree (2009); Guggenheim Fellow (2011); MacArthur Fellow (2013)
- Website: karenrussellauthor.com

Karen Russell (born July 10, 1981) is an American novelist and short story writer. Her debut novel, Swamplandia!, was a finalist for the 2012 Pulitzer Prize for Fiction. In 2009, the National Book Foundation named Russell a 5 Under 35 honoree. She is also the recipient of a MacArthur Foundation "Genius Grant".

== Early life and education ==
Russell was born in Miami, Florida. Her brother, Kent Russell, is also a writer.

In 1999, she graduated from Coral Gables Senior High School in Coral Gables, Florida. She received a BA in Spanish and English from Northwestern University in 2003 and an MFA from Columbia University in 2006.

== Career ==
Russell's stories have been featured in The Best American Short Stories, Conjunctions, Granta, The New Yorker, Oxford American, and Zoetrope.

She was named a National Book Foundation "5 Under 35" young writer honoree at the November 2009 ceremony for her first short story collection, St. Lucy's Home for Girls Raised by Wolves. The book also won Russell the Bard Fiction Prize in 2011. The book was a finalist for the 2007 Young Lions Fiction Award.

In 2011, Russell was awarded a Guggenheim Fellowship in Fiction.

Russell's second book and first novel, Swamplandia!, about a family of alligator wrestlers and their shabby amusement park in the Everglades, was long-listed for the 2011 Orange Prize. The novel was also included in The New York Times' "10 Best Books of 2011" and won the New York Public Library's 2012 Young Lions Fiction Award. Swamplandia! was a finalist for the 2012 Pulitzer Prize for Fiction; however, none of the three finalists received enough votes, and no prize was awarded.

Her second short story collection, Vampires in the Lemon Grove, was published by Vintage Contemporaries in February 2013. It received a starred review from Kirkus Reviews: "Here, she returns to that format with startling effect, reinforcing the uniqueness of her fiction, employing situations that are implausible, even outlandish, to illuminate the human condition … Even more impressive than Russell's critically acclaimed novel."

Russell's third short story collection, Orange World and Other Stories, was released in May 2019.

Her short story "The Hox River Window," published in Zoetrope: All-Story, won the 2012 National Magazine Award for fiction. She is the recipient of the Mary Ellen von der Heyden Berlin Prize and was awarded a fellowship at the American Academy in Berlin for Spring 2012. "Reeling for the Empire" won the Shirley Jackson Award for Best Novelette of 2012. In 2013, Russell received a MacArthur Foundation "Genius Grant."

In 2010, Russell was a visiting writer at the Iowa Writers' Workshop. She later served as an artist in residence at Yaddo in Saratoga Springs, NY. In Fall 2013, Russell was a distinguished guest teacher of creative writing in the MFA program at Rutgers University-Camden. Russell held the Endowed Chair in Creative Writing at Texas State University’s MFA program from 2017 through 2020. She has also taught at Columbia University, Bryn Mawr College, and University of California, Irvine.

In March 2025, her second novel, The Antidote, was released by Random House. Kirkus Reviews gave the book a starred review: "A singular, haunting vision that fearlessly excavates the past and challenges the reader to face the future head-on. A storytelling tour de force that lives up to the promise of its name." The novel won the 2026 Pacific Northwest Book Award. It was shortlisted for the 2025 National Book Award for Fiction and a finalist for the 2025 National Book Critics Circle Award for fiction. It won the 2025 Endeavour Award for a distinguished science fiction or fantasy book by a Pacific Northwest writer.

In 2026, Russell started a job with Stanford University as a creative writing professor.

== Personal life ==
A Miami native, she later moved to Portland, Oregon, with her husband, editor Tony Perez, and two children. She currently resides in the San Francisco Bay Area.

== Bibliography ==
=== Novels ===
- Swamplandia!. Knopf. 2011. ISBN 9780307263995.
- The Antidote. Random House. 2025. ISBN 9780593802250.

=== Short fiction ===
Collections

- St. Lucy's Home for Girls Raised by Wolves. Knopf. 2006. ISBN 9780307263988.
- Vampires in the Lemon Grove: Stories. Knopf. 2013. ISBN 9780307957238.
- Orange World and Other Stories. Knopf. 2019. ISBN 9780525656135.

Novellas

- Sleep Donation. Vintage Books. 2020. ISBN 9780525566083.

Stories

| Title | Year | First published | Reprinted/collected |
|---|---|---|---|
| St Lucy’s Home for Girls Raised by Wolves | 2006 | Russell, Karen (April 3, 2006). "St Lucy's Home for Girls Raised by Wolves". Granta. Vol. 93. | |
| A family restaurant | 2011 | Russell, Karen (Fall 2011). "A family restaurant". Conjunctions. 57. | Russell, Karen (2013). "A family restaurant". In Henderson, Bill (ed.). The Pushcart Prize XXXVII : best of the small presses 2013. Pushcart Press. pp. 183–206. |
| The Graveless Doll of Eric Mutis | 2013 | Russell, Karen (February 20, 2013). "The Graveless Doll of Eric Mutis". Electric Literature. No. 40. | Russell, Karen (2013). Vampires in the Lemon Grove: Stories. Knopf. ISBN 9780307957238. |
| The Bad Graft | 2014 | Russell, Karen (June 2, 2014). "The Bad Graft". The New Yorker. | The Best American Science Fiction and Fantasy 2015. Mariner Books. 2015. |
| Sleep donation : a novella | 2014 | Sleep donation : a novella. Atavist Books. 2014. | |
| The Prospectors | 2015 | Russell, Karen (June 1, 2015). "The Prospectors". The New Yorker. | |
| The Bog Girl | 2016 | Russell, Karen (June 20, 2016). "The Bog Girl". The New Yorker. Vol. 92, no. 18. pp. 60–69. | |
| Orange World | 2018 | Russell, Karen (May 28, 2018). "Orange World". The New Yorker. | |
| The Ghost Birds | 2021 | Russell, Karen (October 4, 2021). "The Ghost Birds". The New Yorker. | |

=== Non-fiction ===
- Russell, Karen (November 23, 2015). "Helping hand : robots, video games, and a radical new approach to treating stroke patients". Annals of Medicine. The New Yorker. Vol. 91, no. 37. pp. 44–56.

== See also ==
- Proving Up (opera)
