= The Illustrated Adelaide Post =

Newspaper in South Australia

The Illustrated Adelaide Post was a monthly publication, January 1867 – December 1874, published by W. A. Cawthorne, with issues appearing the week before departure of the English mail ship, clearly for new arrivals wanting to keep friends and relations "back home" informed. and printed by W. C. Sims (c. 1842–1923) of Gawler Place, Adelaide and his partner Joseph Elliott (c. 1833–1883), previously of the South Australian Register's general printing office, and later owner of The Southern Argus, in 1867.

Although described as "South Australia's first entirely local, fully illustrated, newspaper", it was characterised by the South Australian Register, among other deficiencies, as having only the first and last pages dedicated to local news, the rest being identical to The Illustrated Melbourne Post.

The paper was not a success, and from 1875 was incorporated into a local edition of The Australasian Sketcher with Pen and Pencil

Trove has digital copies from March 1867 (featuring a picture of the Old Gum Tree) freely available.
