= Tom Carrington (illustrator) =

Australian illustrator (1843–1918)

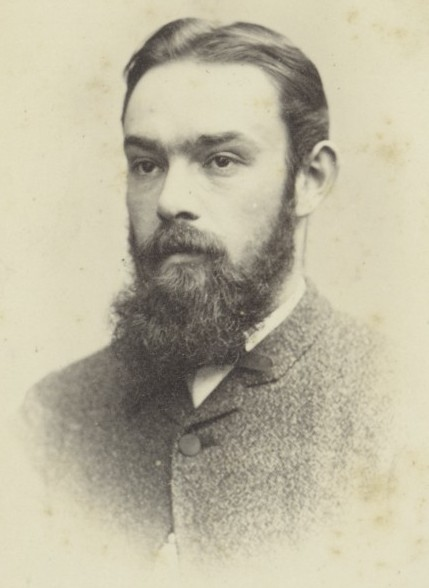
- Tom Carrington, aged in his mid-twenties.
- Born: Francis Thomas Dean Carrington; 17 November 1843; London, UK
- Died: 9 October 1918 (aged 75); Toorak, Victoria, Australia
- Occupations: political cartoonist, illustrator, journalist
- Writing career
- Pen name: 'Leonardo', 'Ixion'

Signature
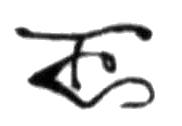

Francis Thomas Dean Carrington (17 November 1843 – 9 October 1918) was an English-born Australian political cartoonist, illustrator and journalist.

Carrington was born in London and emigrated to Australia as a young man. As a cartoonist he was most active from 1867 to 1887 as the principal artist for Melbourne Punch. His featured illustrations were noteworthy as incisive critiques of the protectionist liberal faction of colonial politicians in their campaigns against their establishment opponents, in line with the conservative political stance of the proprietors of Punch. Carrington also contributed illustrations to the monthly magazine, The Australasian Sketcher. In June 1880, he was one of four newspapermen present at the capture of the bushranger Ned Kelly at Glenrowan and his writings and illustrations are a vivid and important record of the associated events. In December 1887, Carrington was engaged by The Argus newspaper as the head of the artistic staff for its illustrated publications, the weekly The Australasian and the monthly Australasian Sketcher. He contributed illustrated articles on a variety of subjects to the Argus stable of publications using several pseudonyms. As photographs began to replace illustrations his contributions were more often written only, increasingly in the field of theatre and art reviews. He remained as head of the pictorial department at The Australasian until his death in October 1918.

== Biography ==
=== Early years ===
Francis Thomas Dean Carrington was born on 17 November 1843, in London, the second child of the medical practitioner Dr. George Carrington and his wife Mary Ann (née Green). The family lived in Duke Street, Manchester Square in Marylebone, London.

Carrington was educated at the City of London School and King's College. He studied drawing at the South Kensington School of Art and also spent some time in Lille in France. The celebrated artist and caricaturist, George Cruikshank, was a friend of his father and "took a great interest" in Carrington's studies and gave him "a great deal" of information and advice.

Carrington began his professional career with the publishers Clarke and Co., of Paternoster Row in London, and his first illustration to appear in print was a title-page to one of Thomas Mayne Reid's novels.

After reading "a sensational story of Australian life", Carrington "turned his thoughts" toward visiting Australia. When his father father died c. 1862, he set on the plan.

=== Australia ===
Carrington emigrated to Australia in 1863, probably aboard the clipper ship Suffolk which arrived at Melbourne on 9 September 1863.^{[A]}

Soon after his arrival Carrington proceeded to the Wood's Point gold diggings on the Goulburn River, north-east of Melbourne. After only moderate success at finding gold, with intervening "dull periods", Carrington took on other jobs to make a living, becoming "by turns a sawyer, a builder, a surveyor and a sign-board painter". In Australia he became known as 'Thomas' or 'Tom', by which he was known for the remainder of his life. From Wood's Point Carrington followed reports of new gold-rushes in the Victorian high country, at Jericho and Jordan on the Jordan River and further east at Crooked River and the nearby Grant gold-fields.

At Starvation Creek, near Crooked River, Carrington became snowed in for seven days and nearly died of hunger. After exhausting his supply of flour, in desperation he ate the flour bag. After that Carrington determined to kill and eat his dog, "but the animal, with a sagacity which did him credit, read what was passing in his master's mind, and took his departure". After "the hapless gold-seeker" returned to Crooked River in an exhausted state, "he was laid up with ague for a month". When he recovered "Carrington determined to give up his digger's life, and accordingly returned to Melbourne and civilisation".

Carrington's first published work was for the Australian Journal, illustrations which the artist later called his "juvenile artistic atrocities".

=== Melbourne Punch ===
In 1866, Carrington brought some of his drawings to Jardine Smith, the editor and proprietor of Melbourne Punch, a weekly illustrated magazine of humour and satire. One of the drawings was accepted for publication, beginning the artist's association with the journal of more than twenty years. Carrington's first drawing, 'The Mayor's Fancy Ball', was published in the issue of 13 September 1866. His drawings for a series called 'Nursery Rhymes to Suit the Times' commenced on 1 November 1866. Prior to the 1880s, and the advent of photo-engraving techniques, the method commonly used for the reproduction of images in newspapers and magazines was wood engraving, whereby the artist drew on a block of wood which was then given to an engraver to cut recesses which corresponded to the white areas of the image. The raised surface of the wood block could then have ink applied for printing. The quality of the finished image was dependent on the skill of the engraver and the time constraints of print deadlines.

When Carrington joined the staff of Melbourne Punch the principal cartoonist for the publication was Oswald Rose Campbell, who was mainly responsible for the featured full-page illustrations on page five of the journal. By January 1867, Carrington's cartoons on a variety of subjects were being published in Melbourne Punch. Campbell left Melbourne Punch in May 1867 after which Carrington took on the responsibility of producing the full-page feature cartoon in each issue, as well as the smaller format cartoons. Carrington's feature cartoons for "Melbourne Punch" over a twenty-year period, from May 1867 to December 1887, were described as "the long fusillade of pictures that wrought such havoc in the politics of the day".

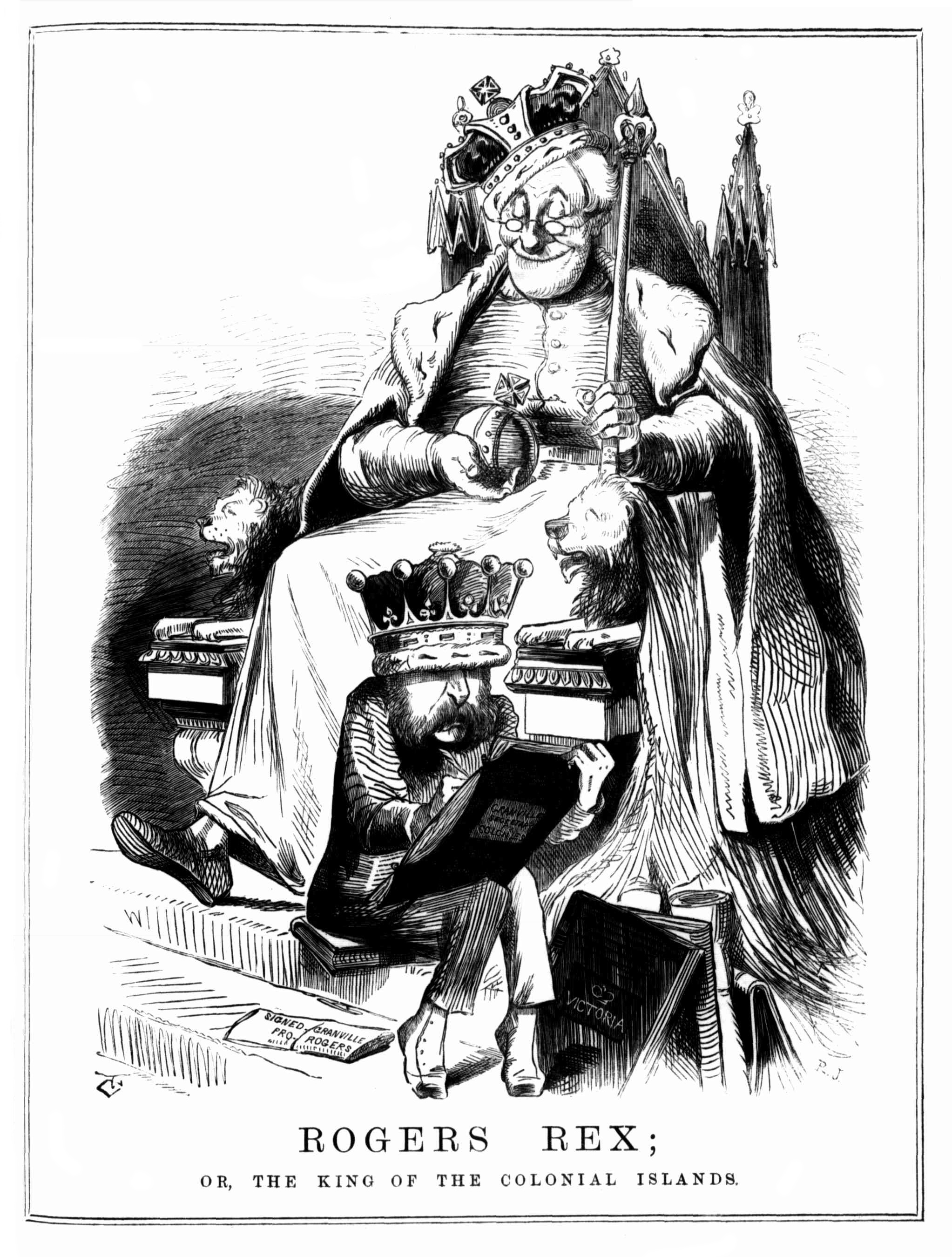
'Rogers Rex; Or, The King of the Colonial Islands', published in Melbourne Punch, 11 November 1869.

Thomas Carrington and Dorothea ('Dora') Claussen were married on 11 January 1869 in the inner Melbourne suburb of Emerald Hill. The couple had two daughters.

Carrington was an early member of the Yorick Club, a Melbourne gentleman's club formed in 1868 whose members were described as "literary men and artists". Carrington had his illustrations published in the short-lived Touchstone, published from October 1869 to October 1870.

A cartoon by Carrington published in Melbourne Punch in November 1869, titled 'Rogers Rex; Or, The King of the Colonial Islands', was described by the historian Marguerite Mahood as an early satirical work prefiguring Carrington's later reputation as "the acknowledged 'fighting cartoonist' of the next decade". The drawing depicts Sir Frederic Rogers, the Permanent Under-Secretary of State for the Colonies in the British government since 1860, enthroned as the "King of the Colonial Islands" and described by Mahood as "sitting in stupid somnolence with his crown askew and a fatuous grin". At Rogers' feet sits Lord Granville, the ministerial Secretary of State, writing despatches on behalf of the 'King'. The cartoon and its accompanying verse (on the previous page) signifies "colonial resentment of imperial interference", an emerging grievance that was to become more widespread in the following decade.

In April 1871, Melbourne Punch was purchased by the McKinley brothers. The new owners were "staunch conservatives" who instigated a campaign in the pages of their magazine against the protectionist liberal faction that had become dominant in the Victorian Legislative Assembly. With the change in ownership and the overt adoption of an anti-liberal stance by Melbourne Punch, "Carrington's graphic satire burst into full bloom".

In 1874, Carrington and James Eville, a writer and occasional editor of Punch, collaborated in adapting and localising a pantomime for performances in Melbourne during the Christmas and New Year pantomime season. The pantomime, which premiered at the Theatre Royal on Boxing Night, 26 December 1874, was originally written by John Strachan and was titled Humpty-Dumpty (Who Sat on the Wall), or, Harlequin King Arthur, His Three Sons, the Princess Roseleaf, the Knights of the Round Table, and the Fairy of the Fern Tree Gully.

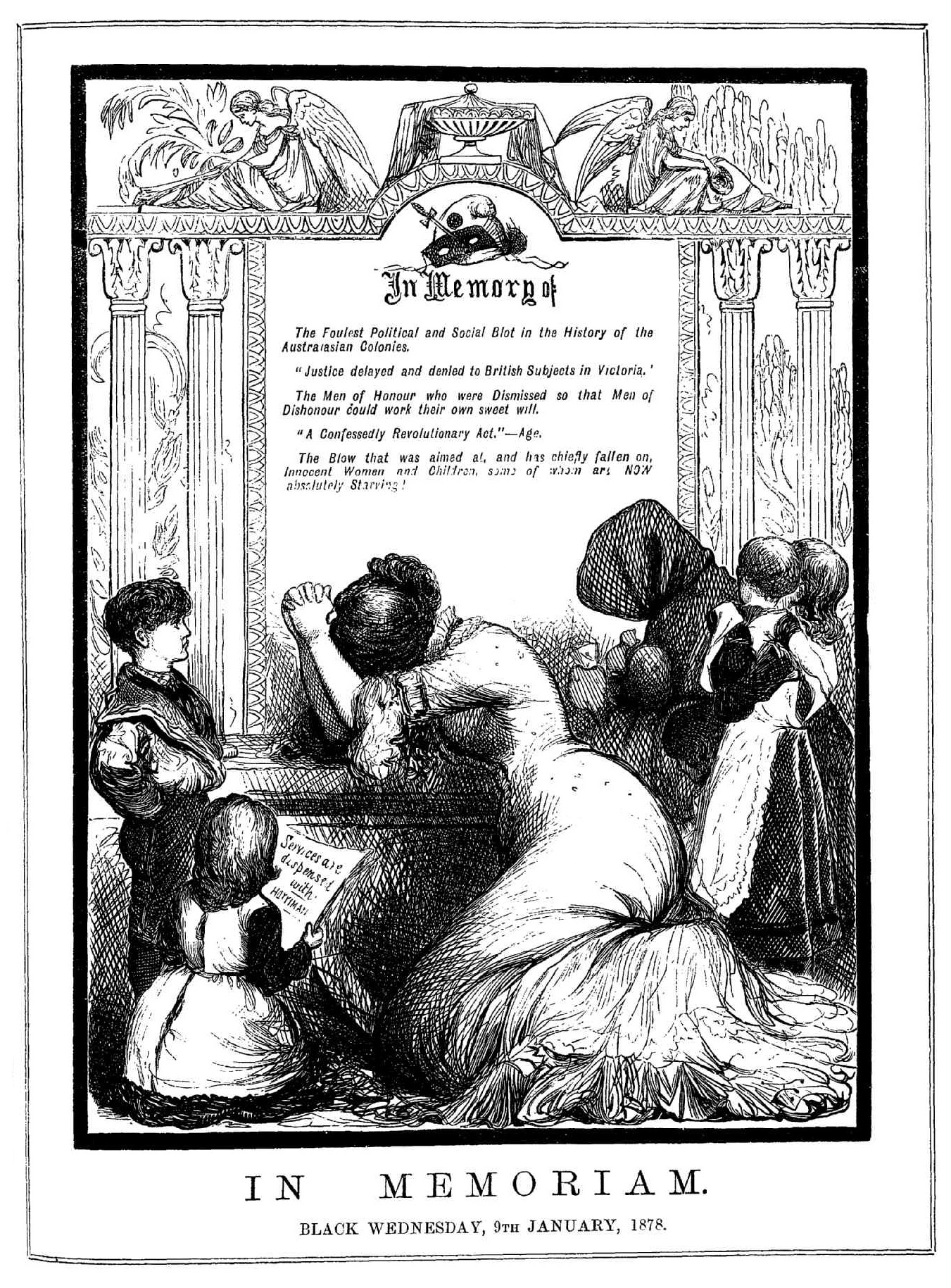
'In Memoriam', published in Melbourne Punch, 16 May 1878.

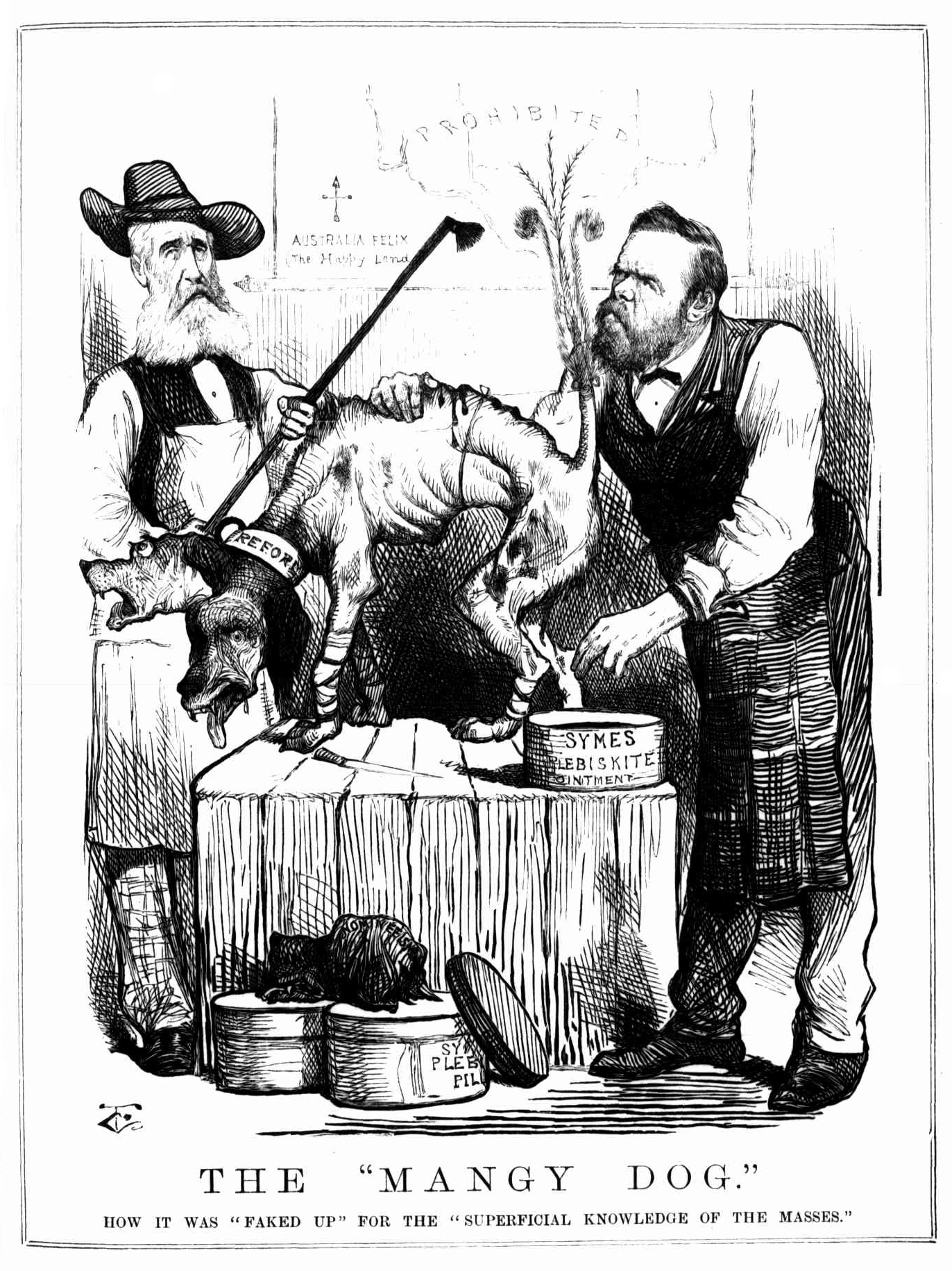
'The Mangy Dog' featuring caricatures of Graham Berry and David Syme, published in Melbourne Punch, 12 February 1880.

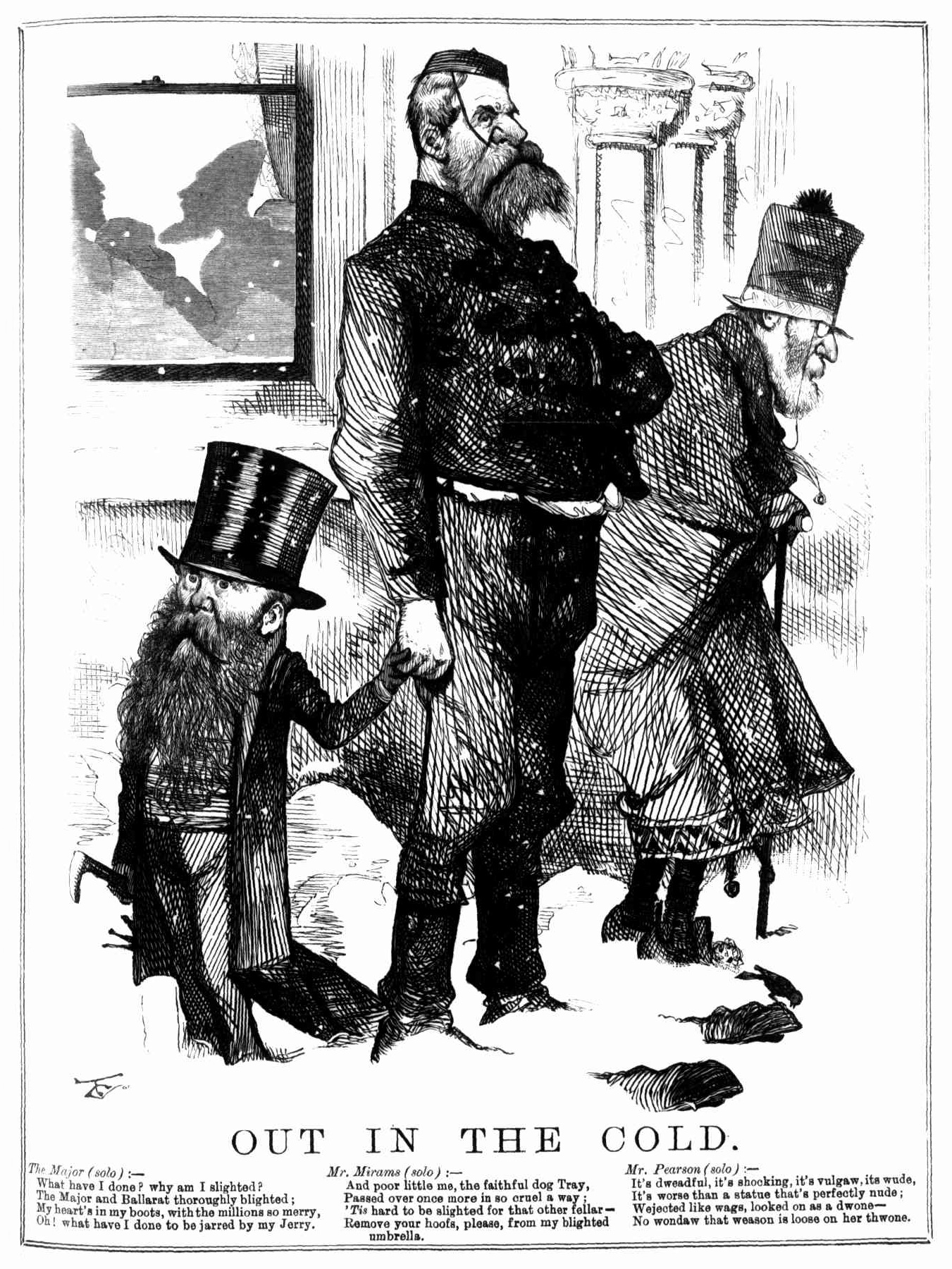
Ousted politicians Bryan O'Loghlen, James Mirams and Charles H. Pearson: 'Out in the Cold' (Melbourne Punch, 15 March 1883).

Carrington also occasionally wrote for Melbourne Punch under the pseudonym 'T. C.'. In February and March 1876, a serialised satirical story by Carrington was published entitled 'Never! Never!! Never!!! or, The Pincers of the Wretched Premier', with a character named Gayman Beery (a thinly-disguised Graham Berry, previously the Premier of Victoria with aspirations, at that stage, to another term).

Carrington's 'In Memoriam', published on 16 May 1878 referred to the rejection by the Victorian Legislative Council in January 1878 of the government's Appropriation Bill for the payment of salaries of the colony's civil servants.

Carrington provided illustrations for the publication of a serialised novel, 'Two Wives' by N. Walter Swan, in The Sydney Mail and New South Wales Advertiser from 27 December 1879 to 7 February 1880.

Carrington "made his reputation in the old fighting days of politics" when Graham Berry "was leading his famous crusade against Conservatism". His cartoons documenting the political fortunes in Victoria of Berry and his protectionist or liberal party from 1875 to 1881 was described as "his greatest work". Through his drawings the peculiarities and mannerisms of the politicians of the day "were made as well known in the streets as in the lobbies of Parliament". Carrington's familiarity with "the literary, artistic, theatrical and political men of the period" ensured that "what he put into his drawings was always calculated to 'touch the spot'". The demand was so great for Carrington's cartoons that they were issued by Punch in special supplements, The History of the Berry Ministry (December 1879) and The Decline and Fall of the Berry Ministry (March 1880).

After Berry's government was defeated at the polls in February 1880 a testimonial was raised by public subscription and presented to Carrington "whose pictures have unquestionably done much to throw deserved ridicule upon the now defunct Ministry".

While Carrington was on the staff of Melbourne Punch, he also contributed to The Australasian Sketcher, a monthly illustrated magazine that commenced in 1873.

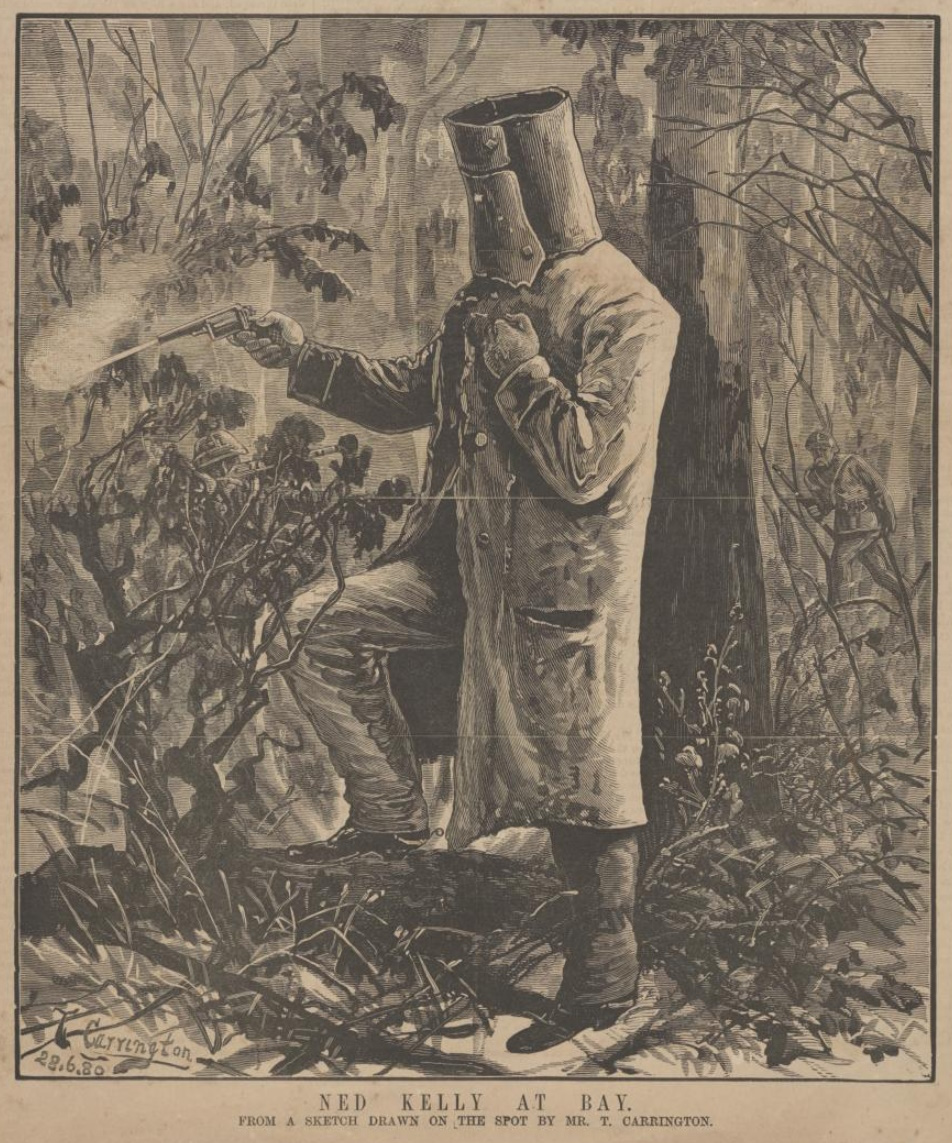
'Ned Kelly at Bay' "from a sketch drawn on the spot" by Tom Carrington; from the cover of Australasian Sketcher, 3 July 1880.

On 27 June 1880, word reached Carrington that the bushranger Ned Kelly and his gang "had broken out again and shot a man". Carrington, with nine policemen, five Aboriginal trackers and three other pressmen, left Melbourne by a special train late on Sunday night and arrived in the early hours of Monday morning at Glenrowan, in north-east Victoria near the Warby Ranges. The newspapermen who accompanied Carrington were George Allen (Melbourne's Daily Telegraph), John McWhirter (The Age) and Joseph D. Melvin (The Argus). The Kelly gang were holding hostages in the Glenrowan Inn near the railway station. The journalists remained at the station under cover during the initial exchange of fire between the police and the outlaws and gave first aid to Superintendent Hare after he was wounded on the wrist. At daylight police reinforcements from Wangaratta arrived at the scene "and considerably strengthened the cordon around the inn". As the journalists were watching the scene around the besieged hotel from the western end of the station they suddenly noticed a couple of the men turning away from the inn and begin "firing at something in the bush". Carrington then saw "a very tall figure... stalking slowly along in the direction of the hotel". Unbeknownst to the police Ned Kelly, seriously wounded, had left the inn during the night and hid in the bush until dawn. At daybreak Kelly dressed in his armour and, with three handguns, emerged from the bush and attacked the police from their rear. Carrington wrote a vivid description of the ensuing gunfight. He described the figure as it first emerged "in the dim light of morning, with the steam rising from the ground", as having the appearance of "the ghost of Hamlet's father with no head, only a long thick neck". As the armoured figure advanced, "shot after shot was fired at it, but without effect, the figure generally replying by tapping the butt end of his revolver against its neck, the blows ringing out with the clearness and distinctness of a bell in the morning air". As Kelly moved towards "a dip in the ground near some white dead timber" he was brought down by "a man in a small round tweed hat" (Sergeant Steele) who fired at the outlaw's legs, "firing low two shots in quick succession". After Kelly fell, as Carrington wrote: "The spell was then broken, and we all rushed forward to see who and what our ghostly antagonist was".

Carrington's article 'Catching the Kellys: A Personal Narrative of One Who Went in the Special Train' was published in The Australasian on 3 July 1880, describing his journey by train to Glenrowan, the siege and capture of Kelly and the burning of the inn. His illustrations, based on sketches made at the scene, were published in the July issue of The Australasian Sketcher, featuring a drawing on the cover of Ned Kelly in his armour, one leg propped upon a fallen log, firing at the police with his revolver. Carrington's detailed drawings also included depictions of Kelly's armour, Ned Kelly lying on the bunk in the station-master's house, the general scene at night of the besieged inn and the bodies of gang members Joe Byrne on the floor of the inn and Dan Kelly and Steve Hart engulfed in flames. Carrington's written descriptions and published images of the events at Glenrowan have proven to be highly influential and "underpin the way Ned Kelly is remembered in Australian history and cultural mythology".^{[B]}

In about 1880, Carrington purchased a third share in Melbourne Punch, together with brothers Alexander and James McKinley. About a year later he sold his share and entered into a partnership with James McKinley and Edmund Finn (another Punch staff-member) to start a newspaper called the World, the first issue of which was published on 20 November 1881. The World was short-lived, however, and soon afterwards Carrington sold his share. During this venture he had maintained his connection with Melbourne Punch and after extricating himself from the World, Carrington once again purchased a part share of Punch from the proprietor, Alexander McKinley.

Carrington illustrated 'The Man and the Law: In Three Pictures' by Francis Myers, published in two parts in The Sydney Mail on 23 and 30 December 1882.

Carrington's final cartoon for Melbourne Punch was the full-page 'The Good Santa Claus' (subtitled "The Ministerial Man of Ice Still Fills The Stockings of His Obedient Little Children"), published on 22 December 1887, which featured a caricature of the Victorian Premier, Duncan Gillies, as Santa Claus, together with members of his cabinet. A coalition of the Conservative and Liberal parties had held office in Victoria since February 1883. In February 1886 both parties elected new leaders, Duncan Gillies (Conservative) and Alfred Deakin (Liberal), under whose leadership the coalition was re-elected in March 1886.

=== The Argus publications ===
Carrington left Melbourne Punch in December 1887 and was engaged by The Argus as the head of the artistic staff for its illustrated publications, the weekly The Australasian and the monthly Australasian Sketcher. Carrington's wife, Dora, had worked as a journalist for The Australasian since about 1885. Her columns and articles, published under the name 'Queen Bee', were often incorporated in 'The Ladys Page'. Dora Carrington became the Social Editor of The Australasian and continued to write for the newspaper until her death in January 1918, recording society events and writing "upon subjects of feminine interest". In her last years Mrs. Carrington was "assisted in her journalistic duties by her elder daughter, Dora".

In September 1888, an article about Carrington in Table Talk estimated that the artist was earning "an income of £1500 to £2000 per annum" and his illustrations had been published in a number of international magazines including The Illustrated London News, London Punch and L'Illustration.

In April 1890, Carrington commenced a semi-regular feature in the weekly Australasian newspaper using the pseudonym 'Ixion'. His 'Ixion' contributions consisted of articles complemented by illustrations (and in later years photographs). His first feature, 'An Artist's Notes on "Paul Jones"', was an extensive review, with illustrations, of the comic opera Paul Jones. Carrington's 'Ixion' articles and illustrations were a regular feature in The Australasian from mid-July 1890 to July 1893, dealing with a variety of subjects. The 'Ixion' articles resumed again in January 1894, often accompanied by illustrations and photographs. During 1895, the articles became less frequent, appearing fortnightly or monthly. After 1896 Carrington's 'Ixion' articles became increasingly infrequent with the final one being published in August 1911. Carrington also used the pseudonym 'Ixion' for occasional articles published in The Argus in the period 1906 to 1908.

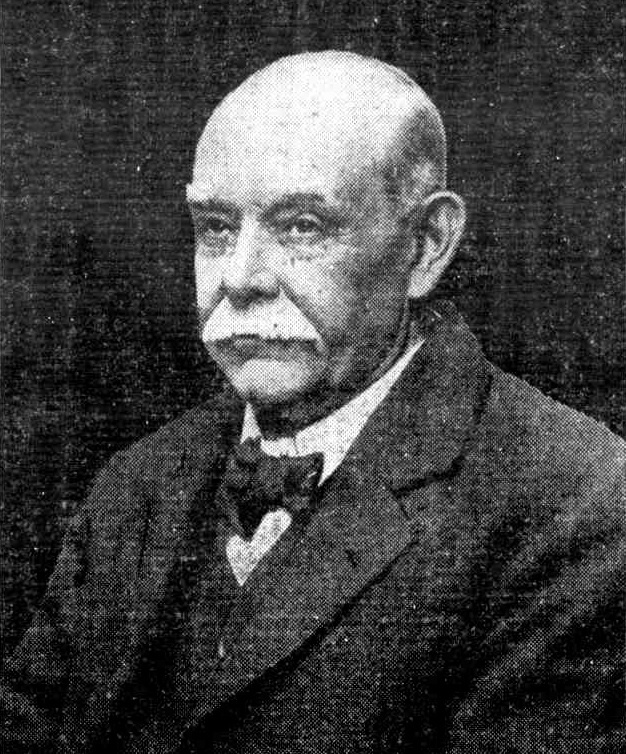
Carrington in 1918

From March 1894, Carrington began to write a column under the pseudonym 'Leonardo' in the Saturday issue of The Argus. His columns included "smart skits in dialogue on Society fads". Carrington's occasional 'Leonardo' column continued until January 1897. It was said of Carrington that "he wrote with a facile pen, and humour was ever bubbling out of him".

Carrington designed an invitation (on behalf of the Commonwealth government) to be sent to those selected to witness the opening of the first Australian parliament after Federation, held on 9 May 1901 in the Royal Exhibition Building in Melbourne. The coloured invitation card, printed by Sands and McDougall Limited, featured an allegorical tableau inspired by the first verse of Rudyard Kipling's 'Commonwealth Ode' (the text of which was included on the invitation). The image depicted a young woman (Australia) wearing armour dismounting from a white horse in front of an older woman representing Britannia, looked upon by six other young women, representing each of the Australian states. The socialist newspaper The Tocsin was scathing of Carrington's design, describing it as "blatant jingoism": "It is a clumsy tawdry picture, over-balanced with heavy decorative stage scenic effect, and inspired by Kipling's drivel on the Old Queen and the Young Queen". The writer added that "Kipling's ideas have been rendered more ridiculous in the stealing".

Carrington remained as the head of the pictorial department at The Australasian "up to the time of his last illness". In his later years he was also a commentator on theatre and was one of the earlier Australian art critics for news periodicals, writing for The Argus.

=== Death ===
Carrington's wife Dora died on 3 January 1918 in Melbourne. She had been in failing health for several years before her death.

Thomas Carrington died from pneumonia on 9 October 1918, aged 75, at his residence in Iona Avenue, in the Melbourne suburb of Toorak. He was buried in the Brighton General Cemetery.

== Publications ==
- Marcus Clarke (1869), Long Odds: A Novel, Melbourne: Clarson, Massina & Co.; illustrated by Thomas Carrington.^{[C]}
- Alexander McKinley (1883), Punchialities, Melbourne: Alex. McKinley & Co.; illustrations by Thomas Carrington.
- George Bell (editor), with contributions by Thomas Carrington and D. Watterston (1911), The Yorick Club: Its Origin and Development, May 1868 to December 1910, Melbourne: Atlas Press.
- Thomas Carrington (2003), Ned Kelly: The Last Stand, Written and Illustrated by an Eyewitness (edited and with an introduction by Ian Jones), South Melbourne: Lothian Books.

== Gallery ==
A selection of images by Tom Carrington
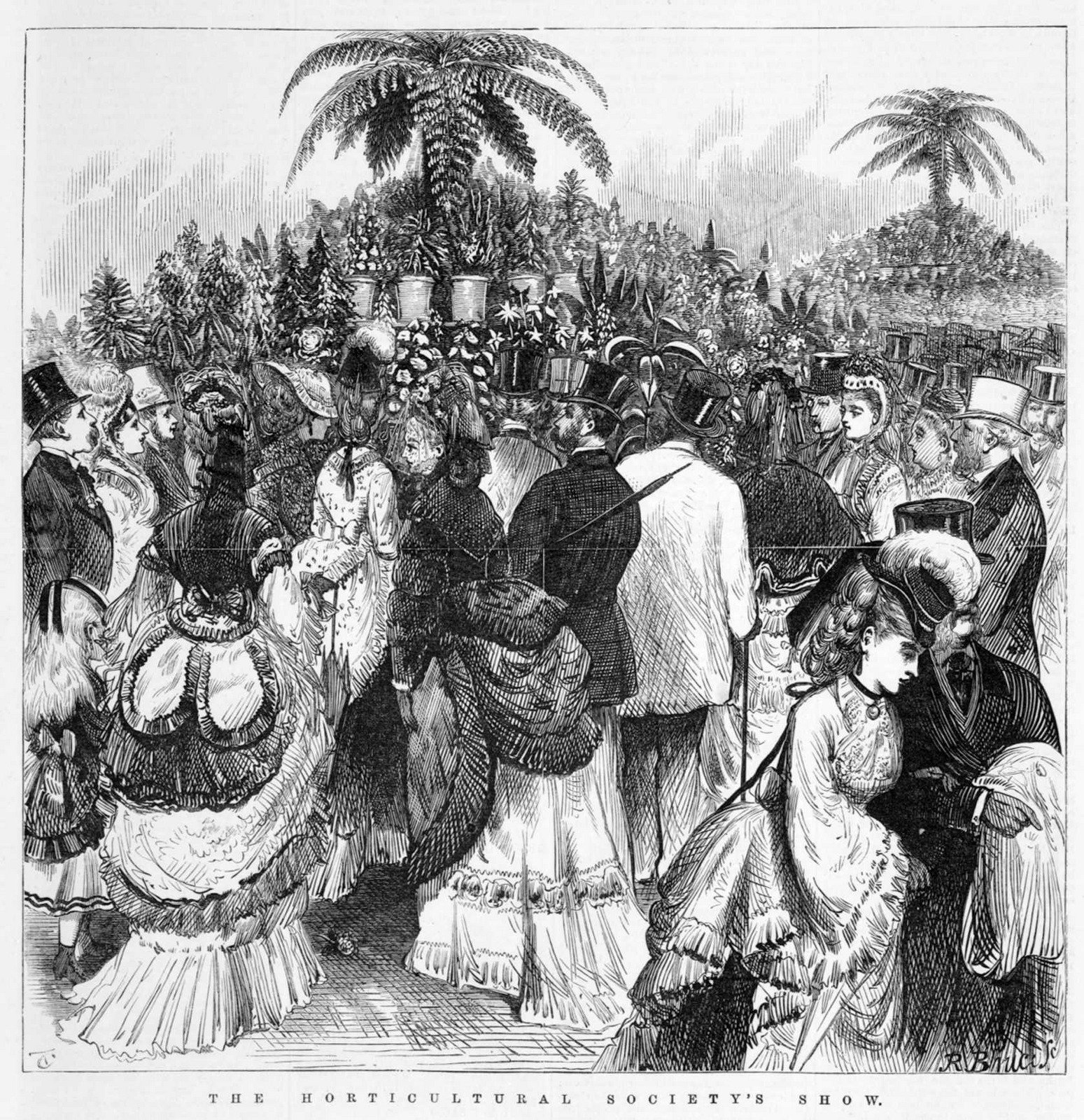
'The Horticultural Society's Show', wood engraving by Thomas Carrington and Robert Bruce, published in The Illustrated Australian News for Home Readers, 5 December 1872.

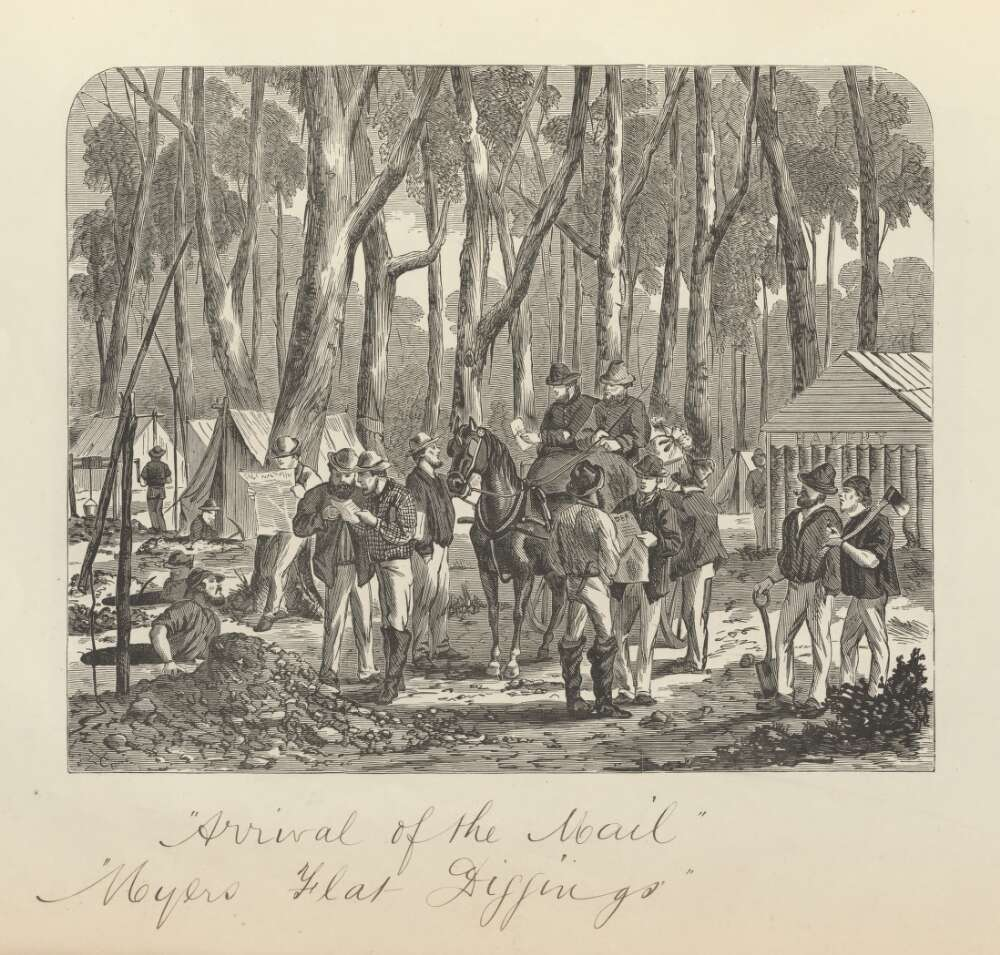
'Arrival of the Mail, Myers Flat Diggings', a wood engraving print exhibited by the Commissioners of the International Exhibition in London in 1873.

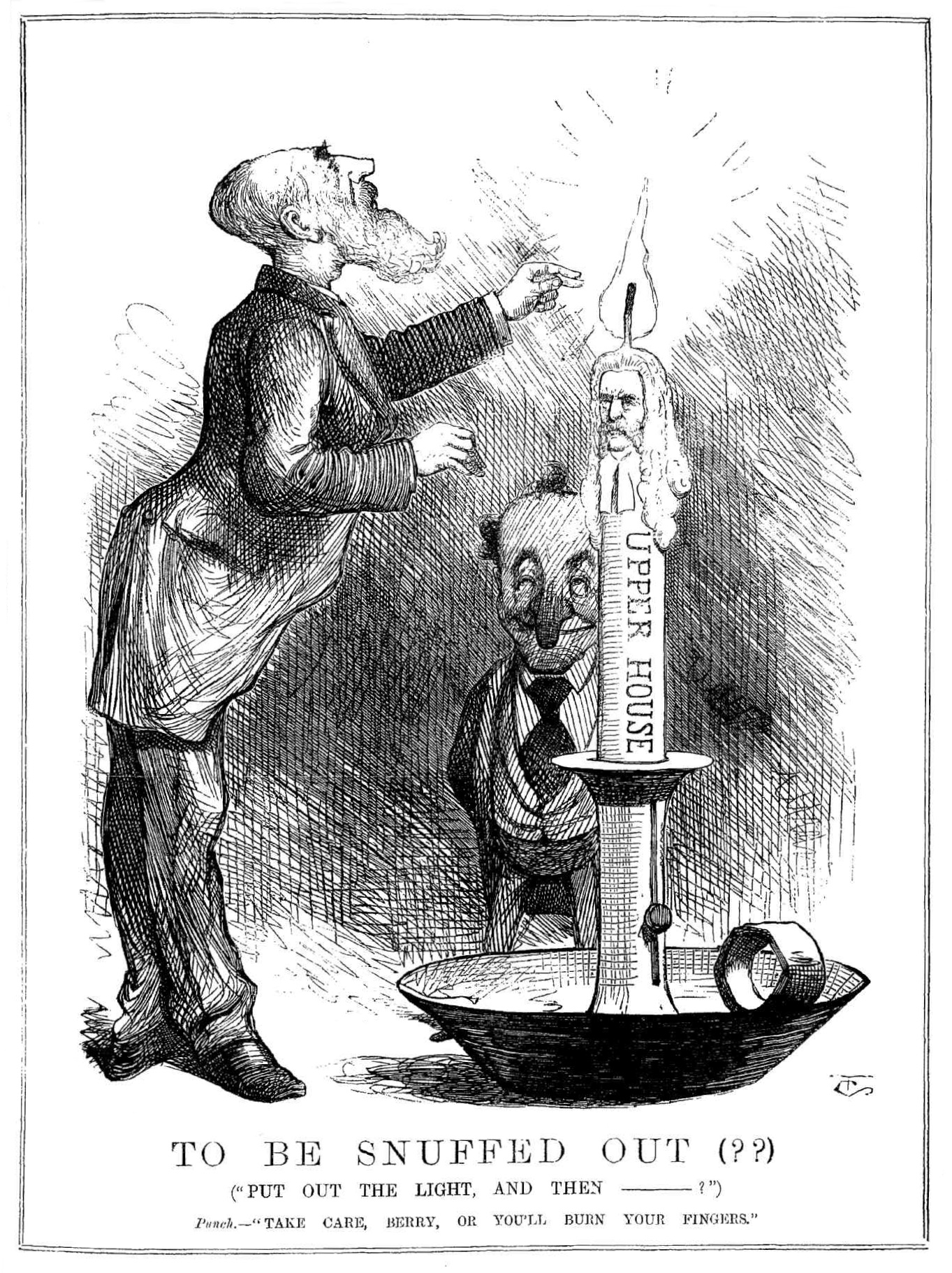
'To Be Snuffed Out (??)' featuring a caricature of Graham Berry, published in Melbourne Punch, 18 July 1878.

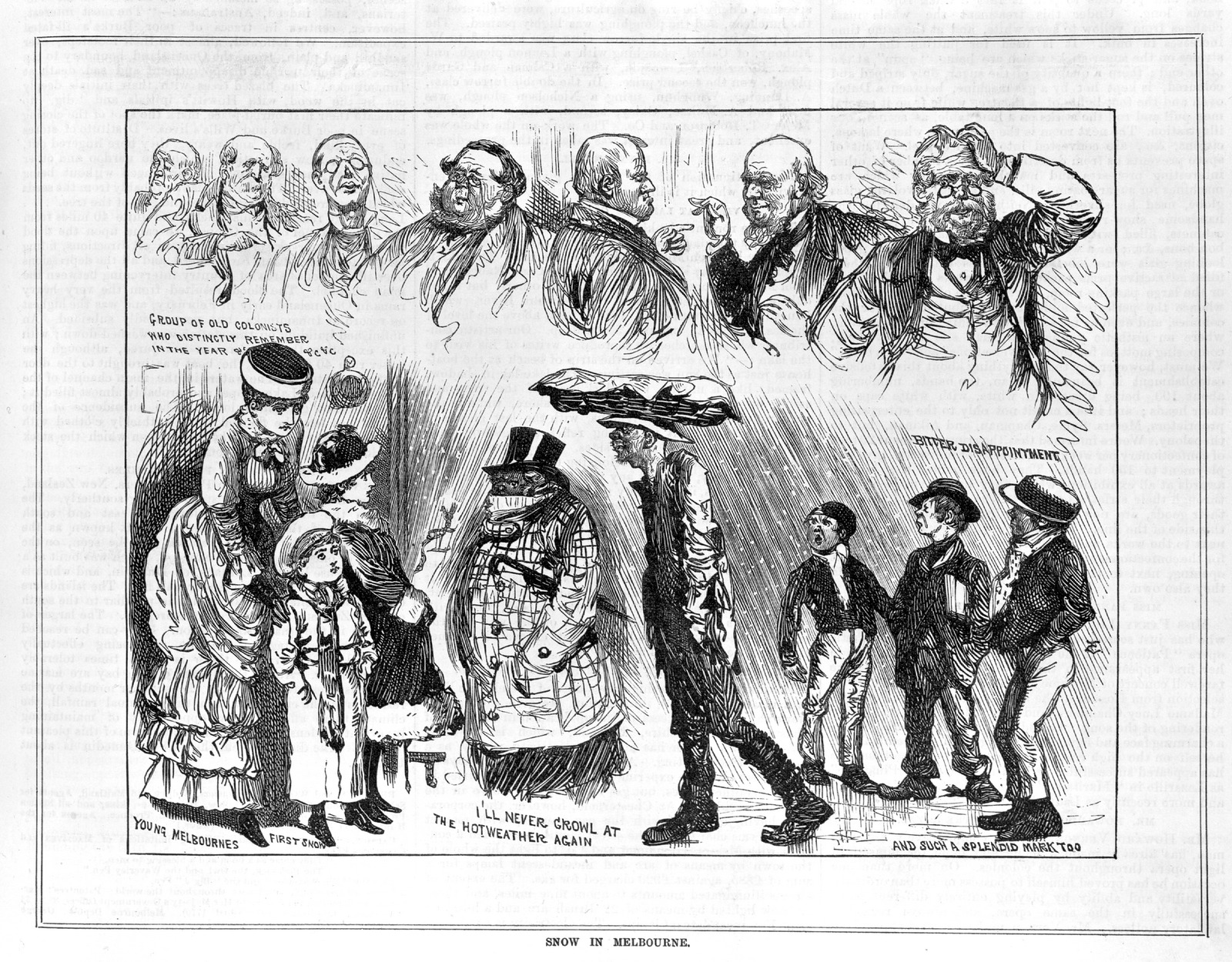
'Snow in Melbourne', published in Australasian Sketcher on 12 August 1882.

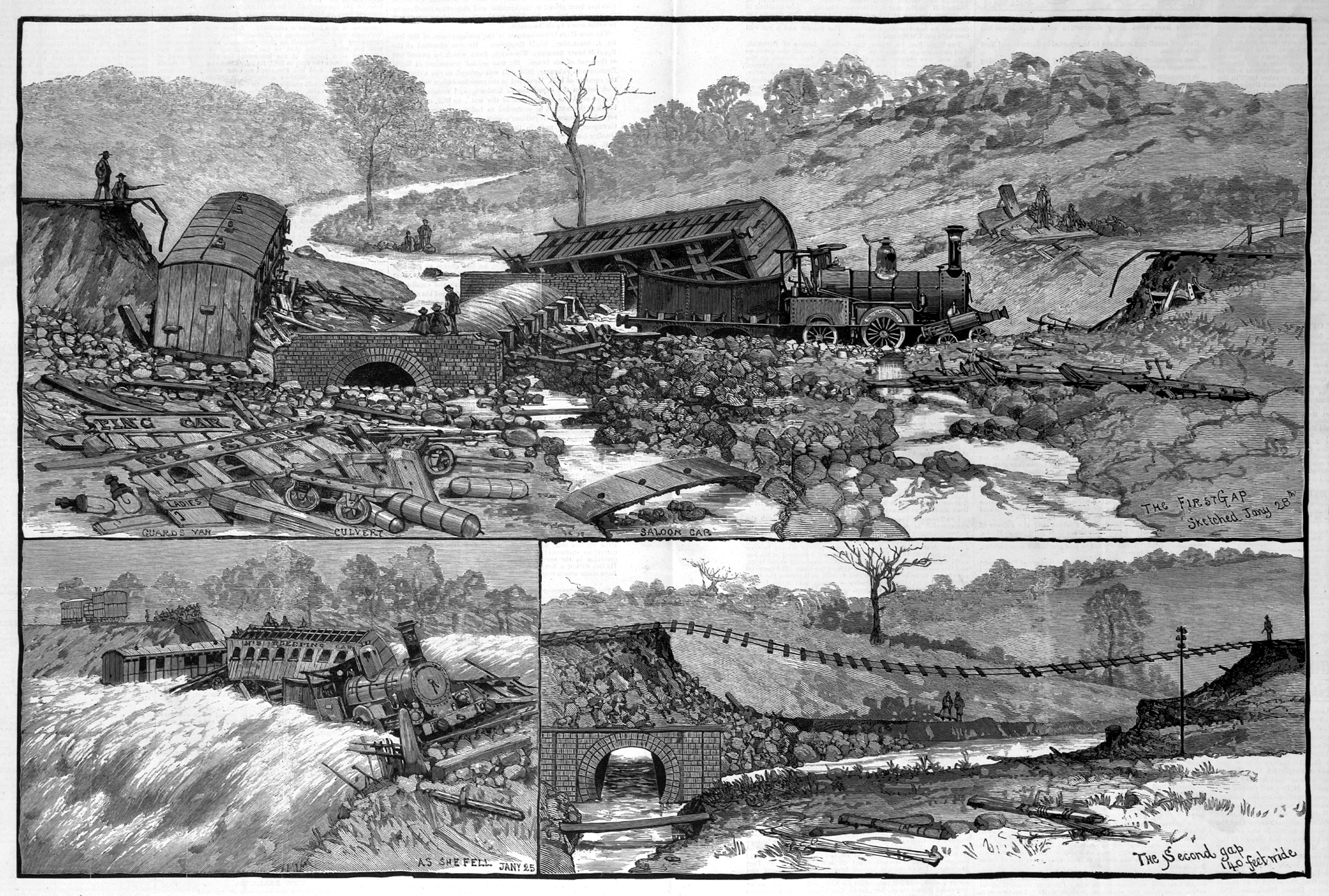
'The terrible railway accident at Cootamundra' a wood engraving taken from sketches by Tom Carrington, published in Australasian Sketcher, 11 February 1885.

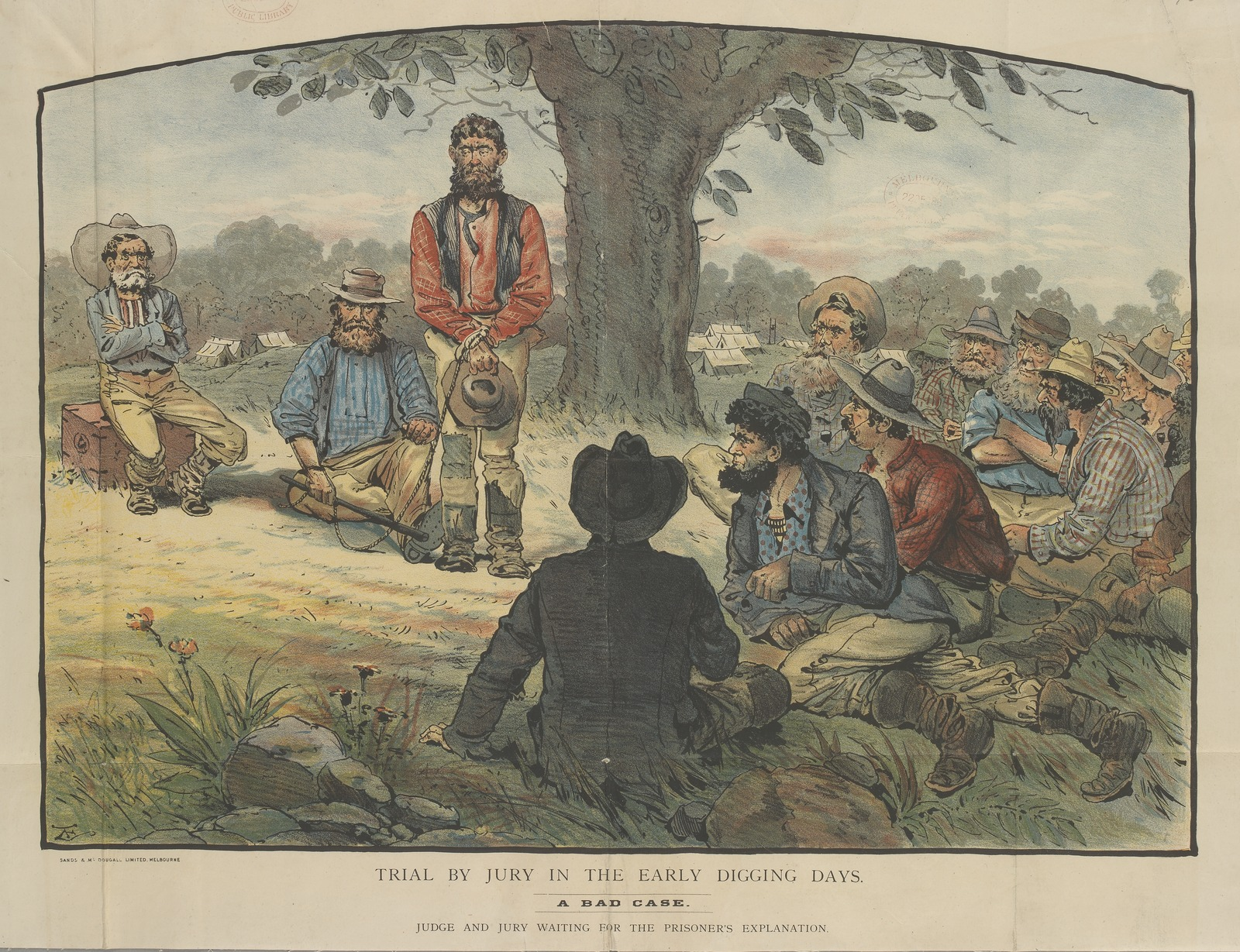
'Trial by Jury in the Early Digging Days', published by Alfred Martin Ebsworth of Melbourne in December 1886.

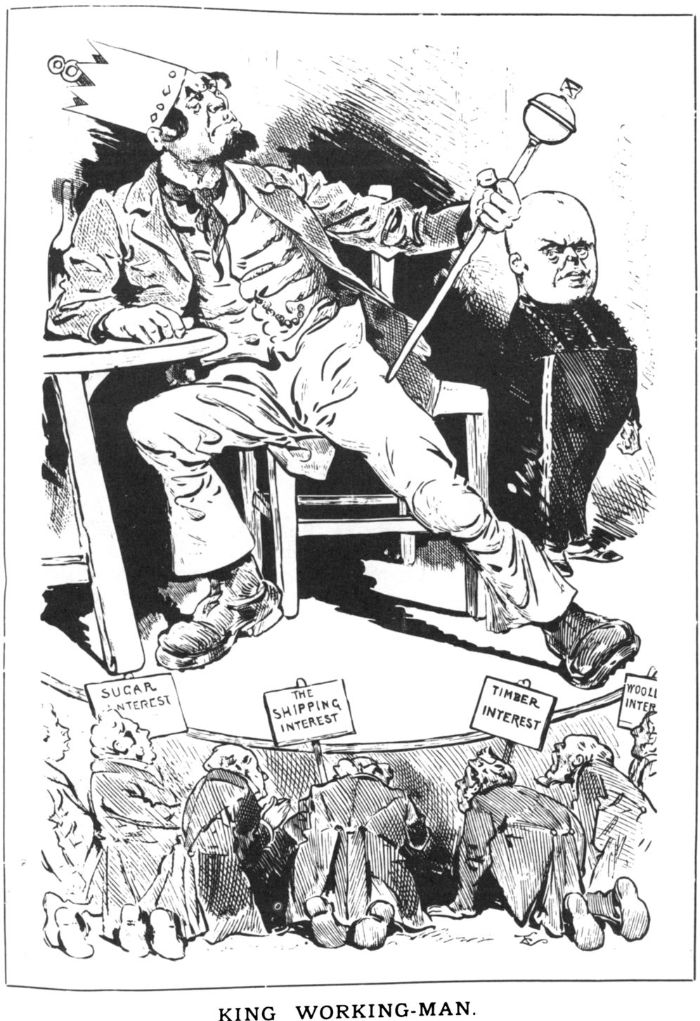
'King Working-man', published in 1887.

== Notes ==
A.The evidence for the date of Carrington's arrival in Australia is from an article in 1888 in Melbourne's Table Talk newspaper, which states that he "arrived at the same time as Sir Charles Darling, on 11 September 1863". Charles Henry Darling was appointed Governor of the colony of Victoria in 1863, and served in that role from September 1863 to May 1866. Darling arrived in Melbourne aboard the Suffolk, which docked at Hobson's Bay in Port Phillip on 9 September 1863. If Carrington arrived "at the same time" as Darling, the assumption is that Carrington also arrived on the Suffolk.

B.On 7 June 1881 Carrington gave evidence at the Police Commission into the conduct of the Victorian police during the outbreak of the Kelly gang.

C.Long Odds was originally serialised in Colonial Monthly: An Australian Magazine during 1868-9.
