= Clint (name) =

Clint is both a given name and a surname. Notable people with the name include:

Given name:

- Clint Alberta (1970–2002), Canadian filmmaker
- Clint Albright (1926–1999), Canadian ice hockey player
- Clint Alfino (born 1968), South African baseball player
- Clint Amos (born 1983), Australian rugby league player
- Clint Auty (born 1969), Australian cricketer
- Clint Bajada (born 1982), Maltese presenter
- Clint Barmes (born 1979), American baseball player
- Clint Benedict (1892–1976), Canadian ice hockey goaltender
- Clint Black (born 1962), American country singer and musician
- Clint Boon (born 1959), English musician and radio presenter
- Clint Boulton (1948–2021), English footballer
- Clint Bowyer (born 1979), NASCAR racecar driver
- Clint Capela (born 1994), Swiss basketball player
- Clint Catalyst (born 1971), American author, actor, model, and spoken word performer
- Clint Daniels (born 1974), American singer
- Clint Dempsey (born 1983), American soccer player
- Clint Eastwood (born 1930), American actor and director
- Clint Fagan (born 1952), American baseball umpire
- Clint Ford (born 1976), American voiceover artist and actor
- Clint Frazier (born 1994), American baseball player
- Clint Freeman (born 1973), Australian archer
- Clint Hill (disambiguation), several people
- Clint Hocking (born 1972), Canadian video game director and designer
- Clint Holmes (born 1946), American singer and entertainer
- Clint Howard (born 1959), American actor
- Clint Hurdle (born 1957), American baseball manager
- Clint Arlen Lauderdale (1932–2009), American diplomat
- Clint Lorance (born 1984), American Army officer convicted of second-degree murder for battlefield deaths; pardoned
- Clint Madracheluib, Palauan spearfisher
- Clint Malarchuk (born 1961), Canadian ice hockey player
- Clint Mansell (born 1963), English musician and composer
- Clint McElroy (born 1955), American podcaster and former radio personality
- Clint McKay (born 1983), Australian cricketer
- Clint Ratkovich (born 1997), American football player
- Clint Robinson (baseball) (born 1985), American baseball player
- Clint Robinson (canoeist) (born 1972), Austrian canoeist
- Clint Stickdorn (born 1982), American football player
- Clint Trickett (born 1991), American football player
- Clint Walker (1927–2018), American actor and singer
- Clint Watson, Bahamian politician

Surname:

- Alfred Clint (1807–1883), English marine painter
- Alfred Clint (Australian painter) (1843–1923), cartoonist and theatrical scene painter
- Alf Clint (1906–1980), Australian Anglican priest and co-operative organizer
- Edmund Thomas Clint (1976-1983), Indian artistic child prodigy
- George Clint (1770–1854), English portrait painter and engraver
- Scipio Clint (1805–1839), English medallist and seal-engraver

== See also ==
- Clint (disambiguation)
