= Alfred Clint (Australian painter) =

Australian cartoonist and theatrical scene painter

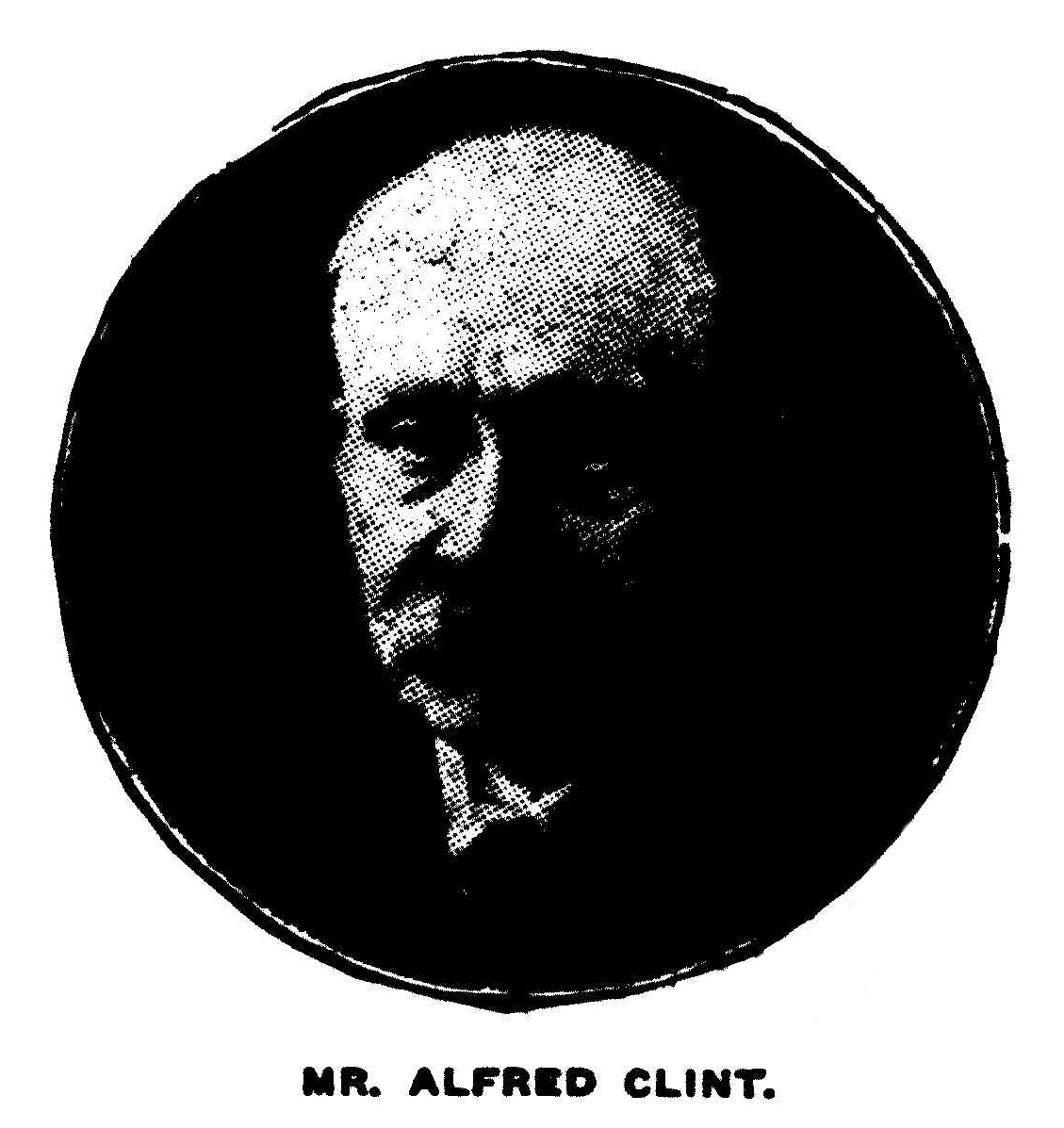
- Portrait of Alfred Clint (about 1920).
- Born: Alfred Clint; 28 August 1842; Kensington, London, England
- Died: 20 November 1923 (aged 81); Windsor, New South Wales, Australia
- Occupations: theatre scene-painter; illustrator; cartoonist; artist
- Spouse: Mary Jane Percy Lake

Alfred Clint (28 August 1842 – 20 November 1923) was an Australian theatrical scene painter, illustrator and cartoonist. He was born in England into a distinguished family of artists and emigrated to Australia in the 1860s. In 1867 Clint began working as a theatrical scene-painter as an assistant to John Hennings at the Theatre Royal in Melbourne. After several years he was working in Sydney as an established scenic artist. In 1873 he relocated to Adelaide where he also worked as a cartoonist and illustrator, developing a reputation for crowd scenes with identifiable subjects. In 1875 Clint returned to Sydney where he continued to work as a theatrical scene-artist as well as a cartoonist and illustrator. He was on the staff of Sydney Punch from 1875 to 1888 and also contributed to other publications. By the late 1890s Clint's eldest son was working alongside his father as a theatrical scene-painter. In 1919 Clint and his three sons established a scene-painting studio at Camperdown.

== Biography ==
=== Early years ===
Alfred Clint was born on 28 August 1842 in Kensington, England, the son of the landscape and marine painter Alfred Clint and grandson of portraitist George Clint.

Clint emigrated to Australia as a young man, possibly as early as 1860.

=== Scenic artist ===
By October 1867 Alfred Clint was working as a theatrical scene-painter at the Theatre Royal in Melbourne, as an assistant to John Hennings. In October 1867 he was involved in the production of new scenery for Shakespeare's Antony and Cleopatra, starring Walter Montgomery. In December 1867 Clint and John Little were listed as assistants to Henning in designing and painting "the new and magnificent scenery" for the Christmas pantomime at the Theatre Royal, Tom, Tom, the Piper's Son, and Mary, Mary, Quite Contrary (written by W. M. Akhurst).

By July 1869 Clint and John Little were assisting John Hennings in Sydney, painting the scenery for After Dark (described as "a tale of London life"), being staged at the Prince of Wales Opera House. Clint remained in Sydney after being appointed scenic artist of the Prince of Wales Opera House, where he began working on scenery for the forthcoming production of The Tempest, which opened in September 1869 and was advertised as having "entirely New, Magnificent, and Brilliant Scenery by Mr. Alfred Clint, from the Theatre Royal, Melbourne". A review of The Tempest in Sydney Punch complimented Clint's "ability he has displayed as the scenic artist... having established himself in the good opinion of the Sydney public". Several of his theatrical scenes were considered noteworthy: "The wreck of the king's ship, the surf breaking on the beach, and Prospero's cell were quite triumphs of scenic skill".

In March 1871 Clint and the theatrical mechanist John Renno presented a diorama at the Sydney School of Arts incorporating scenes of the Franco-Prussian war and views of Sydney. From December 1871 the pantomime The House That Jack Built was presented at the Prince of Wales Opera House after a highly successful season during 1870 at the Theatre Royal in Melbourne. The scenery for the Sydney production, "on the most liberal and gigantic scale... being the foundation and progress of Australia", was produced by William J. Wilson, Alfred Clint "and assistants".^{[A]}

Alfred Clint and Mary Jane Percy Lake were married in Sydney on 22 June 1872. The couple had eight children, born between 1873 and 1893.

=== Adelaide ===
Cartoon by Alfred Clint featuring various vignettes of Adelaide political character, 1874.

By March 1873 Clint had relocated to Adelaide after being engaged by Samuel Lazar as scenic artist for the Theatre Royal. In July 1873 it was written that Clint's "scenery on the stage of the Royal has won so much well-deserved admiration during the recent dramatic season".

While living in Adelaide Clint was the chief cartoonist for the short-lived weekly illustrated newspaper The Mirror, first published in July 1873. His images in the first edition included "representations of street scenes in Adelaide, and an excellent portrait of Governor Musgrave, who is exhibited as being warmly welcomed by fair Australia on his landing". Clint's cartoons were later featured in The Lantern from its first issue of 5 September 1874 until the end of 1875.

Walter R. Morton, the owner of the Southern Cross Hotel, employed Clint to paint several large watercolour pictures which included prominent citizens of Adelaide. The paintings were exhibited at the hotel, described as a "great attraction to the frequenters of the Southern Cross". Clint's paintings were in the form of detailed Adelaide street or interior scenes featuring a multitude of recognisable characters, sometimes in humorous situations. Clint's first painting for Morton depicted "a number of colonists" assembled in the interior of the Adelaide Post Office building, "and was much admired for the excellency of most of the likenesses". His second picture, publicly displayed in March 1874, depicted a street scene in King William Street as Governor Musgrave's carriage was passing. Included in the painting as spectators were "all classes of the community", numbering about one hundred, including "brokers, and M.P.'s, knights, C.M.G.'s, editors, clergymen, lawyers, publicans, and other sinners".

=== Return to Sydney ===
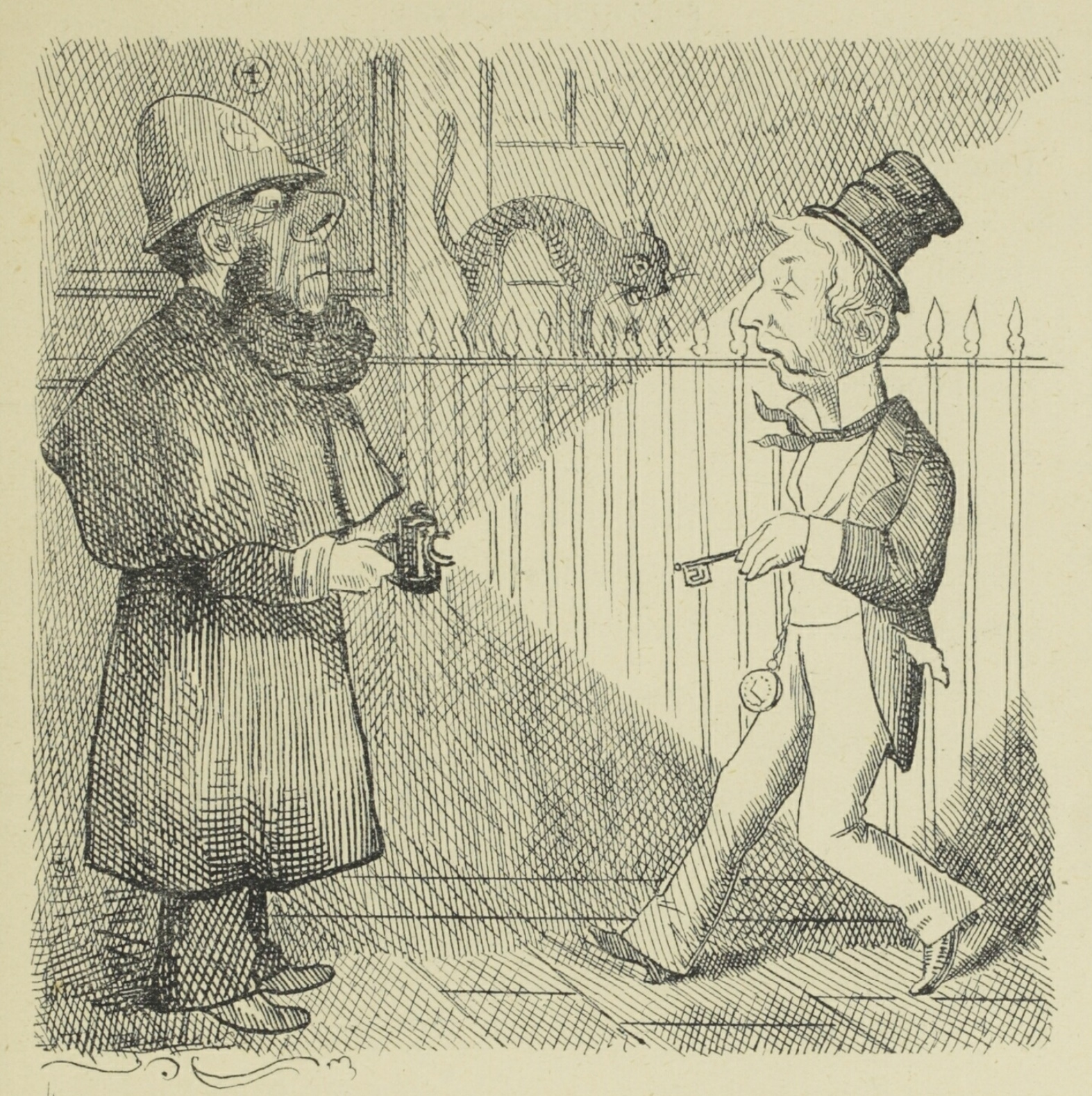
'A Night Jar', illustration from Southerly Busters by 'Ironbark' (1878).

Clint returned to Sydney by the end of 1875, where the family settled at Balmain.

Clint's illustrations became a regular feature in Sydney Punch. The first to appear was 'Athirst!', a full-page allegorical cartoon in the issue of 3 December 1875. Clint remained with Sydney Punch until its closure in 1888. For most of his time with the newspaper he alternated with E. Montagu Scott as the feature cartoonist the full-page political cartoon in each issue.

In September 1878 Clint commenced a series of illustrations for Sydney Punch titled 'People We Know'. The numbered series of portraits of unnamed subjects appeared on page one of the publication, complete with incidental details and text to enable identification of the individual. The final portrait in the series (number 132) was published in May 1881.

Clint provided the illustrations for Southerly Busters, a book of collected verse by 'Ironbark' (G. Herbert Gibson), published in 1878.

In its issue of 4 October 1879 Sydney Punch published a chromolithograph folio sheet, illustrated by Clint, as a supplement to celebrate the opening in Sydney of the International Exhibition in a purpose-built exhibition building called the Garden Palace. His drawing was a robust and detailed crowd scene, characteristic of the artist's work, representing a procession which included over one hundred recognisable colonial identities as well as representatives of other nations.

Clint was a founding member of the Art Society of New South Wales. His contributions to the Society's first exhibition in December 1880 were "eight or nine of those clever characteristic sketches of public men which he hits off so quickly and so well".

Clint was briefly employed by The Bulletin magazine in early 1883, though his cartoons do not appear after the American cartoonist Livingston Hopkins began work in May 1883, at which time the magazine was revamped with additional pages and illustrations.

In the late 1870s and early 1880s, at the height of his career as an artist of theatrical scenery, Clint was recognised as one of the four masters of scenic art in the Australian theatre alongside John Hennings, George Gordon and John Brunton. After his return to Sydney in 1875 Clint worked as the scenic artist in various theatres: the Royal Victoria, Criterion, Her Majesty's and Prince of Wales Opera House. The critic for The Australasian newspaper was fulsome in his praises for the scenery of Clint and J. R. Setright for the pantomime Amphibio, the Rhine Queen, which opened in December 1879 at the Victoria Theatre: "The scenery is in the truest sense gorgeous, and the transformation eminently lovely". From the early 1880s and into the late 1890s Clint was responsible for theatrical scenery for the productions staged by George Rignold. When the newly-built Criterion Theatre opened in 1886, the theatre's drop-scene was a painting of 'The Landing of Captain Cook at Kurnell' by Alfred Clint. The theatre critic for the Sydney Morning Herald praised Clint's scenery for Rignold's production of Julius Caesar at Her Majesty's Theatre in September 1889. The critic described Clint's "splendid scenery" as "beautifully painted", adding: "It is accurate in design, harmonious and striking in colour, and fine in effect".

Alfred Clint's three sons – Alfred (junior), George and Sydney – studied scene-painting under their father's tuition.

By the late 1890s Clint's eldest son, Alfred Clint (junior), was working with his father in the design and painting of theatrical scenery. A production of Charles Darrell's 'The Power and the Glory', staged by Charles Holloway at Melbourne's Theatre Royal in November 1899, advertised "new and superb scenery" by Clint and Edward Vaughan, assisted by "W. Little and A. Clint, jun." Darrell's melodrama opened in Sydney at the Lyceum Theatre on 23 December 1899.

From about the late 1890s Clint (senior) was described as being in less than robust health, "but he possessed a recuperative constitution and always managed to pull through". His wife, Mary Jane, died in 1918 at Burwood.

In 1919 Alfred Clint and his sons established theatrical scene-painting premises, known as Clint's Art Studios, in Grose Street, Camperdown.^{[B]}

=== Final years ===
In about May 1922 Clint's eldest son Alfred purchased a residence at Windsor, in the Hawkesbury district of north-western Sydney, where father and son lived. In his final years Clint often engaged in watercolour painting of landscapes in the neighbourhood, and was a frequent exhibitor at local exhibitions.

Alfred Clint (senior) died on 20 November 1923, aged 81, at the home of his son Alfred in Fitzgerald Street, Windsor.

== Family ==
George Clint (1770–1854) ARA portraitist

- Raphael Clint (1797–1849) lithographer and printer in Australia, returned to UK c. 1885.
- Scipio Clint (1805–1839) medal and seal engraver
- Alfred Clint (1807–1883) known for coastal landscapes
  - Alfred Clint (1842 – 20 November 1923) married Mary Jane Percy Lake (1851–1918) on 22 June 1872
    - Ada Helena Clint (1873–1958), married Frank Fox (1874–1960) on 13 June 1894.
    - Alfred Thomas Clint (27 October 1878 – 5 September 1936), married Gwendoline --; scene-painter and watercolourist.
    - Ethel Mary Clint (b. 1881), married Walter James Dale on 31 March 1905.
    - George Edmund Clint (28 July 1883 – 14 April 1952); scene-painter.
    - Beatrice M. Clint (b. 1885).
    - Eva Clint (b. 1888, died as an infant).
    - Dorothy Una Clint (b. 1889), married Edward Robinson on 15 March 1913.
    - Sydney Raphael Clint (1893 - 4 August 1930) of Blacktown; scene-painter and black and white artist.

== Gallery ==
A selection of images by Alfred Clint
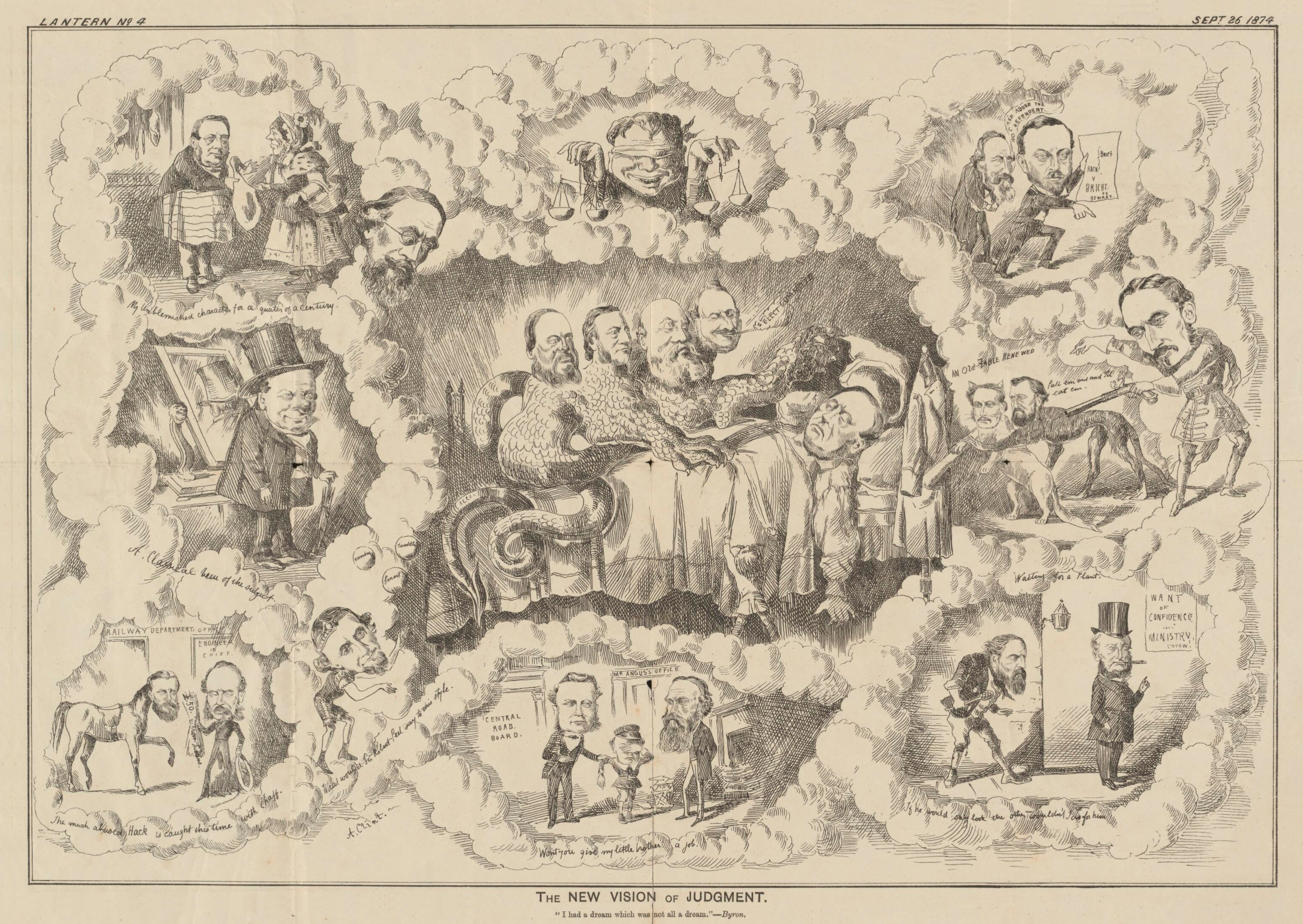
'The New Vision of Judgment', The Lantern (Adelaide), 26 September 1874.

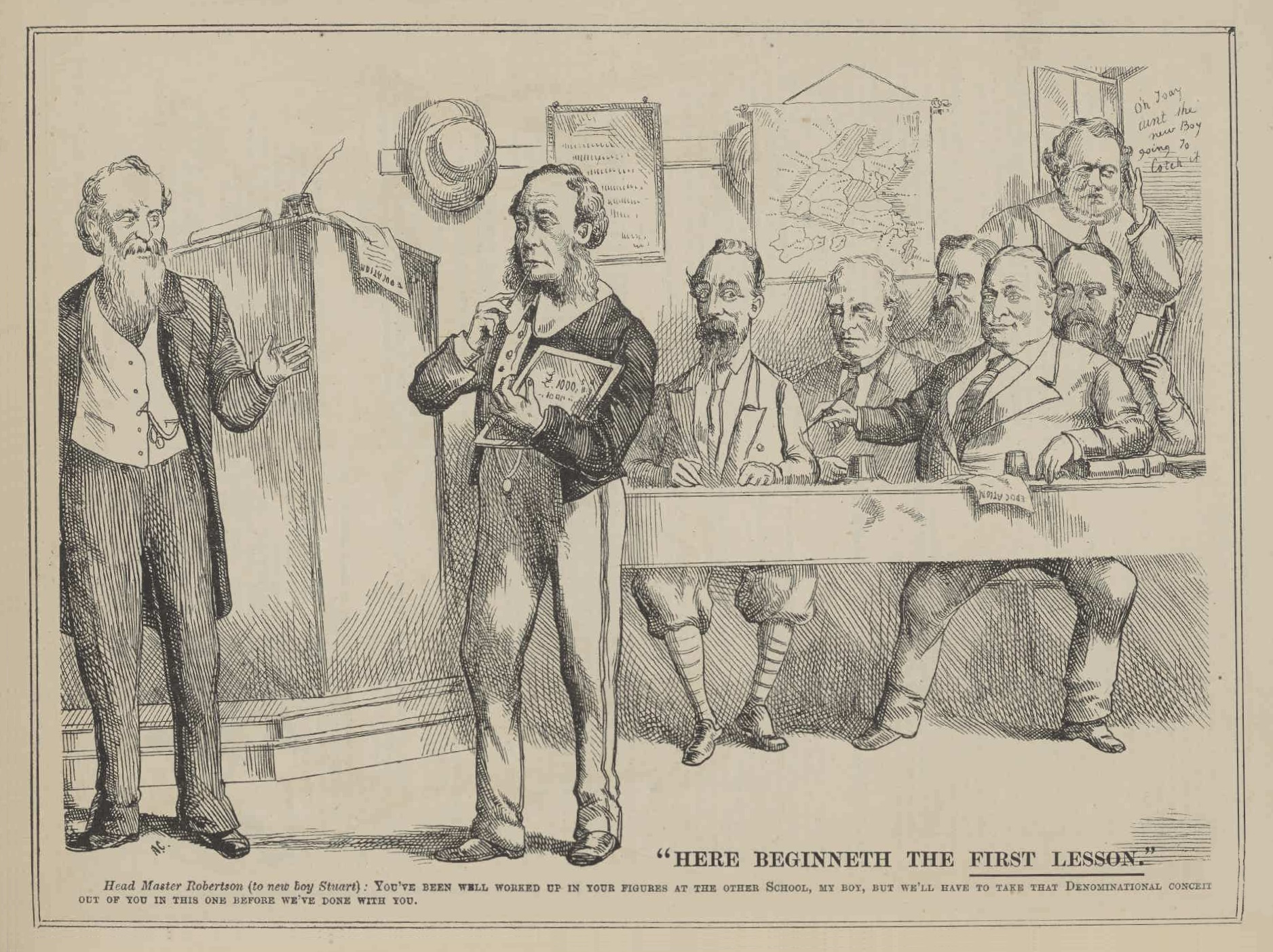
'Here Beginneth the First Lesson', published in Sydney Punch, 25 February 1876.

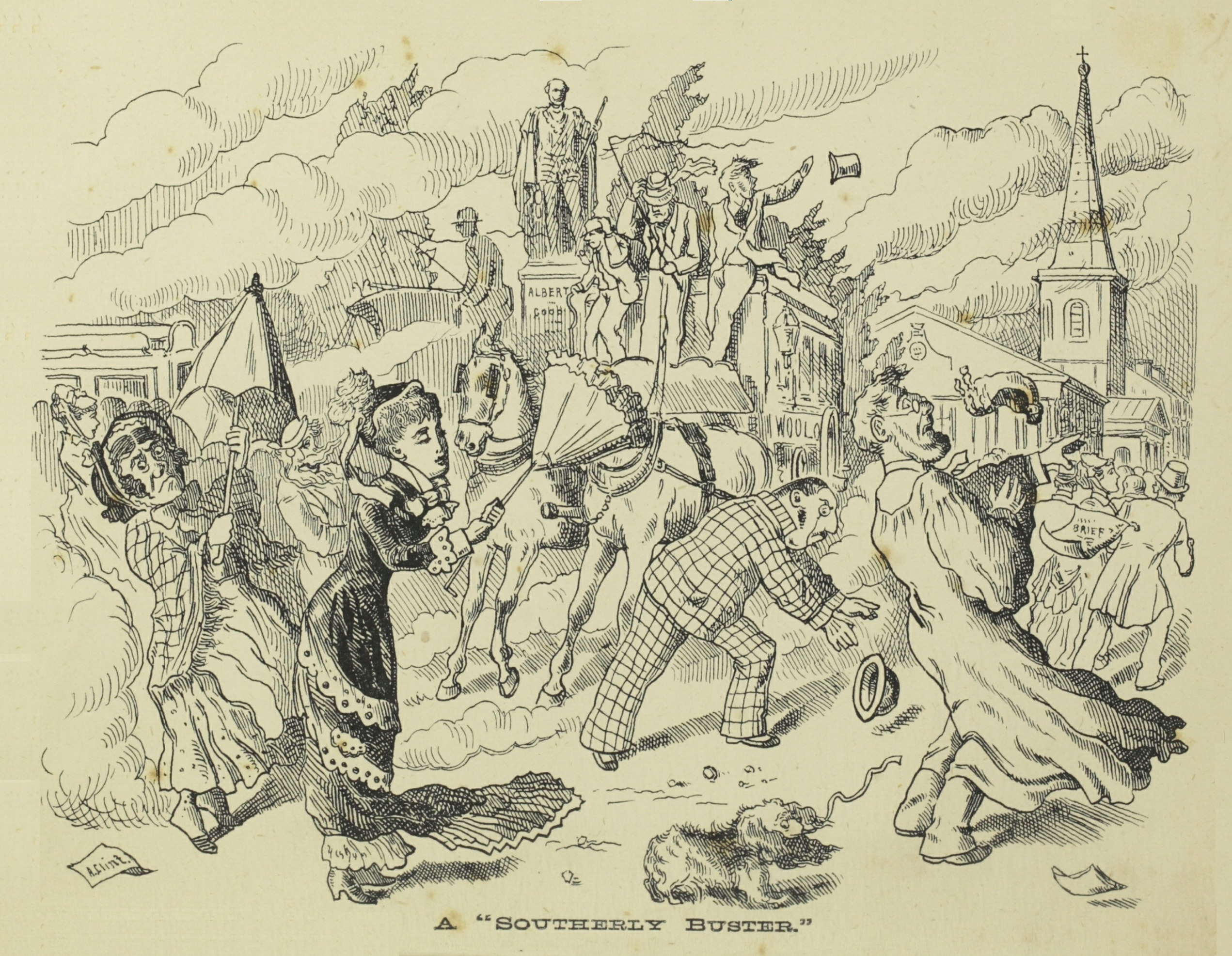
'A Southerly Buster', an illustration from Southerly Busters by 'Ironbark' (G. Herbert Gibson) published in 1878.

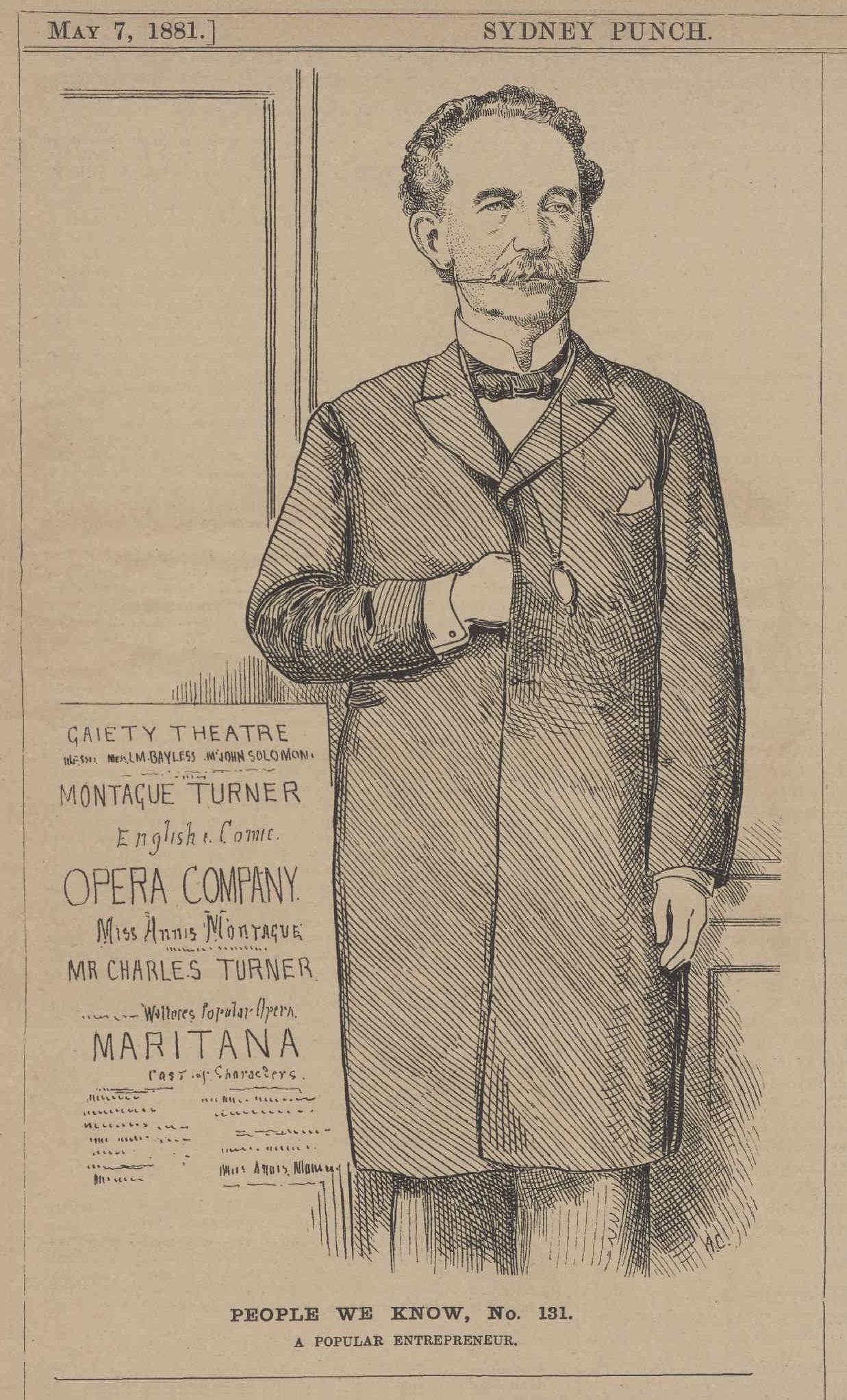
'People We Know – No. 131: A Popular Entrepreneur', published in Sydney Punch, 7 May 1881.

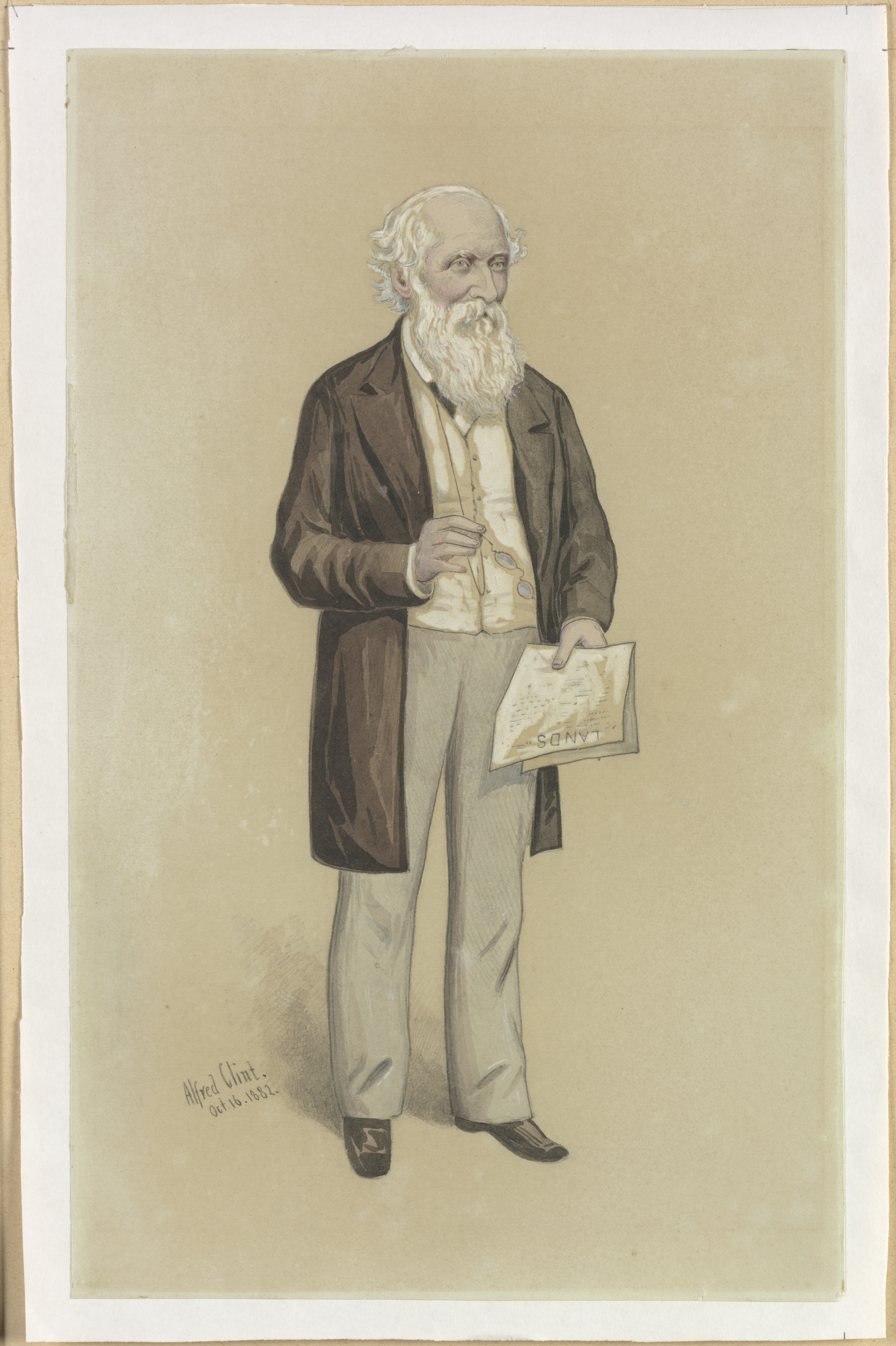
Portrait of Sir John Robertson (1882).

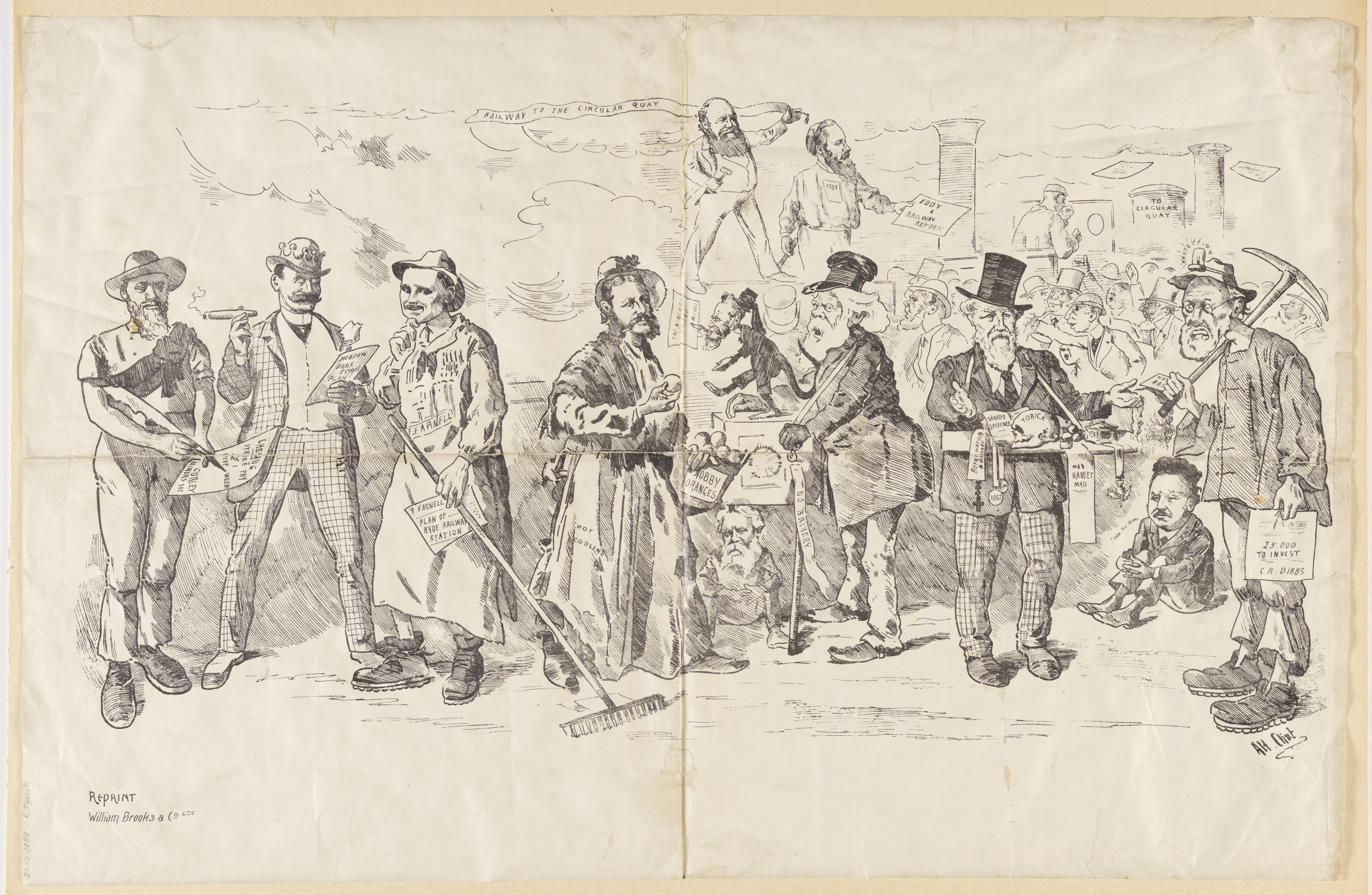
'Railway to the Circular Quay'.

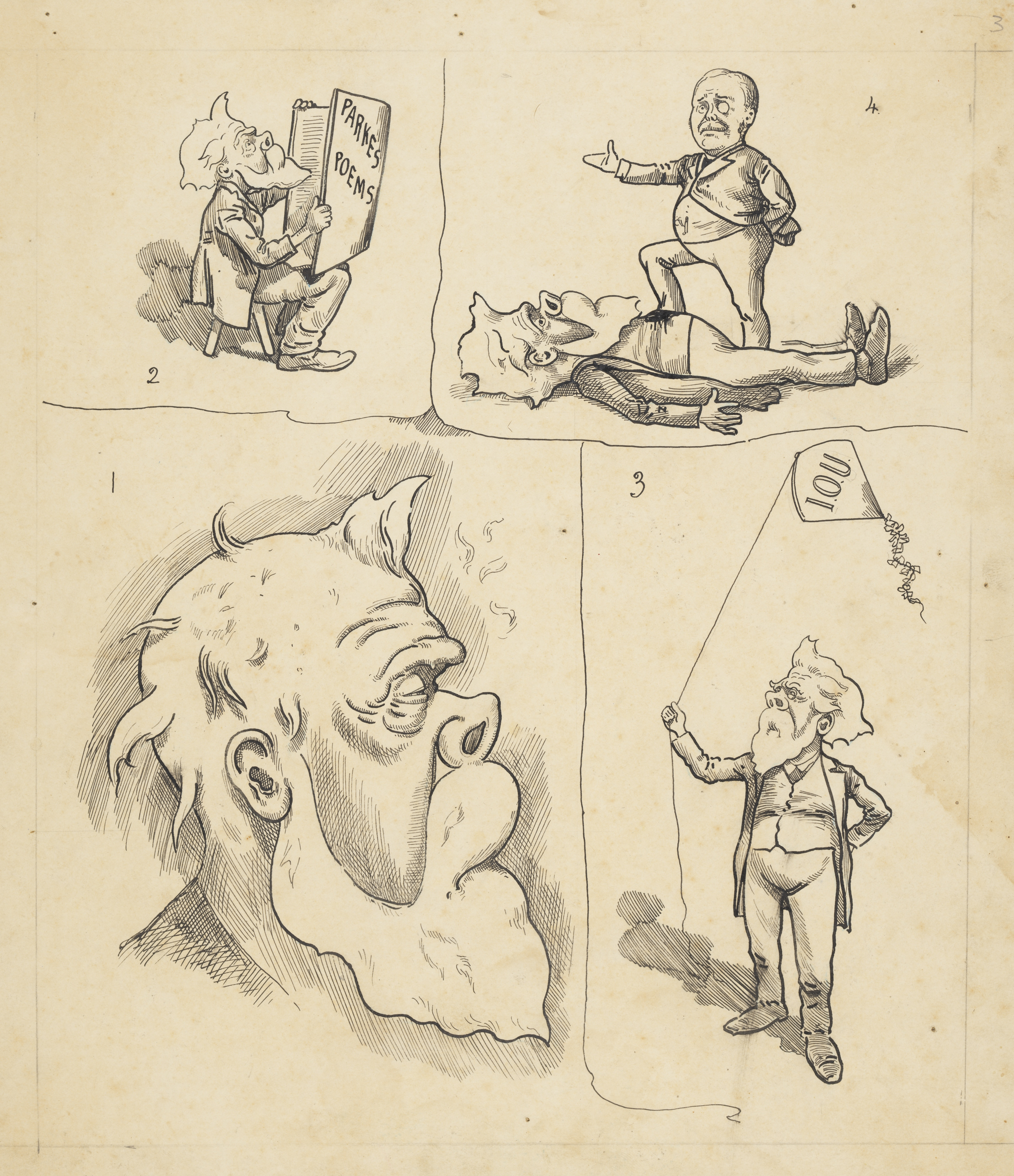
Cartoon drawings of Henry Parkes (about 1891).

== Notes ==
A.The pantomime The House That Jack Built had been previously staged during 1870 at the Theatre Royal in Melbourne, with "entirely new and amgnificent scenery painted by John Hennings and assistants".

B.Clint's Art Studios was carried on by the brothers Alfred and Sydney, but the business of theatrical scene-painting became increasingly non-viable with the growing popularity of movies and the economic depression of the 1930s.
