= Montague Scott =

Montagu Scott
- Born: Eugene Montagu Scott; 1835; London
- Died: 15 May 1909 (aged 73–74); Randwick, New South Wales
- Resting place: Waverley Cemetery; 33°54′26″S 151°15′51″E
- Education: Painter
- Known for: Painting, photography, illustration, cartoons
- Notable work: A day's picnic on Clark Island, Sydney Harbour, 1870, ML 3
- Spouse(s): Amy Ann Johnson (1839-1879), Annie Ware Wilton, Mary Ellen Price

Montague Scott (1835-1909), also known as "Montagu Scott", was a London born artist, photographer and cartoonist. He emigrated to Australia 1855 and was the official photographer for the Duke of Edinburgh's visit in 1868. He was cartoonist for the Sydney Punch from 1866 to 1886.

== Career ==
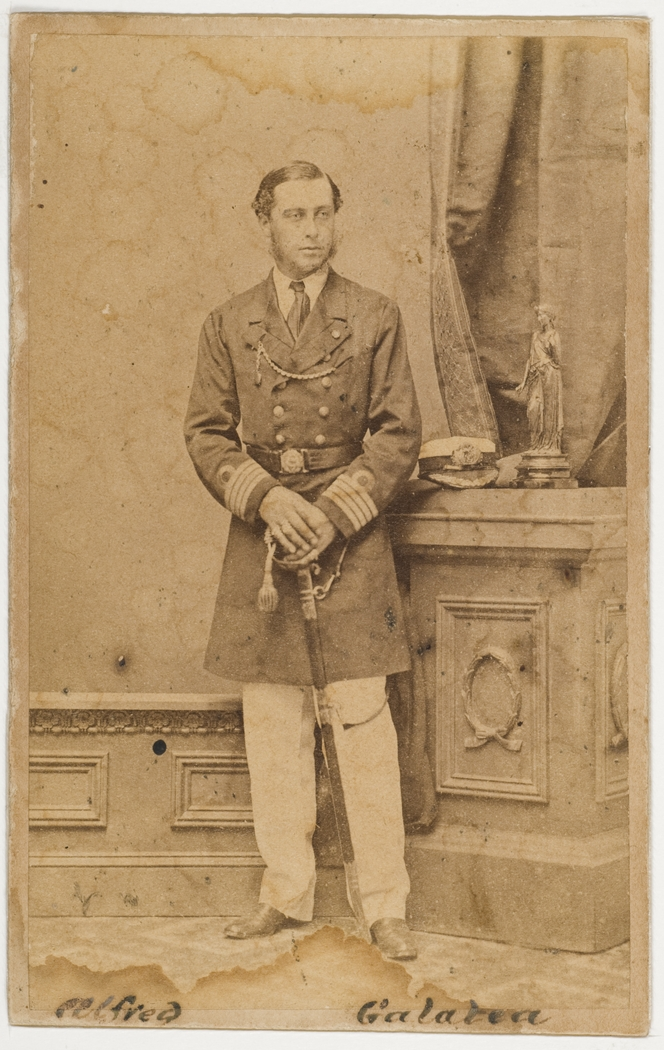
Duke of Edinburgh, Alfred Ernest Albert, Sydney, ca. 1868, by Montagu Scott

Scott was born Eugene Montagu Scott, the youngest son of William Scott R.A. and his wife Sarah née Myles in London and in the mid-1850s emigrated to Melbourne via New Zealand. He spent some time prospecting for gold but found it unrewarding.

While working for a photographic studio in Melbourne around 1860 he, like John A. Upton, was introduced by Dr. T. A. Hill to the art of photograph colouring. and studied painting under the "celebrated painter Ansdel", presumably Richard Ansdell.

He moved to Sydney in 1866, initially working for the photographer Thomas Felton, then around 1867 he took over Freeman Brothers' photographic studios at 392 George Street, naming it the "Sydney and Melbourne Photographic Gallery".

He was appointed official photographer for Prince Alfred, the Duke of Edinburgh's visit in 1868 and was commissioned by Henry Parkes to paint a full-size portrait of the Duke. Photographs of the Duke were offered for sale to the public by both Montagu Scott and William Bradley of 140 Pitt Street. But by 1870 he was bankrupt and forced to sell his equipment and the business was taken over by Newman and Co.

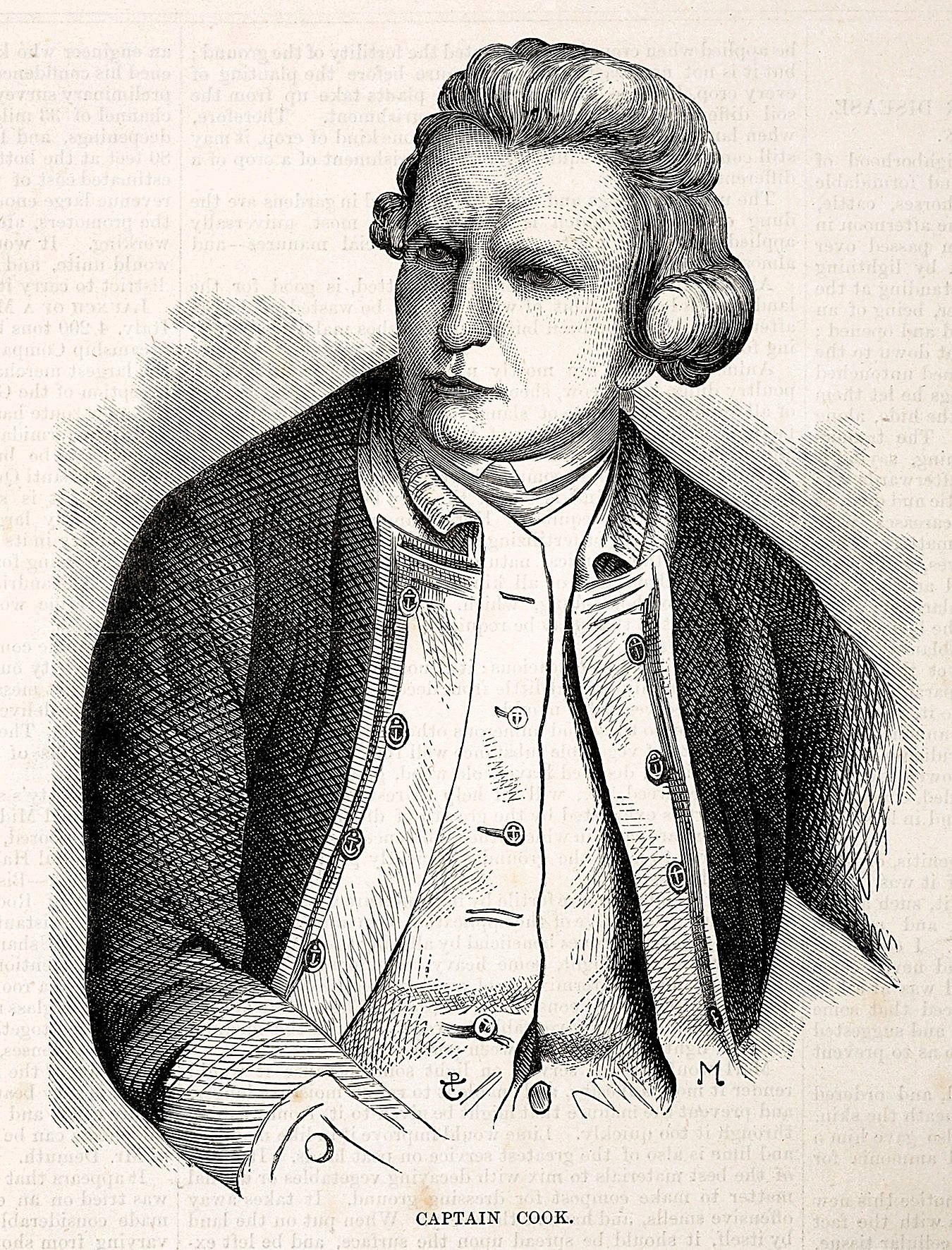
Montague Scott. Captain Cook. Illustrated Sydney News. ca. 1870

He produced some lithographs illustrating news items and in 1871 was the first artist to work for the Sydney Mail. Other lithographs included a souvenir of the return of the New South Wales Contingent to the Sudan, featuring portraits of W. B. Dalley, Colonel Richardson and Lieutenant Spalding.

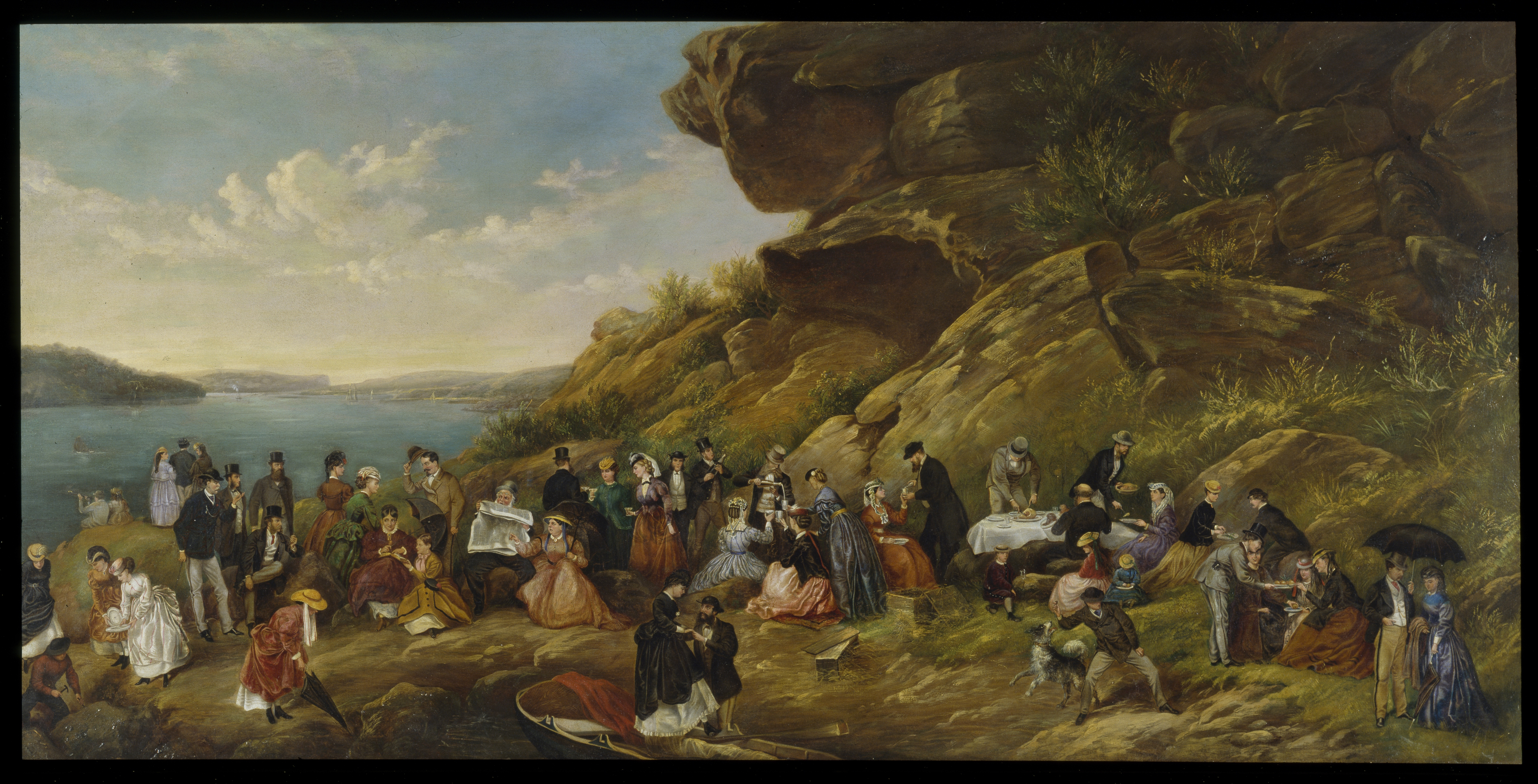
A days picnic on Clark Island Sydney Harbour 1870 Montagu Scott

In 1878 he was on stage in Sydney, drawing "lightning" caricatures of politicians including Sir Hercules Robinson and Sir Henry Parkes, then in both Melbourne and Sydney, illustrating passages from the Scriptures.

He was cartoonist for Melbourne Punch for two years, succeeding M. Chevallier, then for Sydney Punch from 1866 to 1886 or perhaps less. notably caricatures of Archbishop Polding and Sir Edward Deas-Thomson. and for the Australian Town and Country Journal. An example of his work may be seen here."Champions of the Willow"

Other paintings included The Death of Kennedy, A days picnic on Clark Island Sydney Harbour 1870 Montagu Scott (severely panned by one critic), and donated to the Mitchell Library in 1930, a grim Justice, and The Last Match.

He also produced dioramas, illustrated books and acted in dramatic productions.

He moved to Brisbane in 1887, working for the Brisbane Worker as an illustrator for its sports pages, and for the Brisbane Boomerang. He returned to Sydney around 1895. Work was becoming scarce as photographs displaced etchings in the newspapers and magazines and by 1908 he was again bankrupt.

== Portraits ==
Apart from Duke of Edinburgh (for which he charged 250 guineas), Scott also painted large oil portraits of:

- Richard Driver, M.L.A. in 1874
- Sydney merchant S. Hoffnung
- Archbishop Polding
- John Deery of the Tattersalls Club.
- S. H. Hyam M.L.C. in 1892

In later life his major commissions were for equine portraits.

== Family life ==
On 20 July 1857 he married Amy Ann Johnson (ca.1839 – 15 September 1879). They had three children:

- Isabel Amy (ca.1860 – 20 July 1916), later Mrs. George Buckleton, of Moe, Victoria
- William (18 February 1862 – )
- second daughter (18 July 1863 – ) Mrs. Passmore of Melbourne, later Mrs. Davis of Croxton, Victoria.

He married again, to Annie Ware Wilton on 28 October 1880.

On 5 December 1889 he remarried, this time to Mary Ellen Price, née Mehan.

He died, bankrupt and stone deaf, at his home at Randwick, New South Wales on Saturday 15 May 1909.

== Bibliography ==
Gibson, G. Herbert (1846–1921) Southerly busters by Ironbark, profusely illustrated by Alfred Clint, with additional illustrations by Montagu Scott. John Sands, Sydney 1878
