= Clinton Hill =

Clinton Hill or Clint Hill may refer to:

== Places in the United States ==
- Clinton Hill, Brooklyn, New York, a neighborhood
  - Clinton Hill Historic District
- Clinton Hill, Newark, New Jersey, a neighborhood

== People ==
- Clinton Hill (artist) (1922–2003), American abstract artist
- Clint Hill (Secret Service) (1932–2025), United States Secret Service agent
- Clint Hill (footballer) (born 1978), English footballer
- Clinton Hill (athlete) (born 1980), Australian sprinter
- Clint Hill (rugby league) (born 1981), Australian rugby league footballer
