= Werriwa Times and Goulburn District News =

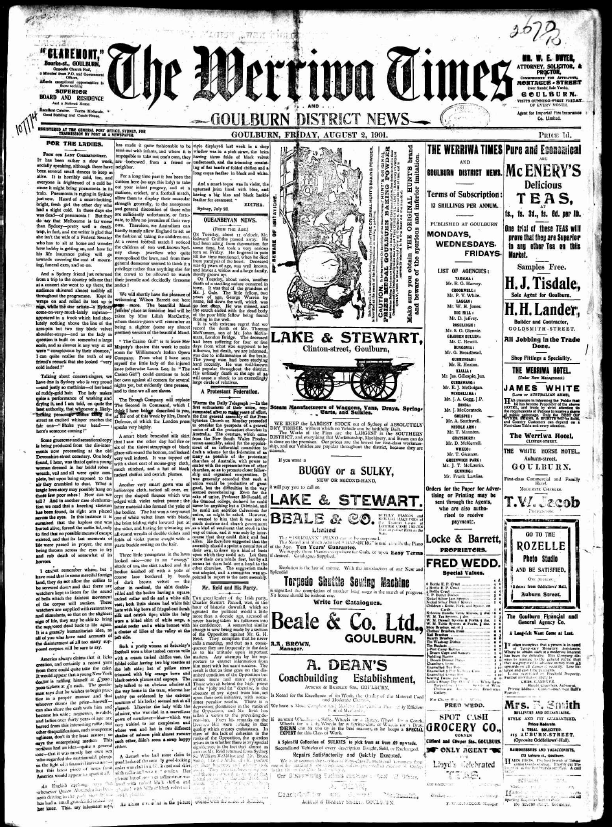
The front page of the Werriwa Times and Goulburn District News on 2 August 1901

The Werriwa Times and Goulburn District News was a short-lived, English language newspaper published three times per week in Goulburn, New South Wales, Australia.

== History ==
First published on 2 August 1901, the Werriwa Times ceased publication on 23 December 1901. It operated on a platform of protectionism, and drew editorial expertise from a team of respected publishers, political activists and journalists. Several prominent landowners were amongst its provisional Board of Directors, including AB Chisholm of "Carrawarra", George Broadhead of "Inverary Park", Bungonia and Patrick Heffernan of Gurrundah. The proprietors were Arthur Connor Barrett and James Locke. Barrett, a tailor by trade, was a Goulburn city alderman and subsequently mayor of the city in 1902. He went on to stand for the Federal constituency of the Division of Werriwa at the polls of 1903. Locke had seen activity in a range of earlier Goulburn district newspapers, including the Goulburn Argus and Advocate for the Southern Districts of New South Wales and the Goulburn Evening Star.

Editor of The Werriwa Times was George Burnett Barton, lawyer and journalist, who was recognised as a "careful editor and a good working journalist especially when promoting or attacking a cause". He was the elder brother of Sir Edmund Barton, Australia's first Prime Minister. Journalist with The Werriwa Times was John Walsh. Walsh had previously been with The Goulburn Herald, and in partnership with Locke on The Goulburn Argus which was later to become The Southern Daily Argus, Goulburn's first daily newspaper.

Several events contributed to the closure of The Werriwa Times including financial difficulties, competition for advertising and circulation revenue, and the death of George Barton on 12 September 1901 from bronchial pneumonia. Goulburn already had two well established tri-weeklies: the Goulburn Herald (established 1848) and the Goulburn Evening Penny Post, (est. 1870). Efforts to float the paper as a limited liability company were unsuccessful. A general meeting of the paper's supporters was called for 28 December 1901, to discuss "arrangements pending in connection with the management". No further issues were published.

== Digitisation ==
Sixty one issues of The Werriwa Times remain in existence. These have been digitised as part of the Australian Newspapers Digitisation Program project hosted by the National Library of Australia.

== See also ==
- List of newspapers in Australia
- List of newspapers in New South Wales
