= George Burnett Barton =

Australian journalist and historian

George Burnett Barton (9 December 1836 – 12 September 1901) was an Australian lawyer, journalist and historian.

== Early life and education ==
Barton was born in Sydney, the second son of William Barton and Mary Louise Barton, and elder brother of Sir Edmund Barton. He was educated at William Timothy Cape's school and at the University of Sydney.

After a dispute with Professor John Woolley, he left for England, where he was admitted to the Middle Temple on 20 April 1857 and called to the Bar in 1860.

== Career ==
Barton returned to Australia and became a journalist. In 1864 he became the editor of, and a contributor to, the Sydney Punch.

His career made him, according to H.M. Green, "the founder of Australian literary criticism."

Barton went to New Zealand in 1868, and for about three years (1868–1871) was editor of the Otago Daily Times. Barton was known as "long Barton" in New Zealand to distinguish him from "little Barton" or George Elliott Barton (unrelated) who was also a lawyer and (briefly) a Wellington MP.

=== Legal career ===
He also edited the New Zealand Jurist.

=== Journalism career ===
He returned to Australia in the 1880s. He wrote the first volume of History of New South Wales From the Records, which was to have run into thirteen volumes but after a dispute over payment, Barton resigned. His book The True Story of Margaret Catchpole was published posthumously in 1924. He later moved to Goulburn, where he was the editor of the short-lived protectionist newspaper The Werriwa Times and Goulburn District News in 1901. He died in Goulburn Hospital on 12 September 1901 of influenza.
