= Edgar Ray =

English newspaper proprietor

Edgar Ray (24 April 1828 – 23 August 1905) was an English entrepreneur who launched two magazines in Australia, Melbourne Punch and Sydney Punch. On his return to England, he is credited with founding another, named Touchstone or The New Era.

== History ==
Ray was born in Bristol, England, a son of Edward Adam Ray (1766–1853) and Eliza Ray, née Weller (c. 1793–1884). His father was a merchant who turned theatre manager. A sister, Matilda Ray (c. 1790–1842), was a successful actor, married to the musician and composer Charles Edward Horn. Ray and his half-brother (Note: A convenient term, but their actual relationship is unknown and perhaps unknowable.) William C. Lyon received some musical instruction from William Hawes, with whom they boarded in London.

Ray sailed to Australia by the Lady Eveline, arriving in Melbourne in October 1852 in company with three or four singers making up a choir, the "City of London Glee and Madrigal Union" who staged a concert at the "Mechanics' Institution" on 4 December 1852. The same musicians gave a "Grand Concert of Sacred Music" at the Mechanics' Institution (or Institute, later Athenaeum, Collins Street) on 18 January 1853. This may have been Ray's last public performance as a chorister. His half-brother William Charles Lyon died 18 July 1853.

He established a print shop, operated by Harvey Roulston (founder in 1858 of The Richmond Australian), William Fenton, and one Green, and founded the daily newspaper The Auction Mart Advertiser and in August 1855 the weekly Melbourne Punch, with Frederick Sinnett as editor and chief writer. Around 1860 Ray sold his business and interest in Melbourne Punch to Capt. Henry Butler Stoney (1816–1894), author of A Residence in Tasmania and Victoria during the Ballarat Riots in 1854.

In 1863 he employed a team of artists to produce a great diorama Christmas in Old England which he exhibited in Melbourne late that year. Contributors included G. A. Appleton (brother of F. C Appleton), Nicholas Chevalier, H. Freyberger, E. J. Greig (first cartoonist for Sydney Punch, drowned 1864), John Hennings, and J. Willis.

He moved to Sydney and in May 1864 issued a prospectus, announcing the establishment of Sydney Punch on the 27th, and soliciting investors. Ray divested himself of his interest in the paper around 1866 or 1867.

In September 1867 he took over the lease of the Prince of Wales Theatre, from David Crabb, who declared insolvency. He "poached" J. E. Hall as stage manager from the Victoria Theatre, introduced Alice and Laura Wiseman (sisters of Mrs Hall, née Emily Wiseman) to the Sydney stage, and recruited A. C. Habbe as scenic designer; opening on 14 September with the drama Our Village. The expected crowds failed to arrive; in October he applied for a certificate of insolvency and by 15 November George Coppin had taken over as lessee and J. R. Greville as stage manager.

After several positions in insurance and banking Ray left for England by the Nubia on 7 October 1875.

In 1877 he started a London newspaper called Touchstone or The New Era. This annoyed Edward Ledger, editor and proprietor of The Era, "The Actor's Bible", which had a columnist calling himself "Touchstone". After a legal dispute, Ray was cleared of any wrongdoing. In the issue of 9 November 1879, Ray published a biography of Henry Labouchère, the editor of London Truth, with the promise of a similar article on Edmund Yates, editor of The World, prompting a threat of physical violence from that gentleman. The founding of this short-lived periodical has been attributed to F. B. Chatterton, with George Augustus Sala a significant contributor.

He died in Kew, England, on 23 August 1905.

== Personal ==
Ray married Charlotte Goodriff Pitman (c. 1832–1907) in Melbourne on 15 November 1853. They had three children:

- Edgar Ray (born 9 August 1855)
- Edith Henrietta Ray (born 24 August 1857)
- Alice Frederica Ray (born 1 June 1860)
