= Clint =

Clint may refer to:

- Clint (name), a given name and a surname

== Places ==
- Clint, North Yorkshire, a village in England
- Clint, Texas, a town in the United States

== Fictional characters ==
- Clint Barton, a superhero in American comic books published by Marvel Comics
- Clint, a playable character in the mobile game Mobile Legends: Bang Bang

== Other uses ==
- CLiNT, a UK comic edited by Mark Millar
- Clint, a feature of Limestone pavements
- Clint (film), a 2017 Malayalam-language Indian biographical film
