= Henry Neville Montagu =

Journalist and newspaper proprietor

Henry Neville Montagu M.A. (Oxon), Ph.D. (c. 1823 – 14 March 1901) was a journalist and newspaper proprietor in Australia.

== History ==
Montagu arrived in Sydney around 1860 and was English master at several girls' schools including Carlton House, Wynyard Square, until 1868, when he and Mrs Montagu founded the Queen's College for Girls, at 143 Darlinghurst Road, Darlinghurst, which they ran from 1868 to 1875.

He purchased the struggling Sydney Punch around 1873 and as editor turned its fortunes around. He was subsequently sued for libel by a firm of solicitors by claiming they had pocketed virtually all of a defendant's award when in fact it was only most of it.

He served as manager of the Majeroni Theatrical Company for their season in Brisbane, September 1876, and shortly after sold Punch to C. A. W. Lett for a substantial profit.

He was manager for other entertainments.

== Other interests ==
He was a manager of Sydney's Orpheonist Society 1861–1866 and its secretary for much of that time.

He was a drama critic for The Morning Post of London, and music and drama critic for several Sydney papers, including Empire and Town and Country Journal.

In 1881 he was elected foundation president of the Sydney Press Club.

He was a distinguished Freeason, and was made PGSD (Past Grand Senior Deacon), England, a high distinction, for his services.

== Family ==
He married Theodora Maximilliana Zincken and had a large family; Neville W. Montagu, the Sydney solicitor (died 1945) and noted lawn bowler, was his eldest son. He married again in 1894, to Ada Carolyn Glover, widow of Dr G. R. R. Lloyd.

He died at his home, 'Llanabar", 77 Bridge Road, Camperdown, and his remains were buried in Rookwood Cemetery.
