= Sydney Punch =

Australian satirical magazine (1864–1888)

- Editor: George Burnett Barton (1864)
- Frequency: Weekly
- Format: quarto
- Publisher: Edgar Ray
- First issue: May 27, 1864; 162 years ago
- Final issue: May 5, 1888; 138 years ago

Sydney Punch (1864–1888) was a humorous and satirical magazine published in Sydney, New South Wales. Like Melbourne Punch and Adelaide Punch, it was modelled on Punch of London.

== History ==
First published in May 1864, it was the third magazine of the name to be published, the previous two having failed after a few issues. It was founded by Edgar Ray, (1828–1905), co-founder with Frederick Sinnett of Melbourne Punch.

Each issue might include satirical articles on contemporary social and political topics, short humorous essays, parliamentary reports, theatrical notes, comic poetry, jokes, satirical political biographies, illustrations and cartoons.

Editors include G. B. Barton (1864), George Ross Morton (1865-69), Henry Montagu (1875), Harold Stephen and William Hicks (1878-1881) who was also a joint owner.

Writers who contributed to the publication include William Dalley, William Forster, R. P. Whitworth, Garnet Walch, Richard Rowe, Victor Daley, Charles Harpur, Henry Kendall, George Barton, Daniel Deniehy, George Mortin and Grosvenor Bunster.

Among the artists who provided illustrations and cartoons were Alfred Clint and William Macleod.

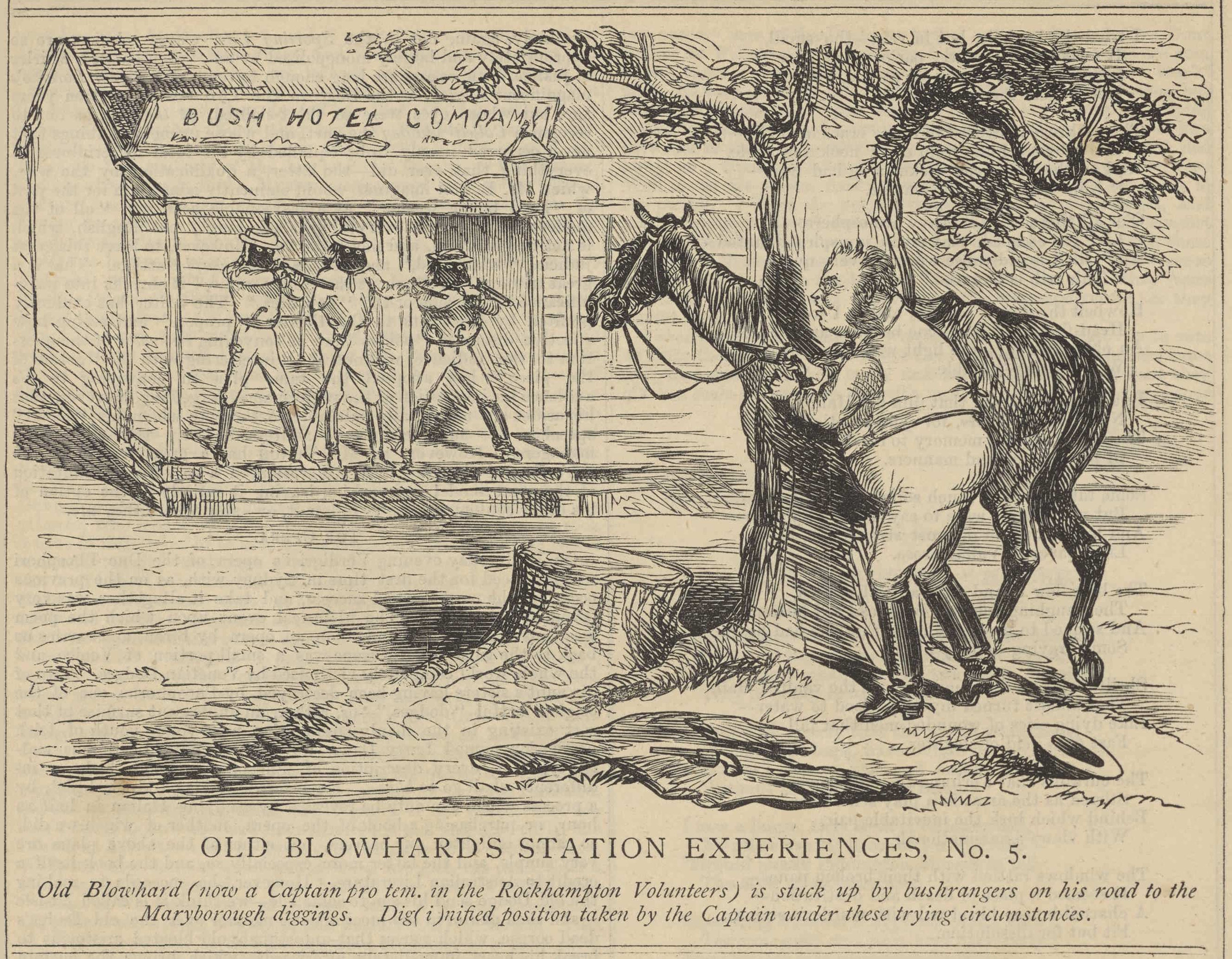
Old Blowhard’s station experience, No.5. Sydney Punch, 30 May 1868.

It was quarto in size, initially contained 8 pages and cost 4 pence. This had increased to 6 pence by 1866.

By 1868, it was available from Gordon & Gotch, newsagent, Strand, London. Gordon & Gotch were the owners of the periodical for a time.
