= Clint Hill (rugby league) =

Australian rugby league footballer

Personal information
- Born: 26 April 1981 (age 43)

Playing information
Club
| Years | Team | Pld | T | G | FG | P |
|---|---|---|---|---|---|---|
| 2003 | Wests Tigers | 1 | 0 | 0 | 0 | 0 |

Clint Hill (born 26 April 1981) is an Australian former professional athlete rugby league footballer who played for the Wests Tigers.
