= Scipio Clint =

Scipio Clint (1805–1839) was an English medallist and seal-engraver.

== Life ==
He was the son of George Clint, A.R.A., the portrait-painter and engraver. He gained a medal at the Society of Arts in 1824. He exhibited at the Royal Academy for the first time in 1825, and in 1830 exhibited there his dies for a medal of Sir Thomas Lawrence. He was appointed medallist to William IV and seal-engraver to Queen Victoria, and was beginning to attain some distinction in his profession when he died on 6 August 1839, aged 34.

== Works ==
Among Clint's medals, which are not numerous, are:

- two of Sir Thomas Lawrence, with heads after the models of Edward Hodges Baily and Samuel Joseph;
- a medal of Cardinal Wiseman, dated 1836, with reverse, sacred emblems (a specimen, presented by Clint, is in the British Museum); and
- one of the prize medals for Winchester College, having obverse, head of William IV, and reverse, tomb of William of Wykeham.

His medals are signed Clint or S. Clint.
