= Alfred Clint =

British painter (1807–1883)

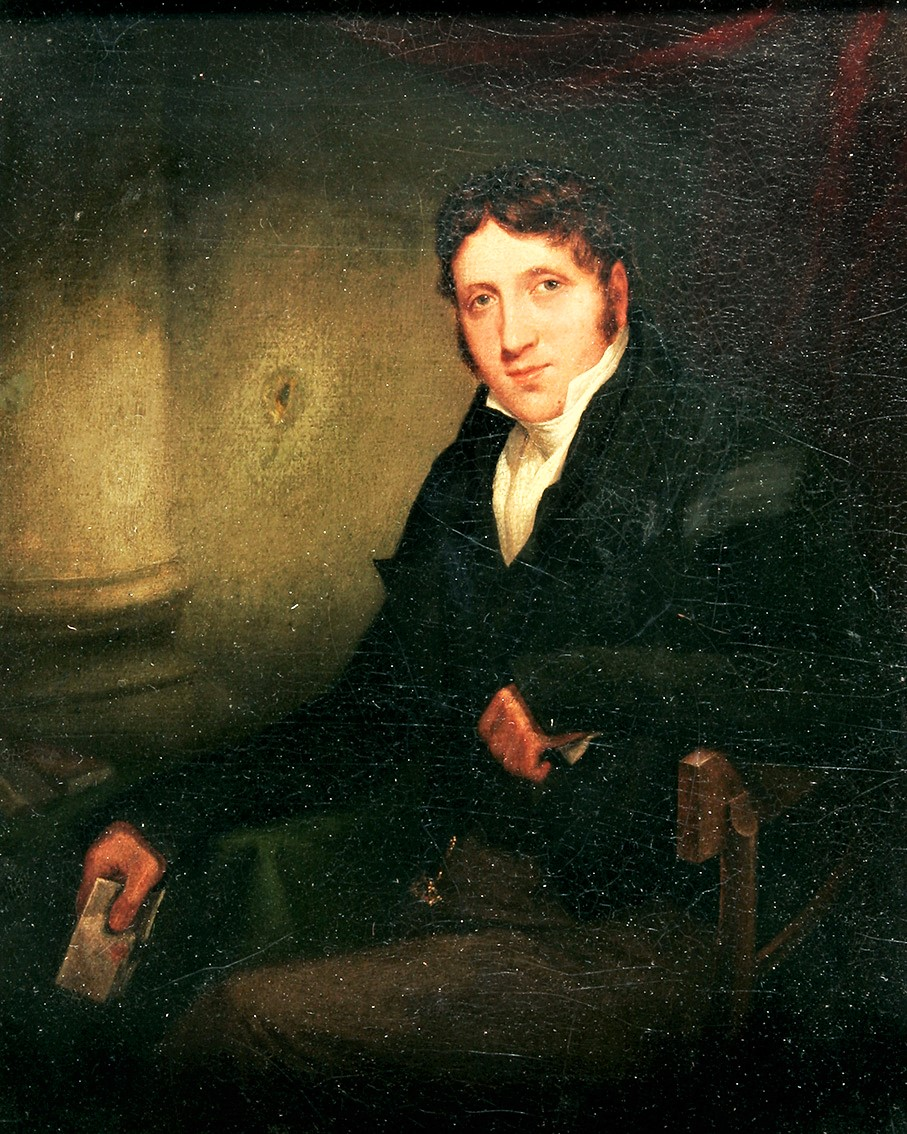
Portrait of John Sell Cotman by Alfred Clint

Alfred Clint RBA (22 March 1807 – 22 March 1883) was an English marine painter.

== Life ==
Clint was the fifth and youngest son by the first marriage of George Clint, A.R.A. He was born in Alfred Place, Bedford Square, London, on 22 March 1807.

He acquired the technical knowledge of painting from his father, while he studied from the life at a students' society, which met first in Drury Lane and afterwards in the Savoy. In early life he painted portraits and landscapes. He exhibited for the first time in 1828 at the British Institution, sending in the folio wins year a 'Study from Nature' to the Royal Academy. In 1831 he began to exhibit at the Society of British Artists. He became a member of the society in 1843 and secretary from 1853 to 1859. He succeeded Frederick Yeates Hurlstone as president in 1869 and continued to fill that office until 1881.

He is best known as a marine painter, the subjects of his pictures taken chiefly from the English Channel, and especially from Jersey, Guernsey, and the coast of Sussex. They were very popular, and some of them have been engraved. Between 1828 and 1879 he contributed 402 works to the exhibitions of the Royal Academy, British Institution, and the Society of British Artists. He drew and etched the illustrations to George John Bennett's Pedestrian's Guide through North Wales, 1838, and in 1856 wrote Landscape from Nature, the second part of John Samuelson Templeton's Guide to Oil Painting.

Clint died in Lancaster Road, Notting Hill, London, on his birthday, 22 March 1883, at the age of 76, after having for about five years relinquished the pursuit of art owing to failing eyesight. He was buried in the same grave as his father, in Kensal Green cemetery. His remaining works were sold by Messrs. Christie, Manson, & Woods in February 1884.
