= George Clint =

English painter and engraver (1770–1854)

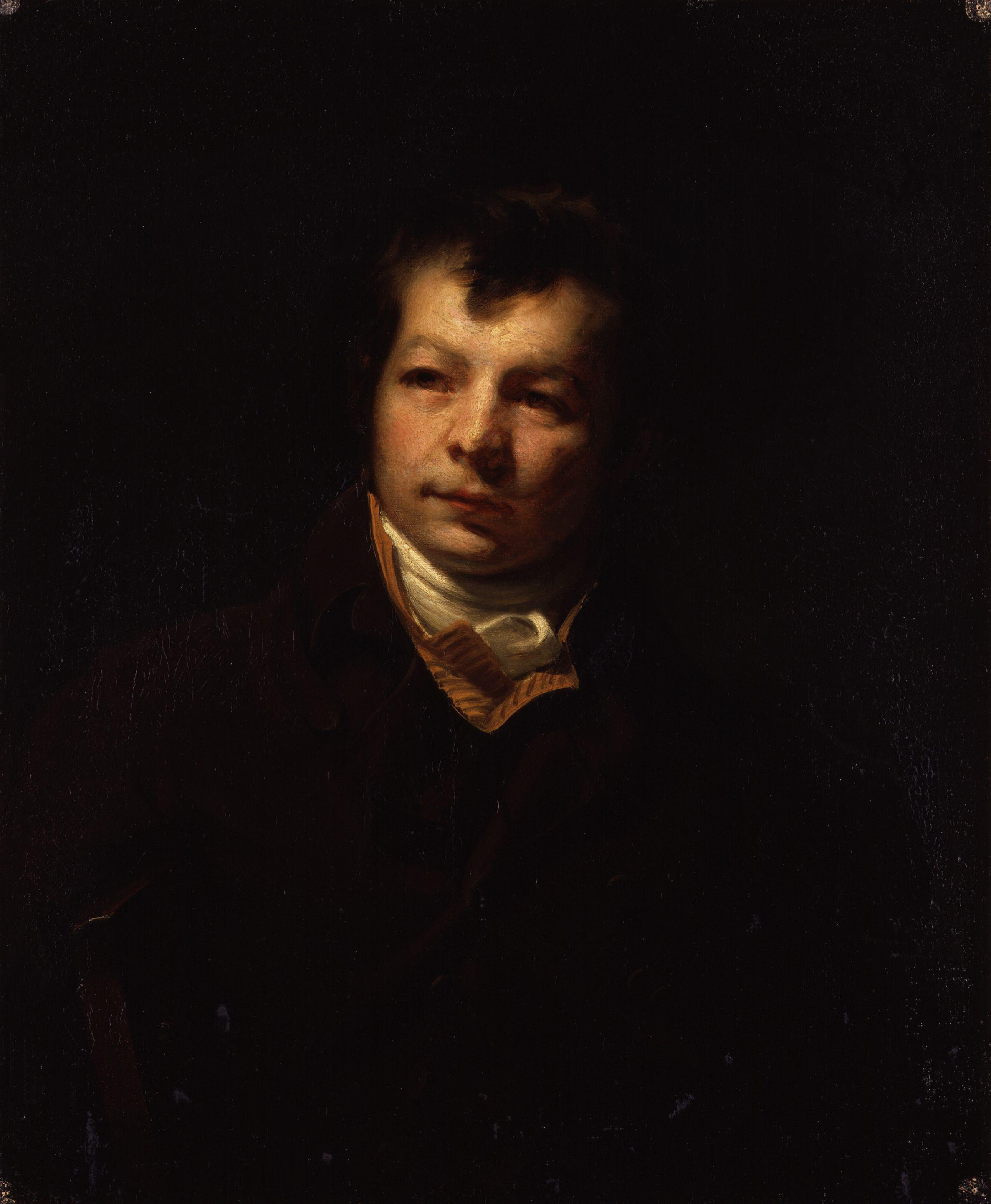
- Self-portrait, c. 1800
- Born: 12 April 1770; Covent Garden, London
- Died: 10 May 1854 (aged 84); Kensington, London
- Occupations: Painter, engraver
- Children: Scipio Clint, Raphael Clint, Alfred Clint

George Clint ARA (12 April 1770 – 10 May 1854) was an English painter and engraver who specialised in portrait painting.

== Life ==
Clint was born in Brownlow Street, Drury Lane, Covent Garden, London, the son of Michael Clint, a hairdresser in Lombard Street. He went to school in Yorkshire and was then apprenticed to a fishmonger, but left after a violent dispute with his employer. He found alternative employment in an attorney's office, but took exception to the work and became a house-painter instead - one of his jobs was painting the stones of the arches in the nave of Westminster Abbey. He also decorated the exterior of a house built by Sir Christopher Wren in Cheapside, and was later employed by the bookseller Thomas Tegg.

He married the daughter of a small farmer in Berkshire; they had five sons and four daughters. His wife died a fortnight after giving birth to their son Alfred, who also became an artist.

Clint took up miniature painting. He had a studio in Leadenhall Street, and he became acquainted with the publisher John Bell, whose nephew, the mezzotint engraver Edward Bell, taught Clint the art of engraving. His first in oil painting was a portrait of his wife. At this period Samuel Reynolds, the engraver, advised him to undertake watercolour portraits. Commissions proving scarce, he made copies, in colour, from prints after George Morland and Teniers; he reproduced Morland's The Enraged Bull and The Horse struck by Lightning several times.

Around 1816, his studio at 83 Gower Street, was a meeting place of the leading actors and actresses of the day. This popularity arose from a series of dramatic scenes which he painted, such as "William Farren, Farley, and Jones as Lord Ogleby, Canton, and Brush" in the comedy The Clandestine Marriage.

Clint was elected an associate of the Royal Academy in 1821, a position he resigned in 1836, after repeated disappointments in not being made a full academician. He subsequently took a house in Peckham, but moved to Pembroke Square, where he died on 10 May 1864.

== Works ==
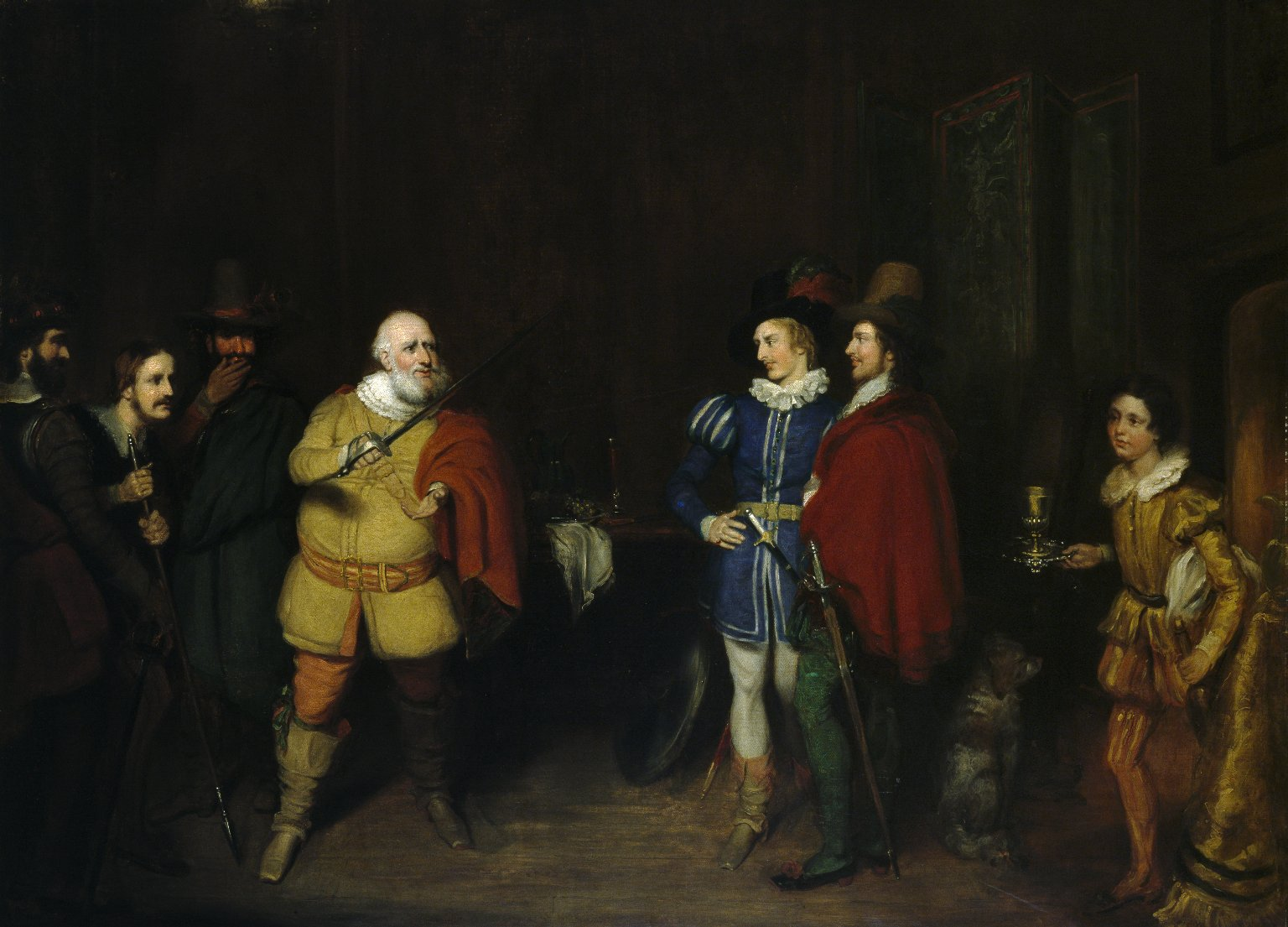
Falstaff relating his valiant exploits, c. mid–1830s

He painted portraits of Lord Suffield and his family, George Wyndham, 3rd Earl of Egremont, George Capel-Coningsby, 5th Earl of Essex, Lord Spencer, General Henry Wyndham, and many others. He executed several theatrical portraits for Mrs. Griffiths of Norwood, some of which were destroyed by fire. His Falstaff and Mistress Ford are in the Tate Gallery.

His early engravings include The Frightened Horse, after George Stubbs; The Entombment, after Dietrich; The Death of Nelson, after Samuel Drummond, and a set of the Raphael Cartoons in outline. His mezzotints included The Trial of Queen Caroline, after George Henry Harlow; a portrait of William Pitt the Younger, after John Hoppner; a portrait of Margaret, Lady Dundas, after Thomas Lawrence; a portrait of Sarah Siddons, again after Lawrence, and a print after a self-portrait by Sir Joshua Reynolds. There are also portraits of the engraver George Cook; the publisher John Bell; the actors Edmund Kean, Charles Young (as Hamlet), William Dowton and John Liston (the latter as Paul Pry) and the actresses Lucia Elizabeth Vestris and Julia Glover.

== Family ==
One of Clint's sons, Scipio Clint, was a notable medallist and seal engraver. Of his other sons Raphael Clint (1797–1849) was an engraver and Alfred Clint (1807–1833) a marine painter.
