= Royal Hobart Regatta =

Event in Hobart, Tasmania, Australia

Coordinates: 42.876158°S 147.338089°E

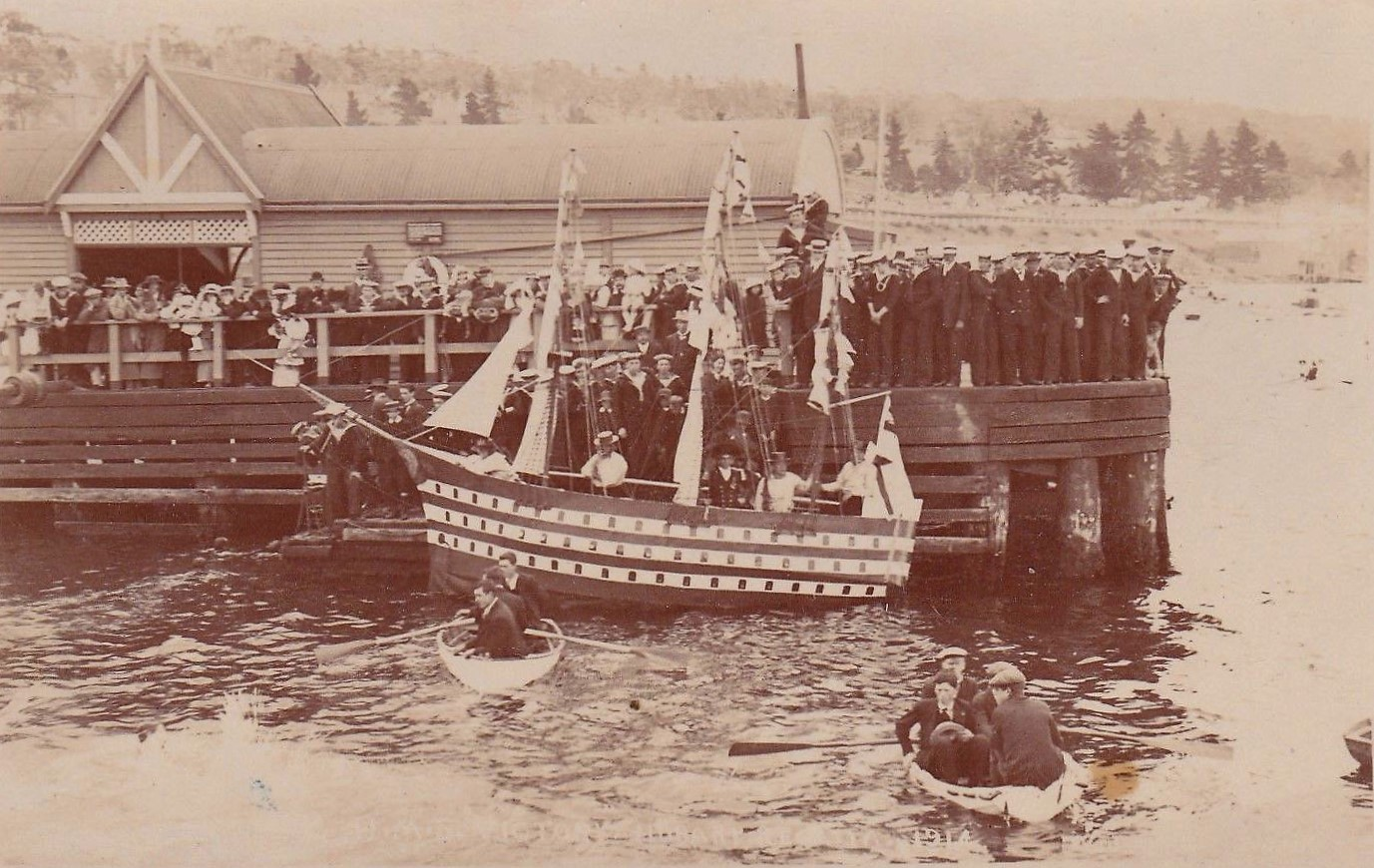
- Royal Hobart Regatta in 1914
- Also called: The Regatta
- Observed by: Southern Tasmania
- Type: Southern public holiday
- Significance: Australia's largest aquatic event
- Celebrations: Sea farers
- Date: Three days, ending on the second Monday in February
- Duration: 3 days
- Frequency: Annual
- First time: 1 December 1838
- Started by: Governor of Tasmania - Sir John Franklin

The Royal Hobart Regatta is a series of aquatic competitions and displays held annually in Hobart, Tasmania, Australia and is Tasmania's oldest sporting event. The regatta began in 1838.

The event runs for three days and incorporates a public holiday observed in Southern Tasmania on the second Monday in February.

It is regularly well attended by the public in addition to local and interstate competitors.

In its beginning the Regatta was well supported by the Royal Navy. In recent years the Royal Australian Navy, sends a warship to serve as flagship for the three day spectacle. The Royal Australian Air Force, also regularly performs aerobatic displays using military aircraft such as the RAAF Roulettes. The Australian Army's elite Red Beret parachute regiment has previously provided sky diving displays.

== Royal Hobart Regatta Association ==
Governance of the Royal Hobart Regatta is executed by an association of the same name, The Royal Hobart Regatta Association.

The Association is controlled by a board, executive and committee. The current president is Ross Doddridge.

== History ==
On 1 December 1838, the first Hobart Town Anniversary Regatta was held in Hobart to celebrate the anniversary of the 17th-century European discovery of Tasmania by Dutch explorer Abel Tasman, who made the first reported European sighting of the island on 24 November 1642.

It was decided that an annual anniversary regatta should be held and include the wearing of a sprig of silver wattle blossom tied with British navy blue ribbon, a tradition instituted by Governor of Tasmania, Sir John Franklin.

Franklin provided free food and beer for all of the spectators, and the tradition of free entry continues to this day. The Monday was declared a public holiday by the Governor and is now the oldest public holiday still continuing in Australia.

Since 1879 the regatta has been held in January or February, rather than December. The regatta of 6 February 1934 was the first to be called the Royal Hobart Regatta, the title being conferred by King George V.

=== Cancelled events ===
- 1853
- 1854
- 1967 - Cancelled due to "Black Tuesday" bushfire on 7 February

The Regatta continued throughout World War I and World War II.

=== Significant milestones ===
- 5 December 1942 - commemorated the 300th anniversary of Abel Tasman's exploration
- 11 February 1955 - 80,000 people attend the Regatta in a single day, a number that represents 90% of the Hobart population
- 2013 - 175th Regatta
- 11 February 2023 - commemorated the 185th anniversary of the event

== Royal visits ==
The Royal Hobart Regatta has played host to ten royal visits, the most notable being a visit from Queen Elizabeth II and Prince Philip in 1963 when they arrived aboard HMY Britannia. In preparation for the occasion the main grandstand was extended and accommodated the royals, who stayed for lunch before departing for Sydney in the late afternoon.

== Location ==
Originally staged at Pavilion Point, the Regatta moved in 1856, to grounds near Macquarie Point known as the "Regatta Grounds" at the Queens Domain along the western side of the River Derwent. Records indicate the move was necessitated following a quarrel with Government House concerning broken beer bottles along Macquarie.

Access to the site is along McVilly Drive.

The grounds are shared with the Hobart Cenotaph, a war memorial to Tasmanian's fallen from global conflict. The primary Regatta structure on the site is the John Colville Memorial grandstand, which pays tribute to members of the aquatic fraternity that fell in World War I.

== Events ==
A plethora of events take place each year, and include:

- Jet ski and power boat races
- Dragon boat racing
- Tug of war
- Open water swimming
- Sailing
- Rowing
- Woodchopping

There is also an Ambassador quest, and the regatta always has an official attendance ceremony by the Governor.

=== Trans Derwent Swim ===
Commencing adjacent Montagu Bay the Trans Derwent Swim sees competitors cross the River Derwent Estuary, a distance of 1.5km. In recent years a return trip has been added as an extra race.

=== Two Bridge Kayak Race ===
This paddling event sees kayakers travel from the Tasman Bridge to the Bowen Bridge before returning to the finish line at the Royal Hobart Regatta grounds. A total distance of 15km is covered.

=== Wood chopping ===
Woodchopping sees axemen from across the state compete in various events and age divisions chopping and sawing blocks and wood.

== Flagships ==
A flagship is a vessel used by the commanding officer of a group of naval ships and/ or the finest, largest, or most important one of a group of things.

Year	Regatta	Ship	Class	Type	Registration
2026	188	HMAS Stalwart (III)	Supply Class		A 304
2025	187	STS Young Endavour		Sail Training Ship	
2024	186	HMAS Diamantina (II)	Huon Class	Mine Hunter	M 86
2023	185	HMAS Arunta (II)	ANZAC Frigate	Destroyer	FFH-151
2022	184	HMAS Hobart	Hobart Class	Destroyer, Guided Missile	DDG-39
2021	183	HMAS Hobart	Hobart Class	Destroyer, Guided Missile	DDG-39
2020	182	HMAS Sirius		Fleet Replenishment Vessel	O 266
2019	181	HMAS Choules	Bay-Class	LCVP Landing Craft	L100
2018	180	HMAS Hobart	Hobart Class	Destroyer, Guided Missile	DDG-39
2017	179	HMAS Choules	Bay-Class	LCVP Landing Craft	L100
2016	178	HMAS Stuart	ANZAC Frigate	Destroyer	FFH-153
2015	177	HMAS Sydney	Adelaide Class	Destroyer, Guided Missile	FFG-03
2014	176	HMAS Tobruk	Round Table Class	Landing Ship, Heavy	L50
2013	175	HMAS Sydney	Adelaide Class	Destroyer, Guided Missile	FFG-03
2012	174	HMAS Melville	Leeuwin Class	Survey Vessel	A 246
2011	173	HMAS Parramatta	ANZAC Frigate	Destroyer, Guided Missile	FFH 154
2010	172	HMS Lady Nelson		Survey Vessel	
2009	171	HMAS Stuart	ANZAC Frigate	Destroyer	FFH-153
2008	170	HMAS Parramatta	ANZAC Frigate	Destroyer	154
2006	168	HMAS Stuart	ANZAC Frigate	Destroyer	FFH-153
2005	167	HMAS Melbourne	Adelaide Class	Guided Missile Frigate	FFG-05
2004	166	HMAS Kanimbla	Kanimbla Class	Amphibous Landing Platform	L 51
2003	165	HMAS Manoora	Kanimbla Class	Amphibous Landing Platform	L 52
2002	164	HMAS Melbourne	Adelaide Class	Guided Missile Frigate	FFG-05
2001	163	HMAS Brisbane	Perth Class	Guided Missile Destroyer	D41
2000	162	HMAS Hobart	Perth Class	Guided Missile Destroyer	D39
1999	161	HMAS Perth	Perth Class	Guided Missile Destroyer	D38
1998	160	HMAS Torrens	River Class	Destroyer	DE-53
1997	159	HMAS Torrens	River Class	Destroyer	DE-53
1996	158	HMAS Torrens HMAS Swan	River ClassRiver Class	Destroyers	DE-53 DE-50
1995	157	HMAS Torrens HMAS Hobart	River ClassPerth Class	Destroyer Destroyer, Guided Missile	DE-53 D39
1994	156	HMAS Newcastle	ANZAC Frigate	Destroyer	FFG-06
1993	155	HMAS Ardent	Attack Class	Patrol Boat	P87
1992	154	HMAS Jervis Bay		Cargo Ferry	GT-203
1991	153	HMAS Jervis Bay		Cargo Ferry	GT-203
1990	152	HMAS Perth	Perth Class	Guided Missile Destroyer	D38
1989	151	HMAS Jervis Bay		Cargo Ferry	GT-203
1988	150	HMAS Stalwart		Maintenance Ship	D-215
1987	149	HMAS Hobart	Perth Class	Guided Missile Destroyer	D39
1986		HMAS Hobart HMAS CanberraHMAS Darwin	Perth ClassAdelaide ClassAdelaide Class	Destroyer, Guided Missile Destroyer, Guided Missile Destroyer, Guided Missile	D39 FFG-04 FFG-02
1985	147	HMAS Jervis Bay		Cargo Ferry	GT-203
1984	146	HMAS Hobart	Perth Class	Guided Missile Destroyer	D39
1983	145	HMAS Jervis Bay		Cargo Ferry	GT-203
1982	144	HMAS Torrens	River Class	Destroyer	DE53
1981	143	HMAS Swan	River Class	Destroyers	DE50
1980	142	HMAS Stalwart		Maintenance Ship	D215
1979	141	HMAS Swan	River Class	Destroyer	DE-50
1978	140	HMAS Stalwart		Maintenance Ship	D215
1977	139	HMAS Duchess	Daring Class	Destroyer	D154
1976	138	HMAS Duchess	Daring Class	Destroyer	D154
1975	137	HMAS Duchess	Daring Class	Destroyer	D154
1974	136	HMAS Swan	River Class	Destroyer	DE-50
1973	135	HMAS ANZAC	Battle Class	Destroyer	D59
1972	134	HMAS ANZAC	Battle Class	Destroyer	D59
1971	133	HMAS Sydney (III)	Majestic Class	Aircraft Carrier	R17
1970	132	HMAS Stalwart		Maintenance Ship	D215
1969	131	HMAS Paramatta	River Class	Destroyer	DE46
1968	130	HMAS Vendetta	Daring Class	Destroyer	D08
1967	129 - Cancelled	HMAS Derwent	River Class	Destroyer	DE49
1966	128	HMAS Paramatta	River Class	Destroyer	DE46
1965	127	HMAS Sydney (III)	Majestic Class	Aircraft Carrier	R17
1964	126	HMAS Gascoyne	River Class	Destroyer	K354
1963	125	HMAS Quickmatch	River Class	Destroyer	G92
1962	124	HMAS Voyager	Daring Class	Destroyer	D04
1961	123	HMAS Swan	River Class	Destroyer	DE-50
1960	122	HMS St Brides Bay	Bay Class	Anti Aircraft Frigate	K600
1959	121	HMS Cossack	C Class	Destroyer	R57
1958	120	USS Blue	Allen M. Sumner Class	Destroyer	DD-774
1957	119	HMAS Sydney (III)	Majestic Class	Aircraft Carrier	R17
1956	118	HMAS Arunta	Tribal Class	Destroyer	I30
1955	117	HMAS Arunta	Tribal Class	Destroyer	I30
1954	116	HMAS Quadrant	Q Class	Destroyer	G67/D17
1953	115	HMAS Sydney	Majestic Class	Aircraft Carrier	R17
1952	114	HMAS Condamine	River Class	Destroyer	K698
1951	113	HMAS Latrobe	Bathurst Class	Corvette	J234/M234
1950	112	HMAS Bataan	Tribal Class	Destroyer	I91
1949	111	HMAS Australia	County Class	Heavy Cruiser	D84
1948	110	HMAS Australia	County Class	Heavy Cruiser	D84
1947	109	HMAS Quickmatch	River Class	Destroyer	G92
1946	108	HMS Bermuda	Fiji Class	Cruiser	52
1945	107	S.S Marosa			
1944	106	HMAS - HDML 1321	Harbour Defence	Motor Launch	1327
1943	105	Sch. Abel Tasman			
1942	104	Sch. Kermandie			
1941	103	Sch. Alma Doepel			
1940	102	S.S Talune			
1939	101	HMAS Hobart	Leander Class	Light Cruiser	D63
1938	100	HMAS Canberra (I)	Country Class	Heavy Cruiser	D33
1937	99	HMAS Canberra (I)	Country Class	Heavy Cruiser	D33
1936	98	Ketch Eva Leeta			
1935	97	Ketch Eva Leeta			
1934	96	Sch. Alma Doepel			
1933	95	H.M.A.S. Albatross			
1932	94	H.M.A.S. Australia			
1931	93	H.M.A.S. Canberra			
1930	92	H.M.A.S. Australia			
1929		HMAS Australia			D84
1928	90	H.M.A.S. Sydney			
1927	89	H.M.A.S. Sydney			
1926	88	H.I.J.M.S. Iwate			
1925	87	H.M.A.S. Platypus			
1924	86	H.M.A.S. Melbourne			
1923	85	H.M.A.S. Melbourne			
1922	84	H.M.A.S. Sydney			
1921	83	H.M.A.S. Sydney			
1920	82	H.M.A.S. Australia			
1919	81	Bq. Wild Wave			
1918	80	V.T.S. Dart			
1917	79	Ketch Alice			
1916	78	Ketch Alice			
1915	77	Ship Lotus			
1914	76	H.M.A.S. Warrego			
1913	75	H.M.S. Torch			
1912	74	H.M.S. Psyche			
1911	73	H.M.S. Pyranus			
1910	72	H.M.S. Pyranus			
1909	71	H.M.S. Powerful			
1908	70	S.S. Westralia			
1907	69	H.M.S. Cambrian			
1906	68	H.M.S. Powerful			
1905	67	H.M.S. Roy Arthur			
1904	66	H.M.S. Torch			
1903	65	H.M.S. Dart			
1902	64	H.M.S. Sparrow			
1901	63	R.V.Y.C. Crusader			
1900	62	Bq. Wild Wave			
1899	61	Bq. Fortuna			
1898	60	H.M.S. Penguin			
1897	59	H.M.S. Pylades			
1896	58	H.M.S. Orlando			
1895	57	Bq. Asia			
1894	56	H.M.S. Boomerang			
1893	55	Bq. Kassa			
1892	54	Bq. Asia			
1891	53	S.S. Talune			
1890	52	Bq. Rambler			
1889	51	H.M.S. Egeria			
1888	50	H.M.S. Egeria			
1887	49	Bq. Loongana			
1886	48	S.S. Mangana			
1885	47	S.S. Esk			
1884	46	H.M.S. Diamond			
1883	45	H.M.S. Miranda			
1882	44	H.M.S. Emerald			
1881	43	H.M.S. Wolverine			
1880	42	H.M.S. Wolverine			
1879	41	Bq. Freetrader			
1877	40	S.S. Truganini			
1876	38	Bq. Victoria			
1876	39	H.M.S. Sappho			
1875	37	Bq. Acacia			
1874	36	Bq. Waratah			
1873	35	Govt. Sch. Harriet			
1872	34	H.M.S. Clio			
1871	33	H.M.S. Blanche			
1869	32	Bq. Eucalyptus			
1868	30	Bq. Wild Wave			
1868	31	Ship Ethel			
1866	29	Bq. Ranger			
1865	28	Sch. Swordfish			
1864	27	Sch. Swordfish			
1863	26	Bq. Thomas Brown			
1862	25	Bq. Cantero			
1861	23	Brig. Dart			
1861	24	S.S. Tasmania			
1860	22	S.S. Tasmania			
1859	21	H.M.S. Iris			
1857	20	Sch. North Star			
1856	18	Bq. Antipodes			
1856	19	Bq. Fair Tasmanian			
1855	17	Brig. Australasian			
1854	16	Sch. Water Lily			
1853	15	Sch. Water Lily			
1852	14	Sch. Water Lily			
1850	13	Sch. Flying Fish			
1849	12	Vsl. Martha			
1848	11	Bq. Pacific			
1847	10	Bq. Pacific			
1846	9	Sch. Flying Fish			
1845	8	Sch. Letitia			
1844	7	Bq. Frances			
1843	6	Duke of Roxburgh			
1842	5	Bq. Brilliant			
1841	4	Govt. Sch. Eliza			
1840	3	Govt. Sch. Eliza			
1839	2	Govt. Sch. Eliza			
1838	1	Govt. Sch. Eliza			

== See also ==
- List of events in Tasmania
