= Swan (ship) =

Several ships have been named Swan for the swan:

- Swan (privateer ship) was sailed by Francis Drake in 1572–1573.
- Swan (1800 ship) was launched at Greenock in 1800. She traded widely until in 1805 she became a slave ship. She was lost in 1806 while delivering her slaves.
- Swan (1808 ship) was launched at Flensburg in 1806. By 1808 Samuel Enderby & Sons had acquired her. Between 1808 and 1810 she made one whaling voyage during which she rediscovered Bouvet Island. Enderby's sold her and from 1811 on she traded widely. Then in 1823 Enderbys repurchased her and she made two more whaling voyages for them. She then became a West Indiaman and was last listed in 1833.

== See also ==
- HMS Swan – one of 20 ships of the British Royal Navy
- USS Swan – one of three ships of the United States Navy
