= Yankalilla Bay =

Bay in South Australia

Coordinates: 35.46°S 138.28°E

Yankalilla Bay is a long, wide bay in south-eastern South Australia, on the Fleurieu Peninsula. It is on the south-eastern coast of the Gulf St Vincent, as it opens into the Southern Ocean.

Three rivers discharge into the bay: the Bungala River, Yankalilla River (whose mouth is at Lady Bay) and Carrickalinga Creek. The rivers can adversely affect the ecology of the sea, in particular the health of the reef and seagrass. Normanville Beach and Carrickalinga Reef.

Yankalilla Bay is known for being the site of the ship's graveyard of HMAS Hobart, which was scuttled on 5 November 2002 off the coast between Wirrina Cove and Normanville to create a dive wreck and artificial reef. Its official name is the Fleurieu Artificial Reef. The HMAS Hobart Memorial Lookout is located at Little Gorge.
