= HMAS Swan (DE 50) =

Australian naval ship, built 1970

History

Australia
- Namesake: The Swan River
- Builder: Williamstown Dockyard
- Laid down: 16 February 1965
- Launched: 16 December 1967
- Commissioned: 20 January 1970
- Decommissioned: 13 September 1996
- Motto: "Forward"
- Nickname(s): "Fluffy Duck" or "Duck", "Swarrens"
- Honours and awards: Four inherited battle honours
- Fate: Sunk as dive wreck in 1997
- Badge

General characteristics
- Class & type: River-class destroyer escort
- Displacement: 2,700 tons
- Length: 372 ft (113 m)
- Beam: 41 ft (12 m)
- Draught: 15 ft (4.6 m)
- Propulsion: 2 × English Electric steam turbines; 2 shafts; 30,000 shp (22,000 kW)
- Speed: 30 knots (56 km/h; 35 mph)
- Sensors & processing systems: 1979: Mulloka sonar system; AN/SPS-55 surface-search/navigation radar
- Armament: 2 × 4.5-inch (110 mm) Mk 6 gun; 1 × Limbo Mk 10 anti-submarine mortar (removed 1984); 1 × quad Seacat surface-to-air launcher; 1 × Ikara anti-submarine warfare system (installed 1973); 2 × triple-barrel Mk 32 torpedo tubes

HMAS Swan (DE 50), named for the Swan River, was a River-class destroyer escort of the Royal Australian Navy (RAN). Constructed in Melbourne following the loss of HMAS Voyager, Swan entered service in 1970.

During her career, the ship was deployed to South East Asia on several occasions as part of ANZUK forces. She was modernised in the mid-1980s, then was assigned to the recently opened west coast naval base HMAS Stirling. Following the integration of women into the RAN, Swan was the site of sexual harassment and discrimination claims, leading to an Australian Defence Force-wide inquiry.

Swan paid off in 1996, and was sunk as a dive wreck off the coast of Dunsborough, Western Australia at the end of 1997.

== Construction ==
Swan and sister ship HMAS Torrens were ordered in 1964 as replacements for HMAS Voyager, a destroyer lost following a collision with the aircraft carrier HMAS Melbourne in 1964. Although intended to be the same as the previous River-class ships (themselves based on the British Type 12 frigate), the design was changed from 1965 to incorporate many of the improvements of the British Leander-class frigates. Work on the two vessels started without specifications or a contract, and the evolving design meant changes were being made as the ships were being constructed, with resulting delays and cost increases attributed to a lack of planning.

Swan was laid down by the Williamstown Dockyard at Melbourne, Victoria on 16 February 1965, and was launched on 16 December 1967 by the wife of the Minister for the Navy, Allen Fairhall. The launching ceremony did not go entirely to plan; it took 11 attempts to smash the ceremonial bottle of champagne to christen Swan. Although the ship had not been completed, she was commissioned into the RAN on 20 January 1970. She was the third ship of the RAN to be named for the Swan River in Western Australia. Swan cost $22 million to build.

== Operational history ==
=== 1970–1983 ===
In October 1970, Swan sailed to Fiji, and was present in Suva on 10 October when the former British colony was granted independence. The warship was deployed to Singapore on 16 September 1971 for her first and only deployment to the Far East Strategic Reserve, which was replaced by ANZUK on 1 November. Swan operated as part of ANZUK until April 1972, during which she visited Japanese ports, served as escort to the Royal Yacht Britannia during a Royal Visit to Thailand, and participated in SEATO Exercise Sea Hawk. On her return to Australia on 17 April, the ship underwent maintenance, then spent the rest of the year on training exercises. After more exercises during the first third of 1973, Swan was docked at Williamstown for a refit from early April to early October, during which an Ikara missile system was installed. Sea trials and exercises took up the rest of 1973.

1974 started with Swan deploying to Hobart to serve as flagship for the Royal Hobart Regatta. On 25 May, Swan received a distress call from the disabled yacht Cutty Sark: despite rough seas and high winds, swimmers from the warship were able to recover the yacht's crew. In October, the ship sailed to Singapore for a deployment as part of the ANZUK force, and on the organisation's disbandment at the start of 1975, served as the Australian contribution to the Five Power Agreement. During the ship's time in South East Asia, which ended in April 1975, she visited multiple ports, participated in three multinational exercises, and received news that she had been awarded the Gloucester Cup for 1947, recognising her as the most efficient ship in the RAN. After returning to Sydney on 14 April, Swan spent the rest of the year alternating between maintenance dockings and training exercises. The early part of 1976 was spent performing port visits around Australia, before Swan docked at Williamstown for a refit, which lasted from May 1976 to February 1977.

During 1977, amongst training exercises and maintenance dockings, Swan participated in SINDEX 77, a multinational exercise in the Indian Ocean. After training exercises in early 1978, Swan was forced to make an emergency docking in early March because of leakage on a stern gland. In early May, the warship was tasked with finding the yachtsman from Josephine II, which had run aground on Middleton Reef, but was unsuccessful (the sailor was later found at sea by another ship). Swan participated in several major fleet exercises during the latter part of the year. On 18 January 1979, while docked alongside the destroyer tender HMAS Stalwart at Garden Island, Swan was evacuated when a bomb threat was made against the tender. After port visits along the eastern Australian coast, the warship underwent a maintenance docking for the majority of the year.

In March 1980, Swan was deployed to South East Asia for five months. On 17 April the ship visited Singapore at the start of the deployment in South-east Asian waters, "for the first of three 'show the flag' visits. During this trip she visited 18 ports in eight countries, and also rescued 72 refugees from an overloaded 35-foot (11 m) boat in the South China Sea on 17 June. The Minister for Immigration and Ethnic Affairs, Ian Macphee, announced that Australia would accept responsibility for the refugees. The warship returned to its home port of Sydney in late August, and underwent a short maintenance period before visiting New Zealand near the end of the year. Swan returned to the Pacific and South East Asia for a seven-month deployment in 1981, during which she visited 22 ports, starting in the South Pacific, travelling eastward to Hawaii, before returning to South East Asia. After "weathering a violent storm", Typhoon Agnes – part of the 1981 Pacific typhoon season – in the Yangtze Delta, she became the first Australian warship to visit China in 32 years (and the first following the formation of the People's Republic of China), and the first to participate in joint training exercises with the Japan Maritime Self-Defense Force. During 1982, Swan became the only ship of her type to use the Fremantle Public Works slipway, and the first warship to use the hydraulic lift at the West Australian Maritime Support Facility at Cockburn Sound. The ship embarked on five consecutive deployments in 1983, travelling throughout Australia, Asia, and the Pacific for port visits and multinational exercises.

=== 1984–1996 ===
At the start of 1984, Swan went into Williamstown for a 20-month modernisation. During this time, the Limbo anti-submarine mortar was removed and replaced with two triple-barrel Mark 32 torpedo launchers, while other upgrades to her capabilities were made. Near the end of the modernisation, a large number of components had to be scrounged from sister ship Torrens to make Swan operational: for a time, the ship came to be known as Swarrens, as she was reputed to be half-Swan, half-Torrens. Swan reentered service in September 1985, and in December became the second ship of her class to be based out of HMAS Stirling in Western Australia: she was better suited to operating from the less-advanced western base as she was did not need the specialised technical and logistics support required by the Perth-class destroyers and Adelaide-class frigates. Early 1986 was spent adjusting to operating conditions in the Indian Ocean, visiting ports along the western and northern Australian coasts, and undergoing training exercises. Mid-year, Swan undertook a two-month deployment to South East Asia. On her return, she spent the rest of the year alongside at Stirling for maintenance. Early 1987 followed the same pattern as the previous year's start, after which Swan sailed to Melbourne for a refit in March. This was completed in June, and after returning to Stirling, the ship travelled to the South China Sea to participate in the multinational Exercise Starfish. The rest of the year was spent undergoing training exercises with the United States, Malaysian, and Indonesian ships.

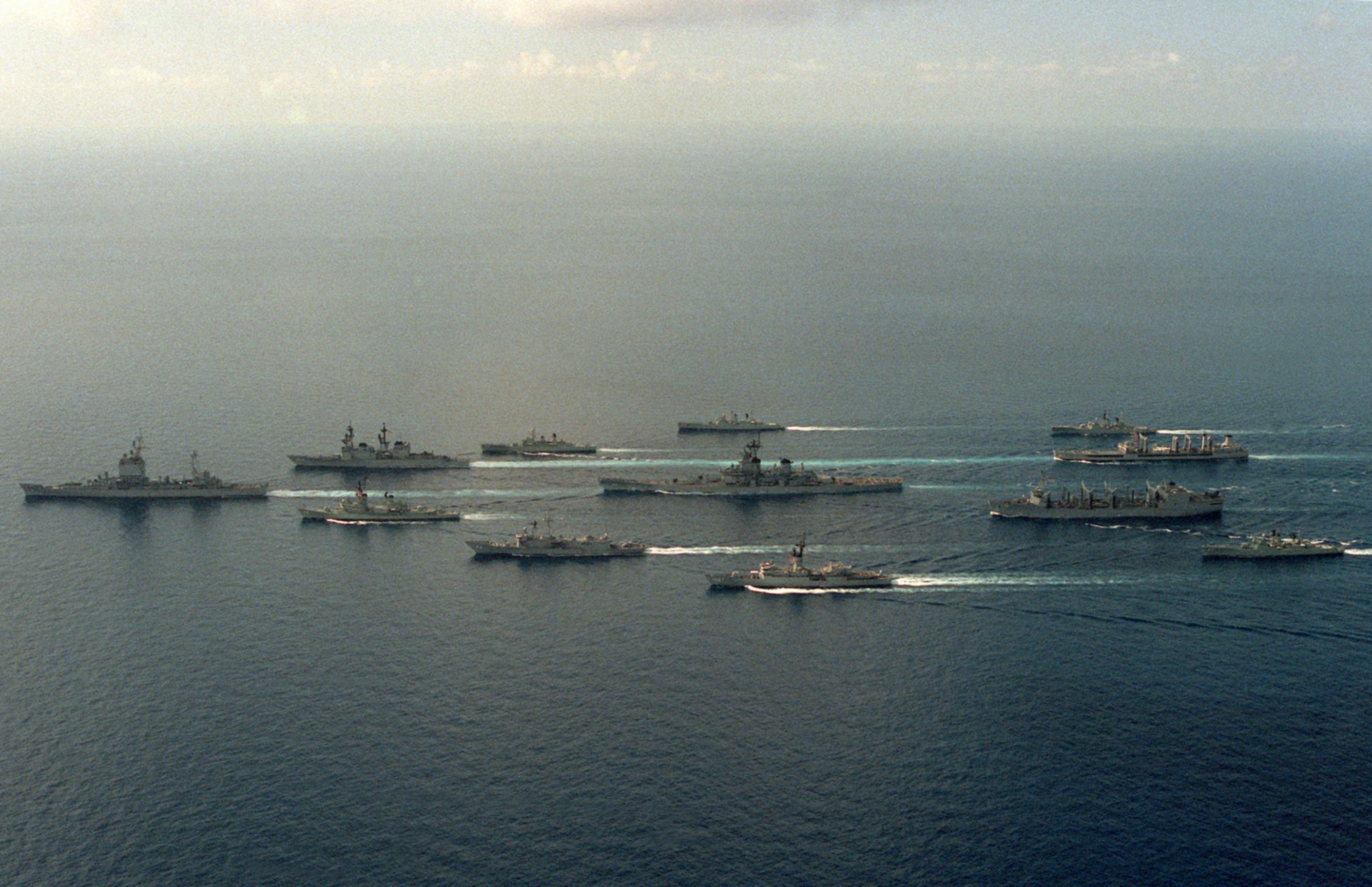
A United States Navy battleship battle group during a training exercise with Australian ships in July 1986. Swan is the upper ship in the third row from the left.

1988 started with a multitude of port visits to celebrate the Australian Bicentenary Year, followed by two deployments to South East Asia, the first from June until August, the second from October to January 1989. On her return, Swan was docked for a refit; she was the first RAN vessel to use the Jervoise Bay shiplift, and the first major warship refitted in Western Australia. The refit ran until September, and Swan spent the rest of the year undergoing training exercises. After visiting New Zealand and Sydney in early 1990, the ship embarked on a five-month deployment throughout Asia; travelling as far north as the top of Japan and participating in multiple training exercises with regional navies. 1991 started off with more training exercises and port visits. In April, all of the Ikara missiles carried by Swan were removed following fleet-wide instructions to cease use of the system. Another deployment to South East Asia was made from April to August, followed by a brief visit to the region in September and October: during the latter, Swan was called in to provide humanitarian assistance following the eruption of Mount Pinatubo. The warship visited South East Asia again from June to October 1992.

During the 1990s, women were integrated into the RAN. The hasty implementation and the lack of preparation or education caused problems aboard several ships, particularly Swan. In August 1992, a female Reserve medical officer reported that she had been sexually assaulted by a male officer. Although the male officer was acquitted at a court martial, other claims from female personnel aboard Swan came forward, including unsatisfactory living arrangement, sexual harassment, and gender-based discrimination. The Swan incidents became the centrepiece of an inquiry into sexual harassment across the Australian Defence Force (ADF), which found that although the rate of sexual harassment in the ADF was equal to other workforces, the attitudes and traditions evolved by the previously all-male military had to change.

The ship participated in multinational exercises off Darwin in May 1993, and after returning to Western Australia, made a series of port visits along the southern and eastern coasts of Australia while en route to Sydney. Swan then sailed to South East Asia to participate in multinational exercises, and returned to Stirling at the start of December. Maintenance and training exercises were carried out during early 1994, after which Swan left to circumnavigate Australia, visiting ports across Australia and in Indonesia during April, May, and June. On her return, Swan was docked for a refit, which lasted until the end of the year. 1995 saw the ship participate in fleet exercises around Australia: during a gunnery exercise off Shoalwater Bay, Swan fired 1081 4.5-inch (110 mm) shells, becoming the first RAN vessel since 1942 to fire her entire magazine in one event. In 1996, the destroyer escort was reclassified as a training ship. Swan was used to train midshipmen during the early part of the year, then sailed to Singapore for a final South East Asia deployment before returning to Fremantle to decommission.

== Decommissioning and fate ==
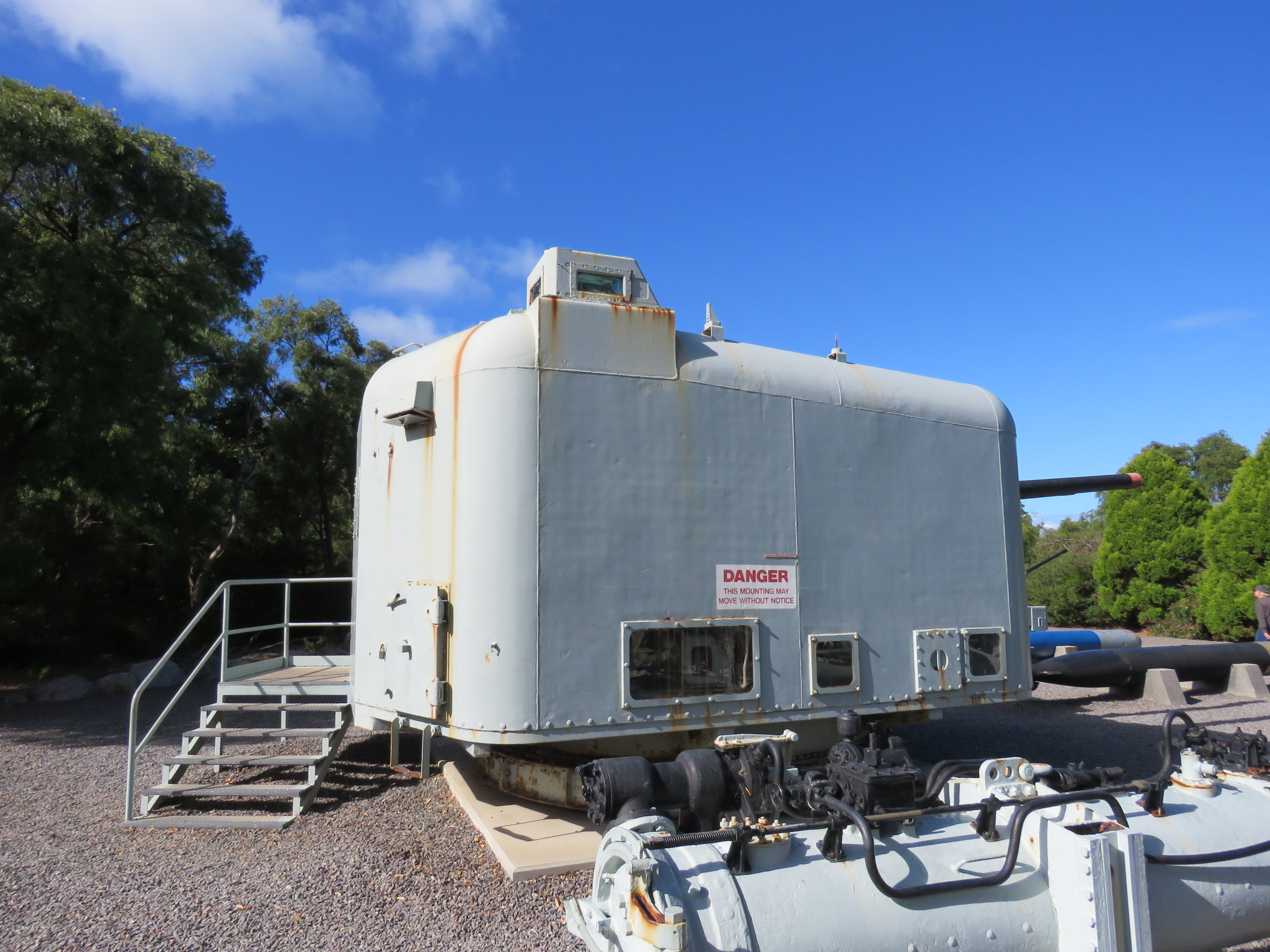
A QF 4.5-inch gun turret of HMAS Swan on display at the Princess Royal Fortress, Albany, Western Australia

Swan paid off on 13 September 1996. During her career, she travelled 775,870 nautical miles (1,436,910 km) during 56,982 hours spent at sea. In November, the Australian government gifted the ship to the state of Western Australia. On 11 November 1996, State Minister for Tourism Norman Moore announced that the ship would be given to the Geographe Bay Artificial Reef Society to be scuttled and made into an artificial reef and dive site; the first deliberately prepared dive wreck in the Southern Hemisphere.

Swan was towed to Bunbury, Western Australia, and over the next twelve months, the ship was cleared of environmental hazards (such as oil and plastics) and diver hazards (such as cabling), and had access holes cut. The engine and boiler rooms were sealed off. After preparations were completed, the ship was towed to a point 1.3 nautical miles (2.4 km) from Point Picquet (Meelup Beach), near Dunsborough, Western Australia. Swan was scuttled on the morning of 14 December 1997; an event observed by an estimated 10,000 spectators on shore, plus numerous spectator craft. The actual detonation was performed by a six-year-old child, whose father had won a raffle for the honour. Swan sank quickly at 33°33′02″S 115°06′02″E, in 30 metres (98 ft) of water, and came to rest on the sandy bottom in a nearly upright position. The wreck is marked with red buoys at the bow and stern.

Swan has been described as "an instant tourism hit"; A$2.4 million was contributed to the local economy through tourism earnings during 1998, and up to 15,000 dives are made at the site each year. The site is host to an estimated 100 different species of marine life. The wreck's popularity prompted the acquisition of the destroyer HMAS Perth and her sinking as a dive wreck off Albany, Western Australia in 2001.

Swan's 4.5-inch Mk V/Mk 6 gun turret is preserved at Princess Royal Fortress, Albany, Western Australia. This turret is open and accessible to visitors.
