= HMAS Swan =

Three ships of the Royal Australian Navy (RAN) have been named HMAS Swan, for the Swan River in Western Australia.

- HMAS Swan (D61), a River-class destroyer launched in 1915, decommissioned in 1928, and broken up for scrap
- HMAS Swan (U74), a Grimsby-class sloop launched in 1936, decommissioned in 1962, and broken up for scrap
- HMAS Swan (DE 50), a River-class destroyer escort launched in 1967, decommissioned in 1996, and scuttled as a dive wreck in 1997

== Battle honours ==
Ships named HMAS Swan are entitled to carry four battle honours:

- Adriatic 1917–18
- Darwin 1942
- Pacific 1941–45
- New Guinea 1943–44

== See also ==
- HMS Swan, twenty ships of the Royal Navy.
- USS Swan, three ships of the United States Navy.
