= Lady Bay, South Australia =

Lady Bay
- Coordinates: 35.4703°S 138.292370°E
- Country: Australia
- State: South Australia
- City: Normanville
- LGA: District Council of Yankalilla
- Location: 2 km (1.2 mi) south of Normanville
- Established: circa 1959
- Abolished: 1988

Lady Bay is the colloquial name given to a former settlement of 21 shacks in the Australian state of South Australia located in the locality of Normanville about 2 km (1 mi) south of the locality's 'town centre.' The area adjoining the former shack site includes "The Links Lady Bay" resort, which includes a hotel, golf course and a 1,100 housing site subdivision.

A proposal announced in 2008 by the developer of the "Lady Bay Estate" to create a new locality called "Lady Bay" from the existing locality of Normanville with the Bungala River as the boundary was "withdrawn by the developer in November 2009 following strong opposition by Normanville residents."

The mouth of the Yankalilla River is at Lady Bay.
