= USS Guadalupe (AO-32) =

Oiler of the United States Navy

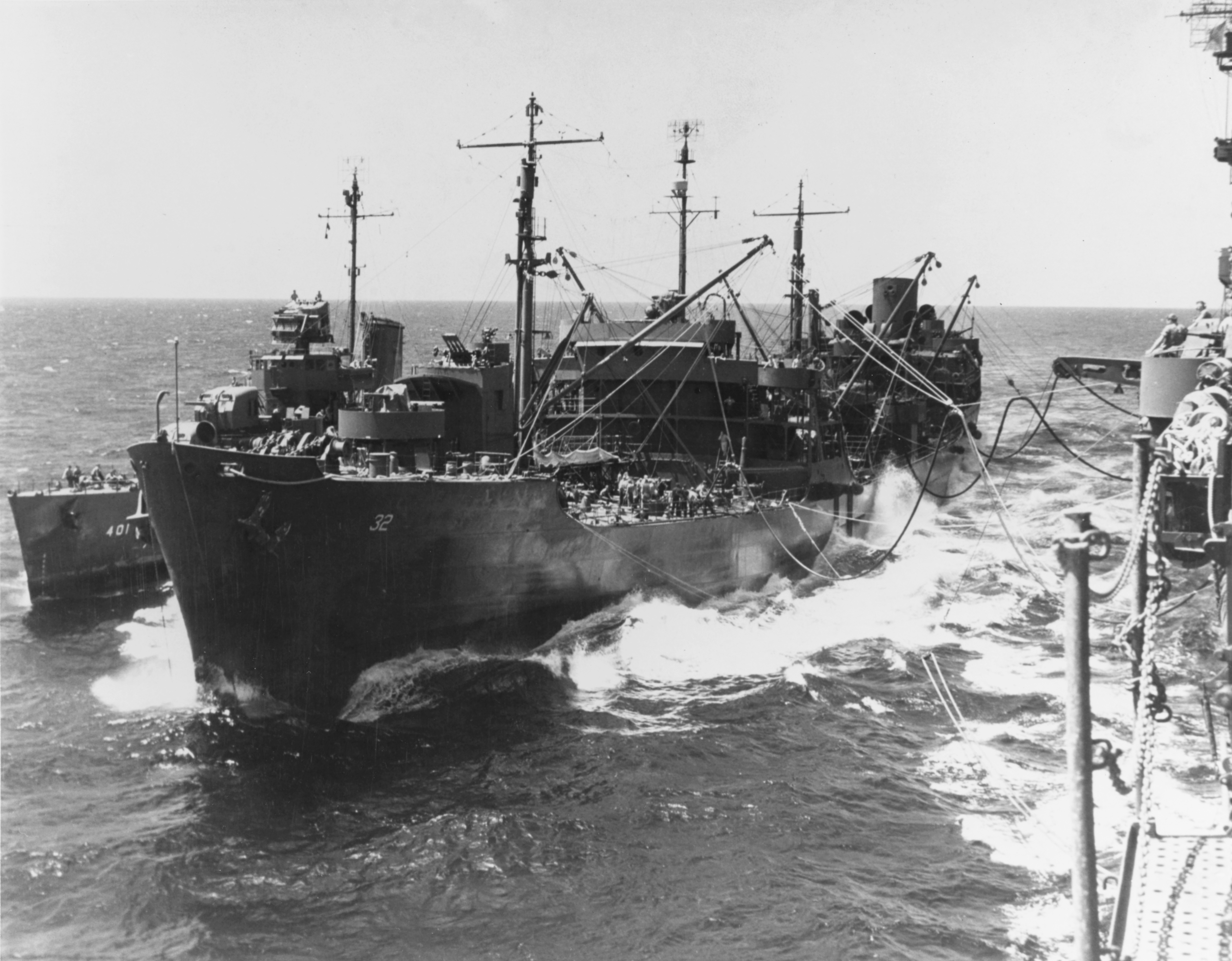
- Guadalupe refueling USS Lexington and USS Maury in 1943

History

United States
- Name: USS Guadalupe
- Namesake: Guadalupe River in Texas
- Builder: Newport News Shipbuilding & Dry Dock Company, Newport News, Virginia
- Launched: 26 January 1940
- Sponsored by: Mrs. W. L. Inslee
- Acquired: 1 June 1941
- Commissioned: 19 June 1941
- Decommissioned: 1974
- Stricken: 14 May 1975
- Fate: Sold for scrapping, 16 October 1975

General characteristics
- Class & type: Cimarron-class oiler
- Displacement: 7,470 long tons (7,590 t) light; 24,830 long tons (25,228 t) full
- Length: 553 ft (169 m)
- Beam: 75 ft (23 m)
- Draft: 32 ft 4 in (9.86 m)
- Propulsion: Twin screws, 30,400 shp (22,669 kW); Steam (600psi), NSFO
- Speed: 18 knots (33 km/h; 21 mph)
- Complement: 304
- Armament: 4 × 5 in (130 mm)/38 cal. guns (4×1); 4 × 40 mm AA guns; 4 × 20 mm AA guns

Service record
- Operations: World War II, Korean War, Vietnam War

USS Guadalupe (AO-32), a Cimarron-class fleet replenishment oiler that served in the United States Navy, it was named for the Guadalupe River in Texas.

== Construction, acquisition, and commissioning ==
Guadalupe was launched as SS Esso Raleigh 26 January 1940 by the Newport News Shipbuilding & Dry Dock Company at Newport News, Virginia; sponsored by Mrs. W. L. Inslee, wife of the late manager of the Traffic Division, Marine Department, Standard Oil of New Jersey; taken over by the Maritime Commission as MC Hull #12; acquired by the Navy 1 June 1941; and commissioned 19 June 1941.

== Pre-World War II ==
Six weeks of coastwise voyages carrying oil from Texas to New Jersey ended 16 August as Guadalupe docked at the Brooklyn Navy Yard. Receiving as deck cargo six PT boats later to form the famous squadron commanded by Lieutenant Commander John D. Bulkeley, Guadalupe sailed for the Western Pacific on 19 August. After discharging cargo and oil at Pearl Harbor, Manila, and Cavite, the tanker returned to Norfolk, Virginia 13 November via San Diego. After America's sudden plunge into war, she put into Baltimore to be fitted with guns.

== World War II ==
In January 1942 Guadalupe sailed to the Pacific, where she was to participate in virtually every major campaign of the long and bloody war. After months of developing and refining techniques for refueling at sea, a science then in its infancy, Guadalupe sailed from Pearl Harbor, Territory of Hawaii, on 2 June 1942 to refuel American ships participating in the Battle of Midway, on 5 June 1942 550 miles (890 km) east of Midway Atoll. About 04:00 the Japanese submarine I-156 sighted Guadalupe being escorted by two destroyers but failed to reach a favorable firing position. Except for I-168, I-156 was the only submarine that made contact with the Americans during the battle. From Midway Atoll Guadalupe sailed north to spend the rest of the summer supporting American forces in the Attu campaign.

As the United States launched its first offensive effort in the Pacific, Guadalupe sailed south to spend the final four months of 1942 fueling warships operating in and around Guadalcanal. The first half of 1943 saw her in overhaul in the United States and operating in the Aleutians, with two shuttle trips to Pearl Harbor with fuel and planes. Departing Pearl 22 August Guadalupe sailed to the central Pacific to support the Gilbert Islands campaign.

After a late winter overhaul, she returned to the Pacific theater in February 1944 operating in support of Vice Admiral Marc A. Mitscher's carrier force during the Truk campaign. A short break at Pearl Harbor ended as Guadalupe sailed on 11 May to operate in support of the US 5th Fleet during the Marianas campaign. From there she sailed in late August to support Admiral William F. Halsey's US 3rd Fleet in action against the Japanese in the Palau Islands and Philippines operating areas. One of her major tasks was refueling ships during the Battle of Leyte Gulf.

On 29 December 1944 Guadalupe sailed from Ulithi with units of Task Force 38, then preparing for the invasion of Lingayen Gulf. Joining a fast carrier strike force under Vice Admiral John S. McCain, Sr., Guadalupe steamed through Luzon Strait into the South China Sea on the night of 9–10 January 1945, concurrent with the first invasion waves on Lingayen Gulf. During the transit of the strait, another tanker, USS Nantahala, collided with Guadalupe, putting a large hole in the bow. Jury-rigged repairs enabled Guadalupe to continue with the fast carrier group as they conducted strikes against Japanese positions on Formosa and along the China coast.

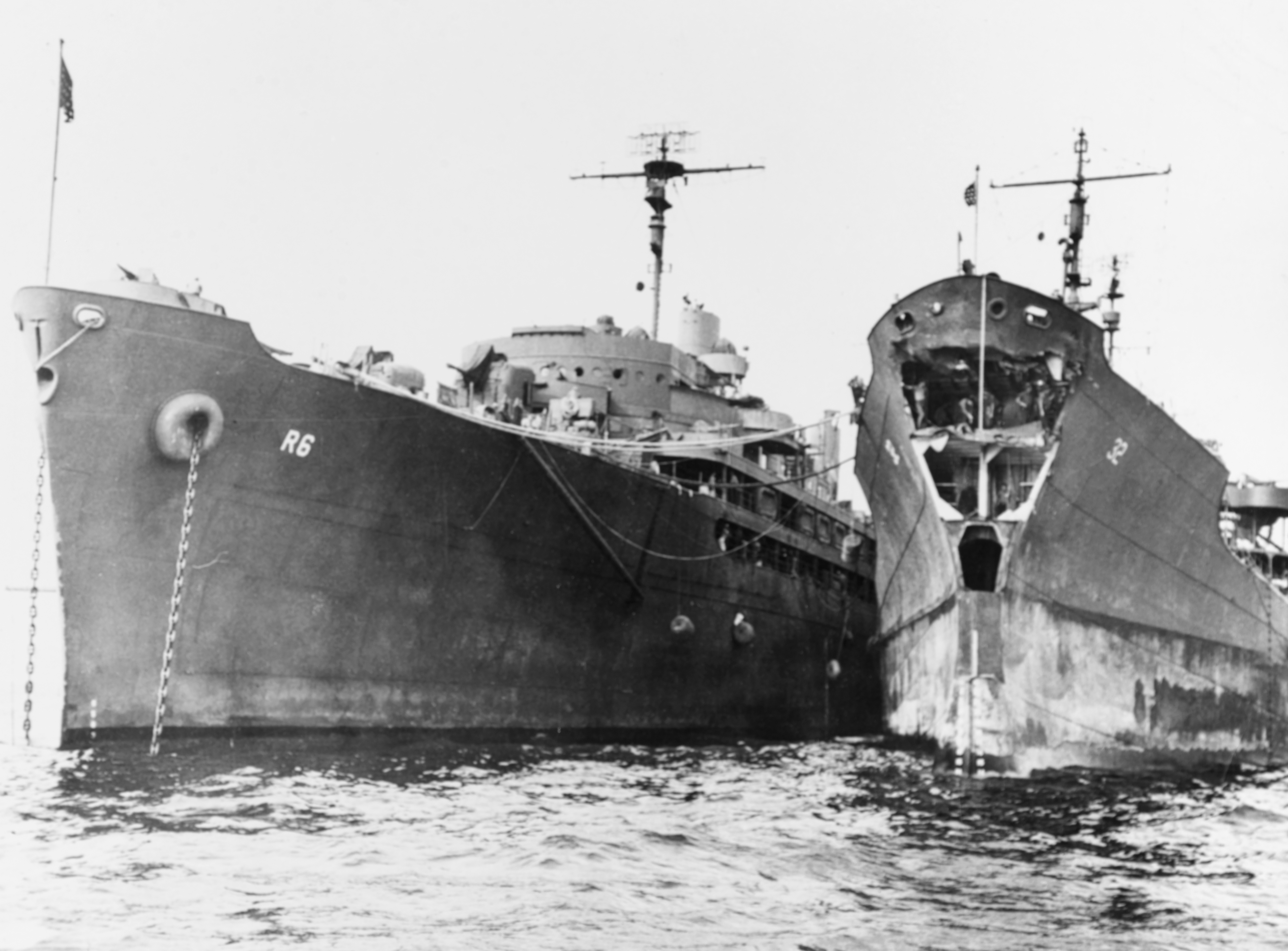
USS Ajax repairing Guadalupe at Ulithi on 9 February 1945

A month's availability at Ulithi to repair her damaged bow ended in late February and Guadalupe again steamed for battle, this time operating in support of the Iwo Jima invasion. After two weeks off Iwo Jima, 24 February to 7 March, Guadalupe returned empty to Ulithi to prepare for her role in the Okinawa campaign. Departing Ulithi on 25 March 1945, Guadalupe spent three weeks off Okinawa, returned to Ulithi for more fuel, and then spent another three weeks off Okinawa. As the struggle raged on the island, the Americans' last campaign in the Pacific before the Japanese home islands, Guadalupe operated through heavy weather and high seas to provide other services, as well as her normal duties of refueling the giant invasion fleet, largest ever assembled in the Pacific.

Okinawa marked the end of Guadalupe's service in the Pacific war. She sailed for the United States and overhaul on 24 May, and was two days out of Pearl Harbor on her way back to the fleet when the Japanese surrender ended the war on 15 August 1945. From Pearl Harbor, Guadalupe went to Jinsen, Korea, where she replenished units of the US 7th Fleet occupying Yellow Sea ports. The tanker sailed for Okinawa on 22 October and remained there through 1945.

== Post-War operations ==
In the post-war period Guadalupe remained on duty in the Pacific, supplying fuel oil to American units in Japan, China, Korea, the Philippines, and scores of islands. Some of this fuel oil she picked up at Bahrain, Arabia, as she sailed from the Far East to Norfolk via the Suez Canal and Gibraltar in 1948, returning over the same route.

== Korean War ==
When North Korean Communist troops crossed the 38th parallel on 24 June 1950, Guadalupe was undergoing repairs at Long Beach, California, but quickly re-entered service. Sailing for the Pacific on 29 July, she spent three months shuttling fuel oil between Hawaii, Kwajalein, and Guam before joining the 7th Fleet at Sasebo, Japan, 1 December 1950. Operating with various units of the fleet, Guadalupe visited Okinawa, Hong Kong, and Formosa in addition to refueling American and United Nations ships in the Korean replenishment area. She also sailed along the Korean coast to support the siege of Wonsan harbor.

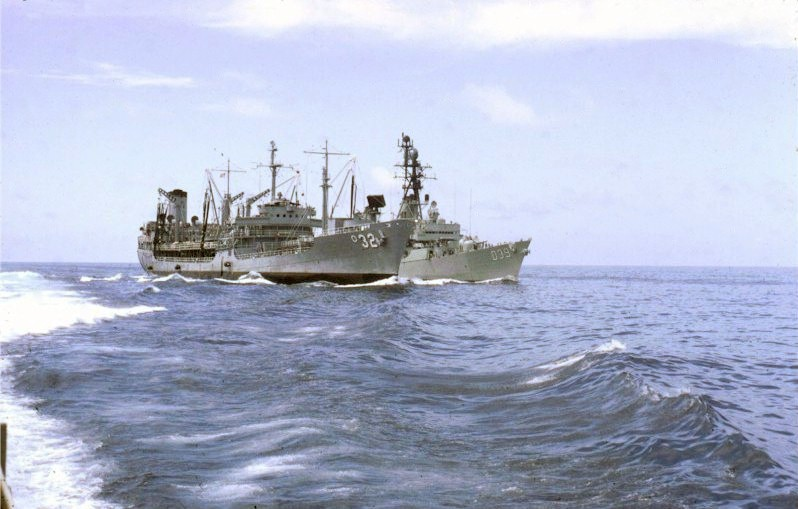
Guadalupe refueling HMAS Hobart in 1967

Guadalupe returned to the Pacific to support American forces on the Formosa Patrol and training operations in August 1953. From that time, the tanker's year settled into a routine of six months deployment with the 7th Fleet and six months operating out of Long Beach. In her Far East operations, Guadalupe also visited every major Pacific port.

== Later career ==
Guadalupe continued her service through the Vietnam War and made a brief appearance in the 1965 film In Harm's Way with John Wayne and Kirk Douglas. She was decommissioned in 1974 and struck from the Navy List 14 May 1975. She was transferred to the Maritime Administration and sold for scrapping 16 October 1975.

== Awards ==
- Meritorious Unit Commendation
- American Defense Service Medal
- Asiatic–Pacific Campaign Medal with 13 battle stars
- World War II Victory Medal
- Navy Occupation Medal with "ASIA" clasp
- China Service Medal
- National Defense Service Medal with star
- Korean Service Medal with 5 battle stars
- Armed Forces Expeditionary Medal with 2 stars
- Vietnam Service Medal with 15 campaign stars
- United Nations Korea Medal
- Republic of Vietnam Campaign Medal
