= Wirrina Cove =

- Suburb
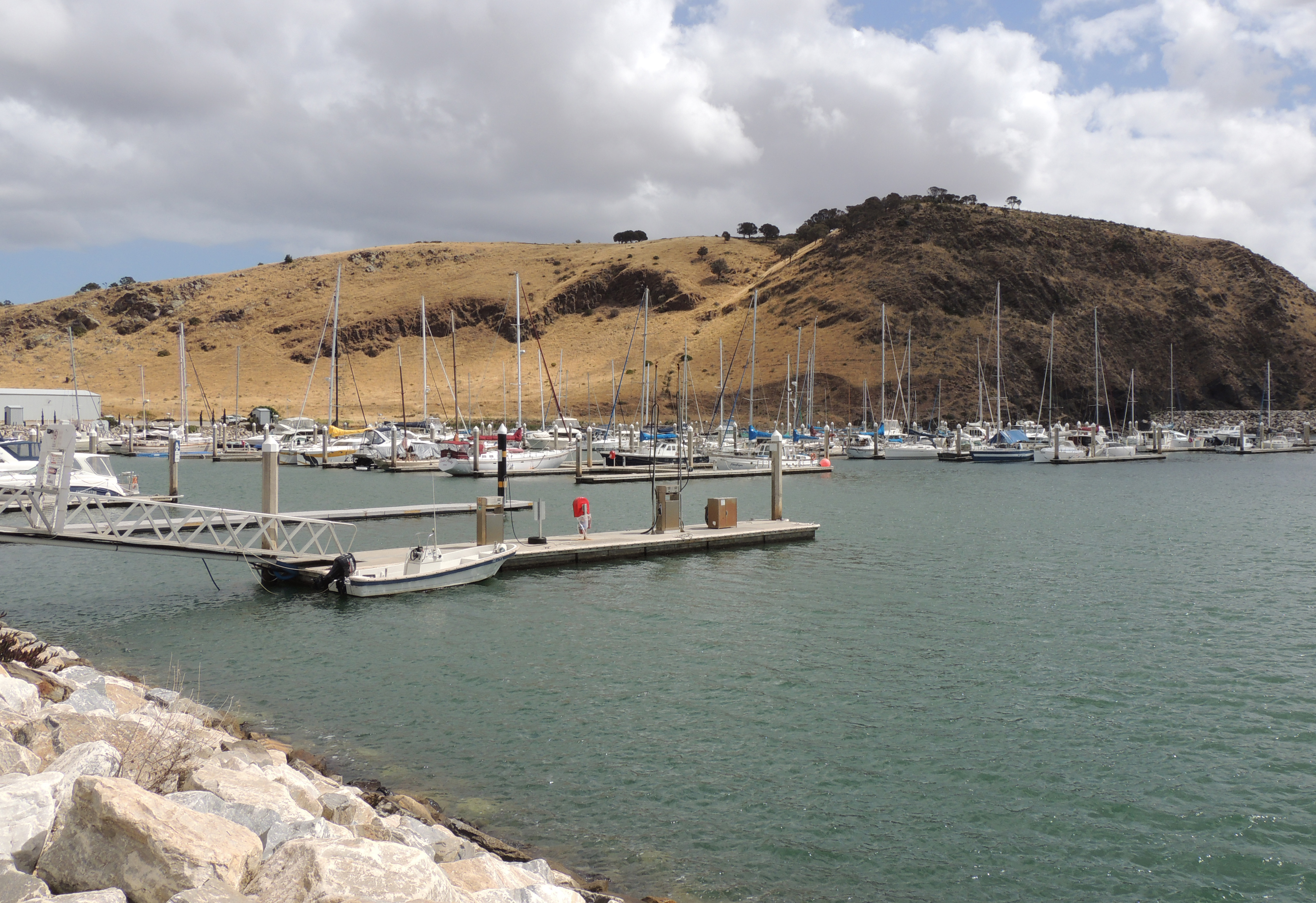
- Marina St. Vincent, Wirrina Cove

- Coordinates: 35.495613°S 138.268250°E
- Country: Australia
- State: South Australia
- Region: Fleurieu and Kangaroo Island
- LGA: District Council of Yankalilla
- Location: 70 km (43 mi) south west of Adelaide city centre
- Established: 1999

Government
  - State electorate: Mawson
  - Federal division: Mayo

Population
  - Total: 497 (shared with other localities in the “State Suburb of Wirrina Cove”) (2011 census)
- Time zone: UTC+9:30 (ACST)
  - Summer (DST): UTC+10:30 (ACST)
- Postcode: 5204
- Mean max temp: 17.5 °C (63.5 °F)
- Mean min temp: 10.2 °C (50.4 °F)
- Annual rainfall: 818.9 mm (32.24 in)
Suburbs around Wirrina Cove
Gulf St Vincent	Gulf St Vincent	Gulf St Vincent
Second Valley	Wirrina Cove	Normanville
Second Valley	Second Valley	Hay Flat
- Location; Climatic data

Wirrina Cove is a locality and holiday resort on the Fleurieu Peninsula, South Australia. It is located between the coastal towns of Second Valley and Normanville on Yankalilla Bay. The holiday resort was developed from around 1972, and is located about 90 kilometres (56 mi) south of Adelaide.

There are various overlapping names associated with the Wirrina Cove area recorded as being used by the Kaurna people before the British colonisation of South Australia: Congeratinga (with a creek now given that name), also spelt Kongaratinga, Yarnauwingga, and Anacotilla. The location is also associated with the Dreaming story of the creator ancestor Tjilbruke.

Today, features at Wirrina cove include marina named Marina St. Vincent, the New Terry Hotel & Golf Resort, a variety of camping and other holiday accommodation at the Wirrina Cove Holiday Park other accommodation options.

Little Gorge, near which the HMAS Hobart Memorial Lookout is located, is north of the cove, on the road to Normanville.

== Kaurna history ==
Before European settlement, the Wirrina Cove area, along with most of the Adelaide plains area and down the western side of the Fleurieu Peninsula, was inhabited by the traditional owners, the Kaurna people. There is a significant site associated with the Kaurna Dreaming of the creator ancestor Tjilbruke, where his tears are said to have created a freshwater spring there. This is the sixth spring on the Tjilbruke Dreaming Trail, and there is a commemorative plaque at the entrance forecourt to Wirrina Cove Resort.

Other Kaurna names associated with the area are Congeratinga / Kongaratinga, Yarnauwingga, and Anacotilla, although their origins are not clear. The name Kongarati Cave (Norman Tindale spelling) is also associated with the Tjilbruke story, as being near Rapid Bay.

== "Wirrina" name origin ==
The word "Wirrina" is not a Kaurna word or word from a South Australian language. The original developers of the resort, Holiday Village Co-operative Ltd, adopted the name in 1972, probably extracting it from H.M. Cooper’s Australian Aboriginal Words and Their Meanings (1949). Cooper lists it as meaning "Somewhere to go”, and the word is thought to originate in an interstate language group, possibly from the Gwydir and Barwon Rivers of New South Wales.

== Ecology ==
There is a creek known as Congeratina Creek, recorded in 2015 as a "flowing brackish creek in autumn 2015 but dry in spring", with the aquatic ecosystem in "fair" condition. The surrounding vegetation was described as "mostly introduced weedy species and gum trees with cattle grazing beyond".

== Resort and land ownership ==
The resort did well in the 1980s, but after that it changed hands five times before falling into receivership in 1992. After being bought again it briefly revived, and was refurbished in 1995–6, but again fell into receivership in 2012, after losing a million dollars a year.

The whole package of land owned, by David Whyte of BDO and Wirrina Corporation Pty Ltd, including the resort, caravan park, marina berths and lease, and some developed and undeveloped land, was broken up at the time of sale in 2013, with a total of A$9,954,782 paid for the acquisitions.

The Auckland-based hotel chain VR Group bought the resort, and spent over A$1.5 million on upgrading most of the 87 rooms, the tennis courts, mini-golf course and gym, ready to re-open in April 2014.

In 2019 the resort again changed hands, renamed the New Terry Hotel & Golf Resort and packaged to attract Chinese tourists by its new owner Andie Xu. The name is derived from the sound of Chinese words meaning peace, te and success, rry, and the menu features both Chinese and Australian dishes. Accommodation and other facilities are available at the resort.

== Marina ==
The Wirrina Cove marina received planning approval from the Government of South Australia in 1988. Construction was expected to start in 1989 and take 10 months to complete. It was intended to support regional tourism opportunities, including sunset cruises and day trips across Backstairs Passage to Kangaroo Island. At the time of its construction, it was described as a $45 million project. After its completion, the marina was renamed Marina St. Vincent.

The state government took over ownership of the 210-berth Wirrina Cove Marina (Marina St Vincent) on 30 March 2020, with staff from the Department of Planning, Transport and Infrastructure (now Dept of Infrastructure and Transport) having responsibility for day-to-day operations. This came after a long court battle, when the Supreme Court of South Australia gave an eviction notice to Stephen Marks and his company New Wave Aerospace (NWA) in March 2020. The order was made because of an unpaid bill for dredging, worth about A$250,000. The site was reported to be "in a state of disrepair, with discarded assets strewn across the site" in June 2020, with berth-holders concerned about their losses.

== Other attraction ==
The HMAS Hobart Memorial Lookout is located is north of the cove, near Little Gorge, on the road to Normanville. It provides viewing of the Fleurieu Artificial Reef created by the sinking of the ship.
