= HMAS Hobart (D 39) =

Royal Australian Navy scuttled shipwreck

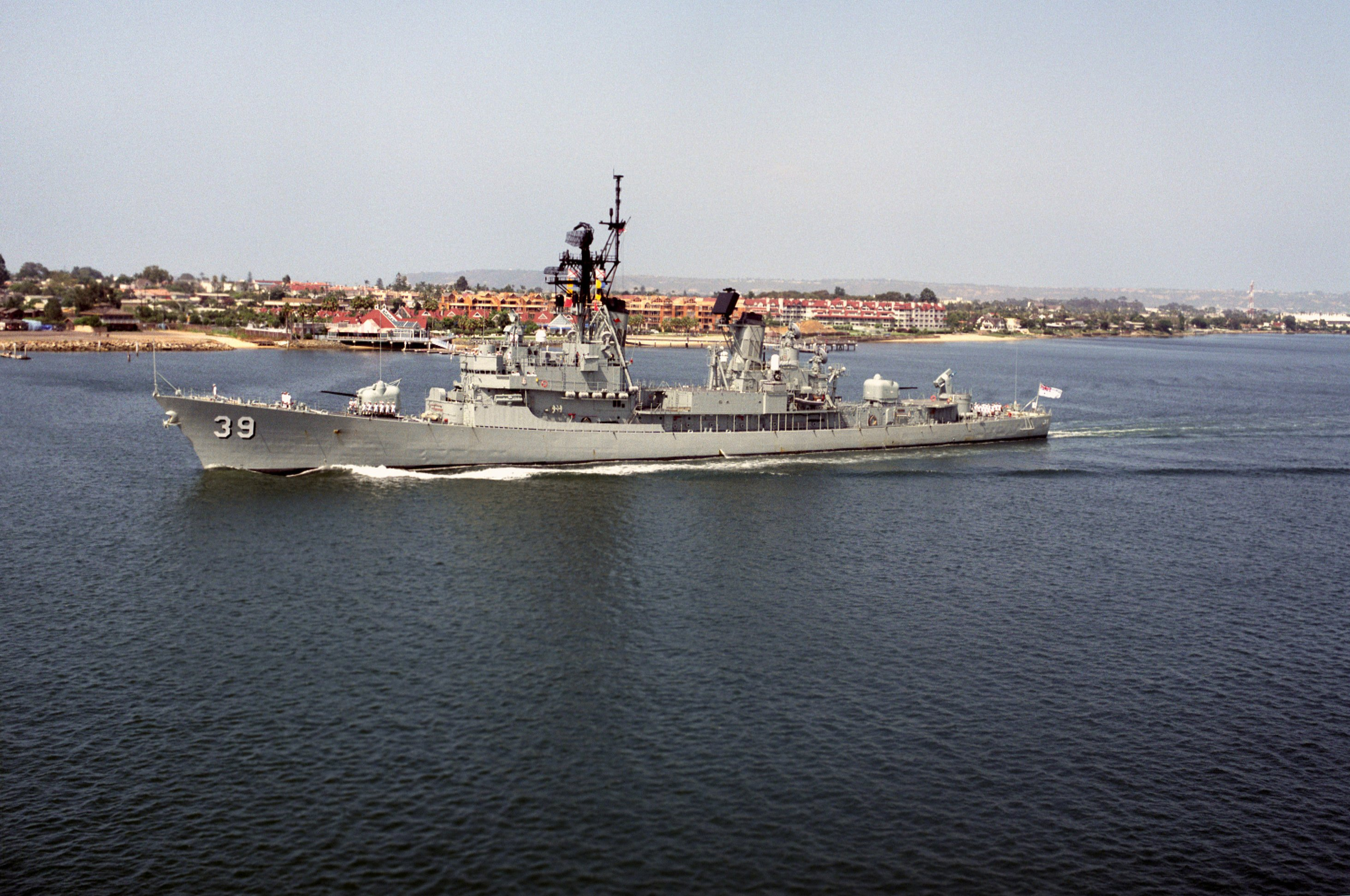
- HMAS Hobart in California, 1992

History

Australia
- Namesake: City of Hobart
- Builder: Defoe Shipbuilding Company, Michigan, US
- Laid down: 26 October 1962
- Launched: 9 January 1964
- Commissioned: 18 December 1965
- Decommissioned: 12 May 2000
- Motto: "Sic Fortis Hobartia Crevit" (Thus Did Hobart Grow Strong)
- Honours and awards: Battle honours: Vietnam 1967–70; plus eight inherited honours; Awards: Navy Unit Commendation (United States)
- Fate: Sunk as dive wreck 5 November 2002

General characteristics
- Class & type: Perth-class guided missile destroyer
- Displacement: 3,370 tons standard; 4,618 tons full load
- Length: 440 ft 3 in (134.19 m) length overall; 420 ft (130 m) between perpendiculars
- Beam: 47 ft 1 in (14.35 m)
- Draught: 15 ft 3 in (4.65 m) maximum
- Propulsion: 2 × General Electric steam turbines, 70,000 shp (52,000 kW), 2 shafts
- Speed: 35 knots (65 km/h; 40 mph)
- Range: 6,000 nautical miles (11,000 km; 6,900 mi) at 15 knots (28 km/h; 17 mph)
- Complement: 20 officers, 312 sailors
- Armament: 1 × Mk 13 launcher for Tartar, then Standard missiles; 2 × 5"/54 caliber Mark 42 guns; 2 × Mark 32 triple torpedo tube sets; 2 × Ikara anti-submarine missile launchers (removed 1989); 2 × Phalanx CIWS (installed 1991)

HMAS Hobart (D 39) was a Perth-class guided missile destroyer of the Royal Australian Navy (RAN). Built in the United States of America to a slight variant of the United States Navy (USN) Charles F. Adams class, she was commissioned into the RAN in 1965. In March 1967, Hobart became the first RAN combat ship deployed to fight in the Vietnam War. This marked the start of consistent six-month deployments to the warzone, which continued until late 1971; Hobart was redeployed in 1969 and 1970. During the 1968 tour, the destroyer was attacked by a United States Air Force aircraft.

After the Vietnam War, Hobart saw service during Operation Navy Help Darwin; the RAN disaster relief effort following Cyclone Tracy, was the first RAN ship to dock at HMAS Stirling in Western Australia, and completed a round-the-world voyage in 1976. The ship was modernised during the late 1970s. Hobart was decommissioned in 2000, and sunk as a dive wreck off South Australia.

== Design and construction ==
Hobart was one of three Perth-class guided missile destroyers built for the RAN. Based on the United States Navy's Charles F. Adams class, Hobart had a displacement of 3,370 tons at standard load, and 4,618 tons at full load, a length of 440 feet 3 inches (134.19 m) overall and 420 feet (130 m) between perpendiculars, a beam of 47 feet 1 inch (14.35 m), and a maximum draught of 15 feet 3 inches (4.65 m). Propulsion was provided by two General Electric turbines, which provided 70,000 shaft horsepower (52,000 kW) to the destroyer's two propeller shafts. Hobart could achieve speeds of 35 knots (65 km/h; 40 mph). The ship's company consisted of 20 officers and 312 sailors.

As a guided missile destroyer, Hobart's main armament consisted of a Mark 13 missile launcher firing Tartar missiles and two Ikara anti-submarine missile launchers. This was supplemented by two 5"/54 caliber Mark 42 guns and two Mark 32 triple torpedo tube sets. Over the course of the ship's career, the Mark 13 launcher was modified to fire Standard missiles, the Ikara launchers were stripped out in 1989 and two Phalanx CIWS units were installed in 1991.

Hobart was laid down by the Defoe Shipbuilding Company at Bay City, Michigan on 26 October 1962. The ship was launched on 9 January 1964 by Alison Hay, the wife of David Hay, the Australian ambassador to the United Nations. Hobart was commissioned into the RAN on 18 December 1965. The cost of the destroyer was approximately A$45 million, including the initial load of supplies and ammunition. During construction, the ship was assigned the United States Navy hull number DDG-26. After commissioning, Hobart remained in American waters for eight months on trials and training exercises. Hobart left the US on 3 August 1966, and sailed via Hawaii and Fiji before reaching her namesake city on 1 September. The ship spent very little time in Australian waters before being deployed to fight in the Vietnam War in March 1967.

== Operational history ==
=== Vietnam deployments ===
During the mid-1960s, the United States government pressured Australia to increase the resources it was committing to the Vietnam War; one of the requests was for a combat vessel to help the USN meet the demand for naval gunfire support operations. The idea of deploying a RAN combat ship was initially hampered by the number of ships available, particularly with commitments to the Far East Strategic Reserve and involvement in the Indonesia-Malaysia Confrontation, along with the difficulty of operating and maintaining British-designed ships with USN resources. On 14 December 1966, the Australian Cabinet approved the deployment of Hobart as part of increases to Australian military commitment to the conflict. Destroyers deployed to the Vietnam theatre generally operated in one of four roles:

- Patrols along the coast of North Vietnam as part of Operation Sea Dragon to interdict coastal shipping, with secondary attacks on inland supply lines and military targets, along with coastal defence sites that had fired on American and Australian ships. Ships assigned to Sea Dragon were normally split into a northern and southern unit (although during 1967 up to four units were operating at any time), with each unit made up of two to three ships. However, the Australian government forbade RAN vessels from operating in the northern area.
- Naval gunfire support operations to assist ground forces, particularly the United States Marine Corps units operating closest to the Vietnamese Demilitarized Zone (DMZ). Seven ships were usually stationed on the 'gunline', and attacks fell into two categories: 'unspotted' shelling of areas where People's Army of Vietnam (PAVN) or Viet Cong (VC) forces and facilities were known or believed to be, and 'spotted' fire missions in direct support of ground troops. During these operations, Hobart operated under the callsign "Royal Purple".
- Anti-infiltration operations under Operation Market Time, which aimed to stop the logistic supply and reinforcement of VC units operating in South Vietnam by tracking, intercepting, and searching coastal shipping. RAN destroyers were never formally assigned to Market Time, but the overlap of the gunline and Market Time operational areas meant the ships were often called on to assist by tracking suspicious ships or participating in raids.
- Escort of USN aircraft carriers involved in Operation Rolling Thunder airstrikes.

Although RAN ships on deployment were expected to fulfil all duties of an equivalent American destroyer, they were forbidden by the Australian government from operating outside the Vietnam theatre on unrelated United States Seventh Fleet duties (such as the Taiwan Patrol Force, guard ship duties at Hong Kong, or the Space Recovery Program). After the invasion of Cambodia in 1970, RAN ships were also prohibited from entering Cambodian waters.

While deployed to Vietnam, the destroyers were placed under the administrative control of Commander Australian Forces Vietnam in addition to that of the Flag Officer Commanding Australian Fleet. Operationally, the RAN vessels were under the command of the Seventh Fleet. Arrangements were made to provide logistic support through the United States Pacific Fleet. A USN lieutenant was assigned to each ship during deployments to act as a liaison with the Seventh Fleet. The deployment of Hobart in March 1967 began a pattern of six-month deployments for RAN destroyers, with a constant RAN presence with the Seventh Fleet. Australia was the only allied nation to provide naval support to the United States Navy during the Vietnam War.

==== First deployment ====
On 15 March 1967, Hobart arrived at U.S. Naval Base Subic Bay to join the Seventh Fleet. After a comprehensive familiarisation period, Hobart replaced USS Fechteler on 31 March, taking over the US destroyer's gunfire support duties. By 04:45 the next morning, the Australian ship had already fired 100 rounds. On 3 April, the forward 5-inch gun mount became unserviceable, a state which remained for four-and-a-half-days. Hobart remained on the gunline until 15 April, during which she fired 1,651 shells. The ship was then rotated to Sea Dragon operations. The destroyer was fired on by shore batteries several times, and on one occasion took minor shrapnel damage. Several explosions in 5-inch/54 gun mounts during the later weeks of April saw all equipped destroyers (including Hobart) reassigned to other duties while investigations into the cause (believed to be a bad batch of ammunition) were explored. Hobart was attached to the carrier escort group for USS Kitty Hawk on 23 April. On 29 April, the destroyer sailed to Subic, underwent self-maintenance, then returned to Sea Dragon operations. Over the next week, Hobart and USS Allen M. Sumner cooperated on the interdiction of coastal shipping during a period of heavy activity; previous successes saw the North Vietnamese begin to increase retaliation with coastal artillery in an attempt to dissuade American operations. Apart from a brief stint on the gunline, Hobart remained assigned to Sea Dragon until 26 May, when sailed to Subic for maintenance, with both 5-inch gun barrels replaced.

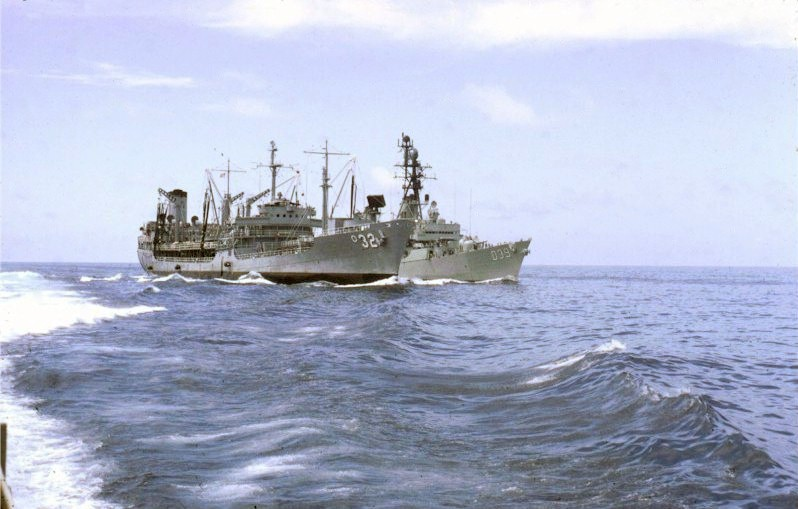
Hobart replenishing from USS Guadalupe during her first Vietnam War deployment

After delays caused by monsoonal conditions, the ship returned to the gunline on 18 June. During this period, the destroyer was also called on to escort the amphibious warfare ships involved in the Beacon Torch landings. After mid-June, the number of fire missions undertaken by Hobart dropped because of a need to conserve 5-inch/54 ammunition across the Seventh Fleet, and the fact that Marines in the area had successfully established their own artillery units in the area and were less reliant on naval gunfire. On 23 June, Hobart rotated to Sea Dragon. A reduction in the number of seaborne infiltration attempts and the increasing availability of spotter aircraft meant that most gunfire missions were against inland targets like truck convoys. On 10 July, the destroyer left the operational area and sailed to Subic via Hong Kong, and underwent self-maintenance. This was completed on 24 July, and Hobart sailed for the operational area. The ship was double tasked to the USS Forrestal escort group and Sea Dragon operations; three destroyers were required to escort the carrier at any time, with any additional ships operating on Sea Dragon duties. On 29 July, a fire aboard the carrier necessitated the carrier's removal from the operational area; Hobart was one of the ships assigned to escort and assist with casualties. The ship returned to Sea Dragon operations on 31 July. This continued until 16 August, and after maintenance at Subic, Hobart was attached to the gunline on 6 September. On 14 September, Hobart arrived in Subic, handed over responsibility to HMAS Perth, and sailed for home.

During this deployment, Hobart fired over 10,000 rounds at 1,050 targets during 160 days at sea, and was fired on ten times, with no casualties. Hobart was awarded the United States Navy Unit Commendation for this tour of duty. Personnel awards included a Distinguished Service Order, a British Empire Medal, a Mention in Despatches and 25 Naval Board commendations.

==== Second deployment ====
Hobart was deployed to Vietnam for the second time in 1968, relieving Perth on 31 March. On 13 April, the destroyer arrived on the gunline to relieve USS Henry B. Wilson. Five days later, she began Sea Dragon operations with USS Collett. The ships were unsuccessfully shelled by coastal artillery on 22 and 23 April, then spent the next three days attempting to attract attention from shore batteries so they could be bombed by aircraft. Hobart's participation in Sea Dragon ended in late April, and after maintenance in Hong Kong and Taiwan from 1 to 20 May, resumed gunline duties. This continued until 2 June, when the destroyer's guns required new barrels. On 11 June, the destroyer returned to the Sea Dragon area of operations, joining USS Theodore E. Chandler. During this deployment, boat traffic between the mainland and Tiger Island was seen as a priority, with gunline ships also granted approval to operate against targets in this area. Early in the month, problems with the 5-inch/54 guns aboard Hobart and several US destroyers appeared; Hobart's captain decided to only fire the guns in emergencies until the problem was clearly identified. The destroyer USS Edson joined Hobart and Chandler to make up for the lack of firepower.

During the evening of 16–17 June, the three destroyers were ordered to undertake surveillance missions around Tiger Island, because of reports of North Vietnamese helicopter activity in the area. At 03:09, Hobart's radar picked up an aircraft approaching with no IFF transponder active. At 03:14, the aircraft fired a single missile at the ship, which killed one sailor, wounded two others and damaged the chief petty officer's mess, air search radar and missile control compartments and the ship's funnels. Two minutes later, the aircraft made a second pass and fired two missiles. The missiles hit simultaneously: one penetrated the superstructure and damaged the gunners' store, engineers workshop and aft seamans' mess, while the other hit close to the original missile, causing further damage to the mess and missile control room, while also damaging the Tartar checkout room, killing another sailor and wounded six others. There was also major damage around the destroyer's Ikara magazine, but as Hobart was not carrying any Ikara missiles at the time, the potential magazine fire did not occur. The aircraft came around for a third attack run, but was scared off when Hobart's forward gun turret, under independent control, fired five rounds at the aircraft. At 03:30, Edson reported coming under fire, and Hobart's captain ordered the three destroyers to take up anti-aircraft formation. At 05:15, the three destroyers linked up with the cruiser USS Boston (which had been hit by a missile from another aircraft) and the escorting destroyer USS Blandy, and continued anti-aircraft manoeuvring. After being relieved, Hobart sailed for Subic Bay, where the damage was inspected by RAN and USN personnel, including three admirals. Debris collected from Hobart and the other ships indicated that the missiles were of United States Air Force (USAF) origin.

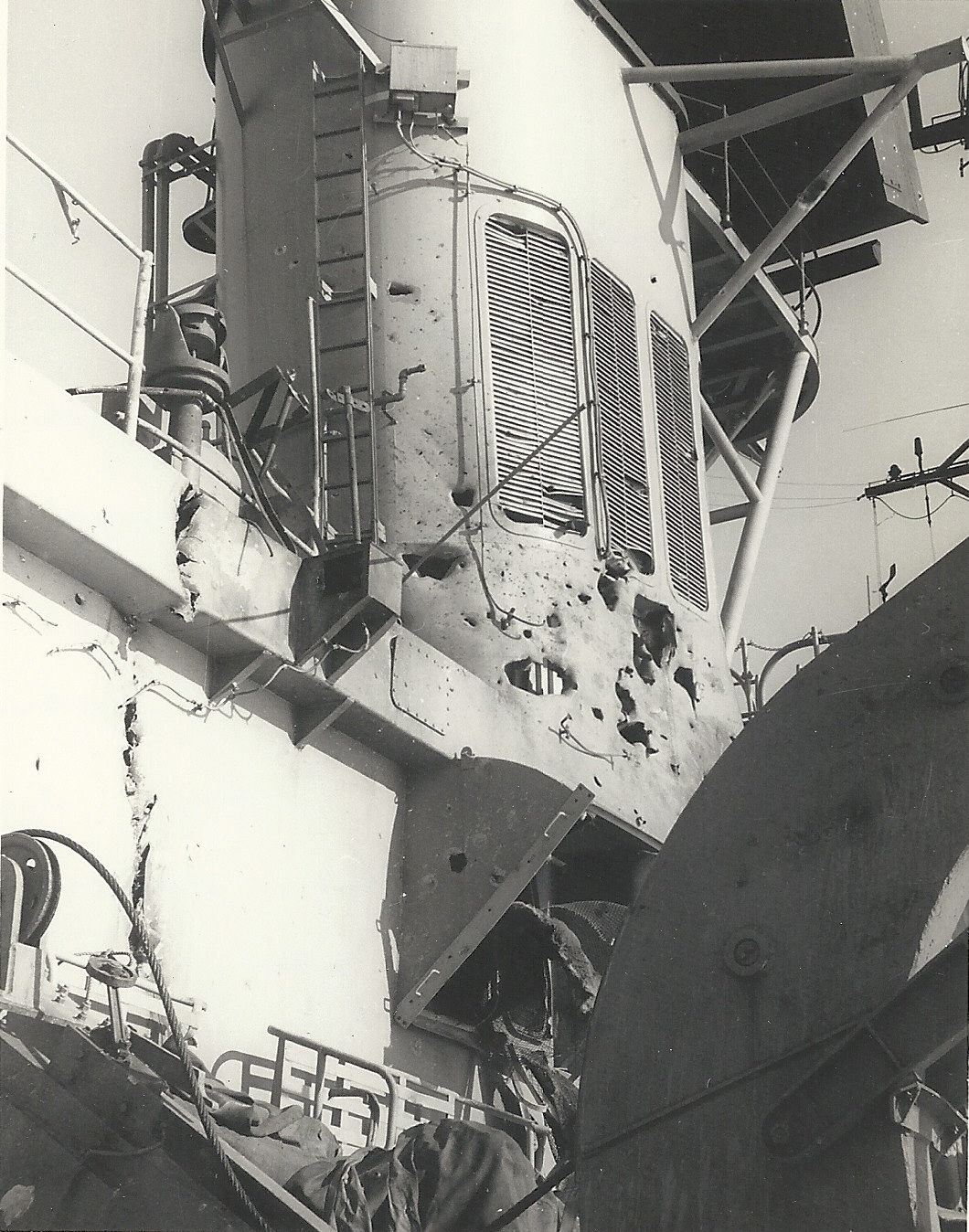
Damage to Hobart from the USAF missile

The attacks on Hobart and the other ships were the capstone of a series of firing incidents between 15 and 17 June, and an inquiry was held by the USN into the incidents, with three RAN personnel attending as technical advisors. The inquiry found that a few hours before the attack on Hobart, Patrol Craft Fasts PCF-12 and PCF-19, along with USCGC Point Dume, were attacked by what they identified at the time as hovering enemy aircraft, but were believed to be friendly planes; PCF-19 was sunk in the attack. F-4 Phantoms of the USAF Seventh Air Force, responding several hours after the attack on the PCFs, were unable to distinguish between the radar signature of surface ships and airborne helicopters and instead opened fire on Hobart, Boston, and Edson. Hobart underwent repairs in Subic Bay, and returned to duty on the gunline on 25 July.

During the evening of 27 July, Hobart was involved in another friendly fire incident; this time, shells from the ship fell close to a Marine unit's command post and injured three Marines. The fault was found to be with the Marine unit's spotter, who was inexperienced, failed to signal the close proximity of friendly units to the target, and failed to fully identify the target before calling for five rounds of shellfire. Although Hobart was asked to rotate Sea Dragon duties on 2 August to relieve a destroyer experiencing gunnery faults, nine days early, the destroyer's captain refused, as he wanted more time to prepare the ship after the repairs, particularly as the air warning radars were yet to become operational, and the gun mounts were experiencing minor problems. The Sea Dragon deployment did not eventuate, and after operating near the DMZ, Hobart was reassigned to gunfire support duties around southern Vietnam on 12 August. On 22 August, the destroyer fired to support the 1st Australian Task Force in Phuoc Tuy Province: the first time a RAN destroyer provided naval gunfire support for Australian soldiers in the war. On 29 September, Perth relieved Hobart at Subic, and Hobart sailed for home. One sailor was awarded a Distinguished Service Medal for his actions during the 17 June attack (the government received advice that as it was a friendly fire incident, a non-combat medal like the British Empire Medal should be awarded instead, but this was ignored), while two Mentions in Despatches and 23 Naval Board commendations were also issued.

==== Third deployment ====
Hobart returned to Vietnam for her third tour on 28 March 1970, taking over from the Daring-class destroyer HMAS Vendetta. After working up, the destroyer relieved USS Ernest G. Small from gunline duties on 6 April. On 21 April, the ship moved north to near the DMZ. Three days later, the destroyer rammed and sank a South Vietnamese fishing craft, but rescued the five crew and transported them to shore. At the end of April, the ship sailed to Subic for maintenance. After this was completed, Hobart returned to gunline duties on 11 May, and remained on station until 24 May, when the destroyer sailed to Singapore for maintenance. Hobart resumed gunline operations on 6 June; these continued until 28 June, when she sailed to Subic for rebarrelling. The ship returned to the gunline on 9 July, and operated until 29 August, when she sailed to Singapore for maintenance, then Bangkok for naval exercises. Returning on 13 September, Hobart was called to relieve USS Lloyd Thomas on the gunline after an explosion in one of the American destroyer's gun mounts. On 22 September, Hobart sailed to Subic. The destroyer was relieved by Perth on 26 September. Two personnel were mentioned in despatches, and 23 Naval Board commendations were issued for the deployment.

During 1971, the Australian government decided to withdraw all forces from Vietnam by the end of the year. Hobart made no further deployments to Vietnam, and after HMAS Brisbane completed her assigned operations in September 1971, no further RAN ships were deployed to the warzone for combat operations. Hobart received the battle honour "Vietnam 1967–70" for her wartime service, adding to the eight honours inherited from the previous ship of the name.

=== 1970s–1980s ===
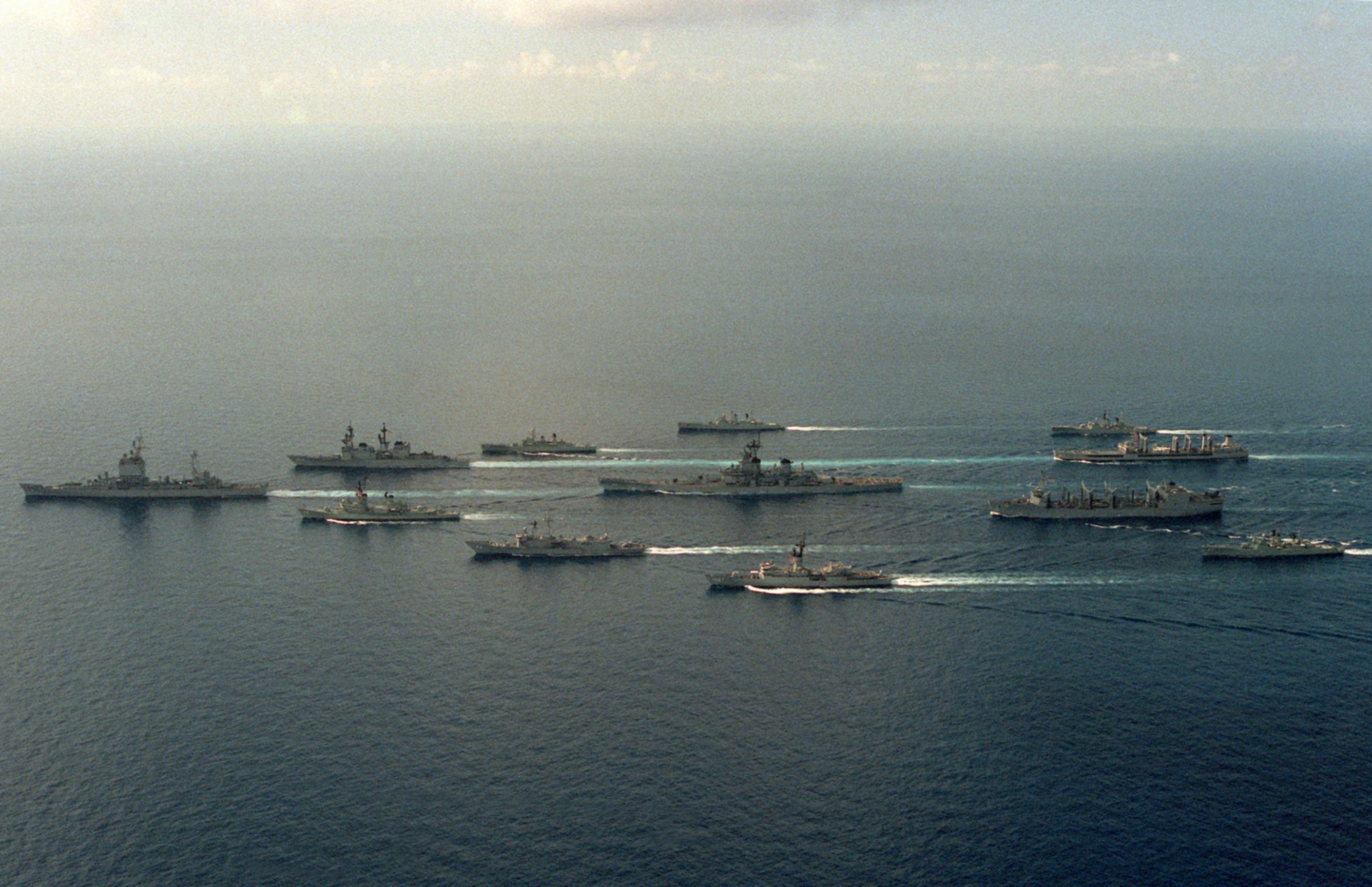
Hobart (second row from left, bottom) cruises as part of a joint US-Australian battle group around the US Navy battleship USS New Jersey

In 1972, Hobart underwent modernisation in the US. In June 1974, the destroyer was involved in the Exercise Kangaroo One. On 15 October, Hobart departed from Sydney with HMAS Supply for a five-week tour of Australian and New Zealand ports. While in her namesake city, Hobart was visited by Charles, Prince of Wales; the first time the royal had boarded an Australian warship.

On 27 December 1974, Hobart sailed from Sydney as one of thirteen RAN ships involved in Operation Navy Help Darwin; the RAN disaster relief effort following the destruction of Darwin by Cyclone Tracy on 24–25 December 1974. Later in the year, the destroyer participated in the multinational exercise RIMPAC 75, then embarked on a three-month deployment in the Indian Ocean, during which Hobart became the first RAN ship to visit Malé in the Maldives, and the first warship to dock at HMAS Stirling, the new naval base in Western Australia. Between May and September 1976, Hobart sailed on a round-the-world voyage; the 109-day deployment was named Exercise Phineas Fogg after the main character from Around the World in Eighty Days. During this voyage, the ship visited nineteen ports in twelve countries, and represented Australia at the fleet review off New York City commemorating the United States Bicentennial.

During 1977 and 1978, Hobart underwent a half-life modernisation, during which the propulsion system was converted from furnace oil to diesel fuel, and a Naval Combat Data System was installed. In July 1979, Hobart and the Antarctic Support Vessel Thala Dan were sent to Macquarie Island to retrieve a badly injured researcher and return him to Australia. In order to transfer the researcher to the ship, Hobart's personnel constructed a makeshift helipad, which was used by Thala Dan's helicopter to deliver the injured man to the destroyer. Hobart remained in Australian waters during the early 1980s, with the exception of deployments to Hawaii for RIMPAC, to the North West Indian Ocean for 6 months in 1981 and participation in Kangaroo exercises. The destroyer underwent refit in 1984. In 1985, Hobart sailed to Canada to represent Australia at a naval review recognising the 75th anniversary of the Royal Canadian Navy's founding. During 1986, the ship was deployed to South-east Asia, which was repeated in 1987. During early 1988, the destroyer participated in activities celebrating Australia's Bicentenary, then later in the year sailed to join the RIMPAC exercise. In 1989, the destroyer's Ikara launchers were removed during a refit.

=== 1990s–2000 ===
Hobart visited New Zealand in 1991 to celebrate the 50th anniversary of the Royal New Zealand Navy. During 1992, the destroyer participated in RIMPAC. In 1993, Hobart visited South-east Asia, then participated in the first Exercise Kakadu. The ship returned to Hawaii for RIMPAC 94, and was assigned command of one of the exercise task groups. In 1995, the ship was again deployed to South-east Asia, participated in celebrations of the 50th anniversary of the Pacific War's end, and visited New Zealand. Hobart won the Gloucester Cup for 1995, a trophy awarded to the most efficient ship of the RAN during a calendar year; this was the eighth time the Cup was won by the destroyer. The ship was docked for refit for most of 1996, with post-refit trials extending into 1997.

During early 1998, Hobart was deployed to exercises in New Zealand, then sailed to Queensland in May. From August until December, the ship, accompanied by Adelaide, Brisbane, and Sydney, visited ports in Indonesia and South-east Asia. Hobart spent most of 1999 either alongside in Sydney, or on exercises in Jervis Bay.

== Decommissioning and fate ==
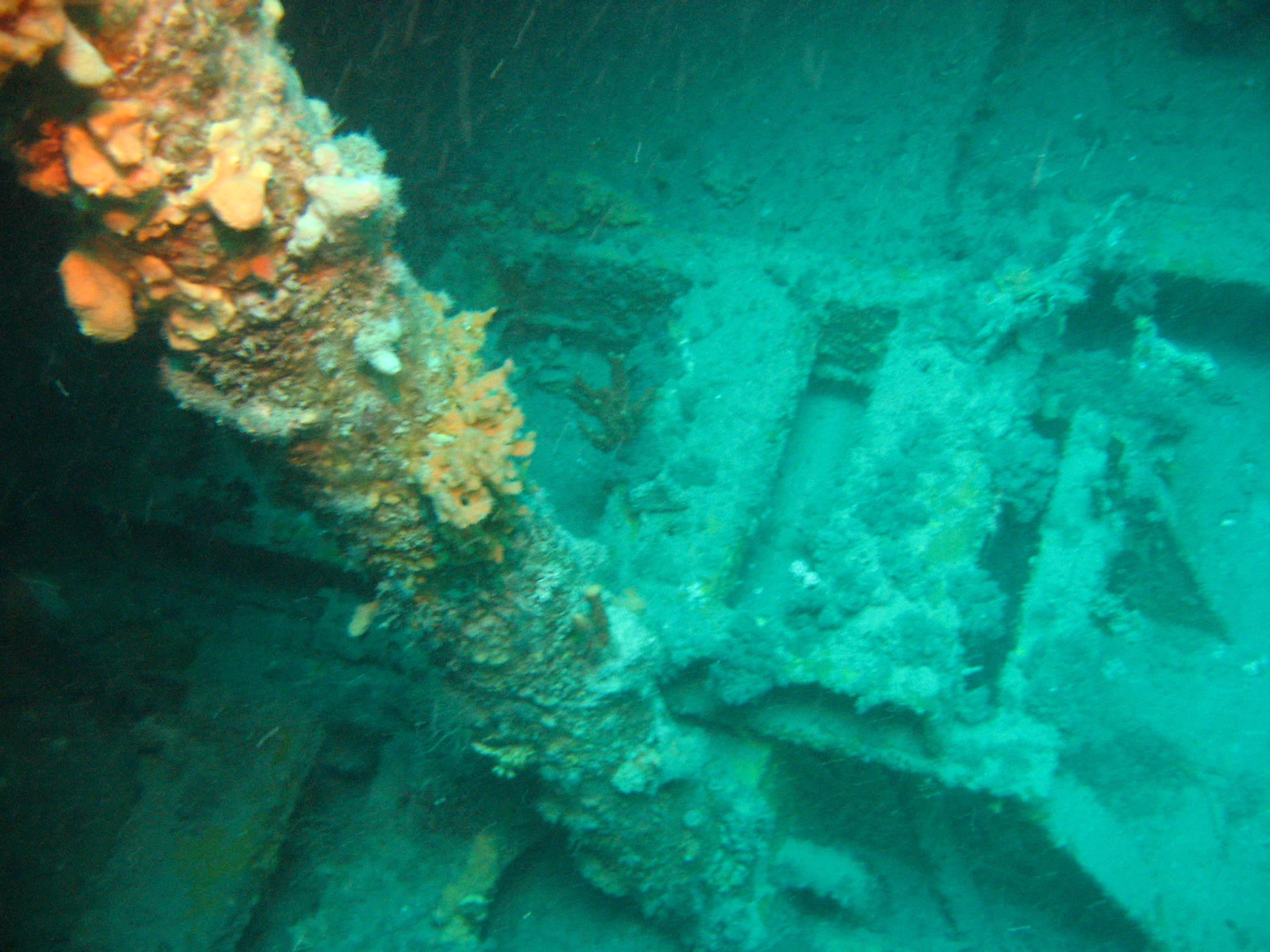
Hobart's galley in 2010

Hobart paid off on 12 May 2000. She was given to the South Australian Government by the federal Department of Defence in August 2000.

Prior to the scuttling, preparatory work was done to ensure safe diving and minimal environmental impact, based on international best practices and mostly undertaken at Port Adelaide by contracted labour and some volunteers. Oil and other contaminants were removed. The goal was to maintain the vessel's character as a fighting ship, but in the interests of safety, some entrances were sealed, some doors, hatches and sharp and protruding objects were removed, and corridors and openings widened. All furniture and equipment obstructing access or not secured was removed.

The ship was sunk as a dive wreck on 5 November 2002 in Yankalilla Bay, South Australia at 35°28′51.6″S 138°09′26.0″E, 4.8 nautical miles (8.9 km) west-north-west of Marina St. Vincent, within the Encounter Marine Park. The wreck site is officially known as the Fleurieu Artificial Reef. The scuttled ship is scheduled as a historic shipwreck as per the South Australian Historic Shipwrecks Act 1981 and has a protected zone of 550-metre (1,800 ft) radius which prohibits boating activity unless the operator has a permit.

The HMAS Hobart Memorial Lookout is located north of Wirrina Cove, at Little Gorge, on the road to Normanville.

== See also ==
- Non-U.S. recipients of U.S. gallantry awards
- Ship's graveyard
