= HMS Swan =

Twenty ships of the Royal Navy have borne the name HMS Swan, or the archaic HMS Swann, probably after the bird, the Swan:

- English ship Swann (1417) was a balinger acquired 1417 and sold 1423.
- English ship Swann (1572) was a vessel sailing with Sir Francis Drake in 1572.
- English ship Swann (1577) was a flyboat sailing with Drake in 1577. She was lost in 1578.
- English ship Swann (1632) was a 'frigat' listed in service between 1632 and 1633.
- English ship Swan (1641) was a ship launched in 1641 and wrecked in 1653.
- HMS Swann (1652) was a 22-gun ship captured in 1652 and sold in 1654.
- HMS Swann (1665) was a 6-gun flyboat captured from the Dutch in 1665 and sold in 1666.
- HMS Swann (1666) was a smack launched in 1666 and captured by the Dutch in 1673.
- HMS Swann (1667) was a 2-gun fireship purchased in 1667 and expended that year.
- HMS Swann (1673) was a 32-gun fifth rate captured from the Dutch in 1673. She was converted into a 10-gun fireship between 1688 and 1689 and was wrecked in the 1692 Jamaica earthquake.
- HMS Swann (1684) was a sixth rate captured from the Algerians in 1684 and sold that year.
- HMS Swann (1694) was a 24-gun sixth rate launched in 1694. She foundered in 1707.
- HMS Swann (1709) was a 12-gun sixth rate launched in 1709 and sold in 1713.
- HMS Swan (1745) was a 14-gun sloop launched in 1745 and sold in 1763.
- HMS Swan (1767) was a 14-gun sloop launched in 1767. She bore the name HMS Explosion between 1779 and 1783 whilst being used as a fireship. She was sold in 1814. Between 1815 and 1840 she made 23 annual voyages as a whaler in the Northern Whale Fishery. She also made one voyage as a whaler in the Southern Whale Fishery.
- HMS Swan (1782) was an 18-gun sloop, previously purchased from civilian service in 1781 and named HMS Bonetta. She was renamed HMS Swan in 1782, but capsized later that year.
- HMS Swan (1788) was a 10-gun cutter purchased in 1788 for the Revenue Service, assigned to Royal Naval service in 1790 and wrecked in 1792. What happened in 1788 was that the contract system for Revenue cutters was abolished and the Collector of Customs Cowes was relieved of personal financial responsibility for upkeep of the vessel (Swan II), this responsibility was assumed by the Board of Customs.
- HMS Swan (1792) was a 10-gun cutter purchased in 1792 for the Revenue Service, assigned for Royal Naval service in 1795 and captured that year by the French. The vessel (Swan III) was not transferred out of the Revenue Service; when captured it was on temporary secondment to the Admiralty and running despatches during the Quiberon landings. In October 1810, HMS Owen Glendower captured the French privateer cutter Indomptable, of 16 guns and 130 men, and sent her into Plymouth. The privateer was described as the former revenue cutter Swan, of Cowes. The Indomptable was more likely to be the Swan V (built 1798, captured in 1807) rather than Swan III.
- HMS Swan (1811) was a 10-gun Nimble-class cutter launched in 1811 at Cowes. She had an unexceptional wartime career. After the war she served in fishery protection, and half of her entire career as a floating chapel for seamen. She was broken up in 1874.
- HMS Swan (1856) was an Albacore-class wooden screw gunboat launched in 1856, used as a coal hulk from 1869 and sold in 1906.

== See also ==
- His Majesty's Hired armed cutter Swan
- HMAS Swan
- HMCS Swansea (K328)
- HMS Black Swan (L57)
- HMS Swanston
- HMS Wild Swan
