= Normanville =

Normanville may refer to:

== Places ==
- Normanville, Eure, in the Eure département, Normandy, France
- Normanville, Seine-Maritime, in the Seine-Maritime département, Normandy, France
- Normanville, a hamlet of Le Mesnil-Lieubray in the Seine-Maritime département, France
- Normanville, South Australia, a town and locality in Australia

== People ==
- Edgar de Normanville (1882-1968) British inventor, engineer and technical journalist
- Eustace de Normanville, an English medieval university chancellor
