= HMAS Hobart (DDG 39) =

2017 Hobart-class destroyer of the Royal Australian Navy

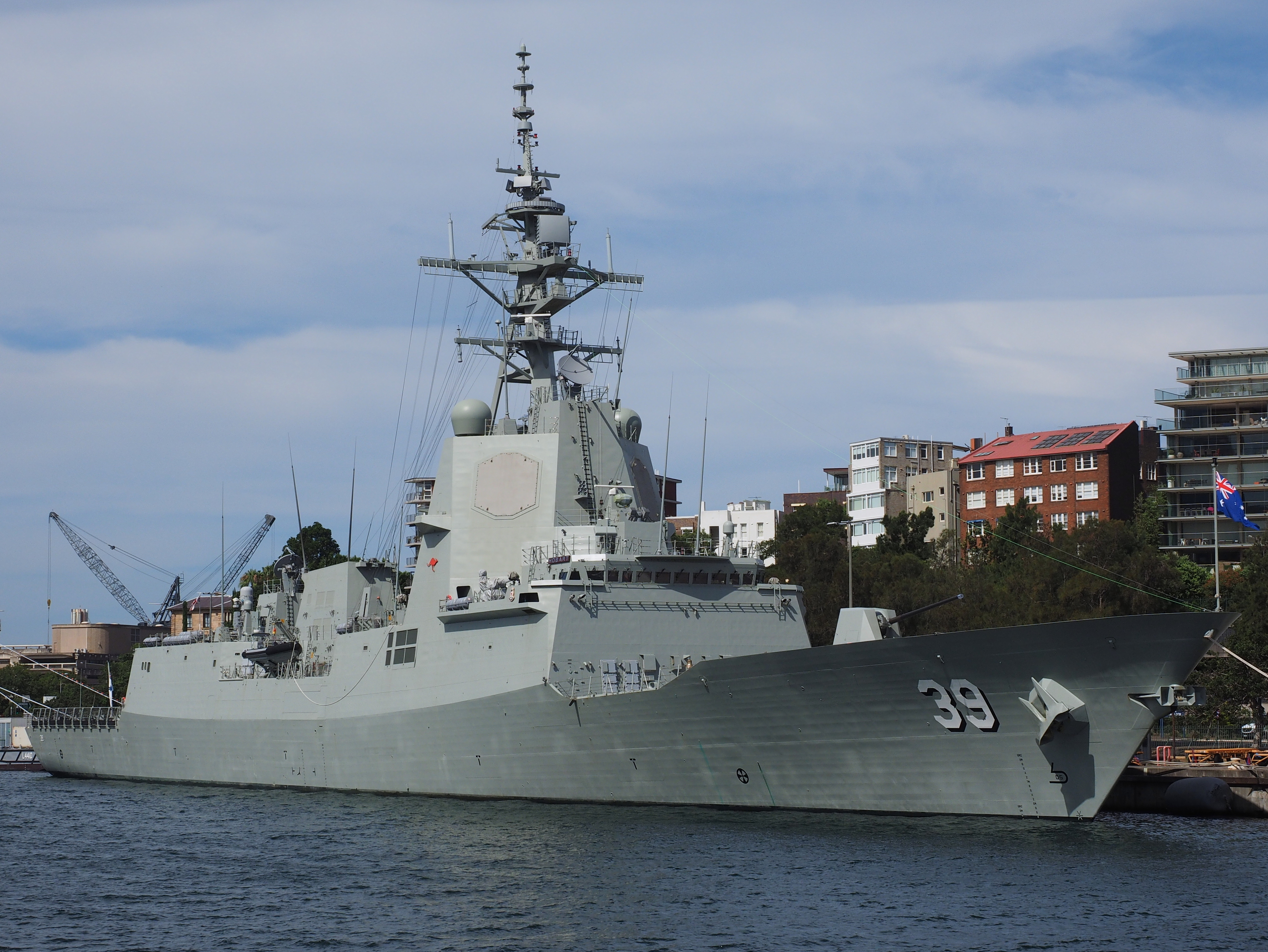
- HMAS Hobart in December 2017

History

Australia
- Namesake: City of Hobart, Tasmania
- Ordered: 4 October 2007
- Builder: Navantia (designer); AWD Alliance (project coordinator); ASC (primary shipbuilder); Forgacs Marine & Defence and BAE Systems Australia (module builders), Osborne Naval Shipyard
- Laid down: 6 September 2012
- Launched: 23 May 2015
- Acquired: 16 June 2017
- Commissioned: 23 September 2017
- Home port: Fleet Base East, Sydney
- Identification: MMSI number: 503617000
- Motto: Grow with Strength
- Honours and awards: Nine inherited battle honours
- Status: Active as of 2021
- Badge

General characteristics (as designed)
- Class & type: Hobart-class destroyer
- Type: Air warfare/Guided missile destroyer
- Displacement: 7,000 tonnes (6,900 long tons; 7,700 short tons) full load
- Length: 147.2 metres (483 ft)
- Beam: 18.6 metres (61 ft) maximum
- Draught: 5.17 metres (17.0 ft)
- Propulsion: Combined diesel or gas (CODOG) arrangement; 2 × General Electric Marine model 7LM2500-SA-MLG38 gas turbines, 17,500 kilowatts (23,500 hp) each; 2 × Caterpillar 3616 diesel engines, 5,650 kilowatts (7,580 hp) each; 2 × controllable pitch propellers
- Speed: Over 28 knots (52 km/h; 32 mph)
- Range: Over 5,000 nautical miles (9,300 km; 5,800 mi) at 18 knots (33 km/h; 21 mph)
- Complement: 186 + 16 aircrew; Accommodation for 234
- Sensors & processing systems: Aegis combat system; Lockheed Martin AN/SPY-1D(V) S-band radar; Northrop Grumman AN/SPQ-9B X-band pulse Doppler horizon search radar; Raytheon Mark 99 fire-control system with two AN/SPG-62 fire-control radars; 2 × L-3 Communications SAM Electronics X-band navigation radars; Ultra Electronics Sonar Systems' Integrated Sonar System; Ultra Electronics Series 2500 electro-optical director; Sagem VAMPIR IR search and track system; Rafael Toplite stabilised target acquisition sights
- Electronic warfare & decoys: ITT EDO Reconnaissance and Surveillance Systems ES-3701 ESM radar; SwRI MBS-567A communications ESM system; Ultra Electronics Avalon Systems multi-purpose digital receiver; Jenkins Engineering Defence Systems low-band receiver; 4 × Nulka decoy launchers; 4 × 6-tube multi-purpose decoy launchers
- Armament: Missiles: 48-cell Mark 41 Vertical Launch System firing: RIM-66 Standard 2 missile; RIM-162 Evolved Sea Sparrow missile; 2 × 4-canister Harpoon missile launchers; Torpedoes: 2 × 2-tube Mark 32 Mod 9 torpedo launchers firing MU90 Impact torpedoes; Guns: 1 × 5"/64 calibre Mark 45 mod 4 main gun; 2 × 25mm M242 Bushmaster Mk 38 mod 2 Typhoon RWS; 1 × 20mm Phalanx CIWS
- Aircraft carried: 1 x MH-60R Seahawk

HMAS Hobart (DDG 39), named after the city of Hobart, Tasmania, is the lead ship of the Hobart-class air warfare destroyers used by the Royal Australian Navy (RAN). The ship, based on the Álvaro de Bazán-class frigate designed by Navantia, was built at ASC's shipyard in Osborne, South Australia from modules fabricated by ASC, BAE Systems Australia in Victoria, and Forgacs Marine & Defence in New South Wales. Hobart was ordered in 2007, but errors and delays in construction caused extensive schedule slippage. Despite commissioning initially planned for December 2014, the ship was not laid down until September 2012, and launched in May 2015. The Department of Defence accepted delivery of HMAS Hobart on 16 June 2017. The ship was commissioned on 23 September 2017.

== Construction ==
The ship was assembled from 31 pre-fabricated modules ('blocks'): 12 for the hull, nine for the forward superstructure, and 10 for the aft superstructure. Modules were fabricated by ASC in South Australia, BAE Systems Australia in Victoria, and Forgacs Marine & Defence in New South Wales, with final assembly of the ship at ASC's shipyard in Osborne, South Australia. Delays and project slippage resulted in the redistribution of block construction across the three shipbuilders, and the bow hull block was constructed by Navantia.

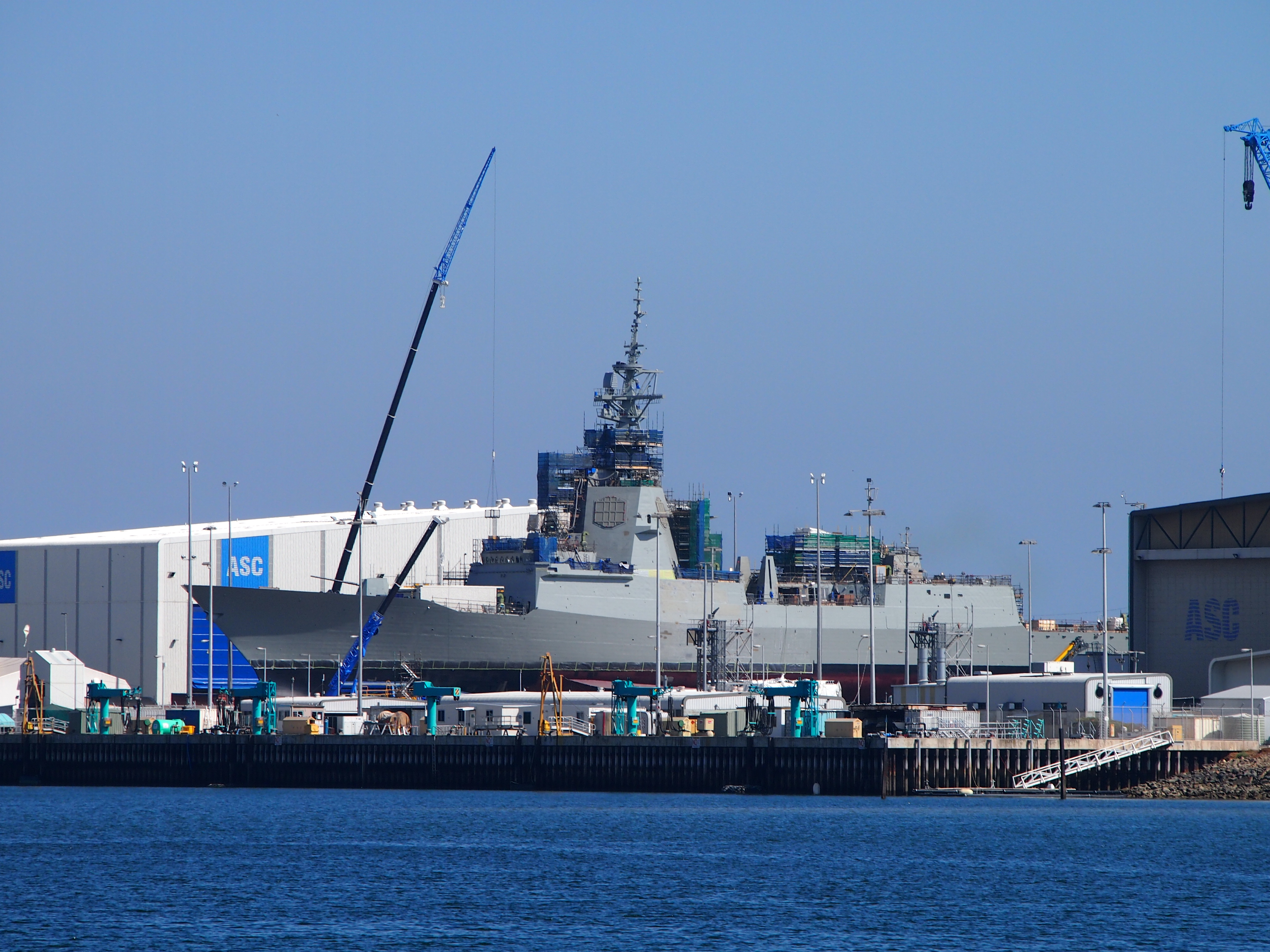
Hobart under construction in April 2015

In October 2010, the 20-by-17-metre (66 by 56 ft) central keel block for Hobart was found to be distorted and incompatible with other hull sections. Incorrect drawings from designer Navantia and first-of-kind manufacturing errors by manufacturer BAE were blamed, and the delay in reworking the block set construction back at least six months. Other major issues during construction included the need to replace 25% of the destroyer's internal pipework due to faulty manufacture, and the initial rejection of the ship's mainmast block because of defects in the cabling and combat system equipment.

Hobart's keel was laid down on 6 September 2012. The ship was launched on 27 May 2015, with 76% of construction complete. Construction of Hobart and her sister ships saw numerous delays: a planned December 2014 commissioning for Hobart was pushed back in September 2012 to March 2016, then again in May 2015 to delivery in June 2017. As of October 2015, construction of Hobart was estimated to be 30 months behind schedule and $870 million over budget. Sea trials were completed in September 2016. Hobart was handed over to the Navy in June 2017, and was commissioned on 23 September 2017 with the designation Guided missile destroyer 'DDG' and assigned the pennant number '39'.

== Operational service ==
Hobart conducted a five-month deployment to the United States during late 2018 which was undertaken to test her combat systems. During the deployment the ship completed a range of intensive trials, and fired multiple missiles.

Hobart commenced her first operational deployment in late September 2019. During this deployment she served as the flagship for a RAN task group in Northern and South-East Asia. Hobart was one of the Australian ships which participated in the RIMPAC 2020 exercise in mid-2020. This was undertaken as part of a broader deployment by the ships to South-East Asia and the Pacific.

Hobart visited her namesake city for the 183rd Royal Hobart Regatta in February 2018, which was the first time in 18 years a vessel bearing its name had done so. She returned again for the next regatta in 2022. On 9 March 2024 Hobart's crew marched in a Freedom of Entry parade through the Hobart central business district.

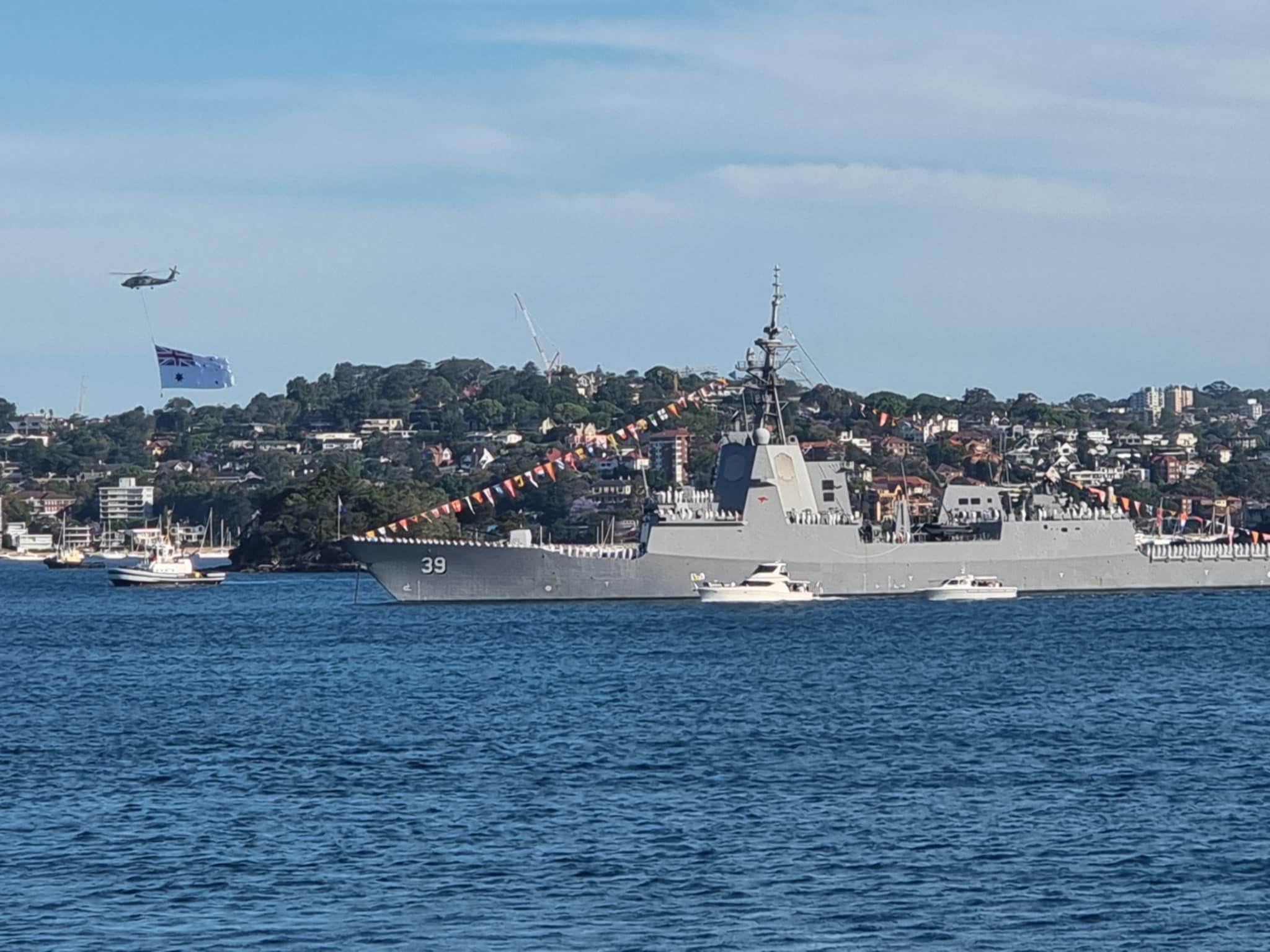
MV Admiral Hudson carrying King Charles III passes HMAS Hobart during the 2024 Royal Fleet Review on Sydney Harbour
