= Typhoon Agnes (1981) =

Pacific typhoon in 1981

Typhoon Agnes (Pining)
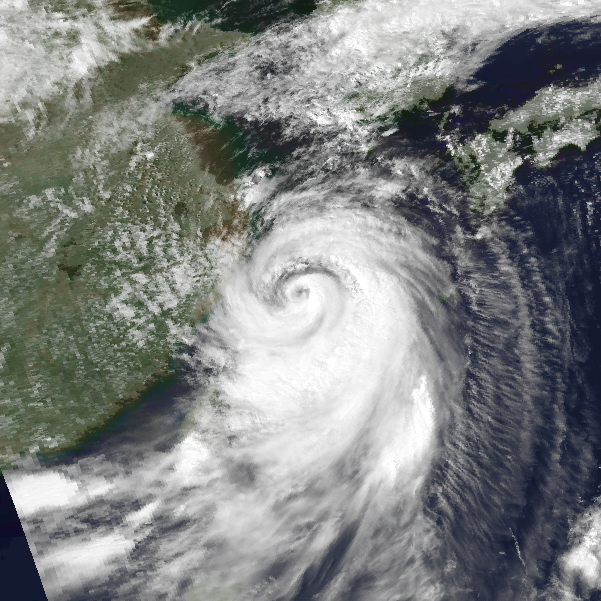
- Typhoon Agnes near peak intensity on August 31

Meteorological history
- Formed: August 25, 1981
- Extratropical: September 3, 1981
- Dissipated: September 6, 1981

Typhoon
- 10-minute sustained (JMA)
- Highest winds: 150 km/h (90 mph)
- Lowest pressure: 950 hPa (mbar); 28.05 inHg

Category 2-equivalent typhoon
- 1-minute sustained (SSHWS/JTWC)
- Highest winds: 175 km/h (110 mph)
- Lowest pressure: 947 hPa (mbar); 27.96 inHg

Overall effects
- Casualties: 159 (killed or missing)
- Damage: ≥$135 million (1981 USD)
- Areas affected: Japan; Taiwan; East China; South Korea
- IBTrACS
- Part of the 1981 Pacific typhoon season

Typhoon Agnes, known in the Philippines as Typhoon Pining, produced among the heaviest rains recorded during the 20th century in South Korea, with 710 mm (28 in) falling over a two-day span. The storm originated as a tropical depression near Guam on August 25, 1981. Moving along a west-northwest to northwest track, the system gradually strengthened as deep convection organized around it. The depression was assigned the name Agnes on August 27 following the development of gale-force winds. Further intensification to typhoon-status occurred by August 29. Agnes attained its peak intensity on August 31 over the East China Sea as a Category 2-equivalent on the Saffir–Simpson hurricane wind scale with winds of 175 km/h (109 mph). (Note: All winds are one-minute sustained unless otherwise noted.) Subsequent interaction with a mid-latitude trough induced an extratropical transition as the cyclone slowed and turned north. The system had lost most of its tropical characteristics by September 1, with the majority of convection sheared northeast over South Korea and Japan. Agnes later accelerated northeast and completed its transition on September 3. The remnants continued along this course, impacting northern Japan and the Kamchatka Peninsula before last being noted on September 6 near the International Date Line.

Throughout the course of Agnes's existence, several countries were affected by torrential rains and typhoon-force winds. Hardest hit was South Korea where record-breaking rains triggered widespread flooding. More than 12,000 structures were damaged or destroyed by the storm and 191,000 acres (77,000 hectares) of farmland was inundated. A total of 113 people died in the country while damage reached $134 million. Taiwan saw similarly destructive rains which left 32 people dead or missing. A further 14 people died in mainland China where coastal flooding from the typhoon's slow movement coincided with the spring tide, resulting in the greatest storm surge since 1949 along the Yangtze estuary and Hangzhou Bay. Much of Japan saw rains from the storm, though no significant damage or loss of life took place in the country.

== Meteorological history ==
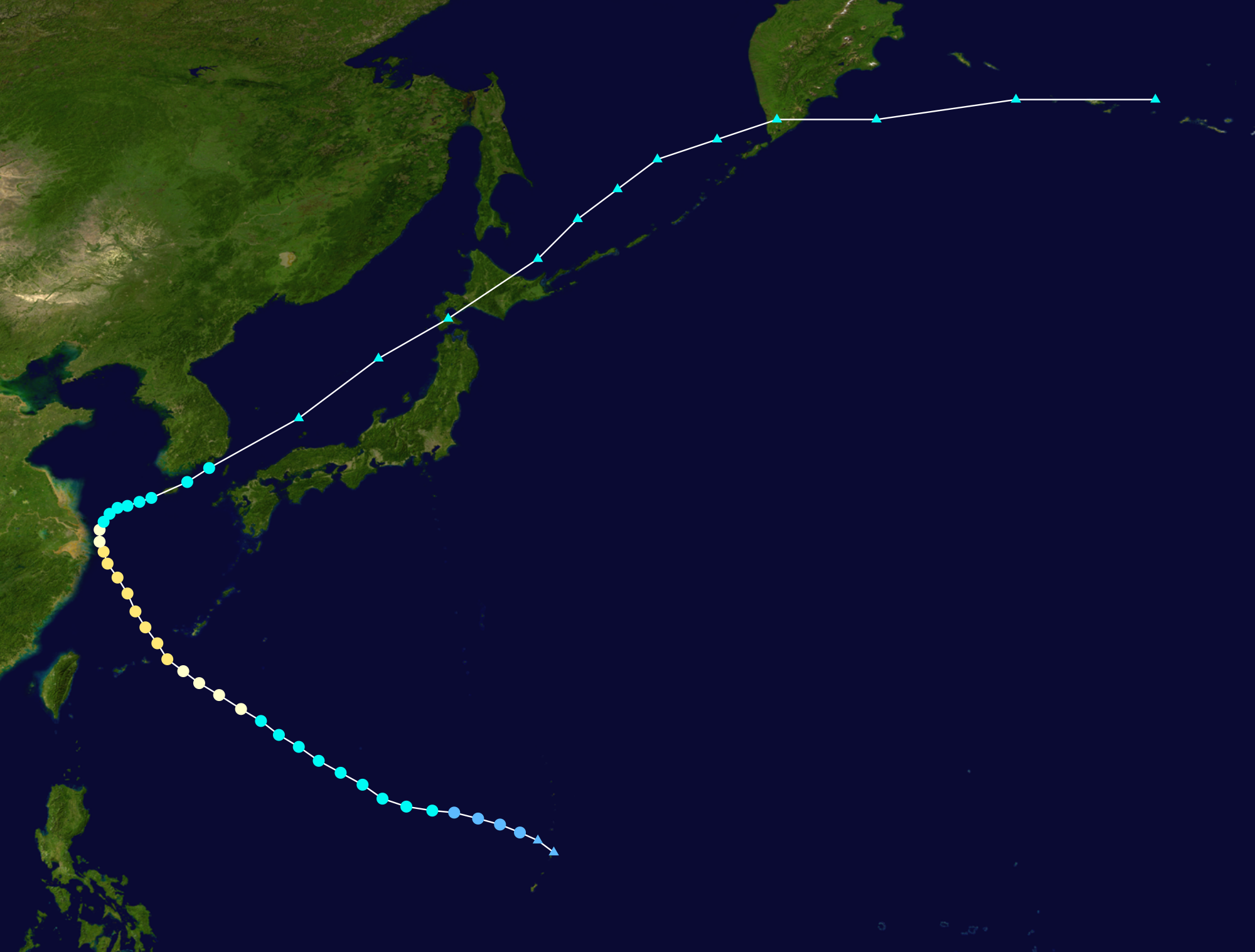
Map plotting the storm's track and intensity, according to the Saffir–Simpson scale Map key Saffir–Simpson scale Tropical depression (≤38 mph, ≤62 km/h) Tropical storm (39–73 mph, 63–118 km/h) Category 1 (74–95 mph, 119–153 km/h) Category 2 (96–110 mph, 154–177 km/h) Category 3 (111–129 mph, 178–208 km/h) Category 4 (130–156 mph, 209–251 km/h) Category 5 (≥157 mph, ≥252 km/h) Unknown Storm type Tropical cyclone Subtropical cyclone Extratropical cyclone, remnant low, tropical disturbance, or monsoon depression

On August 23, 1981, following several days of tranquil weather, a tropical upper tropospheric trough (TUTT) began building westward from the International Date Line, near Wake Island. Over the following 36 hours, an expansive area of convection developed southwest of the organizing TUTT. On August 25, surface observations on Guam in the Mariana Islands indicated the presence of a low-pressure system. Coinciding with this, the Japan Meteorological Agency (JMA) declared the formation of a tropical depression at 06:00 UTC. Weather reconnaissance missions throughout the day indicated a 1006 mbar (hPa; 29.71 inHg) center west of Guam, prompting the Joint Typhoon Warning Center (JTWC) to issue a Tropical Cyclone Formation Alert. Following improvement in the convective structure, the JTWC began warning on the cyclone as Tropical Depression 18W at 18:00 UTC, at which time the depression was situated roughly 665 km (413 mi) west-northwest of Guam.

Tracking west-northwest and later northwest around the southwestern edge of a subtropical ridge, steady intensification of the cyclone ensued. Early on August 27, a reconnaissance plane measured a central pressure of 994 mbar (994 hPa; 29.4 inHg) and flight-level winds of 85 km/h (53 mph), indicating the system had become a tropical storm. (Note: The flight-level winds were measured at an altitude of 460 m (1,500 ft).) In light of this, the JTWC assigned the name Agnes to the storm. (Note: The Japan Meteorological Agency also referred to the system as Agnes, though maintains it as Typhoon 8118 in their official database.) Additionally due to its proximity to the Philippines, the Philippine Atmospheric, Geophysical and Astronomical Services Administration dubbed the system with the local name Pining. Strengthening occurred at a climatological rate, with Agnes attaining typhoon-status on August 29. A large, banding eye-feature developed within the core of Agnes as it approached the Ryukyu Islands of southwestern Japan. The storm passed 170 km (110 mi) south of Okinawa around 06:00 UTC on August 30 and emerged over the East China Sea. Early on August 31, Agnes achieved its peak strength with winds of 175 km/h (109 mph) and an estimated central pressure of 947 mbar (hPa; 27.96 inHg). This ranked it as a Category 2-equivalent on the Saffir–Simpson hurricane wind scale. The JMA estimated the system to have been slightly weaker, with ten-minute sustained winds of 150 km/h (93 mph) and a pressure of 950 mbar (hPa; 28.05 inHg).

As the storm moved over the East China Sea on September 1, Agnes began to interact with a mid-latitude trough situated south of South Korea and began a prolonged extratropical transition. Increasing wind shear exposed the center of the typhoon and displaced convection to the north and east. Subsequent slowing of the cyclone's forward speed as it turned northward resulted in an extended period of heavy rain for much of South Korea. The JTWC estimated Agnes to have become predominantly extratropical by the end of September 1, coinciding with the system weakening below typhoon intensity. The JMA, however, maintained the storm as a tropical system as it began moving northwest. The diminishing cyclone moved over the Korea Strait on September 3 and completed its extratropical transition that afternoon. Accelerating over the Sea of Japan, the remnant storm deepened slightly before striking the northern Japanese island of Hokkaido on September 4 with an estimated pressure of 976 mbar (hPa; 28.82 inHg). After moving over the Sea of Okhotsk, Agnes impacted the Kamchatka Peninsula of Russia on September 5. The system then moved over the open waters of the North Pacific and was last noted near the International Date Line on September 6.

== Impact ==
=== Japan ===
Deaths and damage by country
Country	Dead/Missing	Total damages
China	14	>$1 million
Japan	0	—N/a
South Korea	113	$134 million
Taiwan	32	—N/a
Sources cited in text.

On August 30, Typhoon Agnes moved through the southern Ryukyu Islands, bringing strong winds and heavy rain to the region. Several islands received more than 200 mm (7.9 in) of rain, and a peak value of 304 mm (12.0 in) was measured on Ishigaki Island. Despite passing through as a typhoon, only Tokashiki received winds of such intensity with a peak gust of 122 km/h (76 mph). A few other islands reported winds greater than 90 km/h (56 mph).

After moving over the Sea of Japan, the storm's remnants brought heavy rains to much of Japan the day after a 6.6 M_{w} earthquake rocked eastern parts of the country. Air and sea transportation across the Korean Strait was cancelled for September 3. Landslides were reported across Kyushu, though no casualties occurred. On Shin-Kamigotō, Nagasaki, rain fell at rates of 69 mm (2.7 in) per hour on September 3 as Agnes passed to the north. Rainfall in the mainland peaked at 208 mm (8.2 in) on Chausuyama in Aichi Prefecture.

=== China and Taiwan ===
Though Agnes did not directly impact Taiwan, prolonged southwesterly flow associated with the typhoon brought torrential rains to the island. Flooding in southern Taiwan was considered the worst in 30 years; 32 people were killed or left missing. More than 510 mm (20 in) of rain fell in the cities of Chiayi, Tainan, Kaohsiung, and Pingtung. Flood waters, reaching depths of 2.0 m (6.6 ft), inundated 238,256 acres (96,419 hectares) of farmland and destroyed 140 homes. An estimated 3,000 people were left homeless.

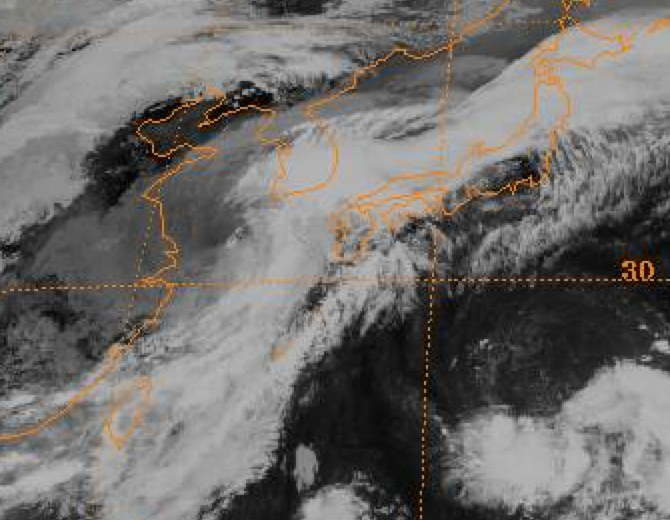
Satellite image of Tropical Storm Agnes over the East China Sea on September 2; a large plume of moisture extending northeast from the storm to South Korea and Japan is visible.

Significant water rise occurred along Yangtze estuary and Hangzhou Bay in mainland China as Agnes remained just east of the area for 36 hours and the coincidence of the spring tide. A peak storm surge of 1.6 m (5.2 ft) was measured in the region with continuous onshore flow, the highest since 1949; conversely, in areas with continuous offshore flow, water levels fell by 20 cm (7.9 in). Model simulations of the event estimated that a 1.5 m (4.9 ft) surge affected the Waigaoqiao Free Trade Zone in Shanghai. Offshore, 300 vessels sank while the resulting inland floods killed 14 people. Authorities in Shanghai mobilized 100,000 personnel to limit the extent of the floods as 200 sections of seawall collapsed. According to local newspapers, 59,700 acres (24,200 hectares) of farmland flooded and 4,280 homes were damaged. Losses were estimated in the millions of dollars.

High winds downed many trees across the region and debris littered the streets of Shanghai. United States President Jimmy Carter, wrapping up an inspection of the Chinese Navy, was scheduled to take a cruise out of the Huangpu River; however, the typhoon forced the vessel to remain at port.

=== South Korea ===
Between September 1 and 3, torrential rains affected much of South Korea, with the heaviest falling well-ahead of the storm itself. Regarded as the heaviest on record in the 20th century, at least 710 mm (28 in) fell over a two-day span in the country, resulting in tremendous flash flooding and landslides. This surpassed the previous two-day record of 570 mm (22.3 in) measured in 1928 in Seoul. A record-breaking 24‑hour rainfall of 547.4 mm (21.55 in) was also measured; however, this was later greatly surpassed by Typhoon Rusa in 2002 which produced 870.5 mm (34.27 in) during the same time span. The coastal counties of Jangheung, Haenam, and Goheung all saw approximately half of their annual precipitation, between 394 and 548 mm (15.5 and 21.6 in), in one day's time. In addition to the rains, winds up to 144 km/h (89 mph) were measured.

Communications with severed with towns along the southwestern coastline as roads and rail lines were washed away. Thousands of residents sought refuge by moving to higher ground. The Korean relief center reported that 762 homes were destroyed and another 11,700 flooded due to the storm. Other reports indicated that upwards of 5,900 homes were destroyed. More than 191,000 acres (77,000 hectares) of farmland was washed out. Throughout South Korea, 113 people died. Most of the deaths resulted from landslides, swollen rivers, and collapsed embankments. Total damage in the country amounted to $134 million, with agriculture accounting for at least $24 million. Additionally, 28,000 people were left homeless. The disaster relief agency Hope Bridge provided 7.5 billion won ($10.2 million) in aid to areas affected by the storm.

== See also ==
- 1981 Pacific typhoon season
- Typhoon Maemi – The strongest recorded typhoon to strike South Korea
- List of wettest tropical cyclones by country
  - Typhoon Rusa – Surpassed Agnes as the wettest tropical cyclone in South Korea in 2002
  - Tropical Storm Nakri (2014) – The wettest-known tropical cyclone in South Korea as of 2014
