= HMAS Hobart =

Three ships of the Royal Australian Navy (RAN) have been named HMAS Hobart, for Hobart, the capital city of Tasmania.

- HMAS Hobart (D63), a Leander-class light cruiser acquired from the Royal Navy in 1938, and operating until 1947.
- HMAS Hobart (D 39), a Perth-class guided missile destroyer commissioned in 1965 and decommissioned in 2000.
- HMAS Hobart (DDG 39), lead ship of the Hobart-class air warfare destroyers, commissioned in 2017.

== See also ==
- HMS Hobart (1794), an 18-gun sloop built by the French, captured by the Royal Navy in 1794, and operated until her sale in India in 1803.

== Battle honours ==
Ships named Hobart have earned the following battle honours:

- East Indies, 1940
- Indian Ocean, 1941
- Mediterranean, 1941
- Coral Sea, 1942
- Savo Island, 1942
- Guadalcanal, 1942
- Pacific, 1942−45
- Borneo, 1945
- Vietnam, 1967−70
