= HMS Wild Swan =

Two ships of the Royal Navy have borne the name HMS Wild Swan:

- HMS Wild Swan (1876) was an Osprey-class sloop launched in 1876. She was renamed HMS Clyde in 1904 while serving as a depot ship. She was renamed HMS Columbine in 1913, and was sold in 1920.
- HMS Wild Swan (D62) was an Admiralty Modified W-class destroyer launched in 1919. She was damaged in an air attack and then sunk in a collision with a fishing trawler in 1942.
