= Bungala River =

River in South Australia

Bungala
- Location of the river mouth in South Australia

Location
- Country: Australia
- State: South Australia
- Region: Fleurieu Peninsula

Physical characteristics
- Source
  - elevation: 225 m (738 ft)
- Mouth: Yankalilla Bay, Gulf St Vincent
  - location: Normanville
  - coordinates: 35°26′S 138°18′E
  - elevation: 0 m (0 ft)
- Length: 13 km (8.1 mi)

The Bungala River is a river on the Fleurieu Peninsula in the Australian state of South Australia.

== Course and features ==
The river rises in the lower Inman Valley and flows generally north west through the Fleurieu Peninsula, through primarily agricultural surroundings and drains into the Gulf St Vincent. The Bungala flows past the town of Yankalilla, and empties into the Yankalilla Bay, part of the Gulf of St Vincent, near Normanville. The river descends 225 metres (738 ft) over its 13-kilometre (8.1 mi) course.

The wetlands surrounding the river are classified as brackish wetlands, with the estuary also having a brackish wetland system, and coastal dunes along the neighbouring stretch of coast.

The Yankalilla Bay Catchment Action Group and the Normanville Heritage Sand Dune Rehabilitation Group are environmental groups aiming to preserving and restoring the river's natural state, whilst maintaining its use by the surrounding community. The latter are concerned primarily with Yankalilla and further inland sections of the river, and the former are concerned with the estuary and coastal section of the river.

== Etymology ==
The river's name is derived from an Aboriginal name adopted for a house built on section 1171 in the Hundred of Yankalilla by Eli Butterworth in the 1860s. He and his brother John owned and operated a steam powered flour mill on adjoining land.

== See also ==
- List of rivers of Australia § South Australia
