= Normanville, South Australia =

Normanville
- Town
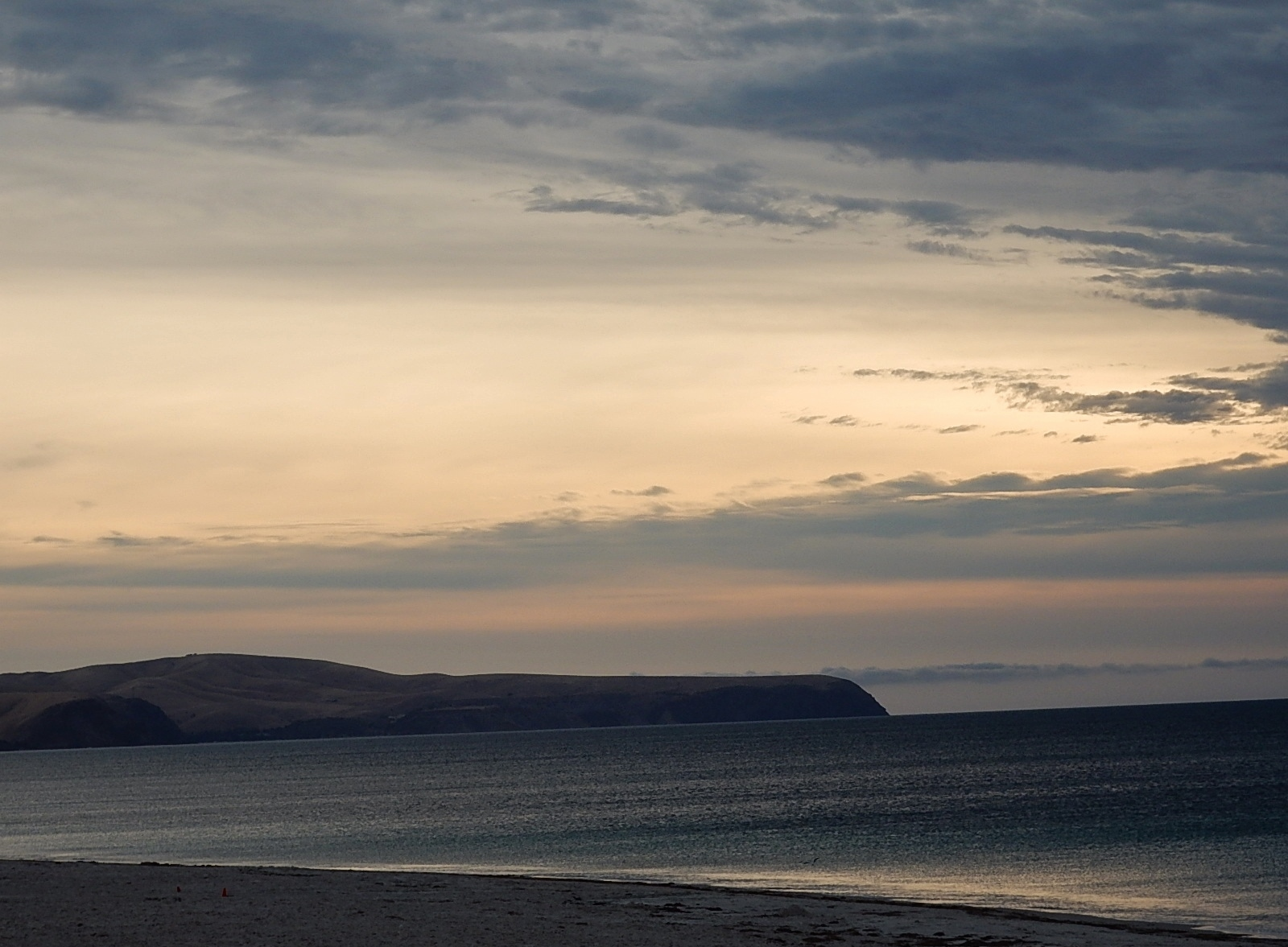
- Normanville beach at dusk

- Coordinates: 35°27′0″S 138°19′0″E
- Country: Australia
- State: South Australia
- Region: Fleurieu and Kangaroo Island
- LGA: District Council of Yankalilla
- Established: 1850

Government
  - State electorate: Mawson
  - Federal division: Mayo

Population
  - Total: 864 (2006 census)
- Postcode: 5204
- County: County of Hindmarsh
Localities around Normanville
Gulf St Vincent	Carrickalinga	Carrickalinga
Gulf St Vincent	Normanville	Yankalilla; Hay Flat
Gulf St Vincent	Wirrina Cove; Hay Flat	Hay Flat

Normanville is a coastal town in the Australian state of South Australia on the west coast of the Fleurieu Peninsula.

== Location and geography ==
Normanville is 77 kilometres (48 mi) south of Adelaide, South Australia. It is the largest regional centre on the western side of the Fleurieu Peninsula. It is situated next to the mouth of the Bungala River.

The Yankalilla River has its mouth just south of the town, at Lady Bay.

== History ==
The town was established by South Australia's first dentist, Robert Norman, in 1849. General houses for people were built first, followed by the general store, and the hotel. This was quickly followed by the local Government House, which housed the Police Officer, court house, and jail cells. Norman opened the Normanville Hotel in 1851 and a church soon after. The Normanville Hotel became the host of the first district council meeting for the area. The town eventually grew to become a successful wheat exporting area, using the nearby jetty at the current Normanville Beach as a port for ships coming and going. However, with the development of Adelaide as the capital city, it lost its prior importance.

=== Heritage listings ===
Normanville includes the following sites listed on the South Australian Heritage Register:

- 18 Main South Road: Normanville Wesleyan Cemetery
- Little Gorge Beach, Main South Road: Dickson Beach House
- Williss Drive: Ferguson's Flour Mill
- Normanville Coastal Dunes
- Normanville Court House

== Economy ==
Normanville's economy is primarily based on and driven by tourism, although primary production is still active in the area. The Normanville Beach, jetty, historic buildings and the Normanville Hotel are the main focal points for visitors. Normanville is situated in the Southern Fleurieu wine region.

== Religion ==
The Catholic Church in Normanville is dedicated to Saint Peter.

== Media ==
Normanville has a radio station – Radio 876 – which plays a mixture of Country, Easy-Listening and Nostalgia 24 hours a day.

== See also ==
- Normanville (disambiguation)
- Lady Bay, South Australia
