= USS Swan =

USS Swan is a name the U.S. Navy has used for more than one of its vessels, and may refer to:

- USS Swan (SP-1437), Maryland police boat, proposed, not used by Navy
- USS Swan (AM-34), a ship in commission from as a minesweeper from 1919 to 1922, from 1923 to 1933, and from 1934 to 1936, and as a seaplane tender (redesignated AVP-7) from 1936 to 1945
- USS Swan (AMS-37), a minesweeper laid down as PCS-1438 and later redesignated YMS-470, in commission from 1944 to 1946 and from 1950 to 1955
