= Regions of South Australia =

In South Australia, one of the states of Australia, there are many areas which are commonly known by regional names. Regions are areas that share similar characteristics. These characteristics may be natural such as the Murray River, the coastline, desert or mountains. Alternatively, the characteristics may be cultural, such as common land use. South Australia is divided by numerous sets of regional boundaries, based on different characteristics. In many cases boundaries defined by different agencies are coterminous.

== Informal divisions ==
Convention and common use has divided South Australia into a number of regions. These do not always have strict boundaries between them and have no general administrative function or status. Many of them correspond to regions used by various administrative or government agencies, but they do not always have the same boundaries or aggregate in the same way. The generally accepted regions are:

- Adelaide Plains (the northern part is sometimes known as the Lower North)
- Adelaide Hills/Mount Lofty Ranges
- Barossa Valley
- Eyre Peninsula
- Far North
- Far West Coast (& Nullarbor), defined as such for tourism (including whale-watching the southern right whale); cultural (including a native title claim by the Far West Coast Aboriginal Corporation as well as language revitalisation projects;) recreational fishing; weather forecasting; and other purposes
- Fleurieu Peninsula
- Flinders Ranges
- Kangaroo Island
- Limestone Coast is a name which came into use in the early 21st century, supplanting the names Lower South East and Upper South East
- Mid North
  - Clare Valley
- Murray Mallee
  - Murraylands
  - Riverland
- Yorke Peninsula
  - Copper Triangle

Most of the other regional divisions of the state use a combination of these same labels, sometimes grouped, and sometimes with precise boundaries that might be slightly different in each case.

== Australian government ==
=== Australian Bureau of Statistics ===
The Australian Bureau of Statistics has multiple regional structures for which it analyses and reports data. These regional structures derive from the Australian Standard Geographical Classification (AGSC). The AGSC defines at the very smallest level, the Census Collection District (CCD). These CCD's aggregate to form the Statistical Local Area (SLA), which is the common base unit for each of the larger regional structures. The boundaries of the SLA are designed to be typically coterminous with Local Government Areas unless the LGA does not fit entirely into a Statistical Subdivision (SSD), or is not of a comparative nature to other LGA's. Bureau of Statistics provides statistics for Local Government Areas, as well as three other statistical structures: Statistical Divisions, Statistical Regions, and Statistical Districts.

==== Statistical Divisions ====
Statistical Divisions (SD) form the main structural hierarchy of statistical analysis. These regions are structured to provide a broad range of social, demographic and economic statistics. The basis for the boundary delineations center on socioeconomic criteria. The eight Statistical Divisions in South Australia are:

- Adelaide
- Outer Adelaide
- Yorke and Lower North
- Murray Lands
- South East
- Eyre
- Northern
- Offshore & Migratory

=== Weather forecasting ===
The Australian Bureau of Meteorology (BOM) provides forecasts and observations within South Australia and its adjoining waters using the following 15 land areas which are known as “districts” and 11 areas known as “coastal waters” which are located within both the state's jurisdiction and Australia's maritime jurisdiction:

Districts

- Adelaide Metropolitan
- Mount Lofty Ranges
- Yorke Peninsula
- Kangaroo Island
- Upper South East
- Lower South East
- Murraylands
- Riverland
- Flinders
- Mid North
- West Coast
- Lower Eyre Peninsula
- Eastern Eyre Peninsula
- North West Pastoral
- North East Pastoral

Coastal waters

- Adelaide Metropolitan Waters
- Gulf St Vincent
- Investigator Strait
- Far West Coast
- Upper West Coast
- Lower West Coast
- Spencer Gulf
- Central Coast
- South Central Coast
- Upper South East Coast
- Lower South East Coast

== South Australian Government ==
=== South Australian Government regions ===
South Australian government departments and agencies with some exceptions use a uniform set of boundaries to describe the extent of 12 administrative regions within the state which are used to “develop and improve reporting, planning and service delivery systems”.

==== Adelaide Hills ====
Adelaide Hills occupies the area in the Mount Lofty Ranges immediately east of the regions of East, Northern and Southern Adelaide, and consists of the following local government areas - the Adelaide Hills Council and the District Council of Mount Barker.

==== Barossa Light and Lower North ====
Barossa Light and Lower North occupies land located immediately of the north of the Adelaide metropolitan area and contains the following local government areas - the Town of Gawler, the Adelaide Plains Council, the Barossa Council and the Light Regional Council.

==== Eastern Adelaide ====
Eastern Adelaide occupies the area to the immediate north, east and south of the Adelaide city centre and consists of the following local government areas: the City of Adelaide, the City of Burnside, the City of Campbelltown, the City of Norwood Payneham & St Peters, the City of Prospect, the City of Unley and the Town of Walkerville.

==== Eyre Western ====
Eyre Western consists of land on the Eyre Peninsula which is part of a local government area, land in the west of the state on the coastline between Eyre Peninsula and the border with Western Australia including the Maralinga Tjarutja lands, all of the islands within the Great Australian Bight and those islands adjoining the Eyre Peninsula coastline. It includes the following local government areas - District Council of Ceduna, District Council of Cleve, District Council of Elliston, District Council of Franklin Harbour, District Council of Kimba, District Council of Lower Eyre Peninsula, City of Port Lincoln, District Council of Streaky Bay, District Council of Tumby Bay, Wudinna District Council and City of Whyalla.

==== Far North ====
Far North consists of all inland regions in the north of the state including the Anangu Pitjantjatjara Yankunytjatjara lands. It is bounded to the north and north-east by the Northern Territory and Queensland, in part to the west by Western Australia and in part to the east by New South Wales and by the regions of Eyre Western, Yorke and Mid North, and Murray and Mallee from west to east in the state's south. While most of it is in the state's unincorporated area, it does include the following local government areas - the City of Port Augusta, the Flinders Ranges Council, the District Council of Coober Pedy and the Municipal Council of Roxby Downs.

==== Fleurieu and Kangaroo Island ====
Fleurieu and Kangaroo Island consists of all of the land on both the Fleurieu Peninsula and Kangaroo Island, and some land to the north-east of the Fleurieu Peninsula including the western side of Lake Alexandrina and islands both in the Lake Alexandrina system and adjoining the coastline. It consists of the following local government areas: the Alexandrina Council, the City of Victor Harbor, the Kangaroo Island Council and the District Council of Yankalilla.

==== Limestone Coast ====
Limestone Coast consists of land in the south east of the state which includes the following local government areas - the City of Mount Gambier and the District Councils of Grant, Kingston, Robe, Tatiara and Naracoorte Lucindale, and the Wattle Range Council.

==== Murray and Mallee ====
Murray and Mallee consists of land in the east of the state extending from the continental coastline in the south to the borders with New South Wales and Victoria in the east. It is also bounded by the Limestone Coast to its south and by the following regions to its west and north - Fleurieu and Kangaroo Island, the Adelaide Hills, Barossa Light and Lower North, Yorke and Mid North and Far North. It includes the following local government areas - the Berri Barmera Council, the Coorong District Council, the District Council of Karoonda East Murray, the District Council of Loxton Waikerie, the Mid Murray Council, the Southern Mallee District Council, the Renmark Paringa Council and the Rural City of Murray Bridge.

==== Northern Adelaide ====
Northern Adelaide occupies the northern end of the Adelaide metropolitan area and consists of the following local government areas: the City of Playford, the City of Salisbury, the City of Tea Tree Gully and the east half of the City of Port Adelaide Enfield.

==== Southern Adelaide ====
Southern Adelaide occupies the southern end of the Adelaide metropolitan area and consists of the following local government areas: the City of Holdfast Bay, the City of Marion, the City of Mitcham and the City of Onkaparinga.

==== Western Adelaide ====
Western Adelaide occupies the area in the Adelaide metropolitan area located to the north-west of the Adelaide city centre and consists of the following local government areas: the City of Charles Sturt, the City of West Torrens and the western half of the City of Port Adelaide Enfield.

==== Yorke and Mid North ====
Yorke and Mid North consists of land on the Yorke Peninsula including some nearby islands and land on the east side of Spencer Gulf extending from just south of Hamley Bridge in the south to just south of Quorn in the north. The latter area is commonly known as the Mid North. Yorke and Mid North consists of the following local governments within the area commonly known as the ‘Mid North’ - the District Council of Clare and Gilbert Valleys, the Regional Council of Goyder, the District Council of Mount Remarkable, the Northern Areas Council, the District Council of Orroroo Carrieton, the District Council of Peterborough, the Port Pirie Regional Council and Wakefield Regional Council, and the following local government areas fully or partly within the Yorke Peninsula - the District Council of Barunga West, the District Council of the Copper Coast and the Yorke Peninsula Council.

=== Department of Environment, Water and Natural Resources ===
==== Protected areas ====
South Australia's protected areas are grouped into 11 regions:

- Adelaide
- Adelaide Hills
- Barossa
- Clare Valley
- Eyre Peninsula
- Fleurieu Peninsula
- Flinders Ranges and Outback
- Kangaroo Island
- Limestone Coast
- Murray River
- Yorke Peninsula

==== Natural resource management ====
The Natural Resources Management Act 2004 established the following Natural Resources Management (NRM) regions “to give ownership of and responsibility for NRM to regional communities”: Adelaide and Mount Lofty Ranges, Alinytjara Wilurara, Eyre Peninsula, Kangaroo Island, Northern and Yorke, South Australian Arid Lands, South Australian Murray-Darling Basin and the South East.

=== Primary Industries and Regions SA (PIRSA) ===
Primary Industries and Regions SA (PIRSA) supports economic development in the non-metropolitan regions of South Australia. It identifies eight non-metropolitan regions:

- Adelaide Hills
- Barossa, Light and Lower North
- Eyre and Western
- Far North
- Fleurieu and Kangaroo Island
- Limestone Coast
- Murray and Mallee
- Yorke and Mid North

== Electoral districts ==
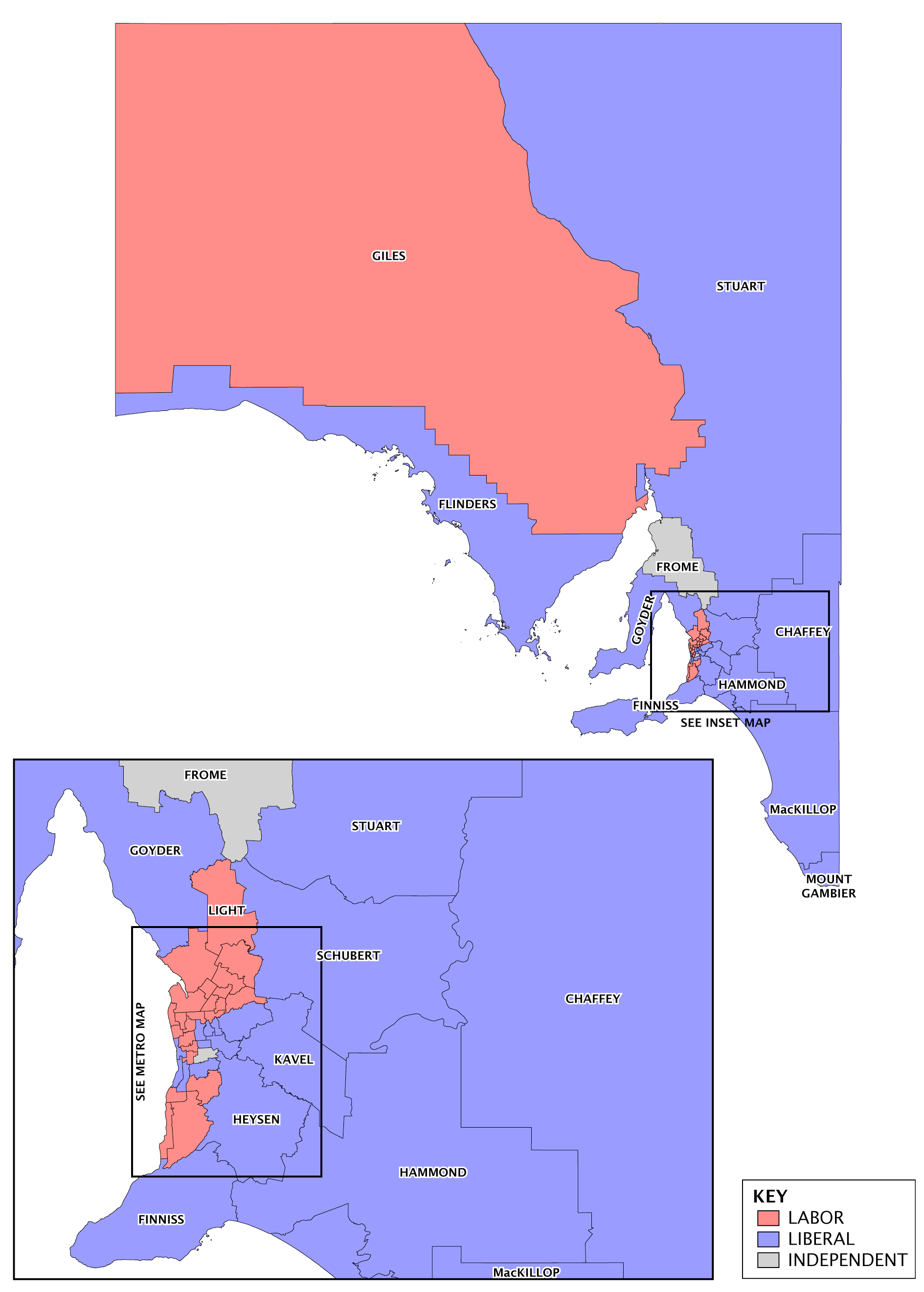
Map of rural state electoral districts showing results from the 2014 election and changes since.

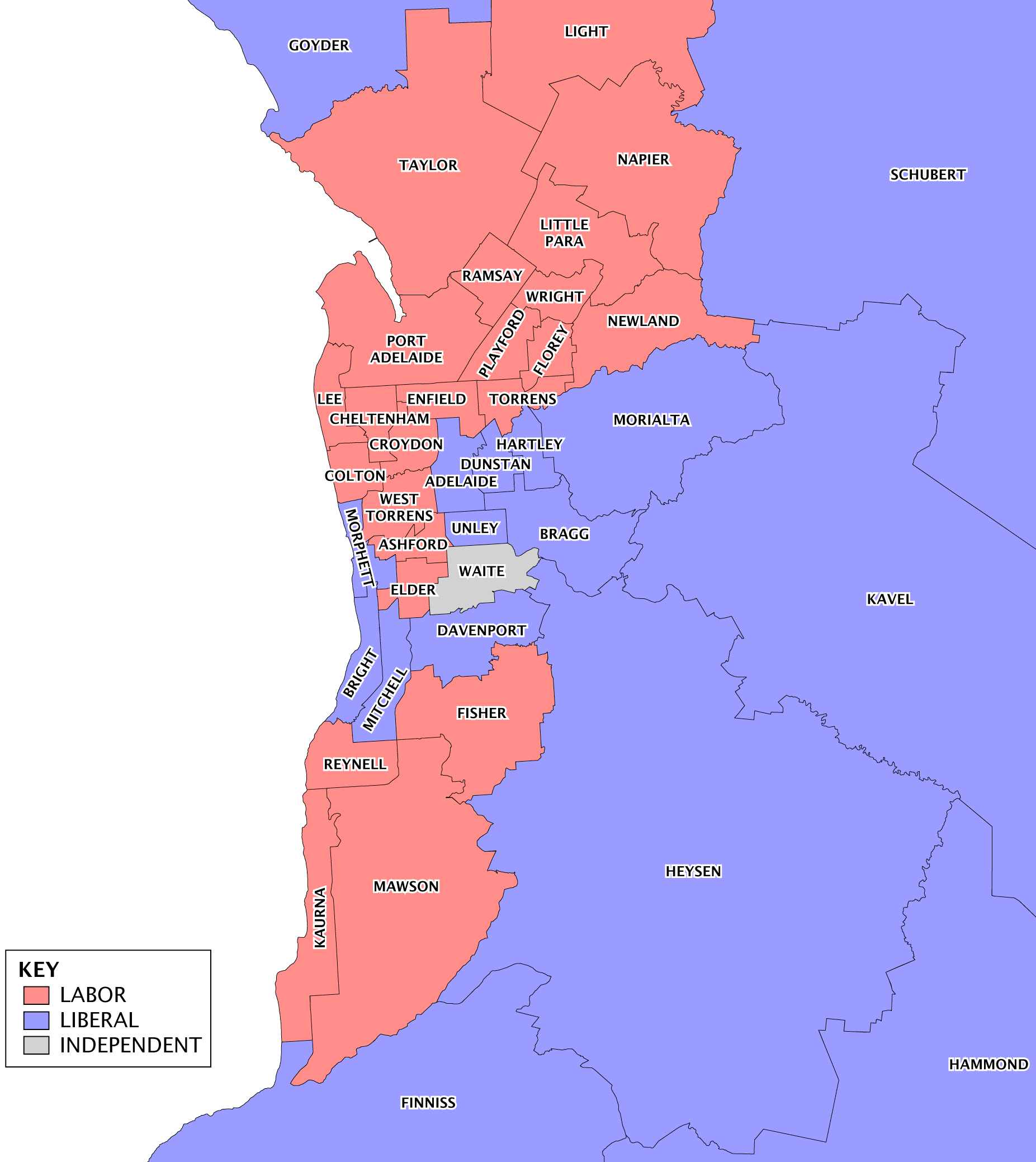
Map of metropolitan state electoral districts showing results from the 2014 election and changes since.

South Australia is divided into 47 electoral districts each of which elects a single member into the South Australian House of Assembly (also called the lower house of parliament).

It is divided into ten electoral divisions which each elect a member into the House of Representatives of the Parliament of Australia. These divisions are:

- Adelaide
- Barker
- Boothby
- Grey
- Hindmarsh
- Kingston
- Makin
- Mayo
- Sturt
- Spence

The federal divisions overlay the state electoral districts, but do not aggregate them. A state district may be divided amongst two or more federal divisions.

== Local government ==
South Australia's Local Government Areas (LGAs) have grouped themselves into seven Regional Local Government Associations. These are:

- LGA Metropolitan Group
- Central Local Government Region
- Eyre Peninsula Local Government Association
- Murray and Mallee Local Government Association
- Southern and Hills Local Government Association
- South East Local Government Association
- Provincial Cities Association
- Outback areas do not have local government except for a small number of towns

== Biogeographic regions ==
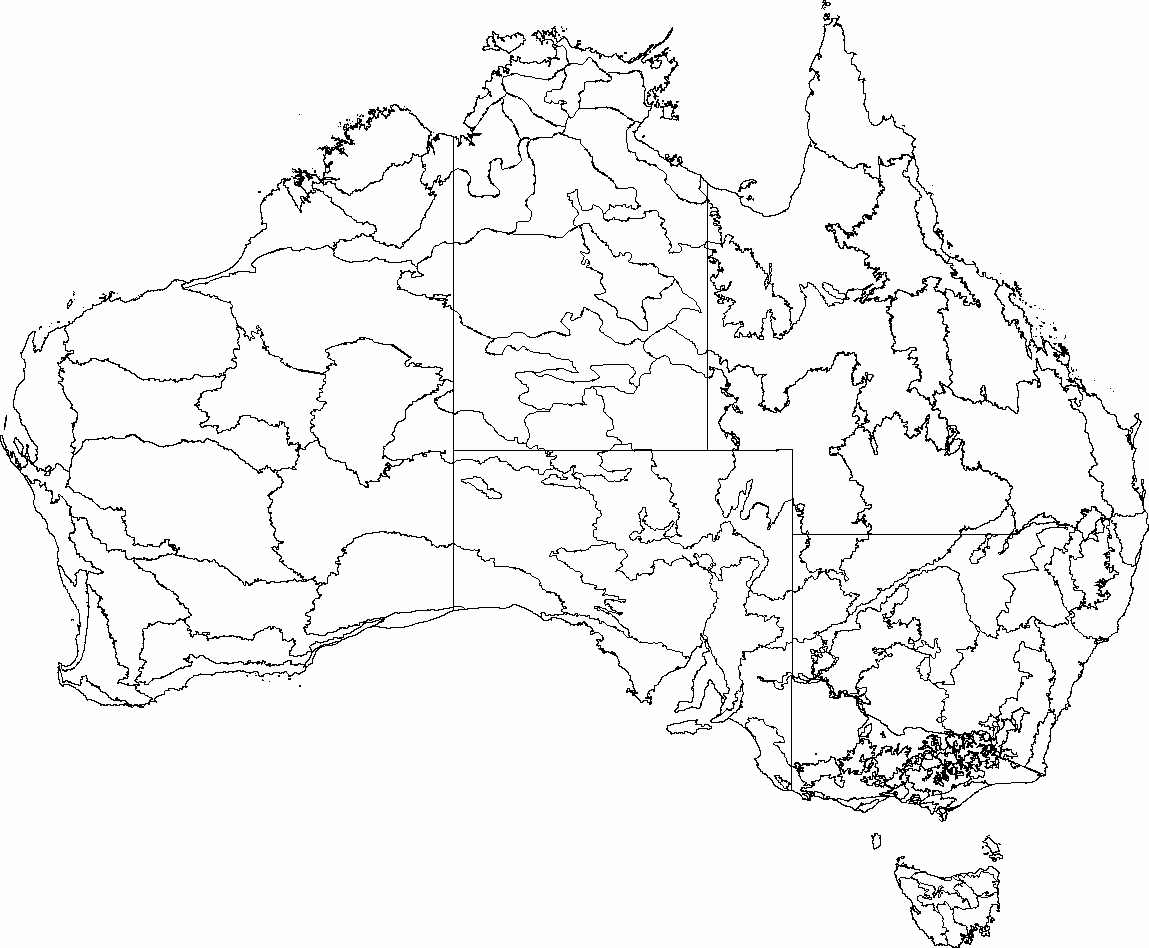
IBRA 6.1 regions map

The Interim Biogeographic Regionalisation for Australia (IBRA) is a biogeographic regionalisation of Australia; divided into 89 bioregions and 419 subregions. Each region is a land area made up of a group of interacting ecosystems that are repeated in similar form across the landscape. Regions and subregion cross state and territory boundaries. The bioregions that are located wholly or partly in South Australia are:

- Broken Hill Complex (shared with New South Wales)
- Central Ranges (shared with Western Australia and Northern Territory)
- Channel Country (mostly in Queensland but also South Australia, New South Wales and Northern Territory)
- Eyre Yorke Block
- Finke (shared with Northern Territory)
- Flinders Lofty Block (mostly in South Australia but extends to New South Wales)
- Furneaux (shared with Victoria)
- Great Victoria Desert (shared with Western Australia)
- Gawler
- Kanmantoo
- Murray Darling Depression (shared with New South Wales and Victoria)
- Naracoorte Coastal Plain (shared with Victoria)
- Nullarbor (shared with Western Australia)
- Riverina (mostly in New South Wales and Victoria)
- Simpson Strzelecki Dunefields (shared with New South Wales, Northern Territory and Queensland)

== Industry regions ==
=== Tourist regions ===
South Australia has been divided into the following 12 tourism regions for the purpose of coordinating both government and tourism industry efforts to promote South Australia as a visitor destination: Adelaide, Adelaide Hills, Barossa, Clare Valley, Eyre Peninsula, Fleurieu Peninsula, Flinders Ranges and Outback, Kangaroo Island, Limestone Coast, Murray River, Lakes & Coorong, Riverland and Yorke Peninsula.

=== Wine regions ===
The wine industry has a number of defined wine zones and regions, however they do not cover the entire state (especially as some areas are not suitable for growing grapes). These are controlled as Australian geographical indications by the Australian Grape and Wine Authority. As of March 2015, the following zones are in use in South Australia: Barossa, Far North, Fleurieu, Lower Murray, Limestone Coast, Mount Lofty Ranges and The Peninsulas.

== See also ==
- List of regions of Australia
