= List of wineries in McLaren Vale =

This is a list of wineries in the McLaren Vale wine region, a major wine-producing region located within the Fleurieu wine zone in South Australia. There are an estimated 74 cellar doors and over 160 vineyards in the region.

The wineries are centred around five main areas: Currency Creek, Old Reynella, McLaren Vale, McLaren Flat, Willunga and Aldinga.

== Currency Creek wineries ==
- One Paddock Currency Creek Winery

== Aldinga wineries ==
- Cradle of Hills
- Dyson Wines
- Sellicks Hill Wines
- Big Easy Radio

== McLaren Flat wineries ==
- Nick Haselgrove Wines
- DogRidge Wines
- Gemtree Vineyards
- Graham Stevens Wines
- Grounded Cru
- Hugo Wines
- Kangarilla Road Winery
- Lavina Wines
- Mr. Riggs Wine Company
- Possums Wines
- Scarpantonni Estate Wines
- Shottesbrooke Vineyards
- Woodstock Estate
- Yangarra Estate
- Zonte's Footstep

== McLaren Vale wineries ==
- Alpha Box and Dice Wines
- Angove Family Winemakers
- Beach Road Wines
- Bekker's Wine
- Bondar Wines
- Brash Higgins Wine Co
- Brick Kiln
- Chalk Hill Wines
- Chapel Hill
- Conte Estate Wines
- Coriole Vineyards
- Curtis Winery
- d'Arenberg
- Dandelion Vineyards
- Dennis Wines
- Dodgy Brothers Wines
- Dowie Doole Wines
- Dub Style Wines
- Ekhidna Wines
- Foggo Wines
- Fork in the Road Wines
- Fox Creek Wines
- Hugh Hamilton Wines
- Inkwell Wines
- Ivybrook Farm
- J & J Wines
- Kay Brothers Amery
- Leconfield Wines
- Lino Ramble
- Lloyd Brothers Wine
- Maximus Wines
- Maxwell Wines
- McLaren Vale Winemakers
- McLaren Vale III Associates
- Noon Winery
- Oliverhill Winery
- Olivers Taranga
- Paxton Wines
- Penny's Hill
- Pertaringa Wines
- Pirramimma Wines
- Primo Estate
- Price's Wines
- Primo Estate
- Rosemount Wines
- Samuel's Gorge
- SC Pannell
- Serafino Wines
- Sherrah Wines
- Shingleback Wines
- Tintara
- Varney Wines
- Waywood Wines
- White Feather Red
- Wirra Wirra Vineyards

Blewitt Springs Wine Co

== Old Reynella wineries ==
- Geoff Merrill Wines

== Willunga wineries ==
- Ashley Hills Estate
- Battle of Bosworth Wines
- Fleurieu Hills Vineyard
- Hampshire Vineyard
- Hither & Yon
- Linger Longer Vineyard
- Magpie Springs
- Minko Wines
- Ortus Wines
- Willunga Creek Wines
- Zimmermann Wines

== See also ==
- South Australian wine
- List of wineries in South Australia
- List of wineries in the Barossa Valley
- List of wineries in the Clare Valley
- List of wineries in the Eden Valley
