= Southern Fleurieu wine region =

Wine region of South Australia

Coordinates: 35.57542°S 138.37825°E

Southern Fleurieu
- Wine region
- Type: Australian Geographical Indication
- Year established: 2001
- Country: Australia
- Part of: Fleurieu zone
- Climate region: 'I'
- Heat units: 1628
- Precipitation (annual average): 121 mm (4.8 in)
- Size of planted vineyards: 510 ha (1,300 acres)
- No. of vineyards: 50 growers
- Grapes produced: 52 tonnes (51 long tons; 57 short tons)
- Varietals produced: Shiraz, Chardonnay, Cabernet Sauvignon & Sauvignon Blanc
- No. of wineries: 19
- Comments: 2014

Southern Fleurieu wine region is a wine region in South Australia that is located on the Fleurieu Peninsula and the portion of the Mount Lofty Ranges, extending north east from the peninsula to near Willunga in the west and to near Ashbourne in the east. The region received appellation as an Australian Geographical Indication (AGI) in 2001 and as of 2014, has a total planted area of 510 ha (1,300 acres) and is represented by 50 growers and at least 19 wineries.

== Extent and appellation ==
The Southern Fleurieu wine region is one of the five wine regions forming the Fleurieu zone, which located to the immediate south of Adelaide city centre in South Australia. The wine region extents from Cape Jervis in the south west across most of the Fleurieu Peninsula to the portion of the Mount Lofty Ranges located to the immediate northeast of the peninsula and finishing near Willunga on the west side of the ranges and near Ashbourne in the east side of the ranges.

It bounded by the following wine regions - McLaren Vale to its north-west, Langhorne Creek to its northeast and Currency Creek to its east, and by the Adelaide Hills wine zone to its north. The term ‘Southern Fleurieu’ was registered as an AGI in June 2001. As of 2014, the region contains 50 growers and at least 19 wineries.

== Grapes and wine ==
As of 2014, the most common plantings in the Southern Fleurieu wine region within a total planted area of 510 ha (1,300 acres) are Shiraz (24.7%) followed by Chardonnay (18%), Cabernet Sauvignon (15.3%) and Sauvignon Blanc (14.1%).

== See also ==
- Fleurieu zone, wider wine growing zone
- South Australian wine

== Citations and references ==
=== References ===
- Phylloxera and Grape Industry Board of SA (PGIBSA) (2014), "Australian regional winegrape crush survey online" (PDF), South Australian Winegrape Utilisation and Pricing Surveys, Phylloxera and Grape Industry Board of SA, ISSN 1442-6048, archived from the original (PDF) on 6 November 2014
