= Lower Murray zone (wine) =

Wine zone in South Australia

- Wine region
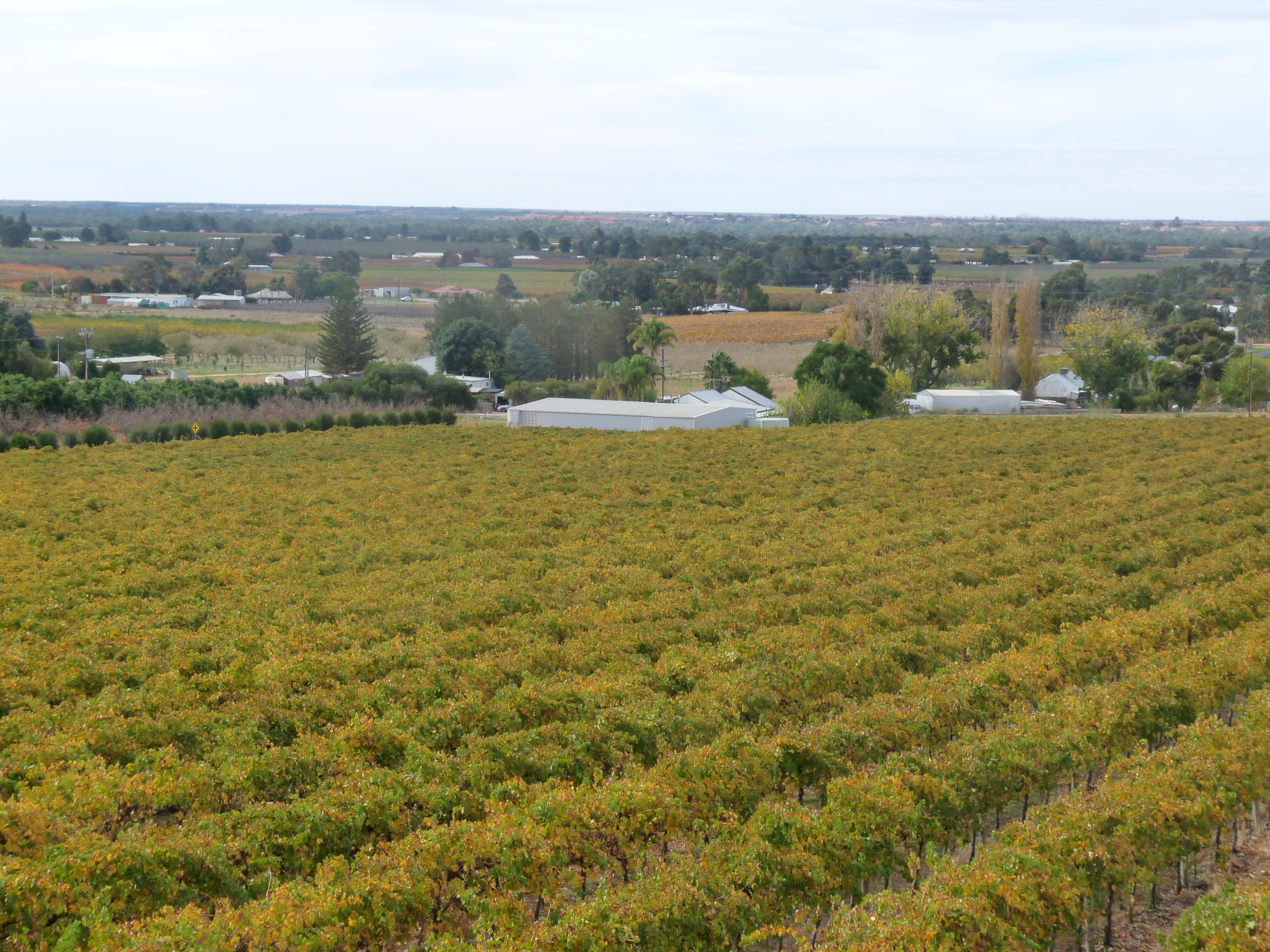
- Type: Australian Geographical Indication
- Year established: 1996.
- Country: Australia
- Part of: South Australia
- Sub-regions: Riverland

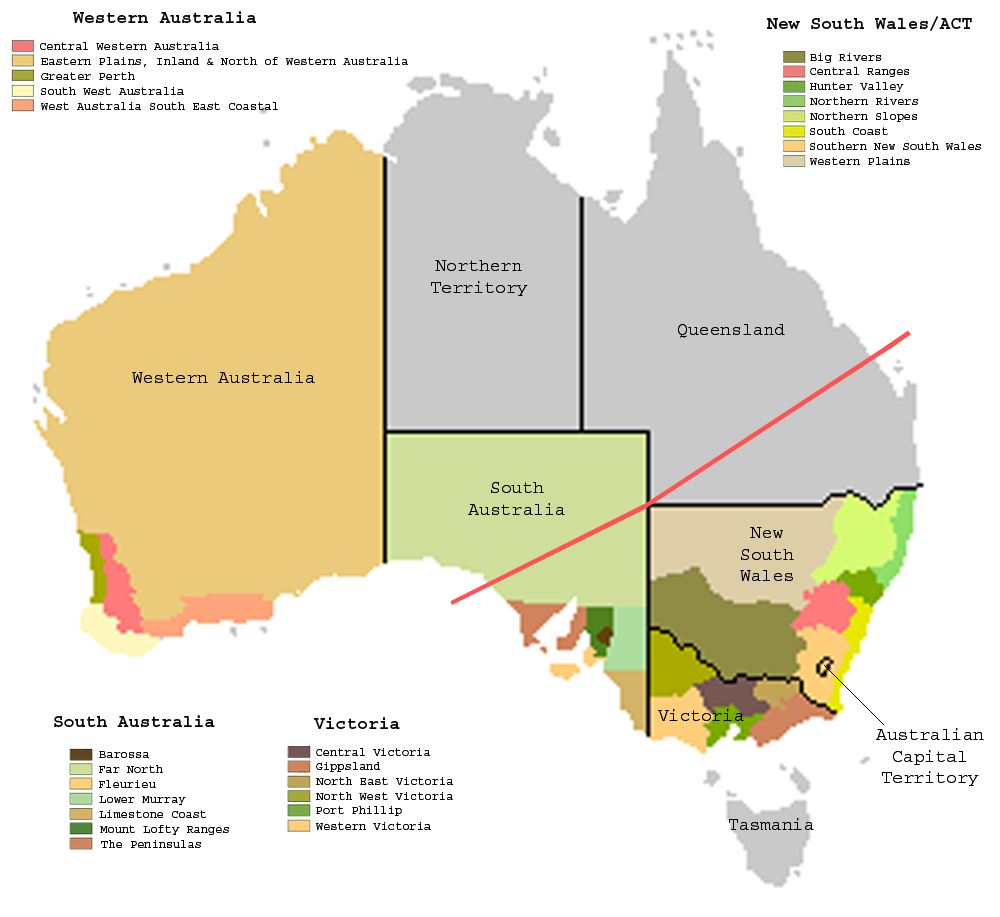
Australian wine zones & regions

Lower Murray zone is a wine zone located in the state of South Australia which covers the portion of the state south of a line of latitude approximately in line with Crystal Brook, east of a line of longitude approximately in line with Truro and north of a line of latitude approximately in line with Cape Willoughby at the east end of Kangaroo Island. The zone is bounded by the following wine zones: Far North to its north, the Mount Lofty Ranges, Barossa and Fleurieu (from north to south) to its west and the Limestone Coast to its south. The term ‘Lower Murray’ was registered as an Australian Geographical Indication under the Wine Australia Corporation Act 1980 on 7 December 1996. As of 1998, the zone only contains one region - the Riverland.

== See also ==
- South Australian wine
