= Coriole Vineyards =

Winery in South Australia

Coriole
- Location: McLaren Vale, South Australia, Australia
- Wine region: McLaren Vale
- Founded: 1969
- Key people: Hugh Lloyd; Molly Lloyd; Mark Lloyd
- Known for: Lloyd Reserve Shiraz
- Varietals: Chenin blanc, Sangiovese, Shiraz
- Other products: Olive oil, Olives
- Other attractions: Coriole Music Festival
- Distribution: International
- Tasting: Open to public
- Website: www.coriole.com

Coriole Vineyards is a winery located in the McLaren Vale wine region of South Australia.

== History ==
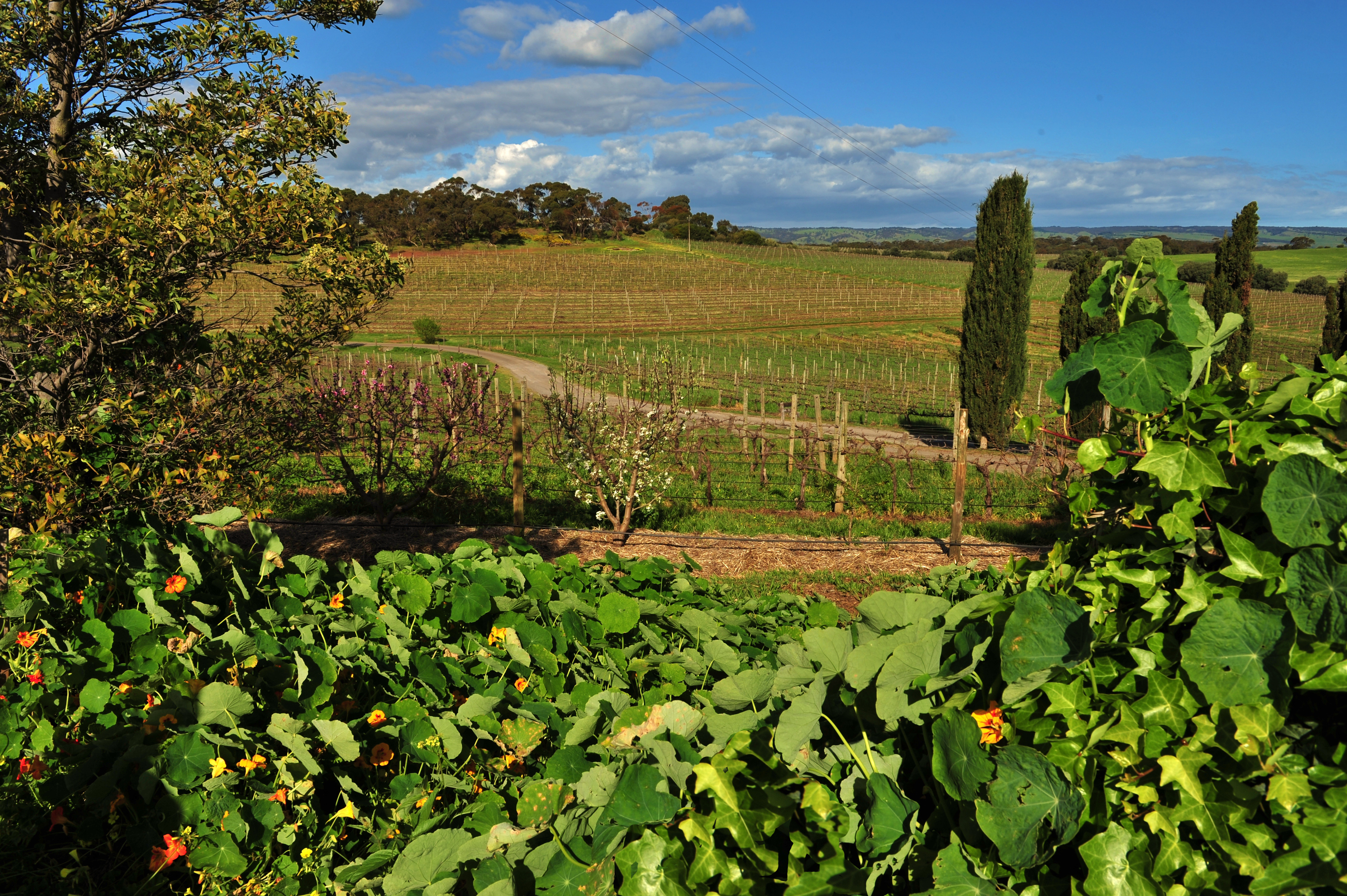
Vineyard at Coriole Wines

The original house and barn were built around 1860. The property was known as Clark Hill and owned by Robert Balderston, who may have planted the first Shiraz vineyard in the late 1800s or early 1900s. In 1962, after several changes in ownership, Coriole was sold to John Snell, who established Australia's first organic winery, Chateau Bon Sante, and built a small winery, which forms the basis of the existing modern winery.

In 1968 the property was bought by Hugh and Molly Lloyd, who released the first Coriole label vintage in 1969. with the help of winemaker Graeme Stevens.

In 1985 Coriole pioneered the introduction of the Italian Sangiovese grape variety into Australia.

Coriole was the first winery in Australia to produce Fiano, with a vineyard planted in 2001 and the first commercial release in 2005, and Piquepoul, with a vineyard planted in 2009 and the first commercial release in 2015.

== Description ==
The winery is located in the McLaren Vale wine region in the state of South Australia.

As of 1998 it was exporting wine to the U.S., Canada and various countries in Europe and Asia. They produce red wines from grape varieties such as Cabernet Sauvignon, Shiraz, Sangiovese, Nero d'Avola, and Negroamaro. Their range of whites is made from grapes such as Chenin blanc, Fiano, and Piquepoul.

The business also sells olive oil, balsamic vinegar, and local cheeses.

== Events ==
=== Coriole Music Festival ===
The Coriole Music Festival is a classical music festival comprising three concerts that has been taking place at Coriole since 1999. A different theme has been chosen each year, and the music directors have included Christopher Burrell, Anthony Steel, Anna Goldsworthy, and Simon Cobcroft.

=== Here's to Now ===
From 2013 to 2018, Coriole played host to the Here's to Now music festival, held in summer. One reviewer wrote that the festival "could be described as 'WOMAD on a millennial budget'".

== See also ==
- Australian wine
- Cult wine
- South Australian wine
- List of wineries in McLaren Vale
