= Langhorne Creek =

Langhorne Creek may refer to:

- Langhorne Creek, South Australia
- Langhorne Creek wine region
