= Angove Family Winemakers =

Winery in South Australia

- Location: McLaren Vale and Riverland, South Australia, Australia
- Wine region: McLaren Vale
- Founded: 1886; 140 years ago
- Known for: Lloyd Reserve Shiraz
- Varietals: Chenin blanc, Sangiovese, Shiraz
- Other products: Olive oil, Olives
- Distribution: International
- Tasting: Open to public
- Website: www.angove.com.au

Angove Family Winemakers is a winery, operating in the McLaren Vale wine region and Riverland wine region in South Australia. In 2022, it was ranked the nineteenth largest Australian wine company by production.

== History ==
The Angove Family Winemakers history began in 1886 when Dr William Angove emigrated to Australia from Cornwall. He established a medical practice at Tea Tree Gully, an Adelaide suburb. Along with other medical doctors at the time, including Dr Henry Lindeman and Dr Christopher Rawson Penfold, he began cultivating vines and making wine.

In 1910, Angove was succeeded by his son Thomas Carlyon, who established a winery at Renmark in the South Australian Riverland. At the time, there was no winemaking or distilling activity in the region. Renmark was struggling economically and the winery’s move to the district assured the settlement’s survival.

In the mid 20th century, Angove wine grapes were sourced from its vineyards at Tea Tree Gully while the Renmark operation focused on fortified wine and brandy production. In 1969, following a lack of available grapes from Tea Trea Gully, the first plantings occurred at the Nanya Vineyard. Fifteen years later, 480 ha (1,200 acres) were bearing fruit in what was the first broad-acre vineyard, and the largest in the southern hemisphere at the time. Premium grape varieties dominated the planting mix and the company showed the rest of the industry what could be achieved in the Riverland.

== St Agnes Distillery ==
The St Agnes Distillery is a producer of brandy in South Australia.

In the early 1920s, T.C. "Skipper" Angove spent time studying the production of brandy in the Cognac region in France. In 1925, he made the first Angove brandy, using neutral white grape varieties and the traditional double distilled, pot-still process, developed in France centuries earlier.

The result was the beginning of the St Agnes Brandy label. The style revolutionised the Australian brandy market with other distillers following the lead he set. After World War II, Thomas William Carlyon Angove took over from his father as managing director of the company.

== See also ==
- List of wineries in McLaren Vale
- List of oldest companies in Australia
- South Australian wine
