= Anthony Steel (arts leader) =

Anthony Steel AM is an English-born Australian arts administrator, known for being the first general manager of the Adelaide Festival in 1972.

== Early life and education ==
Anthony Steel was born in England. He was educated at Oxford and Cambridge universities.

== Career ==
Steel started his career in the arts in the early 1960s as general manager of the London Mozart Players. He became assistant general secretary of the London Symphony Orchestra and then the first planning manager of the South Bank Concert Halls before moving to Adelaide, South Australia, in 1972 as the first general manager of the Adelaide Festival Centre and artistic director of the Adelaide Festivals of 1974, 1976 and 1978. He returned to Adelaide to direct two more festivals in 1984 and 1986, after a spell as general manager of the Los Angeles Philharmonic and another as director of the Singapore Arts Festival.

In 1986 he was appointed interim co-director of Australian Dance Theatre in Adelaide, along with Dutch choreographer Lenny Westerdijk.

In the 1990s Steel was the founding director of two other Australian festivals – the National Festival of Australian Theatre in Canberra (1990 and 1992) and the Brisbane Biennial Music Festival (1991 and 1993). He was producer of World Expo on Stage (the performing arts program of World Expo 88 in Brisbane) and director of the Sydney Festivals of 1995 to 1997.

He has served as a member of the Australia Council and as the inaugural chair of that body's Performing Arts Board.

In late 1997 he returned to Adelaide to live. For the following decade he was engaged in projects for, among others, the Hong Kong Arts Development Council, the South Australian and Tasmanian governments, and the Sydney Opera House Trust. In 1999 he undertook a six-month engagement as executive producer for the Meryl Tankard Australian Dance Theatre, and in 2000 acted as executive chair of the Barossa Music Festival.

He was chair of the advisory board of the Arts Management Program of the University of South Australia, and a member of the Board of Leigh Warren & Dancers. From 1999 to 2002 he served as a board member of the Adelaide Festival.

In 2001 he was head of school at the Flinders Street School of Music, negotiating the school's merger with the Elder Conservatorium at Adelaide University, which took effect on 1 January 2002. For the rest of that year he acted as a consultant to the resultant Elder School of Music for its capital works program.

In 2006, and from 2016 to 2018, he was music director of the Coriole Music Festival at the winery at McLaren Vale.

He was engaged in projects on behalf of the Confederation of Australian International Arts Festivals and Leigh Warren & Dancers.

He was president of Recitals Australia from 2007 until 2014, a member of the boards of Leigh Warren & Dancers and the Adelaide Symphony Orchestra, and a visiting research fellow at the University of Adelaide.

He wrote a series of articles about the 2008 Festival of Arts for the Independent Weekly, and chaired all ten of the festival's lunchtime forums with visiting artists.

== Recognition ==
In 1978 Steel was appointed a Member of the Order of Australia for services to the arts.

In 2005 he was awarded a fellowship from the Theatre Board of the Australia Council to write a memoir.

In 2007 he received the premier's lifetime achievement award at the Ruby Awards, South Australia's annual arts and cultural awards.
