= Far North zone (wine) =

- Wine region
- Type: Australian Geographical Indication
- Year established: 1996.
- Country: Australia
- Part of: South Australia
- Sub-regions: Southern Flinders Ranges

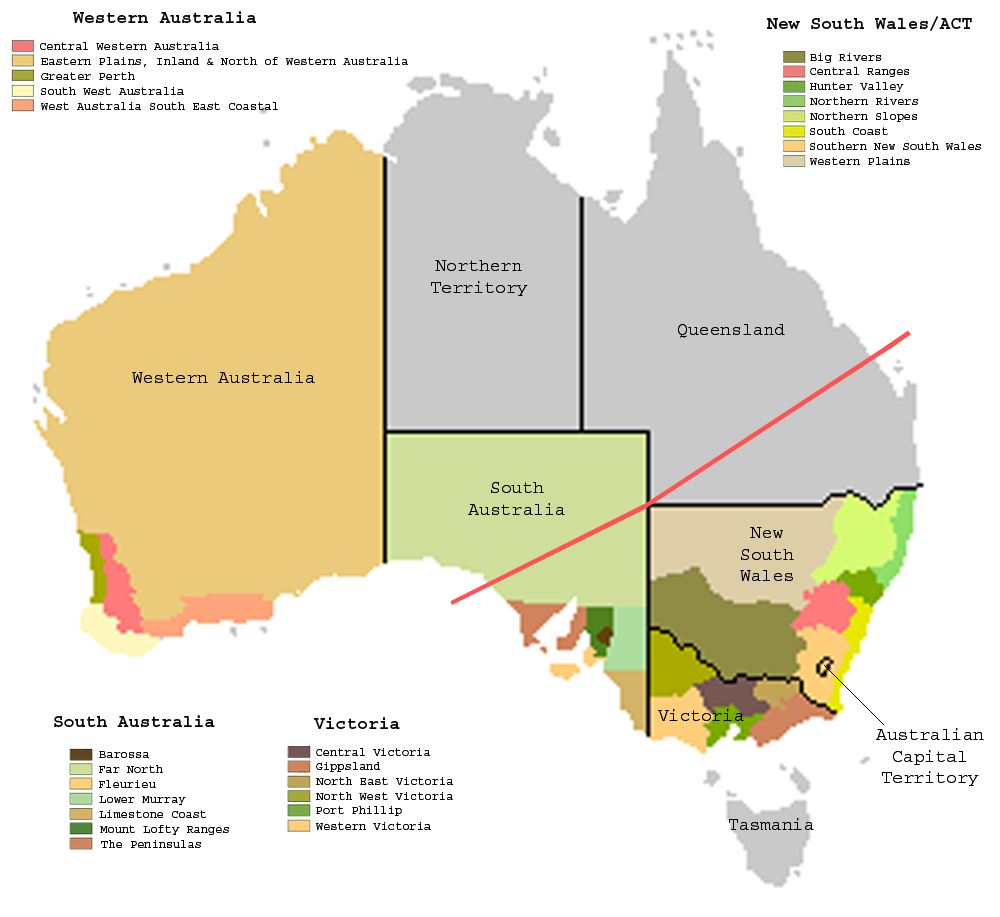
Australian wine zones & regions

Far North zone is a wine zone located in the state of South Australia which covers the entire state north of a line of latitude approximately in line with Crystal Brook (i.e. 33 degrees 21 minutes south). The zone is bounded by the following wine zones to its south: The Peninsulas, the Mount Lofty Ranges and the Lower Murray (from west to east). The term ‘Far North’ was registered as an Australian Geographical Indication under the Wine Australia Corporation Act 1980 on 27 December 1996. As of 2003, the zone only contains the Southern Flinders Ranges.

== See also ==
- South Australian wine
