= Currency Creek wine region =

Wine region of South Australia

Currency Creek
- Wine region
- Type: Australian Geographical Indication
- Year established: 2001
- Years of wine industry: since 1972
- Country: Australia
- Part of: Fleurieu zone
- Climate region: ‘I’
- Heat units: 1525
- Precipitation (annual average): 155 mm (6.1 in)
- Size of planted vineyards: 960 ha (2,400 acres)
- Grapes produced: 7,269 tonnes (7,154 long tons; 8,013 short tons)
- Varietals produced: Shiraz, Cabernet Sauvignon, Chardonnay, Merlot
- No. of wineries: 4
- Comments: climate & production: 2014

Currency Creek wine region is a wine region in South Australia that is located on the west side of Lake Alexandrina between Milang, the Murray Mouth, Port Elliot and just south of Ashbourne. The region received appellation as an Australian Geographical Indication (AGI) in 2001 and as of 2014, has a total planted area of 960 ha (2,400 acres) and is represented by at least four wineries.

== Extent and appellation ==
The Currency Creek wine region is one of five wine zones forming the Fleurieu zone which located to the immediate south of Adelaide city centre in South Australia. The Currency Creek wine region extends from Milang on the shore of Lake Alexandrina in the north east, to the Murray Mouth in the south east, Port Elliot in the south west and just south of Ashbourne in the north west. The wine region includes vineyards on Hindmarsh Island. The term ‘Currency Creek’ was registered as an AGI on 9 April 2001.

== Grapes and wine ==
As of 2014, the most common plantings in the Currency Creek wine region within a total planted area of 960 ha (2,400 acres) was reported as being Shiraz (34%) followed by Cabernet Sauvignon (30.3%), Chardonnay (12.7%) and Merlot (6.4%). Alternatively, red wine varietals account for 75.4%of plantings while white wines varietals account for 24.4%of plantings. The total 2014 vintage is reported as consisting of 6,075 tonnes (5,979 long tons; 6,697 short tons) of crushed red grapes valued at A$4,876,849and 1,194 tonnes (1,175 long tons; 1,316 short tons) of crushed white grapes valued at A$698,672. As of 2014, the region is reported as having four wineries.

== See also ==
- South Australian wine

== Citations and references ==
=== References ===
- Phylloxera and Grape Industry Board of SA (PGIBSA) (2014), "Australian regional winegrape crush survey online" (PDF), South Australian Winegrape Utilisation and Pricing Surveys, Phylloxera and Grape Industry Board of SA, ISSN 1442-6048, archived from the original (PDF) on 6 November 2014
