= Southern Flinders Ranges =

Wine region in South Australia

Coordinates: 33°01′24″S 138°18′33″E

- Wine region
- Type: Wine Region
- Year established: 2003
- Years of wine industry: Since the 1890s
- Country: Australia
- Part of: Far North zone
- Heat units: 1611 heat degree days from Oct-Apr
- Precipitation (annual average): 556 mm (21.9 inches)
- Varietals produced: Shiraz, Cabernet Sauvignon, Merlot, Riesling
- Comments: Harvest Early Feb-Early Mar

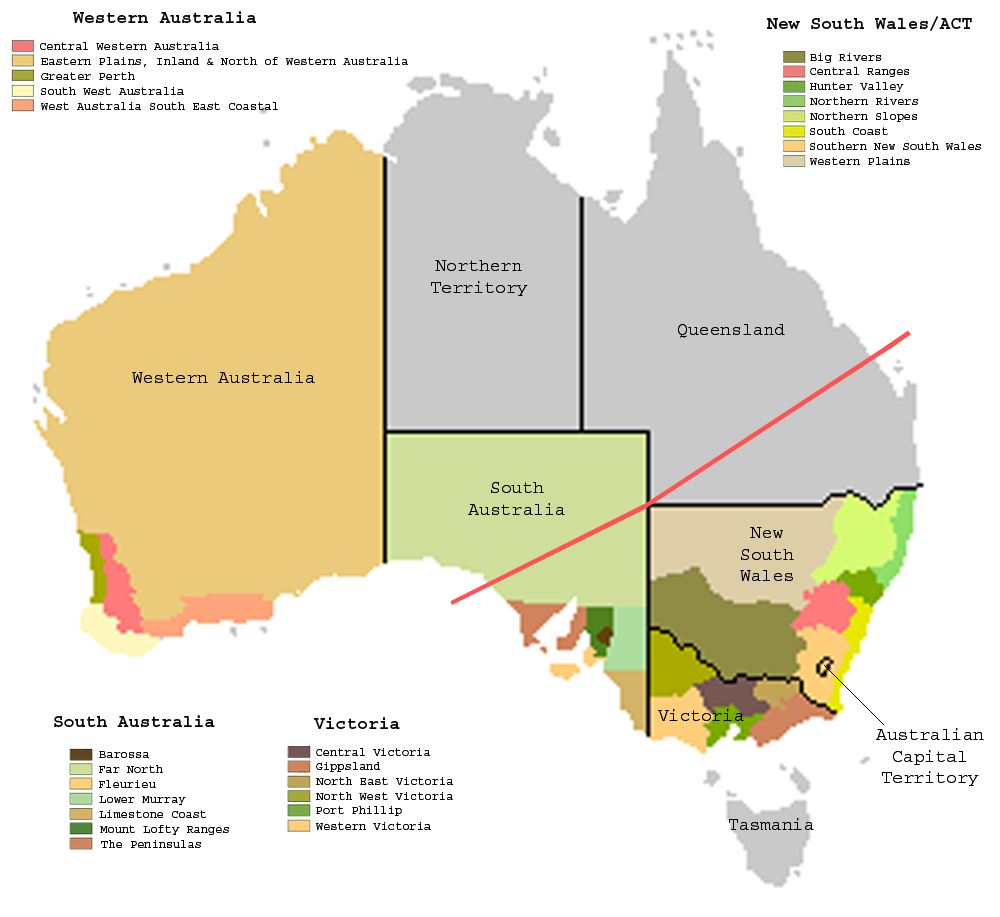
Australian wine zones & regions

Southern Flinders Ranges is a South Australian wine region, located east of Spencer Gulf. It is located to the east and north-east of Port Pirie. Though vines have been planted in the area since the 1890s, the Southern Flinders Ranges is a relatively new wine-growing region that began to emerged during the last 20 years of the 20th century. The term 'Southern Flinders Ranges' was registered as an Australian Geographical Indication under the Wine Australia Corporation Act 1980 on 19 August 2003.

== Climate and geography ==
It shares some geological features with the Clare Valley. Most of Southern Flinders vineyards are located between 40 and 500 metres (131 to 1640 feet) altitude. Despite its northerly situation, the climate of the region can be described as warm and dry, rather than hot, being assisted in its relative mildness by its elevation and the maritime influences of the Spencer Gulf to the south-west and southerly winds from Gulf St Vincent. Located along the Goyder's Line the area receives ample amount of rainfall and tends to harvest earlier than the neighbouring Clare and Barossa Valleys. Some vineyard still choose to irrigate using underground water sources.

The region is often split into two sub-zones-the Baroota Land System which includes the coastal plains to the west of the Flinders Ranges and the Wild Dog Creek Land System which includes the land to the east of the Ranges. The sub zones are distinct from each other in soil type with the Baroota having alluvial deposit of sandy loam and the Wild Dog Creek section being composed of more stoney-based loam and red clay.

== Grapes and wine ==
While the Southern Flinders Ranges grows a wide range of grape varieties, the area has been very successful in recent years with its Cabernet Sauvignon, Merlot and Shiraz. The majority of the region production has been in red wine varietals. However, the first wine of Southern Flinders to make one of Australia top 100 wines list was a Riesling from the area which captured the honour in 2004.

== See also ==
- South Australian wine
