= List of wineries in South Australia =

Wineries In South Australia

This is a list of wineries in South Australia, arranged in alphabetical order by zone and region.

== Mount Lofty Ranges zone ==
=== Clare Valley wine region ===
- Grosset Wines
- Taylors Wines

== See also ==
- Australian wine
- List of breweries in Australia
- South Australian wine
