= Ethiopian wine =

Wine making in Ethiopia

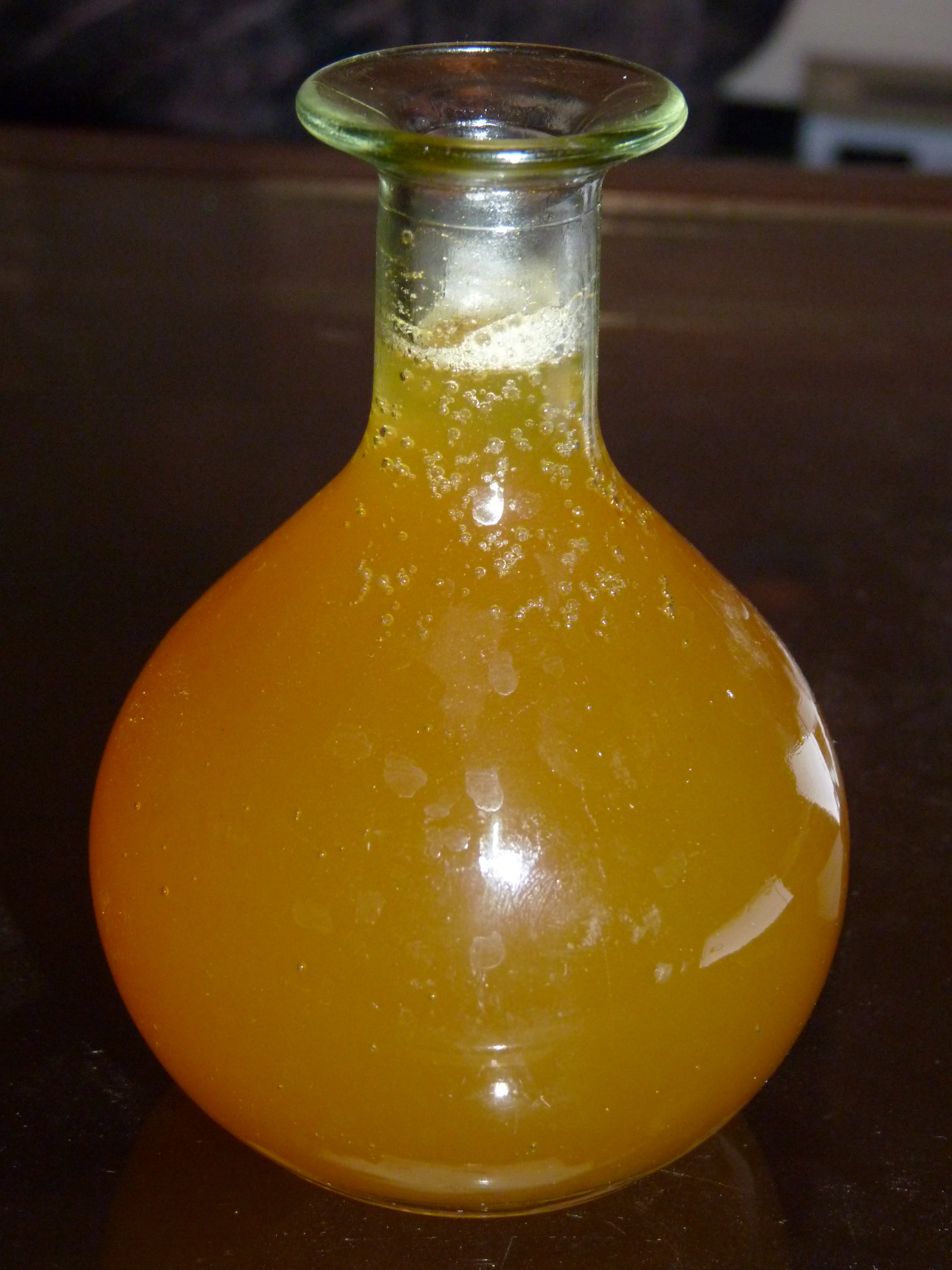
Tej, Ethiopian honey wine

The production of wine in Ethiopia can be traced to the early centuries of the first millennium A.D. The historian Richard Pankhurst observed that early references to Axumite wine can be found in one of the stele erected by the 4th century ruler Ezana. Aksumite viticulture is also attested to by carvings on the base of the great 3rd century obelisk at Axum. The traditional honey wine tej has also long been widely popular.

Contemporary viticulture in Ethiopia dates to 1956, to the establishment of the Awash Winery by entrepreneur Mulugeta Tesfakiros and Ras Mesfin Sileshi. As of 2014 the Awash winery had an annual output of 10 million bottles, most of which is consumed locally. In 2014 the French beverage corporation Castel began producing wines of a number of varieties on a 120-hectare estate near Ziway in the Ethiopian Rift Valley. As of 2013 annual production was 3 million bottles, approximately half of which was exported, mainly to China.

Climatic and geographic conditions in the central portion of its Great Rift Valley make Ethiopia well suited to viticulture. Annual rainfall measures about 650 mm, temperatures average 25 degrees Celsius per year and the region enjoys sandy soils, which are ideal conditions for wine production. Furthermore, due to Ethiopia's proximity to the equator, it is possible to make two harvests per year. The western slopes of the Ethiopian Highlands also enjoy an inland Mediterranean climate, also conducive to wine-growing.

== See also ==
- Winemaking
- Ethiopian cuisine
- African cuisine
- Agriculture in Ethiopia
