= Langhorne Creek wine region =

Wine region in South Australia

Coordinates: 35.29596°S 139.0359°E

Langhorne Creek
- Wine region
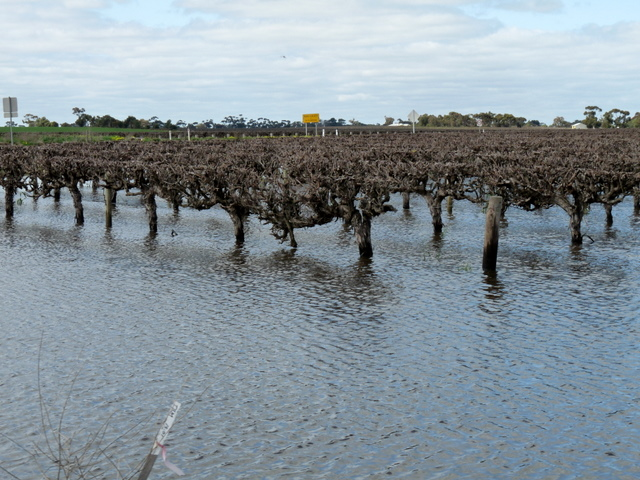
- Flooded vineyards, Langhorne Creek
- Type: Australian Geographical Indication
- Year established: 1998
- Years of wine industry: since 1860
- Country: Australia
- Part of: Fleurieu zone
- Climate region: ‘I’
- Heat units: 1520
- Precipitation (annual average): 140 mm (5.5 in)
- Size of planted vineyards: 5,883 ha (14,540 acres)
- Grapes produced: 48,639 tonnes (47,871 long tons; 53,615 short tons)
- Varietals produced: Shiraz, Cabernet Sauvignon, Chardonnay, Merlot
- No. of wineries: 24
- Comments: climate & production: 2014

Langhorne Creek wine region is a wine region in South Australia that is located on the plains southeast of the town of Strathalbyn along the lower reaches of the Bremer River and Angas River to Lake Alexandrina. The region received appellation as an Australian Geographical Indication (AGI) in 1998 and as of 2014, has a total planted area of 5,883 ha (14,540 acres) and is represented by at least 24 wineries.

== Extent and appellation ==
The Langhorne Creek wine region is one of five wine regions forming the Fleurieu zone which is located to the south of Adelaide city centre in South Australia. The Langhorne Creek wine region extends southeast of the town of Strathalbyn along the Bremer River and Angas River to Lake Alexandrina, centred on the town of Langhorne Creek. The term Langhorne Creek was registered as an AGI on 16 October 1998.

== Grapes and wine ==
As of 2014, the most common plantings in the Langhorne Creek wine region within a total planted area of 5,883 ha (14,540 acres) was reported as being Shiraz (36.7%) followed by Cabernet Sauvignon (31.6%), Chardonnay (10.6%) and Merlot (6.5%). Alternatively, red wine varietals account for 82.1% of plantings while white wines varietals account for 17%of plantings. The total 2014 vintage is reported as consisting of 39,844 tonnes (39,215 long tons; 43,920 short tons) of crushed red grapes valued at A$32,351,720 and 8,795 tonnes (8,656 long tons; 9,695 short tons) of crushed white grapes valued at A$4,835,751. As of 2014, the region is reported as having 24 wineries.

== See also ==
- South Australian wine

== Citations and references ==
=== References ===
- Phylloxera and Grape Industry Board of SA (PGIBSA) (2014), "Australian regional winegrape crush survey online" (PDF), South Australian Winegrape Utilisation and Pricing Surveys, Phylloxera and Grape Industry Board of SA, ISSN 1442-6048, archived from the original (PDF) on 6 November 2014
