= The Peninsulas zone (wine) =

Wine growing zone in South Australia

- Wine region
- Type: Australian Geographical Indication
- Year established: 1996.
- Country: Australia
- Part of: South Australia
- Heat units: 1655
- Precipitation (annual average): 161 mm (6.3 in)
- Size of planted vineyards: 77 ha (190 acres)
- Grapes produced: 249 tonnes (245 long tons; 274 short tons)
- Varietals produced: Cabernet Sauvignon & Shiraz
- No. of wineries: at least 3
- Comments: 2014

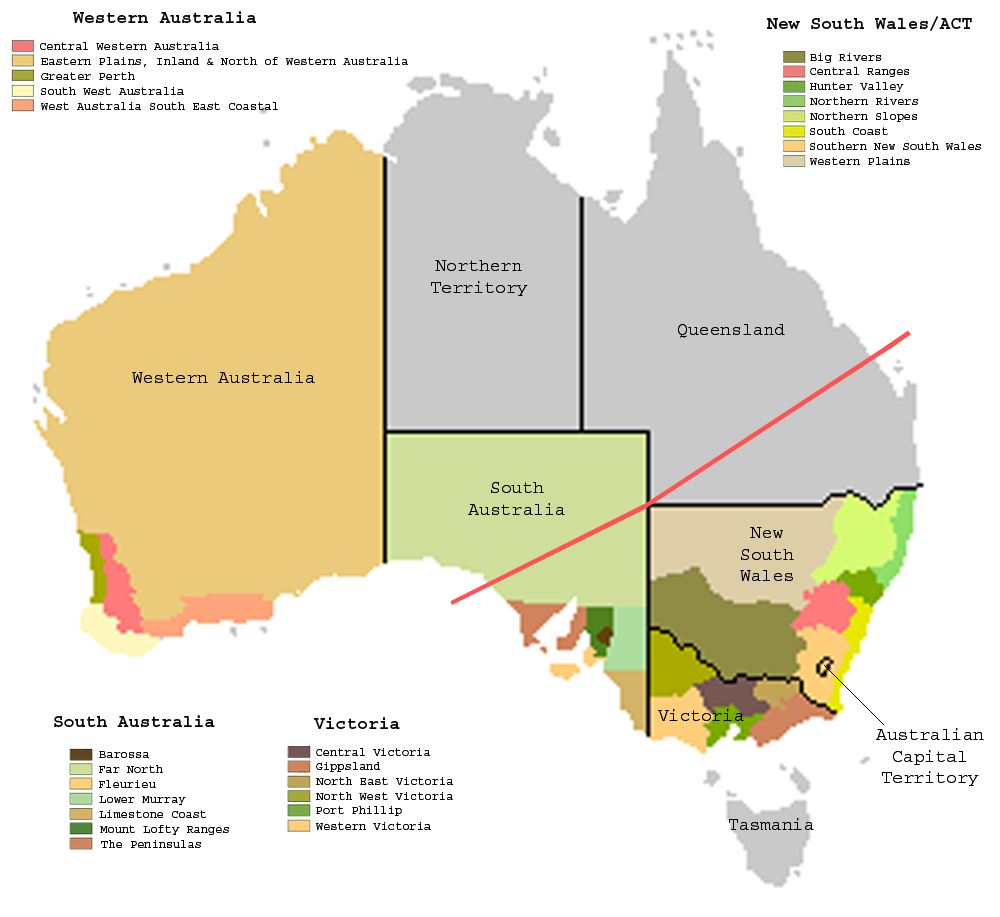
Australian wine zones & regions

The Peninsulas zone is a wine zone located in South Australia that covers the entire Yorke Peninsula, an adjoining portion of the Mid North of South Australia, the portion of Eyre Peninsula south of a line of latitude approximately in line with Crystal Brook and the islands located off the adjoining coastline. The zone is bounded by the Far North zone to its north by the Mount Lofty Ranges zone to its east. The term ‘The Peninsulas’ was registered as an Australian Geographical Indication under the Wine Australia Corporation Act 1980 on 27 December 1996.

As of 2017, the zone does not have any constituent regions, although the locality around the regional city of Port Lincoln, while not officially recognised, is informally known as the ‘Southern Eyre Peninsula region’. As of 2017, Halliday reports that there are three wineries in the ‘Southern Eyre Peninsula region’, and one on Yorke Peninsula. As of 2014, the most common plantings in The Peninsulas wine region within a total planted area of 77 ha (190 acres) were reported as being Cabernet Sauvignon (16.9%) and Shiraz (16.9%). Alternatively, the plantings when categorised by varietals are red (37.7%), white (13%) and ‘unknown’ (48.1%). The quantity of wine grape harvested in 2014 was reported as being 249 t (245 long tons; 274 short tons).

== See also ==
- South Australian wine

== Citations and references ==
=== References ===
- Halliday, James (23 October 2012), James Halliday Australian wine companion : the bestselling and definitive guide to Australian wine (2013 ed.), Richmond, Vic. Hardie Grant Books (published 2012), ISBN 978-1-74270-306-0
- Phylloxera and Grape Industry Board of SA (PGIBSA) (2014), "Australian regional winegrape crush survey online" (PDF), South Australian Winegrape Utilisation and Pricing Surveys, Phylloxera and Grape Industry Board of SA, ISSN 1442-6048, archived from the original (PDF) on 6 November 2014
