= 50th parallel =

50th parallel may refer to:

- 50th parallel north, a circle of latitude in the Northern Hemisphere
- 50th parallel south, a circle of latitude in the Southern Hemisphere
