= Fleurieu zone =

Wine zone in South Australia

- Wine region
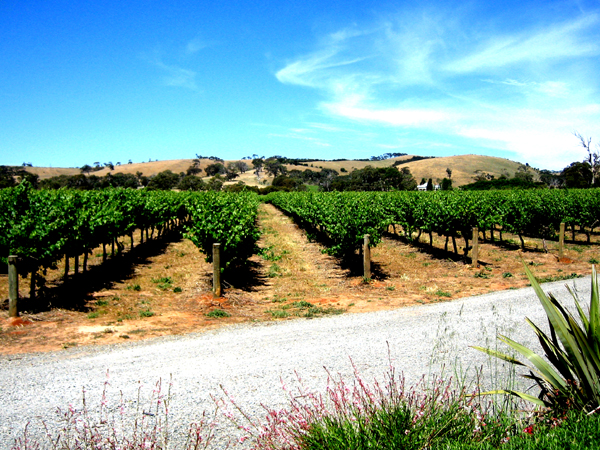
- Vineyard in the McLaren Vale region
- Type: Geographical indication zone
- Year established: 1996
- Country: Australia
- Part of: South Australia
- Sub-regions: Currency Creek; Kangaroo Island; Langhorne Creek; McLaren Vale; Southern Fleurieu
- Growing season: October–April

Fleurieu zone is a wine zone located south of Adelaide in South Australia. It extends from Kangaroo Island in the west as far north as Flagstaff Hill on the west side of the Mount Lofty Ranges and to as far north as Langhorne Creek on the east side of the Mount Lofty Ranges. It consists of the following five wine regions, each of which has received appellation as an Australian Geographical Indication (AGI): Currency Creek, Kangaroo Island, Langhorne Creek, McLaren Vale and the Southern Fleurieu.

== Extent and appellation ==
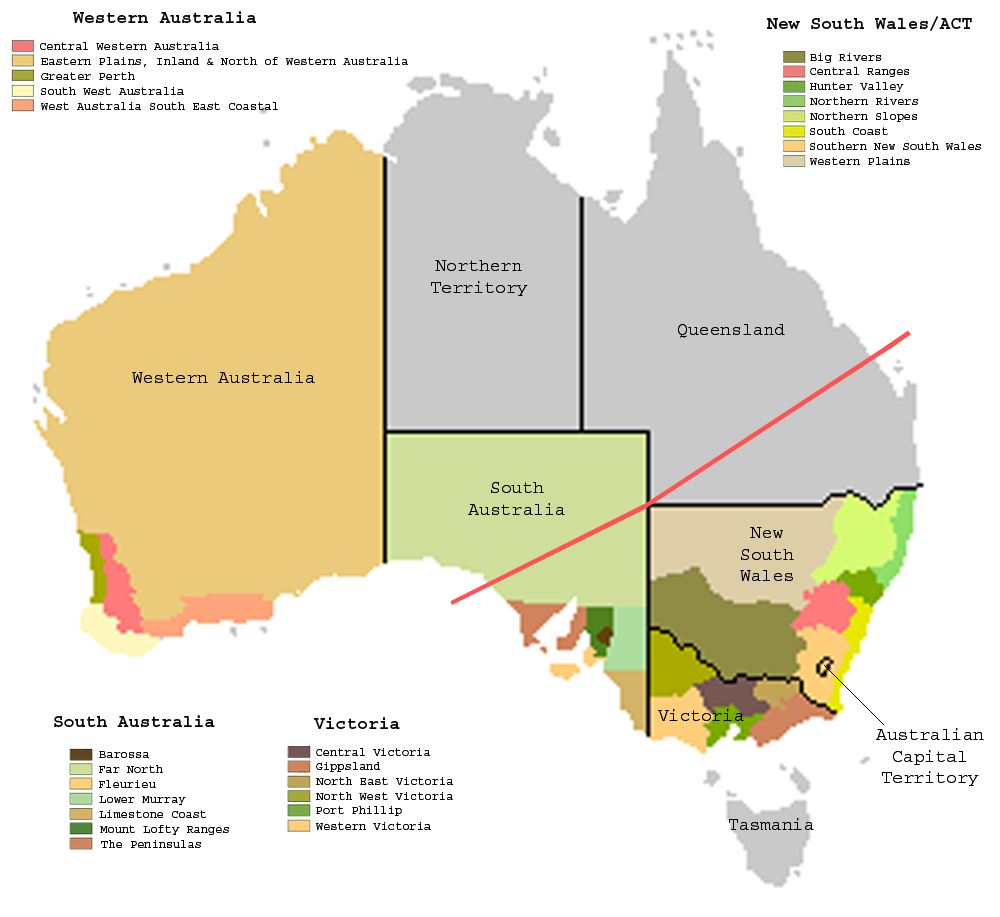
Australian wine zones & regions

The Fleurieu zone includes the following areas south of Adelaide - Kangaroo Island, the Fleurieu Peninsula, the strip of coast on west side of the Mount Lofty Ranges extending into the southern Adelaide metropolitan area and the strip of land on the western shore of Lake Alexandrina including the town of Langhorne Creek and the following islands within the lake - Hindmarsh, Mundoo, and Long. The term 'Fleurieu' was registered as an AGI under the Wine Australia Corporation Act 1980 on 27 December 1996.

== Constituent regions ==
The wine zone includes the following wine regions - Currency Creek, Kangaroo Island, Langhorne Creek, McLaren Vale and the Southern Fleurieu.

=== Currency Creek wine region ===
The Currency Creek wine region is located on the west side of Lake Alexandrina between Milang, the Murray Mouth, Port Elliot and just south of Ashbourne including the town of Currency Creek. Chardonnay, Riesling, Sauvignon blanc and Semillon grow here, though the region also produces some notable red wines. The term 'Currency Creek' was registered as an AGI on 9 April 2001. As of 2012, the region contains at least two wineries.

=== Kangaroo Island wine region ===
The Kangaroo Island wine region which covers the full extent of the island of the same name is known for its Bordeaux style wines. Most of the vineyards are found on the ironstone and sandy loam soils near Kingscote. The term 'Kangaroo Island' was registered as an AGI on 8 December 2000. As of 2012, the region contains at least seven wineries.

=== Langhorne Creek wine region ===
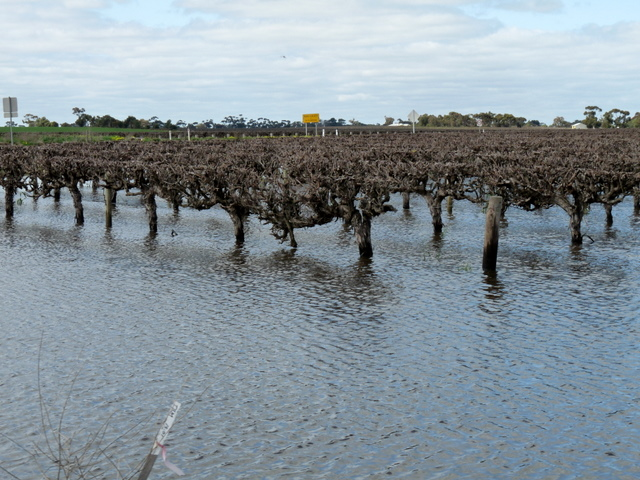
Flooded vineyards, Langhorne Creek

The Langhorne Creek wine region is located southeast from the town of Strathalbyn along the Bremer River to Lake Alexandrina. Orlando Wines sources many of the grapes for its Jacob's Creek brand from this region which has also developed a reputation of its dessert wines. The term 'Langhorne Creek' was registered as an AGI on 16 October 1998. As of 2012, the region contains at least 17 wineries.

=== McLaren Vale wine region ===
The McLaren Vale wine region is located south of Adelaide and extends from Flagstaff Hill in the north to Kangarilla in the east and to Sellicks Beach in the south. With the area's 56 centimetres (22 inches) of rain, and diversity of soil types including sand, clay and limestone, this area produces a wide range of wines with Shiraz, Cabernet Sauvignon, Merlot, Chardonnay, Semillon and Sauvignon blanc being the most widely planted. The term 'McLaren Vale' was registered as an AGI on 2 September 1997. As of 2012, the region contains at least 82 wineries.

=== Southern Fleurieu wine region ===
The Southern Fleurieu region is located on the Fleurieu Peninsula and the portion of the Mount Lofty Ranges extending north east from the peninsula to Willunga in the west and Ashbourne in the east. The area's sandy loam and gravel based ironstone soil supports Cabernet Sauvignon, Malbec, Riesling and Viognier plantings. Shiraz, Sauvignon blanc, Merlot and Primitivo are also planted at Nangkita near Mount Compass. The term 'Southern Fleurieu' was registered as an AGI on 6 June 2001. As of 2012, the region contains at least five wineries.

== See also ==
- List of wineries in McLaren Vale
- South Australian wine

== Citations and references ==
=== References ===
- Halliday, James (7 April 2009), Australian wine companion (2009 ed.), Collins (published 2008), ISBN 978-1-74066-647-3
- Halliday, James (2 February 2010), James Halliday Australian wine companion 2010 (2010 ed.), Hardie Grant Books (published 2009), ISBN 978-1-74066-754-8
- Halliday, James (23 October 2012), James Halliday Australian wine companion : the bestselling and definitive guide to Australian wine (2013 ed.), Richmond, Vic. Hardie Grant Books (published 2012), ISBN 978-1-74270-306-0
- Stevenson, Tom; Stevenson, Tom. New Sotheby's wine encyclopedia; Sotheby's (Firm) (2005), The Sotheby's wine encyclopedia (4th ed.), DK, ISBN 0-75661-324-8
