= McLaren Vale =

Wine region in South Australia

Coordinates: 35.219437°S 138.543615°E

- Wine region
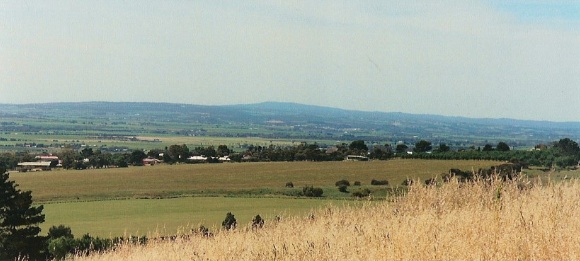
- Type: Australian Geographical Indication
- Year established: 1997
- Country: Australia
- Part of: Fleurieu zone
- Heat units: 1525
- Precipitation (annual average): 180 mm (7.1 in)
- Soil conditions: Wide range of soils but red/brown loamy sand quite common. Sandy soils on hillsides around Blewitt Springs. Some areas with terra rossa
- No. of vineyards: 7,438 Hectares
- Grapes produced: Cabernet Sauvignon, Chardonnay, Grenache, Shiraz
- No. of wineries: at least 120

McLaren Vale is a wine region in the Australian state of South Australia located in the Adelaide metropolitan area and centred on the town of McLaren Vale about 38 kilometres (24 mi) south of the Adelaide city centre. It is internationally renowned for the wines it produces and is included within the Great Wine Capitals of the World. The region was named after either David McLaren, the Colonial Manager of the South Australia Company or John McLaren (unrelated) who surveyed the area in 1839. Among the first settlers to the region in late 1839, were two English farmers from Devon, William Colton and Charles Thomas Hewett. William Colton established the Daringa Farm and Charles Thomas Hewett established Oxenberry Farm. Both men would be prominent in the early days of McLaren Vale. Although initially the region's main economic activity was the growing of cereal crops, John Reynell and Thomas Hardy planted grape vines in 1838 and the present-day Seaview and Hardy wineries were in operation as early as 1850. Grapes were first planted in the region in 1838 and some vines more than 100 years old are still producing.

== Geography ==
The wine region, which is located within the southern end of the Adelaide metropolitan area, runs 30km down the coastline of the Gulf St Vincent in the west and stretches to the foothills of the Mount Lofty Ranges in the east. Its northern boundary commences at the coastline in the suburb of Hallett Cove and finishes in the foothills in the suburb of Chandlers Hill. It is located mainly within the local government area of the City of Onkaparinga with part of its northern end being in the local government area of the City of Marion.

== Climate ==
The McLaren Vale wine region has a Mediterranean climate with four clear seasons. With a dry and warm summer, the area typically has dry weather from December through to March or April, giving an easy change between summer and winter. The climate is gentle with long, warm days and short, cool nights. Winter rains of 580–700 mm per annum flow into a fresh spring. It rarely experiences frost or drought due to its close proximity to the sea.

== Wines ==
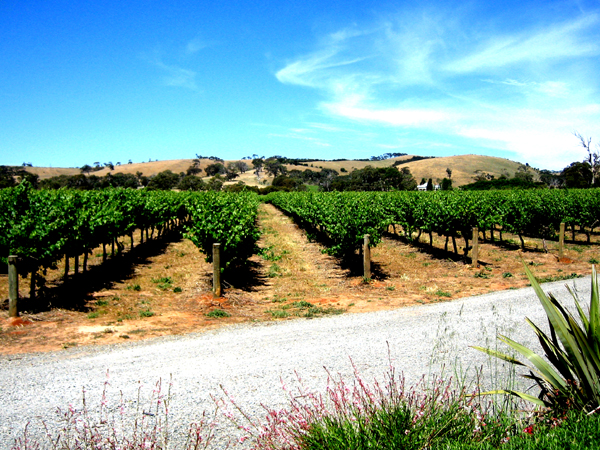
McLaren Vale vineyard

The McLaren Vale wine region is well known for its dry red wines, especially those made from Shiraz, Cabernet Sauvignon and Grenache grapes. A range of climate appropriate Mediterranean grape varieties including Mourvedre, Tempranillo, Nero d'Avola and Sangiovese are increasingly being grown. White wine varieties in the wine region include Fiano, Vermentino, Grenache blanc, Roussanne and other such Mediterranean varieties.

Notable for producing premium Shiraz, the grape is by far the most important variety for the wine region, accounting for about 60% of the total crush. The area's unique geographical features allow for the production of high quality wine. McLaren Vale region has 3218 hectares of Shiraz. Other major varieties include Cabernet Sauvignon with 1288 hectares planted, Chardonnay with 722 hectares planted, and Grenache with 402 hectares—much of this dry-grown (non-irrigated) bush vines. (Statistics taken from the Phylloxera and Grape Industry Board's vineyard register as of May 2005.)

- Shiraz is harvested from late February to early April. McLaren Vale Shiraz displays pronounced berry and spice characters with some dark chocolate and liquorice, while Shiraz from cooler sub-regions exhibits defined ripe raspberry characters. McLaren Vale Shiraz is renowned for its great softness and rolling palate. Many winemakers within the wine region choose to blend their final Shiraz from a variety of sub-regions to add complexity. The wine region naturally produces Shiraz that has very small berries. Smaller berries have a higher skin to pulp ratio. Berry skin contains flavanols (Anti-sunburn in grapes, 'flavour' in wine), Anthocyanins (colour) and other complex molecules that add to wine complexity. Grape pulp contains sugar and water. Therefore, the more skin to less pulp the more complex the finished wine. Small berries make more intense Shiraz wine. The wine region has a diversity of soil types, clones and winemaking philosophies, which has led to a huge range of Shiraz wine styles being produced. Most winemakers produce at least one Shiraz wine.
- Cabernet Sauvignon is harvested in late March.
- Grenache is harvested in late April. It is the ancient type of vine widely planted in France and Spain. It is the backbone of many of the world's red and fortified wines. Grenache vines were removed from the wine region in the 1980s when demand for fortified wines fell. Since the late 1990s Grenache has been enjoying a resurgence of popularity as table wine. The wine region's soils are particularly suited to this variety. However, in wet years it can be difficult to grow well as it can produce big bunches of grapes which make a less concentrated wine. In the best vintages Grenache displays nuances of plum, mulberry and tobacco leaf, spice and mint characters with earthy overtones.
- Chardonnay is harvested in mid March. This is the major white variety in the wine region. The most pronounced and distinctive feature is ripe peaches, with the wine from cooler sites displaying white peach. These wines maintain elegance and generally have long cellaring potential. Some McLaren Vale Chardonnay also features ripe melon, banana, fig and cashew nut flavours—rich and generous with pure elegance.
- Sauvignon blanc is harvested in early March. Sauvignon blanc from McLaren Vale has distinctive varietal characters of tropical fruit, green olives and asparagus, and a full-flavoured palate with a clean, fresh acid finish. Sauvignon blanc grown in the wine region reaches relatively high sugar levels compared with other wine regions growing this variety. The variety shows herbaceous, gooseberry, passion fruit and lychee aromas.
- Petit Verdot is one of Bordeaux's classic red grape varieties. It is a very thick-skinned grape that produces a wine of considerable depth, peppery, spicy and fragrant. Geoff Johnston of Pirramimma planted the first Australian plot at McLaren Vale in 1983 and it is only now that this wine is being recognised elsewhere. Demand for cuttings of this variety has expanded rapidly and more wines will be presented to the market in the future. Petit Verdot grapes produce wine that has the colour intensity and spice of Shiraz, but with added fragrance of violets, which makes the nose very attractive.
- Sangiovese is an Italian variety that does well in low fertility soils and a warm dry climate. It is slow to ripen and produces wine high in acid and tannin. The wine is deep in colour and aroma, and good for long cellaring. Sangiovese is harvested in the wine region from late March to early April.
- Tempranillo is a Spanish variety that produces a red wine that matures quickly and can be ready for drinking in the year of vintage. In Spain Tempranillo is one of the most popular reds and when blended with Carignan it makes the best red wine of the Rioja region.
- Verdelho is a Portuguese white wine variety that likes low vigour soils and a warm dry climate, Verdelho has been around for some time and is enjoying an increase in popularity. It produces wines that are vivacious, fruit salad-like, dry, and best when drunk young and fresh.
- Viognier is an exotic variety introduced from France where the best wines are produced in the Condrieu region. This variety exhibits exotic aromas of apricot and musk, and light oak and malolactic character; with rose, nectarine and white peach, McLaren Vale Viognier is spicy and complex with a huge spectrum of flavours.
- Zinfandel is a thin-skinned grape that needs dry conditions to avoid rotting. Bunches ripen unevenly, requiring careful picking to ensure the true character is available to be further developed by the winemaker. Zinfandel is spicy in character without being particularly heavy.

== Soil characteristics ==
The McLaren Vale wine region has many different soil types, and this contributes to the wines from the area having different terroir. The vineyards are planted on soils including fertile red-brown earths, terra rossa, rendzina, soft sands and dark cracking clays.

Each of these soil types contributes to the rich diversity of wine produced by the winemakers of the wine region. Overall the soils have one common trait; they are free draining which means they hold very little water. This is, in fact, an advantage, as it allows the accurate control of moisture to the vines through the use of state-of-the-art drip irrigation. Because of reliable winter rain, irrigation can be kept to low levels and manipulated to achieve the production of superior fruit.

Some soil types allow grapes to be dry-grown. Approximately 20% of the total crop is dry-grown. These dry-grown vines are renowned for small fruit size, which is sought after for the intensity of its flavour.

Most vineyards are found on gently undulating land at about 100m above sea level. In the foothills of the Mount Lofty Ranges to the east, where there is a scattering of vineyards, elevation rises to 320 m. At Blewitt Springs elevation is around 200 m. These variations in elevation have a significant impact on the terroir and fruit produced in the vineyards.

== Subregions ==
The McLaren Vale wine region has no recognised subregions, however, some wineries promote their vineyards as being in particular subregions with terroir peculiar to that part of the region. The McLaren Vale Grape Wine and Tourism Association has identified 19 distinct districts based on climate and geology.

== Statutory protection of parts of the wine region ==
In February 2011, South Australian Premier Mike Rann announced that the state government would "look at ways that we can protect the unique identity and integrity of the Barossa Valley and McLaren Vale." Premier Rann said: "Barossa and McLaren Vale food and wine are key icons of South Australia. We must never allow the Barossa or McLaren Vale to become suburbs of Adelaide (sic)."

Legislation to protect the character of the Barossa Valley and McLaren Vale was reported in the media as being passed by the South Australian Parliament in 2012 and came into force in January 2013. The statutory change consisted of an amendment to an existing item of legislation, the Development Act 1993, to create protection districts (also called Character Preservation Districts) within the relevant local government areas to replace the interim protection districts put in place on 11 April 2012. The intention of the amendment is to ensure that the requirements for a protection district will always prevail over other development requirements where there is conflict.

In the case of the McLaren Vale wine region, a character protection district with the name McLaren Vale District was created within the boundaries of the City of Onkaparinga. The character protection district overlays a majority of the land within the local government area. Specifically, this is land not zoned for residential and other urban uses and consists mainly of the eastern side of the local government area extending from the Sturt Creek in the north to parts of the coastal suburbs of Aldinga, Aldinga Beach, Maslin Beach, Port Willunga and Sellicks Beach in the south.

== See also ==
- Australian wine
- Fleurieu zone (wine)
- List of wineries in McLaren Vale
- South Australian wine
