= Growing region =

Geographical area suited for the cultivation of a particular crop

A growing region, also known as a farming region or agricultural region, refers to a geographic area characterised by specific climate factors, soil conditions and agricultural practices that are favourable for the cultivation and production of crops, plants, or livestock. Depending on the environmental characteristics, a growing region can be dominated by a single crop or crop combination. For example, the American Corn Belt, the Philippine coconut landscape and the Malayan rubber landscape are examples of growing regions that are dominated by a particular crop. On the other hand, Queensland and New South Wales of Australia characterised by high inherent soil fertility and high seasonal rainfall have highly diverse crop production including wheat, barley, oilseeds, sorghum maize and wheat.

Most crops are cultivated not in one place only, but in several distinct regions in diverse parts of the world. Cultivation in these areas may be enabled by a large-scale regional climate, or by a unique microclimate.

Growing regions, because of the need for climate consistency, are usually oriented along a general latitude, and in the United States these are often called "belts".

The growing region of a traditional staple crop often has a strong cultural cohesiveness.

== Examples ==
The need for growing fodder has also historically limited livestock to certain agricultural regions.

In Viticulture, American Viticultural Area - AVA regions are a specialized geographic type; and European wine appellations of Protected Geographical Status origin are another.

== See also ==
- List of wine-producing regions
- Geographical indication
- Growing season
- Growing degree-day
