= Yankalilla =

Yankalilla, also spelt Yarnkalyilla, may refer to:

- Yankalilla, South Australia, a locality
- Yankalilla Bay, a bay in South Australia
- Yankalilla Football Club, an Australian rules football club in South Australia
- Yankalilla River, a river whose mouth is at Lady Bay, South Australia
- District Council of Yankalilla, a local government area in South Australia
- Hundred of Yankalilla, a cadastral unit in South Australia

== See also ==
- Shrine of Our Lady of Yankalilla
