= Waitpinga =

Waitpinga may refer to:

- Hundred of Waitpinga, a cadastral unit in South Australia
- Waitpinga, South Australia, a locality
- Waitpinga Conservation Park, a protected area in South Australia
