= County of Hindmarsh =

Hindmarsh
- Cadastral division
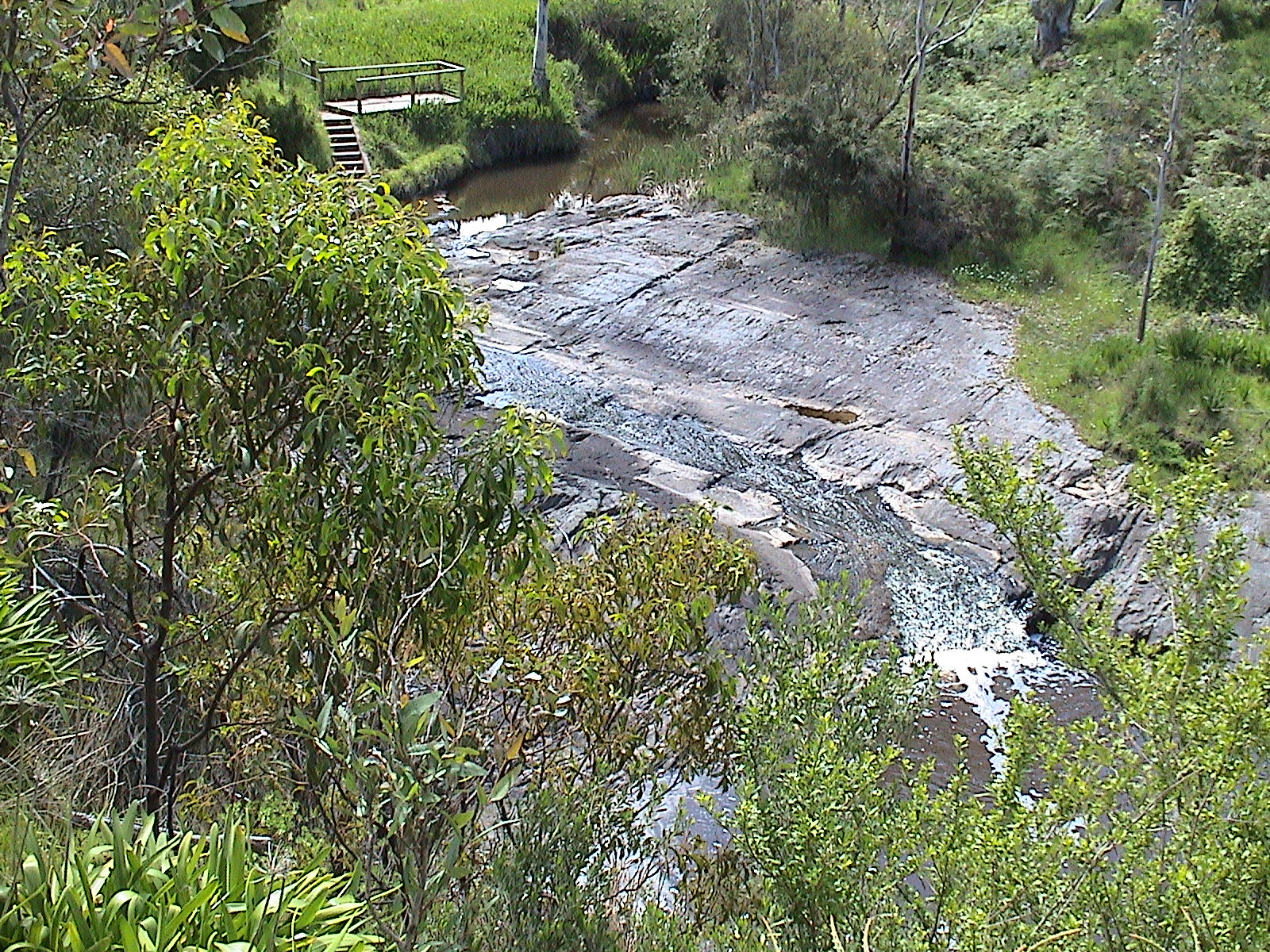
- Glacier "Selwyn" Rock formation beside the Inman River at Inman Valley in the Hundred of Encounter Bay

- Coordinates: 35.43°S 138.64°E
- Country: Australia
- State: South Australia
- Region: Fleurieu and Kangaroo Island; Adelaide Hills (part)
- LGA: Alexandrina Council Mount Barker District Council City of Victor Harbor Yankallilla District Council
- Established: 1842

Area
  - Total: 2,650 km^{2} (1,025 sq mi)
Lands administrative divisions around Hindmarsh
Gulf St Vincent	Adelaide	Sturt
Gulf St Vincent	Hindmarsh	Sturt
Carnarvon	Ocean	Russell
- Coordinates; Local government areas Adjoining counties

The County of Hindmarsh is one of the 49 cadastral counties of South Australia. It was proclaimed by Governor George Grey in 1842 and named for Governor John Hindmarsh.

== Description ==
It extends from the Fleurieu Peninsula in the southwest to the Murray Mouth in the southeast to Point Sturt on the Sturt Peninsula and the course of the Bremer River in the east, Mount Barker in the north and Sellicks Hill on the Gulf St Vincent coastline in the northwest including the southern end of Mt Lofty Ranges, Hindmarsh Island, Mundoo Island and part of Lake Alexandrina. This includes the following contemporary local government areas:

- District Council of Yankalilla
- Victor Harbor City
- Alexandrina Council (excluding small portions on west and east flanks)
- District Council of Mount Barker (central third including the Mount Barker township)

== History ==
The following hundreds have been proclaimed within the county – Encounter Bay, Goolwa, Kondoparinga, Macclesfield, Myponga, Nangkita, Waitpinga and Yankalilla in 1846, Strathalbyn in 1850, and Alexandrina and Bremer in 1851.

== Hundreds ==
The County of Hindmarsh is divided into the following hundreds:

=== Hundred of Alexandrina ===
The Hundred of Alexandrina (35°27′06″S 138°57′07″E) was proclaimed on 7 August 1851. It covers an area of 200 square kilometres (76 sq mi) and is named after the lake partially located within the county and which is known as Lake Alexandrina. It includes the following localities – Clayton Bay, Point Sturt and parts of Finniss, Lake Alexandrina and Milang.

=== Hundred of Bremer ===
The Hundred of Bremer (35°21′07″S 138°57′09″E) was proclaimed on 7 August 1851. It covers an area of 240 square kilometres (92 sq mi) and is named after the British naval officer, Sir J Gordon Bremer. It includes the following localities – Nurragi, Willyaroo and parts of Belvidere, Finniss, Langhorne Creek, Lake Plains, Lake Alexandrina, Milang, Sandergrove and Strathalbyn.

=== Hundred of Encounter Bay ===
The Hundred of Encounter Bay (35°29′46″S 138°31′48″E) was proclaimed on 29 October 1846. It covers an area of 240 square kilometres (94 sq mi) and is named after the bay which it overlooks on its south-east boundary. It includes the following localities – Back Valley, Hindmarsh Tiers, Lower Inman Valley and Victor Harbor and parts of Encounter Bay, Hindmarsh Valley, Inman Valley and Waitpinga.

=== Hundred of Goolwa ===
The Hundred of Goolwa (35°27′52″S 138°40′59″E) was proclaimed on 29 October 1846. It covers an area of 240 square kilometres (94 sq mi) and is named after the lake partially located within the county and whose name is reported as being derived from an aboriginal word meaning "the elbow". It contains the following localities – Goolwa, Goolwa Beach, Goolwa North, Hayborough, McCracken, Middleton, Mosquito Hill and Port Elliot and parts of Currency Creek, Goolwa South, Hindmarsh Valley, Mount Jagged and Tooperang.

=== Hundred of Kondoparinga ===
The Hundred of Kondoparinga was proclaimed in 1846 and covers 210 km^{2} (80 sq mi). It includes the localities of Ashbourne, Bull Creek, part of Finniss, McHarg Creek, Meadows, Mount Magnificent, Mount Observation, Nangkita, Paris Creek, Prospect Hill, Sandergrove, and part of Strathalbyn.

=== Hundred of Macclesfield ===
The Hundred of Macclesfield was proclaimed in 1846 and covers 180 km^{2} (70 sq mi). The main towns in the hundred are Mount Barker, Littlehampton and Macclesfield. It also includes the localities of Blakiston, Bugle Ranges, Flaxley, Green Hills Range, Mount Barker Junction, Mount Barker Springs, Mount Barker Summit and Totness.

=== Hundred of Myponga ===
The Hundred of Myponga (35°22′46″S 138°30′08″E) was proclaimed on 29 October 1846. It covers an area of 250 square kilometres (96 sq mi) and whose name is derived from an aboriginal word "Maippunga, which in one source is stated to mean "divorced wife" while in another is stated to mean "standing water". It contains the following localities – Myponga, Myponga Beach, Pages Flat, Wattle Flat and parts of Carrickalinga, Hope Forest, Mount Compass, Mount Magnificent, Sellicks Hill, Willunga Hill, Yankalilla and Yundi.

=== Hundred of Nangkita ===
The Hundred of Nangkita (35°27′06″S 138°57′07″E) was proclaimed on 29 October 1846. It covers an area of 300 square kilometres (117 sq mi) and its name is derived from an aboriginal word meaning "place of little frogs". It contains the following localities – Hindmarsh Island, Mundoo Island and parts of Currency Creek, Finniss, Goolwa South, Mount Compass, Mount Observation, Mount Jagged, Nangkita and Tooperang.

=== Hundred of Strathalbyn ===
The Hundred of Strathalbyn was proclaimed in 1850 and covers an area of 210 square kilometres (83 sq mi) immediately west of the Bremer River. The main towns within the hundred are Strathalbyn, Woodchester and Langhorne Creek. It also includes the localities of Bletchley, Belvidere, Gemells, Highland Valley, Red Creek, Salem and Wistow.

=== Hundred of Waitpinga ===
The Hundred of Waitpinga (35°35′40″S 138°22′30″E) was proclaimed on 29 October 1846. It covers an area of 320 square kilometres (123 sq mi) and is reportedly named after an aboriginal word, "Waitpiinga" meaning "the windy place". It includes the following localities – Deep Creek and Tunkalilla and parts of Cape Jervis, Delamere, Parawa, Silverton, Waitpinga and Willow Creek.

=== Hundred of Yankalilla ===
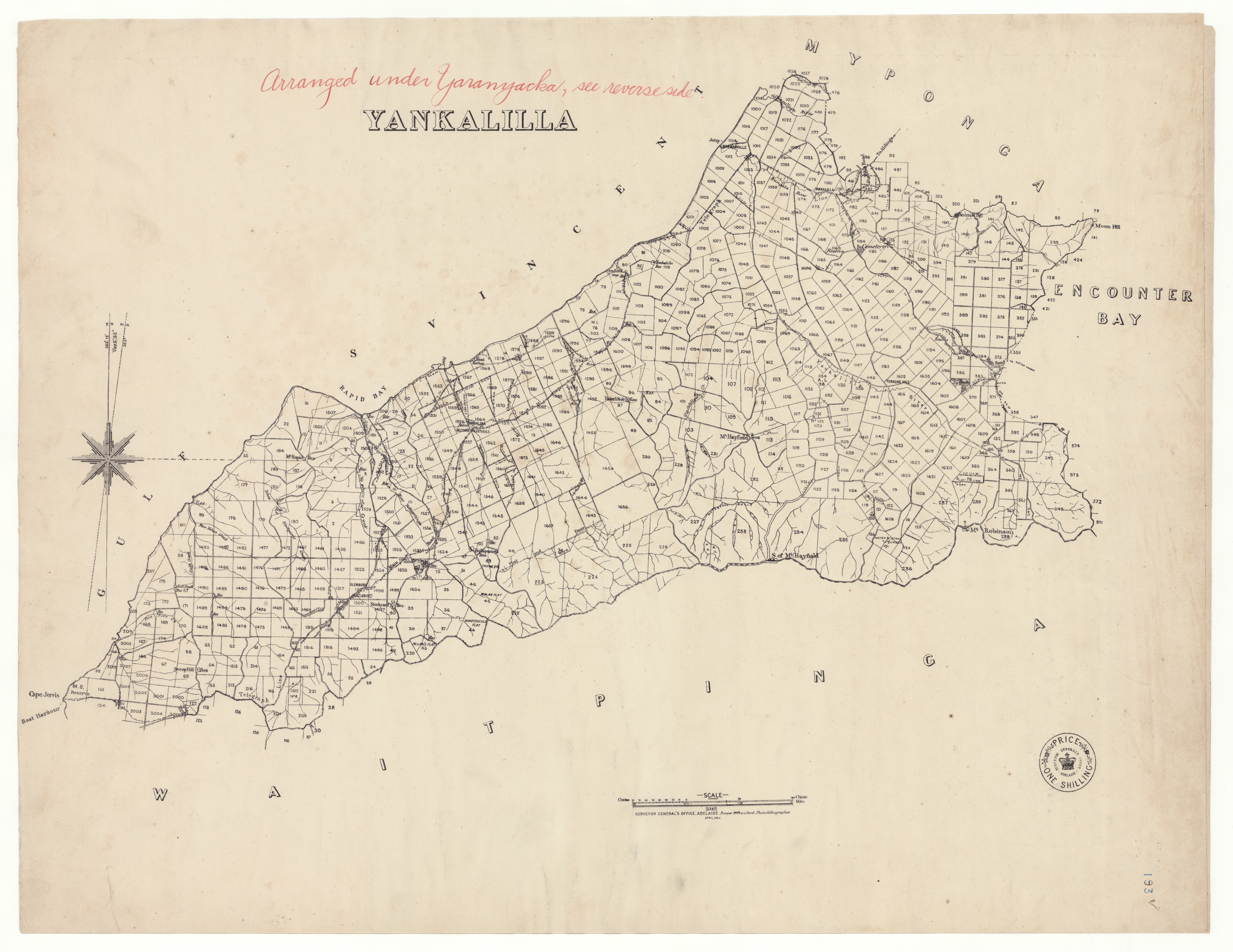
File:Hundred of Yankalilla,1884

The Hundred of Yankalilla (35°31′38″S 138°16′37″E) was proclaimed on 29 October 1846. Its name is reported as being derived as follows by Professor N.B. Tindale:

It is derived from the Aboriginal word jankalan, meaning "falling", from an incident in the myth of Tjilbruke, whose sister's [sic] mummified body began to fall into pieces here, as he was carrying it from Brighton to Cape Jervis for burial.

The hundred includes the following localities – Bald Hills, Hay Flat, Normanville, Rapid Bay, Second Valley, Torrens Vale, Wirrina Cove and parts of Cape Jervis, Carrickalinga, Delamere, Inman Valley, Parawa, Silverton, Willow Creek and Yankalilla.

The town of Yankalilla was laid out on sections 1180-81 of the hundred circa 1857.

== See also ==
- Lands administrative divisions of South Australia
