= Cape Jervis =

Cape Jervis South Australia
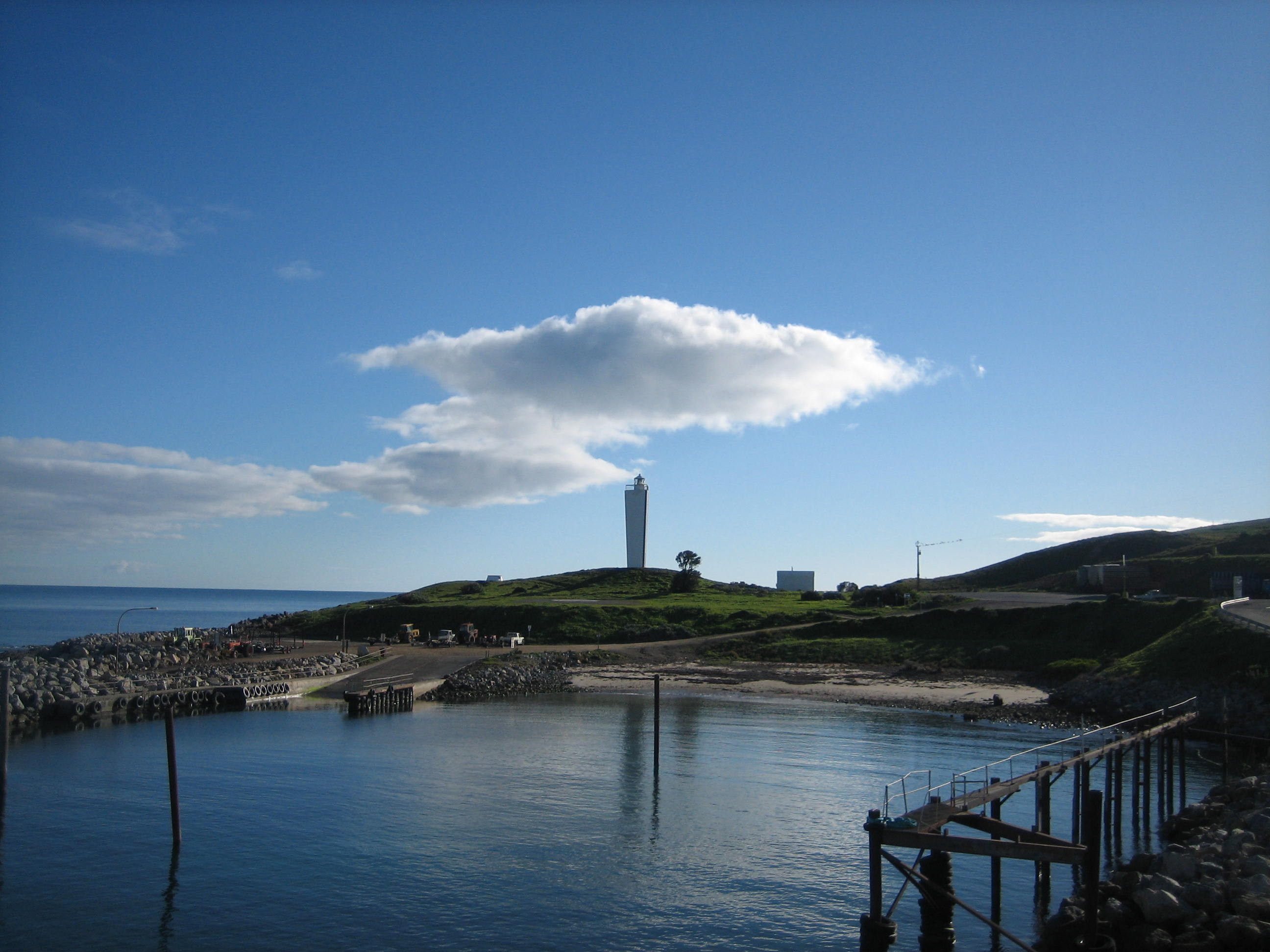
- Sealink Terminal, Cape Jervis

- Coordinates: 35°36′0″S 138°06′0″E
- Population: 264 (2016 census)
- Established: 1954 (sub-division); 5 August 1999 (locality)
- Postcode(s): 5204
- Time zone: ACST (UTC+9:30)
  - Summer (DST): ACST (UTC+10:30)
- Location: 88 km (55 mi) from Adelaide
- LGA(s): District Council of Yankalilla
- Region: Fleurieu and Kangaroo Island
- County: Hindmarsh
- State electorate(s): Mawson
- Federal division(s): Mayo
| Mean max temp | Mean min temp | Annual rainfall |
| 17.5 °C; 64 °F | 10.2 °C; 50 °F | 818.9 mm 32.2 in |
Localities around Cape Jervis:
| Gulf St Vincent | Gulf St Vincent; Rapid Bay | Rapid Bay |
| Gulf St Vincent; Investigator Strait | Cape Jervis | Delamere; Silverton; Deep Creek |
| Investigator Strait | Backstairs Passage | Backstairs Passage |
- Footnotes: Adjoining localities

Cape Jervis is a town in the Australian state of South Australia located near the western tip of Fleurieu Peninsula on the southern end of the Main South Road approximately 88 kilometres (55 mi) south of the state capital of Adelaide.

It is named after the headland (also known by its Aboriginal name Parewarangk) at the western tip of Fleurieu Peninsula which was named by Matthew Flinders after John Jervis, 1st Earl of St Vincent on 23 March 1802.

It overlooks the coastline adjoining the following three bodies of water – Gulf St Vincent, Investigator Strait, and Backstairs Passage. It also overlooks the following facilities both located at the headland of Cape Jervis – the Cape Jervis Lighthouse and the port used by Kangaroo Island SeaLink which operates the ferry service to Penneshaw on Kangaroo Island.

The 2016 Australian census which was conducted in August 2016 reports that Cape Jervis had 264 people living within its boundaries.

Cape Jervis is the starting point for the Heysen Trail, a walking track of 1,200 kilometres (750 mi) in length which finishes at Parachilna Gorge in the Flinders Ranges. Venues of interest to visitors to the town include the Deep Creek Conservation Park, the Talisker Conservation Park and two nearby beaches – Morgan's Beach (with the remains of the trawler Ellen) and Fisheries Beach (with remains of an old whaling station). Cape Jervis is also notable as a point of embarkment for fishing charters.

Cape Jervis is located within the federal division of Mayo, the state electoral district of Mawson and the local government area of the District Council of Yankalilla.
