= Ingalalla Waterfalls =

Waterfall in South Australia

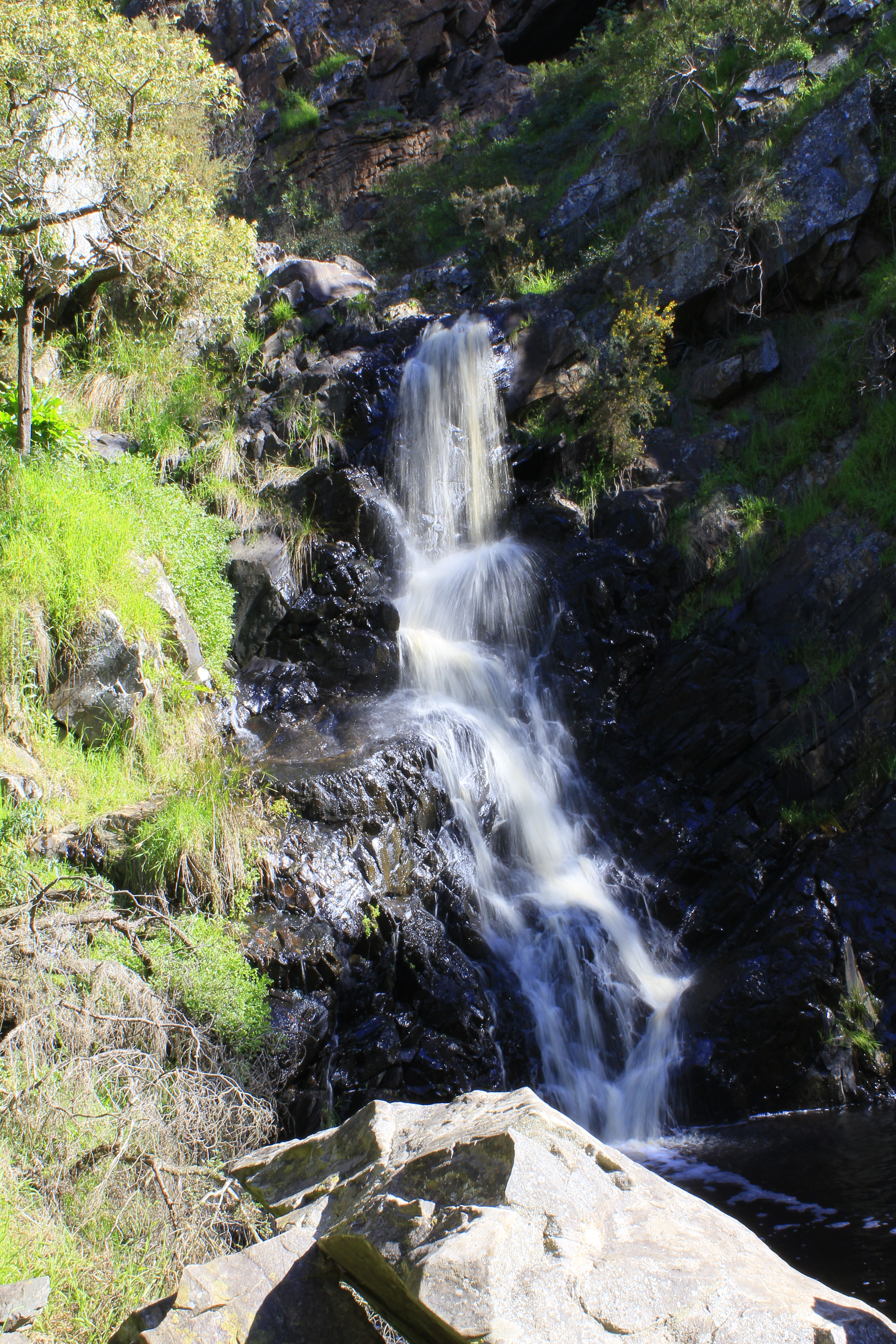

- Location within South Australia
- Location: Fleurieu Peninsula, South Australia
- Coordinates: 35°31′52″S 138°20′34″E
- Type: Cascade
- Elevation: 253 metres (830 ft) AHD
- Total height: 81–92 metres (266–302 ft)

The Ingalalla Waterfalls, also known as Ingalalla Falls, is a cascade waterfall in the Australian state of South Australia, located in the locality of Hay Flat within the District Council of Yankalilla, on an unnamed creek on the Fleurieu Peninsula.

The waterfall is situated approximately 8.3 kilometres (5.2 mi) south of the town of Yankalilla and 70 kilometres (43 mi) south southwest of the state capital of Adelaide, the waterfalls descend from an elevation of 253 metres (830 ft) above sea level in the range of 81–92 metres (266–302 ft) to the Second Valley below. Its name was approved on 25 May 2000 in response to "a request for clarification from the Royal Automobile Association on which name to use for the feature."

There is a strenuous bush walk starting at the waterfall and tracking through parts of the Second Valley Forest, around Mount Hayfield nearby. Mount Hayfield is a significant Aboriginal site due to its connection with the Kaurna Dreaming story of the hero Tjilbruke. Tjilbruke, the creator being of the Kaurna people, is said to have created yellow ochre at this site.

== See also ==
- List of waterfalls
- List of waterfalls in Australia
- List of parks and gardens in rural South Australia
