= Parawa, South Australia =

Parawa South Australia
- Coordinates: 35°33′51″S 138°21′21″E
- Population: 79 (2016 census)
- Established: 1948 (name applied); 5 August 1999 (locality)
- Postcode(s): 5203
- Elevation: 341 m (1,119 ft)(weather station)
- Time zone: ACST (UTC+9:30)
  - Summer (DST): ACST (UTC+10:30)
- Location: 74 km (46 mi) S of Adelaide; 11 km (7 mi) S of Yankalilla
- LGA(s): District Council of Yankalilla
- Region: Fleurieu and Kangaroo Island
- County: Hindmarsh
- State electorate(s): Mawson
- Federal division(s): Mayo
Mean max temp	Mean min temp	Annual rainfall
17.6 °C; 64 °F	10.3 °C; 51 °F	831.2 mm 32.7 in
Suburbs around Parawa:
Second Valley	Hay Flat; Torrens Vale	Torrens Vale; Willow Creek
Second Valley; Delamere	Parawa	Willow Creek
Delamere	Deep Creek; Tunkalilla; Waitpinga	Willow Creek; Waitpinga
- Footnotes: Adjoining localities

Parawa is a locality in the Australian state of South Australia located about 74 kilometres (46 mi) south of the state capital of Adelaide and about 11 kilometres (6.8 mi) south of the municipal seat in Yankalilla.

Parawa consists of land on the ridge of the Mount Lofty Ranges within the Fleurieu Peninsula. Range Road (designated route B37), passes through the locality from east to west along the ridgeline.

Parawa which is the Aboriginal name for the headland known as Cape Jervis was approved by the state's Nomenclature Committee in 1948 in respect to section 332 in the cadastral unit of the Hundred of Waitpinga. Boundaries for the locality were created on 5 August 1999 for the "local established name".

The majority of the land use within the locality is "primary production" while some land at its southern boundary has been given protected area status as the Waitpinga Conservation Park.

The 2016 Australian census which was conducted in August 2016 reports that Parawa had 79 people living within its boundaries.

Parawa is located within the federal division of Mayo, the state electoral district of Mawson and the local government area of the District Council of Yankalilla.

== Climate ==
Parawa has been the site of an official weather station since 1994.

Climate data for Parawa, elevation 341 m (1,119 ft), (1994–2025 normals and extremes)
Month	Jan	Feb	Mar	Apr	May	Jun	Jul	Aug	Sep	Oct	Nov	Dec	Year
Record high °C (°F)	43.5 (110.3)	40.2 (104.4)	38.2 (100.8)	32.9 (91.2)	25.7 (78.3)	21.6 (70.9)	18.7 (65.7)	21.7 (71.1)	27.3 (81.1)	33.6 (92.5)	38.4 (101.1)	40.3 (104.5)	43.5 (110.3)
Mean daily maximum °C (°F)	23.8 (74.8)	23.2 (73.8)	21.3 (70.3)	18.3 (64.9)	14.9 (58.8)	12.4 (54.3)	11.7 (53.1)	12.6 (54.7)	14.7 (58.5)	17.0 (62.6)	19.5 (67.1)	21.8 (71.2)	17.6 (63.7)
Mean daily minimum °C (°F)	13.9 (57.0)	13.9 (57.0)	13.0 (55.4)	11.3 (52.3)	9.6 (49.3)	7.8 (46.0)	7.0 (44.6)	7.1 (44.8)	8.1 (46.6)	9.1 (48.4)	10.7 (51.3)	12.1 (53.8)	10.3 (50.5)
Record low °C (°F)	7.6 (45.7)	7.9 (46.2)	6.3 (43.3)	4.5 (40.1)	1.8 (35.2)	1.4 (34.5)	1.2 (34.2)	2.1 (35.8)	1.7 (35.1)	2.9 (37.2)	4.4 (39.9)	4.9 (40.8)	1.2 (34.2)
Average precipitation mm (inches)	29.0 (1.14)	29.2 (1.15)	32.0 (1.26)	55.4 (2.18)	95.9 (3.78)	126.3 (4.97)	123.5 (4.86)	98.6 (3.88)	77.9 (3.07)	59.4 (2.34)	43.6 (1.72)	35.6 (1.40)	808.3 (31.82)
Average precipitation days (≥ 0.2 mm)	7.5	7.6	10.1	14.0	18.8	19.7	20.3	20.6	17.1	14.3	12.3	10.6	172.9
Average afternoon relative humidity (%)	58	59	61	67	76	82	82	77	73	68	66	60	69
Source: Australian Bureau of Meteorology (humidity 1994–2010)
