= Deep Creek National Park =

Protected area in South Australia

- IUCN category II (national park)
- Location within South Australia
- Location: South Australia, Deep Creek & Delamere
- Nearest city: Cape Jervis
- Coordinates: 35°37′40″S 138°13′19″E
- Area: 44.96 km^{2} (17.36 sq mi)
- Established: 30 September 1971
- Visitors: "25,000-30,000" (Note: Visitor numbers shared with Talisker Conservation Park) (in 1997)
- Governing body: Department for Environment and Water
- Website: Official website

Deep Creek National Park, formerly the Deep Creek Conservation Park, is a protected area in the Australian state of South Australia located on the southern coast of Fleurieu Peninsula in the gazetted localities of Deep Creek and Delamere about 11 kilometres (6.8 miles) east of Cape Jervis.

== History ==
Formerly a conservation park known as Deep Creek Conservation Park, it was renamed Deep Creek National Park upon being proclaimed a national park on 26 November 2021.

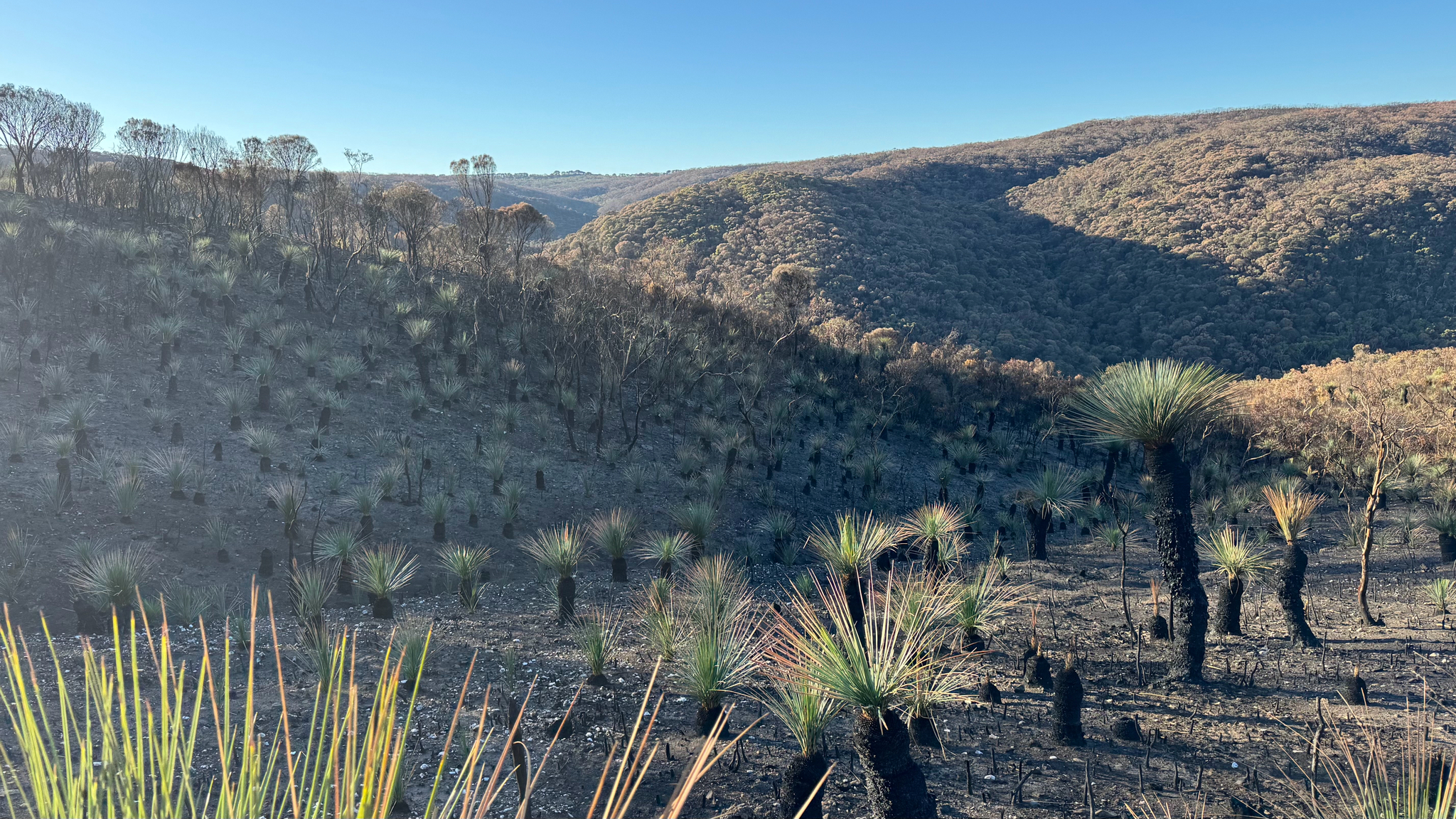
Xanthorrhoea seen thriving within months of the February 2026 fires

On 1 February 2026, a bushfire broke out within the Deep Creek National Park area. By 3 February, over 1,900 hectares had burned, and the weather and ruggedness of the region meant the Country Fire Service (CFS) had significant difficulties controlling the blaze. On 8 February, the CFS declared the bushfire contained, and four days later, declared it controlled. The bushfires burned over 4,500 ha of land, comprising 40% of Deep Creek National Park and 98% of the neighbouring Talisker Conservation Park. Private land was also affected.

== Description ==
The park is the largest portion of remaining natural vegetation on the Fleurieu Peninsula, and is home to much native wildlife, including western grey kangaroos, short-beaked echidnas and around 100 species of birds.

The park encompasses 18 kilometres (11 miles) of coastline, which include views across Backstairs Passage to Kangaroo Island. The conservation park consists of mainly rolling coastal hills, the gullies of which contain orchids and ferns, while the hilltops have stunted scrub and low windswept trees. Walking trails (including part of the famous Heysen Trail) provide access to most of the conservation park.

It is classified as an IUCN class II protected area. In 1980, it was listed on the now-defunct Register of the National Estate.

== Camping ==
The conservation park has five camping areas available with various facilities.

- Stringybark: A sheltered forest setting with 16 sites, hot showers, toilets and rain water. Sites available for caravans and camp trailers. No powered sites available.
- Trig: Central to the main hiking trails, open grassy areas with many well-sheltered and shady sites. 25 sites, toilets and rain water available. Sites available for caravans and camp trailers. No powered sites available.
- Tapanappa: 18 moderately sheltered sites with spectacular coastal views close by. Toilets and rain water available.
- Cobbler Hill: 10 sites with toilets and rain water close to Blowhole Beach. Can be exposed during windy conditions.
- Eagle Waterhole: Located on the Heysen Trail, and only able to be used by hikers. A hikers' hut and rainwater tank have been erected at this site.

== Gallery ==
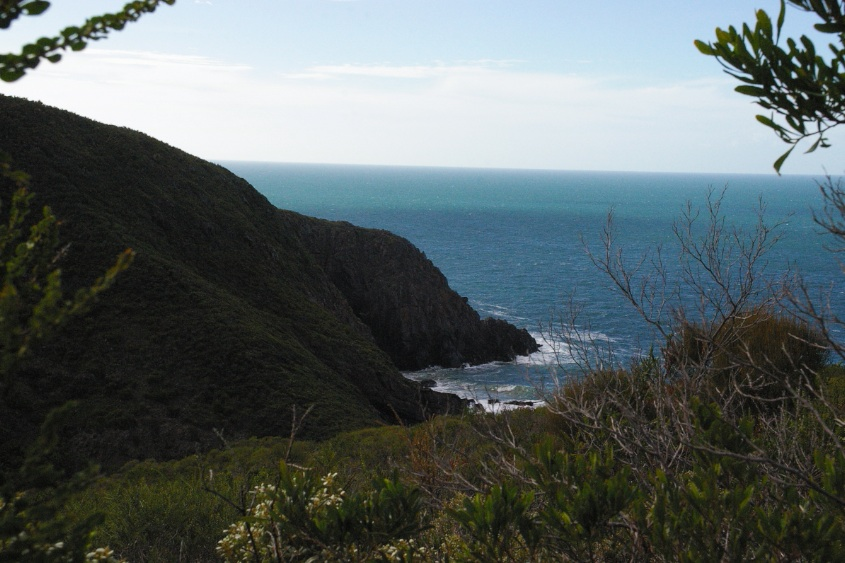
Approaching the cove at the mouth of Deep Creek

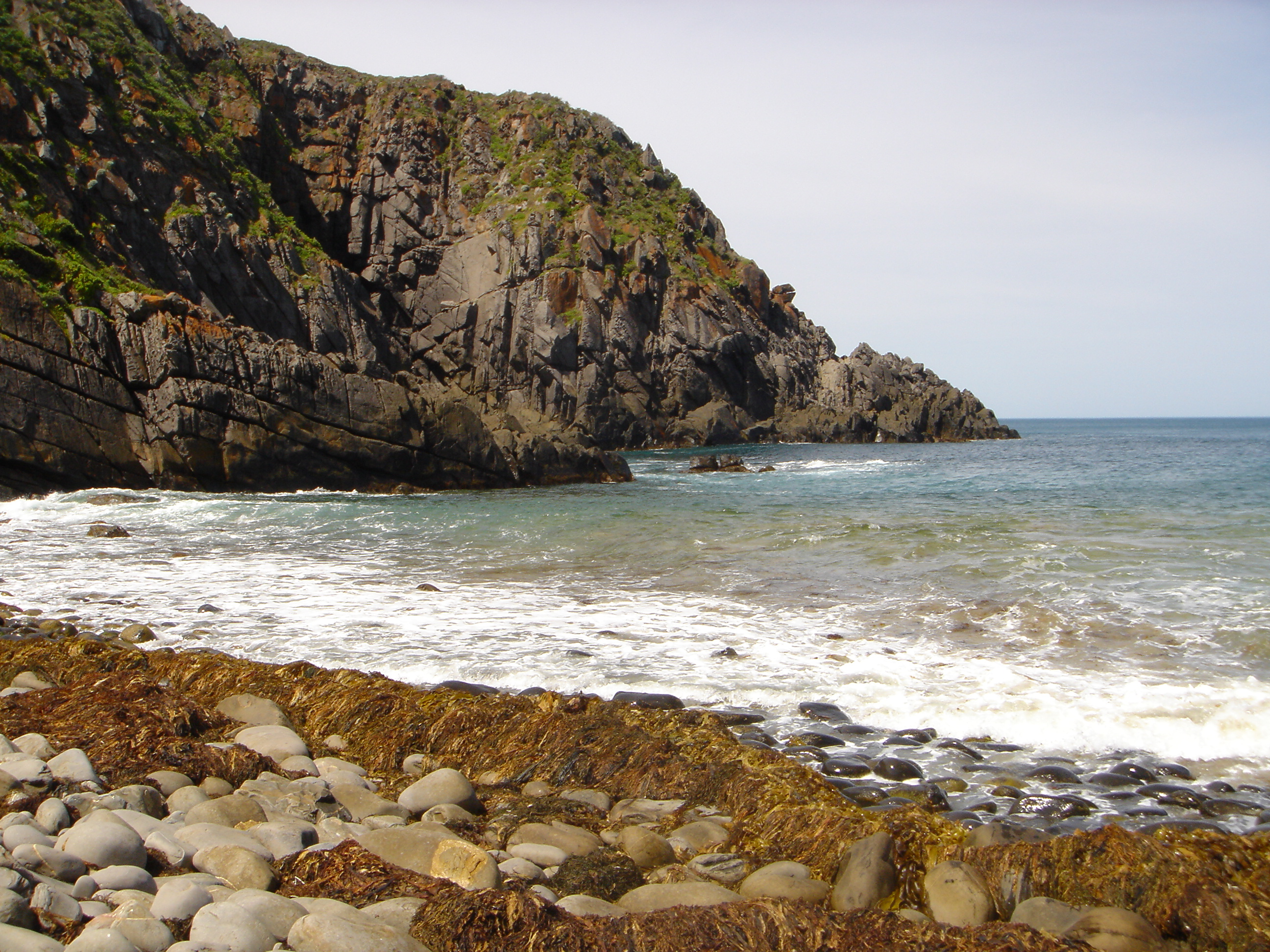
Looking south

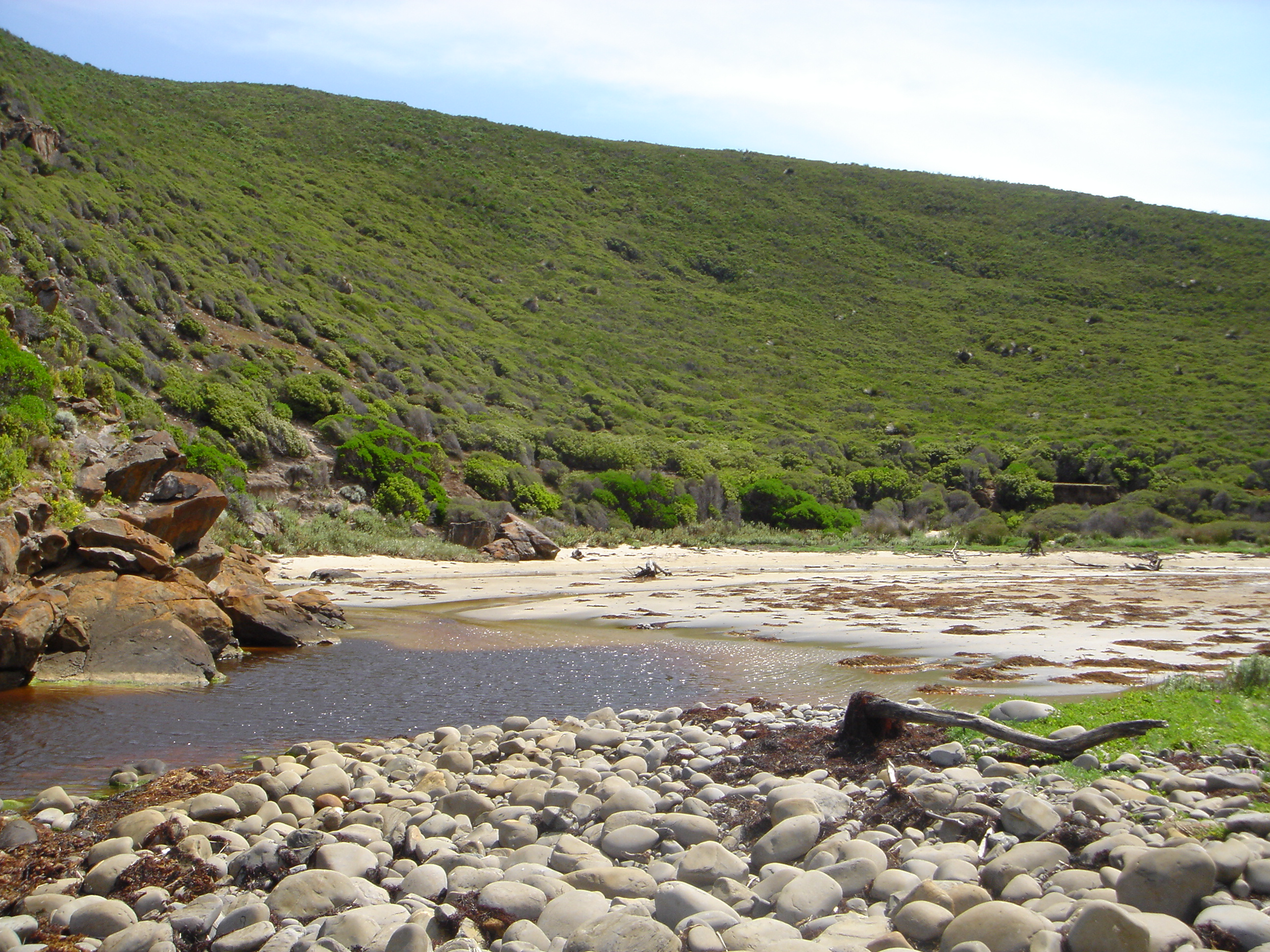
The creek mouth

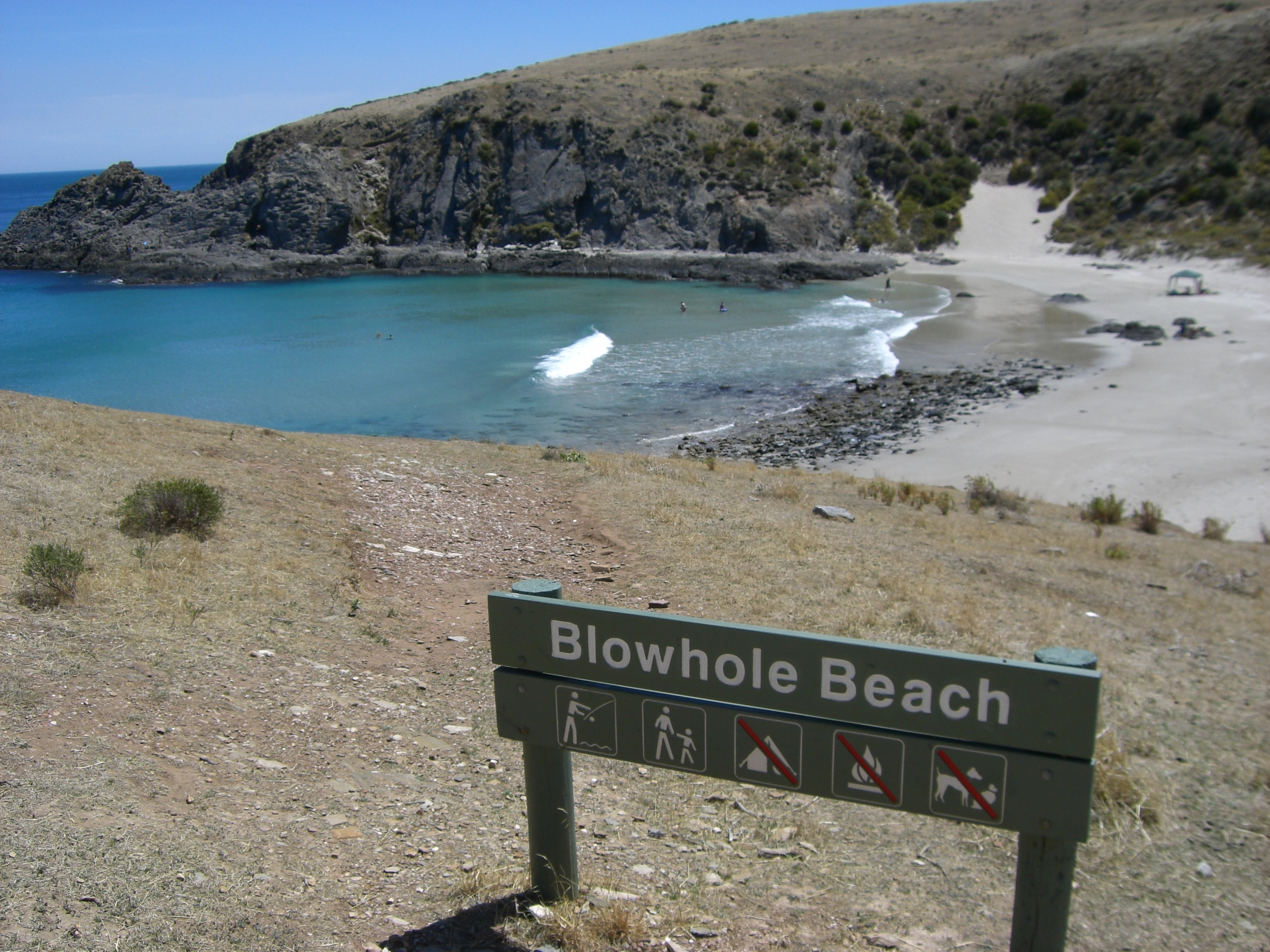
Blowhole Beach

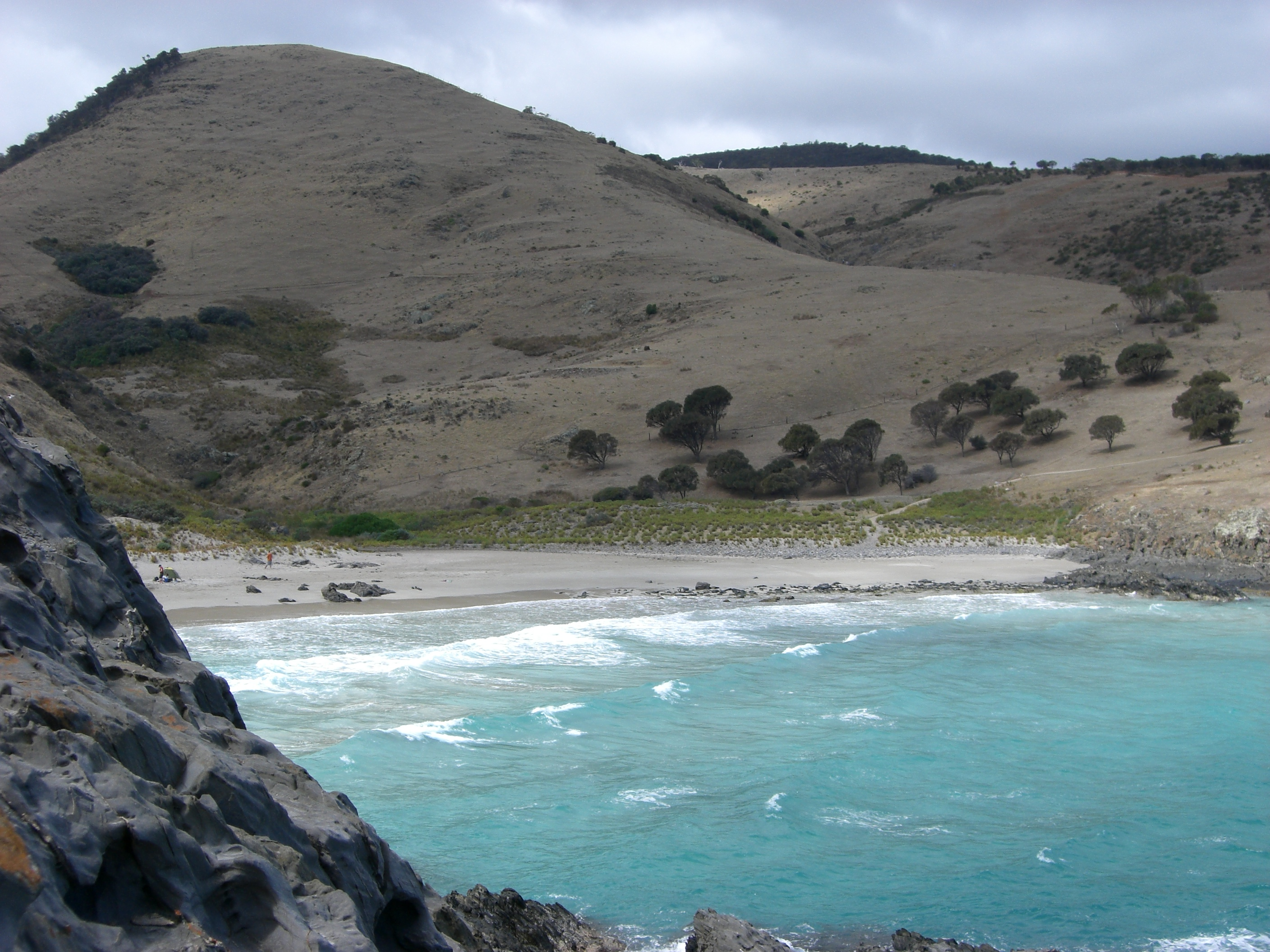
Blowhole Beach looking north east

== See also ==
- Deep Creek (disambiguation)
