= Delamere, South Australia =

Delamere South Australia
- Coordinates: 35°34′13″S 138°11′56″E
- Population: 149 (2016 census)
- Established: 5 August 1999 (locality)
- Postcode(s): 5204
- Time zone: ACST (UTC+9:30)
  - Summer (DST): ACDT (UTC+10:30)
- Location: 80 km (50 mi) S of Adelaide; 18 km (11 mi) SW of Yankalilla
- LGA(s): District Council of Yankalilla
- Region: Fleurieu and Kangaroo Island
- County: Hindmarsh
- State electorate(s): Mawson
- Federal division(s): Mayo
Mean max temp	Mean min temp	Annual rainfall
17.5 °C; 64 °F	10.2 °C; 50 °F	818.9 mm 32.2 in
Localities around Delamere:
Rapid Bay	Rapid Bay; Second Valley	Second Valley
Cape Jervis	Delamere	Second Valley; Parawa
Cape Jervis	Silverton; Deep Creek	Deep Creek
- Footnotes: Locations; Adjoining localities

Delamere is a locality in the Australian state of South Australia located on the south coast of the Fleurieu Peninsula about 80 kilometres (50 mi) south of the state capital of Adelaide and about 18 kilometres (11 mi) south-west of the municipal seat of Yankalilla. It includes what was once a neighbouring village of Bullaparinga.

The 2016 Australian census which was conducted in August 2016 reports that Delamere had a population of 149 people.

It is named after Delamere in Cheshire, England.

Delamere is located within the federal division of Mayo, the state electoral district of Mawson and the local government area of the District Council of Yankalilla.
