= Silverton, South Australia =

Silverton South Australia
- Coordinates: 35°37′05″S 138°09′39″E
- Population: 29 (2016 census)
- Established: 1864 (sub-division); 5 August 1999 (locality)
- Postcode(s): 5204
- Time zone: ACST (UTC+9:30)
  - Summer (DST): ACST (UTC+10:30)
- Location: 85 km (53 mi) S of Adelaide; 24 km (15 mi) SW of Yankalilla
- LGA(s): District Council of Yankalilla
- Region: Fleurieu and Kangaroo Island
- County: Hindmarsh
- State electorate(s): Mawson
- Federal division(s): Mayo
Mean max temp	Mean min temp	Annual rainfall
17.6 °C; 64 °F	10.3 °C; 51 °F	831.2 mm 32.7 in
Suburbs around Silverton:
Cape Jervis	Cape Jervis; Delamere	Delamere
Cape Jervis	Silverton	Delamere; Deep Creek
Cape Jervis	Cape Jervis; Deep Creek	Deep Creek
- Footnotes: Adjoining localities

Silverton is a locality in the Australian state of South Australia located about 85 kilometres (53 mi) south of the state capital of Adelaide and about 24 kilometres (15 mi) south-west of the municipal seat in Yankalilla.

Silverton began in 1864 as a sub-division of part of section 116 in the cadastral unit of the Hundred of Waitpinga developed by John Wrathall Bull in response to mining activity at the nearby Talisker silver mine which started in the 1860s and which had ceased by the 1920s. Boundaries for the locality were created on 5 August 1999 for the "local established name" which is derived from the name adopted for the sub-division.

Silverton consists of land on the eastern side of the Mount Lofty Ranges which is bounded in part to the north by the portion of Main South Road passing from Delamere in the north to Cape Jervis in the southwest.

Land use within the locality consists of 'primary production' and conservation. The latter land use is in respect to land in the locality's south which is located within the boundaries of the Talisker Conservation Park. The following places within the locality are listed on the South Australian Heritage Register – the Silverton Lodge, a dwelling which was formerly the post office and general store, and the Talisker Silver Lead Mine.

The 2016 Australian census which was conducted in August 2016 reports that Silverton had 29 people living within its boundaries.

Silverton is located within the federal division of Mayo, the state electoral district of Mawson and the local government area of the District Council of Yankalilla.
