= Second Valley, South Australia =

Coastal town in South Australia

Second Valley South Australia
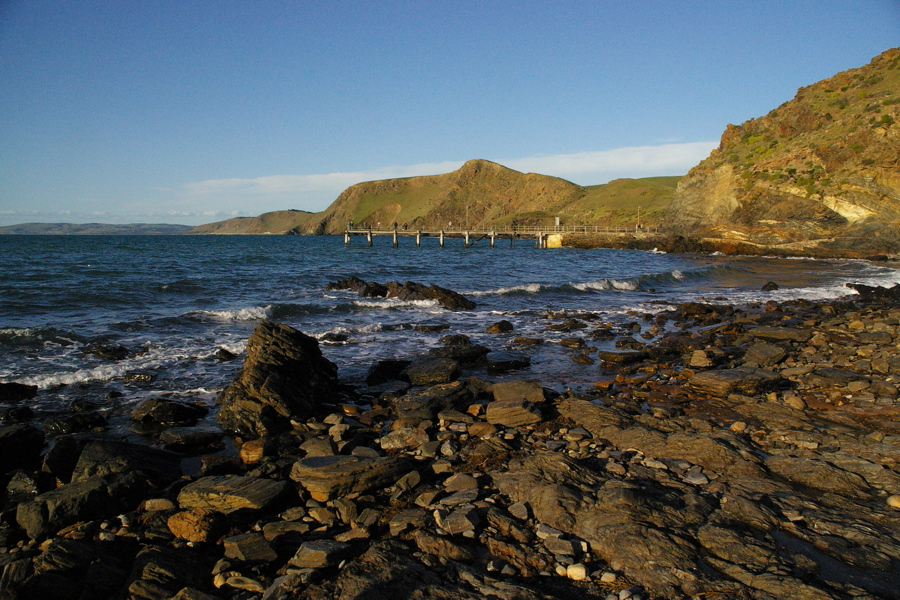
- The jetty
- Population: 162 (2016 census)
- Postcode(s): 5204
- Time zone: ACST (UTC+9:30)
  - Summer (DST): ACDT (UTC+10:30)
- Location: 74 km (46 mi) S of Adelaide; 14 km (9 mi) SW of Yankalilla
- LGA(s): District Council of Yankalilla
- Region: Fleurieu and Kangaroo Island
- County: Hindmarsh
- State electorate(s): Mawson
- Federal division(s): Mayo
Mean max temp	Mean min temp	Annual rainfall
17.5 °C; 64 °F	10.2 °C; 50 °F	818.9 mm 32.2 in
Localities around Second Valley:
Gulf St Vincent	Gulf St Vincent	Wirrina Cove
Gulf St Vincent; Rapid Bay	Second Valley	Hay Flat; Parawa
Delamere	Parawa; Delamere	Parawa
- Footnotes: Locations; Adjoining localities

Second Valley is a coastal town on the Fleurieu Peninsula in South Australia.

The name is derived from being the next valley north of Rapid Bay, the initial camp on South Australian mainland of Colonel William Light. It is a popular scuba diving destination.

Despite its small size, Second Valley has been rated as one of Australia's top ten beaches, with the variety of activities and opportunities to explore cited as contributing factors.

== Governance ==
Second Valley is located within the federal division of Mayo, the state electoral district of Mawson and the local government area of the District Council of Yankalilla.

== Gallery ==
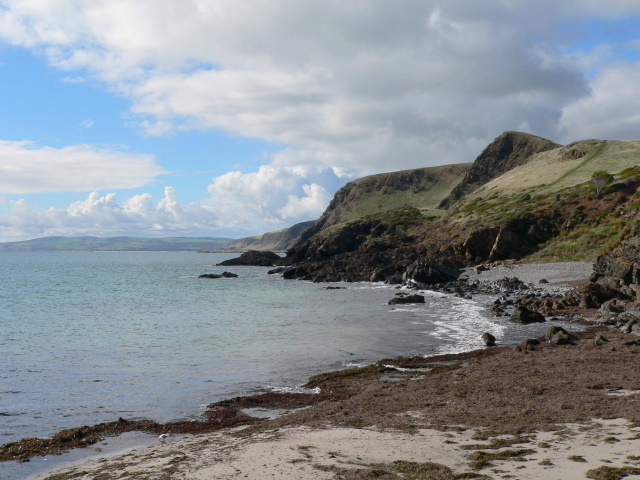
The rugged coastline north of Second Valley.

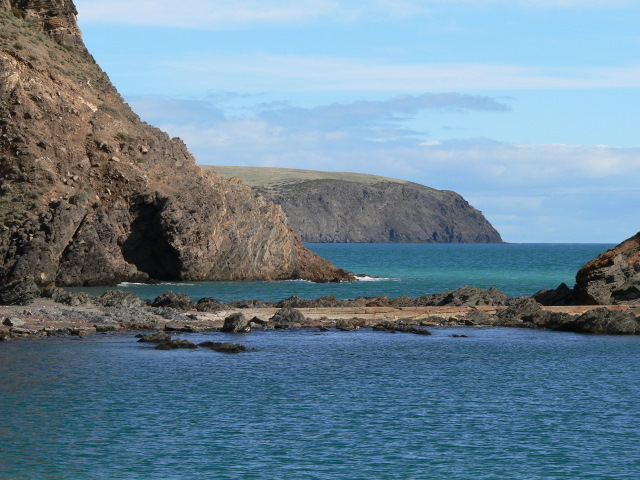
The rugged coastline south of Second Valley jetty looking towards Rapid Bay.

== See also ==
- Ingalalla Waterfalls
