= Newland Head Conservation Park =

Protected area in South Australia

- IUCN category III (natural monument or feature)
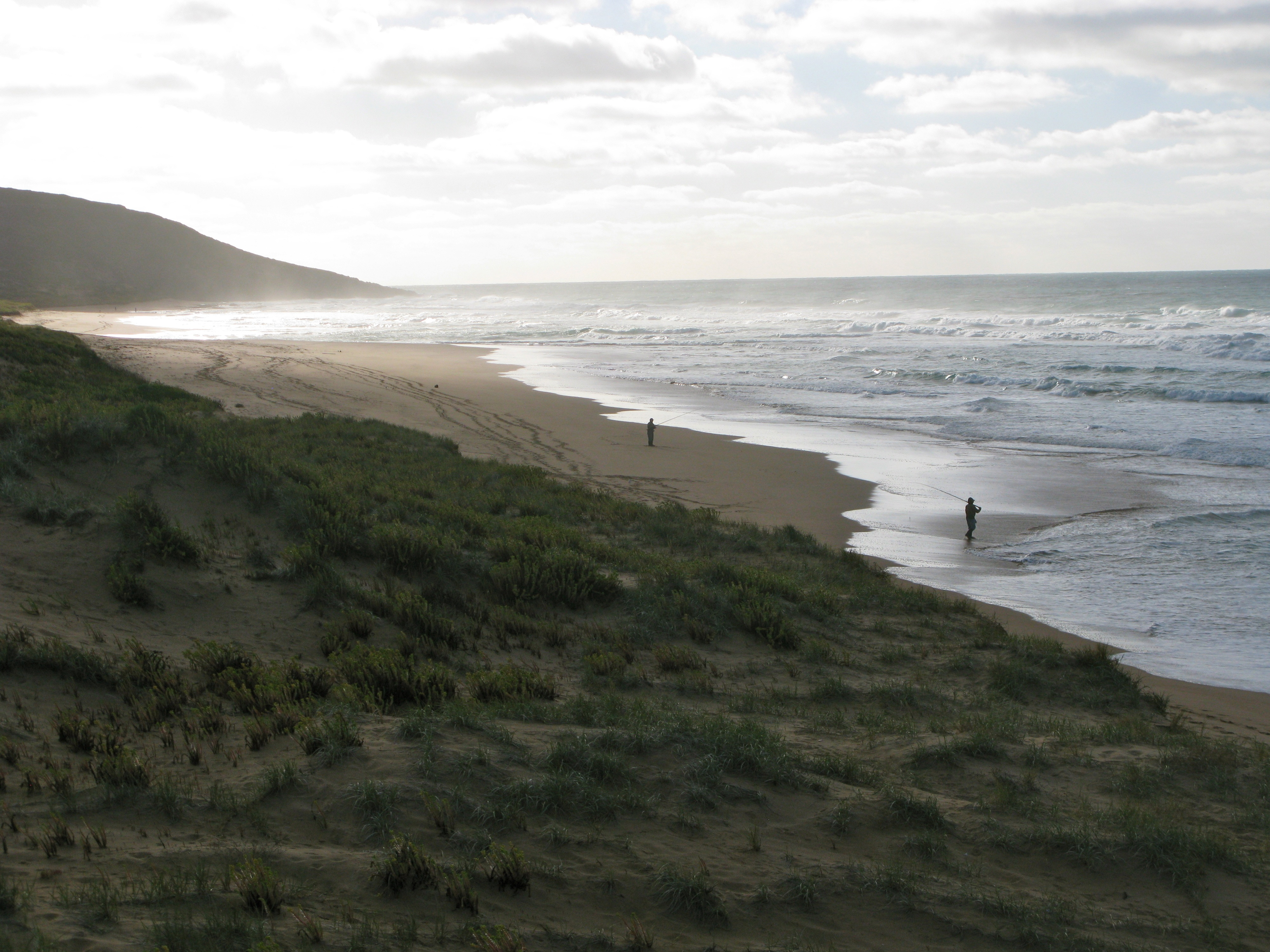
- Waitpinga Beach in the morning

- Location within South Australia
- Location: South Australia
- Nearest city: Victor Harbor
- Coordinates: 35°37′48″S 138°30′13″E
- Area: 11.74 km^{2} (4.53 sq mi)
- Established: 1985
- Visitors: 100,000 (in 2004)
- Governing body: Department for Environment and Water
- Website: Official website

Newland Head Conservation Park is a protected area located in South Australia within the locality of Waitpinga on the southern coast of the Fleurieu Peninsula 91 km south of the centre of Adelaide, and 7 km southwest of Victor Harbor. Its name is taken from Newland Head that feature prominently at the eastern boundary of the park. The conservation park is classified as an IUCN Category III protected area.

The park features two long beaches, Waitpinga and Parsons, which are used by surfers and fishers, but are not suitable for swimming due to strong rips and hidden gutters. The park also features several walking trails, including part of the Heysen Trail.

== Camping ==
The Waitpinga campground is the only campground available in the park. It is situated 750 metres inland from Waitpinga Beach, sheltered from the sea breeze by large sand dunes (the Aboriginal meaning of Waitpinga is "Windy Place"). The campground features reasonably private individual sites surrounded by native vegetation including pink gums and wattle. Facilities include limited tank water, toilets, picnic areas and a communal barbecue area (including gas barbecues). Wood fires are not permitted at any time; gas or fuel stoves may be used. Camping fees apply.

A walking trail that traverses the sand dunes, and affords views of the Southern Ocean coastline, connects the campground and the beach. Other walking trails begin at the eastern end of the campground.

== Walking trails ==
Several walking trails start from the eastern end of the Waitpinga campground. The following information is based on the Parks SA information sign displayed at the trail head:

- Ridgeway Hill Loop Hike. Flat trail crossing open mallee then through dense flowering understorey. A variety of birds can be seen in spring. Distance: 6.25 km return.
- Coastal Cliffs Loop Hike. Flat trail to the cliffs of Newland Head. Affords views of the Newland Head cliffs, the Southern Ocean and Kangaroo Island. Distance: 7.5 km return.
- Campground to Beach Hike. Distance: 750m.
- Heysen Trail. Distance: 12.25 km (within the park).

A lookout is located atop a large water tank 500 metres along the walking trail, east of the campground.

== See also ==
- Protected areas of South Australia
