= Tunkalilla =

- Suburb
- Coordinates: 35.616°S 138.3390°E
- Country: Australia
- State: South Australia
- Region: Fleurieu and Kangaroo Island
- LGA: District Council of Yankalilla
- Location: 83 km (52 mi) S of Adelaide
- Established: 1999

Government
  - State electorate: Mawson
  - Federal division: Mayo

Population
  - Total: 6 (SAL 2021)
- Time zone: UTC+9:30 (ACST)
  - Summer (DST): UTC+10:30 (ACST)
- Postcode: 5203
- Mean max temp: 17.5 °C (63.5 °F)
- Mean min temp: 10.2 °C (50.4 °F)
- Annual rainfall: 818.9 mm (32.24 in)
Suburbs around Tunkalilla
Parawa	Parawa	Parawa
Deep Creek	Tunkililla	Parawa; Waitpinga
Backstairs Passage	Backstairs Passage	Backstairs Passage

Tunkalilla is a locality in the Australian state of South Australia located on the south coast of the Fleurieu Peninsula overlooking Backstairs Passage about 83 kilometres (52 miles) south of the state capital of Adelaide.

Tunkalilla's boundaries were created in August 1999 along with the selection of its name which is derived from prior uses of the name for features such as a creek, a beach and a homestead.

As of 2015, the principal land use within the locality is primary production uses such as agriculture. A secondary land use is conservation which includes the protected area known as the Eric Bonython Conservation Park and the coastline overlooking Backstairs Passage.

Tunkalilla is located within the federal division of Mayo, the state electoral district of Mawson and the local government area of the District Council of Yankalilla.
