= Waitpinga Conservation Park =

Protected area in South Australia

- IUCN category III (natural monument or feature)
- Location within South Australia
- Location: South Australia, Parawa
- Nearest city: Yankalilla
- Coordinates: 35°35′25.79″S 138°19′26.04″E
- Area: 3 ha (7.4 acres)
- Established: 1 January 1960
- Visitors: "very few visitors" (in 2009)
- Governing body: Department for Environment and Water

Waitpinga Conservation Park (formerly the Waitpinga National Parks Reserve) is a protected area in the Australian state of South Australia located about 15 kilometres (9.3 miles) south of the town of the Yankalilla in the gazetted locality of Parawa.

On 9 November 1967, it was proclaimed under the National Parks Act 1966 as the Waitpinga National Parks Reserve in respect to an area of land already under statutory protection. The conservation park was proclaimed under the National Parks and Wildlife Act 1972 on 27 April 1972.

As of 2011, it was described as being "dedicated to the conservation of the rare Coral Fern". The conservation park contains a "low open forest of stringbark and pink gum, over an understorey of bracken, tea-tree, sedges and grasses". Notable fauna includes the chestnut-rumped heathwren, which is a nationally-listed endangered species.

The conservation park is within the extent of "Illawong Swamp" which is listed as a wetland of national importance and immediately adjoins a forestry plantation operated by ForestrySA as part of its Second Valley Forest operation.

The conservation park is classified as an IUCN Category III protected area.
