= Deep Creek, South Australia =

Deep Creek South Australia
- Coordinates: 35.635°S 138.213°E
- Population: 28 (SAL 2016)
- Established: 1999
- Postcode(s): 5204
- Time zone: ACST (UTC+9:30)
  - Summer (DST): ACST (UTC+10:30)
- Location: 85 km (53 mi) S of Adelaide city centre
- LGA(s): District Council of Yankalilla
- Region: Fleurieu and Kangaroo Island
- State electorate(s): Mawson
- Federal division(s): Mayo
Mean max temp	Mean min temp	Annual rainfall
17.5 °C; 64 °F	10.2 °C; 50 °F	818.9 mm 32.2 in
Suburbs around Deep Creek:
Silverton	Delamere	Parawa
Cape Jervis	Deep Creek	Tunkalilla
Backstairs Passage	Backstairs Passage	Backstairs Passage
- Footnotes: Location; Coordinates; Climatic data Adjoining localities

Deep Creek is a locality in the Australian state of South Australia located on the south coast of the Fleurieu Peninsula overlooking Backstairs Passage about 85 kilometres (53 miles) south of the Adelaide city centre.

Deep Creek's boundaries were created in August 1999 along with the selection of its name which is derived from the watercourse located within its extent.

As of 2015, land use within the locality consists of land zoned both for primary production uses such as agriculture and zoned for conservation purposes such as the protected area known as Deep Creek Conservation Park and the coastline overlooking Backstairs Passage.

Deep Creek is located within the federal division of Mayo, the state electoral district of Mawson and the local government area of the District Council of Yankalilla.

== See also ==
- Deep Creek (disambiguation)
