= Cape Jervis Lighthouse =

Lighthouset in South Australia

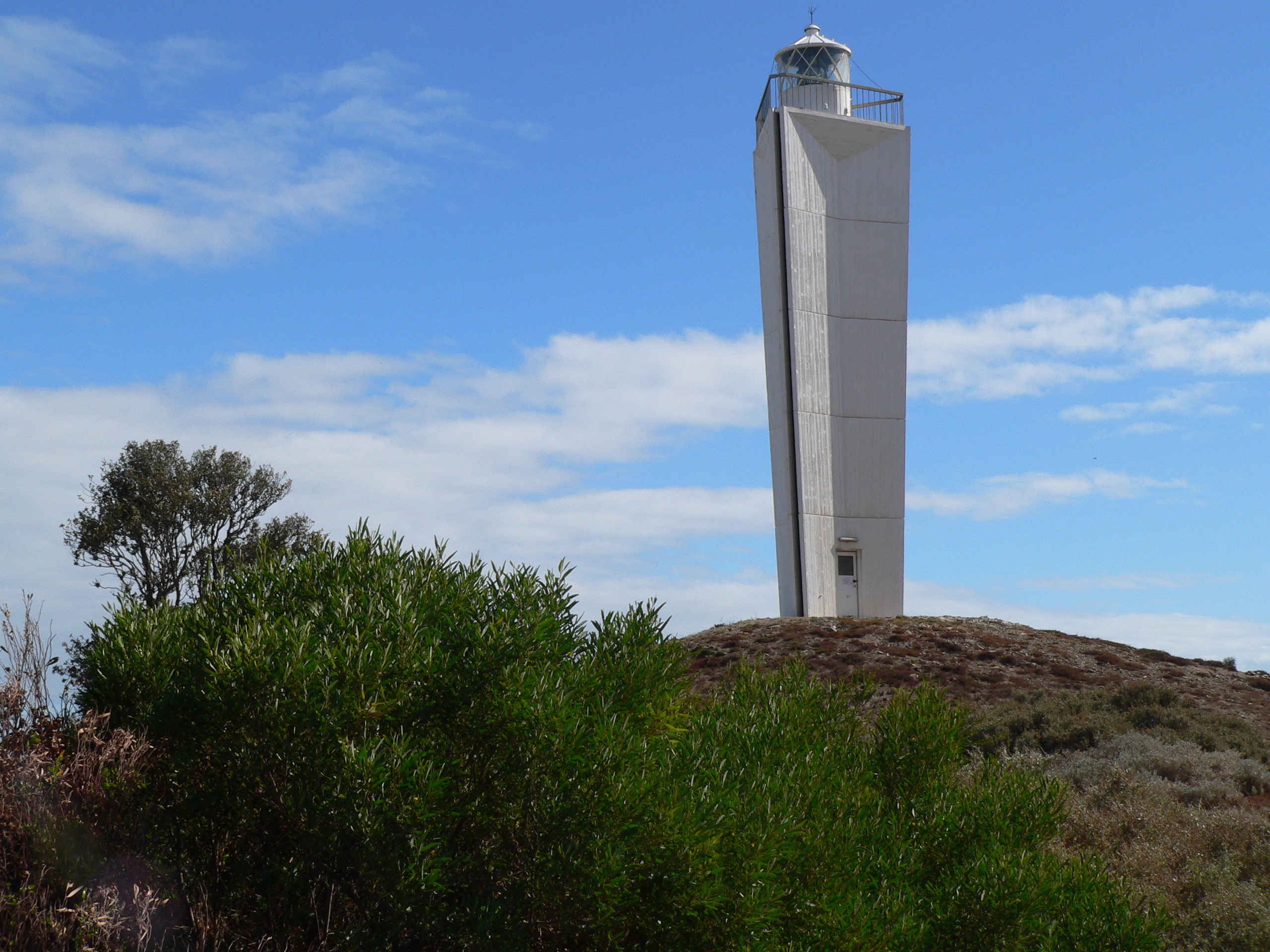
- Location: Cape Jervis; Fleurieu Peninsula; South Australia; Australia
- Coordinates: 35°36′13.2″S 138°5′40.1″E

Tower
- Constructed: 1871 (first)
- Construction: concrete tower
- Height: 18 metres (59 ft)
- Shape: inverted-pyramidal (wider at the top than the bottom) tower with balcony and lantern
- Markings: white tower
- Operator: Australian Maritime Safety Authority

Light
- First lit: 1972 (current)
- Focal height: 23 metres (75 ft)
- Characteristic: Fl (4) W 20s.

Cape Jervis Lighthouse is a lighthouse located at the headland of Cape Jervis on the most westerly part of the Fleurieu Peninsula on the east coast of Gulf St Vincent in South Australia.

== History ==
It was first lit on 10 August 1871. In 1972, the original tower was replaced by a new tower.

== See also ==
- List of lighthouses in Australia
