= Eric Bonython Conservation Park =

Protected area in South Australia

- IUCN category Ia (strict nature reserve)
- Location within South Australia
- Location: South Australia
- Nearest city: Yankalilla
- Coordinates: 35°36′3.24″S 138°19′48″E
- Area: 6 ha (15 acres)
- Established: 1 January 1960
- Visitors: "very few visitors" (in 2009)
- Governing body: Department for Environment and Water

Eric Bonython Conservation Park (formerly Eric Bonython National Parks Reserve) is a protected area in South Australia located about 16 kilometres (9.9 miles) south of the town of the Yankalilla.

The conservation park was proclaimed under the National Parks and Wildlife Act 1972 in 1972. On 9 November 1967, it was proclaimed under the National Parks Act 1966 as Eric Bonython National Parks Reserve. Prior to 1967, it was already under statutory protection.

As of 2011, the conservation park was described as being "a fine, but small, example of the pre-European settlement vegetation that once covered this area". The conservation park contains a dominant forest of messmate stringybark with an understorey including "tall shrubs and mid ferns" as well as the nationally endangered perennial herb, Osborn's eyebright.

The conservation park is classified as an IUCN Category Ia protected area.
