= Encounter Bay, South Australia =

Encounter Bay
- Suburb
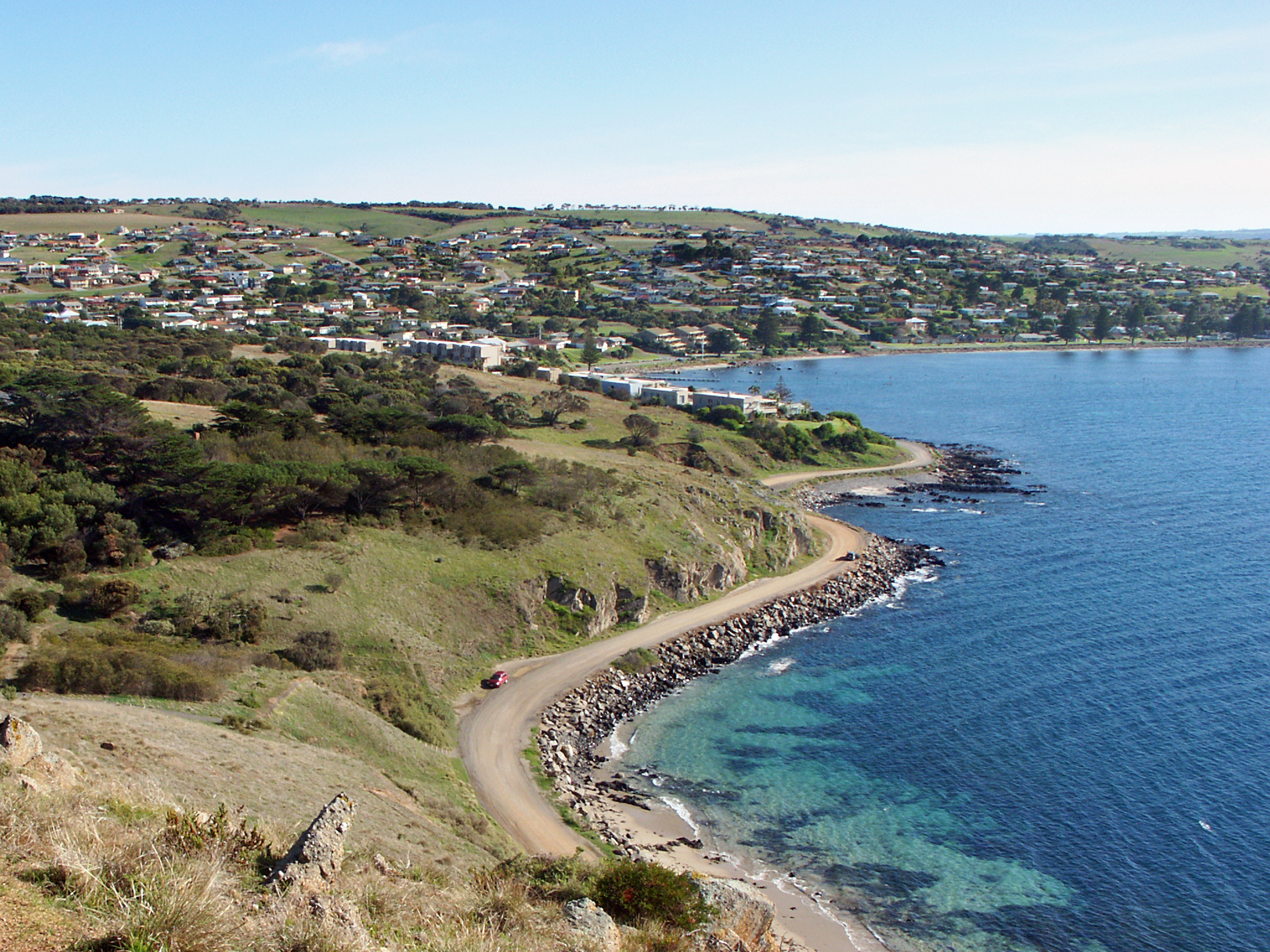
- View over the locality of Encounter Bay from the Bluff

- Coordinates: 35°34′46″S 138°35′30″E
- Country: Australia
- State: South Australia
- Region: Fleurieu and Kangaroo Island
- City: Victor Harbor
- LGA: City of Victor Harbor
- Location: 4 km (2.5 mi) southwest of Victor Harbor; 87 km (54 mi) south of Adelaide
- Established: 9 September 1993

Government
  - State electorate: Finniss
  - Federal division: Mayo

Population
  - Total: 5,305 (SAL 2021)
- Time zone: UTC+9:30 (ACST)
  - Summer (DST): UTC+10:30 (ACST)
- Postcode: 5211
- County: Hindmarsh
- Mean max temp: 20.6 °C (69.1 °F)
- Mean min temp: 10.2 °C (50.4 °F)
- Annual rainfall: 547.9 mm (21.57 in)
Suburbs around Encounter Bay
Back Valley		Victor Harbor
Waitpinga	Encounter Bay	Encounter Bay
	Ocean

Encounter Bay is a locality in the Australian state of South Australia located about 87 kilometres (54 mi) south of the state capital of Adelaide and about 4 kilometres (2.5 mi) south-west of the municipal seat of Victor Harbor.

== Description ==
Encounter Bay's boundaries were created on 9 September 1993 for the "local established name" of the bay, Encounter Bay. The locality of Encounter Bay consists of land at the western end of Encounter Bay partly overlooking the subsidiary bay of Rosetta Harbour and which includes the headland of Rosetta Head (commonly known as The Bluff). State Route B37 passes through the locality under the names of Waitpinga Road and Bay Road, and forms part of the locality's boundary to the north-west.

Land use is mainly residential, with some land adjoining the suburb of Victor Harbor in the north-east being zoned for "light industry" and land at the locality's southern extremity being zoned for "primary industry". Located within the latter area, Rosetta Head is also listed as a state heritage place on the South Australian Heritage Register.

== Demographics ==
The population is growing: in the 2016 census it was recorded as 4901, and by 2021 census had grown to 5,305.

== Governance ==
Encounter Bay is located within the federal division of Mayo, the state electoral district of Finniss and the local government area of the City of Victor Harbor.
