= Fleurieu =

Fleurieu may refer to the following:

== People ==
- Charles Pierre Claret de Fleurieu (1738-1810), French naval officer and politician

== Places ==
Australia

- Fleurieu (biogeographic region), a sub-region within the Interim Biogeographic Regionalisation for Australia
- Fleurieu Group, an island group in Tasmania consisting of the three main islands - Hunter Island, Robbins Island and Three Hummock Island.
- Fleurieu and Kangaroo Island, a government region in South Australia
- Fleurieu Peninsula, a peninsula in South Australia
- Fleurieu zone, a grouping of five wine regions in South Australia, including the
  - Southern Fleurieu wine region

Pacific Ocean

- Fleurieu's Whirlpool, an earlier name for the North Pacific Gyre

== Other ==
- Fleurieu Art Prize, a landscape art prize associated with the Fleurieu Peninsula in South Australia
