= Waitpinga, South Australia =

Waitpinga
- Town
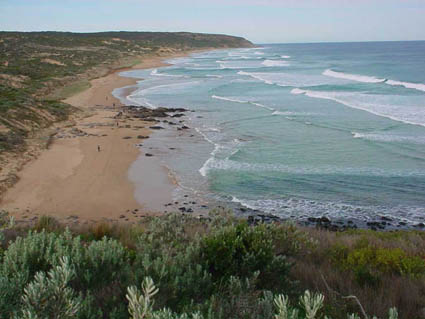
- Waitpinga beach viewed from the Heysen Trail

- Coordinates: 35°36′0″S 138°32′0″E
- Country: Australia
- State: South Australia
- Region: Fleurieu and Kangaroo Island
- LGA: City of Victor Harbor District Council of Yankalilla
- Location: 75 km (47 mi) south of Adelaide; 10 km (6.2 mi) south-west of Victor Harbor; 22 km (14 mi) south-east of Yankalilla

Government
  - State electorate: Finniss
  - Federal division: Mayo

Population
  - Total: 222 (2011 census)
- Postcode: 5211
- County: County of Hindmarsh
- Mean max temp: 20.5 °C (68.9 °F)
- Mean min temp: 10.2 °C (50.4 °F)
- Annual rainfall: 540.6 mm (21.28 in)
Localities around Waitpinga
Tunkalilla	Parawa; Willow Creek; Back Valley	Back Valley
Tunkalilla	Waitpinga	Encounter Bay
	Investigator Strait
- Location; Climate; Adjoining localities

Waitpinga (locally /waɪˈpɪŋɡə/ wy-PING-gə) is a locality in the Australian state of South Australia located about 75 kilometres (47 miles) south of the state capital of Adelaide and about 10 kilometres (6.2 miles) southwest of the municipal seat of Victor Harbor.

At the 2011 census, Waitpinga had a population of 165. The name is of Aboriginal origin, meaning home of the winds.

Waitpinga's coastline includes the following beaches popular for activities such as fishing and surfing – Coolawang, King Head, Parsons Beach and Waitpinga. It is also one of the most dangerous beaches for surfers or swimmers without experience in rough conditions. Swimmers can easily become trapped in rips and rough seas and there is no life saving service at this beach. There are rough waves, powerful rips and sharks who come to feed on the salmon and mullet.

Waitpinga is located within the federal division of Mayo, the state electoral district of Finniss and the local government areas of the City of Victor Harbor and the District Council of Yankalilla.

== See also ==
- List of cities and towns in South Australia
- Newland Head Conservation Park
