= Shrine of Our Lady of Yankalilla =

Virgin Mary shrine in Australia

The Shrine of Our Lady of Yankalilla is an Australian site venerating the Virgin Mary, the mother of Jesus. The shrine came into being following the appearance of an image of the Virgin in the Anglican church in Yankallia in 1994.

== Christ Church, Yankalilla ==
The shrine is inside the Anglican Christ Church parish church in Yankalilla, a town 70 kilometres southwest of Adelaide, South Australia. The church was built in 1857, with a bell-tower added in 1892.

== The image of the Virgin Mary ==
In August 1994 an image was said to have become visible on a wall behind the altar of the 19th century stone church. The image was interpreted to be an image of the Virgin Mary which depicted her face, features, shoulders and abdomen. It is claimed that the image later changed to depict Mary holding the crucified Christ in the manner of a pietà with her gaze directed toward the tabernacle below containing the consecrated eucharistic bread. It is also claimed that an image of a rose (a symbol of Mary) appears at the bottom of the larger image.

Two years after the image appeared on the wall, the Adelaide Advertiser covered the story. Within a few days, the news media descended on the small seaside town and the first pilgrims began arriving from Australia and overseas, some of whom also reported seeing similar apparitions re-occur. In December 1996, the Bishop of The Murray, Graham Walden, blessed the church as "The Shrine of Our Lady of Yankalilla". The Canadian-born parish priest, Andrew Notere, was involved in developing the church as a pilgrimage centre and several documentaries were filmed. One, Visions of Yankalilla, has been screened on a number of national broadcast services worldwide. The shrine has become the centre of a healing ministry; it has been the venue of several claimed sightings of the Virgin Mary and several photos of the Madonna in the church.

A well for holy water is on the site and a hybrid rose has been cultivated called "Our Lady of Yankalilla". The South Australia Tourism Commission has developed a marketing brochure for the shrine entitled "Mary Among the Eucalypts". The Australian artist Pro Hart donated a painting to the shrine and a large mural of the Virgin of Yankalilla has been mounted on an exterior wall of the retreat centre adjacent to the church.
