= District Council of Yankalilla =

Coordinates: 35°27′18″S 138°20′08″E

- Local government area
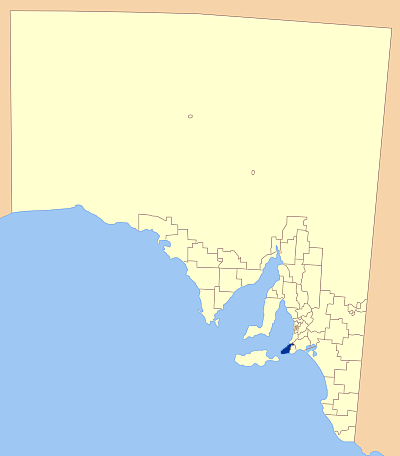
- Location of the District Council of Yankalilla

- Interactive map of District Council of Yankalilla
- Country: Australia
- State: South Australia
- Region: Fleurieu and Kangaroo Island
- Established: 1856
- Council seat: Yankalilla

Government
  - Mayor: Darryl Houston
  - State electorates: Finniss; Mawson
  - Federal division: Mayo

Area
  - Total: 750.6 km^{2} (289.8 sq mi)

Population
  - Total: 5,834 (LGA 2021)
  - Density: 7.77/km^{2} (20.1/sq mi)
- Website: District Council of Yankalilla
LGAs around District Council of Yankalilla
	City of Onkaparinga	Alexandrina Council
	District Council of Yankalilla	City of Victor Harbor
Kangaroo Island Council

The District Council of Yankalilla is a local government area centred on the town of Yankalilla on the Fleurieu Peninsula in South Australia.

It was created on 23 October 1856, when the District Council of Yankalilla and Myponga was divided into two. It later absorbed two other councils: the District Council of Myponga on 5 January 1888, one of a number of amalgamations mandated under the District Councils Act 1887, and later the District Council of Rapid Bay on 12 May 1932.

The district has a rich history, as one of the earliest South Australian coastal settlements, and a wide range of agricultural activities having taken place. Today the district remains agricultural in nature, supplemented by tourism and forestry.

== History ==
=== Pre-European ===
The Fleurieu Peninsula was originally inhabited by the Indigenous Kaurna people, who openly met with the Ramindjeri and other peoples for trade and exchanges. Aboriginal myth credits the formation of the land forms of the Fleurieu Peninsula to the travels of Tjilbruke as he grieved carrying the body of his nephew from the Sturt River to Cape Jervis.

Evidence of Megafauna, including bones attributed to Diprotodon, Maesopus – the giant kangaroo and Thylacoleo – a marsupial lion, was discovered in the 1890s. A Diprotodon leg bone was found in a swamp in the 1890s and conjecture surrounds the possibility that the animals were hunted by local aboriginal groups.

=== European history ===
The Fleurieu Peninsula was first mapped by Europeans in 1802 with both the French Nicholas Baudin and the English Matthew Flinders travelling the coastline, with Baudin giving Fleurieu Peninsula its name.

William Light was the first to land on the mainland, at Rapid Bay in 1836, and declared the area "rich beyond expectation". His report resulted in the early intensive settlement of the area and the district was considered for the site of the new settlement of South Australia, before further surveying showed the site of Adelaide to be superior.

Governor Hindmarsh recorded the aboriginal pronunciation of "Yoongalilla", as applied to the district and noted this in dispatches of 1837. Other legends as to the origin of the name exist, with some claims that the area was named after an American "Yankie" whaler, whose kind frequented the area at the time. There is little evidence for most of these theories however. In 1911, the town was officially proclaimed Yankalilla, which was to later become the name of the district.

Whalers and sealers became the first Europeans to establish semi-permanently in the district in the early 19th century, with a whaling station established at Fisheries Beach, but a combination of shipwrecks, decreasing whale numbers and the petroleum industry forced its closure in 1855.

Farming land in the district was also surveyed for purchase in 1838, with land released in 1840 and communities established at Myponga, Second Valley, Rapid Bay and later at Yankalilla. Sheep, potatoes and wheat were the first produce, with a variety of other crops grown later, including milling and the extraction of tannins from wattle bark prevalent in the district. Second Valley, Normanville and Yankalilla all had jetties constructed to serve the increasing demand for export.

In 1852 the South Australian Government proclaimed an Act of Parliament appointing District Councils to administer local affairs. The District Council of Yankalilla was constituted on 5 April 1854.

The district has remained an important one to the State, transforming from the early days of European settlement as a vital connection for resources, to an integral part of South Australia's tourism interests and links between the mainland and Kangaroo Island.

== Economy ==
A number of industries has come and gone in the district, including whaling and sealing, but agriculture now remains the staple source of the areas economy.

In the past, a number of products was farmed, including sheep, potatoes, wheat, beans, flax, tobacco, oats, maize and barley, as well as the aforementioned flour milling, timber milling and mining.

Dairy farming has become a major part of the districts economy, and along with cereal crops and sheep, is the district's main source of economy. More recent developments include the trials of vineyards in the district, as well as land based aquaculture and sustainable forestry.

Tourism also plays a major role in the area, with its close proximity to Adelaide drawing large crowds to the seaside towns, especially during summer.

== Localities ==
The District Council includes the following localities - Back Valley (part), Bald Hills, Cape Jervis, Carrickalinga, Deep Creek, Delamere, Hay Flat, Inman Valley, Mount Compass, Myponga, Myponga Beach, Normanville, Pages Flat (part), Parawa, Rapid Bay, Second Valley, Sellicks Hill, Silverton, Torrens Vale, Tunkalilla, Waitpinga, Wattle Flat, Willow Creek, Wirrina Cove and Yankalilla.

== Geographical features ==
Mount Hayfield is in Hay Flat. Mount Hayfield is a significant Aboriginal site, known as Wateira nengal, due to its connection with the Kaurna Dreaming story of the hero Tjilbruke. Tjilbruke, the creator being of the Kaurna people, is said to have created yellow ochre at this site.

There is a strenuous bush walk starting at the Ingalalla Waterfall and tracking through parts of the Second Valley Forest.

== Elected members ==
Mayor: Darryl Houston

CEO: Nathan Cunningham

Councillors: Tim Moffat, Simon Rothwell, Wayne Gibbs, David Olsson, Bill Verwey, Glenn Rowlands, Lawrie Polomka

Council currently meets once a month on the third Tuesday of the month, commencing at 4.00pm

== See also ==
- List of parks and gardens in rural South Australia
- Lady Bay, South Australia
