= Yankalilla, South Australia =

Yankalilla
- Town
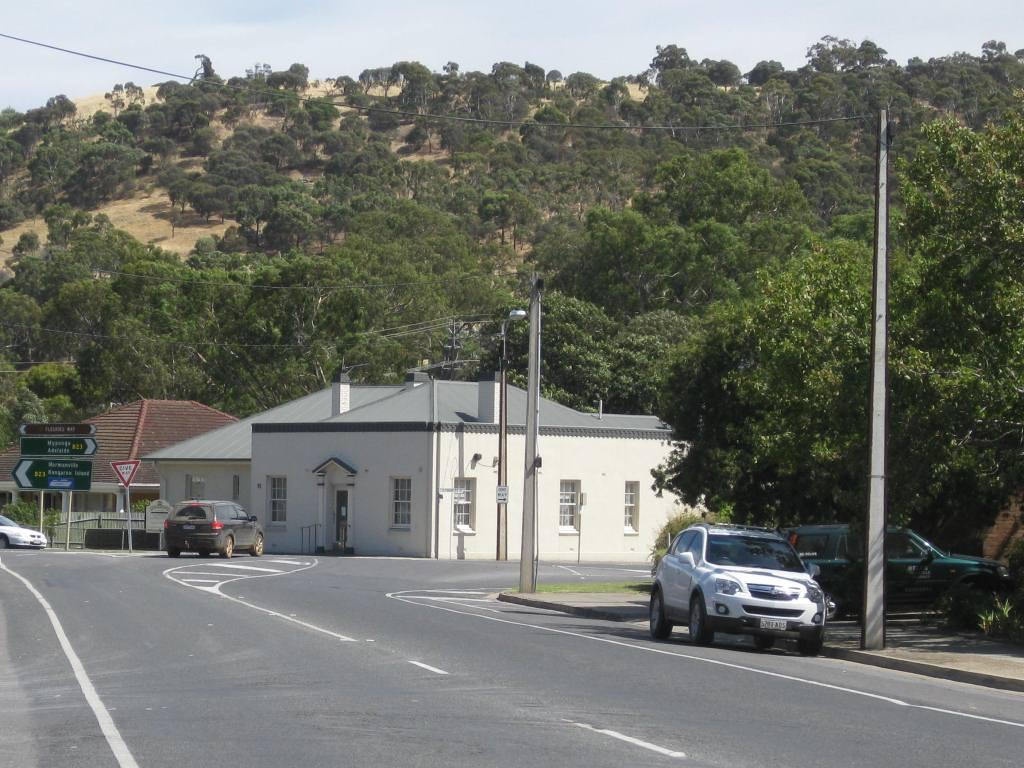
- Main Street, Yankalilla

- Coordinates: 35°27′0″S 138°21′0″E
- Country: Australia
- State: South Australia
- Region: Fleurieu and Kangaroo Island
- LGA: District Council of Yankalilla
- Location: 72 km (45 mi) South of Adelaide via
- Established: 1842

Government
  - State electorate: Mawson
  - Federal division: Mayo

Area
  - Total: 2.7 km^{2} (1.0 sq mi)

Population
  - Total: 795 (UCL 2021)
- Postcode: 5203
- Mean max temp: 17.1 °C (62.8 °F)
- Mean min temp: 10.0 °C (50.0 °F)
- Annual rainfall: 825.5 mm (32.50 in)

Yankalilla is an agriculturally based town situated on the Fleurieu Peninsula in South Australia, located 72 km south of the state's capital of Adelaide. The town is nestled in the Bungala River valley, overlooked by the southern Mount Lofty Ranges and acts as a service centre for the surrounding agricultural district.

In the early stages of the colonisation of the state, Yankalilla was a highly important location, but its close proximity to Adelaide and the advent of fast transport has greatly diminished this position.

== Etymology ==
The origin of the town's name is unclear, but it is known that Governor Hindmarsh recorded the Kaurna pronunciation of "Yoongalilla", as applied to the District and noted this in dispatches of 1837. Colonel Light, however wrote about it as Yanky-lilly and Yanky Point, giving rise to the unsubstantiated idea that it was named after an American whaler or an American ship named 'Lilly' which was wrecked off the coast.

According to Geoff Manning, Norman Tindale said that the word is "derived from the Aboriginal word jankalan, meaning "falling", from an incident in the myth of Tjilbruke, whose sister's [sic] mummified body began to fall into pieces here, as he was carrying it from Brighton to Cape Jervis for burial".

In 2002, Kaurna scholar Georgina Yambo Williams, in a paper co-authored by University of Adelaide linguist Robert Amery, drew from her own knowledge and various literary sources from the period of British colonisation of South Australia. In it, she relates that Yankalilla comes from the words yerkandi, meaning "to fall to, to join onto", much in the way a disease does, and lya and illa, which means "place". Thus "Yankalilla" is literally "place of the fallen bits". This is considered by Yambo Williams to be in reference to the Dreaming story of Tjilbruke, who carried his dead nephew's disintegrating body from (what is now called) the Sturt River (Warriparinga) to Yankalilla and then collapsed. One version of the story of Tjilbruke spells it Yarnkalyilla ("place of the falling bits"), and describes a cave where Tjilbruke deposits his nephew's body. Recent scholarly research by Chester Schulz has concluded that the original site of Yankalilla was Lady Bay, at the mouth of the Yankalilla River just south of Normanville.

Other references to the meaning of Yankalilla come from Kallangoo (Kalunggu) recorded in Robinson's journal on 2 June 2, 1837 "Said the country where she came from was called BAT.BUN.GER [Patpangga = Rapid Bay] YANG.GAL.LALE.LAR [Yankalilla]. It is situate at the west point of St. Vincents Gulf. Said that Emue’s brother was her husband. It is on the sea coast; there is a long sandy beach with three rivers.". All of the "Adelaide tribe" – Kaurna language – words starting with "Yanga" mean something to do with wife or women in the 1840 Outlines of a grammar, vocabulary, and phraseology of the Aboriginal language of South Australia by Teichelmann and Schurmann. Yankalilla is the Place of Fallen Bits and the crumbling cliff line in Yankalilla Bay tells this but the meaning of the name Yankalilla is recorded as something to do with a women's place.

== History ==
=== Aboriginal history ===
The Yankalilla area was originally inhabited by the Kaurna, an Aboriginal Australian people, who occupied an area of land stretching from Cape Jervis, up the western side of the Fleurieu Peninsula, to the top of Gulf St Vincent. The Kaurna occasionally met with the Ramindjeri people from the Encounter Bay and Fleurieu Peninsula for trade and exchange.

Aboriginal mythology credits the formation of the land forms of the Fleurieu Peninsula to the travels of Tjilbruke, the Kaurna ancestor creator as he grieved carrying the body of his nephew from the Sturt River to Cape Jervis.

=== European history ===
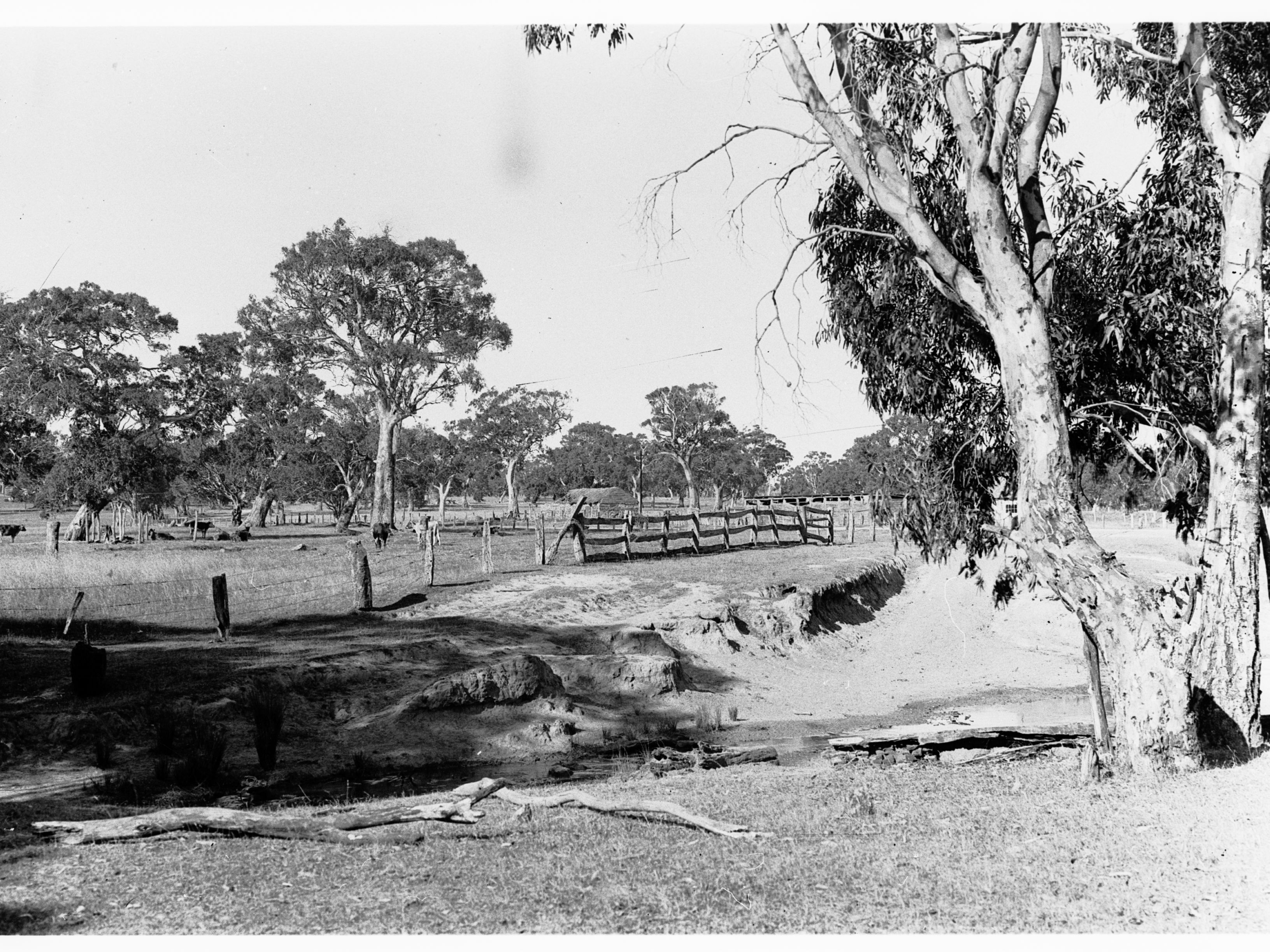
Typical dairying country on the road to Yankallila, 1925

The Yankalilla district has European history dating back to the first settlement in South Australia, with coastal areas colonised in the late 1830s. In 1839 and 1840 the area around Yankalilla was surveyed into sections of 80 acres each and this land was opened up for selection in 1840 for sheep and dairy activities and wheat growing.

In 1841 and 1842 Henry Kemmis selected sections 1181 and 1182 and in 1842 came to live on Manna Farm. He and his family lived at first in a Manning house (a prefabricated wooden house transported from England), while their stone house was being built. His wife (Mary nee Dodd) died in 1848. Kemmis remarried in 1851 to Isabella Daglish, and they left Yankalilla in the 1850s and went to Tasmania where Henry ran Campbelltown Grammar School, and later to Warrnambool to run a school there, and finally to Bathurst NSW where he was the first headmaster of All Saints College.

Also in 1842 Septimane Herbert came to Yankalilla and built a stone house which he called Wissanger. Herbert remained at Yankalilla for the rest of his life and was a prominent member of the community. Another early settler was Thomas Willson, who bought land from Kemmis in 1853. In 1857 he had part of his land surveyed into 25 allotments to form the township of Yankalilla (plan 344 of 1857). Willson built the Yankalilla Hotel, a general store, and a grain store at Normanville. He served on the District Council and gave land for the Council Chambers. He moved to Kangaroo Island in about 1865.

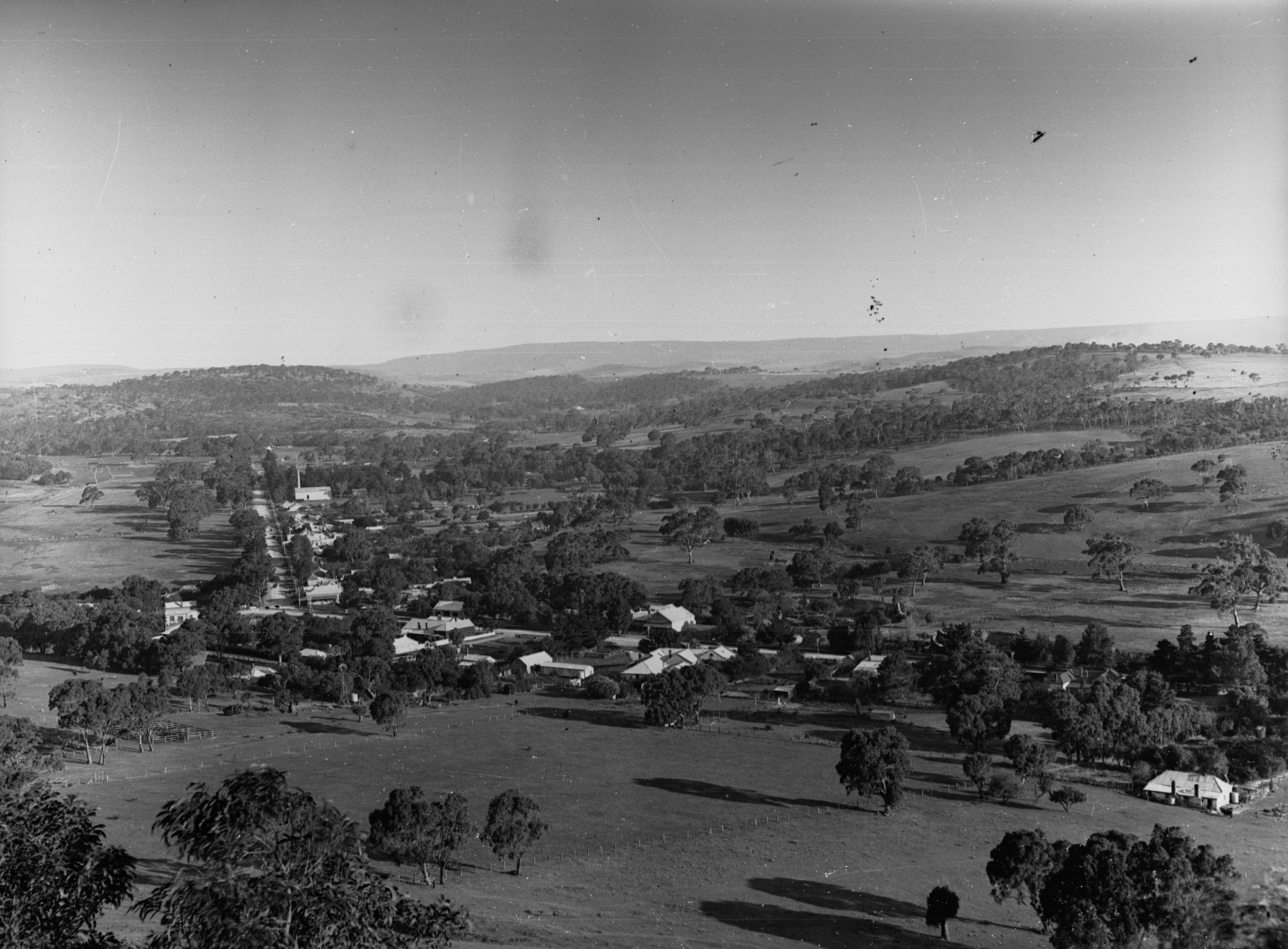
Yankalilla township, ca. 1924

The town grew rapidly between 1850 and 1870 and during this time Yankalilla became one of the five major towns in the colony of South Australia. A jetty was constructed on the coast to export the wheat grown in the district. The district council was officially proclaimed in 1854 and by the late 1860s the Yankalilla and Normanville had three flour mills, five stores, two breweries, four blacksmiths, three hotels and five churches.

The town's Anglican church, 'Christ Church', has a marble font which dates back to the 17th century and once graced Salisbury Cathedral in England. In 1869 the rector of Christ Church, Rev C W Morse, during a visit to England was given the font for his church back in Yankalilla. In 1955 the then rector of Christ Church received a courteous letter from the Curator of the Salisbury, South Wilts and Blackmore Museum mentioning the possibility of the font being returned to Salisbury Cathedral and asking for photographs of the font. Photographs were sent but the font was not.

Another point of interest is the Shrine of Our Lady of Yankalilla in the Anglican church. In August 1994 an image was thought to have become visible on a wall behind the altar of the 137-year-old stone church. It was interpreted at first as an image of the Virgin Mary, then as a Madonna and child, and finally as Mary holding the crucified Christ in the manner of a pietà. Two years after the image appeared on the wall the local press covered the story in the Adelaide Advertiser, bringing international tourists to the town.

There are a number of old buildings in the town dating back to the 1850s and 1860s, including the Yankalilla Hotel and some stone cottages built by Thomas Roads and other early builders. The Anglican church and Hall (a former school) and The Olives on Salt Creek Road are State Heritage listed.

== Geography ==
Yankalilla lies inland on the Fleurieu Peninsula, a small protruding stretch of land south of the Adelaide Plains. It is situated in the valley carved by the Bungala River, which meets the sea at the coast not far from the town, at nearby Normanville. The natural vegetation is dominated by Eucalypts and other southern natives, although grasses and weeds have taken their toll on many species.

=== Geology ===
Most of the region lies on sedimentary rock, with sandstone, mudstone and limestone deposited on an ancient sea floor between 1000 million and 600 million years ago during the Proterozoic. The youngest rocks in the region are in deposits laid down during the Cambrian period (600 to 500 million years ago) when fossils first appeared in the record. Fossils in the Normanville Group of rocks, which outcrop on the coast from Myponga Beach to Carrickalinga, were the first proof of Cambrian-age rocks in the Mount Lofty Ranges.

The area was impacted during the Delamerian Orogeny around 500 Million Years ago, forming mountain ranges, which have long since eroded away. During the Permian ice ages, many of the areas rocks were left with striation pavements, showing the direction of glacial movement, with Glacier Rock at Inman Valley, South Australia a well studied example. During the Triassic, Laterite, an iron-rich formation was deposited, and is now of economic value in road metals.

The landscape came to its present form only around two million years ago, after a period of subsidence, followed by uplift from intraplate movements, the same disturbance that formed the Flinders Ranges.

=== Climate ===
Yankalilla has a warm-summer mediterranean climate (Köppen: Csb), with lukewarm, dry summers and cool, rainy winters. The town is notably cooler and wetter than Adelaide due to the Southern Ocean's influence. Mean maxima vary from 23.7 °C (74.7 °F) in January to 11.7 °C (53.1 °F) in July, while mean minima fluctuate between 3.9 °C (39.0 °F) in January and February and 7.0 °C (44.6 °F) in July. Annual precipitation is moderate, averaging 816.6 mm (32.15 in) between 173.8 precipitation days. Extreme temperatures have ranged from 43.5 °C (110.3 °F) on 24 January 2019 to 1.2 °C (34.2 °F) on 20 July 2015. Since the town has no weather station, climate data was sourced from Parawa, a small settlement 11 kilometres (6.8 mi) south of Yankalilla.

Climate data for Yankalilla (35º34'48"S, 138º17'24"E, 341 m AMSL) (1994-2024 normals and extremes)
Month	Jan	Feb	Mar	Apr	May	Jun	Jul	Aug	Sep	Oct	Nov	Dec	Year
Record high °C (°F)	43.5 (110.3)	40.2 (104.4)	38.2 (100.8)	32.9 (91.2)	25.7 (78.3)	21.6 (70.9)	18.7 (65.7)	21.7 (71.1)	27.3 (81.1)	33.6 (92.5)	38.4 (101.1)	40.3 (104.5)	43.5 (110.3)
Mean daily maximum °C (°F)	23.7 (74.7)	23.2 (73.8)	21.3 (70.3)	18.3 (64.9)	14.9 (58.8)	12.4 (54.3)	11.7 (53.1)	12.5 (54.5)	14.7 (58.5)	16.9 (62.4)	19.4 (66.9)	21.7 (71.1)	17.6 (63.6)
Mean daily minimum °C (°F)	13.9 (57.0)	13.9 (57.0)	13.0 (55.4)	11.3 (52.3)	9.6 (49.3)	7.8 (46.0)	7.0 (44.6)	7.1 (44.8)	8.0 (46.4)	9.0 (48.2)	10.7 (51.3)	12.0 (53.6)	10.3 (50.5)
Record low °C (°F)	7.6 (45.7)	7.9 (46.2)	6.3 (43.3)	4.5 (40.1)	1.8 (35.2)	1.4 (34.5)	1.2 (34.2)	2.1 (35.8)	1.7 (35.1)	2.9 (37.2)	4.4 (39.9)	4.9 (40.8)	1.2 (34.2)
Average precipitation mm (inches)	29.6 (1.17)	29.2 (1.15)	32.0 (1.26)	55.4 (2.18)	95.9 (3.78)	126.3 (4.97)	123.5 (4.86)	100.7 (3.96)	79.8 (3.14)	60.7 (2.39)	43.7 (1.72)	36.0 (1.42)	816.6 (32.15)
Average precipitation days (≥ 0.2 mm)	7.6	7.6	10.1	14.0	18.8	19.7	20.3	20.8	17.2	14.5	12.5	10.7	173.8
Average afternoon relative humidity (%)	58	59	61	67	76	82	82	77	73	68	66	60	69
Average dew point °C (°F)	10.8 (51.4)	11.4 (52.5)	10.2 (50.4)	9.2 (48.6)	9.1 (48.4)	8.0 (46.4)	7.3 (45.1)	7.1 (44.8)	7.7 (45.9)	7.8 (46.0)	9.7 (49.5)	9.7 (49.5)	9.0 (48.2)
Source: Bureau of Meteorology (1994-2024 normals and extremes)

== Economy ==
The economy of the town is based mostly on the surrounding agricultural lands, with industry and tourism also supplementing the town's economy.

Since its establishment, Yankalilla has had cereal crops such as wheat and barley as a major agricultural component, and today this still remains the case. Dairy farming and livestock grazing, including sheep and cattle have also become important to the economy, with dairy products one of the towns biggest exports. Forestry has been attempted in the area and is still occurring in the district.

Tourism has been a rapidly increasing facet of the town economy, with a little over 12,500 tourists visiting the Yankalilla Tourist Information Centre in 2006, a figure increasing at around 12% each year. The Shrine and the country atmosphere draw tourists to the area, with others passing through the town on drives.

== Community ==
Yankalilla has a number of community-based facilities and organisations, including health, education and sporting facilities. There are a number of festivals throughout the year also.

The Southern Fleurieu Health Service covers the town, with no hospital in Yankalilla. The Yankalilla Area school supplies the town's educational needs, with R-12 level teaching. A public library is also located in the town, with membership and borrowing free of charge.

There are many sporting clubs in the town, with Yankalilla having facilities for, and active teams in the local bowls, football (Yankalilla Football Club), netball, cricket, hockey, and tennis leagues. There is also a golf club, gym, and skate park located within the town.

There are a large number of environmental groups in the district, with some based in Yankalilla. Most aim to restore the land to the original conditions, with animal conservation, river and soil monitoring groups well established.

A number of events occur annually, including the Yankalilla Agricultural show, the Easter Art Show and the New Year's Eve Pageant notable. Biennial Festivals are held opposing years, Festival Fleurieu odd years, Heritage Fleurieu Coast Festival even years

The local news service, The Yankalilla News is a free monthly magazine focusing on the Fleurieu Peninsula, and is available throughout the region in shops and directly to post boxes, reaching more than 4500 households in the district.

=== Demographics ===
In the 2001 census by the Australian Bureau of Statistics, it was found that the population of the Yankalilla was 440, with there being nearly exactly the same number of males and females (221 males: 219 females).

The majority of people (343) in the town were born in Australia, with 85 people immigrating from overseas. 75% of those immigrants were from the United Kingdom, with minor amounts coming from other European and South East Asian countries.

The census found Christianity to be the prevalent religion, with 59% subscribing to the religion. Of the Christian faith, Anglican, Lutheran and Catholic were the major denominations. 25% had no religious affiliations, and few people were Buddhists or Muslims.

== Government ==
Yankalilla is located within the local government area known as the District Council of Yankalilla whose mayor is Glen Rowlands since 2014. Yankalilla is located within the State Electoral District of Mawson and the Federal Division of Mayo.

== Transport ==
Yankalilla and its districts can be reached by driving south from Adelaide along Main South Road, or alternatively by taking the Victor Harbor Road, which increases travelling time.

Sealink buses run to Yankalilla.

== Surrounding towns ==
	North: Carrickalinga & Myponga
West: Normanville	Yankalilla	East: Wattle Flat & Torrens Vale; Inman Valley
	South: Hay Flat, Wirrina Cove, Parawa, Second Valley & Rapid Bay
