= Fleurieu Peninsula =

- Coordinates: 35°30′00″S 138°25′48″E
- Country: Australia
- State: South Australia

The Fleurieu Peninsula (locally /ˈflɜːrioʊ/ FLUR-ee-oh) is a peninsula in the Australian state of South Australia located south of the state capital of Adelaide.

== History ==
Before British colonisation of South Australia, the western side of the peninsula was occupied by the Kaurna people, while several clans of the Ngarrindjeri lived on the eastern side. The people were sustained by the flora and fauna of the peninsula, for food and bush medicine. The bulrushes, reeds and sedges were used for basket-weaving or making rope, trees provided wood for spears, and stones were fashioned into tools.

The Fleurieu Peninsula was named after Charles Pierre Claret de Fleurieu, the French explorer and hydrographer, by the French explorer Nicolas Baudin as he explored the south coast of Australia in 1802. The name came into official use in 1911 after Fleurieu's great-nephew, Count Alphonse de Fleurieu, visited Adelaide and met with the Council of the Royal Geographical Society of South Australia, which recommended to the state government that the unnamed peninsula terminating in Cape Jervis be given the name Fleurieu Peninsula "in honour of one who is worthy to be remembered in the annals of Australian geography". The government approved the name later that year.

== Extent ==
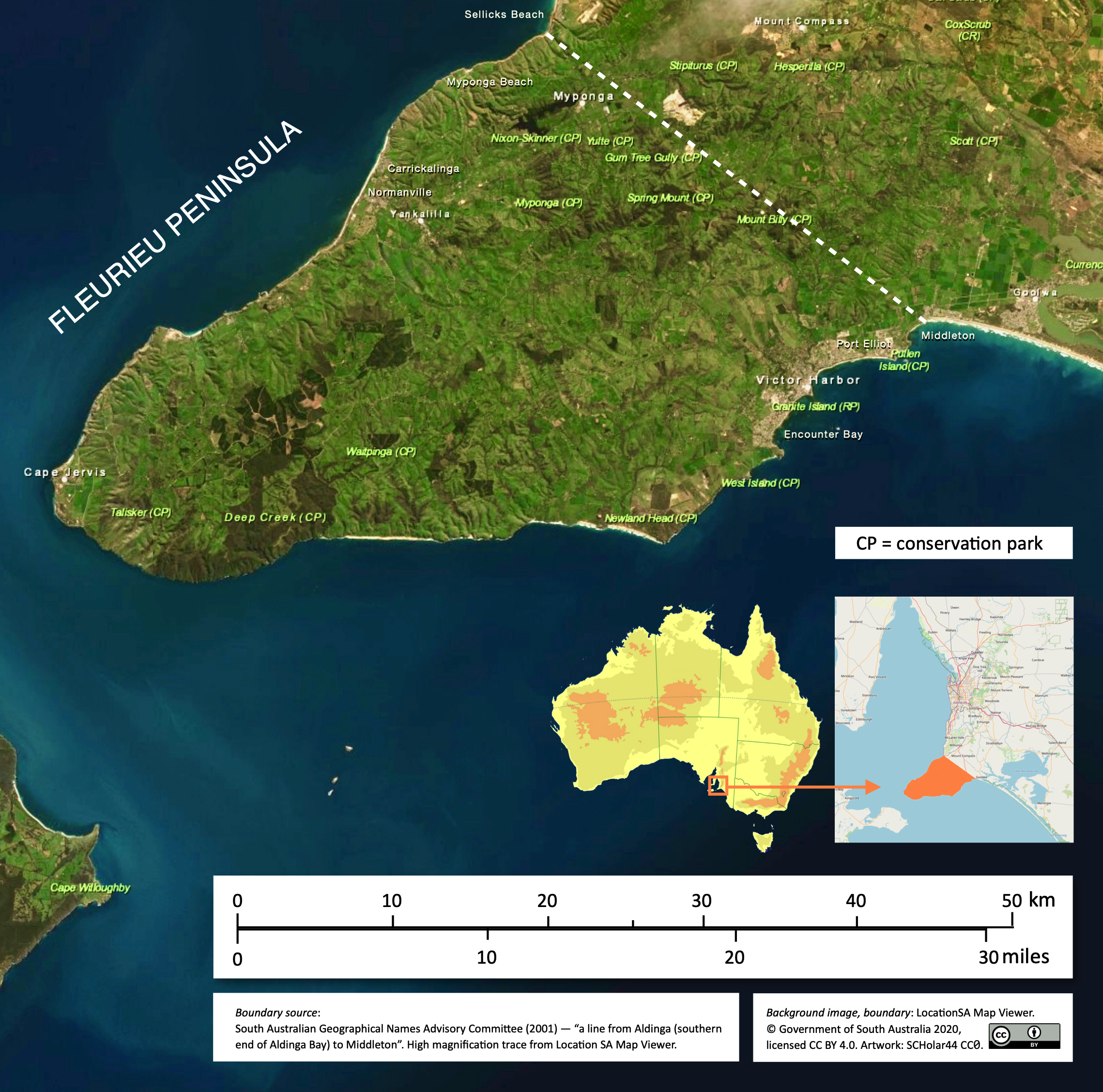
A satellite map of Fleurieu Peninsula

The Geographical Names Advisory Committee advised in 2001 that the extent of the peninsula is:

that portion of land between Gulf St. Vincent and the Southern Ocean (sic), a line from Aldinga (sic) (southern end of Aldinga Bay) to Middleton (eastern end) being the cut-off for the peninsula. This boundary has not to be gazetted at present, and is intended to be the extent of the geographic feature only and is not to be applied to any industry or interest group regional identification.

The coast of the peninsula extends about 140 kilometres (87 mi) from Sellicks Beach in the north to Middleton in the south-east.

== Features ==
Towns on the peninsula include Victor Harbor, Normanville, Yankalilla and Rapid Bay. Districts include Inman Valley and Hindmarsh Valley. A ferry travels between Cape Jervis, at the tip of the peninsula, and Kangaroo Island. There is surfing on both the west and south facing coasts – known locally to Adelaide surfers as the Mid South Coast and the Far South Coast. Surf spots of note include Waitpinga and Middleton on the Far South Coast.

== Flora and fauna ==
In the past, there were extensive swamps and woodlands, which provided habitat and food sources for a range of birds, fish, and other animals, included snake-necked turtles, yabbies, rakali, ducks and black swans. Flora included the native orchid (leek orchid), guinea flower and swamp wattle (Wirilda).

== Ecology and conservation ==
The swamps of the Fleurieu Peninsula were listed as critically endangered under the EPBC Act in 2003; however, there is no adopted or made recovery plan for this ecological community, only "Approved Conservation Advice" (2013). Less than four percent of the original swampland remain today.

A group that includes Aboriginal elders and scientists are as of 2021 documenting Aboriginal cultural knowledge for the Fleurieu Peninsula swamps at Yundi, which is about 40 kilometres (25 mi) south of Adelaide. The Yundi Nature Conservancy, containing about 5 hectares (12 acres) of swamp, is south-east of McLaren Vale, near Mount Compass. There, Ngarrindjeri elders and scientists from various disciplines share their knowledge and plan for rewilding some more of the peninsula. A seed bank has been created to this end.

== See also ==
- Fleurieu zone, wine growing region
- Fleurieu (disambiguation)
