= Aldinga =

Aldinga may also refer to:

- Aldinga, South Australia, a locality
- Aldinga Bay, a bay
- Aldinga Football Club, an Australian rules football club
- Aldinga Airfield, an airfield

== See also ==
- Aldinga Beach, South Australia
- Aldinga Scrub Conservation Park
- Aldinga Reef Aquatic Reserve
