= Myponga =

Myponga may refer to:

== Places in South Australia ==
- Myponga, South Australia, a locality
- Myponga Conservation Park, a protected area
- Myponga Reservoir, a reservoir
- Myponga River, a river
- Myponga Wind Farm, a wind farm
- Hundred of Myponga, a cadastral unit

== Organisations and events in South Australia ==
- Myponga Football Club
- Myponga Pop Festival

== See also ==
- Myponga Beach, South Australia
