= List of shipwrecks in July 1888 =

The list of shipwrecks in July 1888 includes ships sunk, foundered, grounded, or otherwise lost during July 1888.

== 1 July ==
List of shipwrecks: 1 July 1888
Ship	State	Description
Earl of Dumfries	United Kingdom	The ship ran aground and was wrecked off "Punta Cala", Spain.
Resolution	United Kingdom	The steamship was driven ashore near Tangier, Morocco. She was refloated, but then collided with a steamship and a barque. Resolution was taken in to Gibraltar in a severely damaged condition.

== 2 July ==
List of shipwrecks: 2 July 1888
Ship	State	Description
Freia	Norway	The schooner was wrecked on Hilbre Island, Cheshire, United Kingdom with the loss of four of her five crew. She was on a voyage from Kristiansand to Connah's Quay, Flintshire, United Kingdom.
Renfrewshire	United Kingdom	The barque was sighted in the South Atlantic whilst on a voyage from Glasgow, Renfrewshire to Brisbane, Queensland. No further trace, reported missing.
Unnamed	Norway	The barque foundered off the Eilean Glas Lighthouse, Scalpay, Outer Hebrides, United Kingdom. Her crew survived.

== 4 July ==
List of shipwrecks: 4 July 1888
Ship	State	Description
Luize	Germany	The barque collided with the steamship Newcomen (United Kingdom) and sank off the Cabo da Roca, Portugal. Her crew were rescued by Newcomen.

== 5 July ==
List of shipwrecks: 5 July 1888
Ship	State	Description
Ydun	Denmark	The schooner was severely damaged at Wallsend, County Durham, United Kingdom when a railway wagon went through the coal drops and landed on her deck.

== 10 July ==
List of shipwrecks: 10 July 1888
Ship	State	Description
Ann and Betsey	United Kingdom	The smack was driven ashore at Newport, Pembrokeshire.

== 11 July ==
List of shipwrecks: 11 July 1888
Ship	State	Description
Lord Warren	United Kingdom	The steamship caught fire at sea. She completed her voyage to Boston, Massachusetts, United States.
Mary	United Kingdom	The schooner was driven ashore and wrecked at Havre de Grâce, Seine-Inférieure, France. Her crew were rescued by the Havre Lifeboat. She was on a voyage from Charlestown, Cornwall to Rouen, Seine-Inférieure.
Wasp	United Kingdom	The steamship collided with the barque Hypatia (Norway) and sank at Liverpool, Lancashire. Her crew were rescued.

== 12 July ==
List of shipwrecks: 12 July 1888
Ship	State	Description
Mary	United Kingdom	The steam yacht was driven ashore at Dooneermatter Point, County Cork. All seven people on board were rescued. She was refloated and towed in to Ballycotton in a waterlogged condition.
Nellie D. Vaughn	United States	The schooner struck a rock off Watch Hill, Rhode Island, she was beached at Narragansett Beach to prevent sinking in rough seas. She was wrecked and striped.

== 13 July ==
List of shipwrecks: 13 July 1888
Ship	State	Description
Lady of the Lake	United States	The schooner was wrecked on Dawson Shoals, Virginia and striped as a total loss.
Star of Greece	United Kingdom	The clipper came aground close to shore at Port Willunga in South Australia. 18 lives were lost and the ship was lost.

== 14 July ==
List of shipwrecks: 14 July 1888
Ship	State	Description
Cecilie	France	The barque was wrecked on Howland Island. Her crew were rescued by Martaban (Flag unknown).

== 16 July ==
List of shipwrecks: 16 July 1888
Ship	State	Description
Henrietta L.	United States	The schooner was wrecked on St. George Island, Florida.

== 17 July ==
List of shipwrecks: 17 July 1888
Ship	State	Description
Annchen	German Empire	The bark was beached near Cape Hatteras to prevent sinking after springing a leak on the 16th. She became a total loss.
Indra	United Kingdom	The steamship ran aground in the Suez Canal at Ismailia, Egypt.

== 20 July ==
List of shipwrecks: 20 July 1888
Ship	State	Description
Nettlesworth	United Kingdom	The steamship was wrecked on the Stag Rocks, off The Lizard, Cornwall. She was on a voyage from Cardiff, Glamorgan to Kronstadt, Russia.

== 21 July ==
List of shipwrecks: 21 July 1888
Ship	State	Description
Clement	United Kingdom	The steamship caught fire at sea. She was on a voyage from Ceará, Brazil to Liverpool, Lancashire. She put in to Saint Vincent on 4 August and the fire was extinguished the next day. Clement then resumed her voyage.

== 22 July ==
List of shipwrecks: 22 July 1888
Ship	State	Description
Silhet	United Kingdom	The ship was sighted in the South Atlantic whilst on a voyage from New York to Rangoon, Burma. No further trace, reported missing.

== 24 July ==
List of shipwrecks: 24 July 1888
Ship	State	Description
Leeds	United Kingdom	The schooner was run into by the schooner Mary Watkinson (United Kingdom) off Dunwich, Suffolk and was severely damaged. Leeds was assisted in to Lowestoft, Suffolh by the tug Despatch (United Kingdom).

== 25 July ==
List of shipwrecks: 25 July 1888
Ship	State	Description
Alexandra	United Kingdom	The fishing boat foundered in the English Channel off Lancing, Sussex.
Alliance	United Kingdom	The hospital ship sank in the River Tyne, Nobody was aboard at the time.
Beaver	Canada	The wreck of Beaver. The paddle steamer was wrecked when her inebriated crew ran her onto rocks in Burrard Inlet at Prospect Point in Stanley Park in Vancouver, British Columbia. The partially stripped wreck sank in July 1892 when struck by the wake of the passing steamer Yosemite (flag unknown).
Copeland	United Kingdom	The steamship was wrecked on Stroma, Caithness. All 41 people on board survived. She was on a voyage from Iceland to Leith, Lothian.

== 28 July ==
List of shipwrecks: 28 July 1888
Ship	State	Description
Jumbo	United Kingdom	The barque ran aground on the Bahama Bank, in Liverpool Bay. She was refloated and resumed her voyage in a severely leaky condition.

== 29 July ==
List of shipwrecks: 29 July 1888
Ship	State	Description
Marget	Norway	The barque was driven ashore and wrecked at Selsey, Sussex, United Kingdom. Her crew survived. She was on a voyage from Goole, Yorkshire, United Kingdom to Port Natal, Natal Colony.
Robert	United Kingdom	The schooner ran aground on the Bumble Rock, off The Lizard, Cornwall. Her crew survived. She was on a voyage from Port Dinorwic, Caernarfonshire to Southampton, Hampshire.

== Unknown date ==
List of shipwrecks: Unknown date in July 1888
Ship	State	Description
Adela	Chile	The tug sank at Valparaíso between 2 and 10 July.
Agantir	Norway	The barque was wrecked at Macau, Brazil. She was on a voyage from Macau to Rio de Janeiro.
Alleida	Norway	The barque was wrecked at Danger Point, Cape Colony. Her crew were rescued.
Annchen	Germany	The brig was driven ashore and wrecked at Cape Hatteras, Virginia, United States. Her crew were rescued. She was on a voyage from Savannah, Georgia, United States to Glasgow, Renfrewshire, United Kingdom.
Atlantis	United Kingdom	The ship was driven ashore at St. Barbes, Newfoundland Colony. She was condemned.
Belle	France	The ship was driven ashore at "Kobberdyet", Denmark. She was refloated and towed in to Korsør, Denmark.
Bessie	United Kingdom	The barque was driven ashore and wrecked on St. Catherines Island, Georgia, United States.
Border Chief	Germany	The barque was abandoned in the Atlantic Ocean. Her crew were rescued. She was on a voyage from Sharpness, Gloucestershire, United Kingdom to Melbourne, Victoria.
Caraibe	France	The steamship was wrecked at Étel, Morbihan. Her crew were rescued.
Carrara	Flag unknown	The ship was lost on the east coast of the United States.
Charite	France	The barque was driven ashore in Vaulin Bay, Martinique. She was a total loss.
Ciareen	United Kingdom	The ship ran aground at Westport, County Mayo. She was on a voyage from Wesport to the Clyde.
Copeland	United Kingdom	The steamship was driven ashore on Stroma, Caithness. Her passengers were taken off. She was on a voyage from Iceland to Leith, Lothian. She broke in two on 30 July and was a total loss.
Cremona	United Kingdom	The ship was driven ashore in the Pentland Firth. She was later refloated and resumed her voyage.
Elly	Russia	The schooner foundered off Seskar. Her crew were rescued by Elizabeth (Flag unknown).
Enrico	Italy	The barque collided with the barque Catarina R. (United Kingdom) and sank in the Atlantic Ocean. Her crew were rescued by Catarina R.. Enrico was on a voyage from Cardiff, Glamorgan, United Kingdom to Buenos Aires, Argentina.
Etoile du Nord	France	The barque ran aground at "Banco Chico", Argentina. She was on a voyage from Cardiff to Buenos Aires. She was refloated and taken in to Buenos Aires.
Fernholme	United Kingdom	The steamship was driven ashore on the coast of the Newfoundland Colony. She was consequently condemned.
Fortescue	United Kingdom	The steamship ran aground off the Finngrundet Lightship (Sweden). She was refloated and taken in to Öregrund, Sweden.
Fox	United Kingdom	The steamship was driven ashore on the east coast of Herm, Channel Islands.
Gate City	United States	The steamship was driven ashore at Savannah.
Glenmore	United Kingdom	The barque was wrecked at Valparaíso.
Holsatia	Germany	The schooner was abandoned at sea. Her crew were rescued.
Island Queen	United Kingdom	The barque foundered in the Atlantic Ocean. Her crew were rescued. She was on a voyage from Cardiff to the River Plate.
Jane Marie	United Kingdom	The barque was abandoned in the Atlantic Ocean. Her crew were rescued. She was on a voyage from Swansea, Glamorgan to Port Natal, Natal Colony.
Jason	United Kingdom	The yacht was driven ashore. She was later refloated and taken in to Portland, Dorset.
Lady Bertha	United Kingdom	The steamship was driven ashore on Öland, Sweden. She was refloated and taken in to Stockholm in a leaky condition.
Magnos	Sweden	The schooner ran aground on the Lillegrunden, in the Baltic Sea. She was on a voyage from Dordrecht, South Holland, Netherlands to Riga, Russia.
Martha	Flag unknown	The barque sank at Valparaíso between 2 and 10 July.
Mazeppa	Norway	The ship was driven ashore and wrecked on Seal Island, Nova Scotia, Canada. She was on a voyage from Saint John, New Brunswick, Canada to Cork, United Kingdom.
Norman	Sweden	The steamship was driven ashore. She was on a voyage from Bergen, Norway to Stettin, Germany. She was refloated and taken in to Kristiansand, Norway in a leaky condition and was placed under repair.
Princess	United Kingdom	The steamship was driven ashore at Östergarn, Gotland, Sweden. She subsequently broke in two and was a total loss.
Tallahassie	United States	The ship was damaged by fire at New York.
Themis D	Italy	The barque ran aground in the River Plate. She was on a voyage from San Nicolás, Argentina to the English Channel. She was a total loss.
Thor	Norway	The barque was driven ashore at Musquodoboit Harbour, Nova Scotia. She was a total loss.
Torbay	United Kingdom	The steamship was driven ashore at Torremolinos, Spain. She was on a voyage from Taganrog, Russia to Antwerp, Belgium. She was refloated with assistance from the steamship William Haynes (United Kingdom) and resumed her voyage.
Unity	United Kingdom	The barque was driven ashore at Chegoggin, Nova Scotia. She was on a voyage from Boston, Massachusetts, United States to Miramichi, New Brunswick.
William A. Dugoswue	United States	The schooner was wrecked on Straitsmouth Island, Rockport, Massachusetts.
Unnamed	Netherlands	The ship ran aground and sank on the Maplin Sands, in the North Sea off the coast of Essex, United Kingdom.
