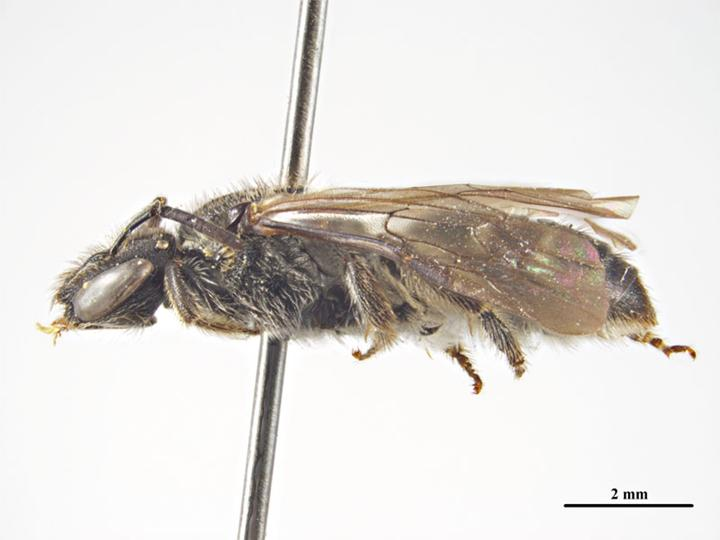
- Female
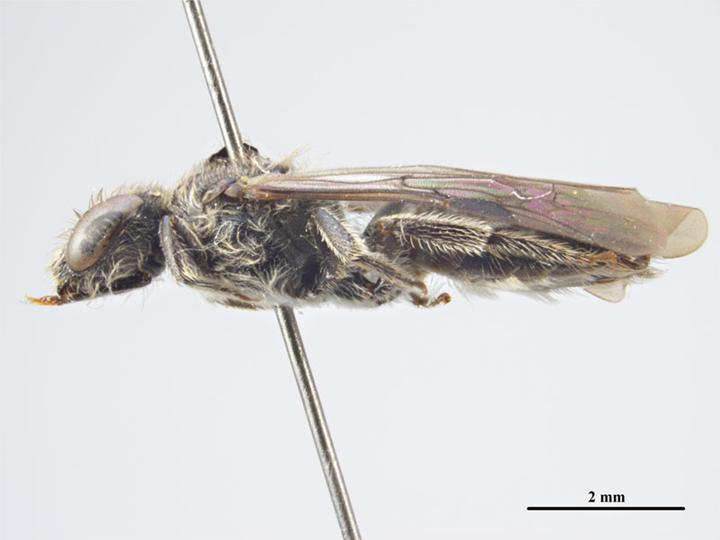
- Male

Scientific classification
- Kingdom: Animalia
- Phylum: Arthropoda
- Clade: Pancrustacea
- Class: Insecta
- Order: Hymenoptera
- Family: Halictidae
- Genus: Lasioglossum
- Species: L. littleri

Binomial name
- Lasioglossum littleri (Cockerell, 1914)

Synonyms
- Halictus littleri Cockerell, 1914; Parasphecodes infrahirtus Cockerell, 1920; Halictus obscuripes Friese, 1924

= Lasioglossum littleri =

Species of bee

Lasioglossum littleri, or Lasioglossum (Chilalictus) littleri, is a species of bee in the family Halictidae and subfamily Halictinae. It is endemic to Australia. It was described by British-American entomologist Theodore Dru Alison Cockerell in 1914.

== Description ==
Female body length is about 8.5 mm. Integumental colouration is mainly black, with bands of greyish fur on the abdomen.

== Distribution and habitat ==
The species occurs in south-eastern Australia. Type localities include Adelaide, as well as Launceston, Tasmania.

== Behaviour ==
The adults are flying mellivores that nest communally in soil. Flowering plants visited by the bees include Acacia, Callistemon, Calytrix, Cheiranthera, Cotoneaster, Daviesia, Dillwynia, Diplarrena, Eucalyptus, Grevillea, Hakea, Leptospermum, Leucopogon, Mesembryanthemum, Veronica, Platylobium and Xanthorrhoea species.
