= Willunga South, South Australia =

Willunga South
- Suburb
- Coordinates: 35°17′15″S 138°33′21″E
- Country: Australia
- State: South Australia
- Region: Southern Adelaide
- City: Adelaide
- LGA: City of Onkaparinga
- Location: 48 km (30 mi) from Adelaide
- Established: 1879

Government
  - State electorate: Mawson
  - Federal division: Kingston

Population
  - Total: 470 (SAL 2021)
- Postcode: 5172
- County: Adelaide
- Mean max temp: 19.4 °C (66.9 °F)
- Mean min temp: 7.5 °C (45.5 °F)
- Annual rainfall: 756.3 mm (29.78 in)
Suburbs around Willunga South
Whites Valley	Whites Valley; Willunga	Willunga
Sellicks Hill	Willunga South	Willunga Hill
Myponga	Pages Flat	Willunga Hill

Willunga South is a town south of Adelaide, South Australia in the City of Onkaparinga local government area. Willunga South is established in the Sellicks Hill Range and is located at the base of Delabole Hill. It is approximately 48 km from the Adelaide CBD.
