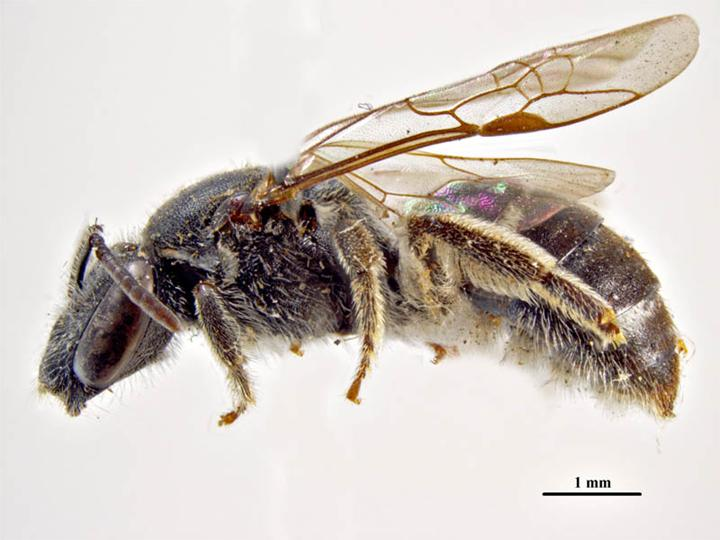
- Female

Scientific classification
- Kingdom: Animalia
- Phylum: Arthropoda
- Clade: Pancrustacea
- Class: Insecta
- Order: Hymenoptera
- Family: Halictidae
- Genus: Lasioglossum
- Species: L. convexum

Binomial name
- Lasioglossum convexum Smith, 1879

Synonyms
- Halictus convexus Smith, 1879; Halictus griseovittatus Cockerell, 1914; Halictus bursariae Cockerell, 1916; Halictus mjobergi Friese, 1917; Halictus euryurus Cockerell, 1930

= Lasioglossum convexum =

Species of bee

Lasioglossum convexum, or Lasioglossum (Chilalictus) convexum, is a species of bee in the family Halictidae and subfamily Halictinae. It is endemic to Australia. It was described by English entomologist Frederick Smith in 1879.

== Distribution and habitat ==
The species occurs in eastern Australia. Type localities include Kelvin Grove in Queensland and Adaminaby in New South Wales.

== Behaviour ==
The adults are flying mellivores. Flowering plants visited by the bees include Aotus, Bursaria, Cakile, Cheiranthera, Eucalyptus, Hakea, Hibbertia, Jacksonia, Kunzea, Leptospermum, Melaleuca, Oxalis, Pultenaea, Schinus, Solanum, Taraxacum and Xanthorrhoea species.

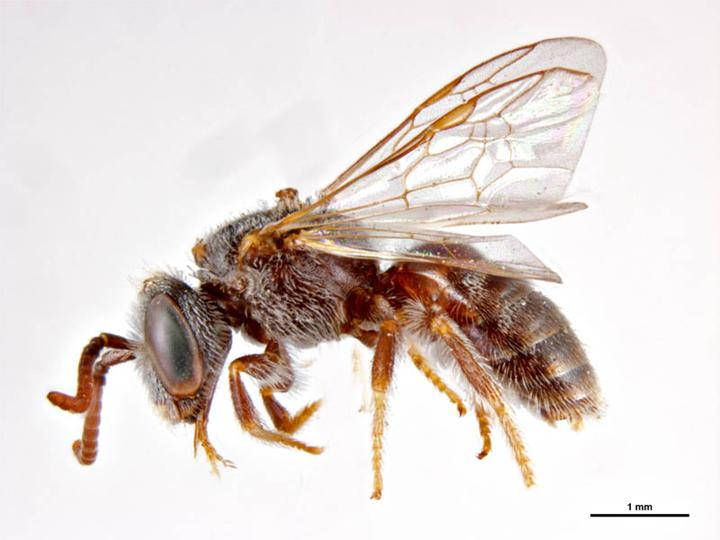
Male
