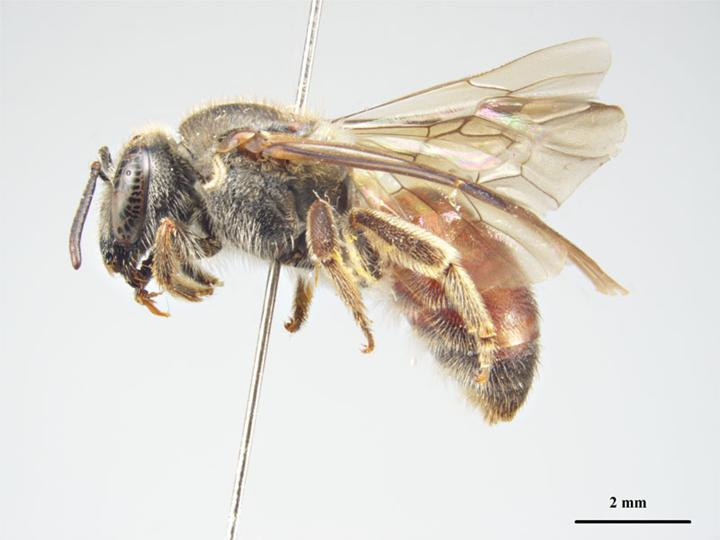
- Female

Scientific classification
- Kingdom: Animalia
- Phylum: Arthropoda
- Clade: Pancrustacea
- Class: Insecta
- Order: Hymenoptera
- Family: Halictidae
- Genus: Lasioglossum
- Species: L. loweri

Binomial name
- Lasioglossum loweri (Cockerell, 1905)

Synonyms
- Parasphecodes loweri Cockerell, 1905

= Lasioglossum loweri =

Species of bee

Lasioglossum loweri, or Lasioglossum (Parasphecodes) loweri, is a species of bee in the family Halictidae and subfamily Halictinae. It is endemic to Australia. It was described by British-American entomologist Theodore Dru Alison Cockerell in 1905.

== Description ==
Female body length is about 9.5 mm. Integumental colouration is mainly black, with the first three segments of the abdomen chestnut-red.

== Distribution and habitat ==
The species occurs in South Australia. The type locality is Adelaide.

== Behaviour ==
The adults are flying mellivores. Flowering plants visited by the bees include Eucalyptus, Bursaria and Cheiranthera species.

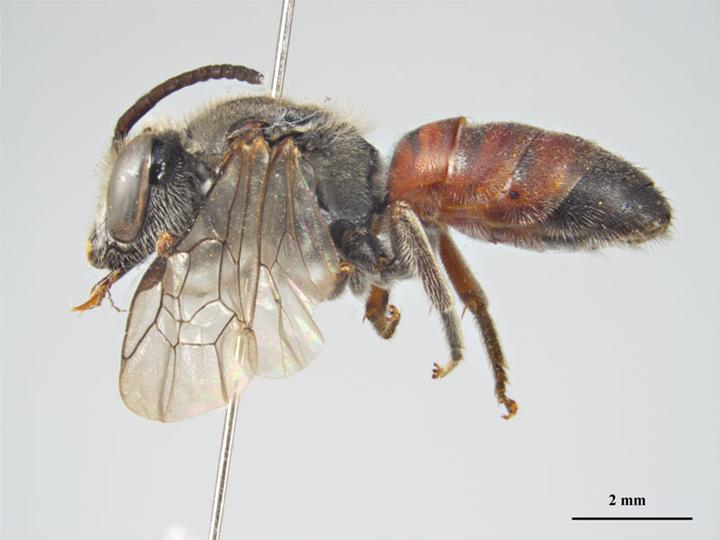
Male
