= Myponga Conservation Park =

Protected area in South Australia

- IUCN category III (natural monument or feature)
- Location within South Australia
- Location: South Australia, Myponga
- Nearest city: Myponga
- Coordinates: 35°26′50″S 138°26′23″E
- Area: 1.67 km^{2} (0.64 sq mi)
- Established: 24 February 1972
- Governing body: Department for Environment and Water

Myponga Conservation Park (formerly the Myponga National Park) is a protected area located in the Australian state of South Australia in the locality of Myponga about 59 kilometres (37 mi) south of the state capital of Adelaide and about 5 kilometres (3.1 mi) south-south-west of the town of Myponga.

The conservation park consists of land in the sections 269 and 270 in the cadastral unit of the Hundred of Myponga. The land first received protected area status as the Myponga National Park proclaimed on 24 February 1972 under the National Parks Act 1966. On 27 April 1972, the national park was reconstituted under the National Parks and Wildlife Act 1972 as the Myponga Conservation Park. As of 2018, it covered an area of 1.67 square kilometres (0.64 sq mi).

The Heysen Trail, the long-distance walking trail, enters from the south at the south-east corner of section 269 and passes through and along the west side of the section.

In 1980, the conservation park was described as follows:

Myponga Conservation Park preserves an area with a diverse and interesting flora that supports a mammalian and avian fauna representative of that of the Fleurieu Peninsula of particular note is the presence of the locally endangered short-nosed bandicoot (Isoodon obesulus) and the rare plants Casuarina striata and Cheiranthera cyanea… This park which occupies hilly terrain typical of the Fleurieu Peninsula, contains a diverse flora that falls into three main structural forms. The areas of better soils near creeks and along ridges have a low open forest of Eucalyptus leucoxylon and obliqua. Open scrub of E. cosmophylla with depauperate E. fasciculosa and E. leucoxylon over a dense understorey of Hakea, Banksia and Xanthorrhoea series covers the hill slope areas with patches of closed heath of the same species… Myponga Conservation Park is substantially undisturbed although surrounded by cultural environments.

The conservation park is classified as an IUCN Category III protected area. In 1980, it was listed on the now-defunct Register of the National Estate.

== See also ==
- Protected areas of South Australia
