= Myponga River =

Myponga
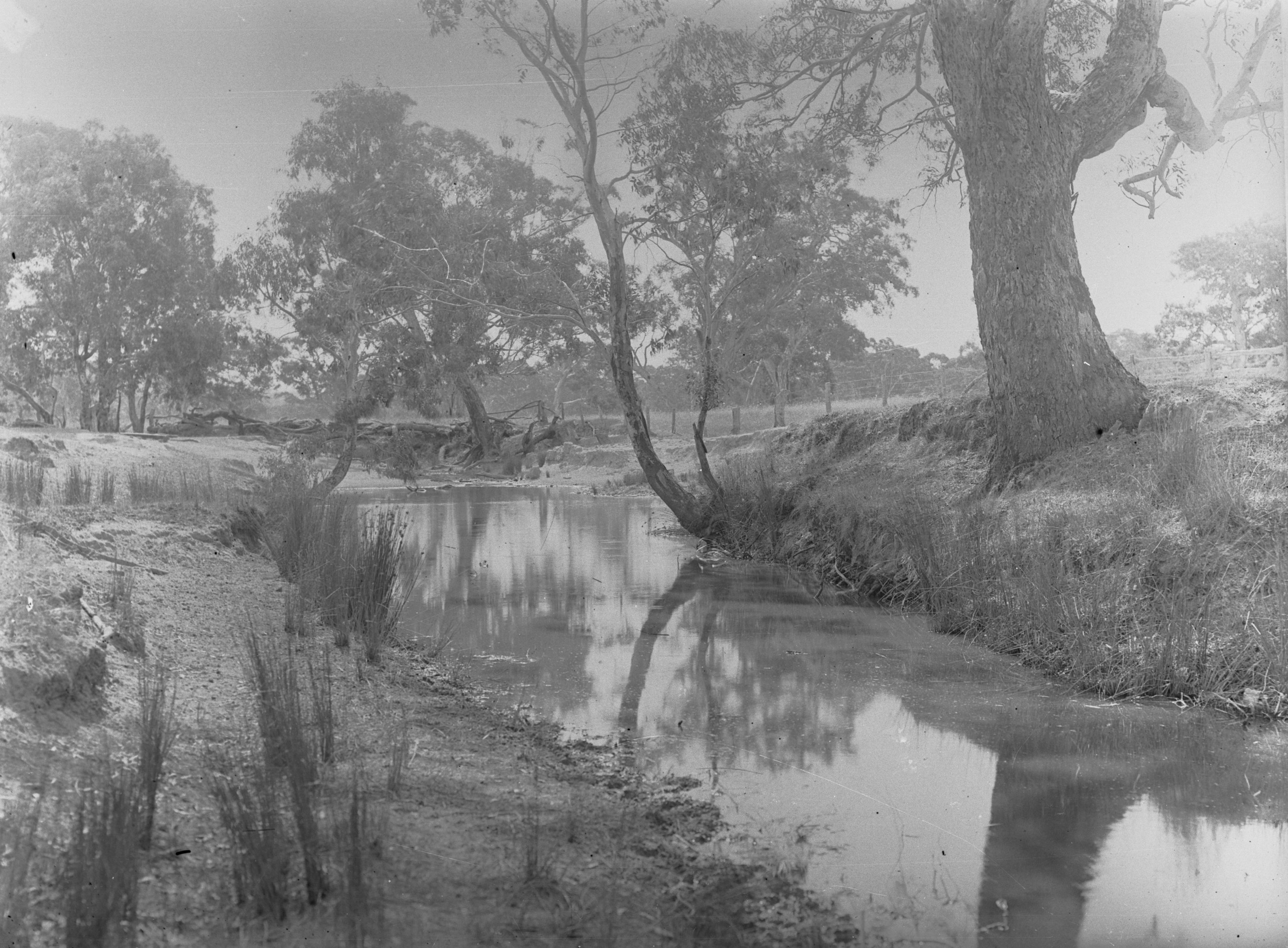
- Myponga River, 1925

- Location of the river mouth in South Australia
- Etymology: Myponga

Location
- Country: Australia
- State: South Australia
- Region: Fleurieu Peninsula

Physical characteristics
- Source: Mount Lofty Range
  - location: Willunga Hill
  - coordinates: 35.292°S 138.585°E
- Mouth: Gulf St Vincent
  - location: Myponga Beach
  - coordinates: 35°22′20″S 138°23′04″E
  - elevation: 0 m (0 ft)
- Basin size: 138.59 km^{2} (53.51 sq mi)

The Myponga River is a stream on the north-western side of the Fleurieu Peninsula in the Australian state of South Australia.

== See also ==
- Myponga Reservoir
- List of rivers of Australia § South Australia
