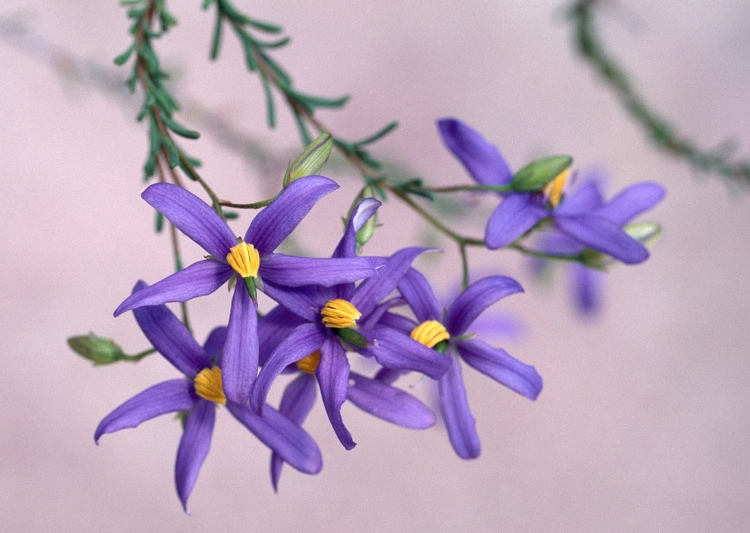

Scientific classification
- Kingdom: Plantae
- Clade: Tracheophytes
- Clade: Angiosperms
- Clade: Eudicots
- Clade: Asterids
- Order: Apiales
- Family: Pittosporaceae
- Genus: Cheiranthera
- Species: C. brevifolia

Binomial name
- Cheiranthera brevifolia F.Muell.

= Cheiranthera brevifolia =

Species of plant

Cheiranthera brevifolia, is a small upright, sparsely branched shrub. It has smooth stems, 0.2 m (7.9 in) high and sparsely branched. It grows in gravelly sand, laterite and granite on undulating hillsides near Esperance and Albany in Western Australia.
