= Whites Valley, South Australia =

Whites Valley
- Suburb
- Coordinates: 35°16′14″S 138°30′59″E
- Country: Australia
- State: South Australia
- Region: Southern Adelaide
- City: Adelaide
- LGA: City of Onkaparinga
- Location: 39 km (24 mi) from Adelaide

Government
  - State electorate: Mawson
  - Federal division: Mayo

Population
  - Total: 313 (SAL 2021)
- Time zone: UTC+9:30 (ACST)
  - Summer (DST): UTC+10:30 (ACST)
- Postcode: 5172
- County: Adelaide
- Mean max temp: 21.8 °C (71.2 °F)
- Mean min temp: 12.8 °C (55.0 °F)
- Annual rainfall: 448.4 mm (17.65 in)
Suburbs around Whites Valley
Aldinga	Tatachilla	McLaren Vale
Aldinga	Whites Valley	Willunga; Willunga South
Aldinga	Sellicks Hill; Willunga South	Willunga South

Whites Valley is a semi-rural suburb of Adelaide, South Australia. It is home to many vineyards.

The 2016 Australian census which was conducted in August 2016 reports that Whites Valley had 295 people living within its boundaries.

Whites Valley is located in the federal division of Mayo, the state electoral district of Mawson and the local government area of the City of Onkaparinga.
