= Yulte Conservation Park =

Protected area in South Australia

- IUCN category III (natural monument or feature)
- Location within South Australia
- Location: South Australia
- Nearest city: Myponga
- Coordinates: 35°24′50″S 138°28′43″E
- Area: 41 ha (100 acres)
- Established: 24 January 1974
- Governing body: Department for Environment and Water

Yulte Conservation Park is a protected area located in the Australian state of South Australia in the locality of Myponga about 55 kilometres (34 mi) south of the state capital of Adelaide and about 2.5 kilometres (1.6 mi) south-south-east of the town of Myponga.

The conservation park consists of land in section 268 in the cadastral unit of the Hundred of Myponga. It came into existence on 24 January 1974 by proclamation under the National Parks and Wildlife Act 1972. As of 2016, it covered an area of 41 hectares (100 acres).

In 1980, it was described as follows:

A small park in steep, hilly terrain vegetated with open forest of Eucalyptus baxteri in association with E. Obliqua, E Leucoxylon and E Fasciculosa in the valleys. This association grades through to a scrub / heath of E. baxteri / E. osmophylla on the ridges. The understorey is typically a dense heath dominated by Xanthorrhoea, Pultenaea and Casuarina species, with Banksia ornata confined to the ridges. A wide diversity of bird species typical of the Adelaide hills area is represented in the park, including the uncommon beautiful firetail. The park is in a minimally disturbed condition, however its small size and cleared surrounds make it susceptible to deleterious external influences.

The conservation park is classified as an IUCN Category III protected area. In 1980, it was listed on the now-defunct Register of the National Estate.

== See also ==
- Protected areas of South Australia
