= Sellicks Beach, South Australia =

Sellicks Beach
- Suburb
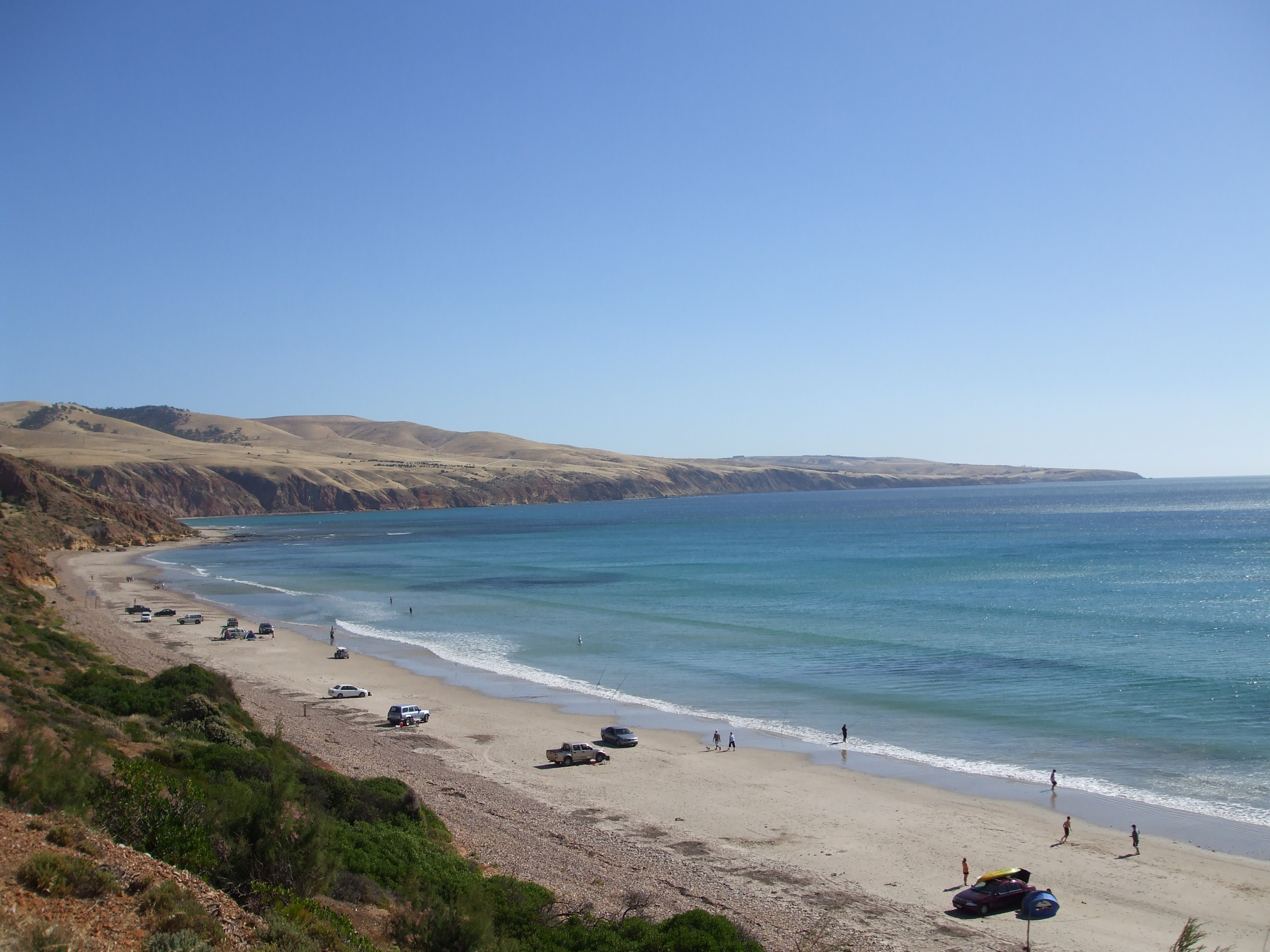
- Sellicks Beach south

- Interactive map of Sellicks Beach
- Country: Australia
- State: South Australia
- Region: Southern Adelaide
- City: Adelaide
- LGA: City of Onkaparinga
- Location: 47 km (29 mi) S of Adelaide
- Established: 1925 (sub-division)

Government
  - State electorate: Finniss
  - Federal division: Mayo

Population
  - Total: 2,705 (SAL 2021)
- Time zone: UTC+9:30 (ACST)
  - Summer (DST): UTC+10:30 (ACDT)
- Postcode: 5174
- County: Adelaide
- Mean max temp: 19.4 °C (66.9 °F)
- Mean min temp: 7.5 °C (45.5 °F)
- Annual rainfall: 756.3 mm (29.78 in)
Suburbs around Sellicks Beach
Gulf St Vincent	Aldinga Beach	Sellicks Hill
Gulf St Vincent	Sellicks Beach	Sellicks Hill
Gulf St Vincent	Sellicks Hill	Sellicks Hill

Sellicks Beach, formerly spelt Sellick's Beach, is a suburb in the Australian state of South Australia located within Adelaide metropolitan area about 47 kilometres (29 mi) from the Adelaide city centre. It is an outer southern suburb of Adelaide and is located in the local government area of the City of Onkaparinga at the southern boundary of the metropolitan area. It is known as Witawali or Witawodli by the traditional owners, the Kaurna people, and is of significance as being the site of a freshwater spring said to be created by the tears of Tjilbruke, the creator being.

The beach lies within Aldinga Bay. The suburb consists of land bounded in the north by Button Road, in the east by the Main South Road, to the south by the boundary of the cadastral unit of the Hundred of Willunga and to the west by the coastline with Aldinga Bay. The 2016 Australian census reported that Sellicks Beach had 2,616 people living within its boundaries.

== History ==
Before the British colonisation of South Australia, the Sellicks Beach area, along with most of the Adelaide plains area and down the western side of the Fleurieu Peninsula, was inhabited by the Kaurna people. There is a significant site associated with the Kaurna Dreaming of the creator ancestor Tjilbruke, with a commemorative plaque on the end of Francis Street on the Esplanade. This was unveiled in 1986, the year of the South Australian sesquicentenary, as part of the Tjilbruke Dreaming Track.

The name originated in 1925 as a sub-division of part of section 665 of the cadastral unit of the Hundred of Willunga called "Sellicks Beach Estate", which was developed by George and Robert Herrick, two farmers who lived at Aldinga.

Sellicks Beach was gazetted as a place on 28 October 1993.

== Description and facilities ==
There is a post office, delicatessen and a wholesale nursery. Sellicks Beach is also close to Aldinga Beach, which has three petrol stations, two supermarkets, bakery, doctor's surgery, two chemists and other various shops.

== Motor vehicles on the beach ==
Organised motorcycle racing on the beach was held as early as 1917, with annual speed trials being held during summer until 1953 and with re-enactments in both 1986 and 1992. Annual racing resumed in 2017 after a 20-year period of no activity.

Driving motor vehicles onto the beach is permitted free of charge for residents, while non-residents are charged a small fee.
