= Sellicks Hill, South Australia =

Sellicks Hill
- Suburb
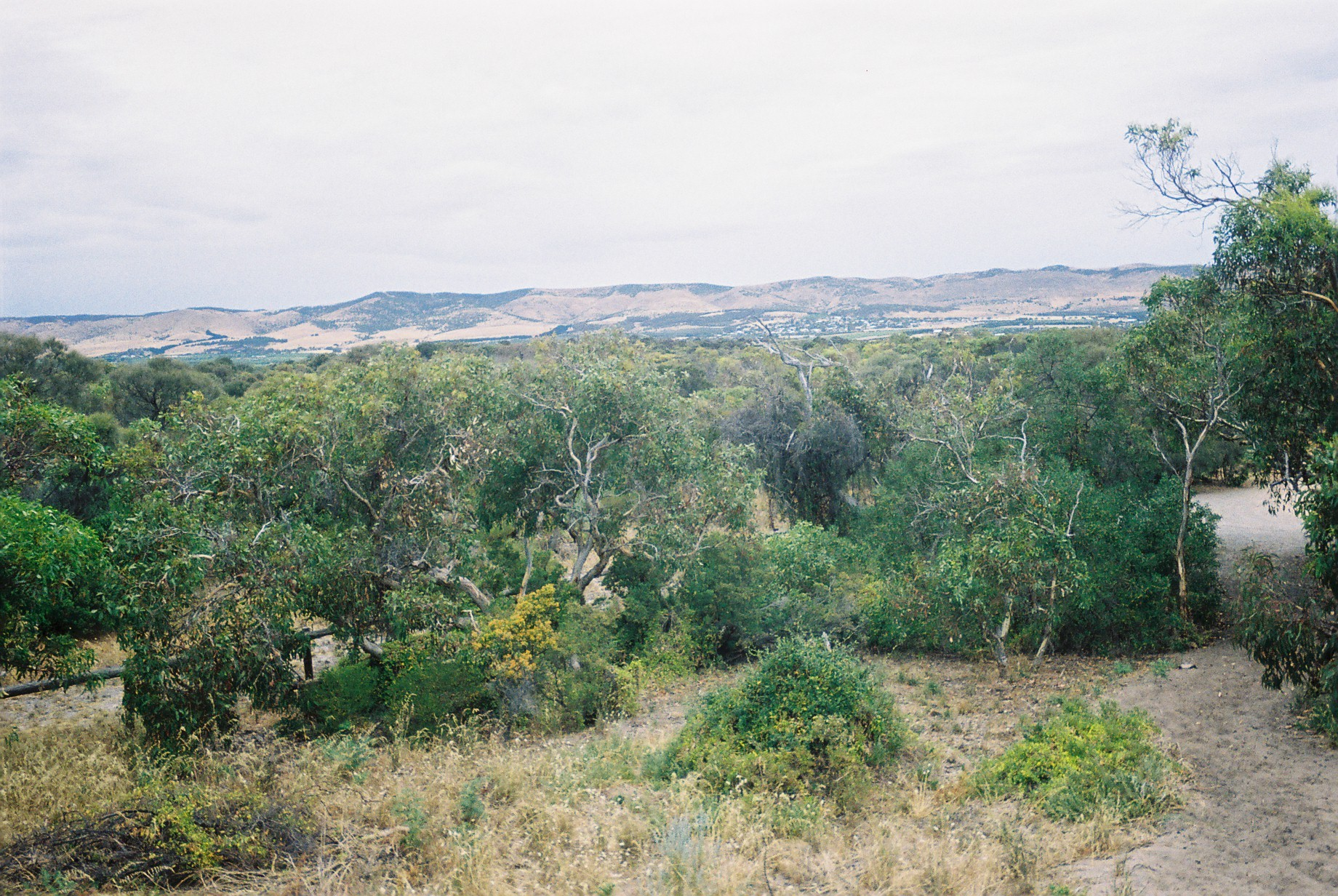
- The Willunga Scarp

- Coordinates: 35°20′S 138°28′E
- Country: Australia
- State: South Australia
- Region: Fleurieu and Kangaroo Island; Southern Adelaide
- LGA: City of Onkaparinga District Council of Yankalilla
- Location: 48 km (30 mi) South of Adelaide city centre
- Established: 1999

Government
  - State electorate: Mawson

Population
  - Total: 299 (SAL 2021)
- Postcode: 5174
- County: Adelaide
- Mean max temp: 19.4 °C (66.9 °F)
- Mean min temp: 7.5 °C (45.5 °F)
- Annual rainfall: 751.3 mm (29.58 in)
Suburbs around Sellicks Hill
Aldinga Beach	Aldinga; Whites Valley	Whites Valley
Aldinga Beach; Sellicks Beach; Gulf St Vincent	Sellicks Hill	Willunga South; Pages Flat
Gulf St Vincent; Myponga Beach	Myponga Beach; Myponga	Pages Flat
- Location; Climate; Adjoining suburbs

Sellicks Hill – formerly spelt Sellick's Hill – is a semi-rural suburb of Adelaide, South Australia. It lies within both the City of Onkaparinga and the District Council of Yankalilla. Before the British colonisation of South Australia, the Sellicks Hill area (along with most of the Adelaide plains area and down the western side of the Fleurieu Peninsula), was inhabited by the Kaurna people. Sellick's Hill Post Office opened on 2 July 1860.
