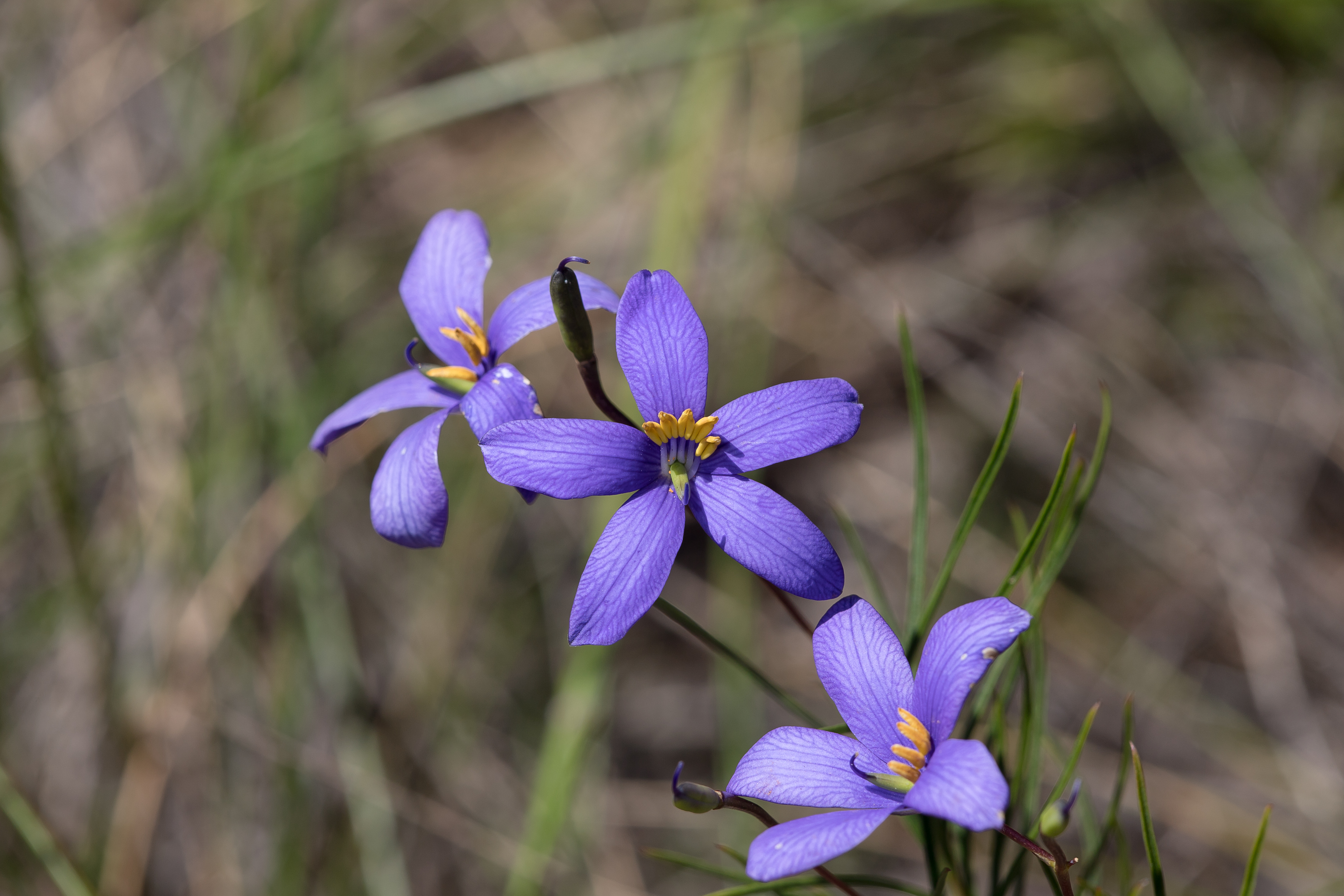
- Cheiranthera alternifolia

Scientific classification
- Kingdom: Plantae
- Clade: Tracheophytes
- Clade: Angiosperms
- Clade: Eudicots
- Clade: Asterids
- Order: Apiales
- Family: Pittosporaceae
- Genus: Cheiranthera
- Species: C. alternifolia

Binomial name
- Cheiranthera alternifolia E.M.Benn.

= Cheiranthera alternifolia =

Finger-flower

Species of plant

Cheiranthera alternifolia, commonly known as finger-flower, is a flowering plant in the family Pittosporaceae. It is a small shrub with deep bluish-purple flowers, yellow stamens and dull green linear shaped leaves. It is found growing in South Australia.

== Description ==
Cheiranthera alternifolia is a small understory, scrambling, perennial shrub to 50 cm (20 in) with smooth stems. The leaves are linear 7–60 mm (0.28–2.36 in) long, 0.75–1.5 mm (0.030–0.059 in) wide, arranged alternately, usually evenly spaced along stems and margins rolled under. The flowers may be single or in clusters of 2-11, peduncles 17–55 mm (0.67–2.17 in) long, pedicels 4–25 mm (0.16–0.98 in) long, stems and 5 yellow stamens. The petals may be pale to deep bluish-purple, lanceolate, 4–8 mm (0.16–0.31 in) long and 5–8 mm (0.20–0.31 in) wide. The fruit capsules are more or less oblong to egg-shaped, 12–18 mm (0.47–0.71 in) long and flattened. Flowering occurs from October to November.

== Taxonomy and naming ==
The species was first formally described in 1978 by Eleanor Marion Bennett and the description was published in Nuytsia. The specific epithet (alternifolia) is derived from the Latin alternus meaning "alternate" and -folius meaning "leaved".

== Distribution ==
Finger-flower is a common, endemic species in southern locations of South Australia, from the southern parts of the Eyre Peninsula to the south-east and Kangaroo Island. It was previously found in Victoria but is now presumed extinct in that State.
