= Aldinga, South Australia =

Aldinga
- Suburb
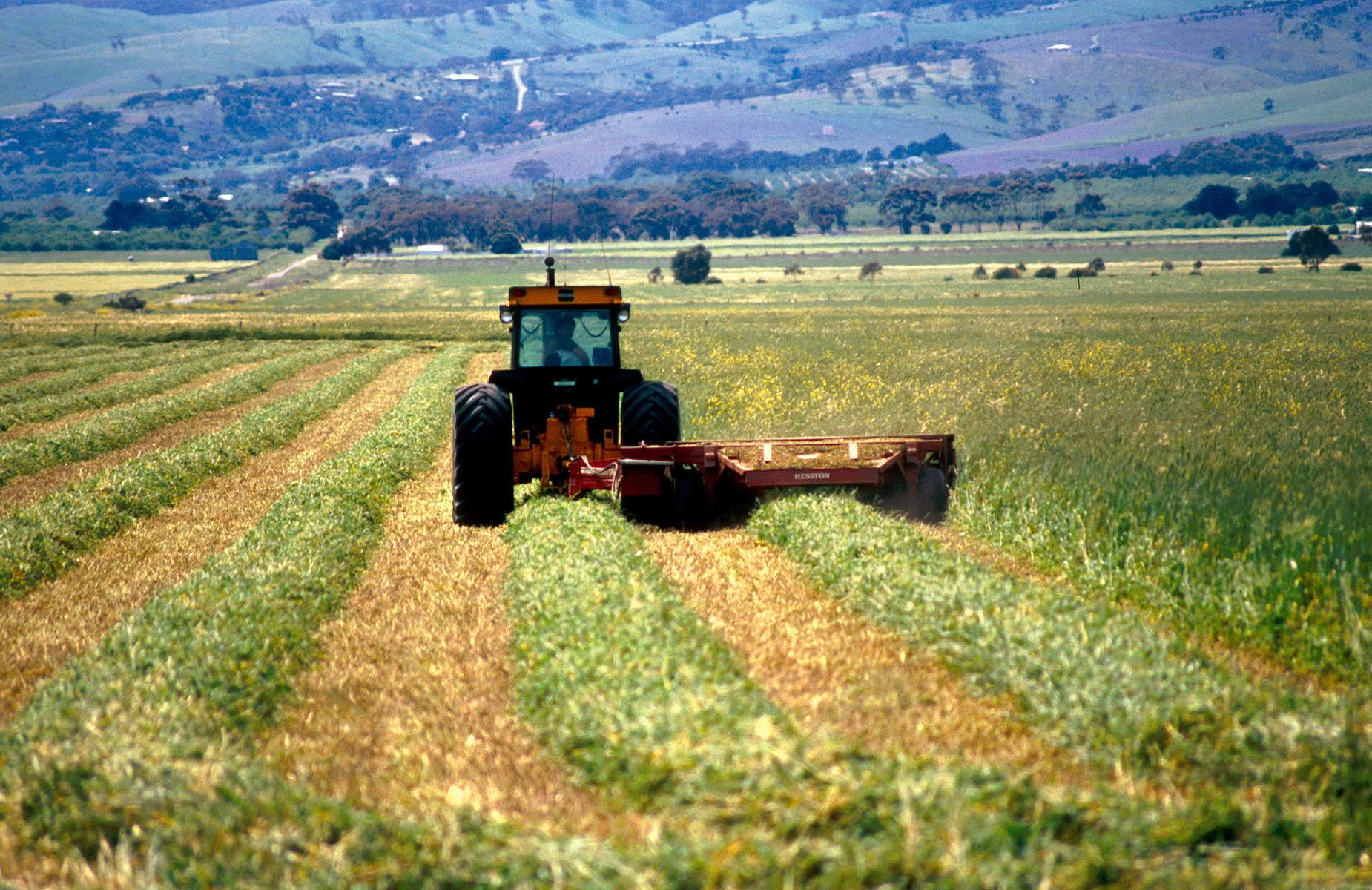
- Cutting hay near Aldinga, south of Adelaide in South Australia, 1992

- Coordinates: 35.267°S 138.483°E
- Country: Australia
- State: South Australia
- Region: Southern Adelaide
- LGA: City of Onkaparinga
- Established: 1857

Government
  - State electorate: Kaurna Mawson
  - Federal division: Mayo

Population
  - Total: 764 (SAL 2021)
- Postcode: 5173
- County: Adelaide
- Mean max temp: 21.7 °C (71.1 °F)
- Mean min temp: 12.8 °C (55.0 °F)
- Annual rainfall: 448.7 mm (17.67 in)
Suburbs around Aldinga
Maslin Beach	Maslin Beach	Tatachilla
Port Willunga	Aldinga	Whites Valley
Aldinga Beach	Sellicks Hill	Sellicks Hill
- Climate; Adjoining suburbs

Aldinga /ɔːlˈdɪŋɡə/ is a suburb of Adelaide in South Australia located about 45 kilometres (28 miles) south of the Adelaide city centre in the City of Onkaparinga. It is a small suburb (population around 764 in 2021), about a kilometre east of the edge of the larger suburb of Aldinga Beach, and about 3 km (1.9 mi) from the beachfront.

== History ==
=== Aboriginal use ===
Before British colonisation of South Australia, the Kaurna people occupied the land from the Adelaide plains and southwards down the western side of the Fleurieu Peninsula. There was a camp at Aldinga known as Camp Coortandillah, and Kaurna people were present living in the Aldinga Scrub until the 1870s, when Bishop Augustus Short sent the remaining people to the mission at Poonindie, thus ending their occupation of the area. After they were removed, some Aboriginal people from the Goolwa area (Ngarrindjeri people) occupied the area. The Kaurna language name of Aldinga was Ngaltingga.

=== European history ===
After British colonisation of South Australia, Aldinga started as a town in the 1850s in response to the development of farming on the Aldinga Plains. The layout of the town in circa 1857 is attributed to Lewis Fidge, a local farmer. The town is reported as growing quickly with the construction of a "hotel, church, blacksmith's shop and a number of other shops and trades". In the 1870s, the combination of declining productivity of the land and opportunities such as the availability of land in South Australia's mid-North resulted in a population decline. However, the town survived due to its location on the Old Coach Road which continues south to towns along the east coast of Gulf St Vincent as part of what is now called the Main South Road. Aldinga Post Office opened around 1851 and closed in 1992.

== Popular culture ==
The Catholic Church in Aldinga is dedicated to Mary of Galilee.

The bands Another's Life, The Fall of Troy, I Killed The Prom Queen, and Spirit of Alondray come from Aldinga.

== See also ==
- Aldinga Airfield
