= Wattle Flat, South Australia =

Wattle Flat South Australia
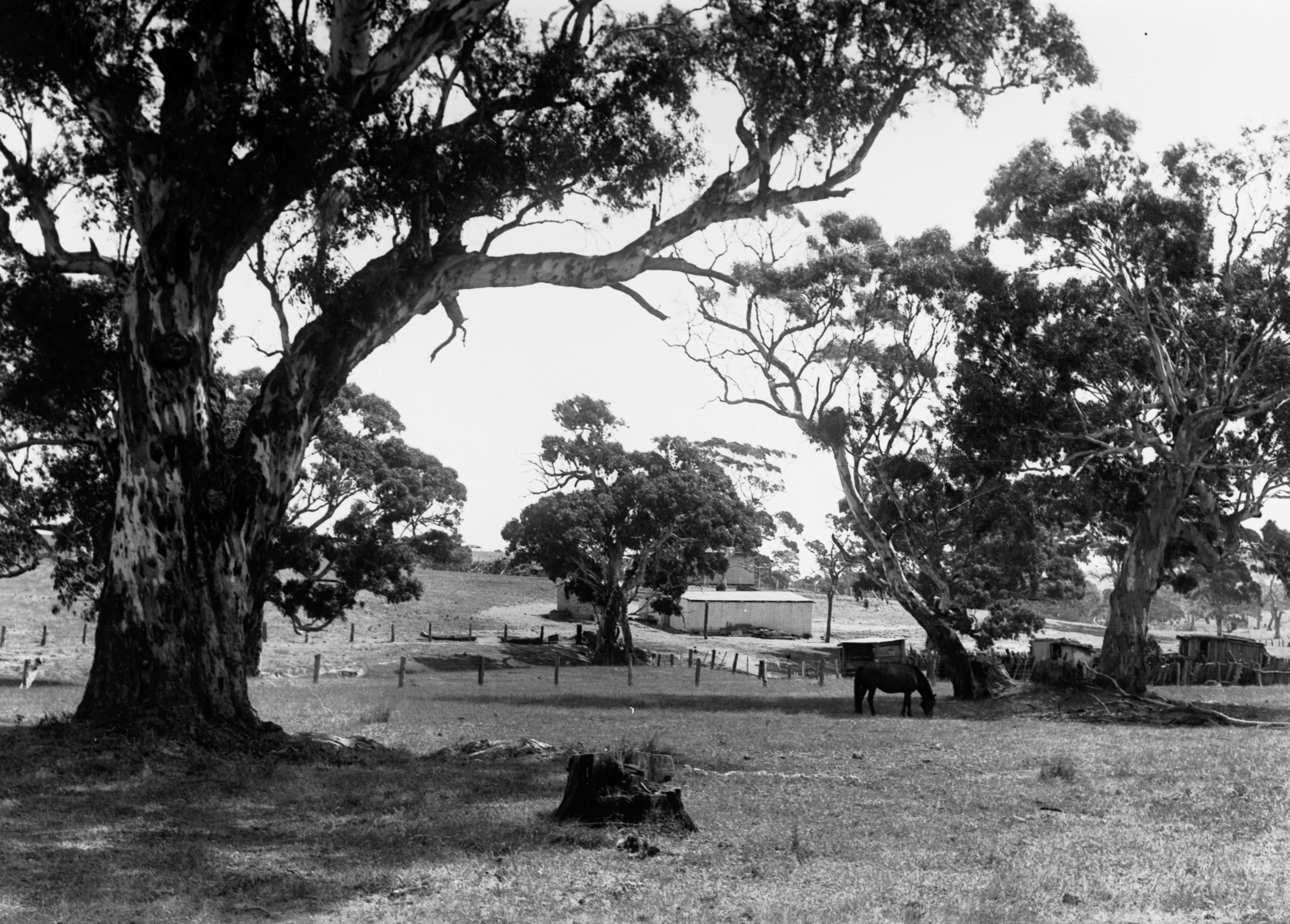
- Dairy and Pig Farm near Wattle Flat, c. 1930

- Coordinates: 35°25′46″S 138°23′18″E
- Population: 164 (2016 census)
- Time zone: ACST (UTC+9:30)
  - Summer (DST): ACST (UTC+10:30)
- LGA(s): District Council of Yankalilla
- Region: Fleurieu and Kangaroo Island
- County: Hindmarsh
- State electorate(s): Mawson
- Federal division(s): Mayo
Mean max temp	Mean min temp	Annual rainfall
19.4 °C; 67 °F	7.5 °C; 46 °F	756.3 mm 29.8 in
Suburbs around Wattle Flat:
Myponga Beach	Myponga Beach; Myponga	Myponga
Carrickalinga	Wattle Flat	Myponga
Yankalilla	Yankalilla; Inman Valley	Myponga; Inman Valley
- Footnotes: Adjoining localities

Wattle Flat is a locality in the Australian state of South Australia located on the Fleurieu Peninsula. At the 2016 census, Wattle Flat had a population of 164.
