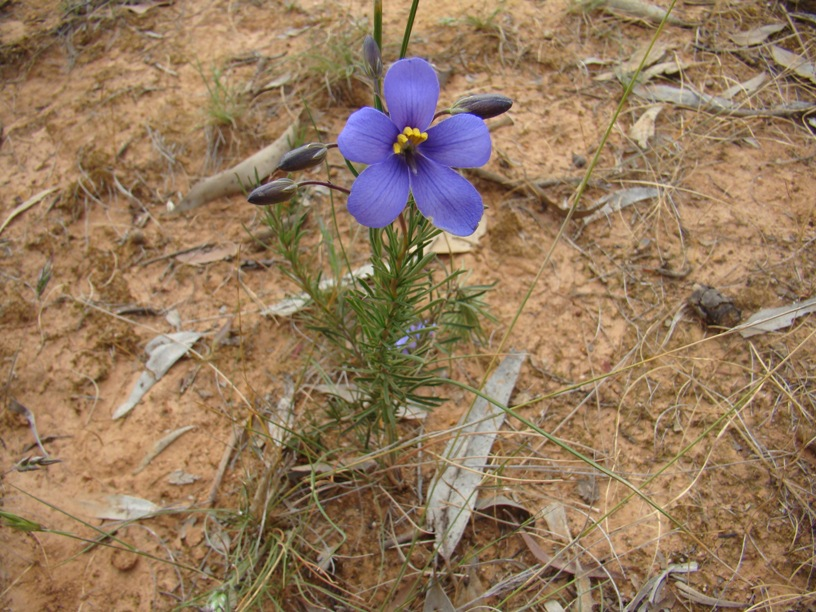
- Cheiranthera linearis

Scientific classification
- Kingdom: Plantae
- Clade: Embryophytes
- Clade: Tracheophytes
- Clade: Spermatophytes
- Clade: Angiosperms
- Clade: Eudicots
- Clade: Asterids
- Order: Apiales
- Family: Pittosporaceae
- Genus: Cheiranthera
- Species: C. linearis

Binomial name
- Cheiranthera linearis A.Cunn. ex Lindl.

= Cheiranthera linearis =

Finger-flower

Species of flowering plant

Cheiranthera linearis, commonly known as finger-flower, is a flowering plant in the family Pittosporaceae. It is a small shrub with deep purple flowers, yellow stamens and dull green linear shaped leaves. It is found growing in New South Wales, Victoria and Queensland.

== Description ==
Cheiranthera linearis is a small upright shrub to 50 cm (20 in) with smooth stems. The leaves are sessile, arranged alternately, more or less clustered on the stem, leaf blade mostly linear, 2–5 cm (0.79–1.97 in) long, 2–4 cm (0.79–1.57 in) wide, edges curved under, smooth, toothed or with lobes about 3 mm (0.12 in) long. The flowers may be single or in clusters of 2–5 on a short upright stems and 5 yellow stamens. The flower petals are egg-shaped, 15–20 mm (0.59–0.79 in) long and a blue to deep purple. The fruit capsules are more or less oblong to egg-shaped, 12–18 mm (0.47–0.71 in) long and flattened. Flowering occurs in summer and autumn.

== Taxonomy and naming ==
Cheiranthera linearis was first formally described in 1834 by John Lindley and the description was published in Edwards's Botanical Register. The specific epithet is taken from the Latin word linearis meaning "linear", which refers to the shape of the leaves.

== Distribution and habitat ==
Finger-flower is a widespread species found growing in woodland and forests on rocky or sandy locations in Queensland, New South Wales and Victoria.
