= Nixon-Skinner Conservation Park =

Protected area in South Australia

- IUCN category III (natural monument or feature)
- Location within South Australia
- Location: South Australia, Myponga
- Nearest city: Myponga
- Coordinates: 35°24′41″S 138°26′00″E
- Area: 8 ha (20 acres)
- Established: 1 January 1956
- Governing body: Department for Environment and Water

Nixon-Skinner Conservation Park (formerly the Nixon-Skinner National Park Reserve) is a protected area located in the Australian state of South Australia in the locality of Myponga about 55 kilometres (34 mi) south of the state capital of Adelaide and about 3.5 kilometres (2.2 mi) south-west of the town of Myponga.

The conservation park consists of land in section 245 in the cadastral unit of the Hundred of Myponga and which is bounded in the south by the Main South Road and to the east by the Myponga Reservoir.

The conservation park began in 1948 as a gift of “20 acres of scrub land at Myponga for use as a natural history reserve” by Lucy Page to the Field Naturalists Section of the Royal Society of South Australia and was named as the Nixon Skinner sanctuary in memory of her two grandfathers. On 1 January 1956, ownership of land was transferred to the Government of South Australia. On 9 November 1967, it was proclaimed under the National Parks Act 1966 as the Nixon-Skinner National Parks Reserve. On 27 April 1972, it was reconstituted as the Nixon-Skinner Conservation Park upon the proclamation of the National Parks and Wildlife Act 1972. On 24 February 1980, a plaque was unveiled by David Wotton, the then Environment Minister for South Australia, in the presence of Page's three surviving daughters to commemorate the donation of the land. As of 2016, it covered an area of 8 hectares (20 acres).

In 1980, it was described as follows:

…Nixon-Skinner Conservation Park supports a stringybark open forest (Eucalyptus obliqua) in the north and central parts and a woodland of E. leucoxylon in the south. E. fasciculosa is a smaller tree scattered through the Park. A mid-dense under-storey includes a variety of sclerophyllous shrubs. Introduced grasses and some pest plants (eg Watsonia sp.) have become established in the south-western corner of the Park. Schoenus tenuissimus which is a rare plant in South Australia … occupies damp sites in the park, which is visited by the spectacular Calyptorhynchus funereus (yellow-tailed black cockatoo).

The conservation park is classified as an IUCN Category III protected area. In 1980, it was listed on the now-defunct Register of the National Estate.

== See also ==
- Protected areas of South Australia
