= Carrickalinga =

Carrickalinga South Australia
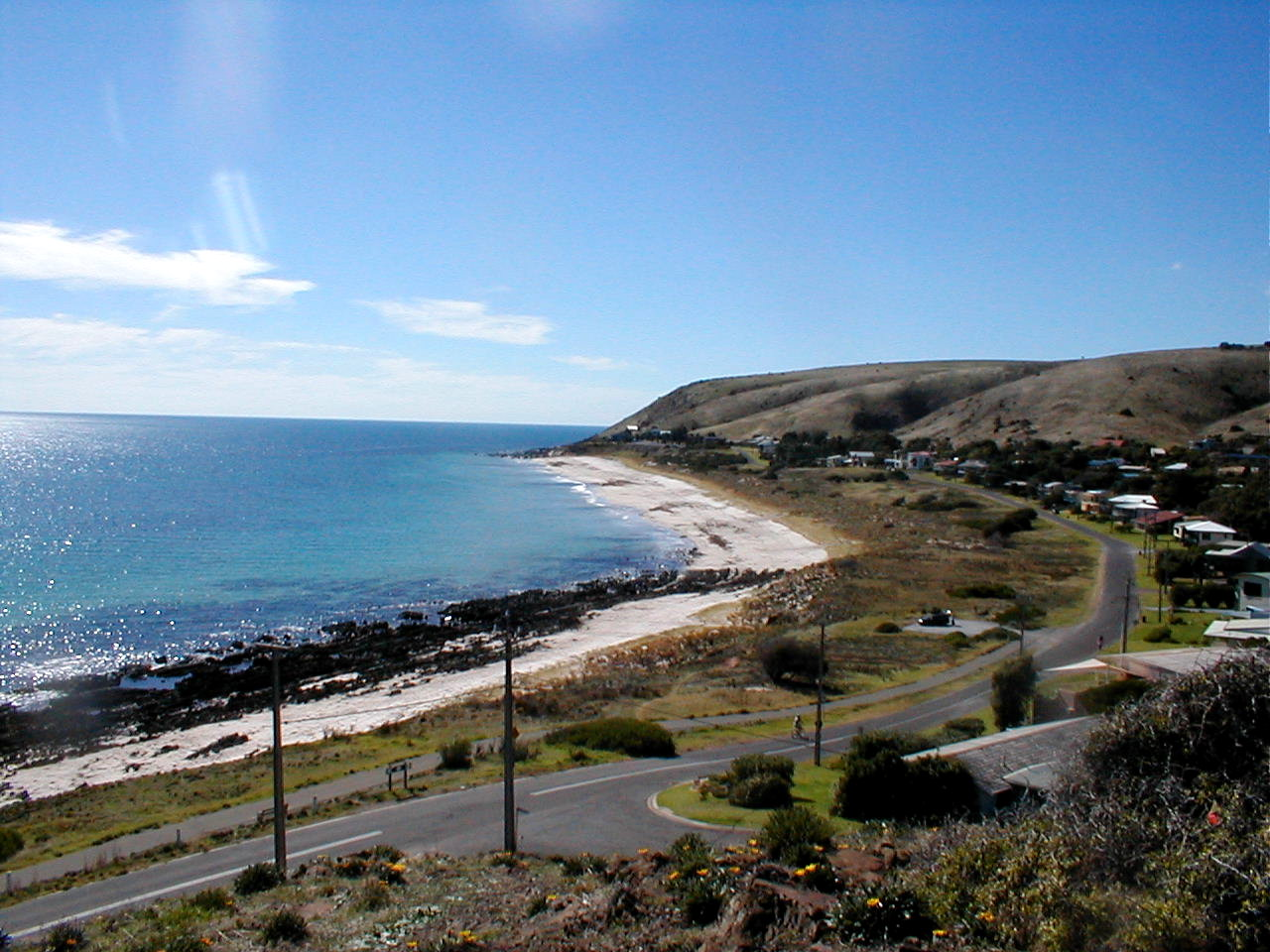
- North Carrickalinga Beach

- Coordinates: 35°26′0″S 138°19′0″E
- Population: 364 (2016 census)
- Established: 1958
- Postcode(s): 5204
- Location: 61 km (38 mi) South of Adelaide
- LGA(s): District Council of Yankalilla
- Region: Fleurieu and Kangaroo Island
- State electorate(s): Mawson
- Federal division(s): Mayo
Suburbs around Carrickalinga:
Gulf St Vincent	Myponga Beach	Myponga Beach
Gulf St Vincent	Carrickalinga	Wattle Flat
Normanville	Normanville; Yankalilla	Wattle Flat
- Footnotes: Location; Adjoining localities

Carrickalinga (from Kaurna Karrakardlangga / Karragarlangga) is a small coastal town in South Australia about 60 kilometres (37 mi) south of Adelaide on the Fleurieu Peninsula overlooking Gulf St Vincent. The town has no shops, with the nearest being in Normanville, one kilometre away. Haycock Point separates two beaches, sometimes referred to as North Carrickalinga and South Carrickalinga beaches, both on Yankalilla Bay. Carrickalinga Creek discharges into the sea south of the town.

== History ==
=== Aboriginal use ===
Before British colonisation of South Australia, the Kaurna people occupied the land from the Adelaide plains and southwards down western side of the Fleurieu Peninsula. The Kaurna name was Karrakardlangga. According to Geoff Manning, the name is "a corruption of the name of a former Aboriginal camp on section 1018 meaning 'place for redgum firewood'".

The Tjilbruke Dreaming Track, based on the story of the Kaurna creator ancestor Tjilbruke's journey down the Fleurieu Peninsula, follows the coastline through Carrickalinga. There is a commemorative plaque on Gold Coast Drive on the foreshore.

=== European settlement ===
Information on a silver/lead mine in the area was reported in newspapers in 1862 and 1880, and a 1913 article refers to "mineral wealth".

Carrickalinga first appeared in 1958 as the name of a private subdivision developed by a George Lewis of Waterloo Corner in the cadastral unit of the Hundred of Myponga. The name was "used in preference to Gold Coast".

Boundaries were established in respect to the Geographical Names Act 1988, with a portion being added in 1994 and then "redefined" in 1999. George Lewis is remembered in the naming of Lewis Road, whilst a former Town Clerk of the District Council of Yankalilla, Tom Lyddon, has Lyddon Place named after him. The original sales agent, Cliff Hawkins, placed a flagpole on the hill adjoining Solitude Drive, which remains in place today.

== Governance ==
Carrickalinga is located within the federal division of Mayo, the state electoral district of Mawson and the local government area of the District Council of Yankalilla.

== Description ==
The beaches are wide with white sand that stretches down to the pristine water. Haycock Point separates two beaches, with the beach north of the point and running up to Carrickalinga Head described as Carrickalinga Beach by Beachsafe. There was a jetty constructed there in April 1923, later demolished owing to its poor siting, being exposed to wind and constant sea swell.

Carrickalinga Creek, also spelt Carricalinga Creek, discharges into the sea just south of Riverview Drive, although beach sand often covers the river mouth.
