= Myponga Beach, South Australia =

Coastal locality in South Australia

Myponga Beach South Australia
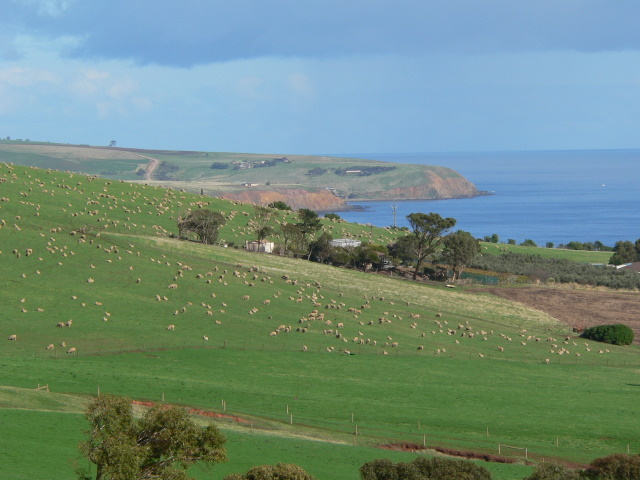
- Sheep grazing on the slopes of Black Hill near Myponga Beach

- Coordinates: 35.374°S 138.387°E
- Population: 33 (2016 census)
- Established: 5 August 1999
- Postcode(s): 5202
- Time zone: ACST (UTC+9:30)
  - Summer (DST): ACST (UTC+10:30)
- Location: 54 km (34 mi) S of Adelaide
- LGA(s): District Council of Yankalilla
- Region: Fleurieu and Kangaroo Island
- State electorate(s): Mawson
- Federal division(s): Mayo
Mean max temp	Mean min temp	Annual rainfall
19.4 °C; 67 °F	7.5 °C; 46 °F	751.3 mm 29.6 in
Suburbs around Myponga Beach:
Gulf St Vincent	Gulf St Vincent	Sellicks Hill
Gulf St Vincent	Myponga Beach	Myponga
Gulf St Vincent	Carrickalinga; Wattle Flat	Wattle Flat
- Footnotes: Location; Adjoining localities

Myponga Beach is a locality in the Australian state of South Australia about 54 kilometres (34 miles) south of the state capital of Adelaide. It is on the eastern shore of Gulf St Vincent, immediately north of the northern boundary of the Fleurieu Peninsula.

The locality extends from Snapper Point (Note: 35.2708°S 138.4444°E) (at the southern end of Aldinga Bay) in the north to Carrickalinga Point (Note: 35.4099°S 138.3286°E) about 18.7 km (11.6 mi) to the south-west. The coastline includes an inlet known as Coweelunga Bay; on its shores are a popular beach (known colloquially as Myponga Beach) (Note: 35.3724°S 138.3866°E) and the mouth of the Myponga River.

Myponga Beach began as a shack site on the shoreline in section 240 of the cadastral unit of the Hundred of Myponga. Boundaries were created for this "long established name" in 1999.

As of 2015, land use within the locality consisted of land zoned for primary production uses such as agriculture, land adjoining the coastline being zoned for conservation purposes and the settlement at Coweelunga Bay being zoned as a "country township".

The 2016 Australian census reported that the locality had a population of 33 people.

Myponga Beach is located within the federal division of Mayo, the state electoral district of Mawson and the local government area of the District Council of Yankalilla.
