= Aldinga Beach, South Australia =

Aldinga Beach
- Suburb
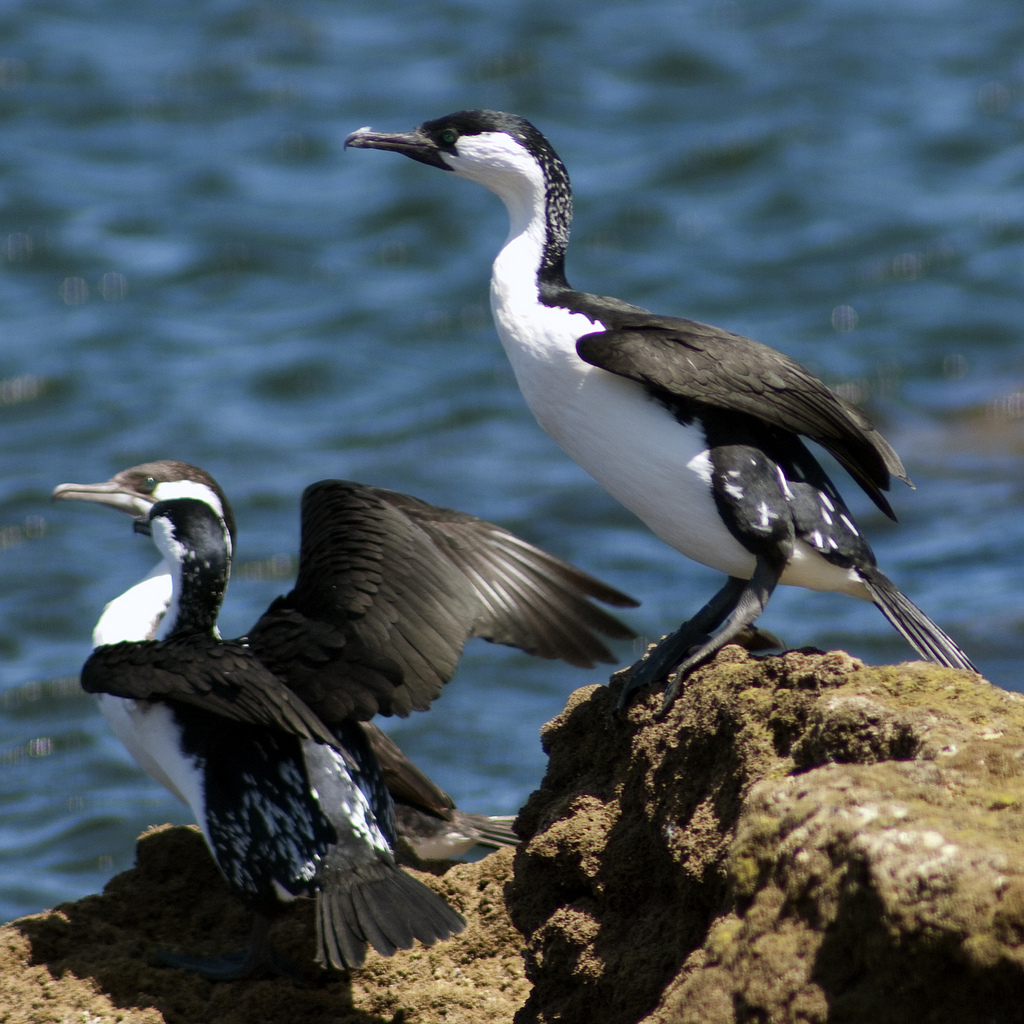
- Black cormorants at Aldinga Beach

- Coordinates: 35°17′42″S 138°27′27″E
- Country: Australia
- State: South Australia
- Region: Southern Adelaide
- LGA: City of Onkaparinga
- Location: 41 km (25 mi) S of Adelaide

Government
  - State electorate: Mawson
  - Federal division: Mayo

Population
  - Total: 10,667 (SAL 2021)
- Time zone: UTC+9:30 (ACST)
  - Summer (DST): UTC+10:30 (ACDT)
- Postcode: 5173
- County: Adelaide
- Mean max temp: 21.8 °C (71.2 °F)
- Mean min temp: 12.8 °C (55.0 °F)
- Annual rainfall: 442.1 mm (17.41 in)
Suburbs around Aldinga Beach
Gulf St Vincent	Port Willunga	Aldinga
Gulf St Vincent	Aldinga Beach	Aldinga; Sellicks Hill
Gulf St Vincent	Sellicks Beach	Sellicks Hill

Aldinga Beach is an outer southern suburb of Adelaide, South Australia. It lies within the City of Onkaparinga and has the postcode 5173. At the 2021 census, Aldinga Beach had a population of 10,667. It lies about a kilometre west of the smaller suburb of Aldinga. The beach is a well-known spot for surfing, swimming, scuba diving, and snorkelling during the summer months. It overlooks an aquatic reserve which has been created to safeguard a unique reef formation.

The Silver Sands beach and holiday area lies just south of Aldinga Beach.

== History ==
=== Aboriginal use ===
Before British colonisation of South Australia, the Kaurna people occupied the land from the Adelaide plains and southwards down western side of the Fleurieu Peninsula. There was a camp at Aldinga known as Camp Coortandillah, and Kaurna people were present living in the Aldinga Scrub until the 1870s, when Bishop Augustus Short sent the remaining people to the mission at Poonindie, thus ending their occupation of the area. After they were removed, some Aboriginal people from the Goolwa area (Ngarrindjeri people) occupied the area. The Kaurna language name of Aldinga was Ngaltingga.

=== European settlement ===
Aldinga Beach Post Office opened on 1 March 1960.

Aldinga Beach has four places listed on the South Australian Heritage Register. The former farmhouses at 5 Barramundi Way and 3726 Main South Road, Symond's Barn at 7 Stewart Avenue and 4-8 Sunset Parade are all listed on the register.

== Protected areas ==
Aldinga Beach is associated with two protected areas - the Aldinga Scrub Conservation Park and the Aldinga Reef Aquatic Reserve. The Aldinga Scrub Conservation Park is located within the southern extent of the suburb and on land in the adjoining suburb of Sellicks Beach. The Aldinga Reef aquatic reserve is located immediately offshore of both Aldinga Beach and Port Willunga and includes land within the intertidal zone of both suburbs.

=== Aldinga Washpool ===
Aldinga Washpool and Blue Lagoon are situated just to the south of the conservation park, with the Washpool area covering almost 75 hectares (190 acres). The Blue Lagoon is a smaller lagoon, situated at the north-eastern end. The Washpool is one of few remaining coastal estuarine lagoon systems and wetlands on the coast of greater Adelaide, and provides important habitat for waterbirds (such as the hooded plover) and other flora and fauna. The wetland fills up as the winter rains come, and can dry out from about October to May each year. It is a popular area for birding, and a breeding ground for the endangered yellowish sedge skipper butterfly.

The Washpool area is also a place of great significance for the traditional owners, the Kaurna people, as it is the location of a Tjirbruke (the creator ancestor) freshwater spring, and part of the Dreaming Track dedicated in 1986. The Kaurna name was Wakondilla or Wangkondilla. The second version of the name (incorporating "wang") relates to a small possum, but it is not known which version is correct. The area was used for curing and drying animal skins, and there were freshwater springs nearby, around which were Kaurna campsites. Hunting would take place in the Aldinga Scrub, and fishing along Sellicks Beach.

Volunteers have been working on rewilding the area for many years, and they have been lobbying the state government to give the area protection. Among other measures, the volunteers have been planting gahnia seedlings, upon which the yellowish sedge skipper butterfly lives. The area has been the site of community activism since 1971, when the government announced that it intended to include the Blue Lagoon and Washpool in an extended the Aldinga Reserve (now Aldinga Scrub Conservation Park).

== See also ==
- History of Adelaide
- European settlement of South Australia
- Aldinga Bay
