= Myponga Dam =

Dam and reservoir in South Australia

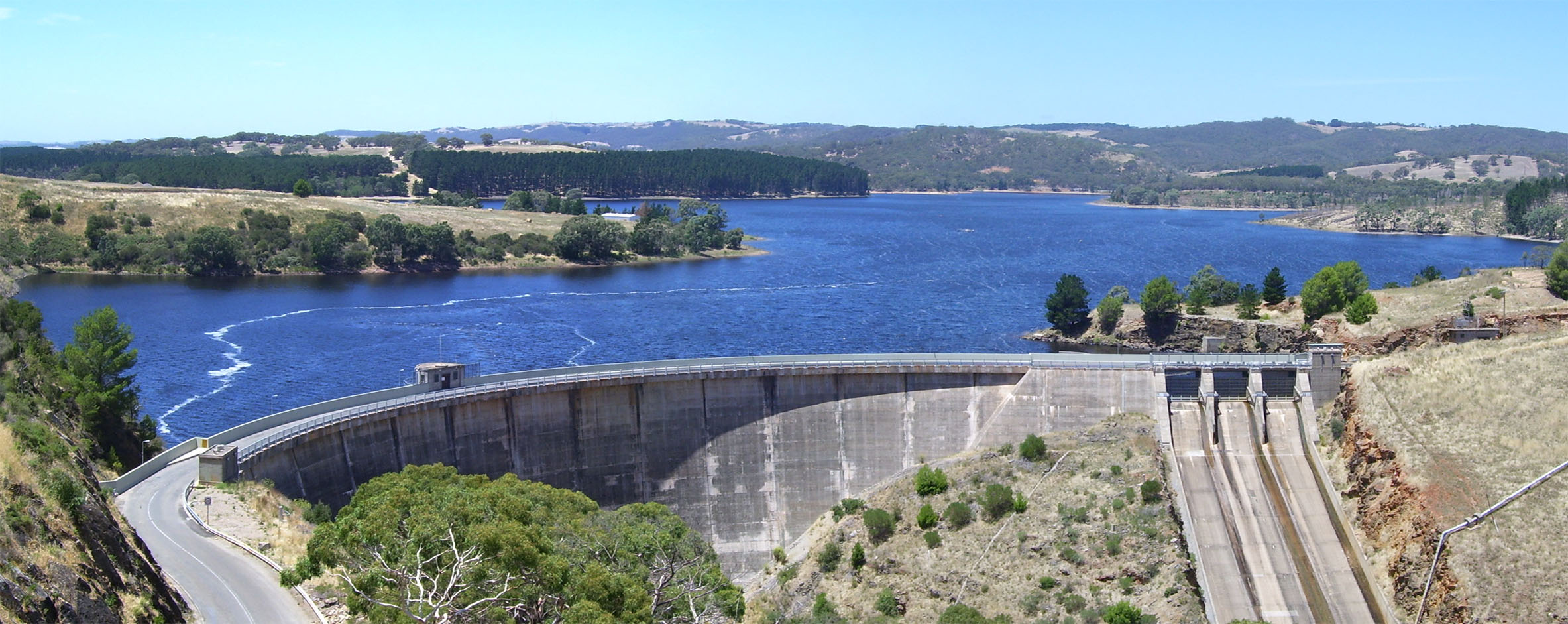
- The dam wall and reservoir, in 2010, viewed from the lookout

- Location of the dam in South Australia
- Interactive map of Myponga Dam
- Country: Australia
- Location: Myponga, Fleurieu Peninsula, South Australia
- Coordinates: 35°24′01″S 138°25′13″E
- Purpose: Water supply
- Status: Operational
- Construction began: 1958
- Opening date: 1962
- Built by: Hansen, Wilkens & Hornibrook Construction
- Owner: Government of South Australia
- Operator: SA Water

Dam and spillways
- Type of dam: Arch dam
- Impounds: Myponga River
- Height (foundation): 49 m (161 ft)
- Length: 226 m (741 ft)
- Dam volume: 54×10^{3} m^{3} (1.9×10^{6} cu ft)
- Spillway type: Controlled
- Spillway capacity: 1,400 m^{3}/s (49,000 cu ft/s)

Reservoir
- Creates: Myponga Reservoir
- Total capacity: 27.13 GL (21,990 acre⋅ft)
- Active capacity: 26.8 GL (21,700 acre⋅ft)
- Catchment area: 124 km^{2} (48 sq mi)
- Surface area: 280 ha (690 acres)
- Normal elevation: 205 m (673 ft) AHD

The Myponga Dam is an arch dam across the Myponga River, located near the eponymous town, on the Fleurieu Peninsula of South Australia. Completed in 1962, the resultant reservoir, the Myponga Reservoir, was established to supplement the supply of potable water to Adelaide, located approximately 60 kilometres (37 mi) to the north.

== Overview ==
The concrete dam wall is 49 metres (161 ft) high and 226 metres (741 ft) long. When full, the reservoir has capacity of 27.13 gigalitres (21,990 acre⋅ft) and covers 280 hectares (690 acres), drawn from a catchment area of 124 square kilometres (48 sq mi). The controlled spillway has a flow capacity of 1,400 cubic metres per second (49,000 cu ft/s). In addition to supplying approximately 5 percent of Adelaide's water supply, the reservoir is the main source of filtered water for southern metropolitan Adelaide and the southern coast area.

Plans to use the Myponga River catchment as a major storage area were made in 1945. Construction began in 1958 and was completed in 1962, flooding what was from 1840 known as "Lovely Valley". Prior to the construction of the Myponga Water Treatment Plant in 1993, water from the Myponga Reservoir was used to supplement the Happy Valley Reservoir.

== Search for missing children ==
The reservoir was searched for the bodies of the Beaumont children, and Joanne Ratcliffe and Kirste Gordon in early 1990, based on evidence against Bevan Spencer von Einem delivered by "Mr. B", a witness. No remains were found there.

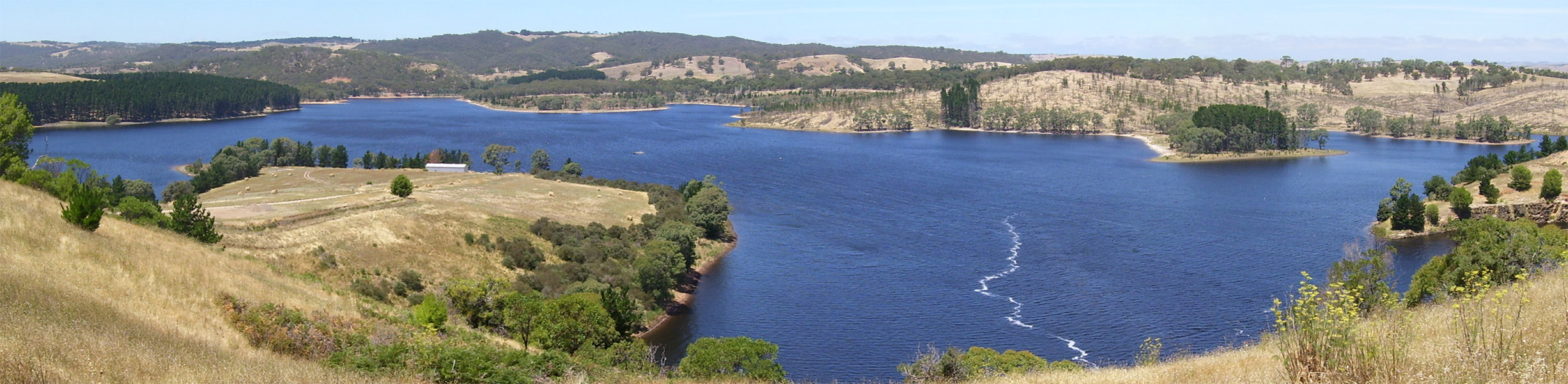
Myponga Reservoir seen from Reservoir Road

== See also ==
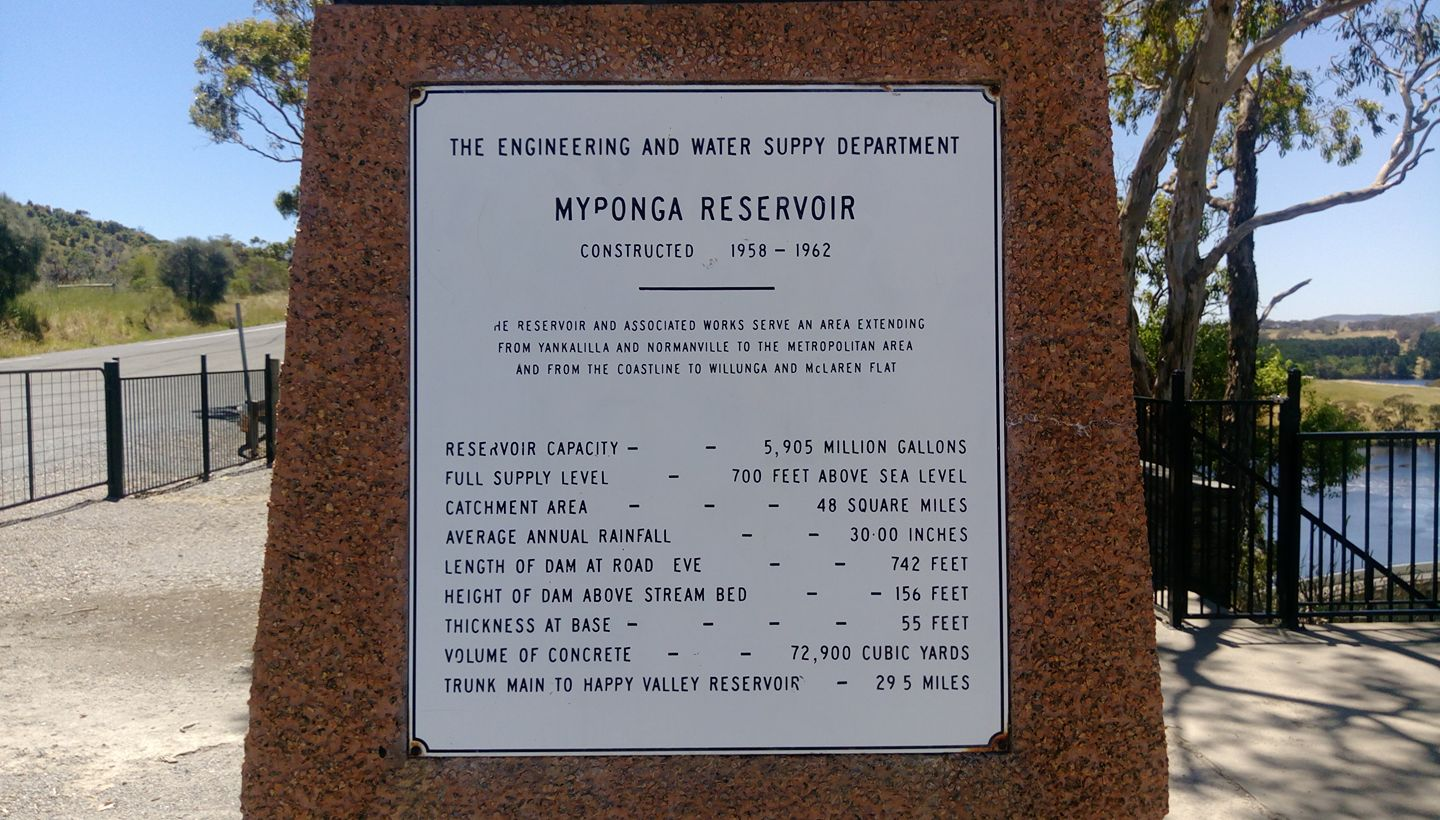
Myponga Reservoir information

- List of reservoirs and dams in South Australia
- Nixon-Skinner Conservation Park
