= Aldinga Airfield =

Airfield in Aldinga, Australia

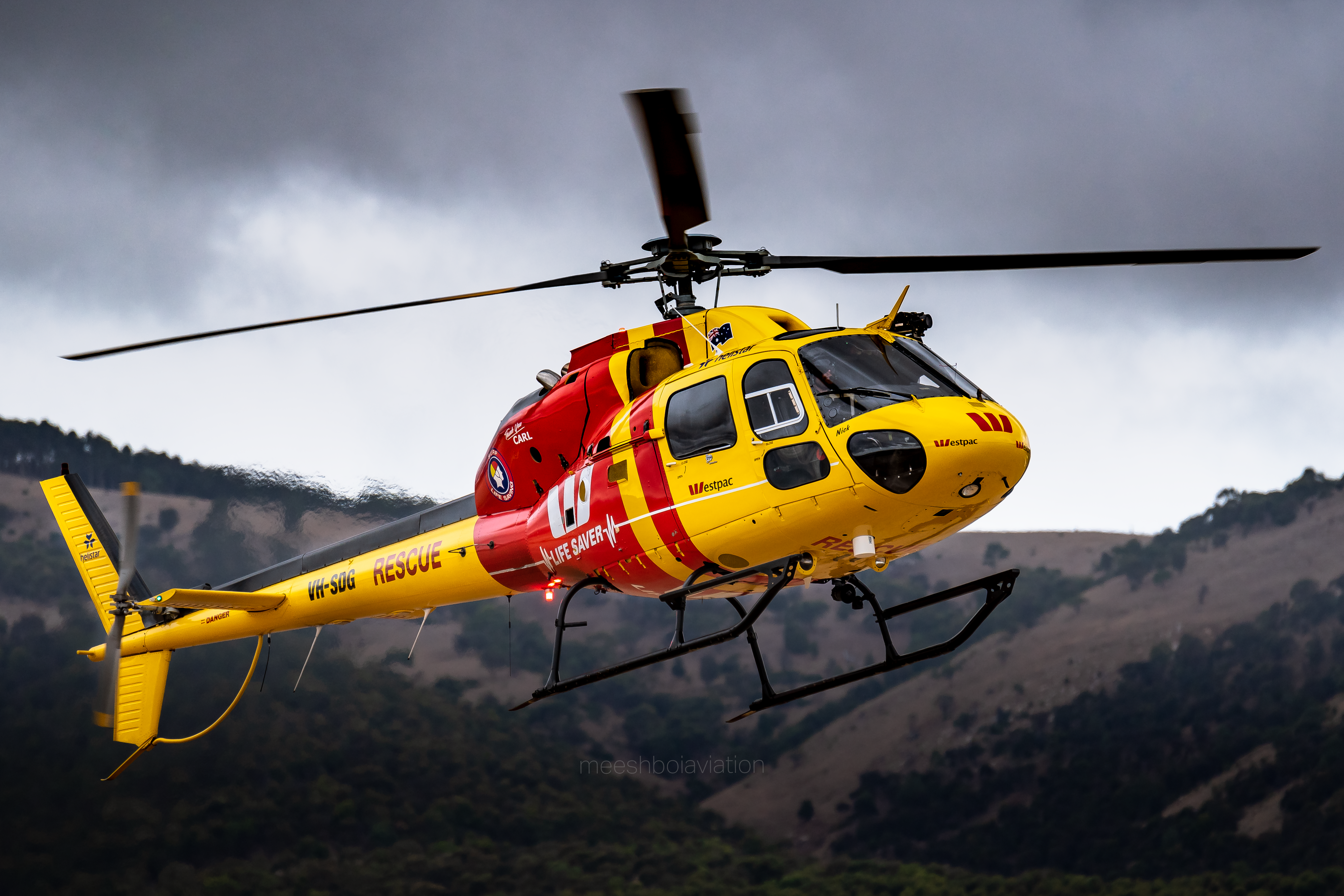
- Westpac Life Saver Rescue Helicopter Service helicopter departing Aldinga Airfield back to Adelaide Airport
- IATA: none; ICAO: YADG

Summary
- Airport type: Public
- Operator: Privately Owned
- Location: Aldinga, South Australia
- Focus city for: Adelaide
- Elevation AMSL: 108 ft (33 m)
- Coordinates: 35°17′19″S 138°29′39″E
- Website: http://www.aldingaaviation.com.au/

Map
- Location in South Australia

Runways
Direction	Length		Surface
Direction	ft	m	Surface
03/21	2,992	912	Asphalt
14/32	2,755	840	Bitumen

Aldinga Airfield (ICAO:YADG) is a small, uncontrolled regional airfield located in Aldinga, South Australia. The airfield serves as a regional port and is privately owned and maintained.

== History ==
Aldinga Airfield was built in 1976 by a group of pilots who wanted an authentic airfield that could access the McLaren Vale wine region. The airfield received significant support from other pilots and aviators and was eventually built with a paved runway, and constructed parking areas. Today the airfield is used mostly by private pilots, and is a base for 2 flight schools; Adelaide Biplanes and Lite Air and is used from time to time as well by Adelaide Aviation. The airfield mostly attracts pilots who are passing through from Kangaroo Island, Eyre Peninsula and other places. The airfield is outside the main Adelaide controlled airspace, making it easy for VFR pilots to operate in and out of the airfield. The airfield has over 50 parking hangars, most of which are privately owned. The perimeter of the airfield is housed with a hip-level fence, which gives an unblocked view of aircraft landing on the runways. However, especially on approach for runway 32, there are large trees and heavy shrubs close to the runway threshold, which can be tricky and dangerous for pilots who are landing or departing from that runway.

== Facilities ==
The airfield has four runways.

Runway 03/21 is the longest runway, with a total length of 912 metres (2,992 ft). It is the only paved and marked runway at the aerodrome.

Runway 14/32 runs perpendicular to runway 03/21. It is a Bitumen strip with a total length of 840 metres (2,760 ft). It was sealed in late 2025 and converted from dirt to bitumen.

There are 2 other shorter grass runways, 08/26 and 18/36. Aldinga Airfield has a parking facility, which offers overnight parking. There is also a café that is open 7 days a week and an avgas pump.

== See also ==
- List of airports in South Australia
