= Port Willunga, South Australia =

Port Willunga
- Suburb
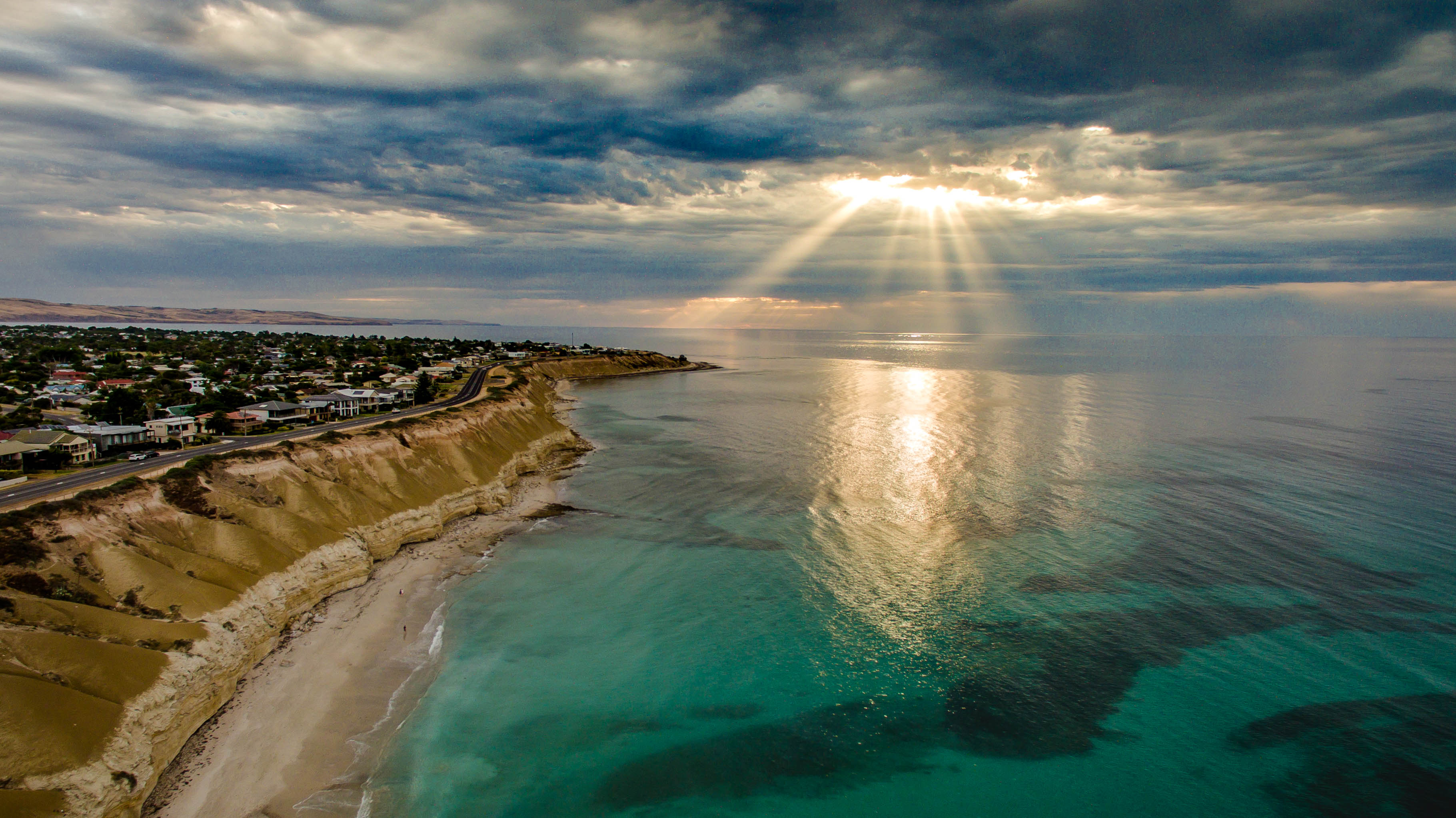
- Port Willunga beach

- Coordinates: 35°15′37″S 138°27′47″E
- Country: Australia
- State: South Australia
- Region: Southern Adelaide
- City: Adelaide
- LGA: City of Onkaparinga

Government
  - State electorate: Mawson
  - Federal division: Mayo

Population
  - Total: 1,785 (SAL 2021)
- Time zone: UTC+9:30 (ACST)
  - Summer (DST): UTC+10:30 (ACST)
- Postcode: 5173
- County: Adelaide
Suburbs around Port Willunga
Gulf St Vincent	Maslin Beach	Maslin Beach
Gulf St Vincent	Port Willunga	Aldinga
Gulf St Vincent; Aldinga Beach	Aldinga Beach	Aldinga

Port Willunga is a semi-rural suburb of Adelaide, South Australia. It is known as Wirruwarrungga or Ruwarunga by the traditional owners, the Kaurna people, and is of significance as being the site of a freshwater spring said to be created by the tears of Tjilbruke, the creator being.

The 2016 Australian census reported a population of 1,637 people.

Port Willunga is located within the federal division of Mayo, the state electoral district of Mawson and the local government area of the City of Onkaparinga.

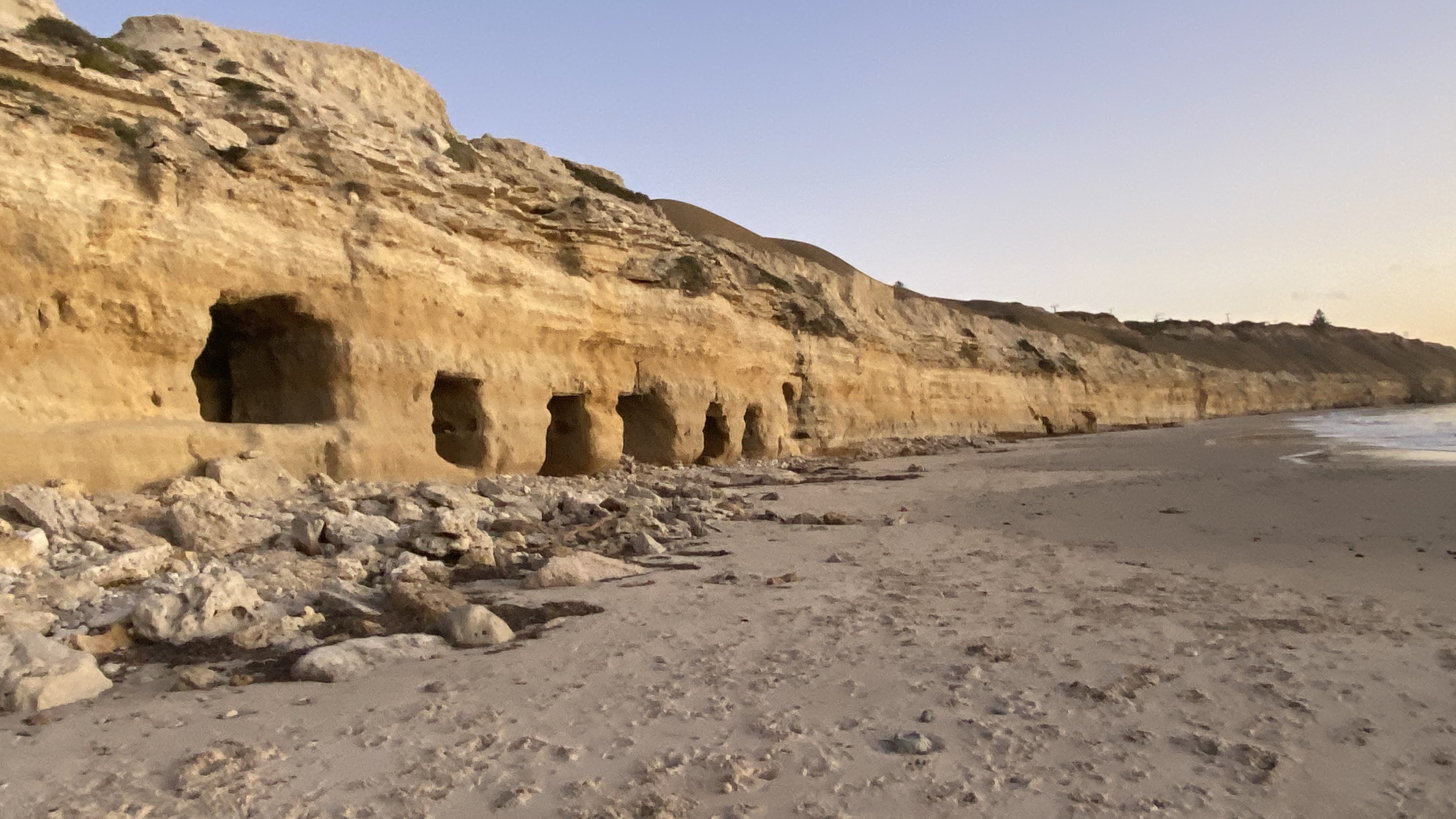
Port Willunga Beach, South Australia

Port Willunga beach is one of the most photographed beaches in South Australia and is a popular wedding location featuring the remains of the old Port Willunga Jetty with its golden cliff faces, crystal clear waters and soft white sands.

== History ==
Before the British colonisation of South Australia, the Port Willunga area, along with most of the Adelaide plains area and down the western side of the Fleurieu Peninsula, was inhabited by the Kaurna people. There is a significant site associated with the Kaurna Dreaming of the creator ancestor Tjilbruke, with a commemorative plaque at the Esplanade car park.

The name Port Willunga was first introduced in 1850. The first export cargo of wheat was loaded from this location in February 1850, with speculation that a wharf would be built there in the future. Mr C.T. Hewitt claimed to have been the first to raise the proposition of such a construction. Residents petitioned for a jetty to be constructed there in 1852 and government tenders were invited for its construction in March 1853. Difficulties raising money for the construction delayed its completion. The jetty was constructed in stages, and was functional in 1853 with further works committed to the following year. Tenders for the jetty extension were taken in August 1854. Early exports from Port Willunga included slate, flour, bran and hay.

Port Willunga was officially proclaimed a port of export in 1856 and again in 1861, then proclaimed a port of both import and export in 1865.

In 1871 the jetty was placed under the care and management of the Aldinga District Council. Jetty extensions of various cost and configuration were considered in December 1873.

By the early 20th century, commercial shipping at Port Willunga had ceased, but the jetty remained in place and was used by fishermen, residents and holiday-makers visiting the area.

The timber jetty received heavy storm damage on multiple occasions, including in 1896, 1906 and 1910. Fears for its future followed further storm damage in 1914. An assessment in 1915 deemed the jetty damaged beyond repair, and discussions of constructing a new jetty, purely for recreational use began. In 1928, locals were still petitioning government to build a replacement jetty.

=== Shipping incidents ===
The Cowry was grounded on reef south of Port Willunga on 31 December 1887.

The Star of Greece was wrecked off Port Willunga on 12 July 1888, and forms the subject of a book published a century later by Geoffrey Manning.

== See also ==
- Aldinga Reef Aquatic Reserve
