= Star of Greece =

British clipper ship built in 1868 and sunk in 1888

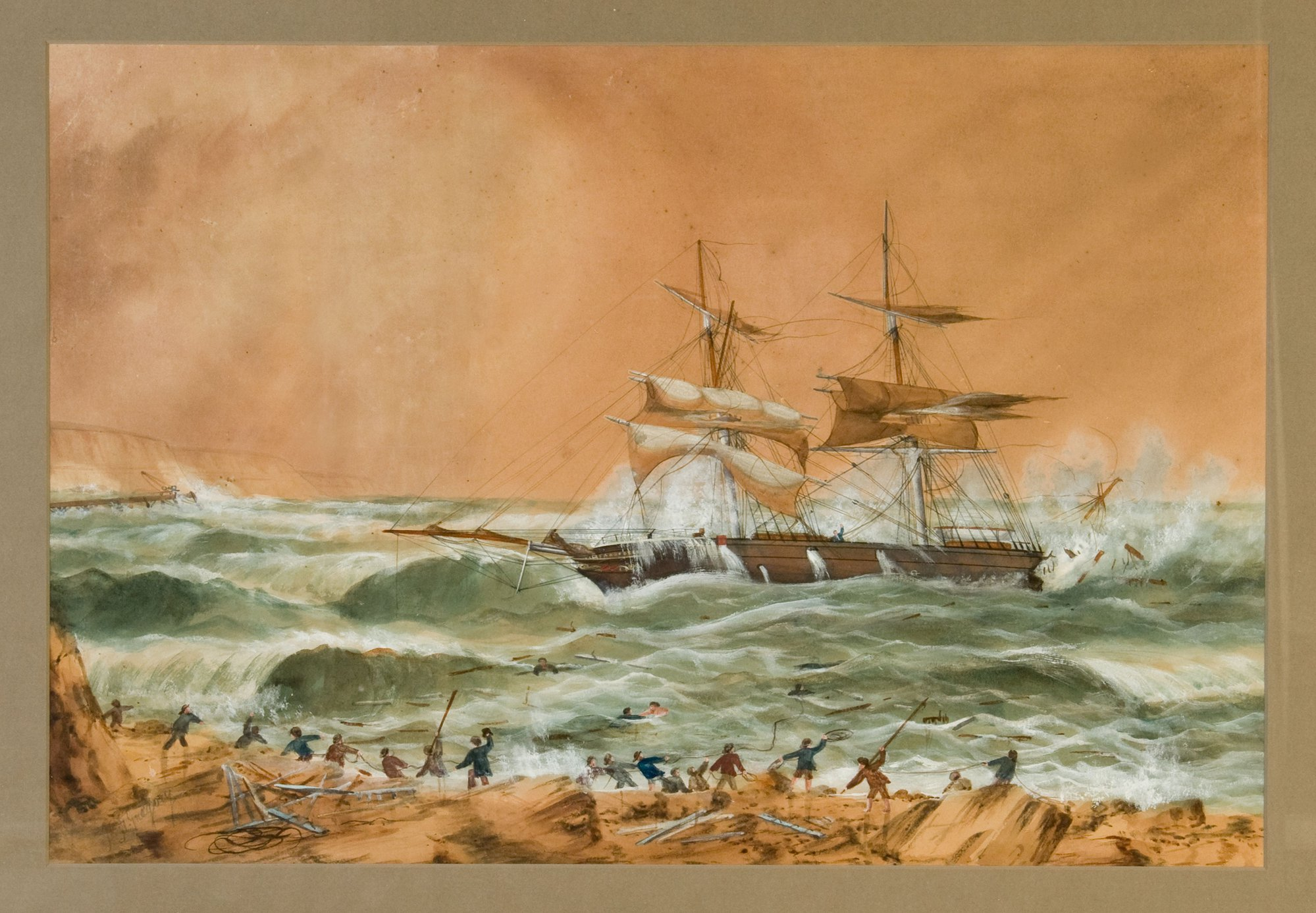
Painting of the wreck of the Star of Greece by GF Gregory

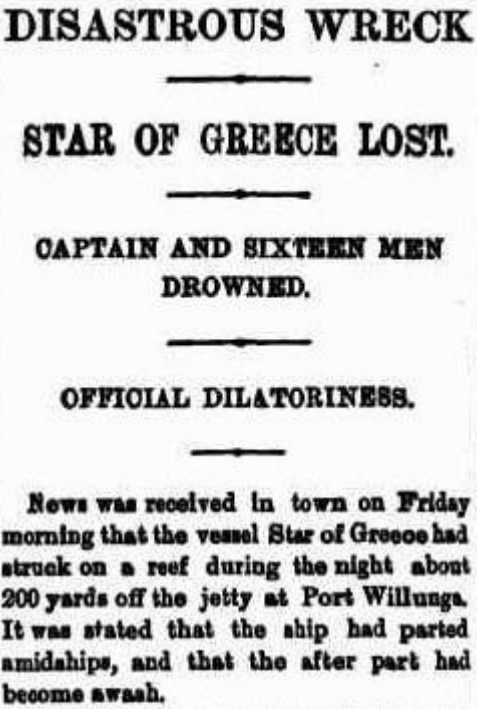
A newspaper article announcing the sinking of the Star of Greece published in the Adelaide Observer

The Star of Greece was a three-masted clipper that was built in 1868 by Harland and Wolff in Belfast for JP Corry & Co. It was wrecked on the coast of South Australia in 1888.

The ship initially sailed the profitable route between Calcutta, India, and Britain, carrying coal to India and commodities such as jute in the opposite direction. On one occasion, the Star of Greece suffered a fire in its cargo of coal. The ship's design featured three separate holds isolated by steel bulkheads, and the crew were able to contain the fire by pumping water into the hold. The ship safely made its way to Calcutta.

In the 1870s, the profitability of clipper trade with India declined due to competition from steam ships sailing through newly opened Suez Canal and the Mediterranean Ocean instead of rounding Cape Horn and the Cape of Good Hope. Thus, the Star of Greece's owners decided to serve the still profitable route to Australia. On this route, the Star of Greece would transport miscellaneous supplies to Australia and commodities such as wool and wheat back to Britain.

On 13 July 1888, the Star of Greece sank off Port Willunga in South Australia with the loss of 18 crew. Two inquiries blamed the Captain, Henry Russel Harrower, for the sinking.

Today, the Star of Greece has become a popular dive site for recreational divers. The ship's remains are easily accessible, lying in relatively shallow water close to shore.
