= Aldinga Reef Aquatic Reserve =

Protected area in South Australia

- IUCN category II (national park)
- Location within South Australia
- Location: South Australia
- Nearest city: Aldinga Beach.
- Coordinates: 35.2702°S 138.4350°E
- Area: 6.16 km^{2} (2.38 sq mi)
- Established: 1 December 1971
- Governing body: Primary Industries and Regions SA

Aldinga Reef Aquatic Reserve is a marine protected area in the Australian state of South Australia located in waters adjoining the east coast of Gulf St Vincent including land within the intertidal zone in the suburbs of Aldinga Beach and Port Willunga about 40 kilometres (25 mi) south of the state capital of Adelaide.

It was declared on 30 November 1971 to protect "aquatic plants and animals associated with the large intertidal limestone reef and the spectacular precipitous underwater cliff known as the 'drop-off' and the surrounding sandy substrate for the purposes of education and recreation". "Fishing and collecting or removing any marine organism is prohibited", however the following activities are permitted - use of boats, swimming, snorkelling, scuba diving and walking on intertidal reef exposed at low water. The reserve extends seaward a distance of about 2 kilometres (1.2 miles) around a headland named Snapper Point from Thomas Street, Aldinga Beach in the south and Seaborne Avenue, Port Willunga in the north.

Since 2012, it has been located within the boundaries of a "sanctuary zone" within the Encounter Marine Park.

The aquatic reserve is classified as an IUCN Category II protected area.

== See also ==
- Protected areas of South Australia
- List of protected areas in Adelaide
