= Aldinga Bay =

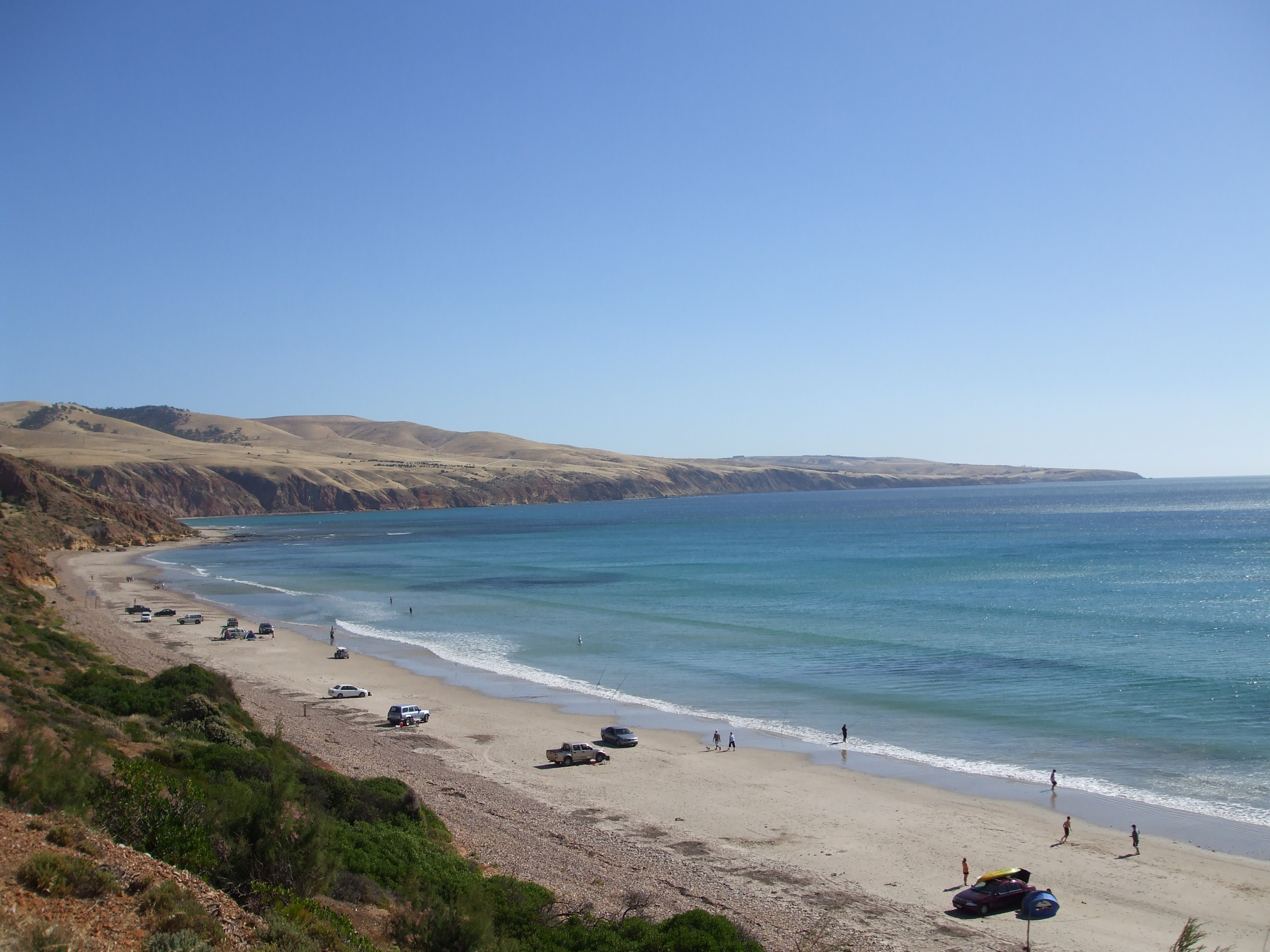
- Aldinga Bay looking south from Sellicks Beach

- Location in South Australia
- Location: South Australia
- Coordinates: 35°19′47″S 138°25′47″E
- Type: Bay
- Basin countries: Australia
- Max. length: about 13 km (8.1 mi)
- Max. width: about 4 km (2.5 mi)
- Max. depth: 16.4 m (54 ft)
- Settlements: Aldinga Beach; Sellicks Beach; Myponga Beach

Aldinga Bay is a bay located on the east coast of Gulf St Vincent in South Australia about 40 kilometres (25 miles) south-southwest of Adelaide city centre.

== Extent & description ==
Aldinga Bay lies between Snapper Point (Note: 35.2708°S 138.4444°E) in the suburb of Aldinga Beach at its northern extremity and the remains of Myponga Jetty (Note: 35.37182°S 138.38401°E) at Myponga Beach at its southern extremity.

== Ports and other settlements ==
The bay has no infrastructure for maritime use apart from access to the beach from the road network to launch and retrieve small boats at specific locations permitted by the local government authority, the City of Onkaparinga. The following settlements are located along its coastline from north to south: Aldinga Beach and Sellicks Beach in the City of Onkaparinga and Myponga Beach in the District Council of Yankalilla.

== Protected areas ==
The waters of Aldinga Bay are within the Encounter Marine Park. The south-eastern part of the Aldinga Reef aquatic reserve is within the bay.

== Citations and references ==
=== References ===
- South Australia. Department of Marine and Harbors (DMH) (1985), The Waters of South Australia a series of charts, sailing notes and coastal photographs, Dept. of Marine and Harbors, South Australia, ISBN 978-0-7243-7603-2
