= Aldinga Scrub Conservation Park =

Protected area in South Australia

Wangkuntila-Aldinga Conservation Park
- IUCN category III (natural monument or feature)
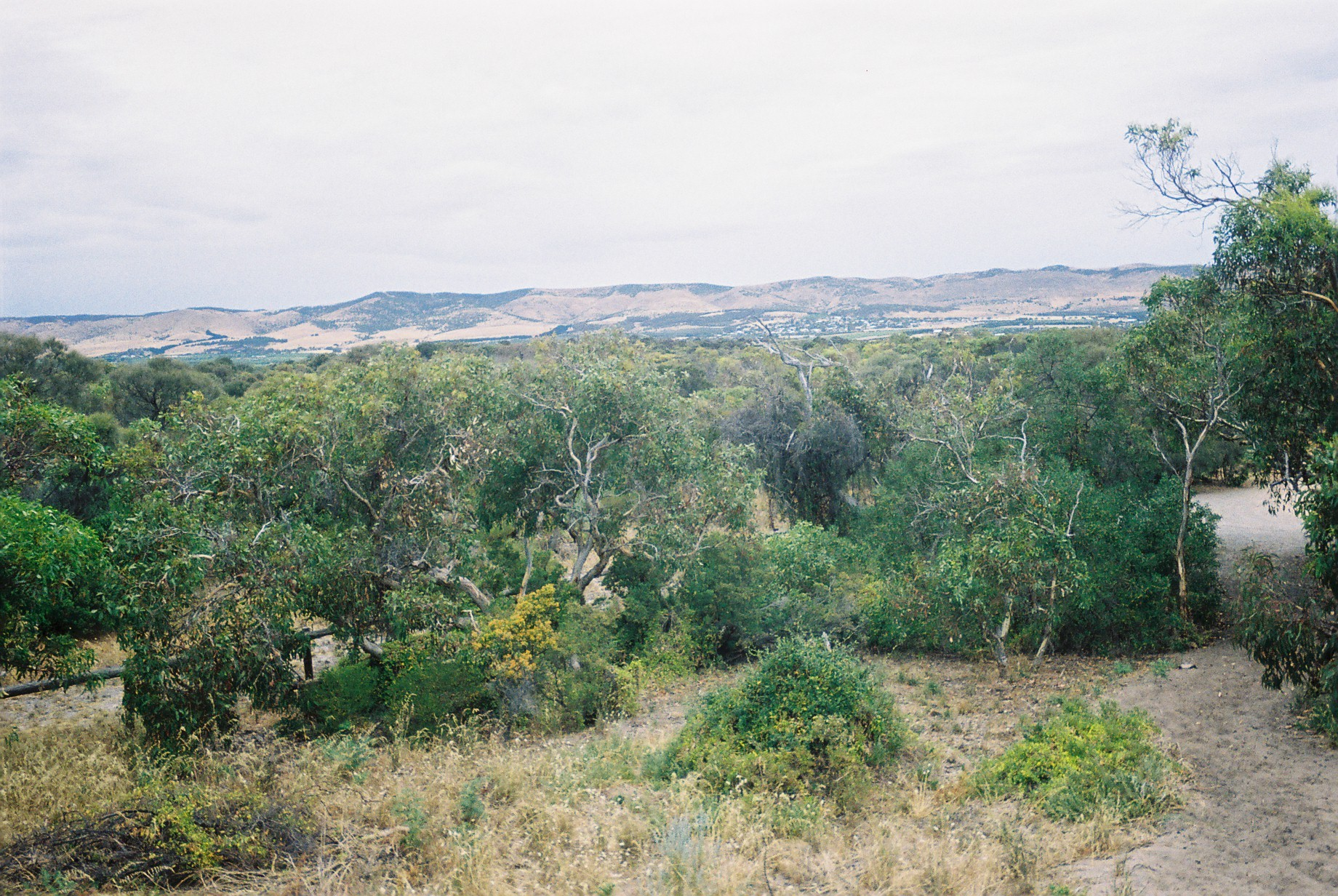
- Reserve as viewed from Seagull Street, Aldinga Beach

- Location within South Australia
- Location: South Australia, Aldinga Beach
- Nearest city: Adelaide
- Coordinates: 35°17′43″S 138°27′16″E
- Area: 2.66 km^{2} (1.03 sq mi)
- Established: 7 November 1985
- Governing body: Department for Environment and Water
- Website: http://www.environment.sa.gov.au/parks/Find_a_Park/Browse_by_region/Fleurieu_Peninsula/Aldinga_Scrub_Conservation_Park

Wangkuntila-Aldinga Conservation Park is a protected area in the Australian state of South Australia located in the suburb of Aldinga Beach about 46 kilometres (29 miles) south by west of the state capital of Adelaide.

== History ==
Before British colonisation of South Australia, the Kaurna people occupied the land from the Adelaide plains and southwards down western side of the Fleurieu Peninsula. There was a camp at Aldinga known as Camp Coortandillah, and Kaurna people were present living in the Aldinga Scrub until the 1870s, when Bishop Augustus Short sent the remaining people to the mission at Poonindie, thus ending their occupation of the area. After they were removed, some Aboriginal people from the Goolwa area (Ngarrindjeri people) occupied the area. The Kaurna language name of Aldinga was Ngaltingga.

The first European settler, Mr. F. Culley, arrived on the scrubland in 1857. Much effort was made to farm on the land before the World War I, but they all proved futile. The District Council of Willunga feared that the area may cause erosion and thus 300 hectares (740 acres) were purchased to be supervised by the State Planning Authority as an open space reserve.

The conservation park was proclaimed for the purpose of protecting a parcel of undeveloped land considered to be "a significant remnant of the natural habitat that once occurred all along the southern Adelaide coastline".

== Description ==
The conservation park consists of land in the cadastral unit of the Hundred of Willunga consisting of section 821 and land identified as allotments 4, 14, 15 and 100. It came into existence on 7 November 1985 by proclamation under the National Parks and Wildlife Act 1972 in respect to section 821. The remainder of the land holding was proclaimed on 14 March 1991. As of 2016, it covered an area of 2.66 hectares (6.6 acres).

It is positioned in the Willunga sub-basin and is characterised by a backdrop of sand dunes, sand blows and small coastal vegetation. It contains an extensive range of rare plants and is considered as an important region for the conservation of flora and fauna. Some of the rare plants include Lacy coral lichen, nardoo, hairy sedge and various species of orchids. Short-beaked echidnas, lizards, bats and several birds form a part of its ecosystem.

The conservation park is classified as an IUCN Category III protected area.

== See also ==
- List of protected areas in Adelaide
