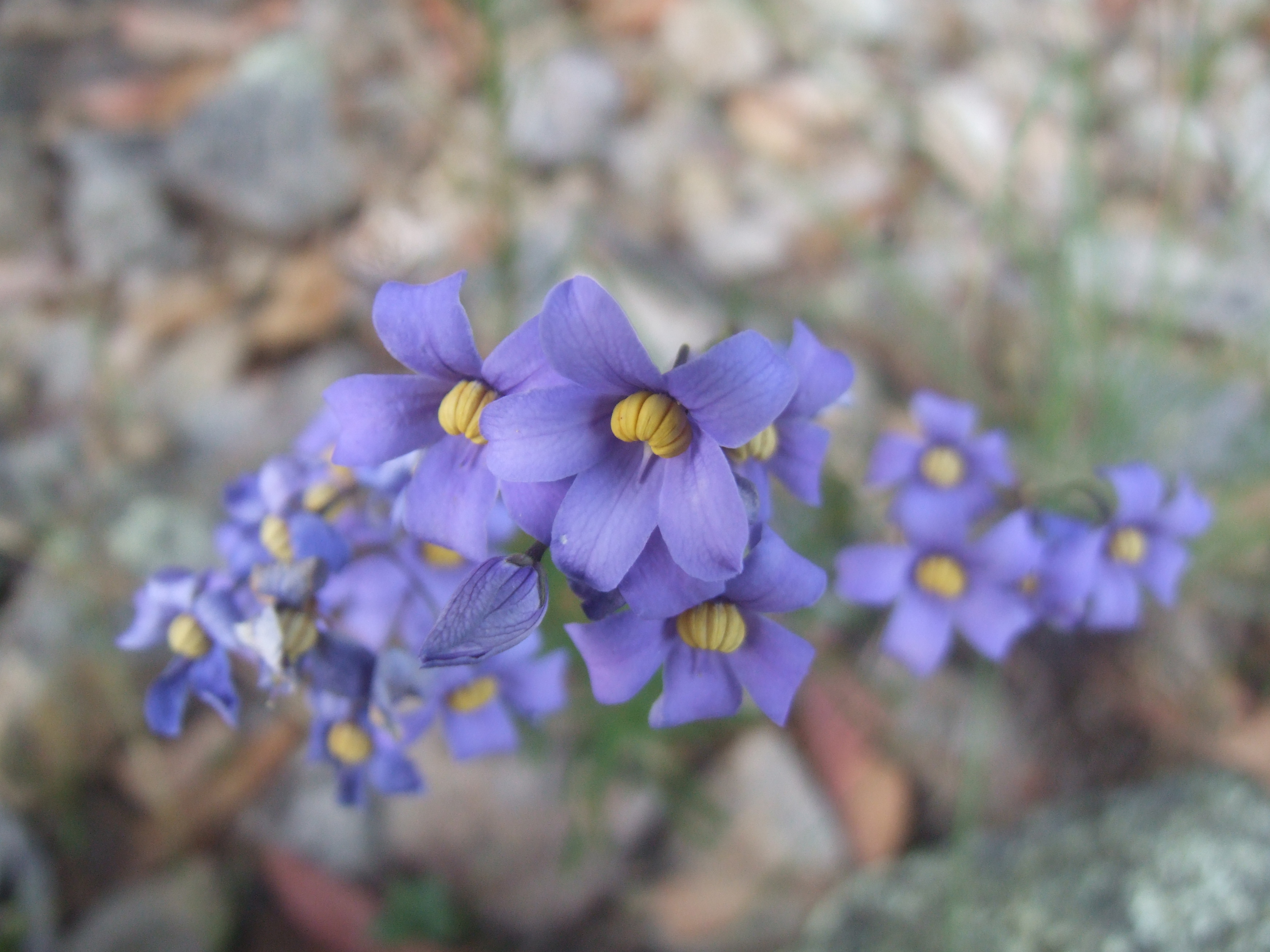
- Cheiranthera telfordii

Scientific classification
- Kingdom: Plantae
- Clade: Tracheophytes
- Clade: Angiosperms
- Clade: Eudicots
- Clade: Asterids
- Order: Apiales
- Family: Pittosporaceae
- Genus: Cheiranthera; A.Cunn. ex Brongn.

Species
- See text

= Cheiranthera =

Genus of flowering plants

Cheiranthera is a genus of ten species of flowering plants in the family Pittosporaceae and are all endemic to Australia. The following is a list of species accepted by the Australian Plant Census as at April 2020:

- Cheiranthera alternifolia E.M.Benn. – S.A., (presumed extinct in Vic.)
- Cheiranthera borealis (E.M.Benn.) L.Cayzer & Crisp – Qld., N.S.W.
- Cheiranthera brevifolia F.Muell. – W.A.
- Cheiranthera filifolia Turcz. – W.A.
- Cheiranthera linearis A.Cunn. ex Lindl. – N.S.W., A.C.T., Vic.
- Cheiranthera parviflora Benth. – W.A.
- Cheiranthera preissiana Putt. – W.A.
- Cheiranthera simplicifolia (E.M.Benn.) L.Cayzer & Crisp – W.A.
- Cheiranthera telfordii L.Cayzer & Crisp – N.S.W.
- Cheiranthera volubilis Benth. – S.A.
