= Myponga, South Australia =

Myponga
- Town
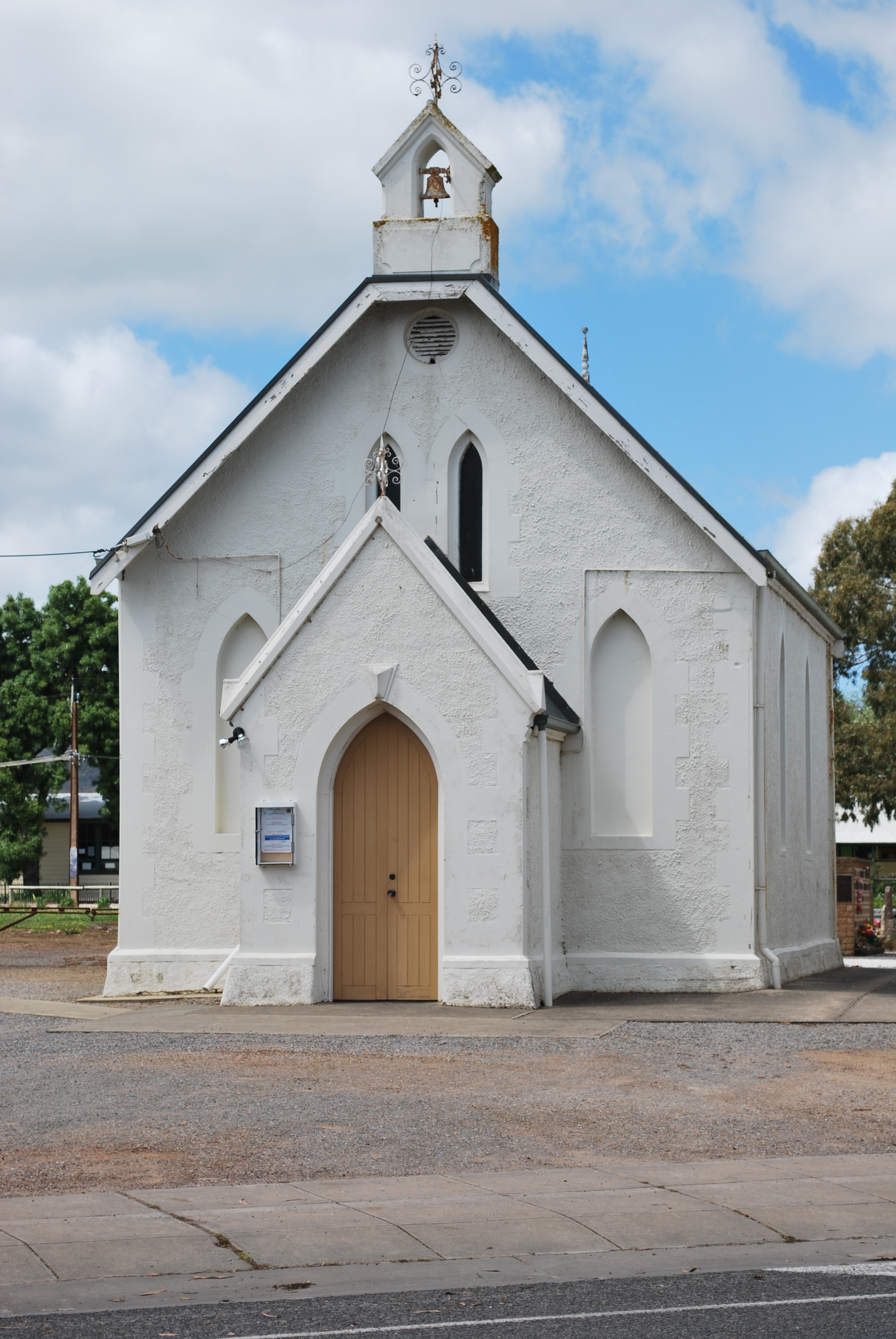
- Uniting church

- Coordinates: 35°24′20″S 138°28′11″E
- Country: Australia
- State: South Australia
- Region: Fleurieu and Kangaroo Island
- LGA: District Council of Yankalilla
- Location: 53 km (33 mi) S of Adelaide; 12 km (7.5 mi) NE of Yankalilla
- Established: 1858 (sub-division); 5 August 1999 (locality)

Government
  - State electorate: Mawson
  - Federal division: Mayo
- Elevation (weather station): 216 m (709 ft)

Population
  - Totals: 393 (urban centre) (2016 census); 744 (2016 census)
- Time zone: UTC+9:30 (ACST)
  - Summer (DST): UTC+10:30 (ACST)
- Postcode: 5202
- County: Hindmarsh
- Mean max temp: 19.4 °C (66.9 °F)
- Mean min temp: 7.5 °C (45.5 °F)
- Annual rainfall: 756.3 mm (29.78 in)
Localities around Myponga
Sellicks Hill; Myponga Beach	Sellicks Hill	Pages Flat
Myponga Beach; Wattle Flat	Myponga	Mount Compass; Hindmarsh Tiers; Inman Valley
Wattle Flat; Inman Valley	Inman Valley	Inman Valley

Myponga is a settlement in South Australia. At the 2016 census, the locality had a population of 744, of whom 393 lived in its town centre. Myponga is located within the federal division of Mayo, the state electoral district of Mawson, and the local government area of the District Council of Yankalilla.

== History ==
Before British colonisation of South Australia, the Kaurna people occupied the land from the Adelaide plains and southwards down western side of the Fleurieu Peninsula, including Myponga. The Kaurna name for the area was Maitpungga. Geoff Manning reports that "according to H.C. Talbot it is derived from the Aboriginal word miappunga – 'divorced wife'", and Norman Tindale concluded that it probably meant "vegetable food place, from [mai] and [pangkara], a term applied to swamps & lagoons". However linguist Rob Amery of the University of Adelaide and Kaurna educator Jack Buckskin concluded that it was just a name and does not have a literal translation.

One of the first pioneer families to settle the area, was the family of Con Polden and Mary Windsor (c.1840) along with their children from Wiltshire in South West England. Myponga began as a settlement as a series of land purchases on section 521 of the cadastral unit of the Hundred of Myponga in 1858. In 1939, a sub-division was laid out on part of Section 521. Boundaries for the locality were created on 5 August 1999 for the "long established name."

On 31 January 1971, Myponga was home to the Myponga Open Air Festival, where Daddy Cool and Black Sabbath played. It was Black Sabbath's first live performance in Australia. The reported attendance was 15,000 people.

== Weather station ==
Myponga has been the site of an official weather station since 1914.

Climate data for Myponga, South Australia
Month	Jan	Feb	Mar	Apr	May	Jun	Jul	Aug	Sep	Oct	Nov	Dec	Year
Mean daily maximum °C (°F)	26.9 (80.4)	25.8 (78.4)	23.9 (75.0)	20.4 (68.7)	16.1 (61.0)	14.0 (57.2)	12.6 (54.7)	13.5 (56.3)	15.9 (60.6)	18.6 (65.5)	21.7 (71.1)	23.6 (74.5)	19.4 (66.9)
Mean daily minimum °C (°F)	11.6 (52.9)	11.8 (53.2)	9.8 (49.6)	7.5 (45.5)	6.4 (43.5)	4.6 (40.3)	4.3 (39.7)	4.6 (40.3)	5.3 (41.5)	6.6 (43.9)	8.2 (46.8)	9.8 (49.6)	7.5 (45.5)
Average rainfall mm (inches)	23.6 (0.93)	27.4 (1.08)	24.3 (0.96)	55.4 (2.18)	93.4 (3.68)	112.3 (4.42)	115.9 (4.56)	97.3 (3.83)	83.4 (3.28)	58.5 (2.30)	38.0 (1.50)	31.4 (1.24)	756.3 (29.78)
Average rainy days	2.8	2.9	3.5	7	10.8	12.1	13.5	12.9	10.2	8.1	5.5	4.3	93.6

== See also ==
- Myponga Reservoir
- Nixon-Skinner Conservation Park
- Yulte Conservation Park
