= Torrens Island (disambiguation) =

Torrens Island is an island in South Australia.

Torrens Island may also refer to the following places in South Australia.

- Torrens Island Power Station, a power station
- Torrens Island Concentration Camp, former internment facility
- Torrens Island Conservation Park, a protected area
- Torrens Island Quarantine Station, a former quarantine facility
- Torrens Island, South Australia, a suburb

== See also ==
- Torrens (disambiguation)
