= Wyreema =

Australian steamship

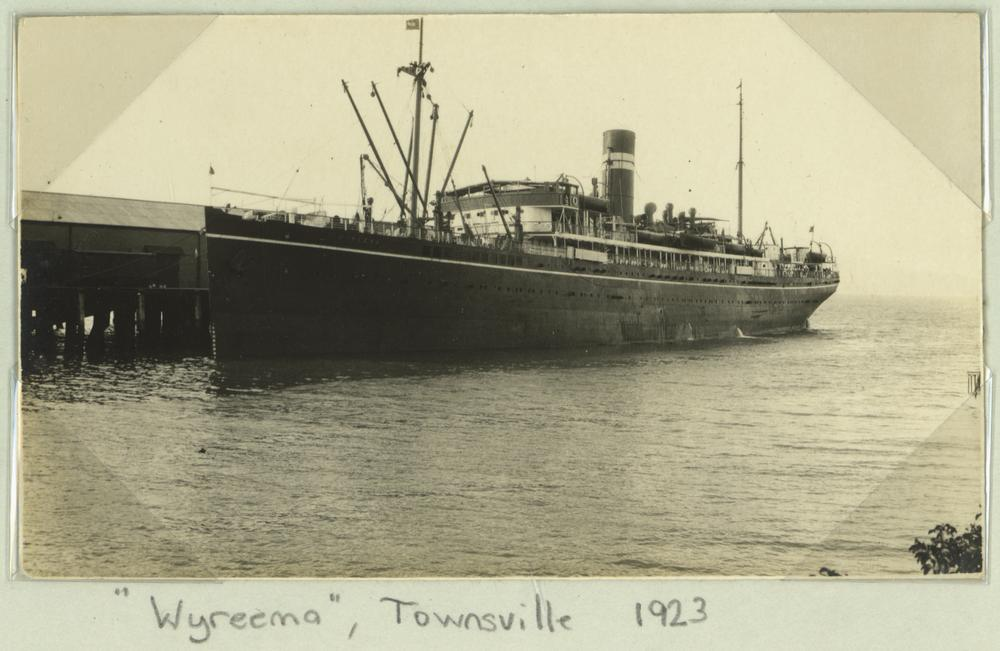
- Wyreema docked at Townsville, 1923

History
- Namesake: Māori: Meeting Place of Three Rivers
- Owner: Australian United Steam Navigation Company (A.U.S.N.)
- Builder: A. Stephen & Sons, Glasgow
- Launched: 20 November 1907
- Completed: 1908
- Fate: Broken up 1958, Rio de Janeiro, Brazil

General characteristics
- Tonnage: 6,388 GRT, 3,362 NRT
- Length: 400 ft (120 m)
- Beam: 54 ft (16 m)
- Installed power: Triple expansion steam
- Propulsion: Twin screw
- Speed: 16 knots (30 km/h; 18 mph)

Wyreema was an Australian steamship.

In April 1908, the newly-built Wyreemba arrived in Brisbane from London.

On 8 March 1910, Wyreema collided with and sank SS Currajong in Sydney Harbour. Hans Neilsen, a crew member of the Currajong, died as a result. The inquest into his death found the collision was due to the culpable negligence of the Wyreema's captain, John Elliott Meaburn, and committed him for trial on the charge of manslaughter. However, the New South Wales Attorney General did not proceed with the prosecution. In June 1910, the Marine Court suspended Meaburn for 12 months. It was noted that he had a long and excellent record as a ship's master and there was a pilot on board at the time of the collision, but that the presence of the pilot did not alter the master's responsibility.

Wyreema was a passenger liner that was hired to transport Australian Army Nursing Service nurses to Europe during World War I. However, with the end of the war, she was recalled from South Africa. Nurses from the ship were then volunteers at the Woodman Point Quarantine Station in Western Australia, nursing soldiers who were Spanish flu victims who landed from the ship Boonah.

In 1926, she was sold to Brazil and was renamed Dom Pedro I.
