= Barker Inlet =

Inlet in South Australia

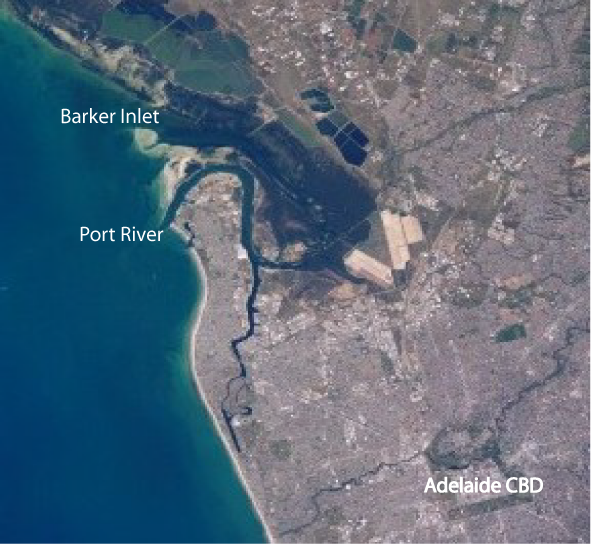
- The inlet in relation to Adelaide's Central business district

- Location within South Australia
- Location: South Australia
- Coordinates: 34°44′42″S 138°30′00″E
- Type: Inlet
- Etymology: Collet Barker
- Part of: Gulf St Vincent
- River sources: Dry Creek, Little Para River
- Basin countries: Australia
- Settlements: Adelaide

The Barker Inlet is a tidal inlet of the Gulf St Vincent in Adelaide, South Australia, named after Captain Collet Barker who first sighted it in 1831. It contains one of the southernmost mangrove forests in the world, a dolphin sanctuary, seagrass meadows and is an important fish and shellfish breeding ground. The inlet separates Torrens Island and Garden Island from the mainland to the east, and is characterised by a network of tidal creeks, artificially deepened channels, and wide mudflats. The extensive belt of mangroves are bordered by samphire saltmarsh flats and low-lying sand dunes.

There are two boardwalks (at Garden Island and St Kilda), and ships graveyards in Broad Creek, Angas Inlet and the North Arm (which is just south of North Arm Creek). The Eastern Passage runs between Garden Island and the mainland, narrowing to form Angas Channel north of North Arm Creek.

The inlet has been adversely impacted since the settlement of South Australia, with stormwater and raw sewage discharge, fishing, landfill rubbish dumping, power generation and other activities adversely affecting its flora and fauna. Much of this has changed with the landfill dump on adjacent Garden Island being closed in 2000 and remediation work begun. Some stormwater is now being filtered through wetlands before discharge and the inlet has been declared a reserve for the preservation of dolphins, fish, crabs and aquatic plants. The mangroves and waterways are still affected by the adjacent former salt crystallization pans (closed in 2014), hot wastewater discharge from Torrens Island power station, heavy metal contamination from stormwater and treated sewage, and disturbances from boat traffic.

== Physical structure ==
Barker Inlet is a shallow tidal inlet which, with the adjacent Port River Estuary, formed during the Holocene by the progressive extension of the Lefevre Peninsula by northward littoral drift of sand carried by wave action along the eastern shore of Gulf St Vincent.

It has a narrow central channel used for boating. Spring tides are over 2 1/2 metres and at low tide much of the inlet is mudflats that are above water level. Most of the creeks through the mangroves drain surrounding land and are not navigable except at high tide by very small boats. There is an artificial channel, running along the side of a breakwater, from a boat ramp at St Kilda near the inlet's northern end. The coast side of the mangroves are bounded by extensive salt evaporation ponds leased for industrial usage by the South Australian Government. Most of these salt fields are no longer used.

Most of the creeks on the eastern side are tidal, although Swan Alley creek is the outlet for the Dry Creek and the Little Para River, and the North Arm Creek for the Barker Inlet Wetlands. The wetlands were created in 1994 as part of a stormwater treatment system with both tidal and freshwater sections. There is 1.72 km^{2} (0.66 sq mi) of constructed wetlands holding 1.2 gigalitres of stormwater before discharging via the creek.

== Flora and fauna ==
=== Flora ===
The grey mangroves are uniformly of the type Avicennia marina var. resinifera and cover most of the pre-settlement area, but the surrounding samphire salt flats have been greatly reduced in size by changes in the landform with Tecticornia flabelliformis now listed as threatened in the area. The inlet's deeper sections are dominated by strap or tape weed (Posidonia spp.). Eelgrass (Zostera muelleri) and garweed (Heterozostera tasmanica) dominate the shallows, often being exposed on mudflats at low tide.

=== Fauna ===
Over 70 species of fish have been recorded, along with over 110 of crustaceans and almost 50 of molluscs including species such as western king prawns, King George and yellowfin whiting and blue swimmer crabs. Many bird species use the inlet including cormorants, terns, ducks, swans, pelicans, egrets and herons, as well as silver gulls and white-bellied sea eagles. Including migratory birds, over 250 species have been recorded in the inlet, surrounding wetlands and lagoons.

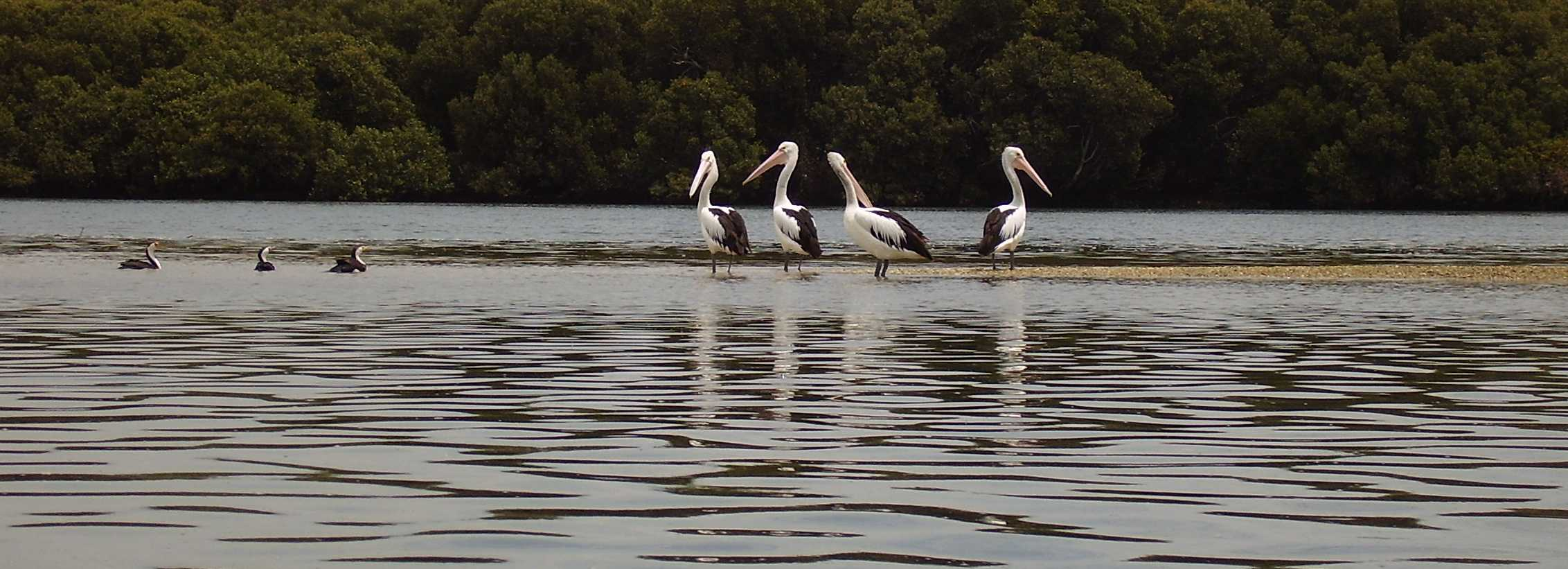
Pelicans on mudflats, Barker Inlet

== Former uses ==
From 1906 until 1972, the inlet's Broad Creek was used as a landing point for explosives that were then transported by a 2.4 km (1.5 miles) tramway to the Dry Creek explosives depot. There are abandoned ships in Broad Creek, Angas Inlet and the North Arm of the Port River. The remains of over 30 iron and wooden ships abandoned up until 1945 are now bird roosts and a canoeing attraction.

== Protected areas and other designations ==
=== Reserves declared by the South Australian government ===
The Barker Inlet is associated with the following protected areas - the Adelaide Dolphin Sanctuary, the Barker Inlet-St Kilda Aquatic Reserve, the southern part of the St Kilda – Chapman Creek Aquatic Reserve and the Torrens Island Conservation Park.

=== Non-statutory arrangements ===
The Baker Inlet is located both within a nationally recognised wetland system known as 'Barker Inlet & St Kilda' and at the southern extent of an Important Bird Area (IBA) known as the Gulf St Vincent Important Bird Area.

== See also ==
- Adelaide International Bird Sanctuary
