= Torrens =

Torrens may refer to:

== Places ==
=== South Australia ===
- Electoral district of Torrens, a state electoral district
- Lake Torrens, a salt lake north of Adelaide
- River Torrens, which runs through the heart of Adelaide
- City of West Torrens, a local government area in Adelaide
- Torrens Building, a heritage-listed government office building in the Adelaide city centre
- Torrens Island, places associated with Torrens Island northwest of the Adelaide city centre
- Torrens Linear Park, from the hills to the coast along the course of the River Torrens
- Torrens (biogeographic subregion), see Interim Biogeographic Regionalisation for Australia

=== Australia Capital Territory ===
- Torrens, Australian Capital Territory, a suburb of Canberra

=== Other places ===
- Torréns Bridge, a bridge over the Rosario River in Hormigueros municipality, Puerto Rico

== People ==
- Torrens (surname), a list of people
- Torrens Knight (born 1969), Ulster loyalist and alleged police informer

== Other uses ==
- HMAS Torrens, two ships and a shore base of the Royal Australian Navy
- Torrens (clipper ship) (1875–1910)
- MS Torrens (1939), a Norwegian general cargo ship
- Torrens Transit, a bus company providing public transport in Adelaide, South Australia
- Torrens Connect, an Australian company that is owned by the above company
- Torrens University Australia, a for-profit university in South Australia

== See also ==
- Torrens Act (disambiguation)
- Torrens Parade Ground, a former military installation in South Australia
- Torrens title, a system of land title first introduced by Sir Robert Torrens
