= Torrens (surname) =

Torrens is a surname. Notable people with the surname include:

- Alba Torrens (born 1989), Spanish basketball player
- Albert Torrens (born 1976), Australian rugby league footballer
- Attwood Torrens (1874–1916), English cricketer and soldier
- Cristina Torrens Valero (born 1974), professional female tennis player from Spain
- Henry Torrens (British Army officer, born 1833) (1823–1889), British lieutenant general and colonial governor
- Henry Torrens (British Army officer, born 1779) (1779–1828), British major general and Adjutant-General to the Forces
- Hugh Torrens, British historian of geology and paleontology
- Jackie Torrens, Canadian writer, actor, documentary-maker and journalist
- James H. Torrens (1874–1952), American congressman and influential Tammany Hall figure
- Jonathan Torrens (born 1972), Canadian actor and television personality, brother of Jackie Torrens
- Luis Torrens (born 1996), Venezuelan baseball player
- Philip Torrens (born 1960), British actor (a.k.a. Pip Torrens)
- Robert Richard Torrens (1812–1884), third Premier of colonial South Australia
- Robert Torrens (economist) (1780–1864), Chairman of the South Australian Colonisation Commissioners, and father of the above
- Robert Torrens (judge) (1775–1856), Irish judge and brother of Major-General Henry Torrens
- Roy Torrens (born 1948), Northern Irish cricketer
- Sticky Torrens (born 1949), Irish racing driver
- William McCullagh Torrens (1813–1894), Irish Liberal politician and member of the House of Commons for various English constituencies

== See also ==
- Torrens (disambiguation)
- Michael Torrens-Spence (1914–2001), British officer in three services and the Royal Ulster Constabulary
