= Port River =

Tidal estuary north of Adelaide, South Australia

Port River Port Adelaide
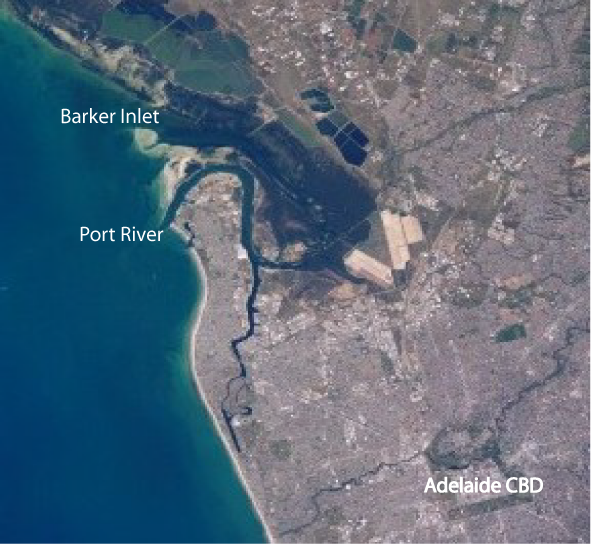
- The Port River in relation to Adelaide city centre, the redirected River Torrens, and the adjacent Barker Inlet

- Location of the river mouth in South Australia

Location
- Country: Australia
- State: South Australia
- Region: Western Adelaide
- Municipality: City of Port Adelaide Enfield

Physical characteristics
- Source: Semaphore Park
  - coordinates: 34°51′S 138°29′E
- Mouth: Gulf St Vincent
  - location: Outer Harbor
  - coordinates: 34°47′S 138°28′E
  - elevation: 0 m (0 ft)

Basin features
- Tributaries
  - right: North Arm
- Bridges: Outer Harbor railway line; Jervois; Birkenhead; Tom 'Diver' Derrick; Mary MacKillop

The Port River (officially known as the Port Adelaide River) is part of a tidal estuary located north of the Adelaide city centre in the Australian state of South Australia. It has been used as a shipping channel since the beginning of European settlement of South Australia in 1836, when Colonel Light selected the site to use as a port. Before colonisation, the Port River region and the estuary area were known as Yerta Bulti (or Yertabulti) by the Kaurna people, and used extensively as a source of food and plant materials to fashion artefacts used in daily life.

The Port River dolphins are a popular tourist attraction.

== Geography ==
The Port River is the western branch of the largest tidal estuary on the eastern side of Gulf St Vincent. The whole estuarine area, sometimes called the Port River estuary, includes Barker Inlet, Torrens Island, Garden Island, and to a greater or lesser extent touches the suburbs of St Kilda, Bolivar, Dry Creek, Port Adelaide, New Port, and (up the eastern flank of the Lefevre Peninsula), Taperoo, Osborne and Outer Harbor.

Sections of the river bank are variously developed for shipping, industrial and increasingly, residential use. The rich ecosystem of the river, which includes mangroves, seagrass, waterbirds, and abundant marine life, has been historically impacted by industrialisation and associated pollution. In the 21st century, reductions in pollution loads have allowed for environmental recovery aided by several restoration programs.

The estuary includes several overlapping protected areas, including the Adelaide Dolphin Sanctuary and the Gulf St Vincent Important Bird Area, a number of ships' graveyards and other places of heritage interest.

There are three road bridges and two railway bridges over the river. Its southern end abuts the West Lakes recreational body of water.

== Naming ==
Before British colonisation of South Australia, the Kaurna people called the Port River region and estuary Yerta Bulti (also spelt Yertabulti), meaning "land of sleep or death", while the Port Adelaide location was known as Yartapuulti. The river is now officially known as the Port Adelaide River, while the name Port River is described in official sources as "a local variant."

== History ==
=== Pre-colonial ===
Prior to the 1836 British colonisation of South Australia, the river was a shallow and narrow tidal creek winding between mangrove swamps. At this time, it was inhabited by the Kaurna people, who occupied the land from Cape Jervis in the south up the western side of the Fleurieu Peninsula, to Crystal Brook in the north, west to the Mount Lofty Ranges, across to Gulf Saint Vincent, including the Adelaide Plains and city of Adelaide.

The Kaurna people made use of the natural resources; for example, they used to trap and spear fish (kuya), lobsters (ngaultaltya) and birds (parriparu), and also gathered bird's eggs, black river mussels (kakirra, species Alathyria jacksoni), periwinkle (kulutunumi), river crawfish (kunggurla – probably common yabby), clams, native mud oysters and blue swimmer crabs. However, they did not kill the black swans, as this was forbidden. The reeds, blue flax lily and rushes (probably Juncus kraussii, the salt marsh rush) were used for weaving baskets and nets – the latter used for not only fish, but game such as kangaroo and emu. Dolphins were known as yambo.

At that time, a large sand dune known as the Gillman Dunal system stretched inland across the southern part of the area, where the people camped for years even after European settlement.

The Lartelare Park, situated just north of the current Jervois Bridge on the western bank, in the suburb of New Port, was established in 2009 to commemorate the site of a Kaurna campsite which existed there for thousands of years until 1858, when it was relocated further south to the mouth of the Jervois Creek, where there was an oyster bed well known to both Kaurna and colonists. Numerous shell middens and tools were discovered during construction of the park. Jervois Creek was later filled in, and the current bridge (built 1969) was constructed over the oyster bed.

=== After 1834 ===
The river was officially "discovered" in 1834 by Captain John Jones, after an 1831 sighting by Captain Collet Barker. The initial landing place in Adelaide, chosen by Colonel William Light in late November 1836, was south of the current port and is now part of West Lakes. It had such poor conditions that for many years it was also known as "Port Misery", later becoming known as the Old Port. In 1837 a harbour was declared when harbourmaster Captain Thomas Lipson took up residence on the shore of the then named port creek with the first migrants landing in the same year, onto the river bank lined with mangroves, until a canal was cut through them to a higher location in the sand dunes. A wharf was built at what is now the corner of the Old Port Road and Frederick Road, at Royal Park/Queenstown.

The McLaren Wharf was built in 1839, and the port was opened at its current location (now Port Adelaide) in October 1840.

Port Adelaide became a hub for the oyster trade, owing to the abundance of native mud oysters and other shellfish in the river. Aquaculture took place from the late 1850s to the 1910s around Jervois Bridge, and oysters were also shipped to the port from the Spencer Gulf.

Owing to the shallow depth of the river, a new harbour was authorised for construction at Outer Harbor in 1902, and completed in 1908. This new harbour allowed the larger steamships that were then arriving at Adelaide to dock, with smaller steam vessels and sailboats able to use the old port facilities.

The river was first bridged in 1859 by the Port Bridge a wooden footbridge, which allowed people to move onto the Lefevre Peninsula.

== Course and features ==
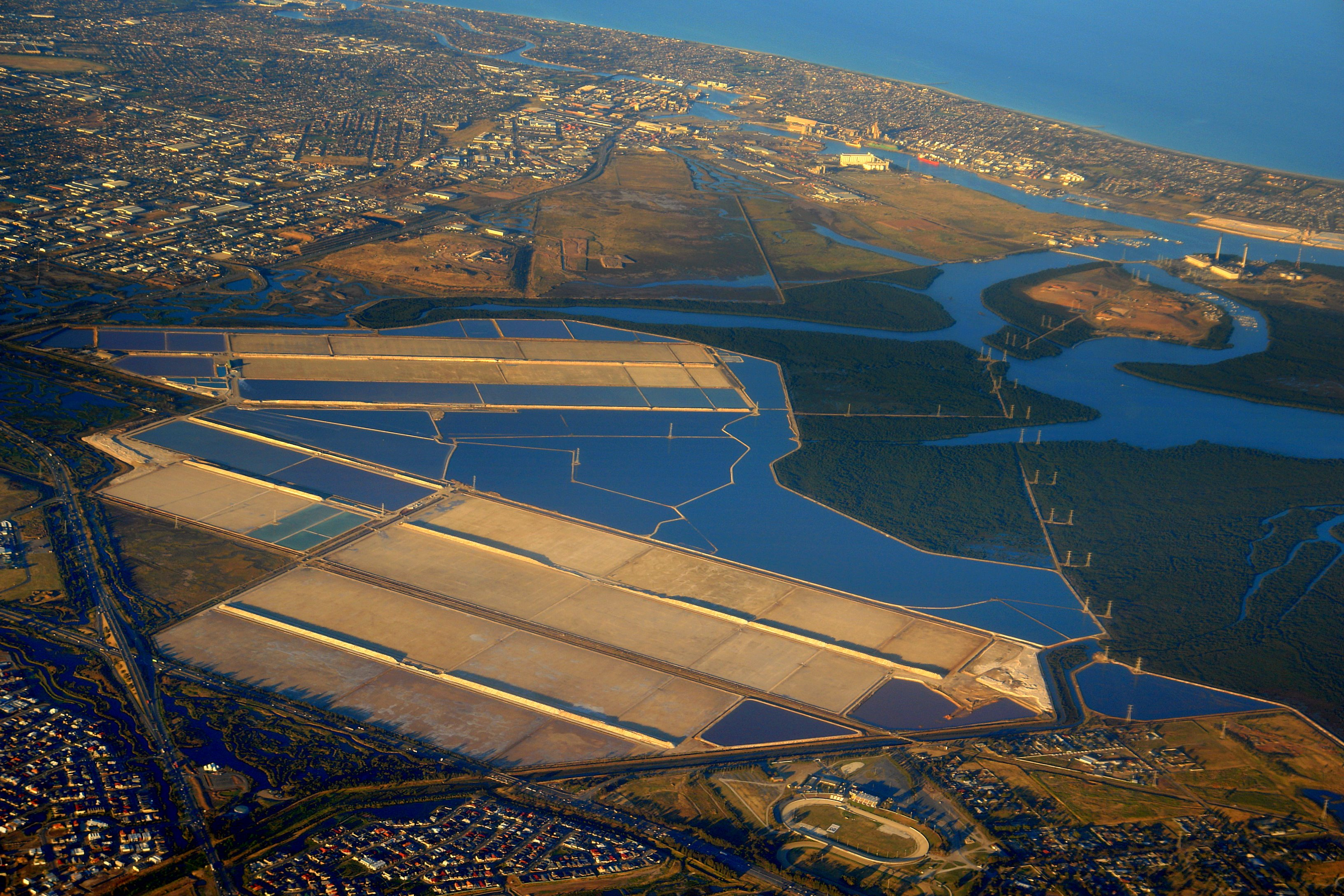
Aerial view of the Port River estuary

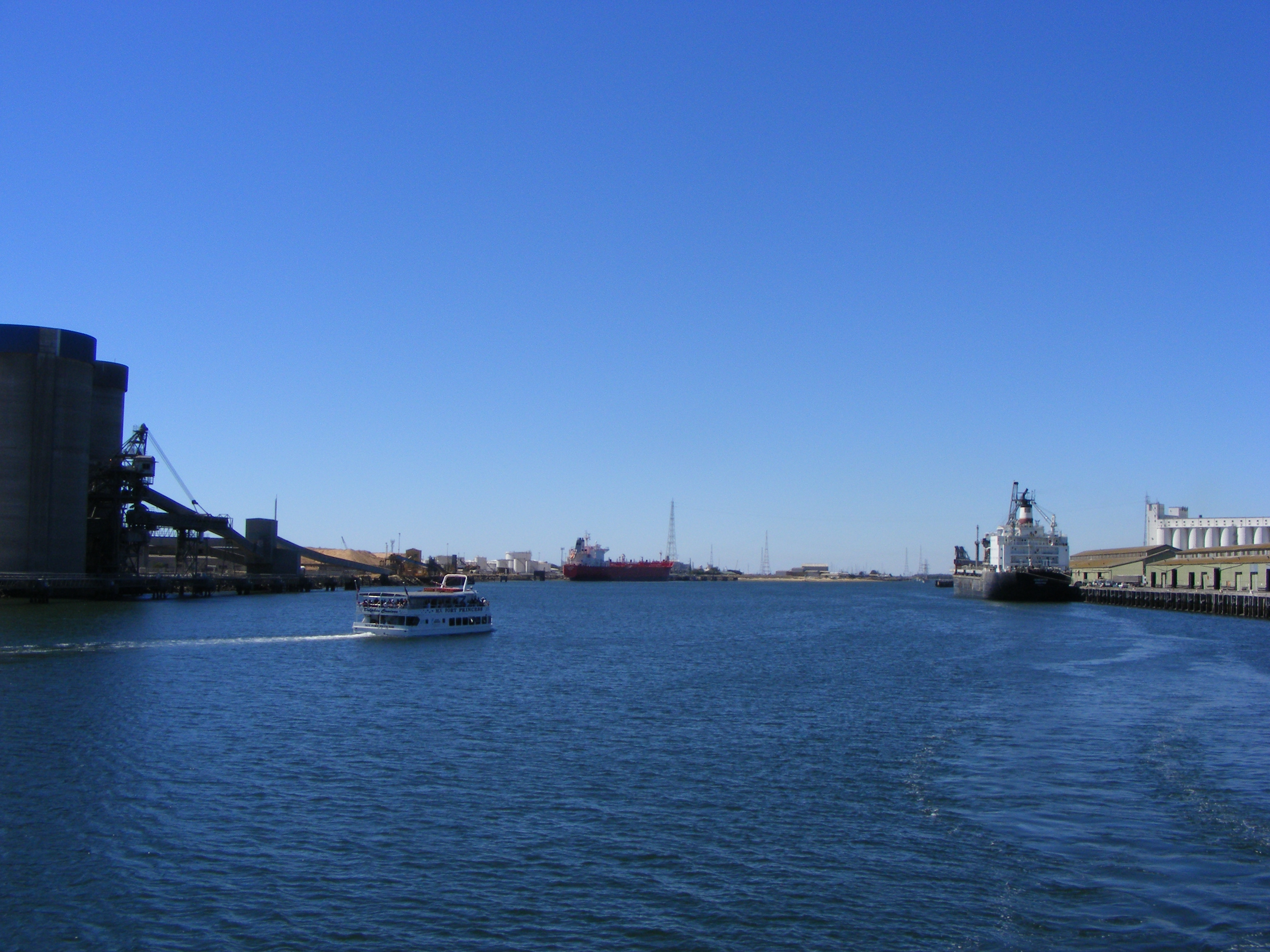
Pleasure cruise, merchant ships and industry on the river

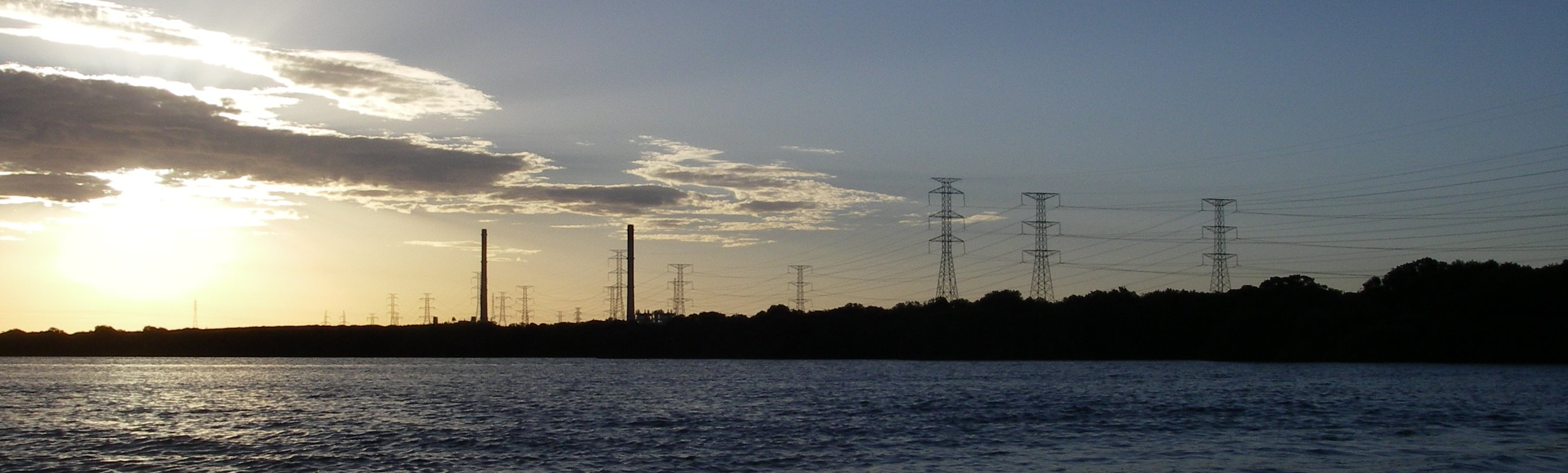
Torrens Island Power Station and transmission lines viewed from North Arm Creek

Before European settlement of Adelaide's western suburbs and the construction of various flood mitigation channels and levees, the Port River formed one of the outlets of the River Torrens. The Torrens used to flow north-west into the Port River, until sediment accumulated upstream built up, blocking the channels and forming a large area of marshland known as "the Reedbeds" across some of the present western suburbs. In 1937 a channel known as the Breakout Creek was constructed to take the Torrens westwards to the sea.

The Port River is the western branch of the largest tidal estuary on the eastern side of Gulf St Vincent. It extends inland through the historic Inner Harbour of Port Adelaide, to the constructed salt-water West Lakes in the north-western suburbs of Adelaide. The lower reaches of the Port River flow between the Lefevre Peninsula, and the Section Banks and Torrens Island, and form the sea entrance to the port facilities of Adelaide.

Section Banks is artificial island made of seashell-grit, clay and sand, around 1,600 metres (5,200 ft) long, created partly by natural processes but also by manmade construction, at the northern end of the Outer Harbor breakwater. It provides a nesting and breeding area for seabirds, and is known as Bird Island (or Northern Breakwater; see also below).

The Port River estuary connects to the Barker Inlet to the east via the North Arm to the south of Garden Island and Angas Inlet to its north. Light Passage lies between Pelican Point and Torrens Island.

=== Bridges ===
In 1878 the original Jervois Bridge opened, replacing the 1859 footbridge. It incorporated a swing bridge mechanism to allow ships to pass, but it fell into disrepair after the Birkenhead Bridge, which was the first bascule (moving) bridge in Australia, was opened in the 1940s. In 1966, the new Jervois Bridge opened, a steel bridge built a little way upstream of the original one.

In the 2000s, the Port River Expressway was constructed, with the road bridge across the Port River opening on 3 August 2008, named the Tom 'Diver' Derrick Bridge. The Expressway links Hanson Road, South Road and the Salisbury Highway with the port. A railway bridge was constructed as part of the project.

Today the river is crossed by Mary MacKillop opening rail bridge, the Expressway bridge, the Birkenhead Bridge, the Jervois Bridge, and a railway bridge carrying the Outer Harbor railway line. Bower Road crosses the southern extremity of the river, with West Lakes on the other side.

== Shipping and industrial use ==
The banks of the river are largely industrialised and have some of Adelaide's wharves, bulk cargo and container handling facilities. Large ship transport vessels use the river's main channel. Port Adelaide is a tidal port, with several shipping berths along the length of the estuary, from the western side of the Lefevre Peninsula, along Outer Harbor, Osborne, to its innermost berths at Inner Harbour.

The shipping channel has been dredged at various instances since the establishment of Port Adelaide to accommodate larger vessels. Dredging occurred most recently between June and September 2019. That dredging widened the basin and deepened the channel in order to accommodate Post-Panamax container ships and larger cruise ships to benefit the tourism industry.

ASC (formerly the Australian Submarine Corporation) has its construction and maintenance facility and dock at Osborne.

There is a heritage-listed former Quarantine Station on Torrens Island and a small timber jetty adjacent to it.

Torrens Island Power Station and the Pelican Point Power Station, draw seawater from the Port River for cooling purposes and return it at an elevated temperature.

The worst environmental disaster to occur in South Australian marine waters was the St Kilda salt fields brine spill, which killed of hectares of mangroves, samphires and other vegetation. As of 2022, elevated salinity levels in the estuary near the salt fields remain problematic.

== Recreational use and attractions ==
There are some remnant mangroves in places along the estuary. One of its main attractions other than transport is the Port River dolphins, which are the only wild dolphins in the world that live within a city. The Adelaide Dolphin Sanctuary includes all of the Port River estuary and includes a stretch of the sea northwards past St Kilda.

A fishing fleet operates out of the North Arm, which also has a speed boat club. Recreational boating marinas are located in the Angas Inlet and on the Lefevre Peninsula.

The Port Adelaide Rowing Club, established around 1877, and was situated at Inner Harbour until 1957, when it moved to Largs North. and the river was formerly a frequent venue for the Intervarsity eights race.

After water pollution levels were shown to have improved in December 2016, the annual "Long Swim" recommenced in the Inner Harbour, after a hiatus of some years.

=== Port Adelaide Kaurna Cultural Heritage Trail ===
The Port Adelaide Kaurna Cultural Heritage Trail is marked nearby to the Ship's Graveyard, and extends to both sides of the river between the two bridges. It is marked by six Kaurna significant sites, and interpretive signs explain many aspects of Kaurna culture and life on the estuary. (See also History, above.)

=== Ships' graveyards ===
There are ships' graveyards at Angas Inlet and Broad Creek in the Barker Inlet. Broad Creek contains the wrecks of the Dorothy S and No. 1 Hulk, while the remains in Angas Inlet are either not confirmed or unidentified recreational craft.

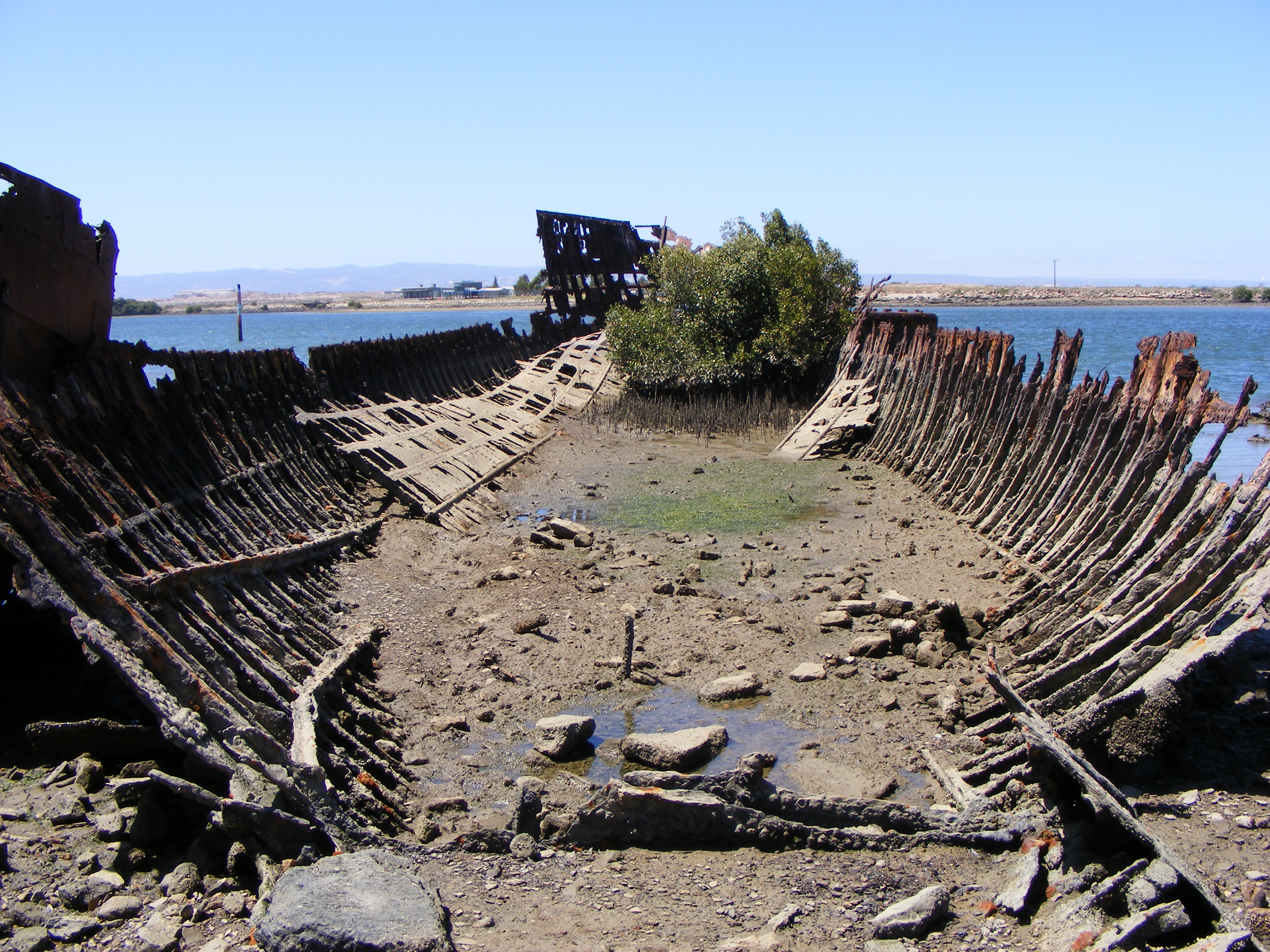
Wreck of the Sunbeam in the Garden Island graveyard

Further up-river, with Ethelton on one side and Port Adelaide on the other, in a part of the river known as Port Creek, is the Jervois Basin Ships' Graveyard. Several wrecks lie in a "ship graveyard" between the Outer Harbor railway line bridge and the Jervois Bridge: the ketch Alert, barge Trafalgar, schooner Fides, the timber hulk Fitzjames (which was for some time a floating boys' reformatory, later relocated to Magill Reformatory), the Fish Market Pontoon, and the Unnamed Pontoon.

Tam O'Shanter Creek is on the Port Adelaide side of the river here, and further north on the Glanville side is Hawker Creek.

Mutton Cove Ships' Graveyard is within the Mutton Cove Conservation Reserve. The wreck of the former steel steamship Excelsior, later used as a coal hulk, lies at the northern end of the cove, near Pelican Point. The former iron barge, later paddleboat, known as Jupiter lies overgrown with mangroves towards the southern end of the park.

The North Arm contains another significant ships graveyard, now known as Garden Island Ships' Graveyard, which includes 25 identified wrecks. It was also used to house explosives stores from the 1880s. The remains of the iron and wooden ships that were abandoned between 1909 and 1945 are now bird roosts and a canoeing attraction. The ships in the graveyard were launched from 1856 to 1920 and include the Santiago and Dorothy H. Sterling, as well as other sailing ships, steamships and iron barges.

== Estuarine environment ==
=== Ecology ===
The ecology of the estuarine area includes and is dependent on the health of its component parts: the waters, intertidal zone, and lands on the shore. The area includes breeding and feeding grounds for several species of fish and prawn; a combination of resident and migratory birds (including a rookery); and a sanctuary for dolphins. The area is also home to the largest area of mangrove forest, shallow seagrasses and mudflats in Gulf St Vincent.

Spring tides are over 2.5 metres (8 ft 2 in) AHD, and at low tide, mudflats are exposed near the outlet of the river.

=== Changes over time ===
Prior to European settlement of the Adelaide Plains, winter rains over the catchment of the River Torrens created large seasonal inflows of fresh water into the Reedbeds wetlands, which drained north into the Port River and south to the Patawalonga River. In their natural state, the interconnected creeks and channels of the Port River estuary and Barker Inlet were surrounded by mudflats, mangroves, and saltmarshes colonised by samphires. Many of these remain, although the water flows have changed significantly. Tidal movement has a substantial influence on the ecology of the estuarine area's flora and marine fauna. Flows occur from the north (via Outer Harbor) and south (West Lakes, which draws in seawater via an engineered tunnel at Grange).

Since settlement and industrialisation, stormwater has caused pollution in the estuary. Industrial enterprises variously impacted the ecology, with nutrients boosting the growth of algal blooms, various contaminants reducing water quality. Temperature changes caused by effluents from gas-fired power stations at Torrens Island and Pelican Point persist. Sometimes high loads of solid materials have also been discharged into the river, and hyper-saline brine from adjacent saltfields.

Since construction of the Breakout Creek outlet in 1937 to drain the Reedbeds (see above), and the closure of the former Port Adelaide Wastewater Treatment Plant with the diversion of wastewater to Bolivar Waste Water Treatment Plant in 2005, the upper reaches of the Port River now receive only limited amounts of locally derived stormwater, and are now largely marine. Flushing of West Lakes occurs through a one-way system that draws in seawater from the Gulf through an inlet off the coast at the southern end. The Lakes discharge into the upper reaches of the Port River at Ethelton.

The water quality has improved since the reduced flows and improved quality of Bolivar sewerage, and since the closure of Penrice soda ash plant in Osborne in 2014. The soda ash plant was a major ammonia pollution source.

Regular testing by the Environmental Protection Authority took place until 2008, after which only informal testing has occurred. In December 2016, SA Health testing showed very low counts of bacteria, enabling the annual "Long Swim" in the Inner Harbour to recommence after many decades of absence.

=== Species ===
Mangrove forests (consisting of only one species, Avicennia marina var resinifera) remain at Ethelton and New Port, along the shores of Torrens Island, the North Arm (which connects to Barker Inlet) and adjacent to the Mutton Cove Conservation Reserve on the Lefevre Peninsula.

Fish and prawn species found in the estuary include western king prawns, King George Whiting, mullets, bream, and snapper. Attempts are being made to restore the once extensive reefs of shellfish, including native mud oysters (ostrea angasi), cockles, and razorfish (pinna bicolor), which had almost disappeared since European settlement. Beds of razorfish, a large clam with an elongated triangular shell have expanded in recent years (to 2023). Near the outlet of the river, the mudflats are a breeding ground for blue swimmer crabs and other species.

It is estimated that less than one percent of shellfish reefs around South Australia remain, compared with the 1940s. Around 1969, Pacific oysters (Magallana gigas) were introduced for aquaculture in South Australia. After an outbreak of disease in this species, in 2018 the Government of South Australia banned the collection of all shellfish in the Port River. This ban, combined with growing populations of native oysters and razorfish, has led to benefits, such as improving the water quality due to their filter feeding, and providing habitat favoured by other species, such as whiting, bream, and blue swimmer crabs.

The Hercules club mud whelk (Pyrazus ebeninus), which is most abundant in tropical or subtropical waters off Queensland and New South Wales, had not been detected in the Port River since the last ice age around 10,000 years ago. In 2023, recent sightings there were confirmed by researcher Brad Martin. Scientists surmise that they were seeded there by ballast water brought in by ships, and the razorfish and oyster beds provide a nursery for breeding. One sighting was posted on iNaturalist on 28 September 2022. The Sydney cockle is another species which has only recently appeared in the Port River, resulting from warming temperatures.

=== Protected areas ===
Several protected areas are covered by legislation in order to help to maintain the biodiversity of the area, as of 2020 comprising:

- Adelaide Dolphin Sanctuary;
- Adelaide International Bird Sanctuary;
- Barker Inlet – St Kilda Aquatic Reserve:
- Gulf St Vincent Important Bird Area (the mudflats at the mouth of the river);
- Mutton Cove Conservation Reserve;
- St Kilda – Chapman Creek Aquatic Reserve; and
- Torrens Island Conservation Park.

The Adelaide Dolphin Sanctuary is a 118-square-kilometre (46 sq mi) dolphin sanctuary which was enacted by the Adelaide Dolphin Sanctuary Act 2005, covering all of the Barker Inlet and the Port River. Bottlenose dolphins are often seen in the river, examining and following small boats and have become a well known tourist attraction with dolphin cruises departing from Queens Wharf. The industrialised nature of the Port River has led to concern for the welfare of the bottlenose dolphin population and studies have shown that some of the dolphins have very high heavy metal burdens in comparison to dolphins elsewhere.

=== Future environmental risks ===
Climate change is resulting in rising sea levels that threaten to cause erosion and further loss of the mudflats, salt-marsh and mangroves, exacerbated by land subsidence. The water level has been rising at around 2.06 mm (0.081 in) per year at Inner Harbour and 2.08 mm (0.082 in) at Outer Harbor. After the seawall at the Mutton Cove Conservation Reserve was breached by a huge storm in 2016, the area is now regularly flooded by the river. This will cause the samphires to die off and the mangroves to increase.

== See also ==
- Rivers of South Australia
