= Adelaide Dolphin Sanctuary =

Protected area in South Australia

- IUCN category IV (habitat/species management area)
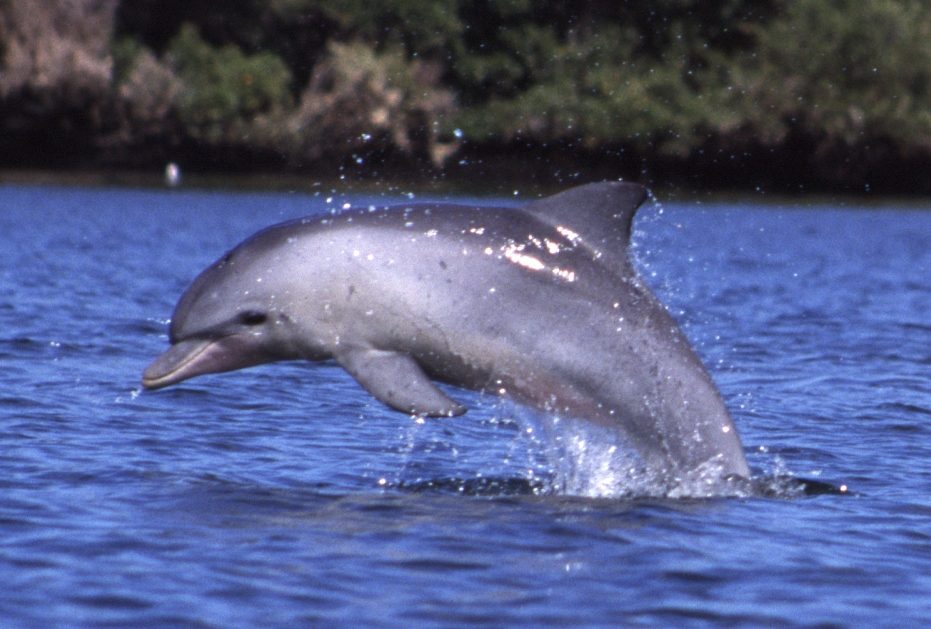
- Dolphin in the Port River

- Location within South Australia
- Location: South Australia
- Nearest city: Port Adelaide
- Coordinates: 34°44′35.15″S 138°29′23.64″E
- Area: 118.75 km^{2} (45.85 sq mi)
- Established: 4 June 2005
- Governing body: National Parks and Wildlife Service South Australia
- Website: http://www.environment.sa.gov.au/parks/Find_a_Park/Browse_by_region/Adelaide/adelaide-dolphin-sanctuary

Adelaide Dolphin Sanctuary (ADS) is a marine protected area in the Australian state of South Australia located on the east coast of Gulf St Vincent in and adjoining the north-western part of Adelaide, covering the estuary of the Port River around Port Adelaide and northwards past St Kilda. It was established in 2005 for the protection of a resident population of Indo-Pacific bottlenose dolphins (Tursiops aduncus).

The dolphins are a focus for both local enthusiasts and tourists.

== Background ==
Dolphin expert Mike Bossley lobbied for the sanctuary from the mid-1990s, becoming interested after reading about a dolphin that swam along next to racehorses being exercised in the water off West Beach, further down the coast. The dolphins in the area are Indo-Pacific bottlenose dolphins.

The sanctuary was proclaimed in 2005 for the purpose of achieving the following two objects:

(a) to protect the dolphin population of the Port Adelaide River estuary and Barker Inlet; and
(b) to protect the natural habitat of that population.

The sanctuary is also required to achieve the following six objectives:

(a) the protection of the dolphin population of the Port Adelaide River estuary and Barker Inlet from direct physical harm is to be maintained and improved;
(b) the key habitat features in the Port Adelaide River estuary and Barker Inlet that are necessary to sustain the dolphin population are to be maintained, protected and restored;
(c) water quality within the Port Adelaide River estuary and Barker Inlet should be improved to a level that sustains the ecological processes, environmental values and productive capacity of the Port Adelaide River estuary and Barker Inlet;
(d) the interests of the community are to be taken into account by recognising indigenous and other cultural, and historical, relationships with the Port Adelaide River estuary and Barker Inlet and surrounding areas, and by ensuring appropriate participation in processes associated with the management of the Port Adelaide River estuary and Barker Inlet;
(e) public awareness of the importance of a healthy Port Adelaide River estuary and Barker Inlet to the economic, social and cultural prosperities of the local communities, and the community more generally, is to be promoted;
(f) the principles of ecological sustainable development in relation to the use and management of the Port Adelaide River estuary and Barker Inlet are to be promoted.

== Governance and description ==
The Adelaide Dolphin Sanctuary (also referred to as the ADS) is managed by the National Parks and Wildlife Service South Australia, an agency within the Department of Environment and Water. In 2015, management activity was supported by a community volunteer group known as the ADS Action Group which was created in 2012 and which had 50 registered volunteers in 2015.

The sanctuary covers an area of coastline extending from Port Gawler in the north to North Haven in the south, and includes the waterways of the Port Adelaide River, the Barker Inlet and some associated channels, as well as Torrens and Garden Islands, and inlets on the Lefevre Peninsula such as Mutton Cove. The habitat protected by the sanctuary consists of "mangroves, seagrass, saltmarsh, tidal flats, tidal creeks and estuarine rivers". As of 2014, it covered an area of 118.75 square kilometres (45.85 sq mi).

The Adelaide Dolphin Sanctuary shares territory with the following protected areas: Barker Inlet-St Kilda Aquatic Reserve; Port Gawler Conservation Park; the majority of the St Kilda – Chapman Creek Aquatic Reserve; Torrens Island Conservation Park; and parts of the Adelaide International Bird Sanctuary National Park—Winaityinaityi Pangkara. These are located in localities and suburbs including Bolivar, Buckland Park, Dry Creek, Globe Derby Park, Port Gawler and St Kilda.

To the south, the sanctuary adjoins the Adelaide Metropolitan Beaches Restricted Area, which extends from North Haven in the north along the Adelaide metropolitan coastline to Sellicks Beach in the south, and which is described in the National Parks and Wildlife (Protected Animals—Marine Mammals) Regulations 2010. Both the sanctuary and the Adelaide Metropolitan Beaches Restricted Area are areas subject to the additional regulatory requirements regarding "commercial activities" in respect to interaction with marine mammals, including all species of dolphins present in South Australia.

The sanctuary is classified as an IUCN Category VI protected area.

The dolphins are a popular tourist attraction, with several boat tours available for viewing them play in the river, and touted as the only city in the world with wild dolphins living in it.

== Dolphin population ==
Two dolphin populations, resident and visiting, have been closely observed by Mike Bossley since the late 1980s. He conducts ongoing research within the Adelaide Dolphin Sanctuary through the not-for-profit organisation Whale and Dolphin Conservation. The dolphins are also observed and photographed informally by volunteer members of the Official Port River Dolphin Watch Facebook group and by tourists. The wild dolphins can be seen from the shore, from boats or kayaks and are an important tourist attraction.

While dolphin deaths in the sanctuary have been recorded before (including two in 1998), a population decline became apparent between the late 2010s and early 2020s.

Around 2013, it was estimated that around 40 dolphins could be easily spotted in the gulf waters, and 12 playing and feeding in the river.

In 2015, a dolphin named Graze, first sighted in 1992 and since tracked, was found dead. A necropsy conducted by the South Australian Museum found four shotgun pellets in her body. She was not the first dolphin from the pod to have been shot.

Between 2018 and 2019, 11 of the 13 calves born had died, with many of them hit by boats. Four dolphins were killed by boat strikes in 2018. All of the calves born in the summer of 2018-19 died.

In 2019, a dolphin named Star ingested fishing gear and died after having hooks in his mouth for nearly three weeks. The director of AMWRRO, a marine wildlife rescue organisation based in Port Adelaide, said that bureaucratic processes contributed to the death of Star as he was not given authority to use his equipment and expertise in a timely manner.

In October 2020, a male dolphin called Marianna died from blunt force trauma, most likely after collision with a boat. In 2021, a series of deaths and disappearances of dolphins from the sanctuary raised scientific and community concern about the future of the sanctuary's dolphin population. In August, a 12-year-old dolphin called Tallulah, was found dead, and two other dolphins, Doc and Twinkle, appeared to have disappeared. Twinkle had been rescued from entanglement on four prior occasions.

In August 2021, there was a population of around 20, with 10 residing in the estuary and a further 10 coming and going from Gulf St Vincent waters. Dolphins that inhabit or visit the sanctuary face a range of threats, including boat strikes, fishing line entanglement and shark attacks. They also face viruses and pollution, including heavy metals and other substances that bio-accumulate. Calf mortality is also high. Adelaide Dolphin Sanctuary researcher Marianna Boorman reported in August 2021 that the pod had lost 10 young calves and eight adult females in the previous four years. In that time, only three new calves had survived.

In October 2021, another dolphin named Hunter was captured and euthanised after being seen in poor physical condition, and two dolphins named Talulla and Squeak (Hunter's brother) were found dead in the second half of 2021, along with another dolphin near Semaphore Beach. In October 2021, dolphin watcher and advocate Jenni Wyrsta predicted that the pod could be completely extinct by 2026.

There were 23 deaths of calves between 2017 and early 2022.

Some of the names assigned by enthusiasts to the population as of 2022 included Mouse, Crystal, Mel, Bubbles, Hope and Gem, but Gem had not been seen for some time. In March 2022 it was reported that five male abnormally thin male dolphins had been found dead. Numbers in the North Arm and Angas Inlet branches of the river, around Torrens and Garden Islands, had declined most, and those found dead were all animals that never strayed far from home. Necropsies showed that the animals' immune systems had been suppressed, allowing opportunistic bacterial infections to take hold. Experts from University of Adelaide, Flinders University and the South Australian Museum were unable to detect a primary cause for the immunosuppression. Morbillivirus was being investigated as a potential cause, but it did not appear to be a likely candidate. Other possibilities are being investigated, but nothing definitive had been established by April 2022.

Between late 2021 and April 2022, new calves included Saki, alternatively named Frankie (to Dinah); Piki, alternatively named Neon (to Mouse); and Ripple (to Rocket).

== Tail-walking ==
Several of the dolphins of the Port River have been seen to have exhibit "tail-walking", a highly unusual behaviour for a wild dolphin.

This started in 1988 when a female named Billie was rescued after becoming trapped in a polluted marina, and spent two weeks recuperating with captive dolphins. Billie was the same dolphin which had been observed swimming and frolicking with racehorses exercising in the Port River in the 1980s, first named Billy when she had been assumed to be male. After becoming trapped in the Patawalonga at Glenelg, she was rescued and put into placed with several captive dolphins at Marineland, a marine park which had existed at West Beach since 1969, to recuperate. There she observed the captive dolphins performing "tail-walking" – mimicking a standing posture, using her tail to run backwards along the water. To perform this movement, the dolphin "forces the majority of its body vertically out of the water and maintains the position by vigorously pumping its tail".

After being returned to the Port River, she continued to perform this trick, and another dolphin, Wave, copied her. Wave, a very active tail-walker, passed on the skill to her daughters, Ripple and Tallula.

Billie died young, in her mid-20s, in 2009, of kidney failure, and both of Ripple's calves died young. After Billie's death, Wave started tail-walking much more frequently, and other dolphins in the group were observed also performing the behaviour. These included Bianca, Angel, Juliette, and Oriana. In 2011, up to 12 dolphins were observed tail-walking, but only females appeared to learn the skill. In October 2021, a dolphin was observed tail-walking over a number of hours.

Scientists have found the spread of this behaviour, through up to two generations, surprising, as it brings no apparent advantage, and is very energy-consuming. A 2018 study by Mike Rossley et al. suggested:

Social learning is the most likely mechanism for the introduction and spread of this unusual behaviour, which has no known adaptive function. These observations demonstrate the potential strength of the capacity for spontaneous imitation in bottlenose dolphins, and help explain the origin and spread of foraging specializations observed in multiple populations of this genus.

== See also ==
- Protected areas of South Australia
- List of protected areas in Adelaide
