= The Half-Way Girl =

1925 film

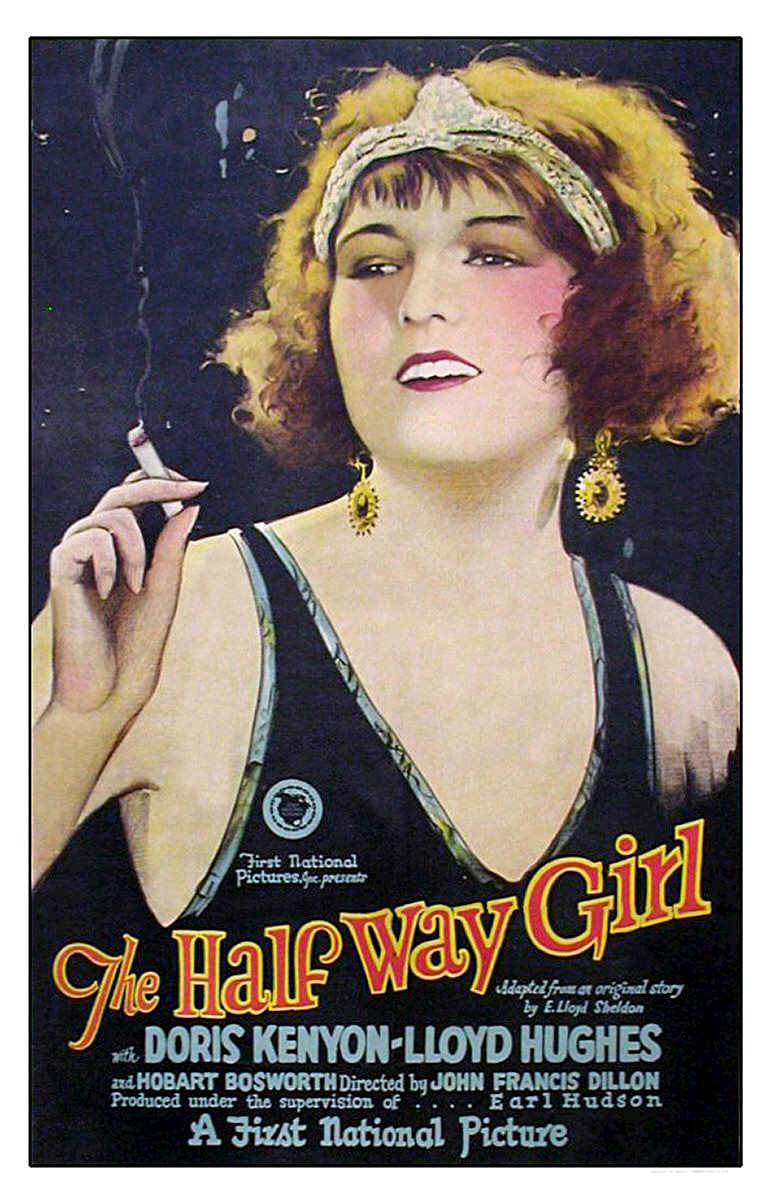
- Lobby poster
- Directed by: John Francis Dillon
- Screenplay by: Joseph F. Poland; Earle Snell
- Story by: E. Lloyd Sheldon
- Produced by: Earl Hudson
- Starring: Doris Kenyon; Lloyd Hughes
- Cinematography: George J. Folsey
- Edited by: Marion Fairfax
- Production company: First National
- Distributed by: First National
- Release date: August 16, 1925
- Running time: 80 minutes
- Country: United States
- Language: Silent (English intertitles)

The Half-Way Girl is a 1925 American silent drama film directed by John Francis Dillon that was filmed around the Jersey Shore.

== Plot ==
As described in a film magazine review, Poppy La Rue is given a job in the hotel as “private hostess” (generally a silent film era euphemism for prostitute) as an alternative to jail when her theatrical troupe from the United States is stranded and cannot pay the hotel bill in Singapore. She becomes interested in Phil Douglas, a nerve shattered war veteran disgusted with life. Douglas kills “The Crab” in an attempted theft of Douglas’ wallet. He is put on board the ship Mandalay by Poppy despite that the highest police official in India has threatened to send her to Malay Street if she continues to interest herself in Douglas. She is rescued from Malay Street, the red-light district, and put on the Mandalay by Jardine, a plantation owner, who is determined to have Poppy. The vessel catches fire and Poppy rescues Douglas from the ship's hold, and he rescues Poppy from Jardine's advances. They manage to get in a lifeboat just before the ship explodes, and they are picked up by another ship. It is learned that the police official, mentioned, is the father of Douglas, who wants the couple to separate, but finally he accepts Poppy as a daughter-in-law. Poppy and Douglas are married.

== Cast ==
- Doris Kenyon as Poppy La Rue
- Lloyd Hughes as Phil Douglas
- Hobart Bosworth as John Guthrie
- Tully Marshall as The Crab
- Sam Hardy as Jardine
- Charles Wellesley as Gibson
- Martha O'Dwyer as Miss Brown (credited as Martha Madison)
- Sally Crute as Effie

== Crew ==
- Directed by: John Francis Dillon
- Cinematography by: George J. Folsey
- Film Editing by: Marion Fairfax
- Art Direction by: Milton Menasco
- Story by: E. Lloyd Sheldon, Joseph F. Poland and Earle Snell

== Production ==
The spectacular fire aboard an ocean liner was shot in color, and to make it even more exciting, a leopard also breaks free on the ship. The Corvallis, a 270-foot Design 1004 ship that was one of the many surplus wooden-hulled cargo ships built by the Emergency Fleet Corporation for World War I, was purchased from the United States Government by First National Pictures for a fraction of her original cost. First National Pictures bought her for the sole purpose of blowing her up in The Half-Way Girl. In June 1925, under the supervision of the United States Coast Guard, the Corvallis, now renamed for the film as the Mandalay, was towed 45 nautical miles (83 km; 52 mi) offshore, loaded with dynamite, and blown up while the cameras rolled. It was claimed that blowing up an actual ship saved $25,000 over the cost of creating the scene using miniatures.

== Preservation ==
With no prints of The Half-Way Girl located in any archives, it is a lost film.
