= Oregon Pine (schooner) =

Ship

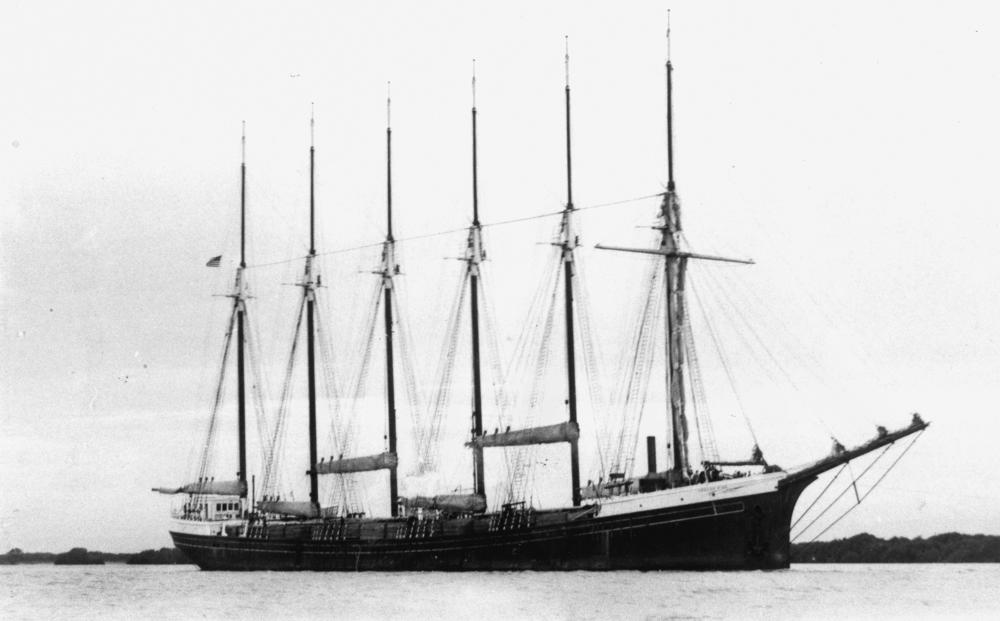
- Oregon Pine

History

United States
- Name: Oregon Pine
- Owner: Grant, Smith, & Co, Portland, Oregon
- Builder: Peninsula Shipbuilding Co., Portland, Oregon
- Acquired: Capt. Sterling, 1926
- Renamed: Contracted as Cotys, renamed Oregon Pine upon completion; renamed Dorothy H. Sterling in 1926
- Fate: Abandoned Garden Island 1932
- Status: Historic shipwreck

General characteristics
- Tons burthen: 2,526 tons; capacity of 2,225,000 ft. of lumber
- Length: 267 ft 0 in (81.38 m)
- Beam: 49 ft 6 in (15.09 m)
- Draft: 25 ft 2 in (7.67 m)
- Propulsion: sail

Oregon Pine was a six-masted lumber schooner completed in 1920, which was built as a result of the shipbuilding efforts associated with World War I. She sailed in the West Coast lumber trade, bringing lumber from the Columbia River to Shanghai and Port Adelaide, Australia.

== Construction ==
Oregon Pine was completed in 1920, as part of a contract by the Emergency Fleet Corporation "for 12 hulls of its own design, 1004 to be delivered without engines. There were no cancellations." Her name was to be Cotys, with a sister ship of Cossa, both six-masted schooners. Upon completion, the schooners were renamed Oregon Pine and Oregon Fir, and later in their careers, Dorothy H. Sterling and Helen B. Sterling, respectively. The schooners were chartered for offshore voyages from the Columbia River with lumber. The two ships were of identical specifications: 2,526 tons, 267 ft. long, with a capacity of 2,225,000 feet of lumber.

== Voyages ==
The Oregon Pine made her last offshore voyage in 1924. She was laid up at Astoria, Oregon, where Capt. Sterling purchased her in 1926, renaming her Dorothy H Sterling Oregon Pine and Oregon Fir were both operating "quite steadily" from the Columbia River in 1926 for the Shanghai Building Co.

== Fate ==
In 1928, the Dorothy H Sterling carried lumber from Puget Sound to Port Adelaide, Australia. There she was "libelled for harbor dues and crew wages." The ship was broken up in Port Adelaide in 1930 and her remains were towed to the Garden Island Ships' graveyard near Port Adelaide on 6 June 1932 where they remain to the present time. The wreck is officially located at 34°48′44.6″S 138°22′23.7″E.

== Gallery ==
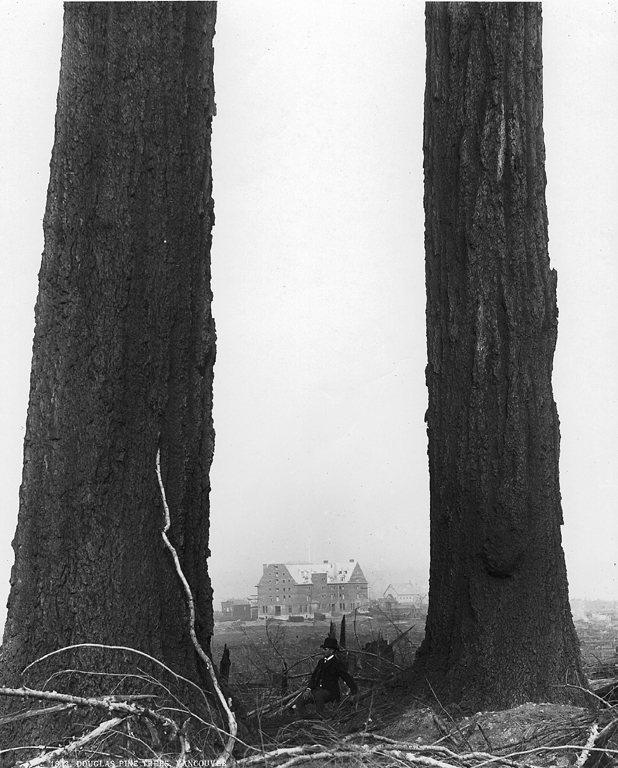
Douglas-fir in Vancouver, British Columbia, 1887

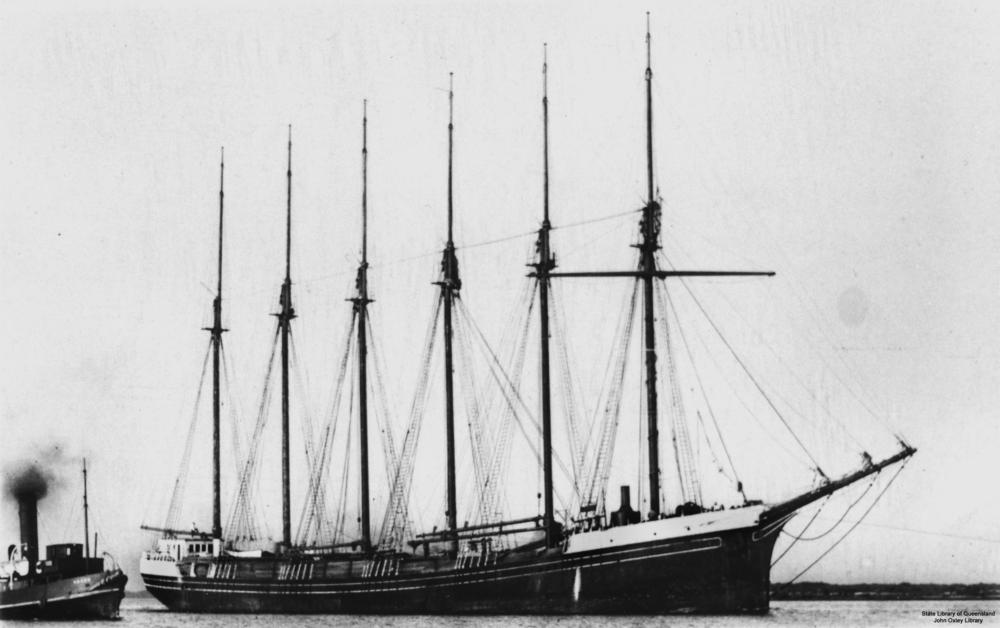
Dorothy H. Sterling

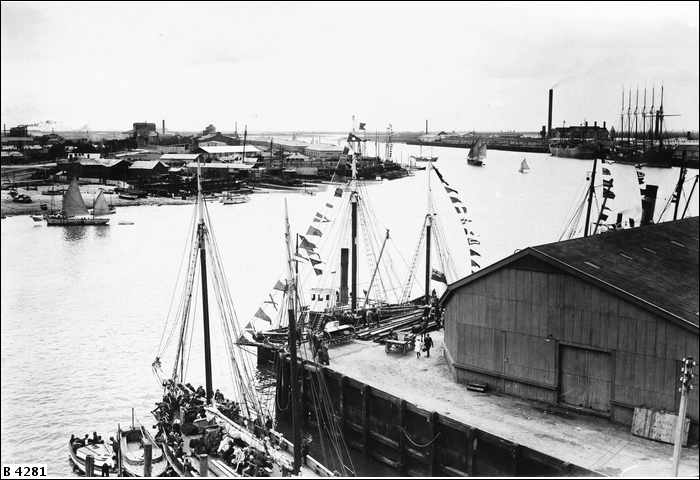
View across the Port River towards McLaren Wharf (circa 1924 to 1927). The six-masted ship on the right is probably the American lumber schooner Dorothy H. Sterling (originally Oregon Pine).

== See also ==
- List of large sailing vessels
