= Garden Island (South Australia) =

Island in South Australia

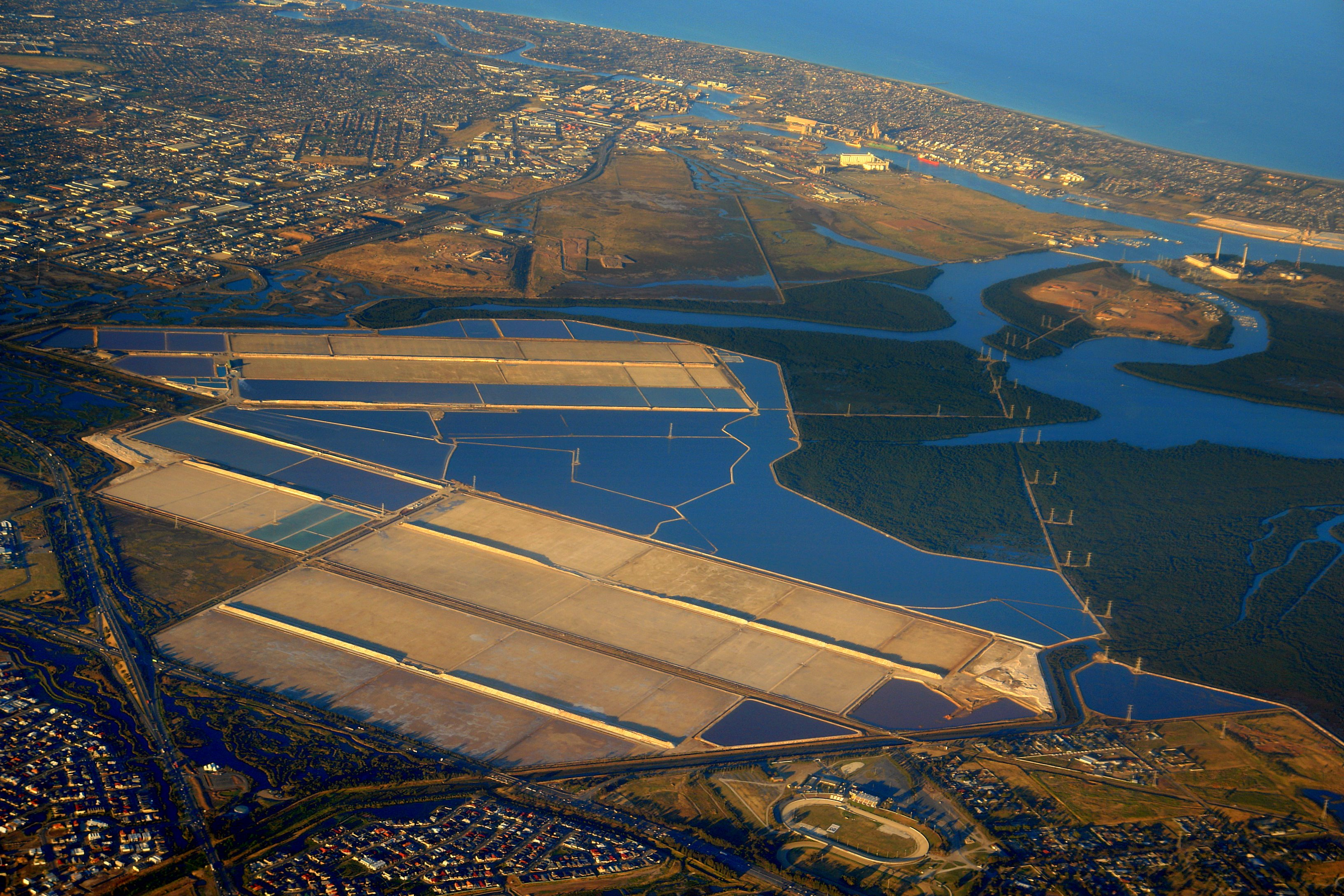
- Aerial view looking WSW of part of the Port River estuary with Garden Island being located in the top right hand corner adjacent to Torrens Island

- Location within Greater Adelaide

Geography
- Location: Gulf St Vincent
- Coordinates: 34°48′26″S 138°32′04″E
- Area: 150 ha (370 acres)

Administration
- Australia

Demographics
- Population: 0

Garden Island is an island in the Australian state of South Australia located about 14 kilometres (8.7 mi) north-west of the capital city of Adelaide in an estuary system within the Adelaide metropolitan area which drains into Gulf St Vincent. It is notable as being a site for a mangrove forest, a landfill, a part of the site for the Multifunction Polis, a ship graveyard and a venue for recreational boating activities. It has enjoyed varying degrees of protected area status since 1973.

== Description ==
Garden Island is located in Gulf St Vincent within the Port River estuary system about 15 kilometres (9.3 mi) north-west of the Adelaide city centre and to the immediate south-east of Torrens Island. It is completely located within the suburb of Garden Island, and lies between the Port River and Barker Inlet. It is surrounded by the following bodies of water: Angas Inlet to the north, Eastern Passage to the east, narrowing to Angas Channel, and North Arm to the south.

Access to the island is via road or via boat. Road access from the mainland is via a bridge while boat ramps are located at three places along the northern coast of the island. All three boat ramps are connected to a road system that runs from the above-mentioned bridge. An electric power transmission line crosses the island in an east-west direction to a termination point at the Torrens Island Power Station.

== Formation, geology and oceanography ==
Garden Island is one of the geographical features in what is now the Adelaide metropolitan area that was formed as a consequence of sea level rise at the start of the Holocene. Sea level rise had three consequences. Firstly, watercourses existing at the time were forced to create new mouths in new coastline. Secondly, currents arising along the new coastline formed beaches, a coastal dune system and ultimately the spit known as the Lefevre Peninsula all by the process of longshore drift. Finally, watercourses such at the River Torrens and the Sturt River were forced to flow north to what is now the Port River estuary after being prevented from draining into Gulf St Vincent by the emerging coastal dune system with result of forming features such as Torrens Island and Garden Island.

== Flora and fauna ==
=== Flora ===
The principal plant species is Avicennia marina (Grey or white mangrove) which has colonized the coastline of Garden Island within the intertidal zone, particularly the island’s east end.

== History ==
=== European use ===
Since 1836, the land tenure has mainly been that of crown land. A third of the island on its western side was dedicated to the South Australian Harbors Board and in 1962, the entire island was dedicated as a reserve under Harbors Board control. The first public road was opened for public use in 1968. The use of the island as a base for recreational boating and as a landfill site began in the 1970s.

==== Landfill site ====
Garden Island was the site of a landfill from about 1972 until 2000. This activity occupied 54 hectares (130 acres) of the island’s 150 hectares (370 acres) and “served the domestic waste disposal needs for almost half of Adelaide.” Landfill gas is managed by an extraction system commissioned in 2015. As of 2014, land filling is still permitted by planning statute on the island in sections 463 and 464 of the cadastral unit of the Hundred of Port Adelaide.

==== Multifunction Polis ====
Garden Island which is located within the Adelaide metropolitan area was proposed as one of the sites for the Multifunction Polis, which was a planned community with a projected population of 250,000 proposed in 1987 and which was abandoned in 1998. As of 2014, land including Garden Island which was intended to be the site of the multifunction polis was still zoned for that purpose.

==== Garden Island Ships' Graveyard ====
The Garden Island Ships' Graveyard has 25 identified wrecks. The remains of the iron and wooden ships that were abandoned between 1909 and 1945 are now bird roosts and a canoeing attraction. The area was also used to house explosives stores from the 1880s. The ships in the ship's graveyard were launched from 1857 to 1920, and include the Flinders, Santiago and Dorothy H. Sterling, as well as other sailing ships, steamships and iron barges.

The ship graveyard is promoted by the Government of South Australia as a canoeing trail.

==== Recreational and tourism uses ====
Since the 1970s, Garden Island has been used as a venue for recreational boating activities associated with adjoining bodies of water such as the Barker Inlet and Port River.

== Protected area status ==
Garden Island has been located within the boundaries of the following protected areas to varying extents since 1973, 2005 and 2014 respectively - the Barker Inlet-St Kilda Aquatic Reserve covers all of the island below high water, the Adelaide Dolphin Sanctuary overlays the entire island, and the Torrens Island Conservation Park includes some land exposed at low water at the east end of the island.

== See also ==
- Garden Island (disambiguation)
- List of islands of Australia
