= Design 1004 ship =

Wood-hulled cargo ship design

Class overview
- Name: EFC Design 1004
- Builders: Peninsula Shipbuilding Company, Portland, Oregon
- Built: 1918–19 (USSB)
- Completed: 12 (2 as schooners)

General characteristics
- Type: Cargo ship
- Tonnage: 4,000 dwt
- Length: 269 ft 0 in (81.99 m)
- Beam: 48 ft 8 in (14.83 m)
- Draft: 27 ft 6 in (8.38 m)
- Propulsion: turbine, single screw, coal fuel

The Design 1004 ship (full name Emergency Fleet Corporation Design 1004) was a wood-hulled cargo ship design approved for production by the United States Shipping Board's Emergency Fleet Corporation (EFC) in World War I. They were referred to as the "Peninsula"-type as all were built by the Peninsula Shipbuilding Company in Portland, Oregon. All ships were completed in 1918 or 1919. Twelve ships were completed. The "Peninsula"-type were the only wooden-hull ships built with a turbine engine which was common on steel ships built at the same time.

Two of the hulls were built as schooners (Cotys completed as Oregon Pine and Cossa completed as Oregon Fir).

One Design 1004 ship, Corvallis, was purchased by First National Pictures and deliberately blown up for the climax of their 1925 silent film The Half-Way Girl (now a lost film).
