= Boonah crisis =

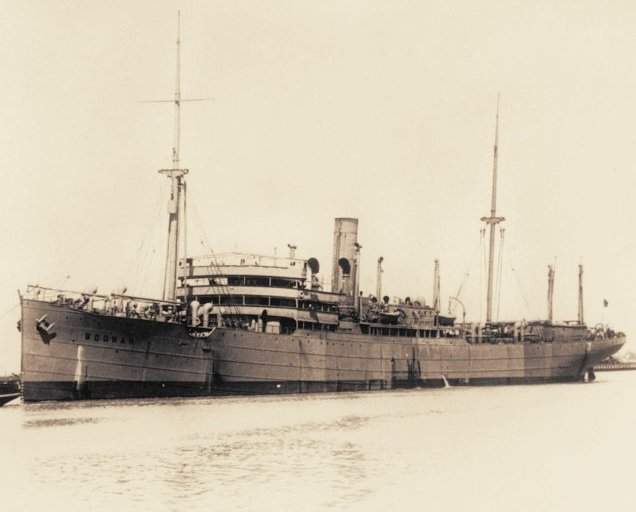
HMAT Boonah was a former German ship, seized following the outbreak of war.

HMAT Boonah was built in Germany in 1912 for the Australian trade, and known as the Melbourne. In Sydney at the outbreak of World War I in 1914, she was seized by the Commonwealth Government, renamed Boonah, and hastily converted to a troopship. In October 1918, near the end of the war, Boonah was the last Australian troop ship to leave Fremantle, Western Australia, bound for the Middle East.

Carrying about 1200 soldiers of the First Australian Imperial Force, she arrived in Durban, South Africa just three days after the armistice was signed and on hearing the news, made arrangements to return home promptly. Before her departure however, local stevedores from the Spanish flu stricken city were used to load and unload supplies from the ship and in the course of doing so infected soldiers who were billeted in crowded conditions throughout the ship.

== Return ==
Another troop ship, the Wyreema had departed South Africa ahead of the Boonah and remained in radio contact throughout the eastward return journey across the Indian Ocean. The Wyreema's troop commanding officer, P.M. McFarlane wrote "the troopship Boonah was two days behind us and we picked up her wireless messages nightly, detailing the daily increasing number of men suffering from pneumonia influenza. The Western Australian Commandant asked me to land twenty nursing sisters at the Quarantine Station. Volunteers were called for and there was not only a ready response but so many offered that it was necessary to place the names in a hat and draw the twenty required. They knew perfectly well the enormous risk they were taking. Yet they were eager to undertake the work and those whose names were not drawn were disappointed."

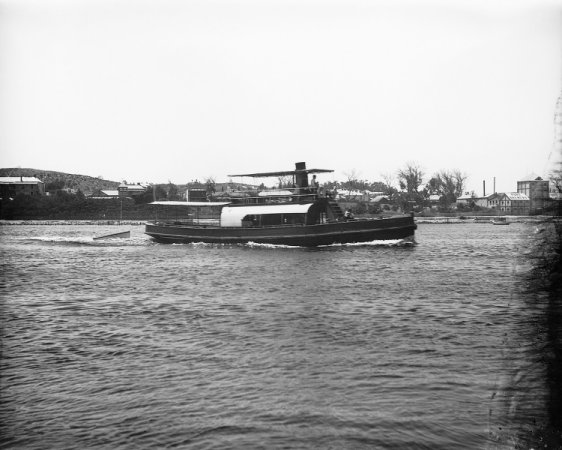
Fremantle Harbour Trust vessel Reliance, used to ferry the sick soldiers to Woodman Point

By the time the ship had arrived back at Fremantle on 12 December, more than 300 cases had been reported. Commonwealth immigration authorities initially refused to allow the soldiers to disembark, knowing of the global pandemic which was raging, but which had spared Western Australia until then. After some delay in gaining approval, the ship anchored in Gage Roads, and 300 of the most unwell soldiers were ferried ashore to the Quarantine Station at Woodman Point, south of Fremantle. Three men died at the station on the first day. The condition of some deteriorated further, with more dying, as well as more than 20 nursing and medical staff becoming infected.

Cases of reported influenza on HMAT Boonah, 1918

Meanwhile, on board ship where most of the men remained, conditions were said to be deplorable. To prove that the disease had burnt itself out, a seven-day incubation period with no new cases was required, but new infections and deaths continued, caused by the cramped and close living conditions. With casualties growing each day, public outrage grew against the refusal of the immigration authorities to allow all of the soldiers ashore. "How many cases of sickness and death are required to make the authorities do a commonsense thing?" (The Daily News, 14 December 1918). "Enough of this inhuman incarceration of soldiers in the disease-stricken cubby-hole of a floating hell." (The Sunday Times editorial, 15 December 1918).

Wrangling continued between the State Minister for Health, Sir Hal Colebatch, and the federal immigration authorities, and tensions increased to the point that the returned servicemen's association made threats to storm the ship to take the sick men to shore. After nine days of acrimony, the ship was ordered to depart, despite breaking quarantine regulations, presumably to defuse the situation. Another 17 cases were discovered between Albany and Adelaide and the remaining men were disembarked at Torrens Island Quarantine Station, just north of Adelaide, a similar facility to Woodman Point. No further deaths occurred and after being given the all-clear, the remaining men returned to their homes.

A total of twenty-seven soldiers, and four nurses at Woodman Point, died of influenza during the crisis.
