= Torrens Island Conservation Park =

Protected area in South Australia

- IUCN category III (natural monument or feature)
- Location within South Australia
- Location: South Australia
- Nearest city: Port Adelaide
- Coordinates: 34°47′4″S 138°31′46″E
- Area: 6.35 km^{2} (2.45 sq mi)
- Established: 28 November 1963
- Governing body: Department for Environment and Water

Torrens Island Conservation Park (formerly Torrens Island National Park Reserve and Torrens Island Wild-life Reserve) is a protected area in the Australian state of South Australia located on Torrens Island in the Adelaide metropolitan area about 17 kilometres (11 miles) north-northwest of the state capital of Adelaide and about 3.9 kilometres (2.4 miles) north-northeast of Port Adelaide.

The conservation park consists of land in Allotments 300 and 304 in Deposited Plan 90964, and sections 464 and 467 in the cadastral unit of the Hundred of Port Adelaide. This consists of all of Torrens Island down to low water with exception to the most of land associated with the former quarantine station and the land associated with the Quarantine and Torrens Island Power Stations, and some land exposed at low water at the eastern end of Garden Island.

On 28 November 1963, land in section 467 was proclaimed as a "wild-life reserve" under the National Park and Wild Life Reserves Act 1891. On 9 November 1967, it was proclaimed as the Torrens Island National Park Reserve under the National Parks Act 1966 in respect to section 467 in the Hundred of Port Adelaide. On 27 April 1972, it was reconstituted as Torrens Island Conservation Park upon the proclamation of the National Parks and Wildlife Act 1972. On 23 January 2014, the following land in the Hundred of Port Adelaide was added to the conservation park all subject to the preservation of rights under the Petroleum and Geothermal Energy Act 2000 for the "construction or operation of a transmission pipeline" - Allotments 300 and 304 in Deposited Plan 90964, and Section 464. As of 2016, it covered an area of 6.35 square kilometres (2.45 sq mi).

In 1980, the conservation park was described as follows:

Situated at the northern end of Torrens Island, which lies near the mouth of the Port River, this park preserves a salt marsh land system. The vegetation comprises a low woodland of Avicennia marina var. resinifera (white mangrove) and low-shrubland of Salicornia spp. and allied genera. Over thirty species of salt tolerant plants have been recorded for the park. The marshes breed a myriad of worms, shrimps and simple organisms on which fish feed, helping to stock the Port River for fishing and providing food for over forty species of birds. The latter include a number of rare or uncommon summer visiting waders, ie. Tringa terek (terek sandpiper), Limosa lapponica (bar-tailed godwit), Numenius minutus (whimbrel) and Pluvialis dominica (lesser golden plover) ... The park is relatively undisturbed, although rabbits, which cross from the mainlands at low tide, are very common on the Island.

In 2014, it was reported as protecting "areas of mangrove forest, samphire shrubland and sand dune systems home to vulnerable and threatened species such as the Australasian bittern, the fairy tern and the white-bellied sea eagle".

The conservation park is also respectively fully and partially within the boundaries of the following protected areas - the Adelaide Dolphin Sanctuary and the Barker Inlet-St Kilda Aquatic Reserve.

The conservation park is classified as an IUCN Category III protected area. In 1980, it was listed on the now-defunct Register of the National Estate.

== See also ==
- List of protected areas in Adelaide
- Adelaide International Bird Sanctuary
- Gulf St Vincent Important Bird Area
