= Ship graveyard =

Location where scrapped ships are left

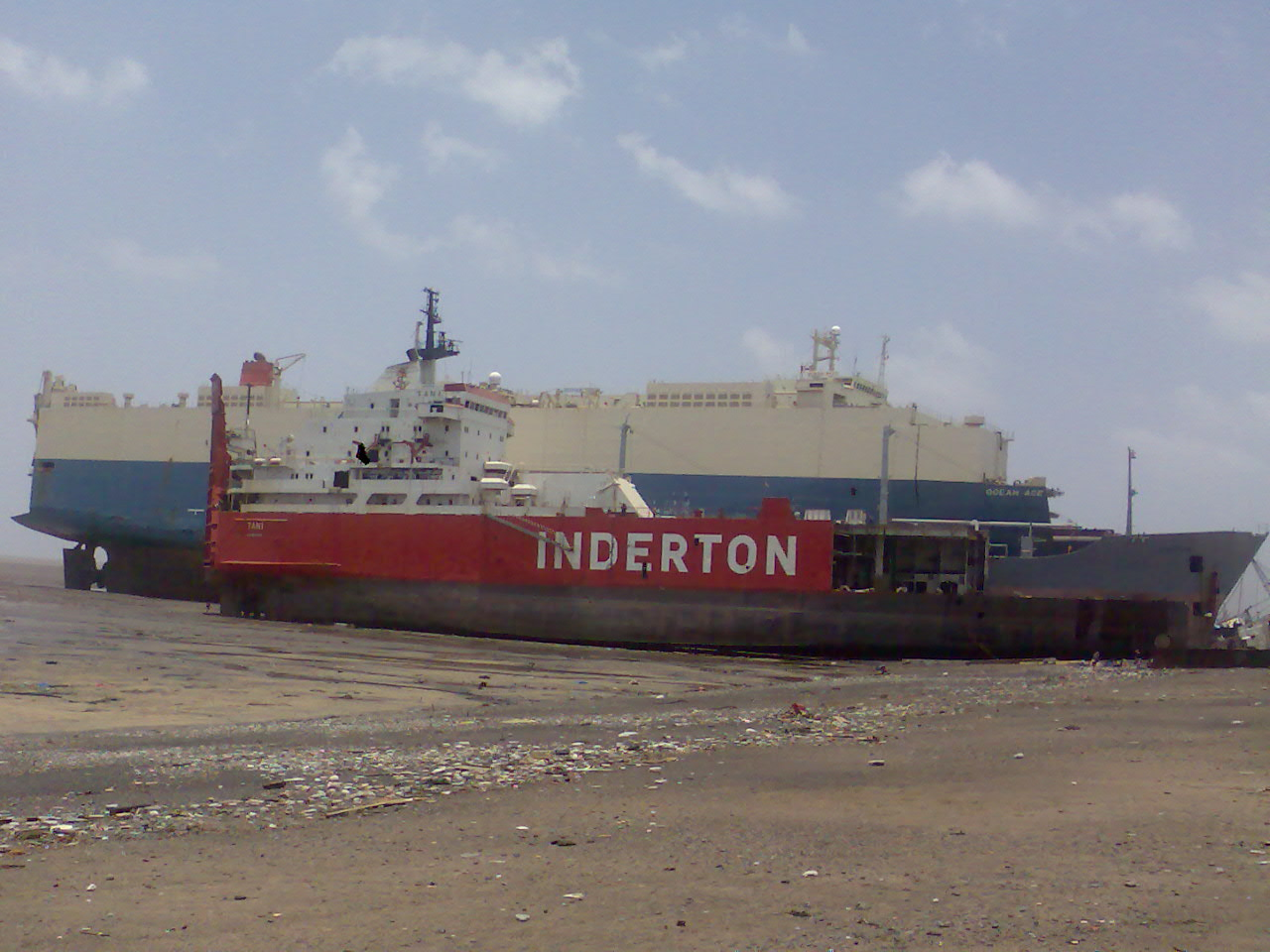
Large ships are scrapped in Alang, India

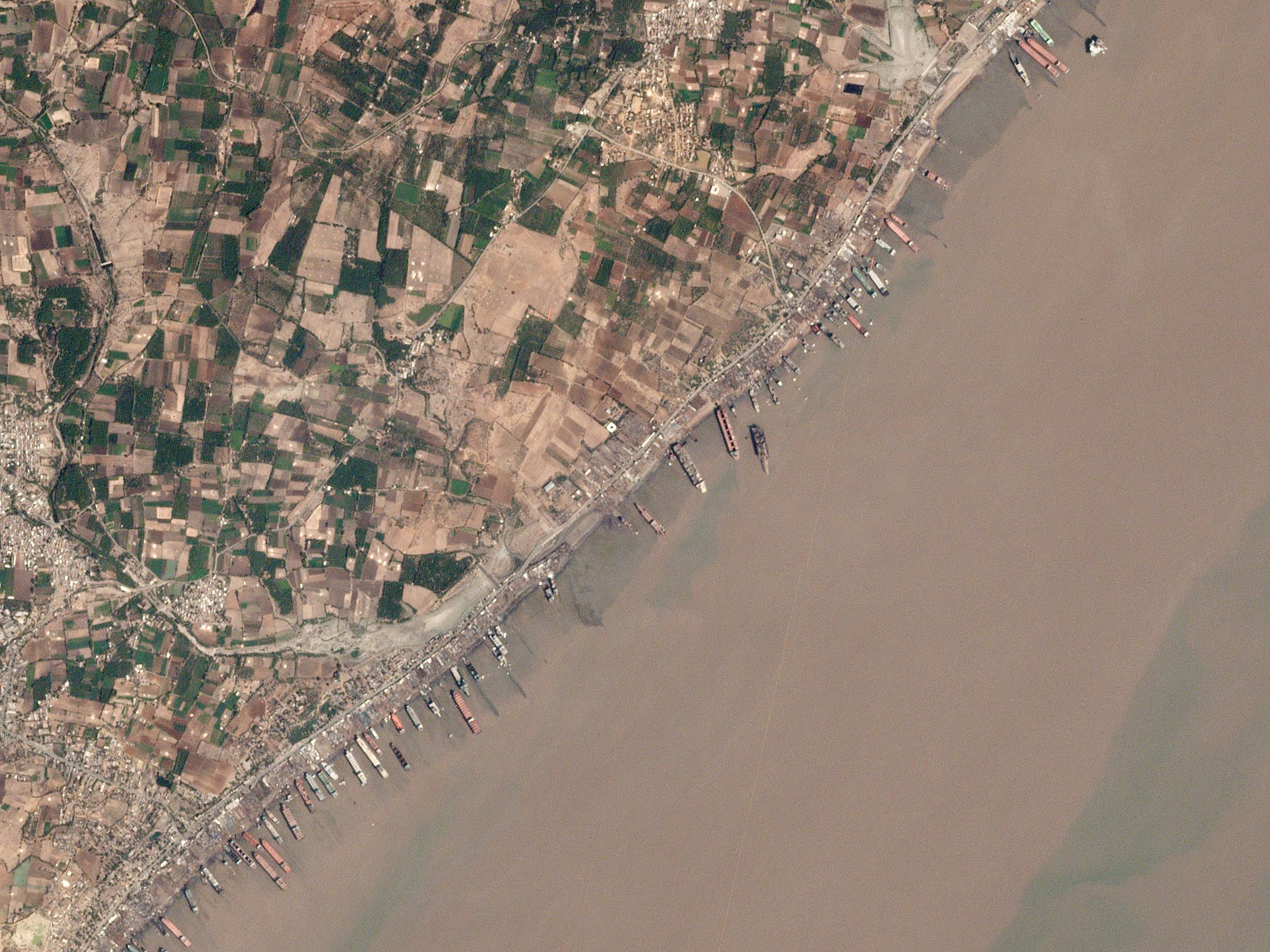
Aerial view of Alang

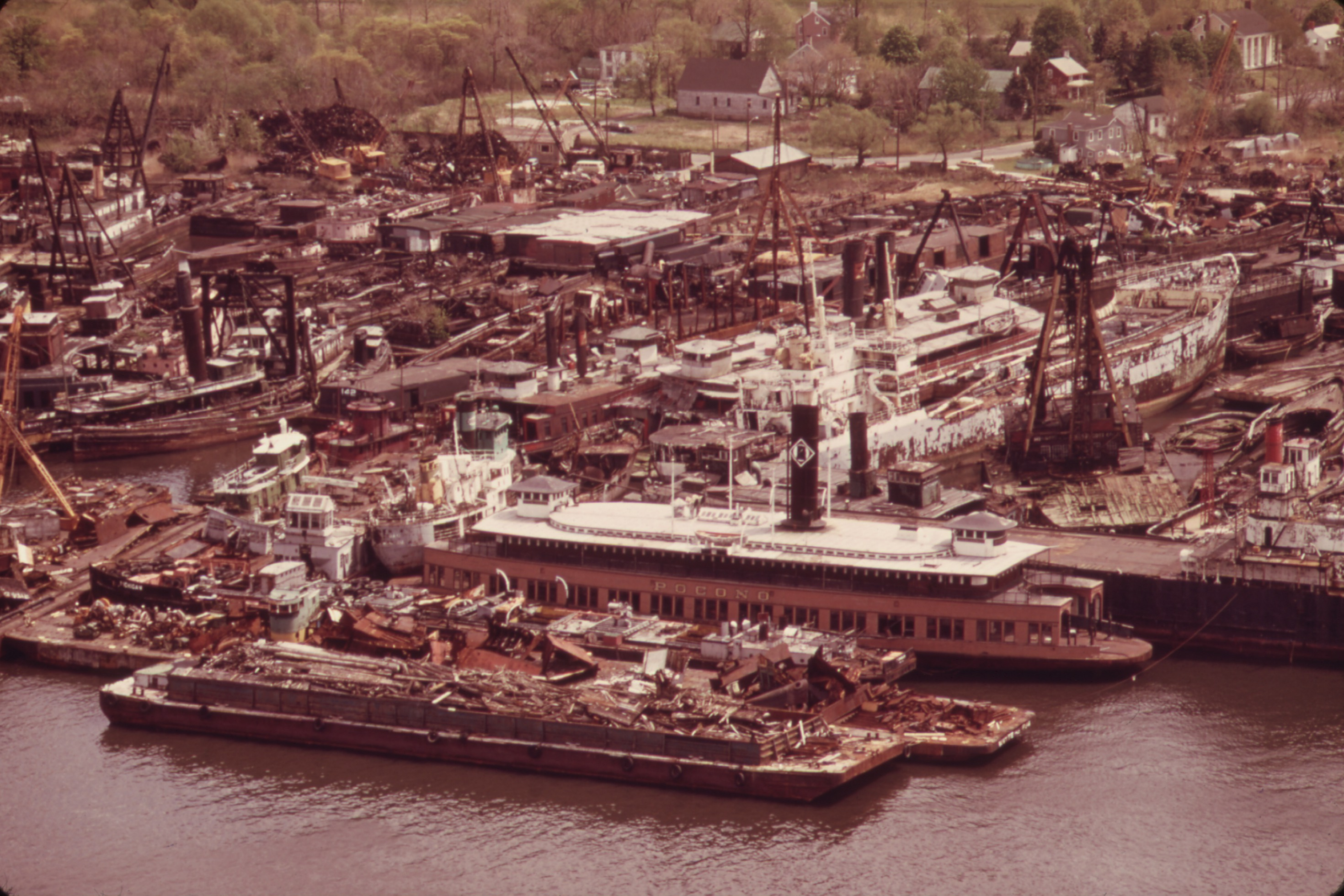
Staten Island boat graveyard in 1973

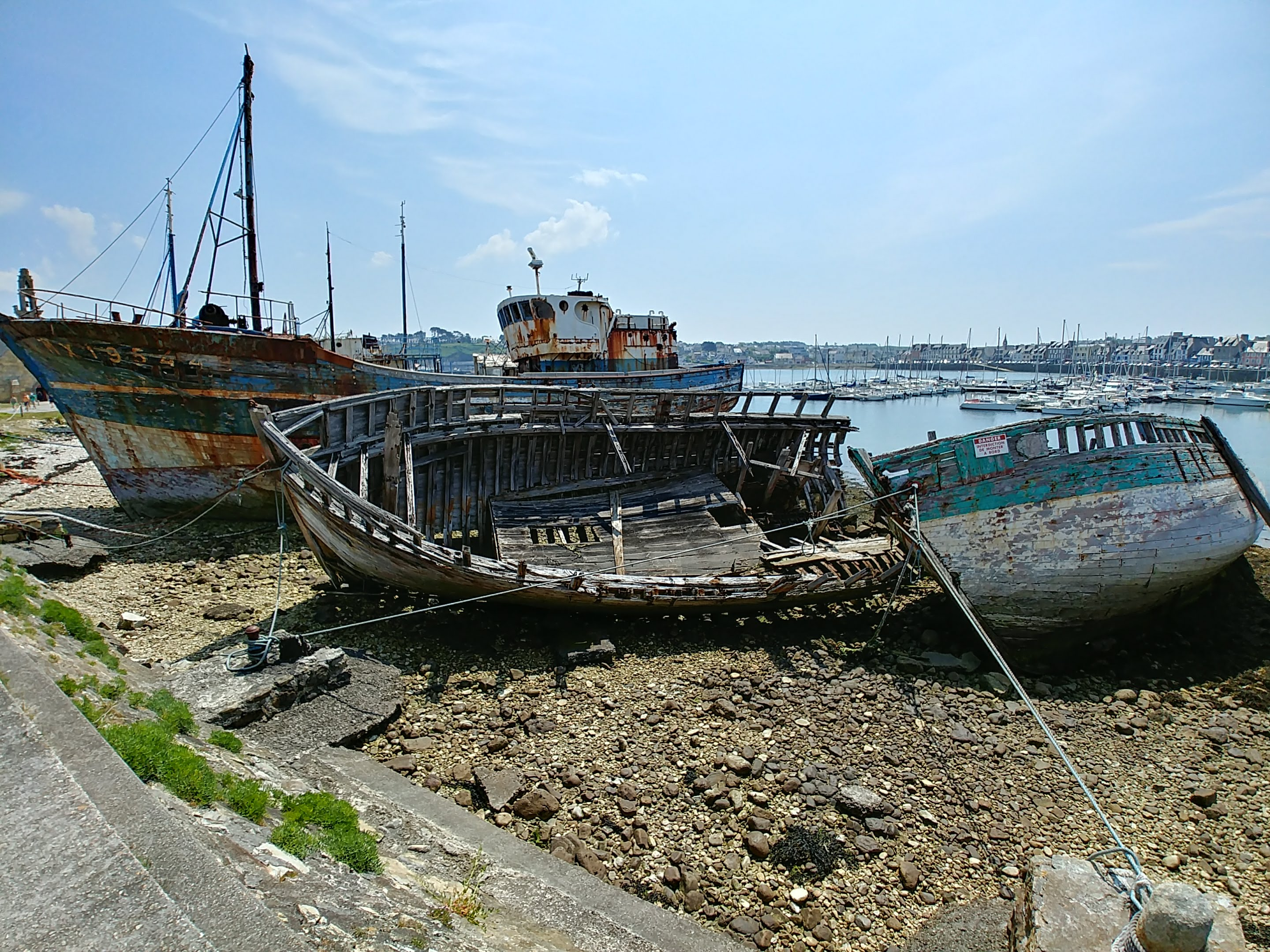
Shipwrecks in Camaret-sur-Mer

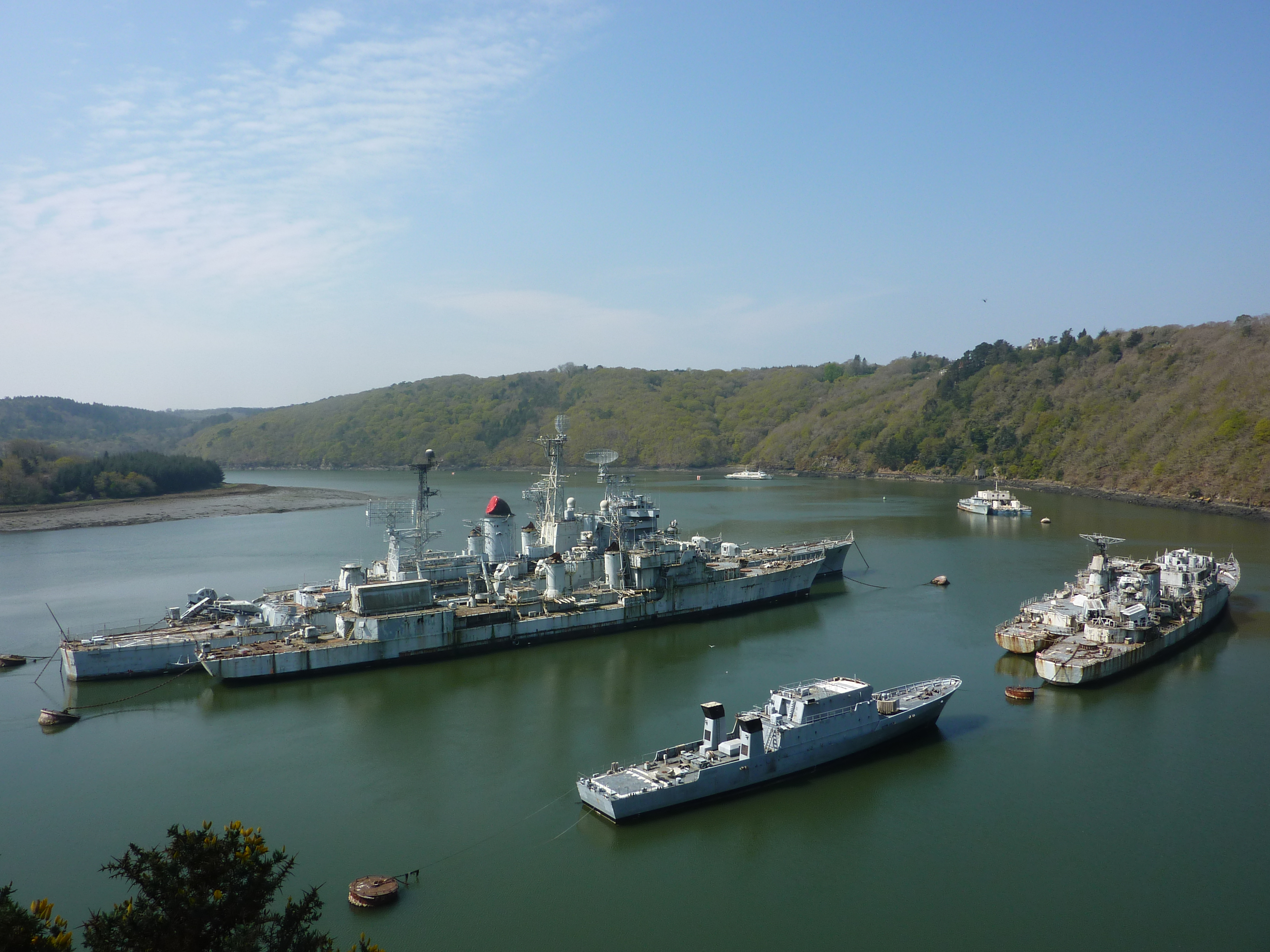
French navy graveyard at Landévennec near Brest

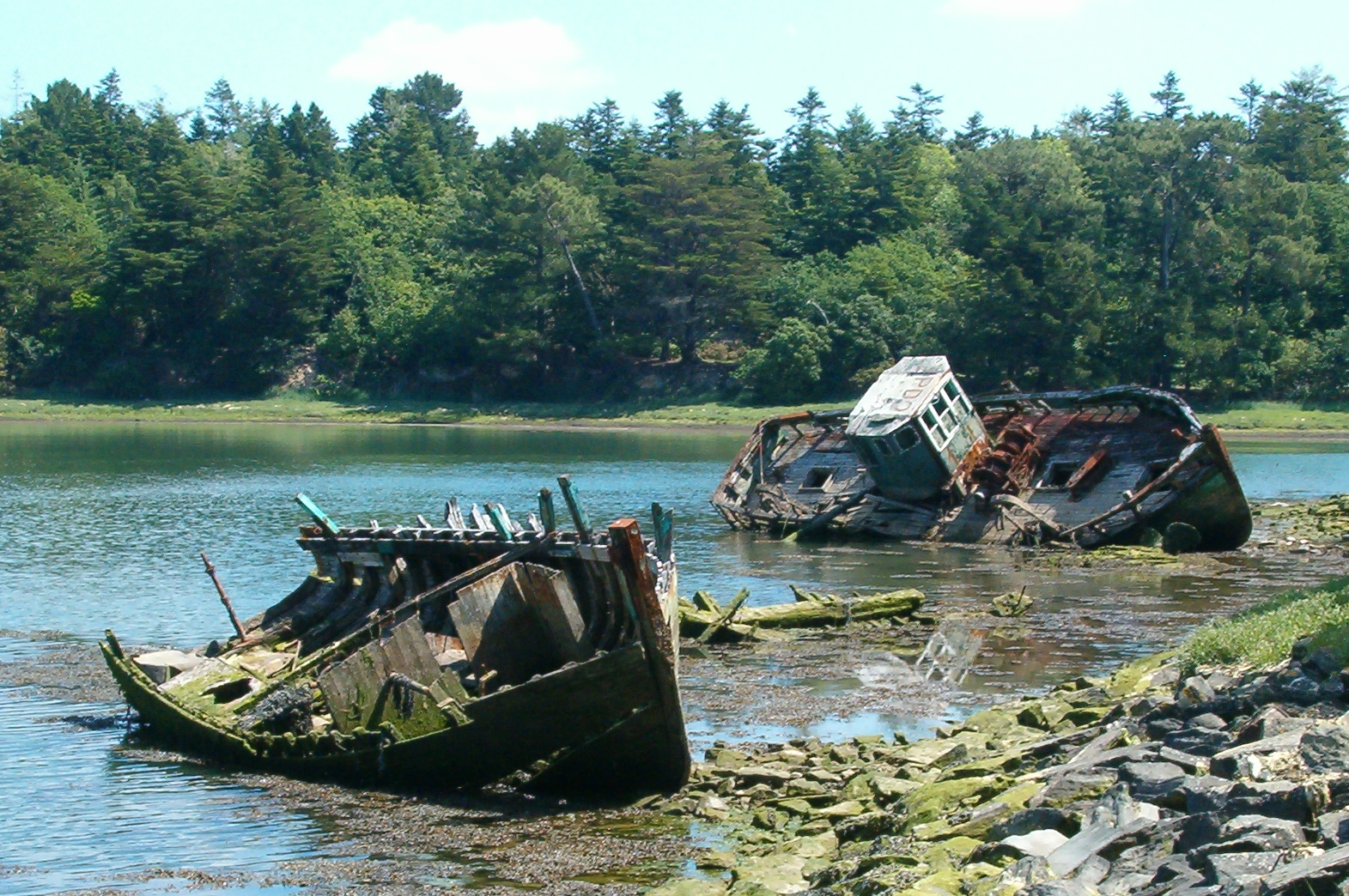
Boat cemetery in Bénodet

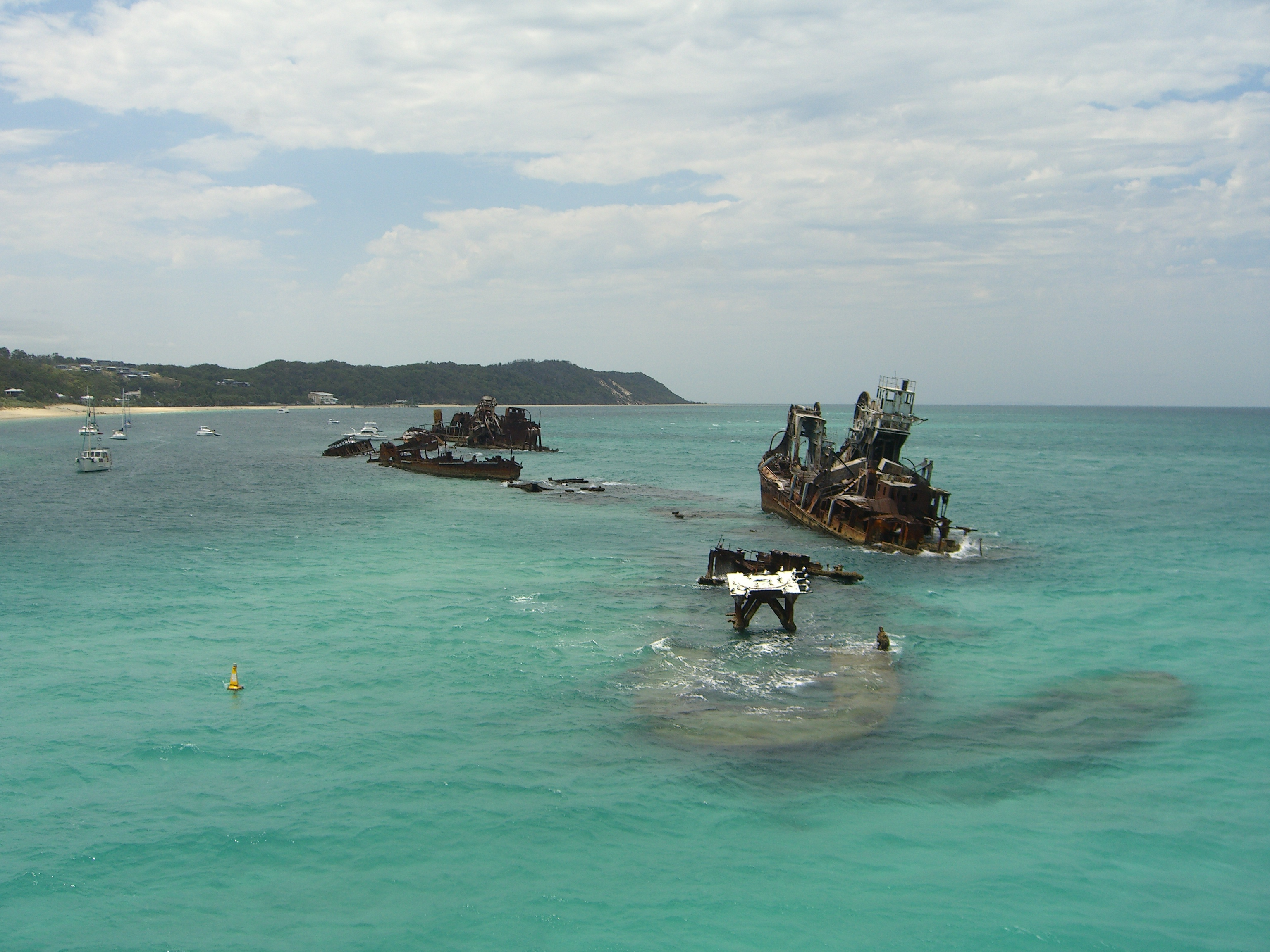
Tangalooma Wrecks near Moreton Island, Queensland, Australia

A ship graveyard, ship cemetery or breaking yard is a location where the hulls of scrapped ships are left to decay and disintegrate, or left in reserve. Such a practice is now less common due to waste regulations and so some dry docks where ships are broken (to recycle their metal and remove dangerous materials like asbestos) are also known as ship graveyards.

By analogy, the phrase can also refer to an area with many shipwrecks which have not been removed by human agency, instead being left to disintegrate naturally. These can form in places where navigation is difficult or dangerous (such as the Seven Stones off Cornwall, or Blackpool on the Irish Sea), or where many ships have been deliberately scuttled together (as with the German High Seas Fleet at Scapa Flow), or where many ships have been sunk in battle (such as Ironbottom Sound, in the Pacific). Such regions are also likely to be described as shipwreck graveyards.

The majority of the ships in the world are constructed in the developed countries. Ships last about 25–30 years, after which they become too expensive to maintain and are sold to be broken down. Most of them are directly sold to the ship recycling companies in India, Bangladesh, Pakistan and other developing countries, also known as the (semi-)periphery countries from Immanuel Wallerstein's World System Theory. In 2014, 54% of the ships went to the beaches of India and Bangladesh. This is consistent with the period 2012–2018. From the total of 6,702 scrapped ships worldwide, 3,586 ships have been scrapped in India and Bangladesh, which comes down to 53.5 percent.

As of January 2020, India has the highest global revenue and highest share of global ship breaking (number and volume of ships broken), with a 30% share.

It is estimated that ship breaking yards provide more than 100,000 jobs to people worldwide and that they yield millions of tons of steel every year with a minimal consumption of electricity. Besides steel, this industry also yields a huge amount of solid waste in the form of scrapped wood, plastic, insulation material, glass wool, sponge, waste paper, oiled rope and cotton waste.

== List of ship graveyards ==
=== Africa ===
- Wrecks all along the peninsular coast at Nouadhibou, in Mauritania
- Many wrecks along the Skeleton Coast in Namibia

=== Asia ===
- Several locations near the Aral Sea
- The ship-breaking yards of Alang (India), Chittagong (Bangladesh), and Gadani (Pakistan)

=== Europe ===
==== France ====
- Guilvinec-Lechiagat
- On the river Rance
- Magouër (Plouhinec, Morbihan)
- Plouhinec, Finistère
- Landévennec

==== Sweden ====
- Ship cemetery at Ekenabben in Blekinge.

==== United Kingdom ====
- The River Tamar downstream of the Royal Albert Bridge used to be used as a mooring site for mothballed vessels, including submarines, of the Royal Navy. These have now all been removed.
- Portsmouth Harbour hosts a number of ex Royal Navy vessels, awaiting removal for scrapping.
- Forton Lake in Gosport, near Portsmouth, is host to approximately thirty vessels, several of which saw action in World War II.
- Scapa Flow, where in 1919 German sailors sank their own fleet while interned. Most of the ships were excavated in the following years, but there are still 8 wrecks from this event and several others.

=== North America ===
==== Canada ====
- Burrard Inlet McBarge

==== United States ====
- The US Navy "phantom fleet" at Suisun Bay, to the north of San Francisco Bay
- The US Army Patuxent River "ghost fleet" of 1927–40, comprising the USAT Monticello (ex-USS Agamemnon, ex-German SS Kaiser Wilhelm II of 1903), America (ex-German SS Amerika of 1905), Mount Vernon (ex-German Kronprinzessin Cecile of 1907) and George Washington (ex-German SS George Washington of 1909)
- Witte's Marine Salvage - the Staten Island boat graveyard.
- Bikini Atoll was designated as a ship graveyard for the U.S. Pacific fleet; it later became known as a nuclear testing facility.
- Mallows Bay, Maryland.
- Green Jacket Shoal, Rhode Island

=== Oceania ===
==== Australia ====
New South Wales:

- Stockton Breakwater (Newcastle)
- Homebush Bay Ships' Graveyard (Sydney)
- Pindimar Bay Ships' Graveyard/The Duckhole (Myall Lakes)

Northern Territory:

- Darwin Harbour East Arm

Queensland:

- Bishop Island Ships' Graveyard (Brisbane)
- Tangalooma Wrecks (Moreton Island)
- The Bulwer Wrecks (Moreton Island)
- Curtin Artificial Reef

South Australia: As of November 2020 there are 19 ships' graveyards in South Australia.

- Near Port Adelaide, in the Port River and environs:
  - Angas Inlet
  - Broad Creek
  - Mutton Cove
  - Jervois Basin
  - Garden Island

Others

- Ardrossan (the No 5 dumb hopper barge)
- Cowell
- Glenelg
- Goat Island
- Kangaroo Island
- Port Augusta
- Port Flinders
- Port Lincoln
- Port Noarlunga
- Port Pirie
- Port Stanvac
- Stenhouse Bay
- Whyalla
- Yankalilla Bay (HMAS Hobart)

Tasmania:

- Little Betsey Island Ships' Graveyard (Hobart)
- East Risdon Ships' Graveyard (Hobart)
- Strahan Ships' Graveyard (Strahan)
- Tamar Island Ships' Graveyard (Launceston)

Victoria:

- Barwon Heads Ships' Graveyard (Port Phillip Bay)

Western Australia:

- Careening Bay Ships' Graveyard
- Rottnest Island Ships' Graveyard (off Rottnest Island)
- Jervoise Bay Ships' Graveyard
- Albany Ships' Graveyard (Albany)

== See also ==
- Aircraft boneyard
- Ghost ship
- Derelict (maritime)
- Marine debris
- Marine pollution
- Shipbreaking
- Train graveyard
