= Quarantine Power Station =

Gas-fired power station in South Australia, Australia

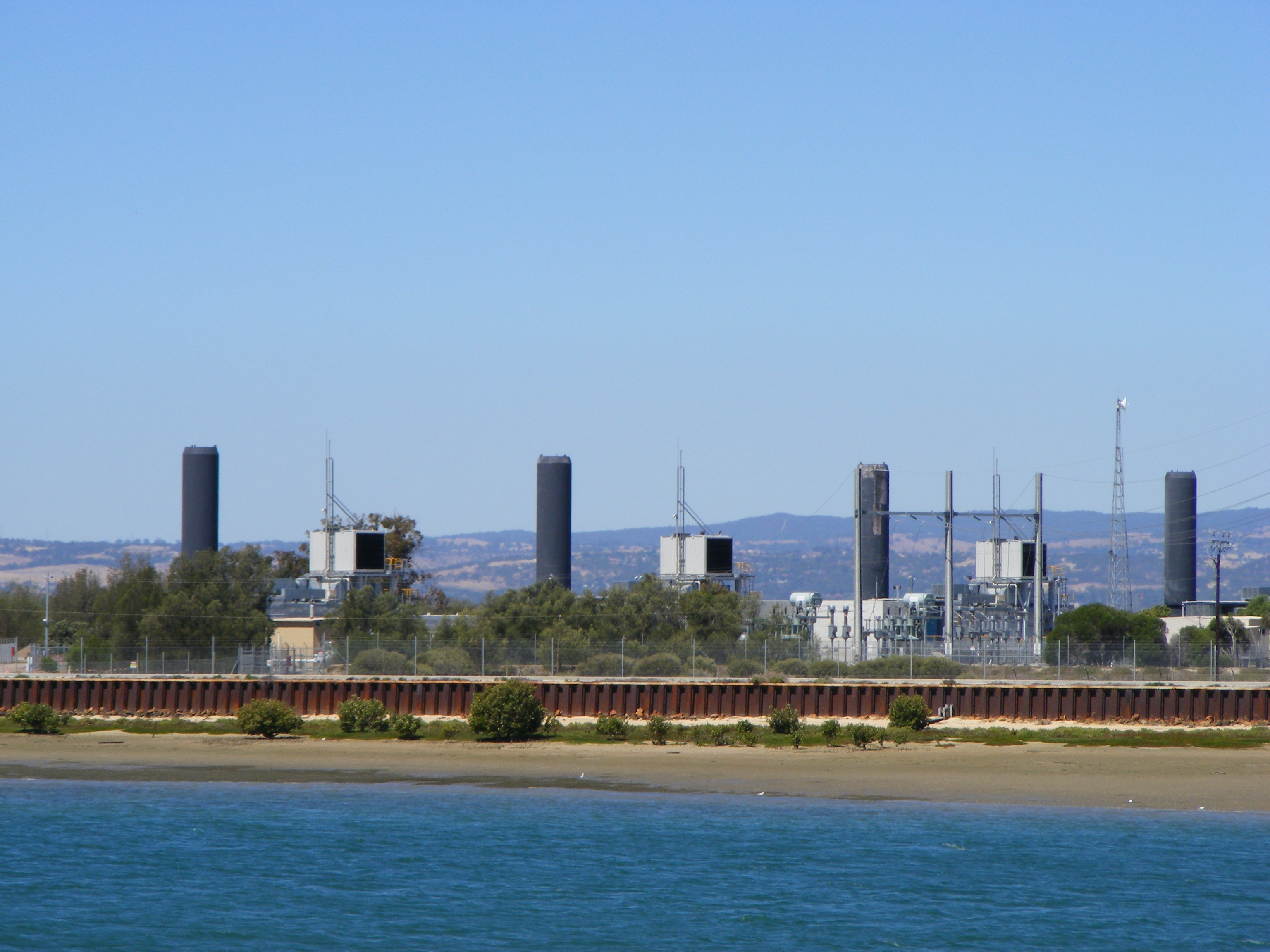
- Country: Australia
- Location: Torrens Island, South Australia
- Coordinates: 34.779°S 138.522°E
- Status: Operational
- Commission date: 2002 (stage 1); 2009 (stage 2)
- Owner: Origin Energy
- Operator: Origin Energy

Thermal power station
- Primary fuel: Natural gas
- Turbine technology: open cycle gas turbine

Power generation
- Make and model: General Electric Frame 9E
- Nameplate capacity: 224 MW

Quarantine Power Station is a gas-powered electricity generation facility near the northern end of Torrens Island in the northwestern suburbs of Adelaide, South Australia. It is at the opposite end of Torrens Island from AGL Energy's Torrens Island and Barker Inlet power stations. It gets its name from the Torrens Island Quarantine Station which was nearby.

The power station is owned by Origin Energy and is configured as a peaking power plant. It has a capacity of 224 MW produced by open cycle gas turbines. It was initially installed in 2002 with four Alstom GT10B (now designated Siemens SGT600 after Siemens bought the Alstom Medium-sized GT business) turbines generating 95 MW of power. It was expanded in 2007 by the addition of a new 120 MW General Electric Frame 9E gas turbine set. The power station is fuelled by natural gas, delivered by the EPIC energy & SEAGas pipeline.
