= Sticky Torrens =

Former British racing driver and greyhound trainer (born 1949)

Nevin 'Sticky' Torrens
- Born: Nevin Torrens; 1949 (age 76–77); Ballymoney, Northern Ireland
- Occupations: Racing driver, dog trainee
- Height: 6'4”

Nevin or Neville "Sticky" Torrens (born May 1949) is a former British racing driver and greyhound trainer, who was known as a "king" of hot rod racing in Northern Ireland.

== Biography ==
Born in 1949, in Ballymoney, Torrens transitioned into hot rod racing after a short stint in Superstox. He initially raced mk1 and mk2 Ford Escorts, but later switched to a Hillman Avenger, a car he had previously rallied. From 1978 to 1981, Torrens raced a non-hybrid Talbot Sunbeam. After several seasons with the Talbot, he moved on to build and race a Toyota Starlet, choosing to use a Toyota engine rather than creating a hybrid with a Ford engine.

Torrens won the Hot Rod Irish Open Championship at Aghadowey in 1976. Even when not the winner, he provided much excitement in races, as described by one sports writer: "James Burns may have won the hot rod final on Saturday night, at Shamrock Park, Portadown, though the men who stole the glory in the race, however, were Ormond Christie and Sticky Torrens. They literally raced bumper to bumper for two thirds of the race. Torrens was in front, Christie overtook him held the lead, lost it again when Stickey [sic] surged ahead. Ormond came back and got through on the inside and held his slender lead to the finish. A superb battle all the way."

In 1976, Torrens became one of the first drivers to represent Northern Ireland in the National and British Championship meetings, racing at Hednesford and Arlington, as well as competing at Cowdenbeath in Scotland. In 1981, he became the first Irish hot rod racer to receive sponsorship from a car manufacturer, Talbot Motor Co.

Torrens' competition number changed during his career, starting as 411, which appeared on his mk1 Escort. In 1977, after the Irish promoters decided to switch to two-digit race numbers, Torrens adopted the number 88. In 1979, when a national hot rod numbering system was introduced, Northern Irish drivers were assigned numbers between 900 and 999, with Torrens taking the number 988. Torrens also changed his racing livery, beginning with a white and orange design and changing to a zebra-stripe pattern.

Torrens attended Coleraine Academical Institution. He worked as a hairdresser, and had a salon called 'Stickys Snip Joint' in Ballymena, County Antrim. He also played trombone, and was a member of bands including the Walter Lewis Band in Belfast, and the Groundhogs in Dublin. He also worked venues for Van Morrison, Kris Kristofferson and The Cranberries.

Torrens also trained greyhounds for racing, and had many winners at the Brandywell race track in the 2010s, including a bitch named 'Rockets Return'.

== Major Titles Won ==
- 1975 Hot Rod Irish Championship
- 1976 Hot Rod Irish Open Championship
- 1976 Hot Rod Irish Championship
