= Torrens Act =

Torrens Act or Torrens ACT may refer to:

- Torrens title
- Torrens, Australian Capital Territory
- The Artizans and Labourers Dwellings Act 1868 (31 & 32 Vict. c. 130) in the UK, known as Torrens' Act
