= Torrens Island =

Island in South Australia

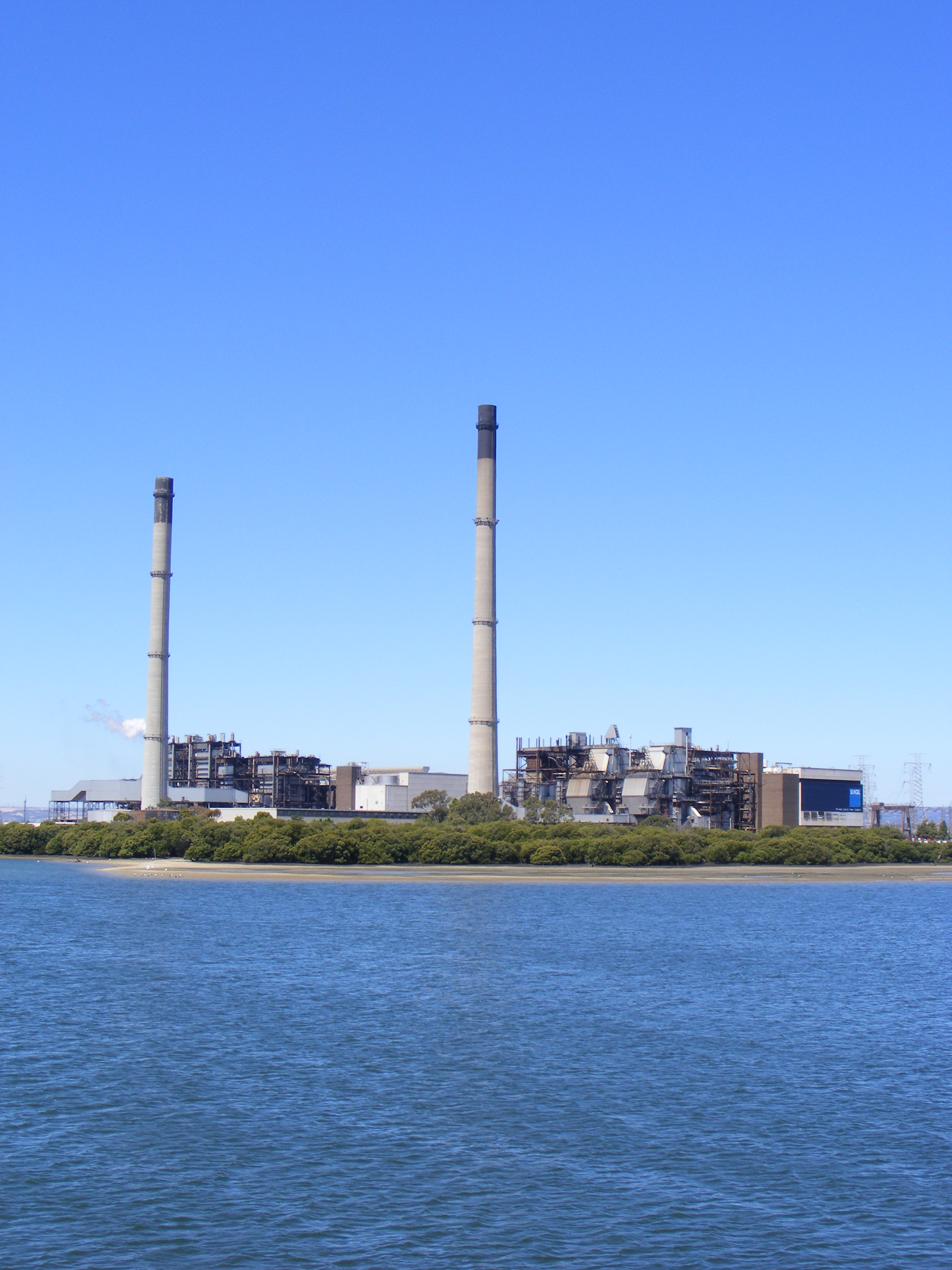
- Torrens Island Power Station

- Location within Greater Adelaide

Geography
- Location: Adelaide
- Coordinates: 34°47′36″S 138°31′45″E
- Area: 7.69 km^{2} (2.97 sq mi)

Administration
- Australia
- South Australia

Torrens Island is an island (and eponymous locality) in the Australian state of South Australia located in the Adelaide metropolitan area in the Port River Estuary about 15 kilometres (9.3 mi) northwest of the Adelaide city centre. Since European settlement of Adelaide in 1836, it has been used for a number of purposes.

== Geographical features ==
An island in the Port River Estuary between the Port River to the west and Barker Inlet to the east, Torrens Island is located about 15 kilometres (9.3 mi) north-west of Adelaide. Light Passage, named after founder of Adelaide Colonel William Light, lies in the Port River between Pelican Point and Torrens Island. Torrens Island is separated from the smaller Garden Island to the south by the Angas Inlet, but is connected to the mainland by a causeway and a bridge over the North Arm.

== History ==
=== European discovery and use ===
According to the Australian Dictionary of Biography, Governor George Gawler in 1837 named the site after Robert Torrens senior, who was chairman of the South Australian Colonisation Commission, the board responsible for setting up and running the colony in its early years.

==== Quarantine Station ====
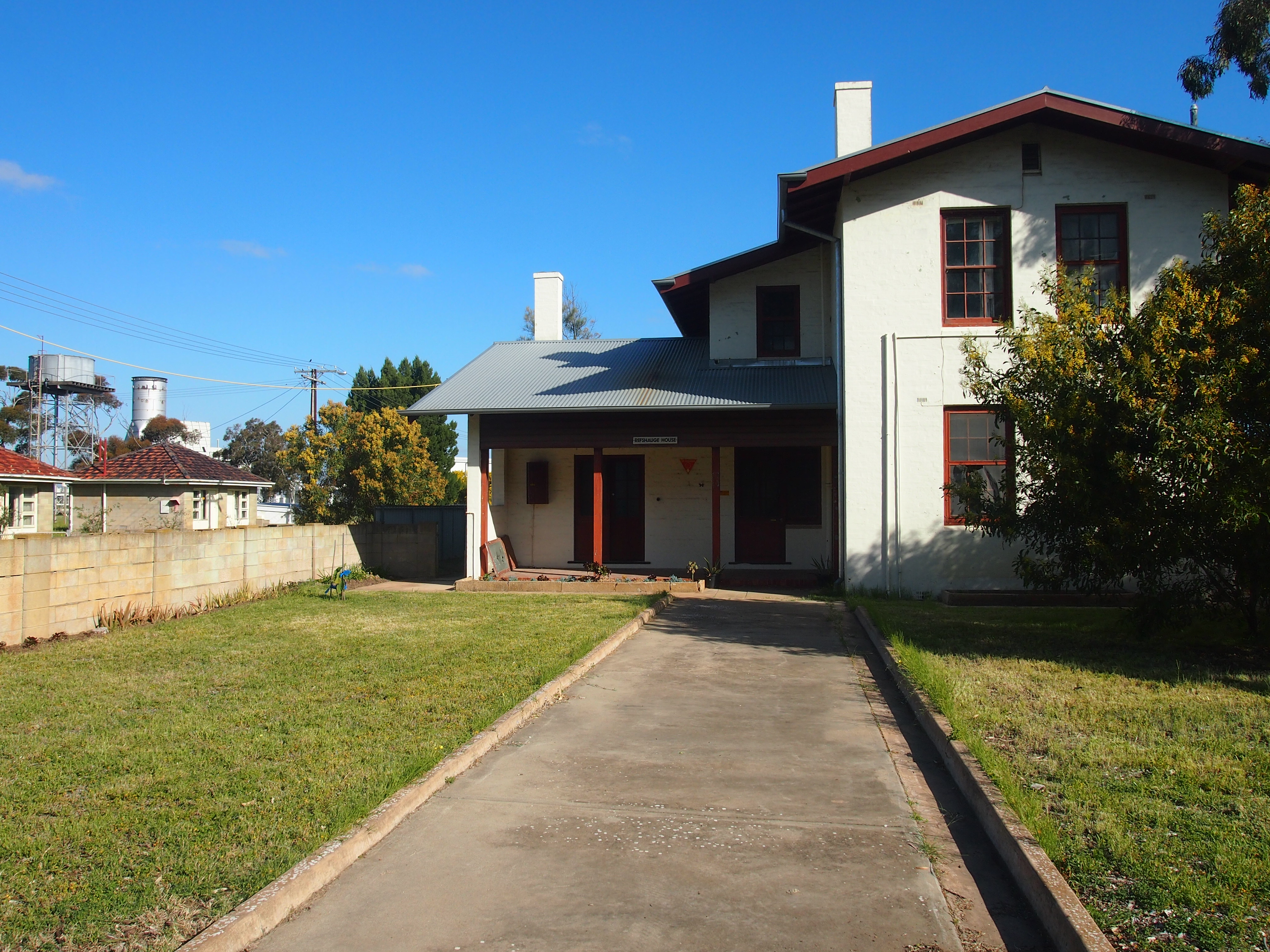
Refshauge House, built in 1916 and named for Sir William Refshauge, was the former administration building and dispensary at the Quarantine Station.

Being uninhabited, an island, adjacent to Port Adelaide, and near Outer Harbor, Torrens Island was initially used as the site of a Quarantine Station for new arrivals (by sea) to South Australia. One example of its use was during the Boonah crisis.

There were two quarantine stations on the site at different times; the surviving Torrens Island Quarantine Station is listed on the South Australian Heritage Register.

Tours of the heritage-listed Quarantine Station are conducted by the South Australian Maritime Museum.

==== Internment Camp ====
The Torrens Island Internment Camp was a World War I detention camp which held up to 400 men of German or Austro-Hungarian background between 9 October 1914 and 16 August 1915.

== Land use ==
=== Power Stations ===
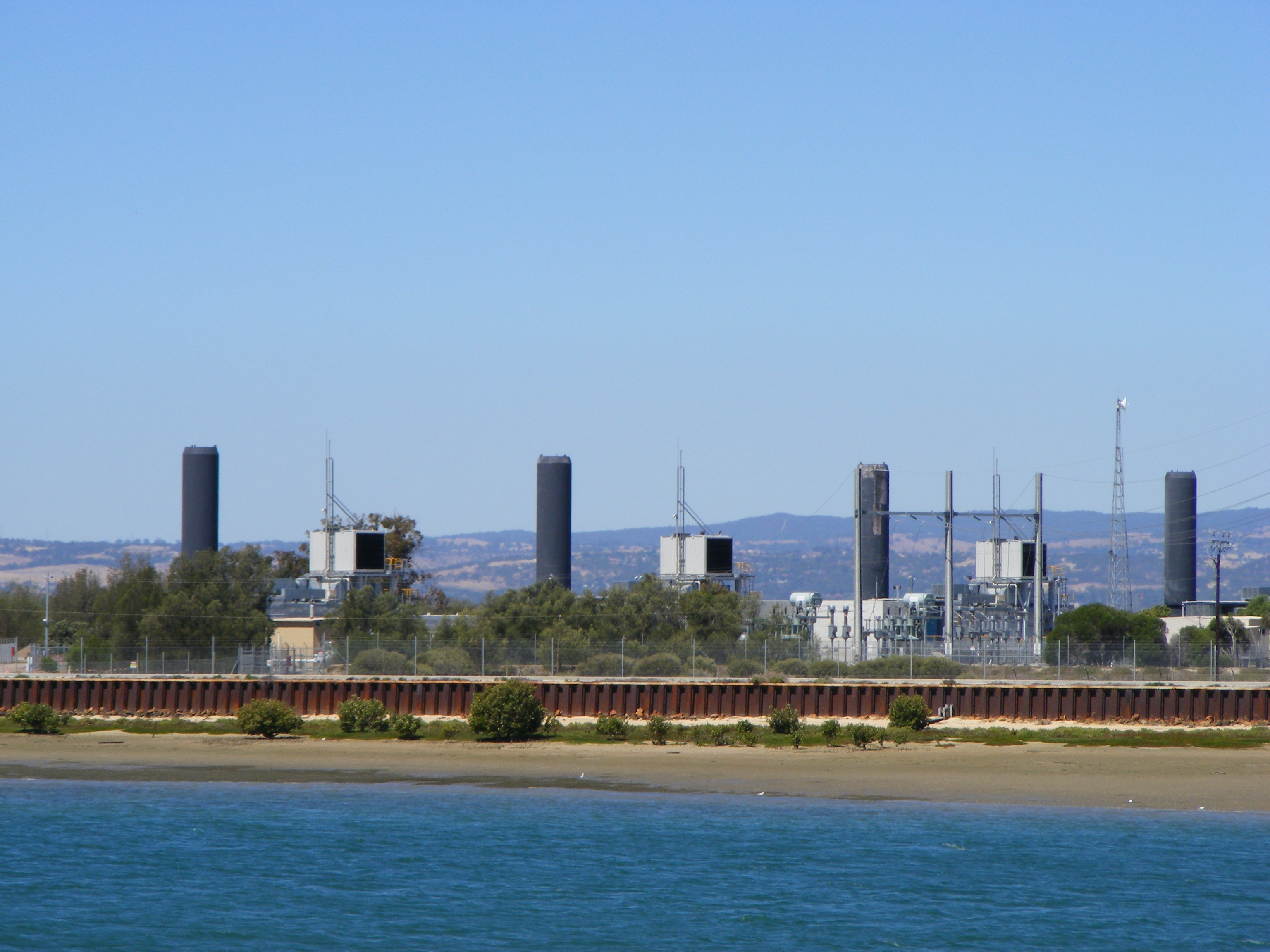
Quarantine Power Station

There are three power stations on Torrens Island:

- Torrens Island Power Station, completed in 1967, and since 2007 operated by AGL Energy; capacity of 1,280 MW.
- Quarantine Power Station, built and operated since 2002 by Origin Energy; original capacity 95 MW, expanded in 2009 to 216 MW.
- Barker Inlet Power Station was announced in 2017 with construction commenced in the third quarter of the year and opened in November 2019.

== Protected area status ==
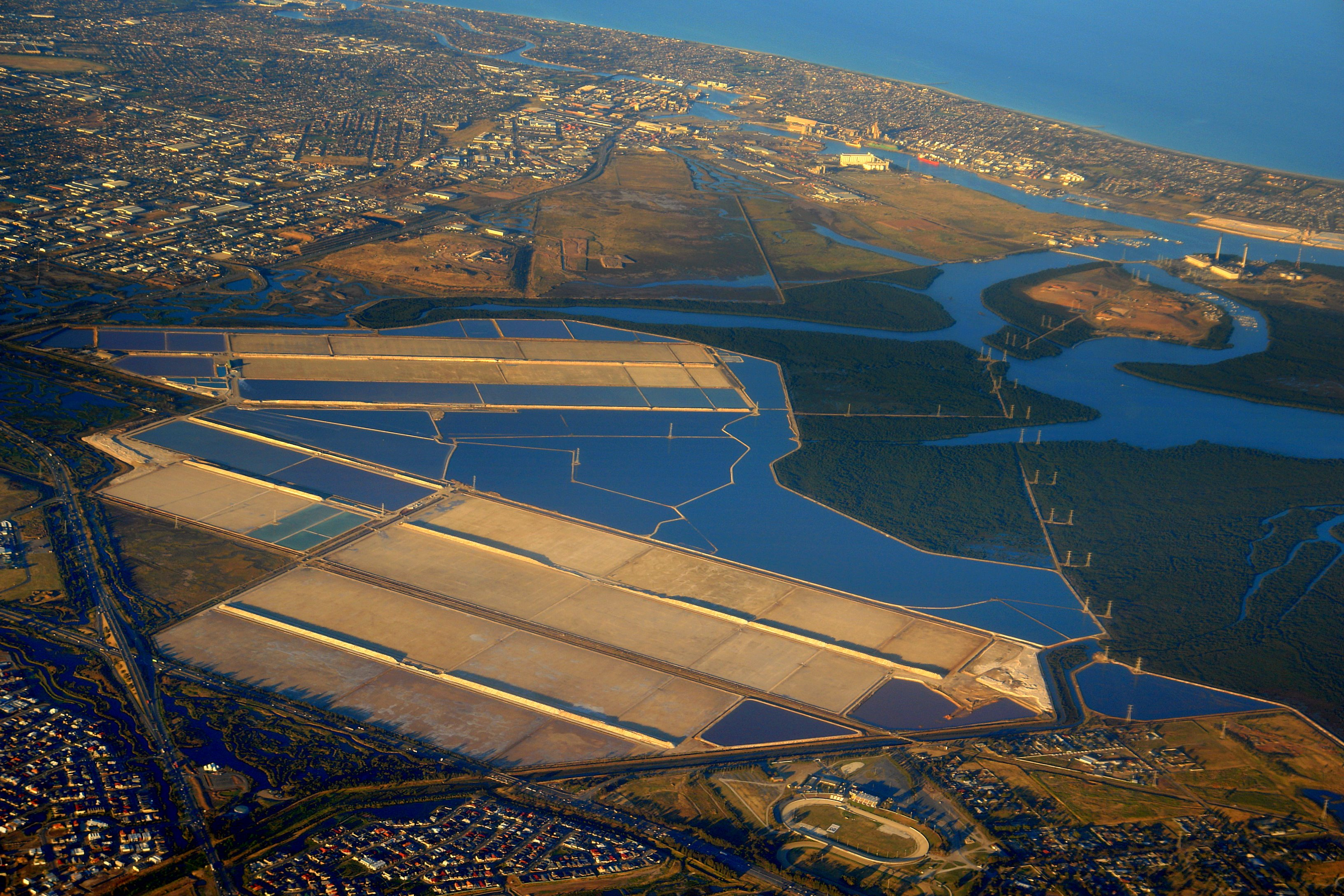
Torrens Island and the surrounding areas

Torrens Island has been located within the boundaries of the following protected areas to varying extents since 1963, 1973 and 2005 respectively – the Torrens Island Conservation Park which covers all of the island down to low water with exception to the most of land associated with the former quarantine station and the land associated with the Quarantine Power Station and Torrens Island Power Stations, the Barker Inlet-St Kilda Aquatic Reserve which covers all of the east side of the island located below high water and the Adelaide Dolphin Sanctuary which overlays the entire island.

== See also ==
- List of islands of Australia
- List of power stations in South Australia
