= Glugea =

Scientific classification
- Kingdom: Fungi
- Phylum: Rozellomycota
- Class: Microsporidia
- Order: Glugeida
- Family: Glugeidae
- Genus: Glugea; Thélohan, 1891

Genus of microsporidian parasites

Glugea is a genus of microsporidian parasites, predominantly infecting fish. Infections of Glugea cause xenoma formation.

Currently, Phylogenetic tree of this genus seem unreliable, as not enough evidence is present, therefore species with their common hosts are given in a list:

- G. anomala (syn. G. weissenbergi) – a parasite of the three-spined stickleback and the ninespine stickleback
- G. atherinae – a parasite of the big-scale sand smelt
- G. berglax – a parasite of the roughhead grenadier
- G. bychowski – a parasite of the Caspian anadromous shad
- G. capverdensis – a parasite of the spotted lanternfish
- G. heraldi – a parasite of the seahorse Hippocampus erectus
- G. hertwigi – a parasite of the European smelt and the Rainbow smelt
- G. nagelia – a parasite of the yellowfin hind
- G. plecoglossi – a parasite of the ayu sweetfish
- G. sardinellensis – a parasite of fish of the genus Sardinella
- G. shiplei – a parasite of fish of the pouting
- G. stephani – a parasite of Pleuronectes flesus, the winter flounder, the English sole, and the Common dab
- G. vincentiae – a parasite of the Australian marine teleost fish, Vincentia conspersa
- G. truttae – a parasite of the brown trout

Spraguea lophii has formerly been described as G. americanus.

Microgemma caulleryi that infects the greater sand eel was previously classified as G. caulleryi.
