= Clinton, South Australia =

Clinton
- Town
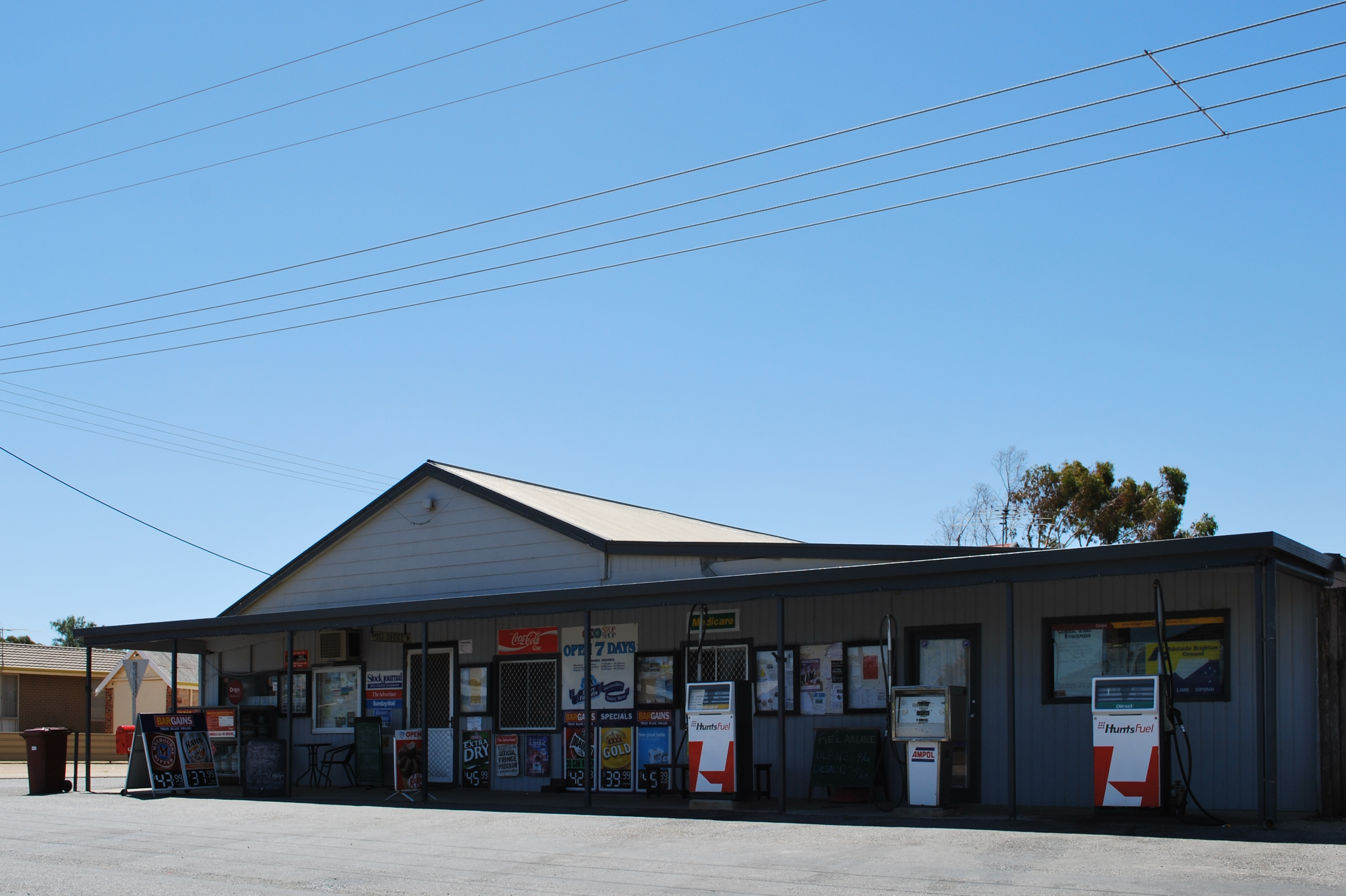
- General store

- Coordinates: 34°13′31″S 138°01′06″E
- Country: Australia
- State: South Australia
- Region: Yorke and Mid North
- LGA: Yorke Peninsula Council
- Location: 101 km (63 mi) NW of Adelaide; 36 km (22 mi) NE of Maitland
- Established: 14 August 1862 (town); 27 May 1999 (locality)

Government
  - State electorate: Narungga
  - Federal division: Grey

Population
  - Total: 313 (SAL 2021)
- Postcode: 5570
- County: Daly
- Mean max temp: 22.6 °C (72.7 °F)
- Mean min temp: 10.7 °C (51.3 °F)
- Annual rainfall: 332.0 mm (13.07 in)
Localities around Clinton
| Kainton | Kainton | Gulf St Vincent |
| Clinton Centre | Clinton | Gulf St Vincent |
| Winulta | Price | Gulf St Vincent |
- Locations; Adjoining localities

Clinton (also known as Port Clinton) is a locality in the Australian state of South Australia located on the east coast of Yorke Peninsula overlooking the north west head of Gulf St Vincent about 101 kilometres (63 mi) west of the state capital of Adelaide and about 36 kilometres (22 mi) north-east of the municipal seat of Maitland.

== History ==
The Hundred of Clinton was proclaimed on 12 June 1862 over land with an area of 350 square kilometres (137 mi^{2}).

The town was surveyed during March 1862 by A Cooper and land offered for auction on 14 August 1862. The town was named by Dominick Daly, the Governor of South Australia after Henry Pelham F.P. Clinton, the Duke of Newcastle who served as "the Secretary of State for the Colonies from 1859 until his death in October 1864."

The port was surveyed in 1862, with a jetty being erected in 1863. Surveys and closer settlement by farmers soon followed, along with land clearing of the mallee woodland.

The first European occupiers were leaseholder pastoralists. In 1854 in the northern parts of the Hundred of Clinton, W. & A. Rogers leased 190 square kilometres (75 mi^{2}) at an annual rental of ten shillings per square mile. In 1860, near the centre of the Hundred, T. & W. Day leased 31 square kilometres (12 mi^{2}).

This was an important and busy port in the 1860s and 70s, being a transfer point for goods and passengers travelling between Port Adelaide and the copper mines at Wallaroo and Moonta. That was despite the shallowness of the beach, which closed the port to larger vessels during low tide.

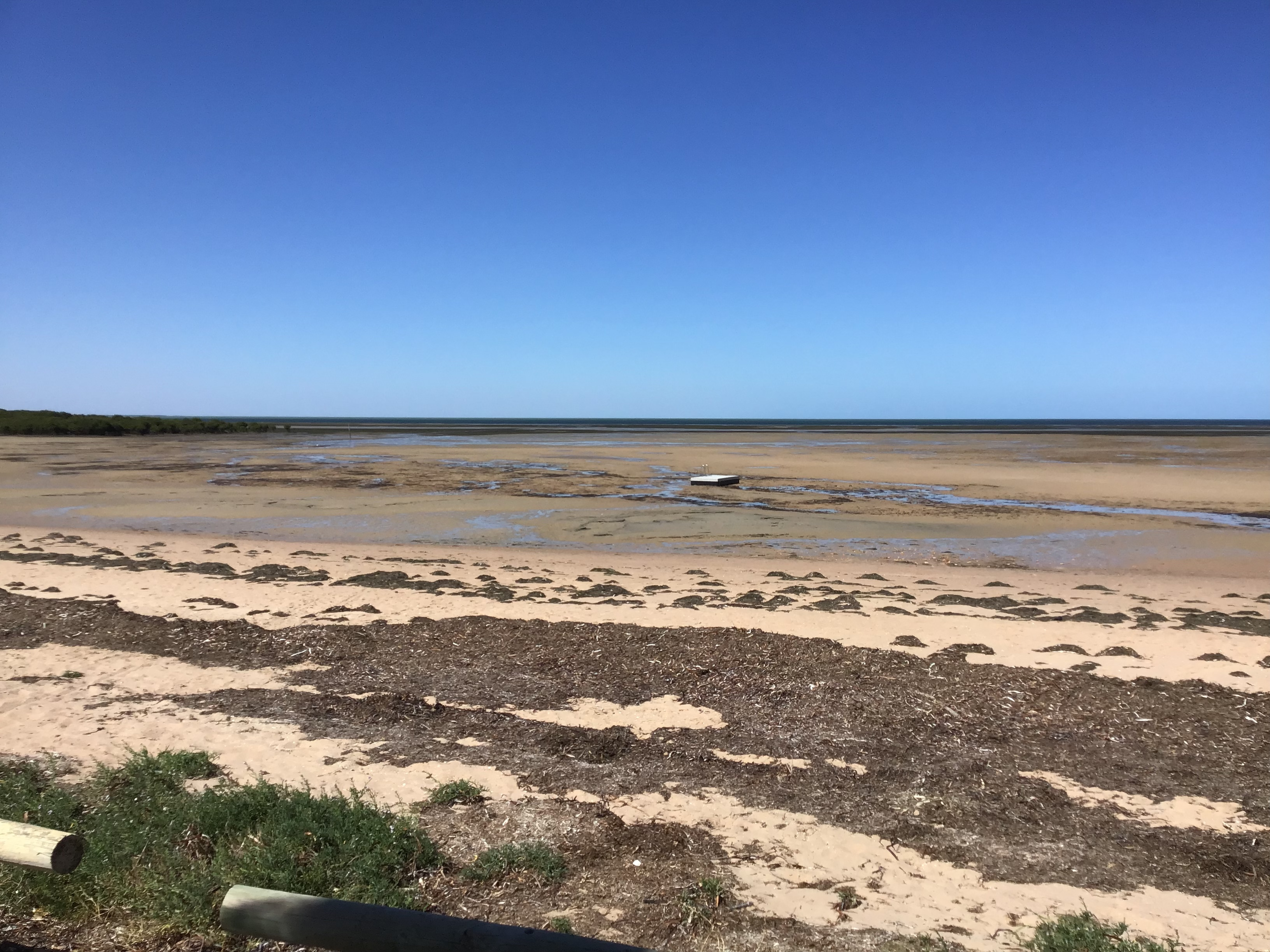
Beach and mud flats just after low tide

On 28 November 1878, the District Council of Clinton was established. Clinton began a gradual decline after 1878 when the railway between Wallaroo and Adelaide was completed. The jetty was dismantled in 1916.

Boundaries for the locality were created on 27 May 1999 for the "long established name." The name Port Clinton was reported in 2013 as being a "variant" name and as being the "incorrect name for town."

== Present day ==
Clinton, "the Gateway to the Eastern Yorke Peninsula", is a 1.5 hour drive from the capital of South Australia, Adelaide.

Having a boat ramp, Clinton is popular for trailer boating. It has a beach for children, along with recreational fishing and crabbing areas. Raking for blue swimmer crabs is done on the extensive mud flats at low tide. As a result, since the 1950s the township has attracted the construction of beach and holiday houses.

Accommodation in the town is varied and includes various holiday rentals. Shopping is available at the Local General Store and in the township of Ardrossan a 23 km down the road.

The rural land surrounding Clinton is primarily used for dry grain farming of wheat and barley, with some sheep grazing.

== Notable residents ==
- George McLeay, Minister in the Menzies government and member of the Australian House of Representatives
- Sir John McLeay, longest serving speaker of the Australian House of Representatives and former Lord Mayor of Adelaide

== See also ==
- List of cities and towns in South Australia
- Clinton Conservation Park
