= Price, South Australia =

Price
- Town
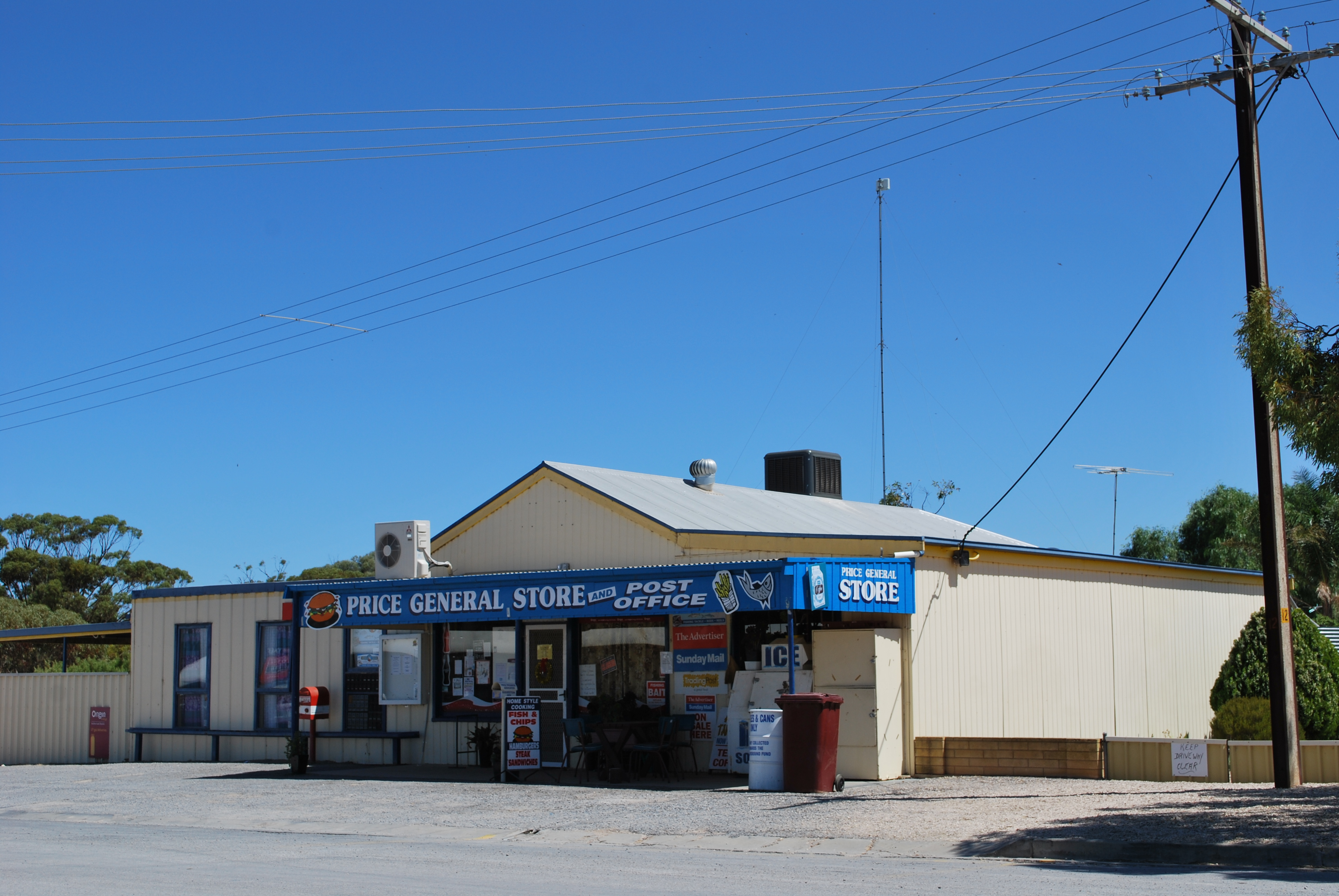
- General store and post office

- Coordinates: 34.2879°S 137.992921°E
- Country: Australia
- State: South Australia
- Region: Yorke and Mid North
- LGA: Yorke Peninsula Council
- Location: 131 km (81 mi) NW of Adelaide city centre; 69 km (43 mi) SE of Kadina; 18 km (11 mi) N of Ardrossan
- Established: 3 August 1882 (town); 27 May 1999 (locality)

Government
  - State electorate: Narungga
  - Federal division: Grey
- Elevation: 2 m (6.6 ft)

Population
  - Total: 205 (SAL 2021)
- Postcode: 5570
- County: Daly; Fergusson
- Mean max temp: 22.6 °C (72.7 °F)
- Mean min temp: 10.6 °C (51.1 °F)
- Annual rainfall: 321.7 mm (12.67 in)
Localities around Price
Clinton Centre	Clinton Centre; Clinton	Gulf St Vincent
Winulta; Dowlingville	Price	Gulf St Vincent
Dowlingville	Gulf St Vincent	Gulf St Vincent

Price is a town and locality on Yorke Peninsula in South Australia. It is within the Yorke Peninsula Council local government area and is 131 kilometres (81 mi) north west of the centre of state capital, Adelaide.

== History and development ==
The township, which was proclaimed on 3 August 1882, is near the northern boundary of the Hundred of Cunningham.

It was named by Sir William Jervois, Governor of South Australia 1877–83, after his daughter in law, Florence Annie Price, who married John Jervois, his eldest son. She was a daughter of Henry Strong Price, a pioneer pastoralist of the Flinders Ranges.

Boundaries for the locality were created on 27 May 1999 for the "long established name."

The principal local industries are grain farming and salt production. In the case of the latter, approximately 170,000 tonnes of sea salt is harvested from 1,000 ha (2,500 acres) of coastal salt evaporation ponds each year. Cheetham Salt owns the operations.

Tourism facilities are limited to the Wheatsheaf Hotel, established 1886, and a caravan park.

== Wills Creek ==
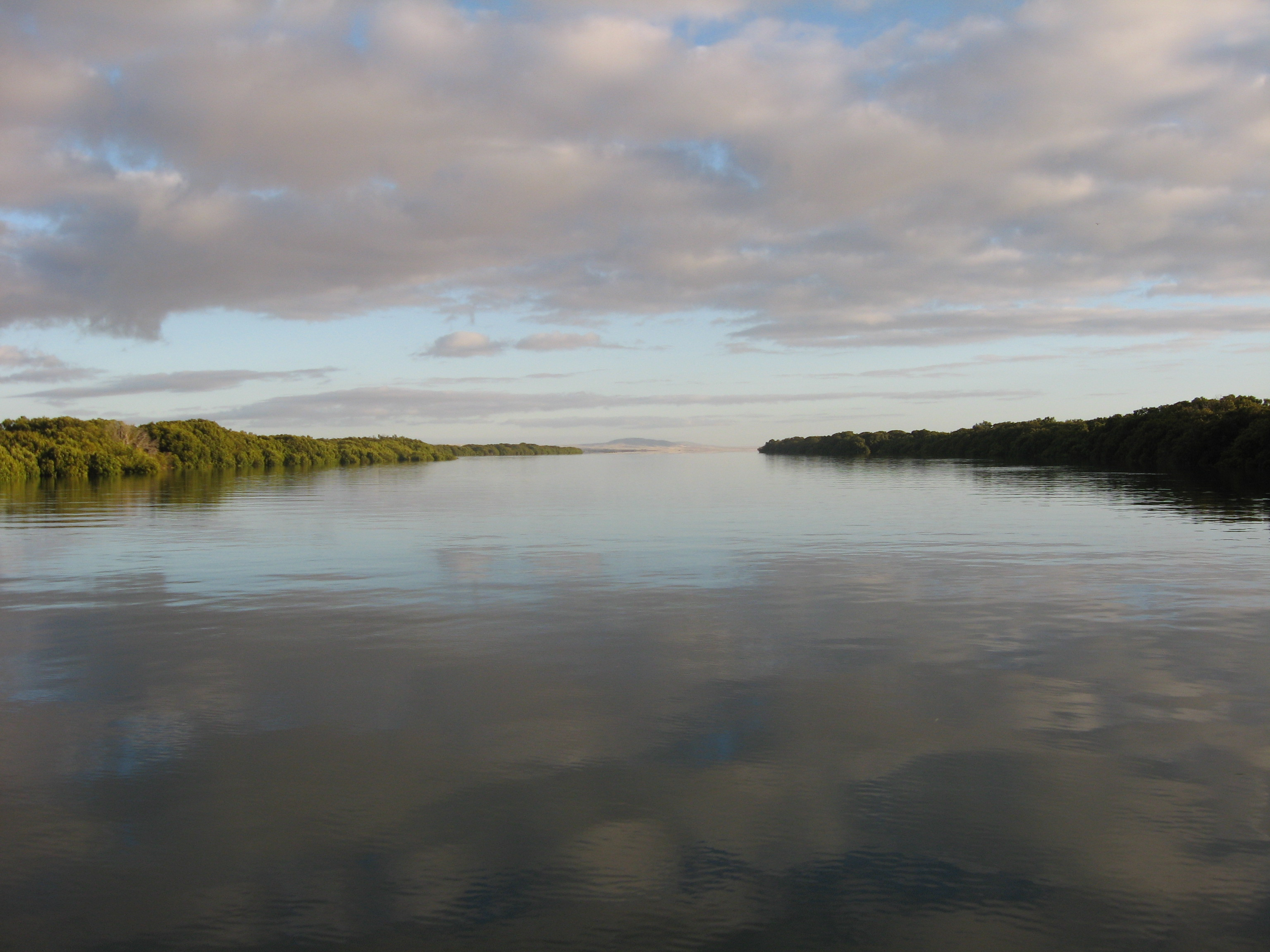
Wills Creek at high tide

Although not right on the coast, Price has a causeway running to a mangrove-fringed tidal creek, Wills Creek, which connects it with the sea (Gulf St Vincent). At the end of the causeway there is a public boat ramp. Once outside the creek, fishing is plentiful.

Wills Creek is a very sheltered anchorage for boats and, in earlier times, it was from here that bagged salt and grain was loaded onto ketches for export. These products are now transported in bulk form by road. A 1911 newspaper reported that most of the ketches visiting Price via Wills Creek had, on at least one visit, suffered the inconvenience of being stuck in the mud of the creek at low tide.

=== Climate ===
Price has a temperate semi-arid climate (Köppen: BSk) with insufficient winter rainfall to qualify as a hot-summer mediterranean climate. On average, the town experiences 59.0 clear days and 59.3 cloudy days per annum. Extreme temperatures ranged from 46.7 °C (116.1 °F) on 14 January 2001 to −2.6 °C (27.3 °F) on 13 June 1972. The wettest recorded day was 18 February 1946 with 161.3 mm (6.35 in) of rainfall.

Climate data for Price (34.30°S 138.00°E) (2 m (6.6 ft) AMSL) (1944-2025)
Month	Jan	Feb	Mar	Apr	May	Jun	Jul	Aug	Sep	Oct	Nov	Dec	Year
Record high °C (°F)	46.7 (116.1)	46.0 (114.8)	44.0 (111.2)	39.5 (103.1)	30.4 (86.7)	27.0 (80.6)	27.1 (80.8)	30.1 (86.2)	35.0 (95.0)	40.7 (105.3)	44.5 (112.1)	45.0 (113.0)	46.7 (116.1)
Mean daily maximum °C (°F)	28.7 (83.7)	28.0 (82.4)	26.4 (79.5)	23.5 (74.3)	19.6 (67.3)	16.5 (61.7)	15.9 (60.6)	17.2 (63.0)	19.9 (67.8)	22.9 (73.2)	24.8 (76.6)	27.2 (81.0)	22.6 (72.6)
Mean daily minimum °C (°F)	15.7 (60.3)	16.0 (60.8)	14.2 (57.6)	11.3 (52.3)	8.9 (48.0)	7.0 (44.6)	6.2 (43.2)	6.2 (43.2)	7.3 (45.1)	9.2 (48.6)	11.7 (53.1)	13.8 (56.8)	10.6 (51.1)
Record low °C (°F)	7.0 (44.6)	5.2 (41.4)	6.3 (43.3)	2.4 (36.3)	0.0 (32.0)	−2.6 (27.3)	−2.2 (28.0)	−1.0 (30.2)	−0.6 (30.9)	1.0 (33.8)	4.0 (39.2)	5.8 (42.4)	−2.6 (27.3)
Average precipitation mm (inches)	15.3 (0.60)	18.8 (0.74)	17.1 (0.67)	25.0 (0.98)	35.8 (1.41)	37.0 (1.46)	37.3 (1.47)	34.6 (1.36)	32.2 (1.27)	28.6 (1.13)	21.2 (0.83)	19.1 (0.75)	321.7 (12.67)
Average precipitation days (≥ 0.2 mm)	3.4	3.1	4.2	6.4	10.3	11.2	12.2	11.7	9.3	7.7	5.3	4.4	89.2
Average afternoon relative humidity (%)	52	52	56	58	65	70	69	65	61	59	53	52	59
Average dew point °C (°F)	14.2 (57.6)	14.7 (58.5)	13.9 (57.0)	11.8 (53.2)	10.6 (51.1)	9.0 (48.2)	8.7 (47.7)	8.9 (48.0)	10.0 (50.0)	10.9 (51.6)	11.8 (53.2)	13.0 (55.4)	11.5 (52.6)
Source: Bureau of Meteorology (1944-2025)

== See also ==
- Hundred of Price
- Wills Creek Conservation Park
- Gulf St Vincent Important Bird Area
