= Clinton Conservation Park =

Protected area in South Australia

- IUCN category III (natural monument or feature)
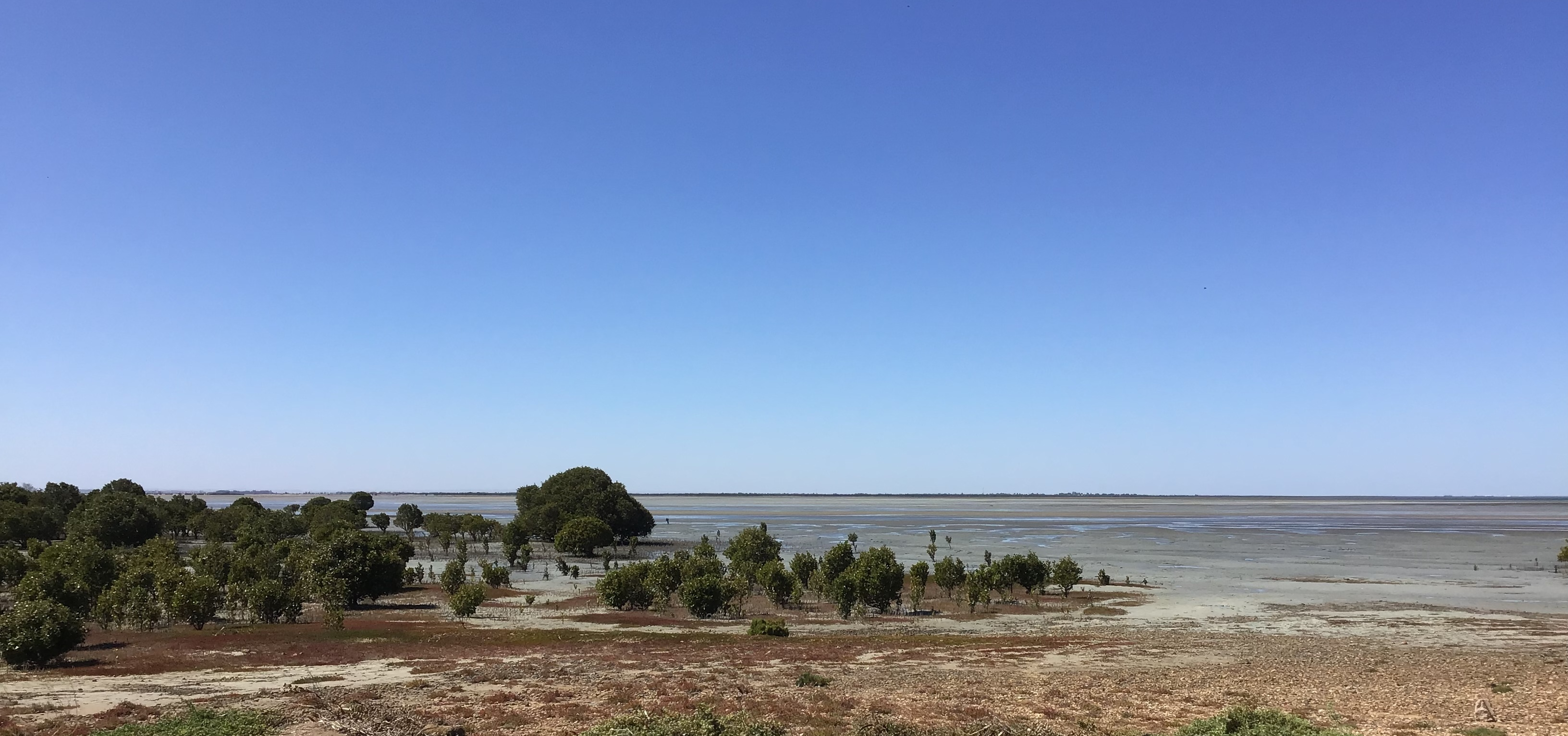
- Mangroves in the littoral zone of Clinton Conservation Park at Port Arthur

- Location within South Australia
- Location: South Australia
- Nearest city: Clinton; Port Wakefield
- Coordinates: 34°08′08″S 138°06′26″E
- Area: 19.15 km^{2} (7.39 sq mi)
- Established: 10 September 1970
- Visitors: 'low' (in 2009)
- Governing body: Department for Environment and Water

Clinton Conservation Park, formerly the Clinton National Park, is a protected area in the Australian state of South Australia located on the coastline at the north end of Gulf St Vincent.

The conservation park consists of two parts with the first extending from Clinton on Yorke Peninsula on the west side of Gulf St Vincent to Port Wakefield on the east side of the gulf and the second extending south of Port Wakefield to Sandy Point. The conservation park was originally proclaimed in 1970 as the Clinton National Park under the National Parks Act 1966, was re-proclaimed under the National Parks and Wildlife Act 1972. The area contained within the conservation park including the ‘head of gulf wetland and Wakefield River estuary’ is considered to be ‘important as a fish nursery and a significant site for migratory wading birds’.

In 1980, the conservation park was described as follows:

Clinton Conservation Park preserves one of the major mangrove and saltflat associations in the State. These associations are markedly depleted in South Australia. The park is an important bird and marine fauna habitat...

An area of tidal flats at the head of the Gulf of St Vincent containing mangroves (Avicennia marina), samphire (Arthrocnemum spp.) salt marsh and also including a low backing dune...

Essentially undisturbed, the complete coastal swamp complex, including backing dune, is protected.

The conservation park is classified as an IUCN Category III protected area. In 1980, it was listed on the now-defunct Register of the National Estate.

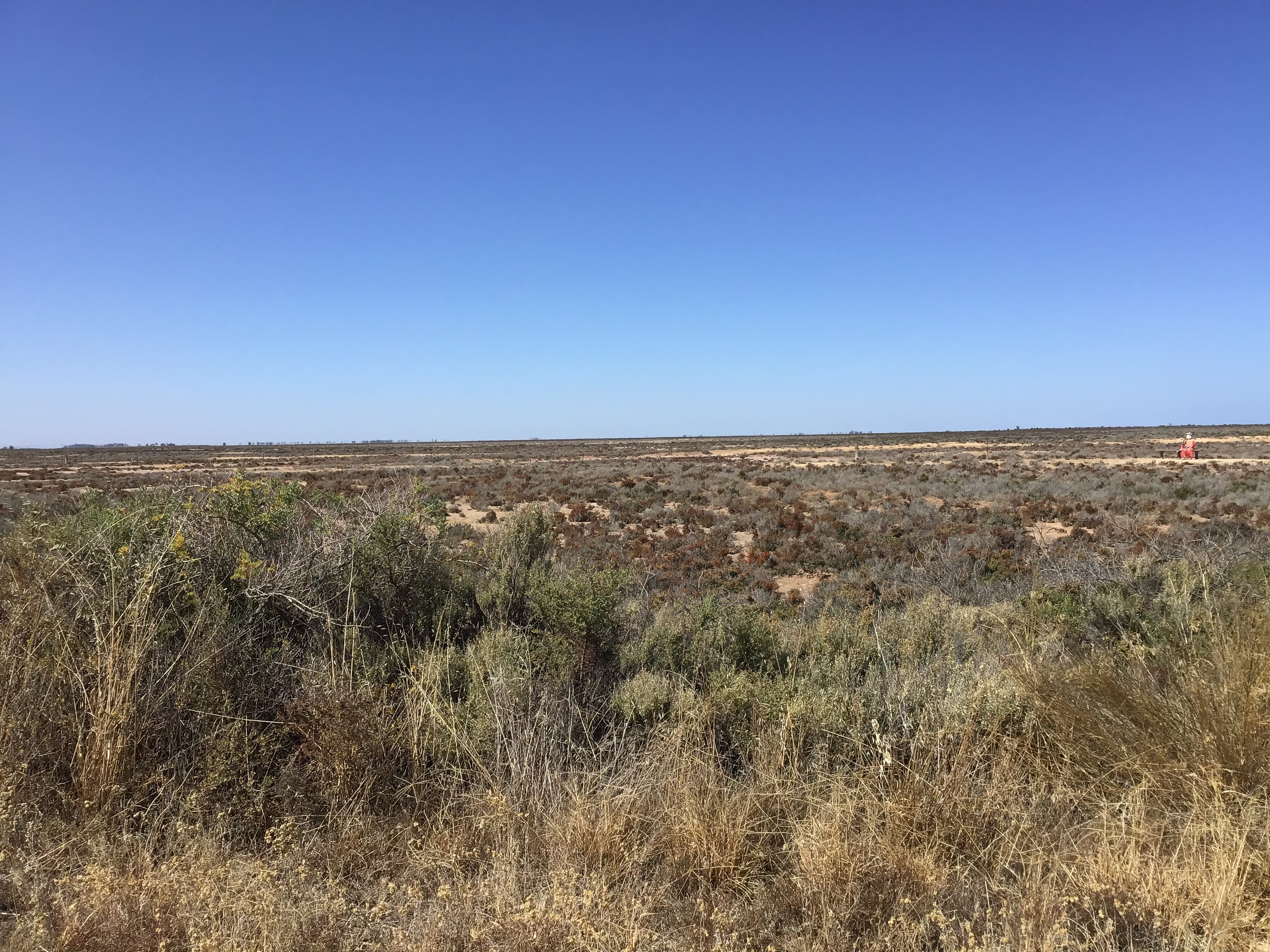
Saltbush flats in Clinton Conservation Park

== See also ==
- Protected areas of South Australia
- Gulf St Vincent Important Bird Area
