= Wills Creek Conservation Park =

Protected area in South Australia

- IUCN category VI (protected area with sustainable use of natural resources)
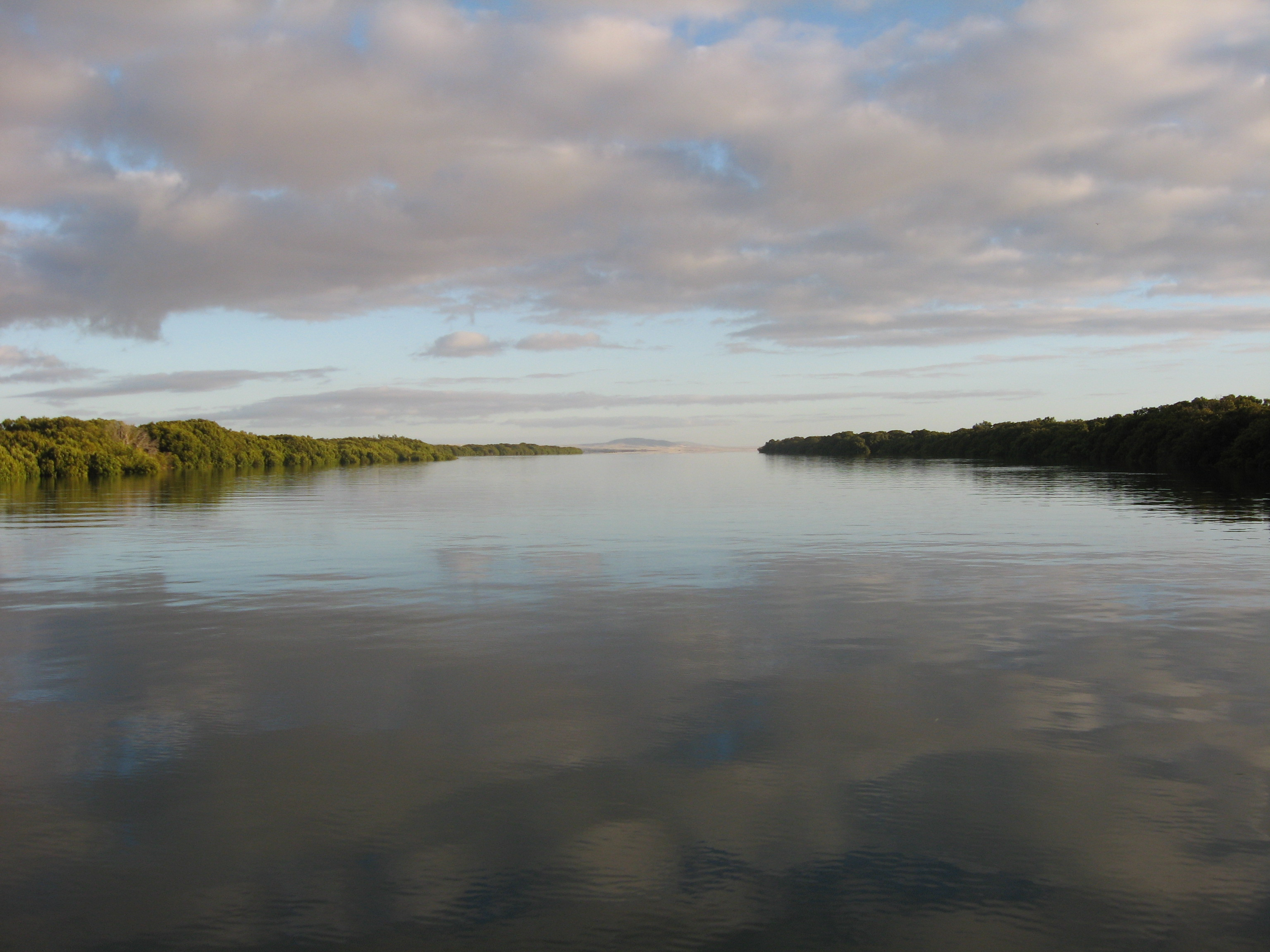
- Wills Creek, Yorke Peninsula - high tide at dawn

- Location within South Australia
- Location: South Australia
- Nearest city: Price
- Coordinates: 34°17′51″S 138°1′2″E
- Area: 22.98 km^{2} (8.87 sq mi)
- Established: 14 December 2006
- Governing body: Department for Environment and Water

Wills Creek Conservation Park is a protected area located on the Yorke Peninsula adjoining the north west coast of Gulf St Vincent in South Australia immediately east of Price. The conservation park, which was proclaimed in 2006 under the National Parks and Wildlife Act 1972, is considered to be "a significant coastal wetland/estuary area supporting mangroves and intertidal habitats" and that two creeks located within its boundaries, Wills and Shag Creeks, are "known fish nursery areas" and "an important habitat for seabirds". The conservation park is classified as an IUCN Category VI protected area.

== See also ==
- Gulf St Vincent Important Bird Area
