= Dowlingville, South Australia =

Dowlingville
- Town
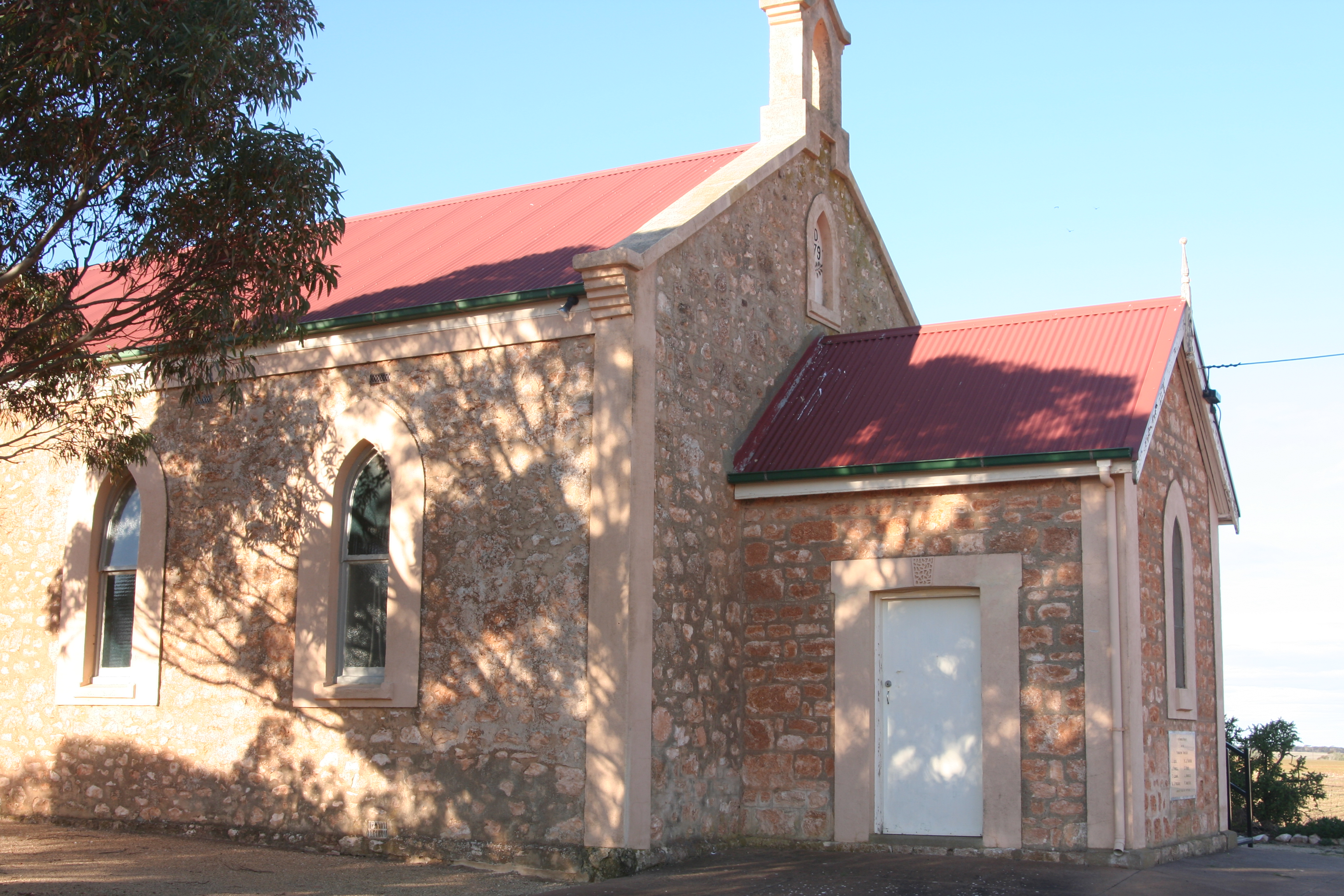
- Dowlingville Uniting (formerly Methodist) Church in 2012

- Coordinates: 34.327010°S 137.919250°E
- Country: Australia
- State: South Australia
- Region: Yorke and Mid North
- LGA: Yorke Peninsula Council
- Location: 89 km (55 mi) north-west of Adelaide
- Established: 1999

Government
  - State electorate: Narungga
  - Federal division: Grey

Population
  - Total: 33 (SAL 2021)
- Time zone: UTC+9:30 (ACST)
  - Summer (DST): UTC+10:30 (ACST)
- Postcode: 5555
- County: Fergusson
- Mean max temp: 22.6 °C (72.7 °F)
- Mean min temp: 10.7 °C (51.3 °F)
- Annual rainfall: 332.0 mm (13.07 in)
Localities around Dowlingville
Winulta	Winulta	Price
Petersville	Dowlingville	Price; Gulf St Vincent
Cunningham	Ardrossan; Tiddy Widdy Beach	Gulf St Vincent
- Distances; Coordinates; Climate; Adjoining localities

Dowlingville is a locality in the Australian state of South Australia, located on the east coast of Yorke Peninsula immediately adjoining Gulf St Vincent about 89 kilometres (55 miles) north-west of the state capital of Adelaide. Its boundaries were created in May 1999.

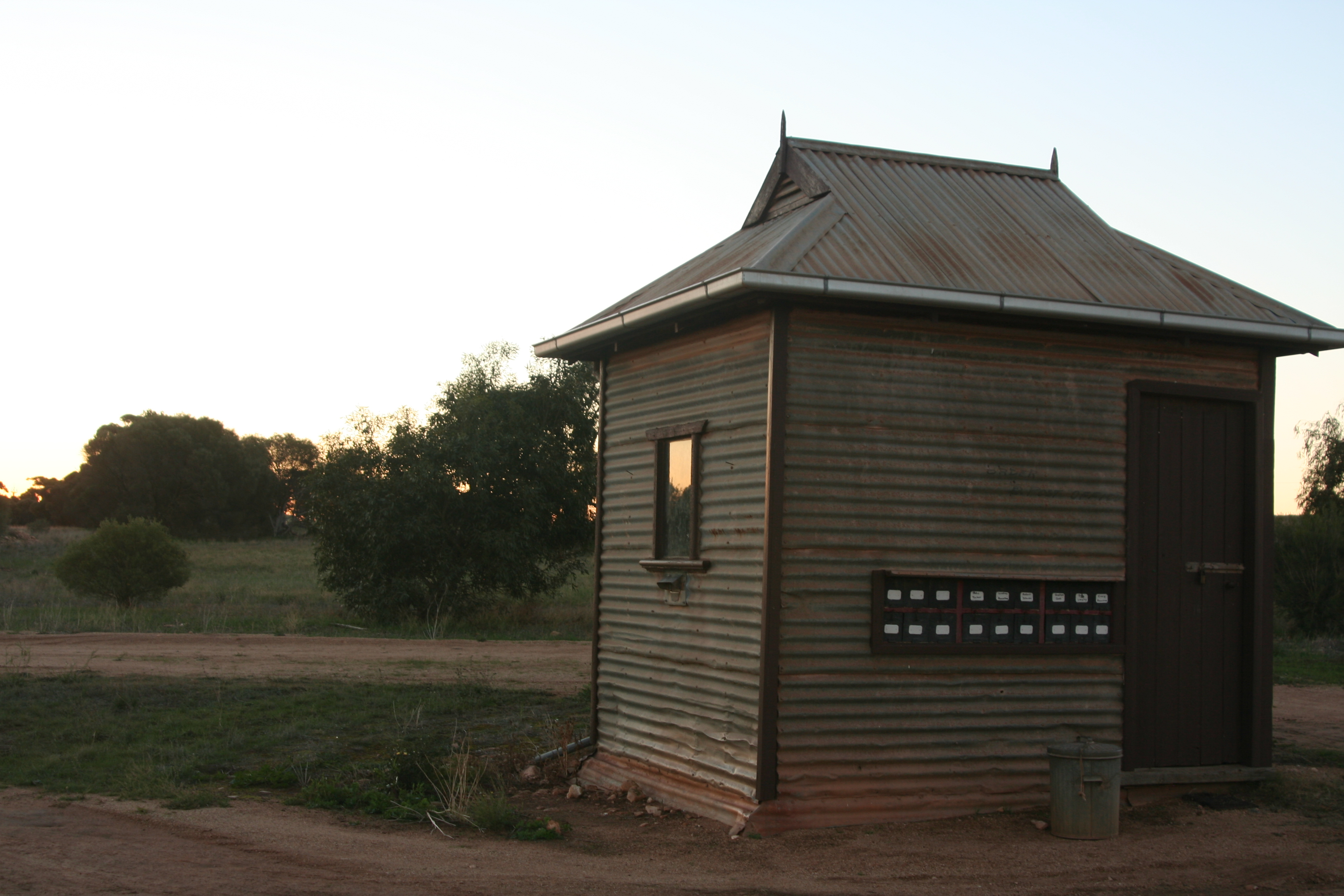
Dowlingville Post Office in 2012

The name of the locality is considered to have been derived from a Mr G. P. Dowling Whittaker who was an early resident, and grandson of Rev. George Pike Dowling of Somerset. In 1904 it was described as

This is essentially a farming district, so that it is not surprising to find only a few houses, one store, a post office (conducted by Mr Whittaker), a state school (in charge of Mrs Lewis), and a church. Only a few years ago this country was covered with scrub. Industry and manures have transformed the district considerably.

— The Register, 3 May 1904

The locality contains the historic former Dowlingville Post Office, which is listed on the South Australian Heritage Register.

As of 2014, the majority land use within the locality is primary production.

Dowlingville is located within the federal division of Grey, the state electoral district of Narungga and the local government area of the Yorke Peninsula Council.

== See also ==
- List of cities and towns in South Australia
