= Tiddy Widdy Beach, South Australia =

Tiddy Widdy Beach
- Coordinates: 34.401820°S 137.939670°E
- Country: Australia
- State: South Australia
- LGA: Yorke Peninsula Council
- Location: 84 km (52 mi) north-west of Adelaide city centre; 5 km (3.1 mi) north-east of Ardrossan
- Established: 1999

Government
  - State electorate: Narungga
  - Federal division: Grey

Population
  - Total: 195 (SAL 2021)
- Time zone: UTC+9:30 (ACST)
  - Summer (DST): UTC+10:30 (ACST)
- Postcode: 5571
- Mean max temp: 22.6 °C (72.7 °F)
- Mean min temp: 10.7 °C (51.3 °F)
- Annual rainfall: 332.0 mm (13.07 in)
Localities around Tiddy Widdy Beach
Dowlingville	Dowlingville	Dowlingville
Ardrossan	Tiddy Widdy Beach	Gulf St Vincent
Ardrossan	Ardrossan	Gulf St Vincent
- Distances; Coordinates; Climate; Adjoining localities

Tiddy Widdy Beach is a locality in the Australian state of South Australia located on the east coast of Yorke Peninsula immediately adjoining Gulf St Vincent about 84 kilometres (52 miles) northwest of the Adelaide city centre and about 5 km (3 mi) northeast of the centre of Ardrossan. At the 2021 census, Tiddy Widdy Beach had a population of 195.

The settlement name comes from the local indigenous people, who called a well located north of the town as 'Tiddy Widdy Ned'.

Its boundaries were created in May 1999 in respect to the "long established name" and includes "the original shack area."

As of 2014, the land use within the locality consists of the following two zones that are parallel to the coastline - a strip of land zoned as "coastal open space" which is reserved both for community use and as a buffer against sea level rise, and a strip of land zoned as "settlement" which consists of an area of low density residential and associated buildings.

Tiddy Widdy Beach is located within the federal division of Grey, the state electoral district of Narungga and the local government area of the Yorke Peninsula Council.

Tiddy Widdy Beach area is a popular location for crabbing, fishing, the CH Smith walking trail, holiday homes, and recreational beach activities.

== See also ==
- List of cities and towns in South Australia
