= Gulf St Vincent Important Bird Area =

Important bird area in South Australia

Coordinates: 34°26′37″S 138°15′18″E

Location of the Gulf St Vincent Important Bird Area in South Australia

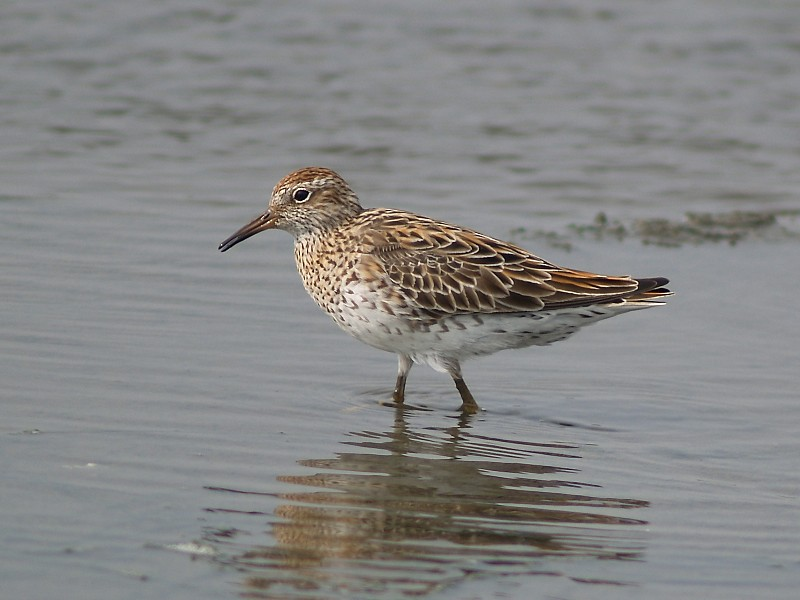
The IBA is an important area for sharp-tailed sandpipers

The Gulf St Vincent Important Bird Area comprises land extending along the coast of Gulf St Vincent, north of Adelaide, South Australia.

== Description ==
The Gulf St Vincent Important Bird Area (IBA) is a 256 square kilometres (99 square miles) strip of coastline containing the continuous mudflats along the north and north-east of Gulf St Vincent north of Adelaide. It extends from Ardrossan in the north-west, around the head of the Gulf to the mouth of the Port River and Outer Harbor in Adelaide. The main habitats are intertidal mudflats, mangroves and two large saltworks, with some small coastal wetlands.

Much of the IBA adjoins industrial and residential suburbs, especially to the north of Adelaide. Key sites include the Price saltworks, Clinton Conservation Park, Parham, Port Prime, the Dry Creek wetlands and saltworks, Salisbury wetlands, Barker Inlet wetlands, Bolivar Wastewater Treatment Plant, Buckland Park Lake, the Port River mouth, the Torrens Island complex, and Outer Harbor. Many birds move between the various sites and the area is treated as a single IBA.

== Criteria for nomination as an IBA ==
The coast of Gulf St Vincent from Ardrossan to the Barker Inlet has been identified by BirdLife International as an Important Bird Area (IBA) because it supports over 1% of the world populations of black-faced cormorants, red-necked stints, sharp-tailed sandpipers, banded stilts, red-capped plovers, sooty and pied oystercatchers, and silver gulls. It also supports populations of Australasian bitterns and fairy terns.

== Associated protected areas ==
While the IBA has no statutory status, it does overlap the following protected areas declared by the South Australian government: Barker Inlet-St Kilda Aquatic Reserve, Clinton Conservation Park, St Kilda – Chapman Creek Aquatic Reserve, Torrens Island Conservation Park and Wills Creek Conservation Park.

The IBA also adjoins and overlaps the proposed Adelaide International Bird Sanctuary to be established by the South Australian government over the period 2014 to 2018 on the east side of Gulf St Vincent between Parham in the north and the southern end of Barker Inlet in the south for the purpose of rehabilitating land used as salt pans, protecting habitat for international migratory birds, managing water quality in adjoining parts of Gulf St Vincent, creation of ‘green’ space, development of niche tourism and creation of opportunities for indigenous people.

== See also ==
- List of birds of South Australia
