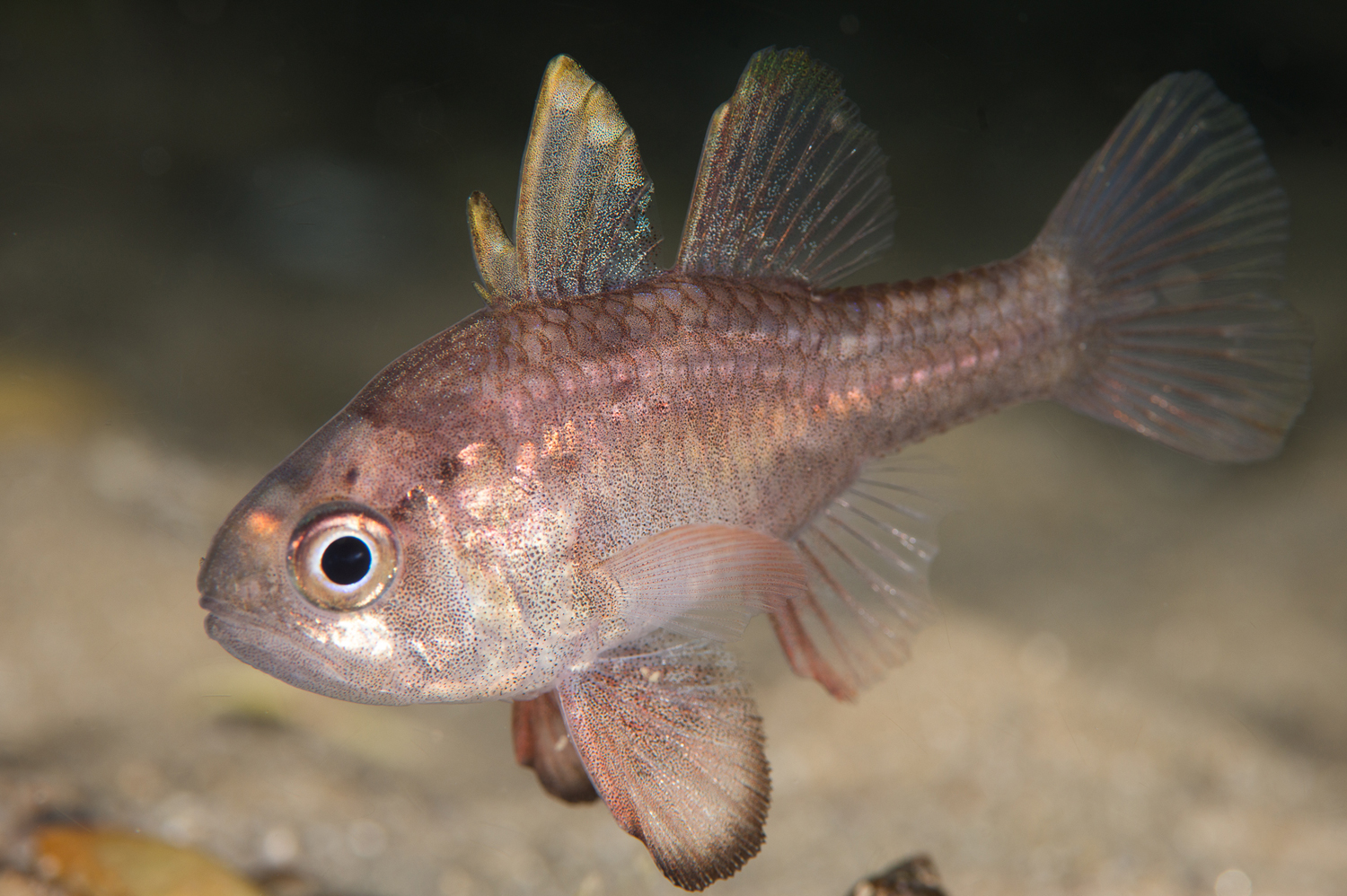

Scientific classification
- Kingdom: Animalia
- Phylum: Chordata
- Class: Actinopterygii
- Division: Teleostei
- Order: Gobiiformes
- Family: Apogonidae
- Genus: Vincentia
- Species: V. conspersa

Binomial name
- Vincentia conspersa (Klunzinger, 1872)

Synonyms
- Apogon conspersus Klunzinger, 1872; Apogon guntheri Castelnau, 1872; Vincentia waterhousii Castelnau, 1872; Apogon lemprieri Johnston, 1883; Mionorus ramsayi Fowler, 1907

= Vincentia conspersa =

Species of fish

Vincentia conspersa, the southern cardinalfish, orange cardinalfish or southern gobbleguts, is a species of marine ray-finned fish belonging to the family Apogonidae, the cardinalfishes. This cardinalfish is found in the southwestern Pacific Ocean.

== Taxonomy ==
Vincentia conspersa was first formally described as Apogon conspersus in 1872 by the German zoologist Carl Benjamin Klunzinger with its type locality given as Hobson's Bay, Victoria, Australia. This species is now classified in the genus Vincentia which was described in 1872 by François-Louis Laporte, comte de Castelnau when he described its only species Vincentia waterhousii. V waterhousii is now considered to be a synonym of A. conspersus so this species is the type species of its genus by monotypy. The genus Vincentia is one of 5 genera placed in the tribe Apogonichthyini within the subfamily Apogoninae. The family Apogonidae is in the suborder Apogonoidei in the order Gobiiformes.

This taxon may represent a species complex with V. waterhousii being from South Australia and V. lemprieri from Tasmania.

== Etymology ==
Vincentia conspersa is the type species of its genus, the name of this genus is derived from the Gulf St Vincent in South Australia, the type locality of Castelnau's V. waterhousii. The specific name , conspersa, means "speckled" in Latin and is a reference to the scattered black spots on the front of this fish, particularly on the head and pectoral fins.

== Description ==
Vincentia conspersa has a maximum total length of 14 cm (5.5 in). There are 7 spines in the first dorsal fin, a single spine and 9 soft rays in the second dorsal fin while the anal fin has 2 spines and 7-9 soft rays. The overall colour is reddish to brownish with small dark brown or blackish spots scattered over the head and body, the head is purplish above, and the fins are pinkish towards their bases and purple towards their tips.

== Distribution and habitat ==
Vincentia conspersa is found off the coast of southern Australia. Its range extends weast from Wilsons Promontory in Victoria to the middle part of the Great Australian Bight in South Australia, including Tasmania. This species occurs on reefs close to the shore, particularly where there is a cover of seaweed.

== Behaviour ==
Vincentia conspersa is a nocturnal species which shelters in caves and crevces during the day and emerge at night to feed on small shrimps and other crustaceans. The males are mouthbrooders, holding the developing eggs in their mouths and not feeding during that time.

== Parasites ==
Vincentia conspersa is infected by the marine parasite Glugea vincentiae.
