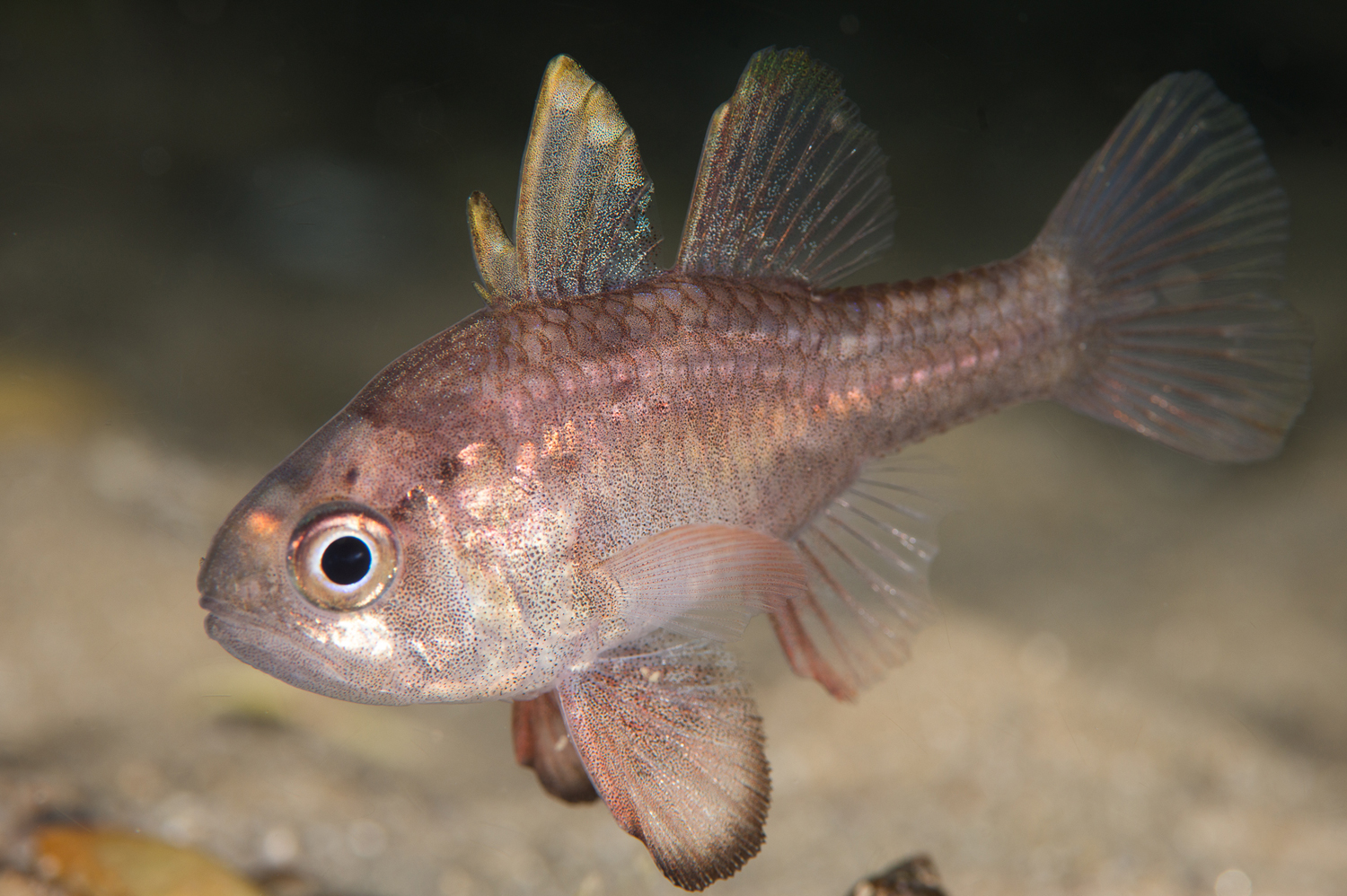
- Vincentia conspersa

Scientific classification
- Domain: Eukaryota
- Kingdom: Animalia
- Phylum: Chordata
- Class: Actinopterygii
- Order: Gobiiformes
- Family: Apogonidae
- Subfamily: Apogoninae
- Genus: Vincentia; Castelnau, 1872

Type species
- Vincentia waterhousii (synonymous with Vincentia conspersa) Castelnau 1872

= Vincentia (fish) =

Genus of fishes

Vincentia is a genus of cardinalfishes native to the eastern Indian Ocean and the southwestern Pacific Ocean. The generic name refers to Gulf St Vincent in South Australia, where the type specimen of V. waterhousii was collected.

== Species ==
The recognized species in this genus are:

- Vincentia badia G. R. Allen, 1987 (scarlet cardinalfish)
- Vincentia conspersa (Klunzinger, 1872) (southern cardinalfish)
- Vincentia macrocauda G. R. Allen, 1987 (smooth cardinalfish)
- Vincentia novaehollandiae (Valenciennes, 1832) (eastern gobbleguts)
- Vincentia punctata (Klunzinger, 1879) (orange cardinalfish)
