= Glugea vincentiae =

Scientific classification
- Kingdom: Fungi
- Phylum: Rozellomycota
- Class: Microsporidia
- Order: Glugeida
- Family: Glugeidae
- Genus: Glugea
- Species: G. vincentiae

Binomial name
- Glugea vincentiae Vagelli, Parama, Sanmartin & Leiro, 2005

Species of microsporidian fungi

Glugea vincentiae is a maritime parasite endemic to Australia. It is a parasite of the Australian marine teleost fish, Vincentia conspersa.
