= Winulta, South Australia =

Winulta
- Town
- Coordinates: 34.28°S 137.86°E
- Country: Australia
- State: South Australia
- Region: Yorke and Mid North
- LGA: Yorke Peninsula Council

Government
  - State electorate: Narungga
  - Federal division: Grey

Population
  - Total: 41 (SAL 2021)
- Postcode: 5570
- County: Daly; Fergusson
Localities around Winulta
Arthurton	Arthurton; Clinton Centre	Clinton Centre
Arthurton; Maitland	Winulta	Price
Petersville	Petersville; Dowlingville	Dowlingville

Winulta was a town in the Australian state of South Australia on northern Yorke Peninsula around 10 km from Clinton on the Clinton-Maitland road. It was first settled for farming around 1876. The earliest farmers were William Short, Thomas Kenny and John Sharrad.

The nearby "Hundred of Tiparra School" opened in 1884, was renamed "Winulta School" in 1891 and closed in 1950.

Winulta is located within the federal division of Grey, the state electoral district of Narungga and the local government area of the Yorke Peninsula Council.

== See also ==
- List of cities and towns in South Australia
