= Clinton Centre, South Australia =

Clinton Centre South Australia
- Coordinates: 34.234660°S 137.918650°E
- Population: 40 (SAL 2021)
- Established: 1999
- Postcode(s): 5570
- Time zone: ACST (UTC+9:30)
  - Summer (DST): ACST (UTC+10:30)
- Location: 99 km (62 mi) north-west of Adelaide; 27 km (17 mi) north-east of Maitland
- LGA(s): Yorke Peninsula Council
- Region: Yorke and Mid North
- County: Daly
- State electorate(s): Narungga
- Federal division(s): Grey
| Mean max temp | Mean min temp | Annual rainfall |
| 22.6 °C; 73 °F | 10.7 °C; 51 °F | 332.0 mm 13.1 in |
Suburbs around Clinton Centre:
| Sunnyvale | Kainton | Kainton |
| Arthurton | Clinton Centre | Clinton |
| Arthurton | Winulta; Price | Price |
- Footnotes: Distances; Coordinates; Climate; Adjoining localities

Clinton Centre is a locality in the Australian state of South Australia located on the northern end of Yorke Peninsula about 99 kilometres (62 miles) north-west of the state capital of Adelaide and about 27 kilometres (17 miles) north-east of the municipal seat in Maitland.

Boundaries for the locality were created in May 1999 for the "long established name." A school with the name "Clinton Centre" operated from 1886 to 1950, however this was located in what is now the adjoining locality of Clinton.

The principal land use in Clinton Centre is primary industry.

Clinton Centre is located within the federal division of Grey, the state electoral district of Narungga and the local government area of the Yorke Peninsula Council.
