= Ardrossan, South Australia =

Ardrossan
- Town
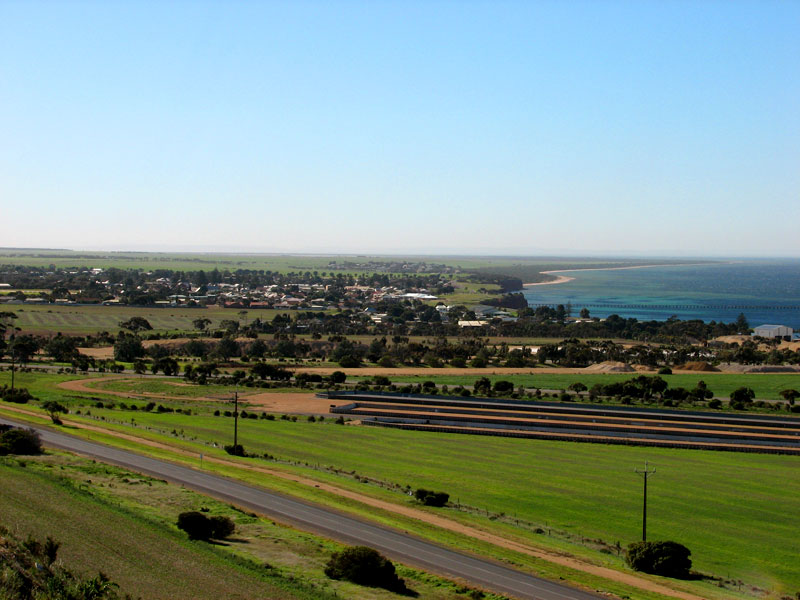
- Ardrossan and coastline viewed from a lookout

- Coordinates: 34°25′0″S 137°54′0″E
- Country: Australia
- State: South Australia
- LGA: Yorke Peninsula Council
- Location: 149 km (93 mi) North West of Adelaide via
- Established: 1873

Government
  - State electorate: Narungga
  - Federal division: Grey
- Elevation: 23 m (75 ft)

Population
  - Total: 1,188 (UCL 2021)
- Postcode: 5571
- Mean max temp: 22.6 °C (72.7 °F)
- Mean min temp: 10.7 °C (51.3 °F)
- Annual rainfall: 332.0 mm (13.07 in)
Localities around Ardrossan
Petersville	Dowlingville	Tiddy Widdy Beach
Cunningham	Ardrossan	Gulf St Vincent
Sandilands	Sandilands; James Well	Gulf St Vincent
- Climate; Adjoining localities

Ardrossan is a town in the Australian state of South Australia located on the eastern coast of the Yorke Peninsula, about 150 kilometres (93 mi) by road from the Adelaide city centre. It is notable for its deepwater shipping port and its towering coastal cliffs of red clay.

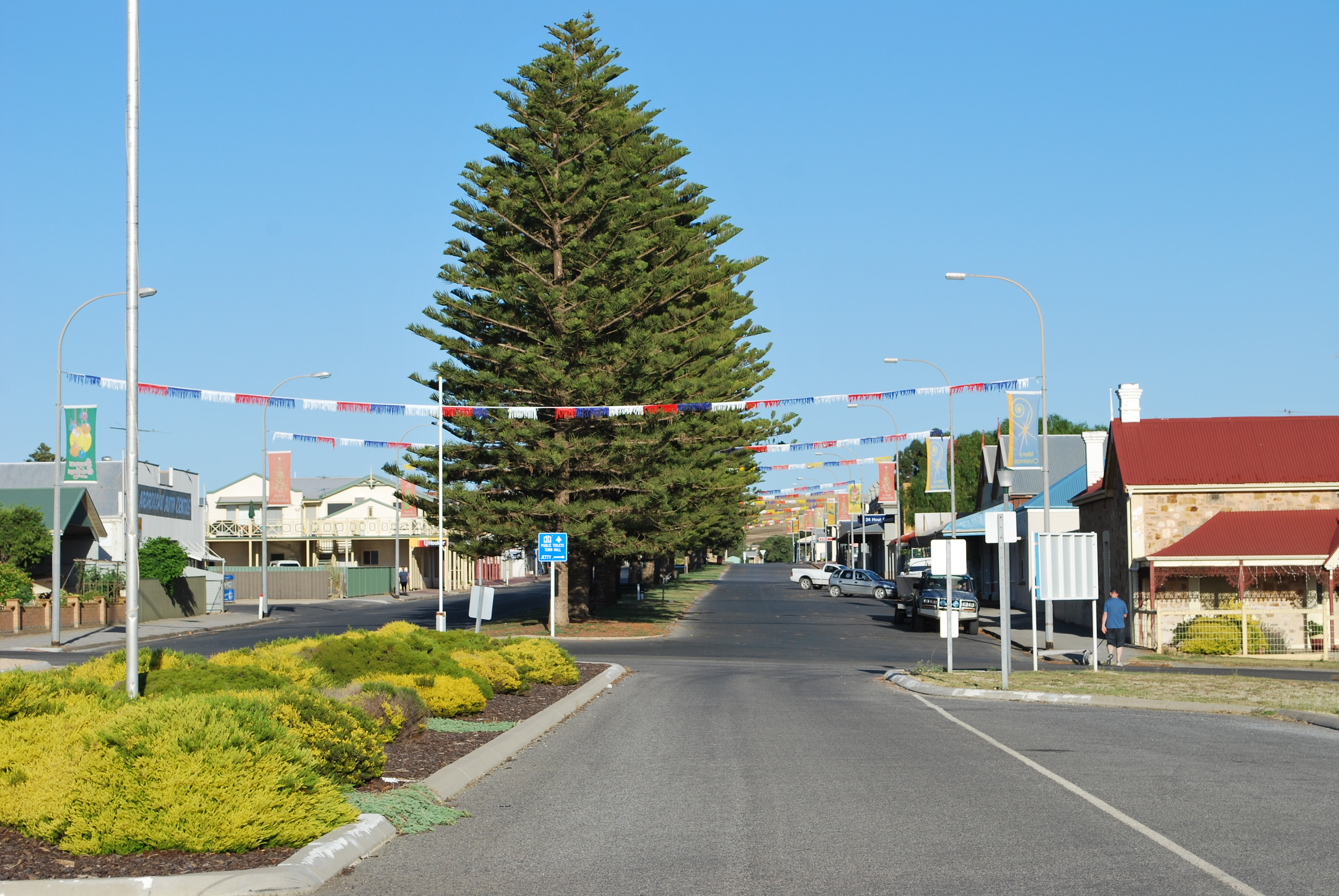
First Street

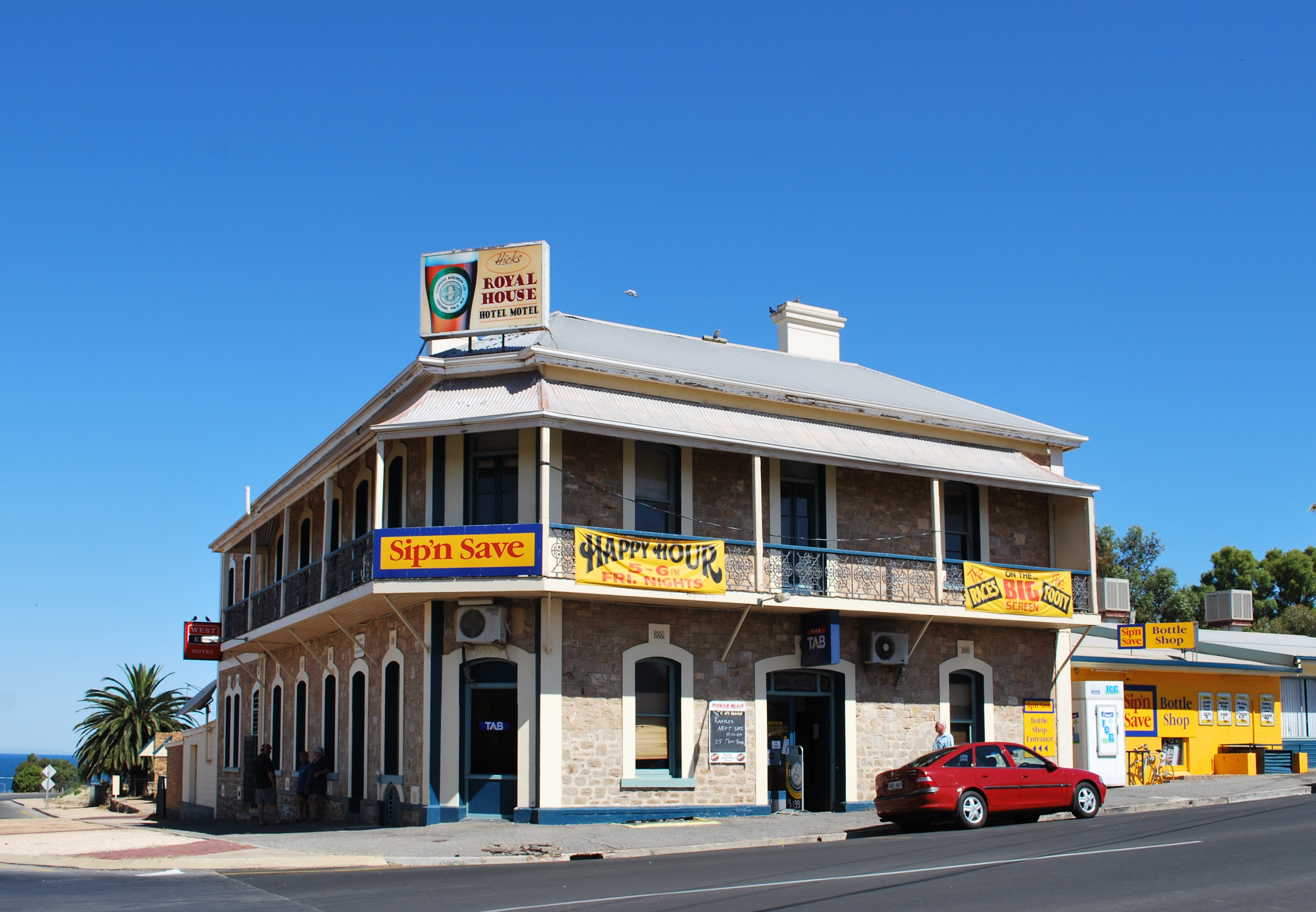
Royal House Hotel

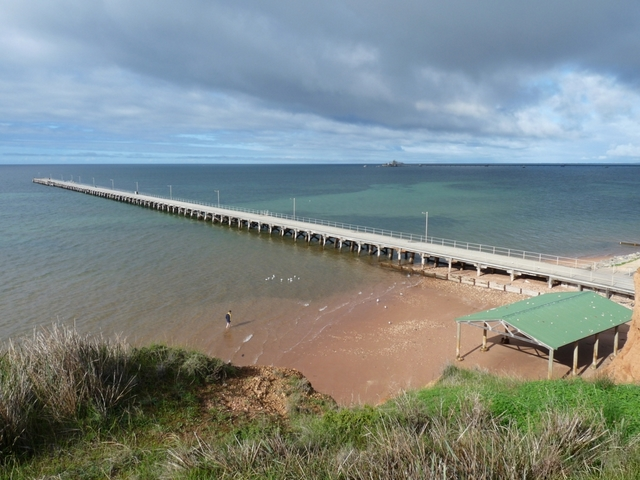
Ardrossan jetty

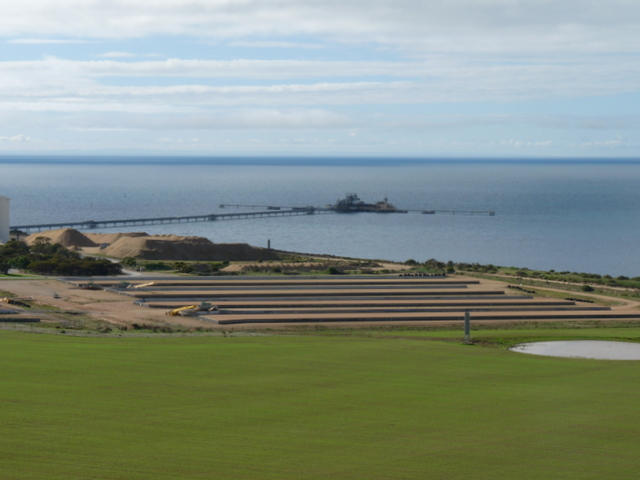
Grain handling jetty

== History ==
The Aboriginal Australian people who are the traditional owners of the land on which Ardrossan was developed were the Narungga people. They comprised four clans sharing the Guuranda (the Yorke Peninsula): Kurnara in the north, Dilpa in the south, Wari in the west and Windarra in the east.

The first European settlers after the British colonisation of South Australia were pastoralists who established sheep runs. Pastoral Lease No. 232, comprising 27 square miles (70 km^{2}), was taken up in 1852 by William Sharples. Stretching along the coastline, this was known as Parara (or Parrana/Pirana), meaning "middle" in the Narungga language, with the homestead near Parara Landing, about 3 kilometres (1.9 mi) south of present Ardrossan. Northward of Ardrossan are coastal springs, named Tiddy Widdy or Tittiwitti by the Narungga, being a scarce natural source of fresh water in this region.

In 1859 partners Parker Bowman (1831–1911) and Edmund Parnell (c.1834–87) took over the Parara leases. After these expired in 1865 the government moved toward establishing closer settlement and grain farming.

The Hundred of Cunningham was proclaimed on 19 June 1873, comprising 134 square miles (350 km^{2}), and surveying commenced. The Hundred had two government surveyed towns, namely Ardrossan, proclaimed 13 November 1873, and Price, proclaimed 3 August 1882.

Being at a site formerly known as Clay Gully, after a deep gully leading to its red clay coastal cliffs, the surveyed town of Ardrossan was named by Governor Fergusson after the Ardrossan seaport in Scotland which shared similar geography – "ard" meaning a height, and "ros" prominent rock or headland.

The site was largely chosen because of its potential for shipping infrastructure, allowing wheat farmers to ship their produce across the Gulf St Vincent to Port Adelaide. The residents of the new township petitioned the government for a jetty in 1874. Completed in 1877, this was later extended to better accommodate the larger steamships and windjammers used to export grain overseas. By 1878 there were six houses, a post office, a flour mill, a Methodist church, and a hotel. That same year a public school opened, having 53 pupils.

During the late 1800s, and into the early 20th century, the town expanded steadily due to income from the surrounding farms. As well, it became notable as the location of Clarence Smith's factory where he manufactured the Stump-jump plough between 1880 and 1935. This South Australian invention was vital in opening mallee country throughout Australia to the plough.

=== 20th century ===
Although the surrounding grain farmers continued to prosper, there was little change in the size of the town during the early 1900s. After the depression in the 1930s, the town and its businesses were largely stagnant until a large open-cut dolomite mine was opened by BHP in the 1950s for use at its Whyalla Steelworks on the Eyre Peninsula and Port Kembla in New South Wales. A new 1-kilometre (3,300 ft) long jetty was added and at the same time construction was started with grain storage silos. The "new" jetty currently services ships loading dolomite, grain and salt from the solar salt pans at Price, located approximately 10 kilometres (6.2 mi). The wharf is located 1.5 kilometres (0.93 mi) south of the town jetty, and can accommodate vessels of Handymax class.

The wharf was being considered for the future export of iron ore and copper concentrates by Rex Minerals Ltd in 2013.

== Governance ==
Ardrossan is in the local government area of Yorke Peninsula Council, the state electoral district of Narungga and the federal division of Grey.

== Flora and fauna ==
The coast and water bodies of Ardrossan bear populations of water-fowl, sea and shorebirds, and support migratory waders during their summer visitations.

Portunus pelagicus, or blue swimmer crabs, are plentiful between September and April.

=== Sperm whale stranding ===
South Australia's only recorded group stranding of sperm whales occurred on Parara Beach about 4 kilometres (2.5 mi) south of Ardrossan on 8 December 2014. Seven dead or dying whales were discovered stranded in the intertidal zone south of the BHP jetty. Six of the whales were located in a loose group along several hundred metres of shoreline, with another whale located further to the north. The South Australian museum announced that it would sample the bodies and attempt to collect a complete skeleton for the museum, commencing work on 10 December. Biopsy samples were formally taken from five of the whales by Australian Marine Wildlife Research & Rescue Organisation (AMWRRO) for analysis on 9 December. AMWRRO rejected the proposition that any whales featured propeller strike marks, claiming that the marks they observed were tooth-raking marks, resulting from behavior more commonly known to occur among orcas. Several teeth were illegally removed from the animals overnight on 8 December.

== Windara Reef ==
Windara Reef is as of 2021 Australia's largest oyster reef restoration project, and the largest outside of the United States. The name "Windara" refers to the Narungga name for the area where the reef is located. It is situated about 7 kilometres (4.3 mi) south of Ardrossan, near Rogues Point, at a depth of about 8 to 10 metres.

Oyster reefs, mostly created by Australian flat oysters, once spread along 1,500 kilometres (930 mi) of coastline in South Australia, but by the 21st century, there were none left. Since the British colonisation of South Australia, the waters have been subject to overfishing (and in particular dredging the sea floor, which destroys the oyster beds), water pollution and disease.

The project was undertaken with collaborating partners Yorke Peninsula Council, The Nature Conservancy, state government, federal government, the University of Adelaide and RecFishSA. It also received funding assistance from the Ian Potter Foundation. Stage 1 of the project was completed in June 2017, with work on Stage 2, involving the addition of 11,000 square metres (120,000 sq ft) reef over 16 hectares (40 acres), completed in September 2018. More than 7 million juvenile Australian flat oysters were placed on the reef's foundation.

The native oysters improve marine biodiversity: the adults are able to filter in excess of 100 litres (22 imp gal; 26 US gal) litres of water a day, and excrete a nutrient-rich substance which provides food for small shellfish, that in turn are food for larger fish. Through this process, the native oyster reefs can drive greater fish production than other types of artificial reefs.

== Industry ==
Grain farming and pastoralism continue to be a mainstay of the local economy.

The existing dolomite mine and jetty are currently owned and operated by Arrium (formerly Onesteel).

=== Tourism ===
Tourism plays an increasingly large part in Ardrossan's economy, with the town being a popular destination for Adelaide residents on weekends. While it lacks an attractive swimming beach, it is a popular location to catch fish and blue swimmer crabs, and the new Windara Reef is open to recreational fishers.

The town's two jetties are also suitable for scuba-diving, with easy entries and plentiful marine life to observe.

=== Shipwrecks ===
The historic shipwreck of the Zanoni is located approximately 24 kilometres (15 mi) offshore and used to be a popular fishing location. This ship originally sank on 11 February 1867 and was discovered on 17 April 1983 after 116 years. It is one of the best preserved examples of 19th century merchant sailing vessels in Australia. However, a protected area was declared in May 1983, which included a radius of 550 metres (1,800 ft) around the Zanoni. After this, boating and diving activities in the area require a permit.

In order to provide a recreational alternative, the then Department of Fisheries acquired a disused hopper barge from the Department of Marine and Harbours, and scuttled it on 11 April 1984 in order to create a new artificial reef, about one nautical mile south of the wreck of the Zanoni. The barge, known as the No. 5 Barge, the Ardrossan Barge or the Zanoni Barge, is now the only vessel within the Ardrossan ships' graveyard.

=== Oyster farming ===
Windara Reef (see above) is both a boost to ecotourism and a to jobs, through development of a new "blue economy". However, commercial fishing, anchoring, spearfishing, and the removal of animals and plants such as crabs, oysters, sea urchins, and seaweed from the reef are not allowed.

== Climate ==
Ardrossan, like most of the Yorke Peninsula, has a maritime climate. Summers are warm and winters are mild (although mornings and nights tend to be cool/cold) and usually wet.

== Media ==
The Ardrossan News (3 February – 7 July 1911) was briefly printed for the town by Thomas Corrigan in Port Wakefield.

== Gallery ==
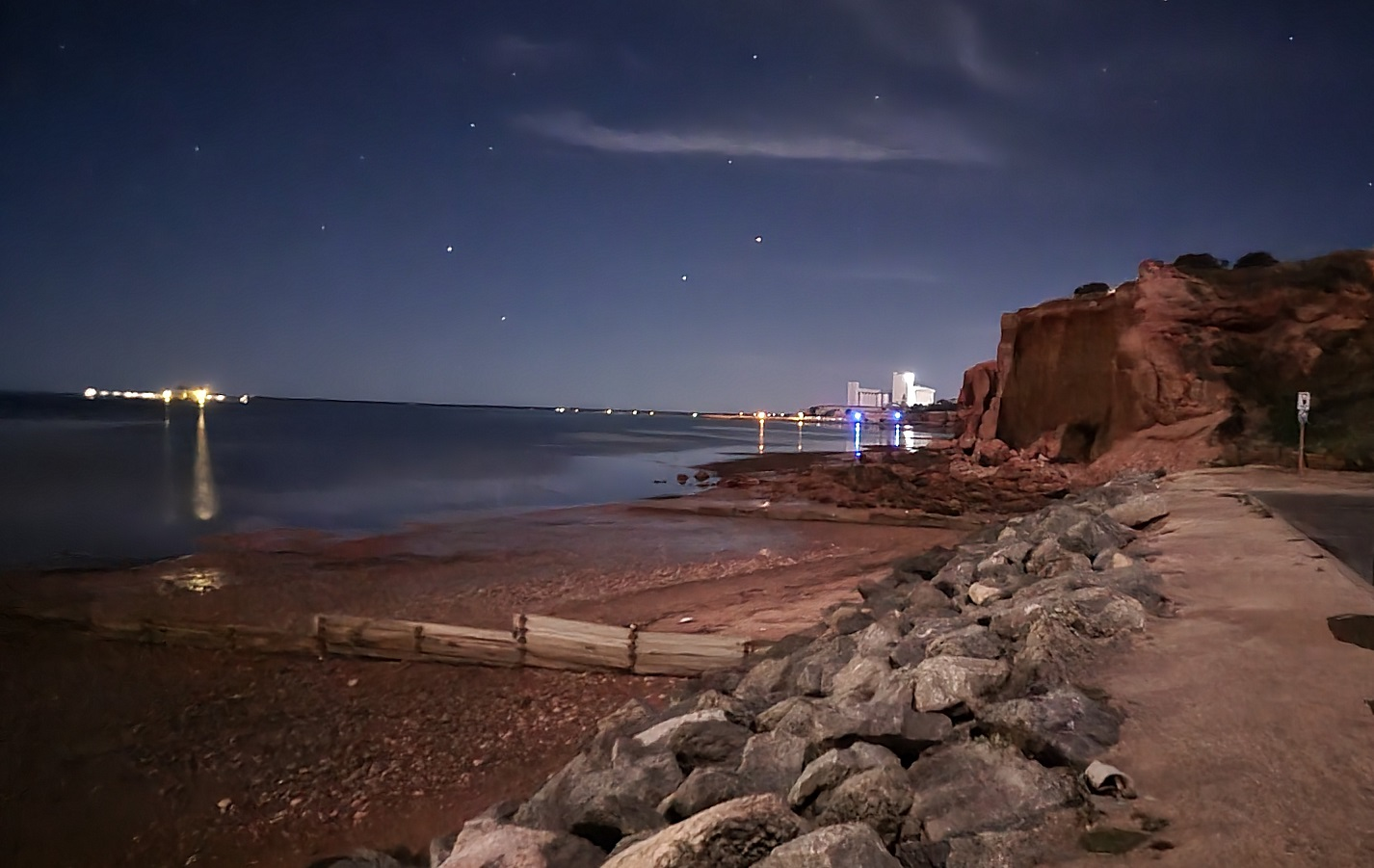
Ardrossan coastline at night

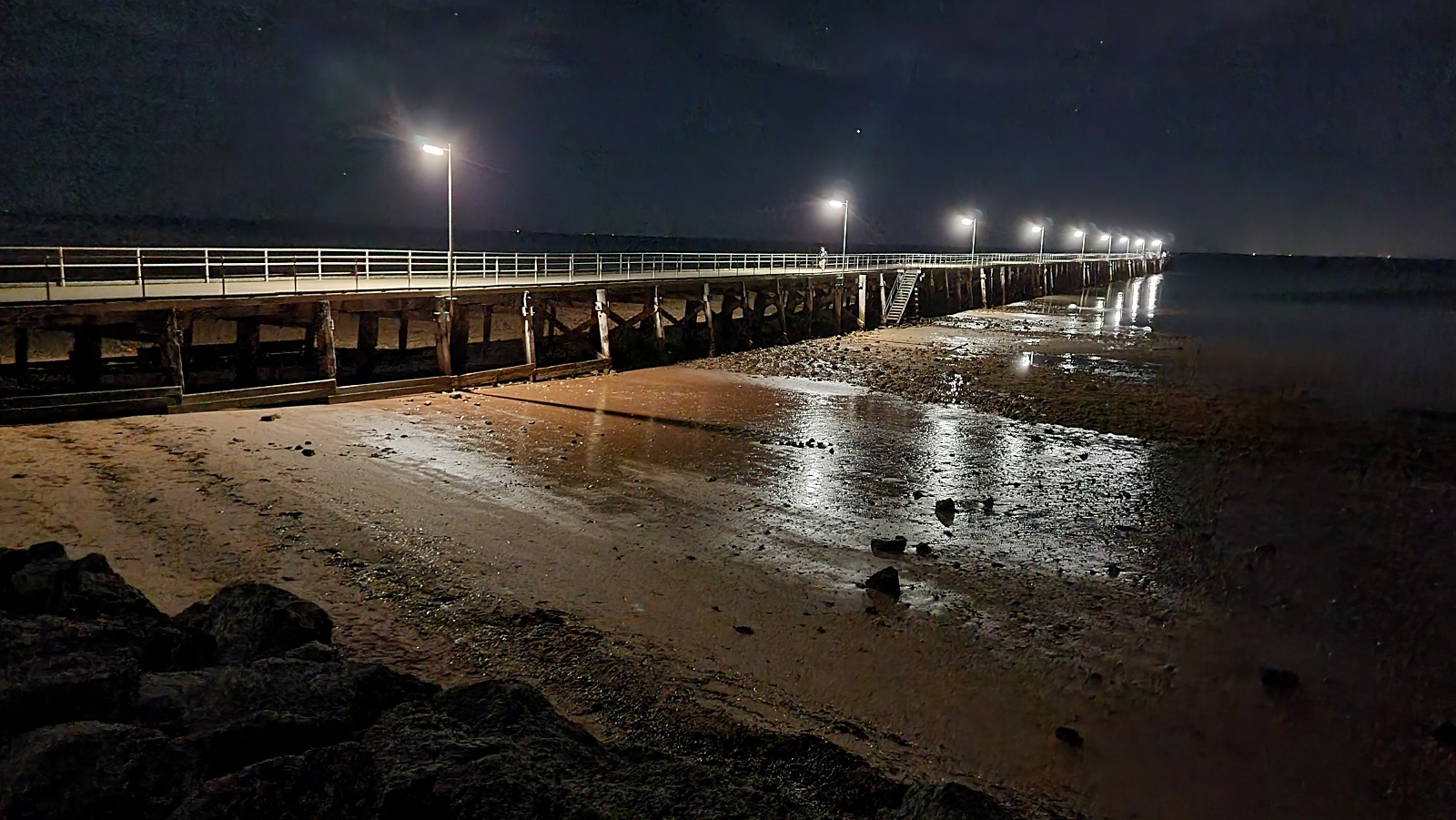
Ardrossan jetty at night

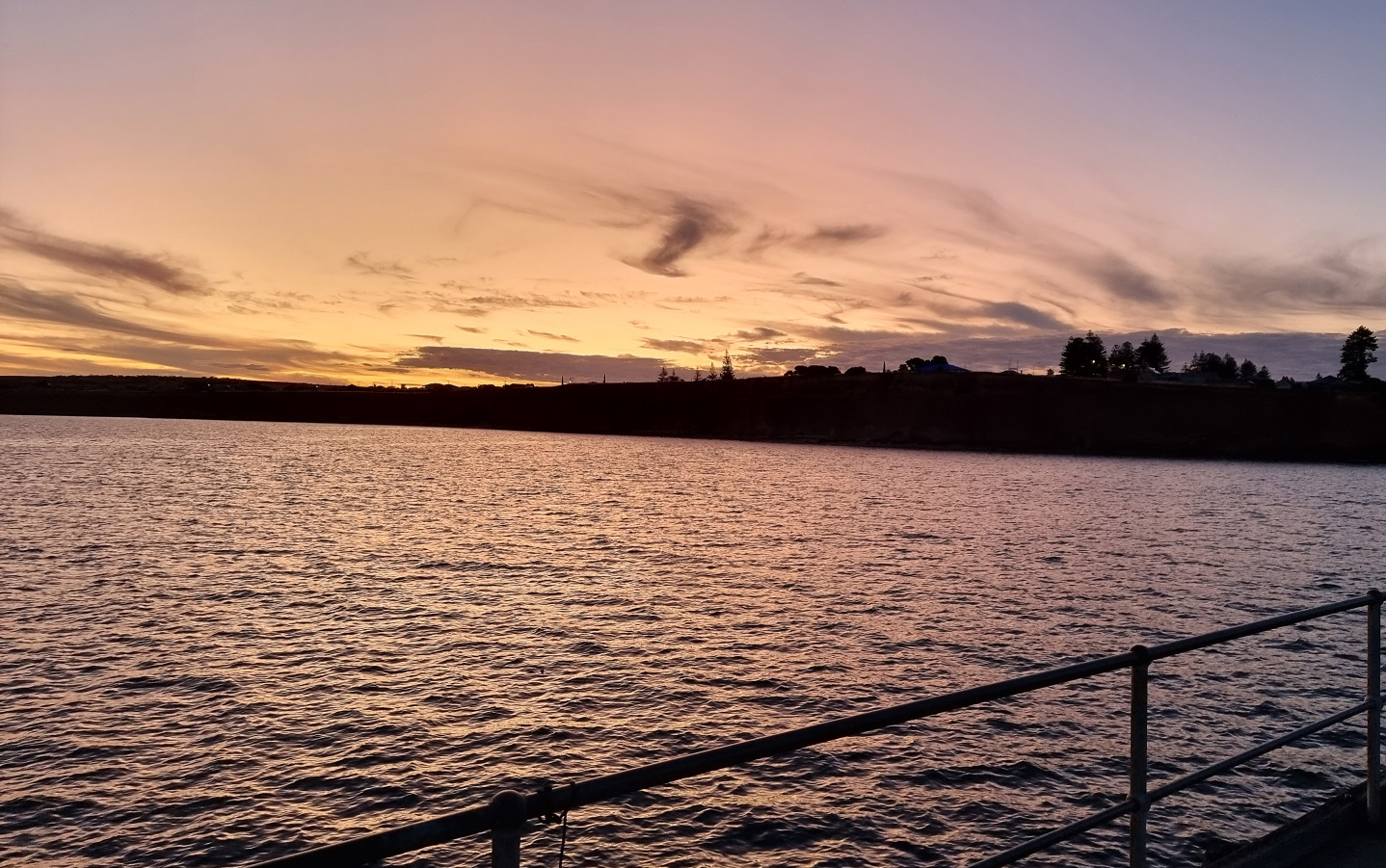
Ardrossan sunset

== Notable residents ==
- Clarence Herbert Smith
- Sam Jacobs, AFL footballer
- Caleb Poulter, AFL footballer

== See also ==
- List of cities and towns in South Australia
