= Gulf St Vincent =

Inlet in South Australia

Coordinates: 35°S 138°E

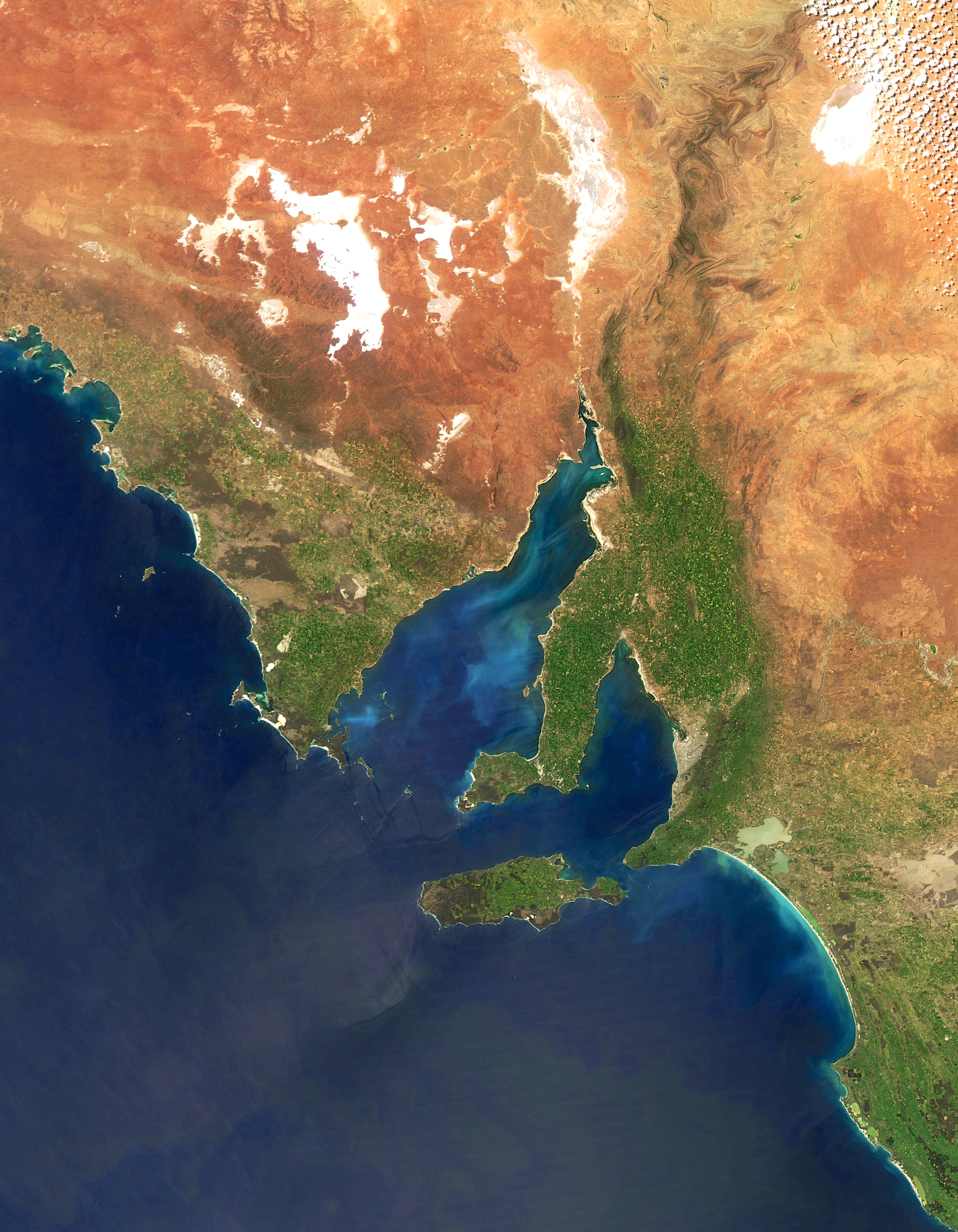
- Gulf St Vincent is the easternmost of the two inlets

- Location within South Australia
- Location: Australia
- Type: Gulf
- River sources: Bungala, Dry Creek, Field, Gawler, Gilbert, Light, Little Para River, Onkaparinga, Patawalonga, Port, Sturt, Torrens, Wakefield
- Basin countries: Australia
- Max. length: 138.9 km (86.3 mi)
- Max. width: 61.15 km (38.00 mi)
- Surface area: 6,800 km^{2} (2,600 sq mi)
- Average depth: 21 m (69 ft)
- Max. depth: 40 m (130 ft)
- Islands: Garden Island; Troubridge Island; Torrens Island
- Settlements: Adelaide

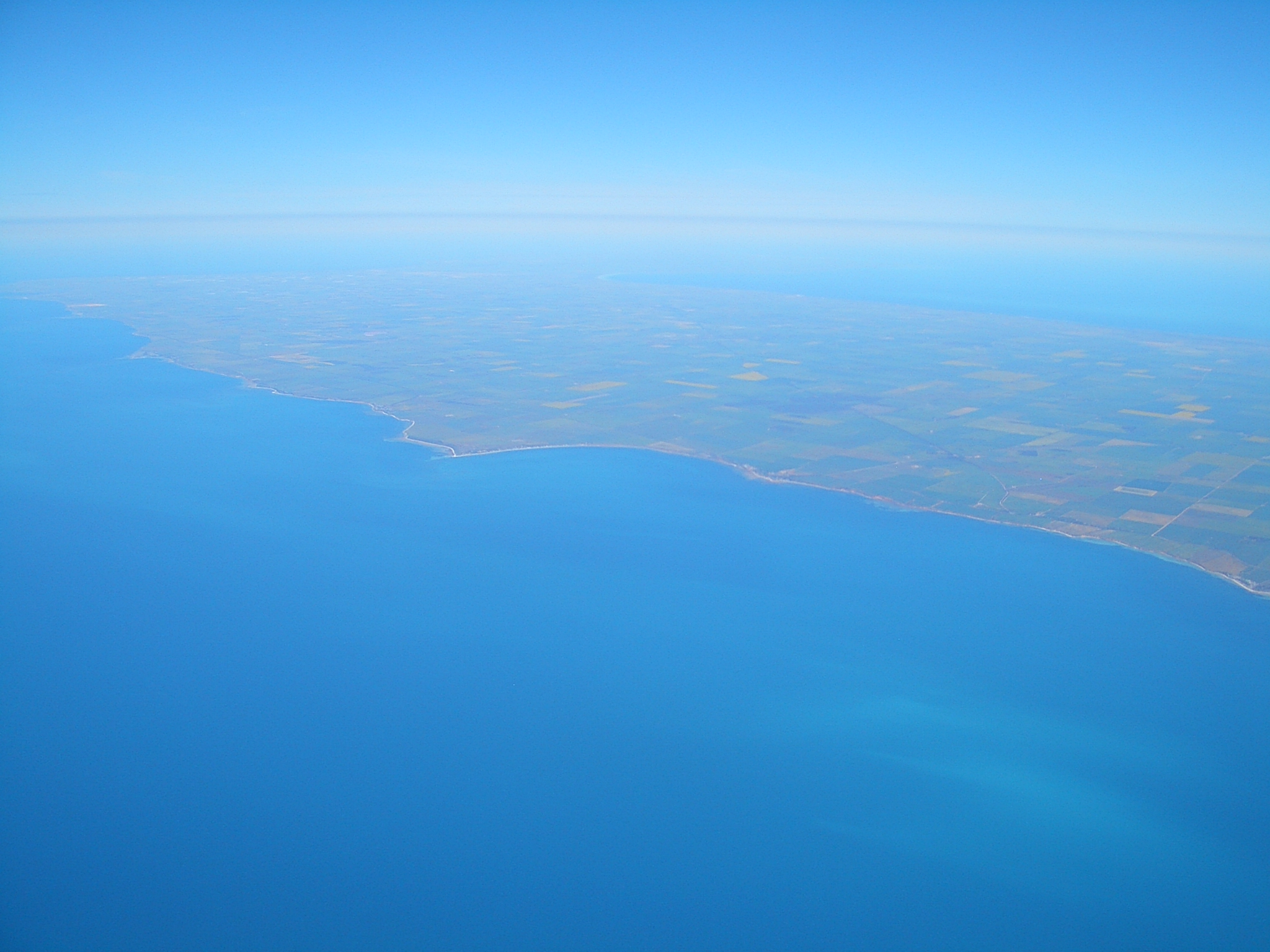
Gulf St Vincent (foreground) and Yorke Peninsula, facing south west

Gulf St Vincent, sometimes referred to as St Vincent Gulf, St Vincent's Gulf or Gulf of St Vincent, is the eastern of two large inlets of water on the southern coast of Australia, in the state of South Australia, the other being the larger Spencer Gulf, from which it is separated by Yorke Peninsula. On its eastern side the gulf is bordered by the Adelaide Plains and the Fleurieu Peninsula.

== Description ==
The St Vincent basin is formed from Cenozoic sediments deposited over, and surrounded by, Proterozoic and Paleozoic rock. Around 55 million years ago Gondwanaland broke up and Australia separated from Antarctica, causing a number of basins to form along the southern Australian coastline. Around 40 million years ago a number of blocks formed with the Mount Lofty Ranges rising to the east of the St Vincent basin. At the end of the Last Glacial Maximum around 10,000-15,000 years ago, the sea levels rose and covered the St. Vincent basin.

== Location ==
To the south it is defined by a line from Troubridge Point on Yorke Peninsula to Cape Jervis on Fleurieu Peninsula. Its entrances from the southwest are from Investigator Strait, and to the southeast from Backstairs Passage, which separate Kangaroo Island from the mainland. Adelaide lies midway along the gulf's east shore. Other towns located on the gulf include, from west to east, Edithburgh, Stansbury, Port Vincent and Ardrossan on the west coast, and Port Wakefield and Normanville on the east coast.

== History ==
The Aboriginal name given to it by the original inhabitants of the area, the Kaurna people was Wongajerla, also spelt Wongga Yerlo or Wonggayerlo, meaning "western sea".

It was named Gulph of St. Vincent by Matthew Flinders on 30 March 1802, in honour of Admiral John Jervis (1st Earl of St Vincent) who won a naval victory off Cape St. Vincent, Portugal. It was shortly afterwards (after his meeting with Flinders at Encounter Bay on 8 April 1802) mapped by Nicolas Baudin, who named it Golfe de la Mauvaise or Golfe de la Misanthrophie. In the following year Louis de Freycinet renamed it Golphe Josephine to honour Josephine Bonaparte.

Due to Flinders' lengthy imprisonment on Mauritius during his return to England, the publication of Baudin's map preceded that of Flinders by three years.

The Adelaide Desalination Plant which is located on Gulf St Vincent's eastern shore in Lonsdale, supplies the Adelaide metropolitan area with desalinated water from the gulf. It officially opened in 2013.

== Environment ==
The Gulf teems with crustacea and polychaeta, as well as various species of sea squirts and sea urchins. The benthos is a soft sediment shelf, with species of zosteraceae around the mouth of the Port River. The cardinalfish genus Vincentia takes its name from Gulf St Vincent where the type specimen of its type species was collected.

== Gallery ==
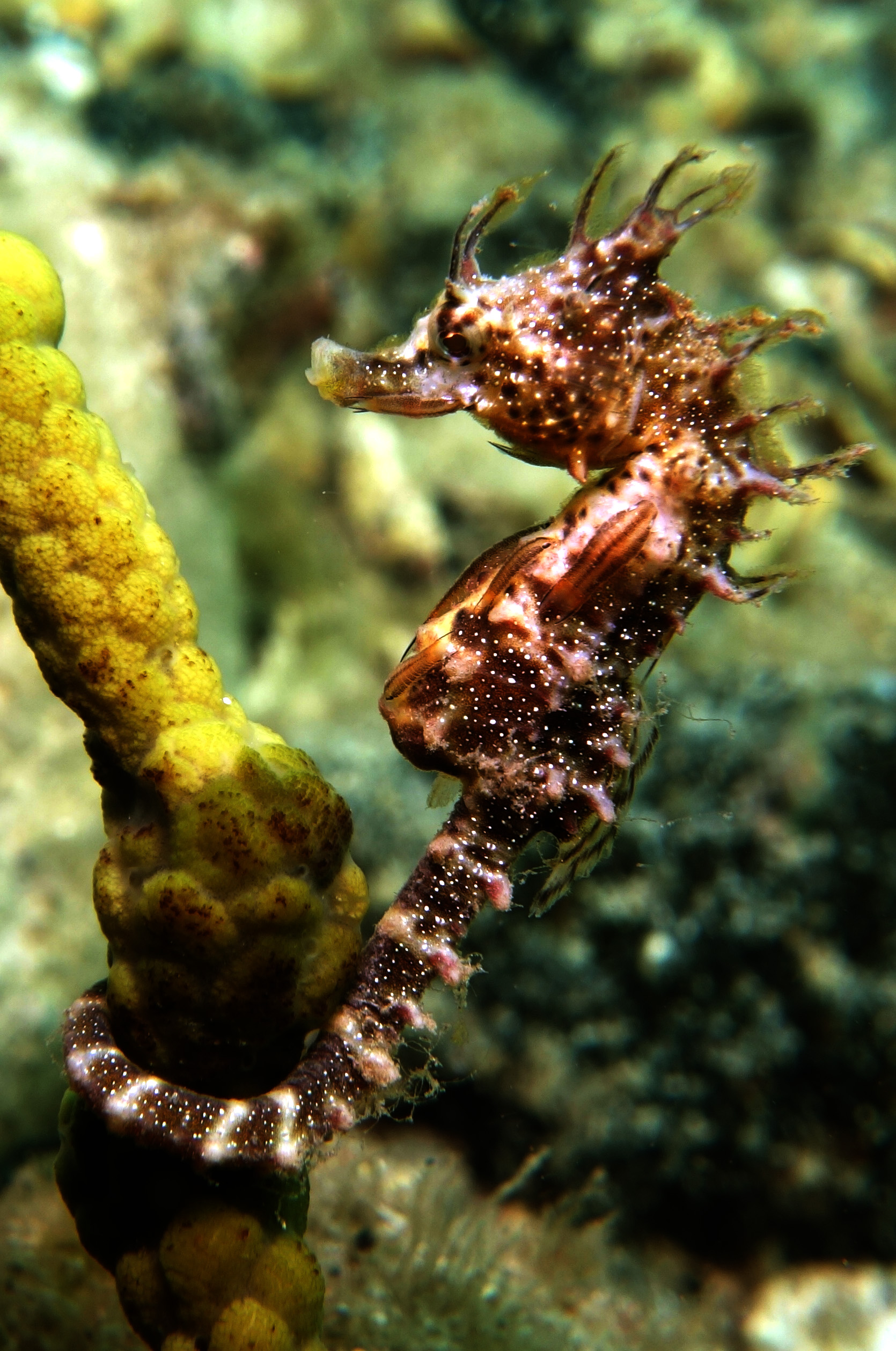
Seahorse beneath Edithburgh Jetty

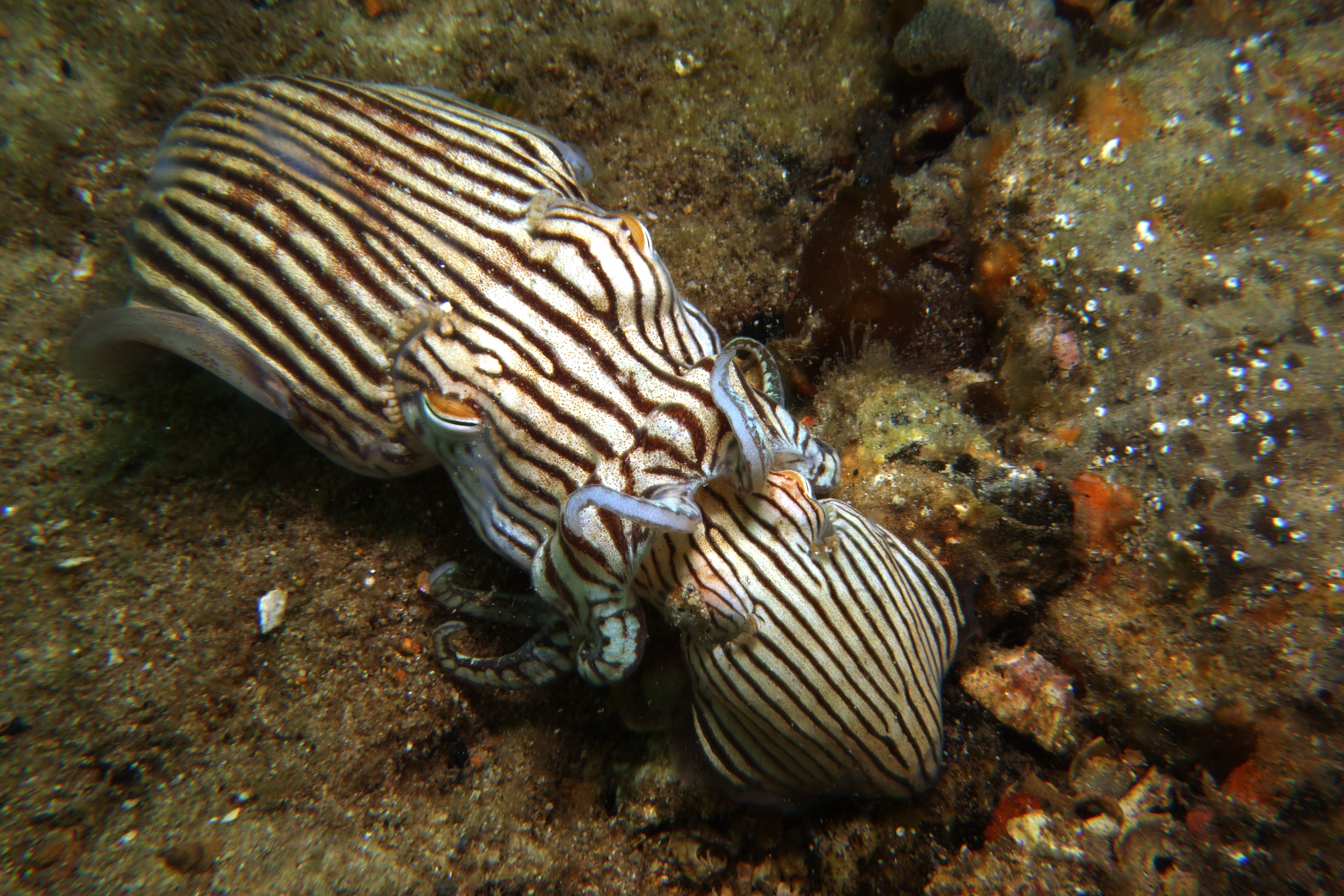
Striped Pyjama squid mating under Edithburgh jetty

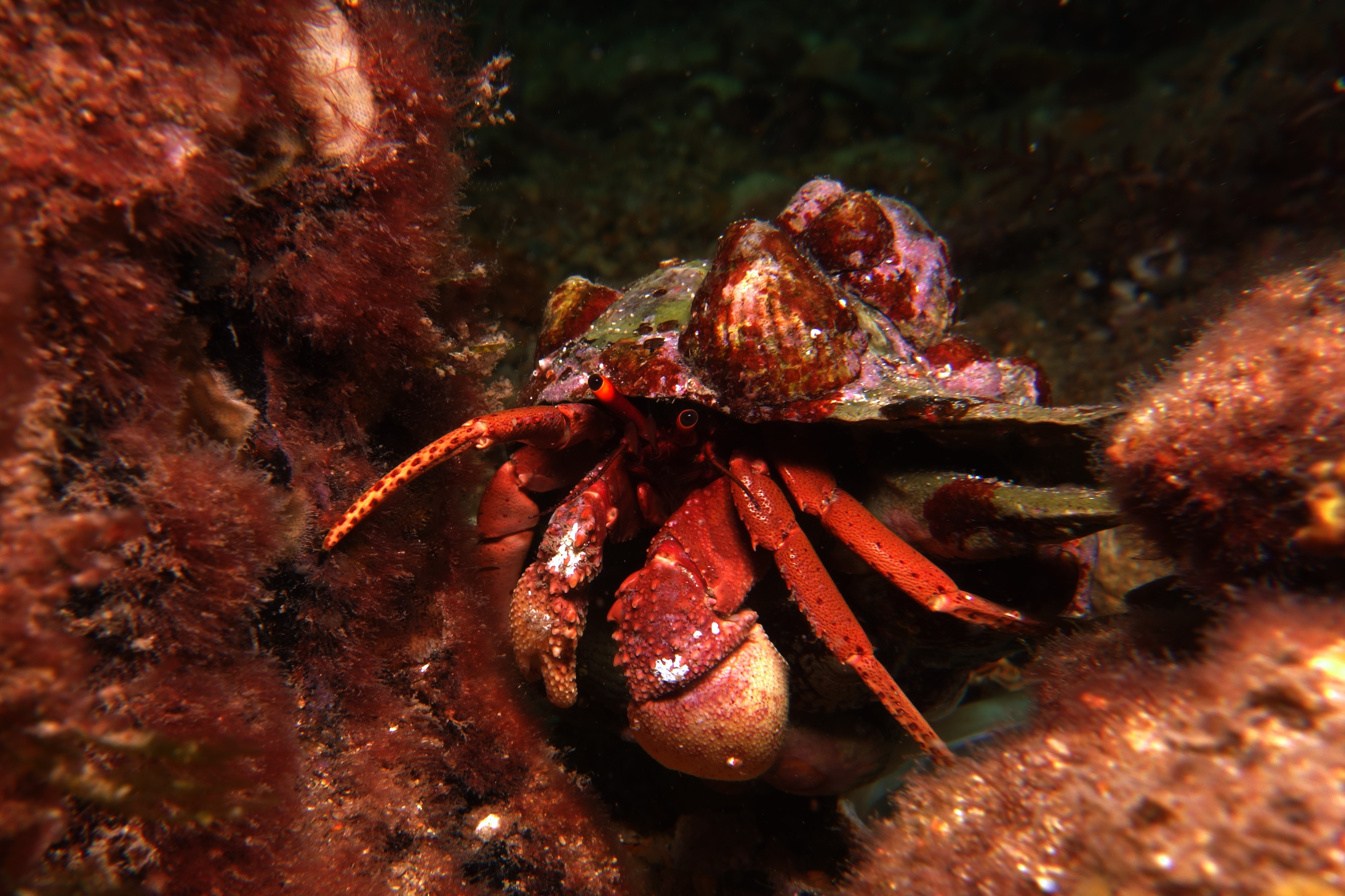
Hermit crab beneath Edithburgh jetty

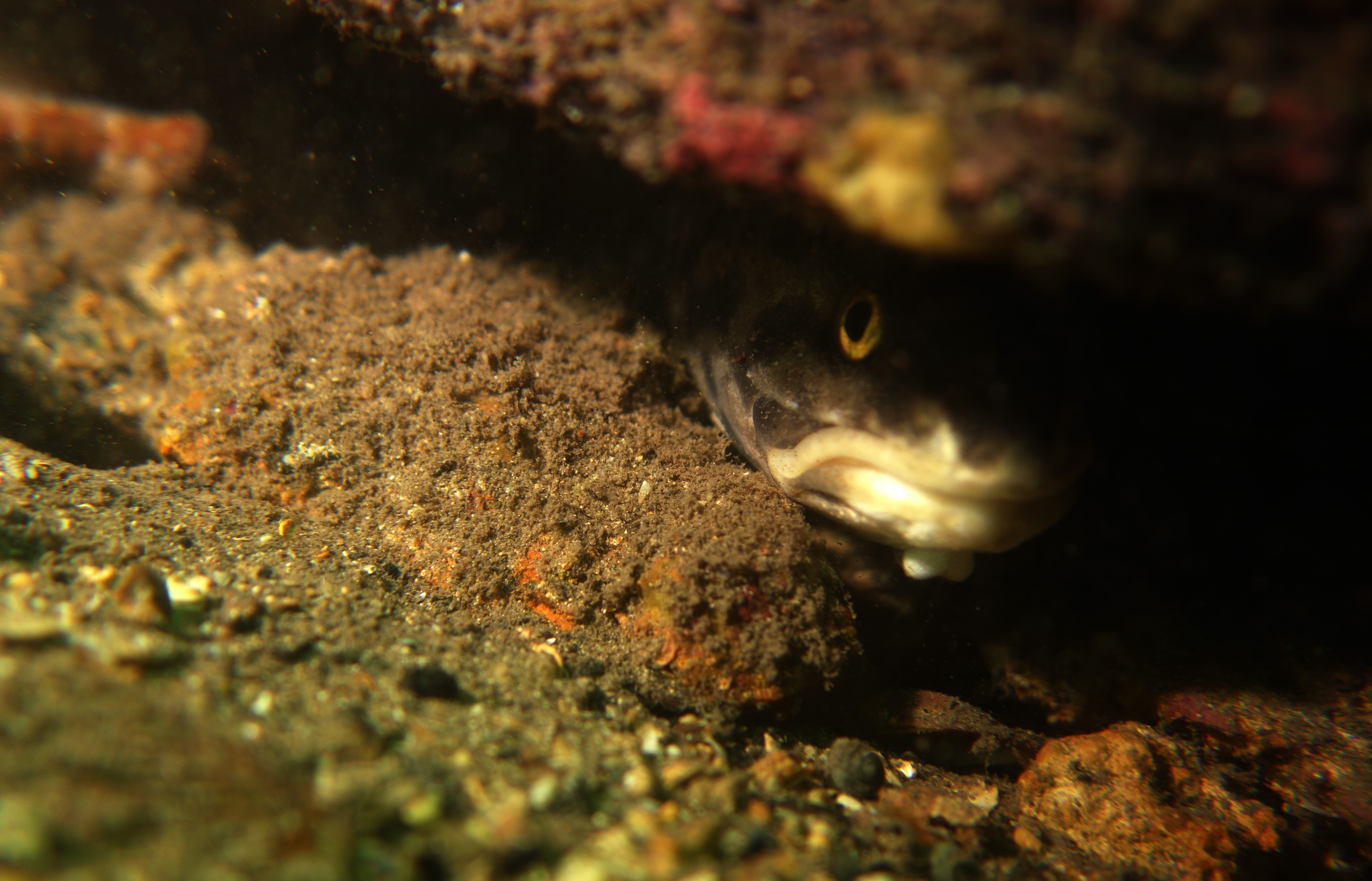
Rock ling beneath Edithburgh jetty

== See also ==
- Gulf St Vincent Important Bird Area
