= Tilt Renewables =

Australian utilities company

Tilt Renewables Pty Ltd
- Type: Private company
- Industry: Energy
- Founded: 2016
- Headquarters: Melbourne, Australia
- Services: Electricity
- Website: tiltrenewables.com

Tilt Renewables Pty Ltd is an Australian electricity generation company. It was previously dual listed on the New Zealand stock exchange and Australian stock exchange. In 2021, the Powering Australian Renewables Fund merged with Tilt Renewables following a complex acquisition and merger, making it the largest private developer and generator of renewable electricity in Australia.

== History ==
=== Establishment and pre-takeover ===
In October 2016, Tilt Renewables was demerged from Trustpower, with Tilt Renewables taking ownership of all operational wind assets and the wind and solar development pipeline, and Trustpower retaining all hydro assets. Tilt Renewables was dual listed on the ASX and NZX with the ticker TLT.

In December 2019, the Snowtown Wind Farm (Stage 2) was sold to Palisade Investment Partners.

On 15 March 2021, a takeover was announced with support from the largest shareholders and independent board members. The proposed scheme of arrangement would be worth A$2.75 billion by a consortium where the New Zealand assets would be taken over by Mercury NZ and the Australian assets by Powering Australian Renewables Fund (PowAR) – itself a consortium of AGL Energy, QIC Global Infrastructure Fund and the Australian Government's Future Fund.

=== Post-takeover ===
In August 2021, Tilt Renewables scheme of arrangement was implemented. PowAR took over the Australian assets and operations of the former Tilt Renewables, making it the largest private developer and generator of wind and solar electricity in Australia. The combined Australian organisation was subsequently renamed back to Tilt Renewables. It holds the assets of both former entities, and was owned 40% by QIC, 40% Future Fund and 20% AGL until November 2025 when AGL sold 19.9% of its 20% stake to QIC and Future Fund.

== Generation assets ==
Below is the list of currently generating assets owned by Tilt Renewables

Station	Type	Capacity (MW)	Annual Output (GWh)	Commissioned	Location
Snowtown Wind Farm (Stage 1)	Wind	98		2008	South Australia
Crookwell Wind Farm	Wind	5	8	1998	Crookwell, New South Wales
Blayney Wind Farm	Wind	10	18	2000	Blayney, New South Wales
Salt Creek Wind Farm	Wind	54	172	2018	Woorndoo, Victoria
Dundonnell Wind Farm	Wind	336		2022	Victoria
Coopers Gap Wind Farm	Wind	453			Queensland
Silverton Wind Farm	Wind	199			New South Wales
Broken Hill Solar Plant	Solar	53			New South Wales
Nyngan Solar Plant	Solar	102			New South Wales
Rye Park Wind Farm	Wind	396		2025	New South Wales

== Developments ==
Below is list of the upcoming development pipeline for Tilt Renewables

Station	Type	Capacity (MW)	Location
Waddi Wind and Solar Farm	Wind/Solar	≤145 (Wind), ≤50 (Solar)	Western Australia
Palmer Wind Farm	Wind	≤375	South Australia
Western Downs Solar Farm	Solar	≤250	Western Downs, Queensland
Snowtown North Solar Farm	Solar	≤045	Snowtown, South Australia
Dysart Solar Farm	Solar	≤100	Dysart, Queensland
Highbury Pumped Hydro Energy Storage (cancelled)	Pumped Hydro Storage	≤300, 1350MWh storage capacity	Highbury, South Australia

== See also ==
- Electricity sector in Australia
- List of renewable energy companies by country
- National Electricity Market
