= 4G connectivity in Australia =

In telecommunications, 4G is the fourth generation of cell phone mobile communications standards. It is a successor to the third generation (3G) standards. A 4G system provides mobile "ultra-broadband" Internet access. Major Australian telecommunications companies (colloquially known as "telcos"), and most resellers that use one of these major telcos, have been rolling out and continuing to upgrade 4G since 2011/2012.

== Networks ==
Operator	Frequency (MHz)	Band	Duplex mode	Notes	Available Spectrum	Currently Operating
Optus	700	28	FDD	Currently being rolled out nationwide	10 MHz	Yes
Optus	1800	3	FDD	Currently operating in Brisbane, Sydney, Newcastle, Perth, Melbourne and Adelaide	up to 15 MHz	Yes
Optus	2100	1	FDD	Currently used in Darwin, Cairns, Hobart and the Sunshine Coast	up to 20 MHz	Yes
Optus	2300	40	TDD	First Deployment in Canberra with possible extensions to other capital cities by reusing current Vivid Wireless frequency.	up to 98 MHz	Yes
Optus	2600	7	FDD	Being rolled out nationwide.	20 MHz	Yes
Optus	3500	42	TDD	Currently being deployed nationwide as a 5G band	Unknown	No
Telstra	700	28	FDD	Currently used in major cities and branded as the 4GX Network.	20 MHz	Yes
Telstra	900	8	FDD	Refarmed 2G Bandwidth used for with the 1800 MHz network for carrier aggregation.	5 MHz	Yes
Telstra	1800	3	FDD	Currently operating in Australian capital cities and regional centres.	10 to 20 MHz	Yes
Telstra	2100	1	FDD	Operating at selected locations where Telstra has the frequency from the previous 3Telstra partnership.	10 to 20 MHz	Yes
Telstra	2600	7	FDD	Expected to be replaced by 5G	40 MHz	Yes
Vodafone	850	5	FDD	Rolled out nationwide.	10 MHz in capital cities, 5 MHz in regional areas.	Yes
Vodafone	1800	3	FDD	Operating in metro areas and some regional areas.	up to 30 MHz	Yes
Vodafone	2100	1	FDD	Rolled out in metro areas and some regional areas.	5 or 10 MHz	Yes
National Broadband Network Fixed Wireless	2300	40	TDD	Used in regional location only to provide the Fixed Wireless service	Unknown	Yes
National Broadband Network Fixed Wireless	3500	42	TDD	Not as widely deployed as Band 40 but used in some locations only to provide the Fixed Wireless service	Unknown	Yes

- after analogue TV is switched off and digital TV is re-stacked.

=== Carrier Aggregation ===
==== Optus ====
In September 2014, Optus launched LTE Carrier Aggregation in Sydney, Melbourne, Brisbane and Adelaide. Optus markets LTE Carrier Aggregation as "4G Plus". Optus combines two 20 MHz channels of 2.3 GHz spectrum.

In Brisbane, Optus has up to 4CA band combinations using Band 1, 3, 7, 28.

==== Telstra ====
At the end of September 2014, Telstra has opted not to extend combined 900 MHz and 1800 MHz Carrier Aggregation service.

In November 2014, Telstra launched LTE Carrier Aggregation (marketed as 4GX) in parts of Sydney, Adelaide, Perth, Darwin and ten regional centres (Albany, Ulladulla, Murray Bridge, Narrawallee, Shepparton, Batemans Bay, Swansea, Bunbury, Port Macquarie and Chinchilla), bringing to 26 the number of communities with the service. The operator wants to bring "4GX" to at least 50 regional centres by New Year's Day. Telstra combines 20 MHz of 700 MHz spectrum and 20 MHz of 1.8 GHz spectrum.

==== Vodafone ====
Since 2015, Vodafone has offered carrier aggregation across its main 4G bands, 850 MHz and 1800 MHz.

=== VoLTE ===
Voice over LTE (VoLTE) is a 4G technology for making voice calls. It was first introduced to Australia in September 2015 by Telstra. Since the shutdown of the 3G network by Vodafone in December 2023 and by Telstra and Optus in October 2024, VoLTE and voice over NR (VoNR) have been the only way to make a cellular voice call in Australia.

==== Telstra ====
Telstra was the first carrier in Australia to launch VoLTE. The service was initially available on 6 phones (Four being iPhones and two being Samsung Galaxy's). Telstra have switched on the VoLTE on every one of their 4G networks across Australia. The VoLTE network is said to be clearer and provide up to 5 way voice calls.

==== Optus ====
Optus commenced the rollout of VoLTE across its 4G Plus mobile network in Australia's major capital cities in May 2016.
The Samsung Galaxy S7 and Galaxy S7 Edge were the first devices available with Optus VoLTE, with more devices added in the future. Optus postpaid consumer and SMB customers in Sydney, Melbourne, Brisbane, Adelaide, Perth and Canberra CBD metros areas will be among the first to see the rollout of VoLTE.

==== Vodafone ====
Vodafone conducted VoLTE trials in early 2015.

== Frequencies ==
=== 700 MHz ===
The 700 MHz band was previously used for analogue television and became operational with 4G in December 2014.

==== Optus ====
Optus announced trials of its 4G 700 MHz network in Darwin and Perth CBDs on 21 July 2014.
The 700 mhz network was made active on January 1, 2015.

==== Telstra ====
In July 2014 Telstra announced a trial of 4G services in the 700 MHz spectrum in Perth, Fremantle, Esperance, Mildura, Mount Isa and Griffith. Service launched in November 2014. This band is the basis for the '4GX' brand.

==== Vodafone ====
Vodafone acquired some residual spectrum on this band. Their license commences on 1 April 2018.

=== 850 MHz ===
The 850 MHz band was operated as a 3G network by Telstra and as a 4G network by Vodafone.

Vodafone switched on the 4G 850 network on in Adelaide on 6 October 2014. By the end of 2014 all other capital cities were switched over to 4G, and in Q2 2016 all regional sites were activated on 4G on this band.

Telstra has also turned off its 4G 850 MHz equipment and that spectrum will be refarmed for 4G &/or 5G purposes.

=== 1800 MHz ===
The 1800 MHz band is currently operated as a 4G network by Optus, Telstra and Vodafone. It had previously been used as in the 2G GSM network.

==== Optus ====
Optus has now installed their 4G networks in all the capital cities and thousands of regional areas, and markets that they currently cover 86% of the Australian population with their 4G Plus Network

==== Telstra ====
Telstra was the first mobile phone network to operate 4G and 2G in the same band. Their 4G network covers capital cities and some regional areas.

==== Vodafone ====
The Vodafone 4G network was first to live in selected metro areas of Sydney, Melbourne, Perth, Adelaide and Brisbane, and the outer metro areas of Wollongong, Gold Coast, Newcastle and Geelong from June 12, 2013. The 1800 MHz network has since been expanded to include all capital cities and major outer metro areas, and a rollout has begun for some regional areas.

=== 2100 MHz ===
This band is commonly used for 3G services on Telstra and Optus, with only a very limited rollout on 4G. Vodafone have begun completely refarming their 2100 MHz coverage from 3G to 4G.

==== Telstra ====
Telstra utilises its 2100MHz spectrum as a 4G capacity layer where it has compatible equipment installed.

==== Vodafone ====
Since 2015, Vodafone have offered limited coverage using 5 MHz of Band 1 (2100 MHz) spectrum in major regional cities. Starting in 2017, this coverage was increased by adding more locations with 10 MHz bandwidth in regional areas. From 2017 onwards, the 2100 MHz spectrum in metropolitan areas was reformed to 4G.

=== 2300 MHz ===
==== Optus ====
Optus use 2300 MHz TD-LTE (Band 40) in big cities such as Sydney, Melbourne, Brisbane, Adelaide and Canberra, plus selected metropolitan locations.
Optus first launched its TD-LTE network in Canberra in May 2013.

==== Telstra ====
Telstra mainly uses 2300 MHz (Band 40) for Private Customer networks mainly at remote Mine sites.

=== 2600 MHz ===
==== Optus ====
Optus and Telstra trialled the 2600 MHz frequency in Australia. The service was launched in October 2014.

==== Telstra ====
Telstra uses 2600 MHz frequency band for 4G & 5G services.

==== TPG ====
TPG had initially surprised some by bidding in the auction as they had no infrastructure at the time. On 30 September 2015 TPG signed a deal with Vodafone Australia to gain access to Vodafone base stations. In return, TPG will provide Dark Fibre to Vodafone towers and also move their current mobile subscribers from the Optus network over to the Vodafone network.

== 4G sites (base stations) ==
As of 31 January 2024:

- Optus has approximately 9,201 4G base stations in Australia
- Telstra has approximately 11,707 4G base stations in Australia
- TPG Vodafone has approximately 5,712 4G base stations in Australia
- NBN has approximately 2,400 4G base stations in Australia

== Performance ==
In its latest State of Mobile Networks for Australia report, mobile analytics company OpenSignal put Telstra in the lead when it comes to delivering the fastest 4G download, upload and overall speeds. Optus has Australia's most available 4G network, thanks to its LTE rollout. OpenSignal reports its users were able to find an Optus LTE signal 90.5% of the time. Vodafone had the best 4G and overall download speeds in Melbourne and had the lowest 4G latency.

== Resellers ==
The following mobile virtual network operators offer 4G services in Australia:

Telstra subsidiaries and affiliates using Telstra's LTE network
Operator	Launch date	Notes
Aldi Mobile	6 March 2013	
Belong	October 2013	Telstra subsidiary.
Boost	1 August 2000	On the Optus network until 2012, acquired by Telstra in 2024.
Woolworths Everyday Mobile	2009	
Exetel	2004	
Lycamobile	23 November 2010	
MATE	?	
More	2023	
Superloop	2014	
Tangerine Telecom	2013	

Boost is the only Telstra MVNO with full access to the Telstra network; all others only have access to the Telstra Wholesale network, which is similar to Optus' network.

Optus subsidiaries and affiliates using Optus's LTE network
Operator	Launch date	Notes
ACN	May 2013	affiliate
amaysim	March 2015	subsidiary
Aussie Broadband	2008	
Bendigo Bank Telco	(?)	affiliate
Coles Mobile	2015	
Commander	November 2013	affiliate
Dodo Australia	2004	
Internode	July 2013	affiliate
iPrimus	1999	
Live Connected	April 2013	affiliate
Moose Mobile	May 2017	
Southern Phone	2002	
SpinTel	April 2013	affiliate
Startel	(?)	affiliate
Vaya Mobile	April 2013	affiliate
Yatango Mobile	May 2014	
Yomojo Mobile	November 2015	

Vodafone affiliates using Vodafone's LTE network
Operator	Launch date	Notes
felix Mobile	November 2020	
iiNet	September 2011	
Kogan Mobile	June 2016	affiliate
Lebara Mobile	2009	
TPG Telecom	September 2015	Affiliate; TPG owns Vodafone.

== 4G roaming ==
=== Telstra ===
In January 2013, Telstra launched LTE roaming in Hong Kong. Telstra partners with csl.

4G roaming from Telstra is now available in New Zealand, Singapore, Taiwan, Japan, Hong Kong, United Kingdom, Canada and the United States.

=== Vodafone ===
Vodafone has 4G roaming in the Czech Republic, Greece, Ireland, Italy, Netherlands, New Zealand, Portugal, Romania, Spain and the United Kingdom. Both prepaid and postpaid services can use 4G in those countries overseas.

=== Optus ===
Optus has 4G roaming switched on.

=== Vodafone ===
In mid-February 2014, Vodafone announced LTE roaming for New Zealand, UK and Europe. In August 2014, Vodafone launched LTE roaming for New Zealand.

== See also ==
- List of LTE networks
- List of mobile network operators of the Asia Pacific region
- Telecommunications in Australia
