= Cerebrovascular diseases in Australia =

Health issue in Australia

Disability-adjusted life year for cerebrovascular disease per 100,000 inhabitants in 2004. less than 250 250–425 425–600 600–775 775–950 950–1125 1125–1300 1300–1475 1475–1650 1650–1825 1825–2000 more than 2000

Cerebrovascular diseases in Australia are a major health issue. Cerebrovascular disease is a significant challenge to Australia due to it being a prominent cause of death in Australians and the difficulties it poses for carers and the health system in addition to individuals with cerebrovascular disease. Stroke is the deadliest cerebrovascular disease in Australia accounting for 84.24% of all deaths caused by cerebrovascular diseases. The death rate of cerebrovascular diseases is decreasing, with cerebrovascular disease in 2008-2018 falling from the third to fourth leading cause of death for men and second to third leading cause of death for women during this time period. In 2015, stroke was the tenth leading cause of burden of disease, accounting for 2.7% of the overall burden. This cause of disease burden has decreased from 2003 to 2015 with stroke falling from the second leading cause of disease burden to the tenth during this time period. Aboriginal and Torres Strait Islander people and people from low-socioeconomic areas experience higher rates of prevalence and mortality from stroke than non-Indigenous Australians.

Cerebrovascular diseases have significant economic impacts and social impacts on survivors and the Australian economy. In 2012, the cost of lost earnings due to decreased employment of working age stroke survivors was A$975 million and the cost of absenteeism for working stroke survivors was $1,138 billion. In the 2011 survey of Australian stroke survivors and their carers, stroke survivors with a partner or spouse experienced a deterioration of their relationship in 57% of cases, and 47% of stroke survivors’ carers who engaged in leisure activities experienced a moderate to severe reduction in their ability to partake in these activities after becoming a carer.

Due to the challenges cerebrovascular diseases pose to Australia, the Australian Government has allocated significant health expenditure to these diseases. The Medical Research Future Fund and National Health and Medical Research Council are two government-owned research bodies that have committed $220 million over 10 years into the Cardiovascular Health Mission, which includes the aim to reduce the prevalence of cardiovascular diseases, including stroke, in Australia. The University of Melbourne and Royal Melbourne Hospital received $1 million from these two research bodies to develop more effective early stroke diagnosis tools for air and road ambulances.

== Epidemiology ==
Epidemiology is the study of the occurrence and effects of a disease on a population, considering elements such as the mortality, sociodemographic features of the affected population, burden of disease, risk factors and morbidity.

Number of deaths with an underlying cause of cerebrovascular disease, by sex, 2009 to 2018
Year	Men	Women	Total
2009	4,512	6,704	11,216
2010	4,331	6,869	11,200
2011	4,424	6,821	11,245
2012	4,248	6,537	10,785
2013	4,172	6,371	10,543
2014	4,260	6,469	10,729
2015	4,365	6,502	10,867
2016	4,244	6,225	10,469
2017	4,302	5,884	10,186
2018	4,164	5,808	9,972

=== Mortality ===
In 2018, cerebrovascular diseases were the underlying cause of 9,972 deaths, accounting for 6.29% of all deaths, making it the third leading cause of death. From 2008-2018 the number of deaths caused by cerebrovascular diseases has decreased by 16.75% from 11,979 deaths to 9,972 deaths. In 2018 cerebrovascular diseases were the third leading cause of death for women and the fourth leading cause of death for men. Women experience a higher mortality rate from cerebrovascular diseases than men, with 58.24% of deaths from cerebrovascular diseases in 2018 being attributed to women.

In 2018, stroke was the underlying cause of 8,400 deaths, accounting for 5.3% of all deaths and 84.24% of deaths caused by cerebrovascular diseases. From 1980 to 2018 the death rates for stroke have fallen by 3.5% a year. For individuals aged 75 and over the rate of decline has remained constant but for individuals aged 55–74 it has slowed.

=== Morbidity ===
In 2018, the morbidity or prevalence of stroke was 387,000 people. The prevalence of stroke has fallen from 1.7% of people in 2003 to 1.3% of people in 2018. Stroke is more prevalent in men than women. In 2018, 55.3% of people living with the effects of stroke were men.

The incidence of stroke events in 2017 was 38,000 stroke events. The number of stroke events has fallen by 24% from 2001 to 2017 with the age standardised rate per 100,000 population decreasing from 169 to 129. This rate of decline in the incidence of stroke has been more significant in individuals aged 75 and older than those aged 55–74.

=== Burden of disease ===
In 2015, 2.7% of total burden of disease was attributed to stroke, making it the 10thlargest contributor to total disease burden. Burden of disease caused by stroke was more significant in individuals aged 85 and older, with stroke being the third leading cause of disease burden in this age group. Women experienced a greater burden of disease from stroke than men. Stroke accounted for 8.1% of disease burden in women and 6.6% of disease burden in men aged 85 and over. The total burden of disease caused by stroke has declined from 2003 to 2015 by 41%. During this time period, the fatal burden of disease declined by 42% and the non-fatal burden declined by 30%.

=== Determinants ===
Unmodifiable risk factors of cerebrovascular disease include age, gender and family history. The most significant modifiable risk factors of stroke are high blood pressure, high blood cholesterol, smoking and high alcohol consumption. In 2011, 73% of stroke patients had high blood pressure, 50% had high blood cholesterol, 31% were current or past smokers and 14% had high alcohol consumption.

=== Sociodemographic characteristics ===
==== Age ====
The number of deaths caused by cerebrovascular diseases increases with age. From 2016-2018, in people aged 75 and over cerebrovascular diseases were the 3rd leading cause of death with 25,147 deaths caused. During this time period cerebrovascular diseases were the 5th leading cause of death for people aged 65–74 and was not in the top 5 leading causes of death for any other age group.

The incidence of stroke events increases with age. In 2017, there were 2,595 stroke events per 100,000 population in individuals aged 75+. In the same year, there were 507 stroke events per 100,000 population in individuals aged 55–74. In 2015, in individuals aged 65+ stroke was the 4th leading cause of total burden and it was not in the top 5 leading cause of total burden for any other age group.

==== Sex ====
Men have a higher morbidity from strokes than women, with 214,000 men in 2018 living with the effects of stroke compared to 173,000 women. In 2017, in peoples aged 75+ 1,344 men per 100,000 population experienced a stroke event compared to 1,251 women per 100,000 population. Women experienced higher mortality rates and burden of disease from cerebrovascular diseases and stroke respectively than men. In 2018, there were 5,808 female deaths from cerebrovascular diseases compared to 4,164 male deaths. In 2015, in people aged 85 and older, stroke accounted for 8.1% of the disease burden in women compared to 6.6% of the disease burden in men.

==== Aboriginal and Torres Strait Islander people ====
Aboriginal and Torres Strait Islander people have higher age-standardised rates for hospitalisations caused by stroke, deaths from stroke and burden of disease caused by stroke than non-Indigenous people. Aboriginal and Torres Strait Islander people are 1.6 times more likely to be hospitalised for stroke, 1.3 times more likely to die from stroke and experience 2.3 times more disease burden caused by stroke than non-Indigenous Australians.

=== Socioeconomic Factors ===
Individuals from low socioeconomic areas are more likely to experience a stroke, be hospitalised for stroke, die from stroke and have a higher disease burden caused by stroke than individuals from high socioeconomic areas. In comparing the age-standardised rates for these areas, people from the lowest socioeconomic areas are 2.3 times more likely to have a stroke, 1.4 times more likely to be hospitalised for stroke, 1.3 times more likely to die from stroke and experience 1.4 times more disease burden caused by stroke than individuals from the highest socioeconomic areas.

== Economic and Social Impacts ==
Direct and Indirect Financial Costs of Stroke in Australia (2012)
Type of Costs	AUD million
Health System Expenditure	881
Total Direct Financial Costs	881
Productivity Costs:	2,987
Employee Impacts	975
Absenteeism	1,138
Presenteeism	665
Premature Death	208
Search and hiring costs	0.4
Other Indirect Financial Costs:	1,112
Carer Costs	222
Aids and modifications	388
Funeral Costs	11
Deadweight Loss	491
Total Indirect Financial Costs	4,098
Total Financial Costs	4,979

Cerebrovascular diseases, in particular stroke, have significant ongoing economic impacts and social impacts on survivors in Australia. Other groups of individuals such as carers, employers, the Australian Government and the rest of society also bear costs attributed to stroke events.

=== Economic impact ===
Cerebrovascular diseases lead to significant health system expenditure and other financial costs in Australia, with the majority of this economic impact being attributed to stroke events. In 2012, total direct financial costs of stroke which consists of health system expenditure related to stroke events were $881 million. The Australian government and state, territory and local governments paid 42.7% and 26.4% of the total respectively. Individuals paid 18.3% of the total and others in society paid the remaining 12.6%.

Stroke also contributed to major indirect financial costs in Australia. In 2012, the cost of lost earnings due to decreased employment and cost of absenteeism of working age stroke survivors was $975 million and $1.138 billion respectively. Total productivity costs of stroke were $2.987 billion and total indirect financial costs were $4.098 billion. Total financial costs attributed to stroke in 2012 were $4.979 billion.

=== Social Impact ===
Cerebrovascular diseases can have a significant social impact on its survivors. Stroke is a chronic condition and it negatively affects stroke survivors’ capabilities in social interactions and community participation. The carers of stroke survivors also often experience a decrease in the extent to which their own needs are being met. In the 2011 survey of Australian stroke survivors and their carers, 57% of stroke survivors who had a partner or spouse experienced a worsening of their relationship. This negative change in relationships was reported to be moderate to extreme by 34% of stroke survivors. Stroke survivors reported a worsening of their relationships with family members and people other than family in 43% and 51% of cases respectively. When asked if they needed emotional support outside of family and friends, 61% of stroke survivors responded yes. Out of this 61% of stroke survivors, 52% reported that they were not receiving sufficient external emotional support.

In carers of stroke survivors, 31% of carers who were the partner or spouse of an individual suffering from stroke reported moderate to extreme changes in their relationship. In carers who participated in leisure activities, 47% reported a moderate to severe reduction in their ability to partake in these activities after assuming a carer role. Carers also reported moderate to extreme changes in relationships with family members and people outside of their family, with 20% and 32% of carers reporting this to be the case respectively.

== Australian Initiatives ==
The Cardiovascular Health Mission is an Australian government initiative that is aimed at addressing the significant impacts of cardiovascular diseases, with stroke being a priority of the initiative. As part of the initiative, in 2019 the Medical Research Future Fund and the National Health and Medical Research Council committed $220 million over 10 years towards making improvements in heart disease and stroke for Australia by accelerating Australian research through creating a world-class research environment. The Medical Research Future Fund and the National Health and Medical Research Council have also committed $24 million to The George Institute for Global Health to assist in the leading research being carried out by the institute. The University of Melbourne and The Royal Melbourne Hospital were also funded $1 million to support the development and implementation of early stroke diagnosis tools in air and road ambulances.

In 2019, the Heart Foundation and Stroke Foundation announced The National Action Plan for Heart and Stroke which details how the Australian government can reduce the prevalence and disease burden of cardiovascular diseases such as stroke. This plan is focused around areas such as prevention and early detection, support and care, diagnosis and treatment and research to improve cardiovascular diseases including stroke. The Australian Government has announced $4 million in funding so far towards this action plan to support these areas of priority.

== See also ==
- Health in Australia
- Health care in Australia
- Indigenous health in Australia
