= Medion =

German consumer electronics company

Medion AG
- Type: Subsidiary
- Traded as: See parent
- Industry: Consumer electronics
- Founded: 1983; 43 years ago
- Headquarters: Essen, Germany
- Area served: Europe, Asia-Pacific, United States and Australia
- Products: Computers; Televisions; Refrigerators; Toasters; Fitness equipments
- Revenue: €1.43 billion (2011)
- Number of employees: 1,013 (2011)
- Parent: Lenovo; Motorola Mobility
- Website: Medion

Medion AG is a German consumer electronics company. The company operates in Europe, Asia-Pacific, the United States and Australia. The company's main products are computers and notebooks, but also smartphones, tablet computers, digital cameras, TVs, refrigerators, toasters, and fitness equipment.

Today, Medion is owned by Chinese multinational technology company Lenovo, who became majority shareholders in 2011 and bought it outright in 2025.

== Products ==
Medion products in Australia and the United States are available exclusively at Aldi and Super Billing Computers, with some products (such as DVD players) branded as Tevion (Aldi's own brand). Some of Medion's formal laptops were sold in North America at Best Buy stores and were sold in Canada at Future Shop as Cicero Computers.

In the United Kingdom, Medion products, including laptops and desktop computers, have been sold by Aldi, Sainsbury's, Somerfield, Woolworths, and Tesco, as well as being sold directly through Medion's own Web site and various other online retailers.

Medion launched Aldi Talk, also MEDIONmobile, in Germany and ALDImobile in Australia in an agreement with Aldi Stores. Medion Australia Pty Limited remains the owner of ALDIMobile.

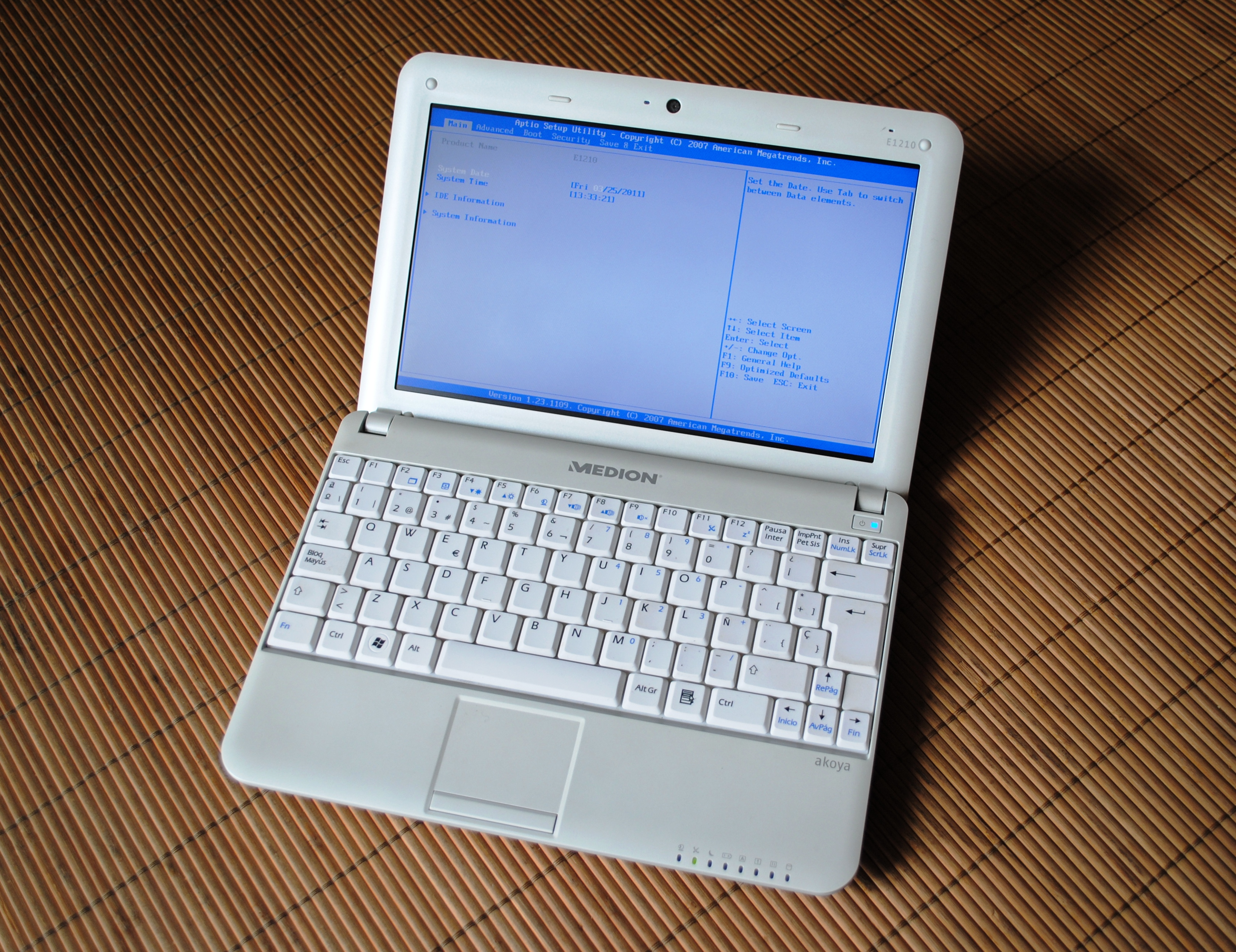
Medion Akoya E1210

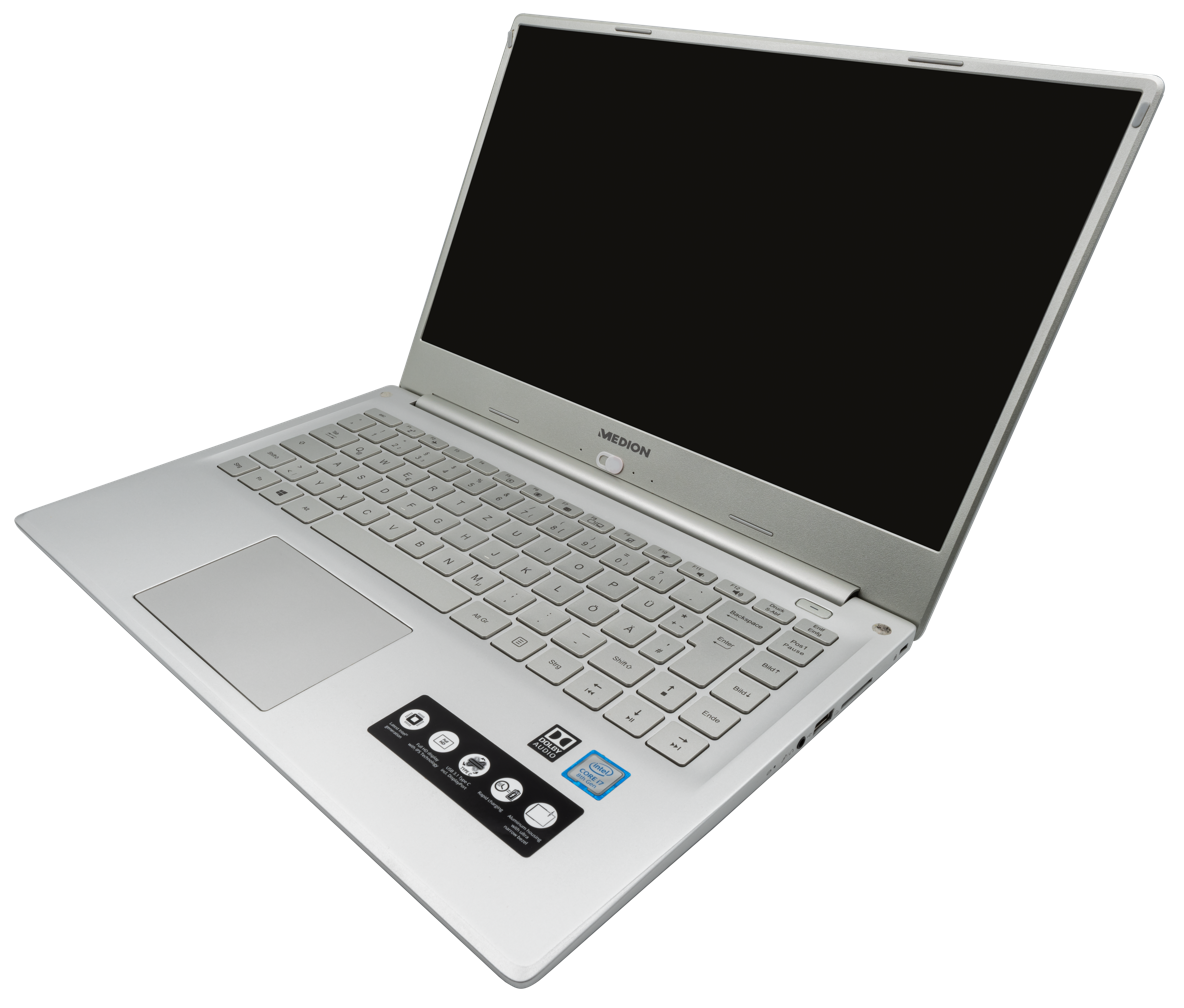
Medion Akoya S6445

In China, Medion products are sold under the Lenovo brand, but not all Lenovo-branded products are Medion products.

In Germany, Medion has launched a cloud gaming service in partnership with Gamestream in April 2020.

== Sponsorship ==
Medion sponsored Sahara Force India through Formula One team driver Adrian Sutil in Formula One from 2007 to 2011, until Sutil left the team. In 2013, Sutil returned to Sahara Force India, and Medion returned as a sponsor. Medion left the sport at the end of 2013.

== Medion brands ==
Other brands used on Medion products:

- Cybercom
- Cybermaxx
- Life
- Lifetec
- Micromaxx
- Essenitel b
- Ordissimo
- ERAZER
- PEAQ
- QUIGG

These Medion products can be recognized by the serial number starting with "MD" or "LT".

== Acquisition ==
On 1 June 2011, the Chinese multinational Lenovo Group (LNVGY) announced plans to acquire Medion AG. Since August 2011, they have held the majority stake in Medion. In 2025, Lenovo completed its acquisition of all remaining shares in Medion and the company was delisted from the stock exchange.
