= Barker Inlet Power Station =

- Country: Australia
- Location: Torrens Island, South Australia
- Coordinates: 34.804°S 138.524°E
- Status: Operational
- Construction began: February 2018
- Commission date: 4 November 2019
- Construction cost: A$295M (stage 1)
- Owner: AGL Energy
- Operator: AGL Energy

Thermal power station
- Primary fuel: Natural gas
- Secondary fuel: Diesel fuel
- Turbine technology: Reciprocating engine
- Cooling source: air cooled

Power generation
- Units operational: 12
- Make and model: Wärtsilä 50DF
- Units planned: 12 (if stage 2 is built)
- Nameplate capacity: 210 (+ 210 if stage 2 is built)

External links
- Website: www.agl.com.au/about-agl/how-we-source-energy/thermal-energy/barker-inlet-power-project

Barker Inlet Power Station is a power station in South Australia. It was announced on 7 June 2017 by AGL Energy to replace part of its ageing Torrens Island Power Station and was built alongside the existing station on Torrens Island in the northwestern suburbs of Adelaide. The power station was commissioned on 4 November 2019.

== Construction and development ==
Construction was expected to start in the third quarter of 2017, with commissioning in the first quarter of 2019, however that start date passed before the development application had been submitted. Construction was announced to begin on 5 February 2018 and expected to be operational in the second half of 2019. The new power station is expected to be 28% more efficient than the oldest gas turbines at Torrens island, and can ramp from zero to full capacity in five minutes.

The application for Development Approval to build the new power station as a replacement for Torrens Island A was submitted on 3 October 2017 and published for public comment on 8 November 2017. The application is for two stages, each consisting of 12 reciprocating engines. Each stage is proposed to generate 210 MW for a total of 420 MW. Only Stage 1 was constructed in 2019.

The new generating units have a fast response time of five minutes from startup to full capacity, enabling a quick response to reductions in wind and solar power generation. The power station can be stopped in less than a minute, enabling rapid response to increase of renewable energy production. Wärtsilä is the principal contractor for the development. Wärtsilä supplied 12 of its 50DF dual-fuel reciprocating engines. They are expected to operate primarily on natural gas, but are capable of operating on liquid fuel if required. The characteristics of the engines enable the power station to respond to fluctuations in supply from renewable energy power sources such as wind turbines. Primero is contracted by Wärtsilä to undertake the actual construction and was expected to compete it in September 2019. The power station was officially opened on 4 November 2019.

== See also ==
- AGL Energy
- List of power stations in South Australia
