= Click Energy =

Australian energy retailer

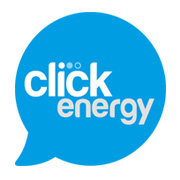
- Type: Subsidiary
- Industry: Energy retailer
- Founded: April 2006
- Defunct: 2021
- Headquarters: Melbourne, Victoria, Australia
- Areas served: Victoria; New South Wales; Queensland; South Australia
- Services: Electricity retailing
- Parent: AGL Energy
- Website: www.clickenergy.com.au

Click Energy was an Australian energy retailer selling electricity to residential and business customers in Victoria, New South Wales, South Australia and Queensland.

== Services ==
Click Energy's services included:

- Residential Electricity
- Residential Natural Gas
- Residential Solar compatible plans (BYO panels/system)
- Business Electricity
- Business Gas

== History ==
The company was established in April 2006, and in June 2006 it acquired its electricity licence. Click Energy started in Victoria and received its electricity licence in June 2006, with its first customer transfers in January 2007. In March 2007, Click Energy entered the Queensland electricity market and in March 2013 the New South Wales electricity market.

The company was acquired by Nu Energy in July 2012. Click Energy formed a partnership with the American energy technology company Stem in April 2013 to promote Stem's products to Click's customers.

In July 2013 Click Energy reached an agreement with consumer-driven network One Big Switch to offer an electricity deal to One Big Switch members in Queensland. One Big Switch and Click Energy collaborated again in October 2013, when they offered electricity at a discounted rate to New South Wales residents.

2015 Winner of Canstar's Most Satisfied Customers Electricity Providers - QLD Award

2015-2016 Winner of Canstar's Value For Money Electricity Providers - QLD Award

In October 2017, Click Energy was acquired by Amaysim for $120 million.

2017 Winner of ProductReview.com.au services award.

In September 2020, AGL Energy signed an agreement to acquire Click Energy from Amaysim for $115 million. In March 2021, the Australian Energy Regulator accepted Click Energy's application to surrender its retail licenses and all 200,000+ Click Energy customers were subsequently migrated to AGL.

== See also ==
- Energy in Australia
