= Australian Reward Investment Alliance =

The Australian Reward Investment Alliance (ARIA) is a superannuation trustee for Australian Government employees. It manages three superannuation schemes, the Commonwealth Superannuation Scheme (CSS), the Public Sector Superannuation Scheme (PSS) and the Public Sector Superannuation Accumulation Plan (PSSap). It was set up under the Australian Government Superannuation Act 1990 and is a statutory corporation.

The current ARIA Board is an amalgamation of the PSS Board and the CSS Board which were, respectively, the individual Trustees for the PSS and CSS. ARIA is trustee for over A$18 billion of funds under management, and has 325,578 members.

== See also ==
- Australian Government Future Fund, funding vehicle for future superannuation liabilities
