= Amaysim =

Australian MVNO

Amaysim Mobile Pty Ltd
- Type: Division
- Traded as: ASX: AYS (2015–2021)
- Industry: Telecommunications
- Founded: November 2010; 15 years ago
- Founder: Peter O'Connell, Rolf Hansen, Christian Magel, Thomas Enge, Andreas Perreiter
- Headquarters: Sydney, New South Wales, Australia
- Area served: Australia
- Key people: Vir Nath (CEO)
- Products: Mobile phone plans; Mobile phones; NBN Home Internet; Wearables
- Number of employees: 130
- Parent: Optus (2021–present)
- Website: www.amaysim.com.au

Amaysim Mobile Pty Ltd is an Australian provider of mobile phone plans. Amaysim operates as a mobile virtual network operator on the Optus mobile network, and specialises in offering a range of prepaid and PAYG (Pay As You Go) mobile services. As of June 2024, Amaysim had over 1.5 million mobile subscribers.

Amaysim was founded in 2010. The company was listed on the Australian Securities Exchange from 2015 until its acquisition by Optus in 2021.

== History ==
Amaysim was founded as an Australian telecommunications provider by Peter O'Connell, Rolf Hansen, Christian Magel, Thomas Enge and Andreas Perreiter in November 2010.

Amaysim became a publicly listed company following an IPO/share offer and floated on the Australian Securities Exchange in July 2015.

In January 2016, Amaysim acquired Vaya, another Australian mobile virtual network operator for A$70 million.

Amaysim entered the broadband market in July 2016 with the acquisition of Internet service provider AusBBS for $4 million ($1 million in cash, $1.5 million in Amaysim shares on completion and another $1.5 million in shares one year after completion).

In early 2017, the Amaysim group acquired the online energy retailer Click Energy for $120 million in a move to extend its range of services to Australian households.

In October 2018, Amaysim sold all of its 15,000 broadband customers to Southern Phone for $3 million and stopped reselling broadband services. The company cited "unsustainably high wholesale costs, intense competition and the need to allocate the company's capital appropriately" as reasons for the exit.

In December 2019, Amaysim acquired Jeenee Mobile, a mobile virtual network operator for $7.8 million. Jeenee Mobile's existing 41,700 customers were migrated to Amaysim's sister brand Vaya.

In June 2020, Amaysim acquired OVO, a mobile virtual network operator for $15.8 million. The deal added 77,000 mobile subscribers to Amaysim's subscriber base.

In September 2020, AGL Energy signed an agreement to acquire Click Energy from Amaysim for $115 million.

On 2 November 2020, Amaysim entered into a share sale agreement with Optus, where Optus acquires 100% of Amaysim shares for A$250 million. It was delisted on 6 April 2021.

In April 2024, Optus announced it would shut down the Vaya brand and all its customers were subsequently migrated to Amaysim.

In September 2024, Amaysim relaunched its broadband internet plans.

In January 2025, Circles.Life ceased its Australian operations, transferring existing customers to Amaysim.

== Controversy ==
Between October 2017 and March 2018, its online energy retailer, Click Energy, told its consumers that they could receive discounts between 7 and 29% below its market energy offers if they paid their bills on time and that consumers could save between $84 and $946 if they switched to Click Energy. In March 2019, the Federal Court of Australia ordered penalties of $900,000 for misleading claims, because discounts were calculated on their market offer rates which were higher than their standing offer rates available to all consumers, while savings were calculated based on estimated savings if they paid on time rather than if they switched to Click Energy. In addition, Click Energy was ordered to send each affected customer a notice correcting the misleading claims.

In January 2020, Amaysim published an advertisement on Twitter (now X) that included the statement "…your mother loves the Unlimited Mobile Data offer from amaysim" and the hashtag ‘#UnlimitedMobileData’ when its plan provided unlimited data only for the first three renewals, before reverting to a capped amount. In October 2020, amaysim was fined $126,000 by the Australian Competition & Consumer Commission for misleading advertising, misrepresenting the "unlimited" data it claimed to provide in its advertisement.
