= Broken Hill Solar Plant =

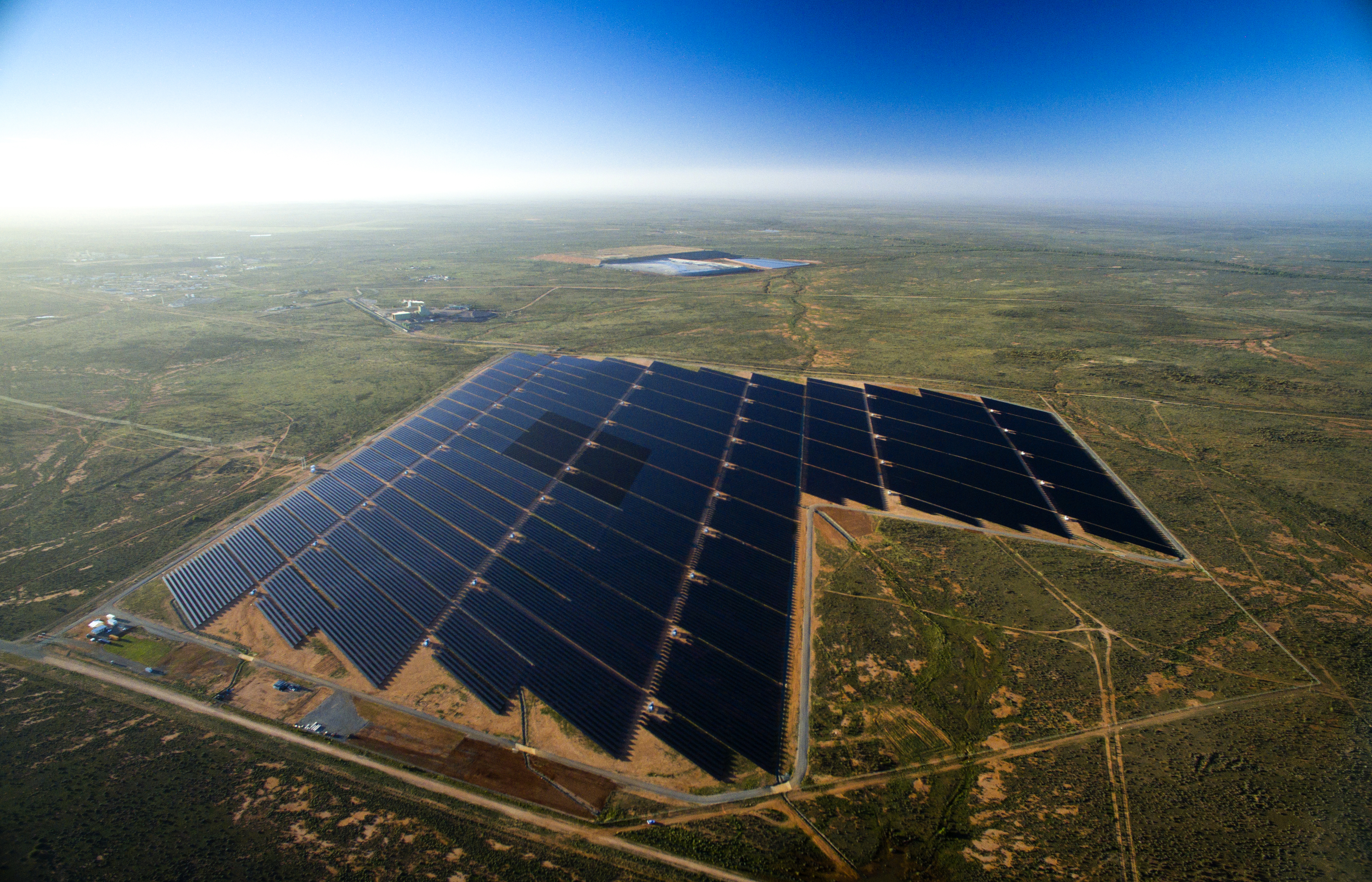
- Country: Australia
- Coordinates: 31°59′S 141°23′E
- Status: Operational
- Commission date: December 2015
- Owners: AGL Energy; Powering Australian Renewables Fund
- Operator: AGL Energy

Solar farm
- Type: Standard PV

Power generation
- Nameplate capacity: 53 MW

External links
- Website: www.agl.com.au/about-agl/how-we-source-energy/broken-hill-solar-plant

The Broken Hill Solar Plant, which became operational in December 2015, is a 53 megawatt farm located 7 km west of Broken Hill in western New South Wales, Australia. It is associated with the Nyngan Solar Plant (almost 600 km to the east), making the total capacity of the combined plants 155 megawatts.

The Australian Energy Commission sets the regulations for the Australian Energy Market Operator (AEMO). The AEMO calculates and publishes MLFs (Marginal Loss Factor) every year by 1 April as required under clause 3.6 of the National Electricity Rules ahead of commencing on 1 July. These figures are forward-looking projections based on expectations of the demand and dispatch patterns of that upcoming year, as well as the network flows and losses that are expected to occur during that year.

The Broken Hill solar plant, like other generation near the edge of the grid, has suffered from changes in marginal loss factor calculations. The 2017-18 financial year (FY) Marginal Loss Factor (MLF) of 1.2841 to 1.0603 (2018-19 FY MLF) affected revenue. The 2019/20 MLF was 0.8349 and the 2020/21 MLF was 0.8644. On 12 September 2019, the output of the farm was reduced by 50%. In 2025, the MLF was increased from 78 to 94, allowing more generation, assisted by the 50 MW Broken Hill battery.

== Powering Australian Renewables Fund ==
Ownership of the Nyngan and Broken Hill solar plants was transferred from AGL Energy to Powering Australian Renewables Fund (PARF), an infrastructure fund closely associated with but independent to AGL.
