= AusBBS =

Australian Internet service provider

AusBBS (Australian Broadband Services Pty Limited) was an Australian Internet service provider (ISP) offering Internet and phone services. It was one of the first ISPs to launch with a specific focus on Australia's National Broadband Network (NBN) which is being rolled out by the Federal Government via the fully owned NBN Co. Providers such as AusBBS have also been referred to as Retail Service Providers (RSPs) since the commencement of the NBN.

== History ==
AusBBS was founded in 2012 by Internet entrepreneur Rob Appel, who previously founded Chaos.com, the first Australian retailer to sell music over the Internet. AusBBS has been cited as the first purely cloud-based ISP and the first to offer unlimited NBN plans. The company has been set up by a group of key ex-employees from OzEmail, which was the earliest major ISP to break through in Australia.

In July 2016, AusBBS was acquired by Amaysim for $4 million ($1 million in cash, $1.5 million in Amaysim shares on completion and another $1.5 million in shares one year after completion).

== Key events ==
- April 2012 – AusBBS Launches with NBN products on it Cloud ISP platform
- November 2012 – First PAYG (Pay as you Go) product on the NBN
- February 2013 – Launch into social media and the release of ADSL, VOIP and bundled offerings
- May 2013 – First ISP to launch unlimited 100/40 fibre plans on the NBN
- August 2013 – AusBBS signs as first reseller of the LBNco/Service Elements FTTP networks
- March 2015 – First provider to launch TPG Telecom FTTB
- July 2016 – Purchased by Amaysim
