= Dundonnell Wind Farm =

Wind farm in Victoria, Australia

- Country: Australia
- Location: Mortlake
- Coordinates: 37°52′S 142°58′E
- Status: Operational
- Construction began: January 2019
- Commission date: March 2020
- Owner: Tilt Renewables

Wind farm
- Type: Onshore
- Hub height: 114 metres
- Rotor diameter: 150 metres

Power generation
- Units operational: 80 × 4.2 MW
- Make and model: Vestas V150-4.2MW
- Nameplate capacity: 336 MW

External links
- Website: www.tiltrenewables.com/assets-and-projects/Dundonnell-Wind-Farm/

Dundonnell Wind Farm is at Dundonnell, 23 kilometres (14 mi) northeast of Mortlake in the Australian state of Victoria. Construction began in January 2019 and was completed in 2020 with 80 Vestas wind turbines with a capacity to generate 336MW of electricity. The drive trains and hubs were assembled at the former Ford Australia site in Geelong.

The wind farm has contracts to supply 37% of its output to the government of Victoria and 50% to Snowy Hydro. It is being developed by Tilt Renewables. The wind farm connects to the grid via 38 kilometres of 220kV overhead transmission line to a substation near the Mortlake Power Station.

A 327 tonne transformer transported at night took four nights to reach Dundonnell from Glen Waverley in eastern Melbourne in August 2019. It was manufactured there by the Wilson Transformer Company. The developer spent $80 million to connect the wind farm to the main 500 kV grid via a 38 km 220 kV Ausnet line, avoiding the connection problems many other generating stations have in the interior. Full commissioning was delayed in mid-2020 due to concerns of the Australian Energy Market Operator (AEMO), despite it being commissioned according to a plan negotiated with AEMO in 2018.
