= Silverton Wind Farm =

Wind farm in New South Wales, Australia

- Country: Australia
- Location: Barrier Ranges, New South Wales
- Coordinates: 31.794°S 141.258°E
- Status: Commissioned
- Construction began: May 2017
- Commission date: 2019
- Construction cost: A$450 million
- Owner: Powering Australian Renewables Fund
- Operator: AGL Energy

Wind farm
- Type: Onshore
- Hub height: 110 metres (361 ft)
- Rotor diameter: 130 metres (427 ft)

Power generation
- Units operational: 58 × 3.43 MW
- Make and model: General Electric 3.4-130
- Nameplate capacity: 199 MW
- Capacity factor: 44.7%
- Annual net output: 780 GWh

External links
- Website: www.agl.com.au/silverton/

The Silverton Wind Farm is a 199-megawatt wind farm situated on the southern end of the Barrier Ranges in New South Wales, north of Silverton, built for AGL Energy by Catcon and General Electric. Planning began around 2007, and the wind farm was finally fully commissioned in May 2020, following some setbacks due to grid issues after initial implementation in 2018.

== History ==
Initial surveys were done in 2007, which identified the presence of the tawny rock dragon (Ctenophorus decressi) in the area planned for the wind farm. In 2008 a study was conducted on the status and distribution of the species.

On 3 May 2009, the project was approved by the Government of New South Wales, comprising two stages: project approval for Stage 1 and a larger concept approval for Stage 2.

The project was initially set to begin construction in the first half of 2010, yet several issues caused delays. To begin, the transmission line needed to connect the fully developed wind farm would need to be as long as 300 km (190 mi), and due to multiple connection options, as well as an expected large cost of the infrastructure, the decision of the final solution was delayed.

In 2012, the start-date for construction of the wind farm was pushed back to 2014, after AGL Energy decided to give priority to building two solar photovoltaic plants, which had received almost $200m in government funding.

The project's planning approval was set to expire on 24 May 2016; however AGL submitted a modification application on 25 February 2016 with the sole aim of extending the project's planning approval expiry to 2021. On 3 June 2016 that application was granted, giving AGL the option to optimise and build the project within its Powering Australian Renewables Fund. The project secured a power purchase agreement with EnergyAustralia for supply of 60% of its annual output until December 2030.

On 16 May 2017, AGL announced construction had commenced.

== Description ==
The 199-megawatt wind farm is located in the Barrier Ranges, NSW. It was built for AGL Energy by Catcon and General Electric. Its western border is 120 m (390 ft) above sea level, while Mount Mundi Mundi reaches 400 m (1,300 ft) above sea level.

According to the NSW Government in 2023, the facility is one of the most effective wind farms in Australia.

== Operations ==
The wind farm began grid output in May 2018. The project uses General Electric 3.43-130 wind turbines with a hub height of 110 m (360 ft). It was expected to operate at a capacity factor of 44.7%, generating 780 GWh of energy annually.

The wind farm was finally fully commissioned in May 2020 following long setbacks due to grid issues. These problems are reflected in the energy generation, with the plant being constrained during the day reducing its capacity factor. In 2025, its 'marginal loss factor' was increased from 80 to 90, allowing more generation, assisted by the 50 MW Broken Hill battery.

Silverton Wind Farm Generation (MWh) (Note: The generation table uses a tool called eljmkt nemlog to obtain generation values for each month.)
| Year | Total | Jan | Feb | Mar | Apr | May | Jun | Jul | Aug | Sep | Oct | Nov | Dec |
|---|---|---|---|---|---|---|---|---|---|---|---|---|---|
| 2018 | 98,281 | N/A | N/A | N/A | N/A | 1,173* | 8,291* | 9,773* | 16,620* | 13,393* | 12,587* | 16,547* | 19,897* |
| 2019 | 423,891 | 25,034* | 23,497* | 19,293* | 24,920* | 35,078* | 36,616* | 43,479* | 54,842* | 37,470* | 38,784* | 38,730* | 46,148* |
| 2020 | 714,688 | 52,541* | 51,637* | 53,098* | 45,626* | 62,276* | 55,901 | 60,736 | 56,356 | 72,114 | 63,339 | 67,442 | 73,622 |
| 2021 | | 72,477 | 68,650 | 70,560 | 46,165 | 57,701 | 59,791 | 60,643 | 52,254 | 53,054 | | | |

Note: Asterisk indicates power output was limited during the month.
