= Powering Australian Renewables Fund =

Infrastructure fund initiated by AGL

Powering Australian Renewables
- Type: Investment fund
- Industry: Renewable energy
- Founded: 2016; 10 years ago
- Fate: Merged with Tilt Renewables
- Headquarters: Australia
- Owners: QIC 40%; Future Fund 40%; AGL Energy 20%

Powering Australian Renewables (PowAR) was an Australian infrastructure investment fund closely associated with but independent from AGL Energy. Following PowAR's 2021 takeover of Tilt Renewables, PowAR was renamed Tilt Renewables.

== History ==
Initial investment in PowAR was $200M from AGL, and up to $800M from each of QIC Global Infrastructure Fund and the Australian sovereign wealth fund, the Future Fund.

PowAR’s initial assets included the Nyngan Solar Plant and the Broken Hill Solar Plant, both developed by AGL Energy in 2015. It added Silverton Wind Farm and Coopers Gap Wind Farm soon after, both developed by AGL. In 2021, PowAR was a partner in a consortium formed to take over Tilt Renewables. PowAR would receive the Australian assets of Tilt Renewables, with Mercury NZ to receive the New Zealand assets.

In August 2021, PowAR took over the Australian assets and operations of the former Tilt Renewables, making it the largest private developer and generator of wind and solar electricity in Australia. The combined organisation was subsequently renamed to Tilt Renewables. It held the assets of both former entities, and was owned 40% by QIC, 40% Future Fund and 20% AGL.
