= Torrens Island Power Station =

Power station in South Australia

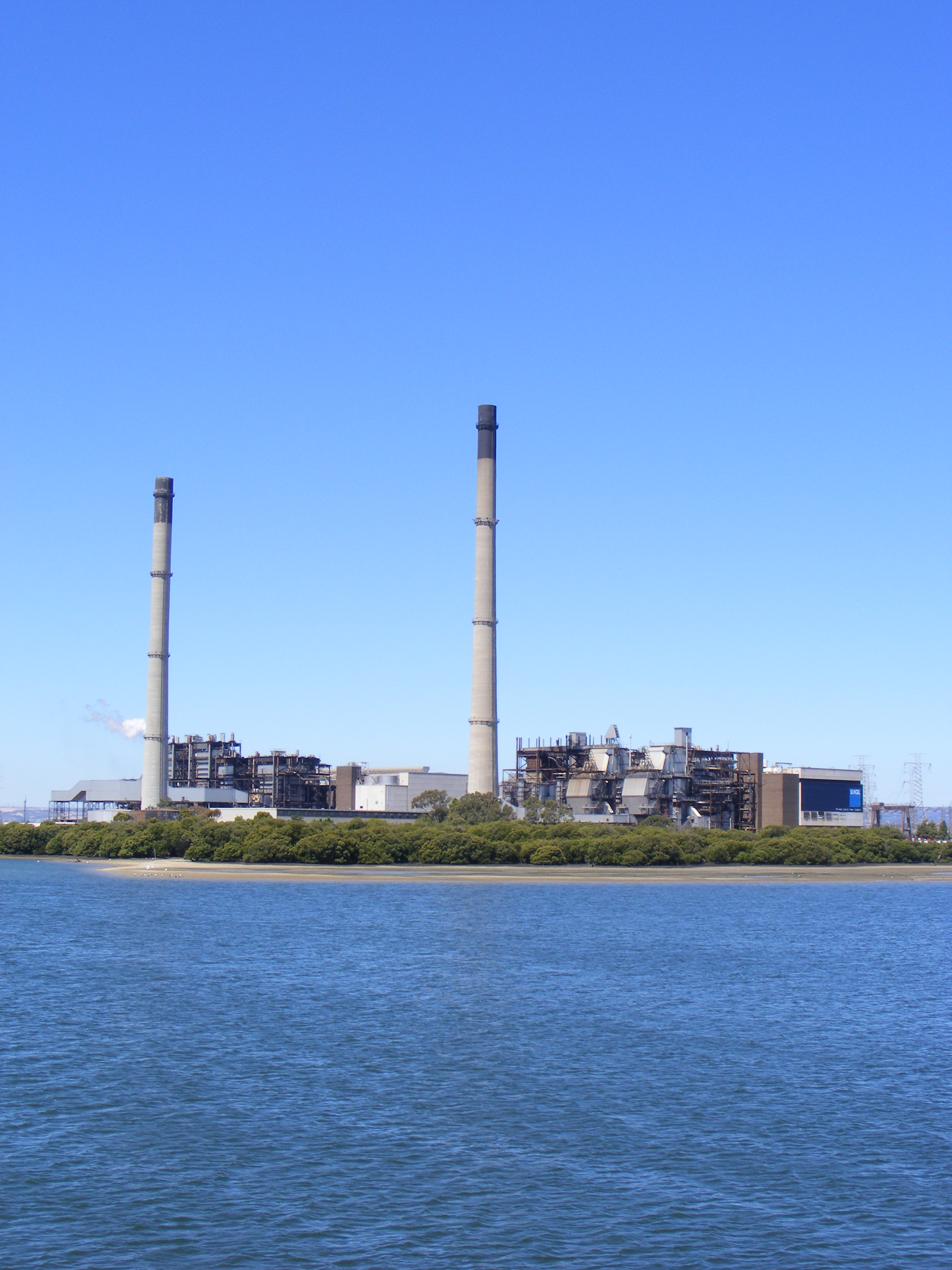
- Country: Australia
- Location: Torrens Island, South Australia
- Coordinates: 34°48′24″S 138°31′24″E
- Status: Operational
- Construction began: 1963
- Commission date: 1967
- Owner: AGL Energy
- Operator: AGL Energy

Thermal power station
- Primary fuel: Natural gas
- Turbine technology: Steam turbine
- Cooling source: Port Adelaide River

Power generation
- Units operational: 3 × C A Parsons
- Nameplate capacity: 600 MW

External links
- Commons: Related media on Commons

Torrens Island Power Station is located on Torrens Island, near Adelaide, South Australia and is operated by AGL Energy. It burns natural gas in eight steam turbines to generate up to 1,280 MW of electricity. The gas is supplied via the SEAGas pipeline from Victoria, and the Moomba Adelaide Pipeline System (MAPS) from Moomba in the Cooper Basin. The station is capable of burning either natural gas or fuel oil. It is the largest power station in South Australia and was formerly the largest single power station user of natural gas in Australia.

== Construction ==
Construction began in 1963 following passing of a government act vesting the land and authorising construction. The 480 MW (4 x 120 MW) A Station was completed in 1967, and construction of the 800 MW (4 x 200 MW) B Station was completed in 1982.

== Gradual shutdown ==
In December 2014 AGL announced that it intended mothballing the four older units of the A Station indefinitely, having taken them out of service between July and September 2014. This decision was primarily driven by increasing levels of wind and solar generation in the South Australian region of the National Electricity Market displacing fossil fuel generation, particularly higher cost gas-fired generation. AGL reviewed this decision and deferred the planned mothballing in June 2016, following the closure of Alinta's Northern and Playford B coal-fired power stations at Port Augusta

However, due to the state-wide power outage in September 2016, the system operator AEMO demanded that the Torrens Island power station to be brought back online to prevent another statewide power outage.

AGL announced on 7 June 2017 that it intended to permanently mothball two of the turbines in the 50-year-old Torrens A power station, after building a new 210 MW power station containing twelve gas reciprocating engines to be known as Barker Inlet Power Station adjacent to the Torrens Island site. The first two units (2 and 4) would be mothballed from 1 July 2019, with the remaining two units (1 and 3) planned to be mothballed after winter 2020 and winter 2021. AGL announced a delay in the closure schedule in July 2019, with Units 2 and 4 rescheduled to close in September 2020, and Units 1 and 3 to close in September 2021 and September 2022. On 7 July 2021, AGL announced plans to also mothball unit B1 in October 2021. It will be able to be recalled on 6 months lead time. At the same time, AGL announced construction of a 250 MWh grid battery on the Torrens Island site, operating in 2025. On 24 November 2022, AGL announced that it would bring forward full closure, and Torrens Island B would be retired on 30 June 2026, extended in 2025 to 2028.

== See also ==
- AGL Energy
- List of power stations in South Australia
