= Nyngan Solar Plant =

Solar panel farm in Australia

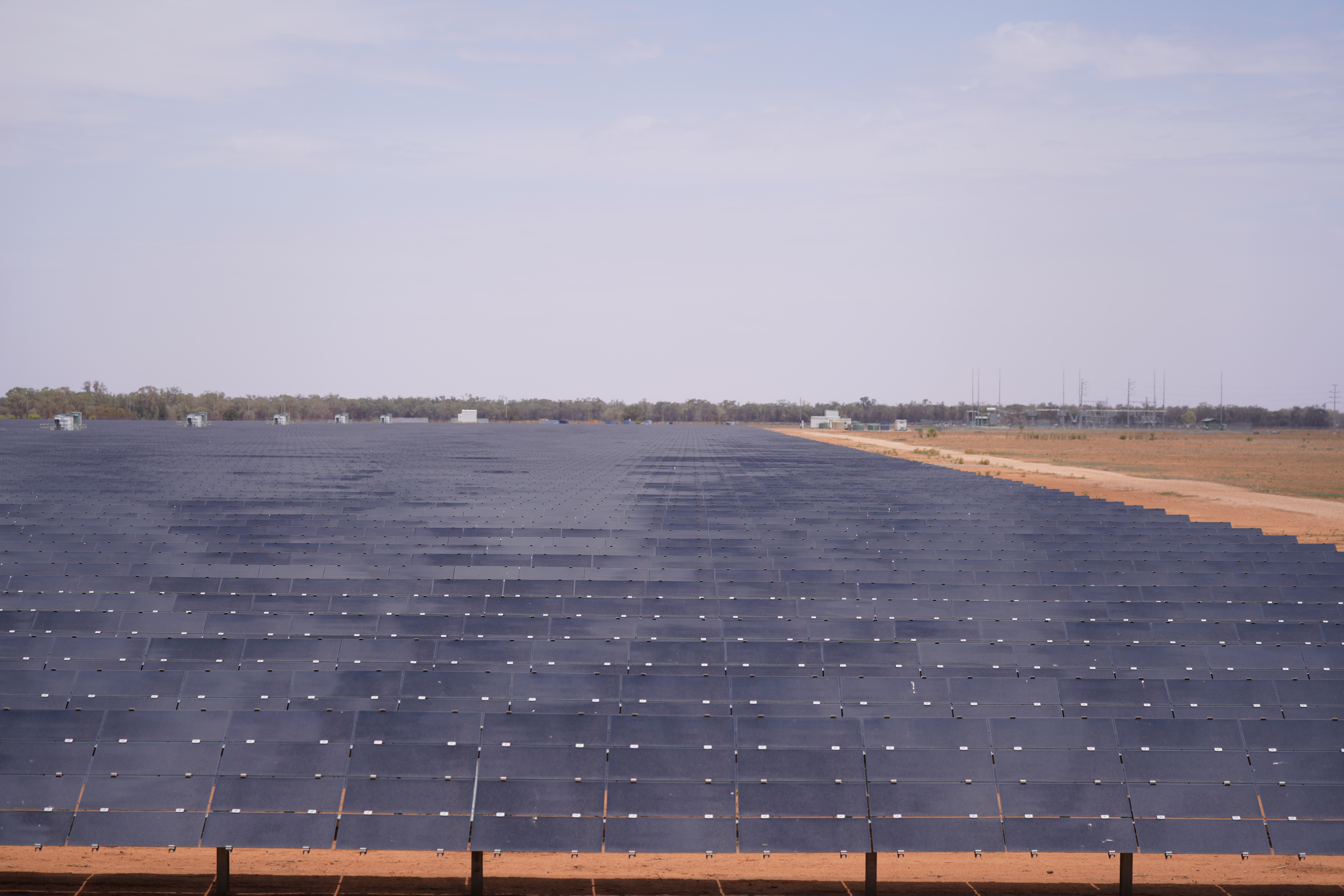
- Nyngan Solar Plant in 2019
- Country: Australia
- Location: Nyngan, New South Wales
- Coordinates: 31.566°S 147.072°E
- Status: Operational
- Commission date: July 2015
- Construction cost: A$440 million
- Owner: Powering Australian Renewables Fund
- Operator: AGL Energy

Solar farm
- Type: Flat-panel PV
- Collectors: 1,350,000
- Site area: 250 hectares (620 acres)

Power generation
- Nameplate capacity: 102 MW

The Nyngan Solar Plant or Farm is one of the largest operating solar plants in Australia. At the time of construction, it was the largest solar plant in the Southern Hemisphere. It is located 10 km west of Nyngan in western New South Wales. It was built and is operated by AGL Energy.

It has over 1.3 million solar panels, generating 102 megawatts of power. It was opened on 18 April 2015, and became fully operational in July 2015. The Nyngan Solar Plant is associated with the Broken Hill Solar Plant, a 53 megawatt farm located almost 600 km west, which became operational in December 2015, making the total capacity of the combined plants 155 megawatts. The solar panels do not track the movement of the sun. They are arranged in rows facing north, tilted at 25 degrees.

== Financial impact ==
The plants were constructed with $166.7 million funding support from the Australian Renewable Energy Agency (ARENA) and $64.9 million from the NSW Government. There was some criticism of the use of Government funding. Both plants were constructed by AGL in partnership with First Solar, Bogan Shire Council (Nyngan) and Broken Hill City Council, and local communities. The total cost of the projects was $440 million.

Annually, the two plants combined will produce approximately 360,000 MWh of renewable energy, powering more than 50,000 average Australian homes, AGL claims.

== Powering Australian Renewables Fund ==
Ownership of the Nyngan and Broken Hill solar plants was transferred in late 2016 from AGL Energy to the new Powering Australian Renewables Fund (PARF), an infrastructure fund closely associated with but independent from AGL.
