= Coopers Gap Wind Farm =

Wind farm in Queensland, Australia

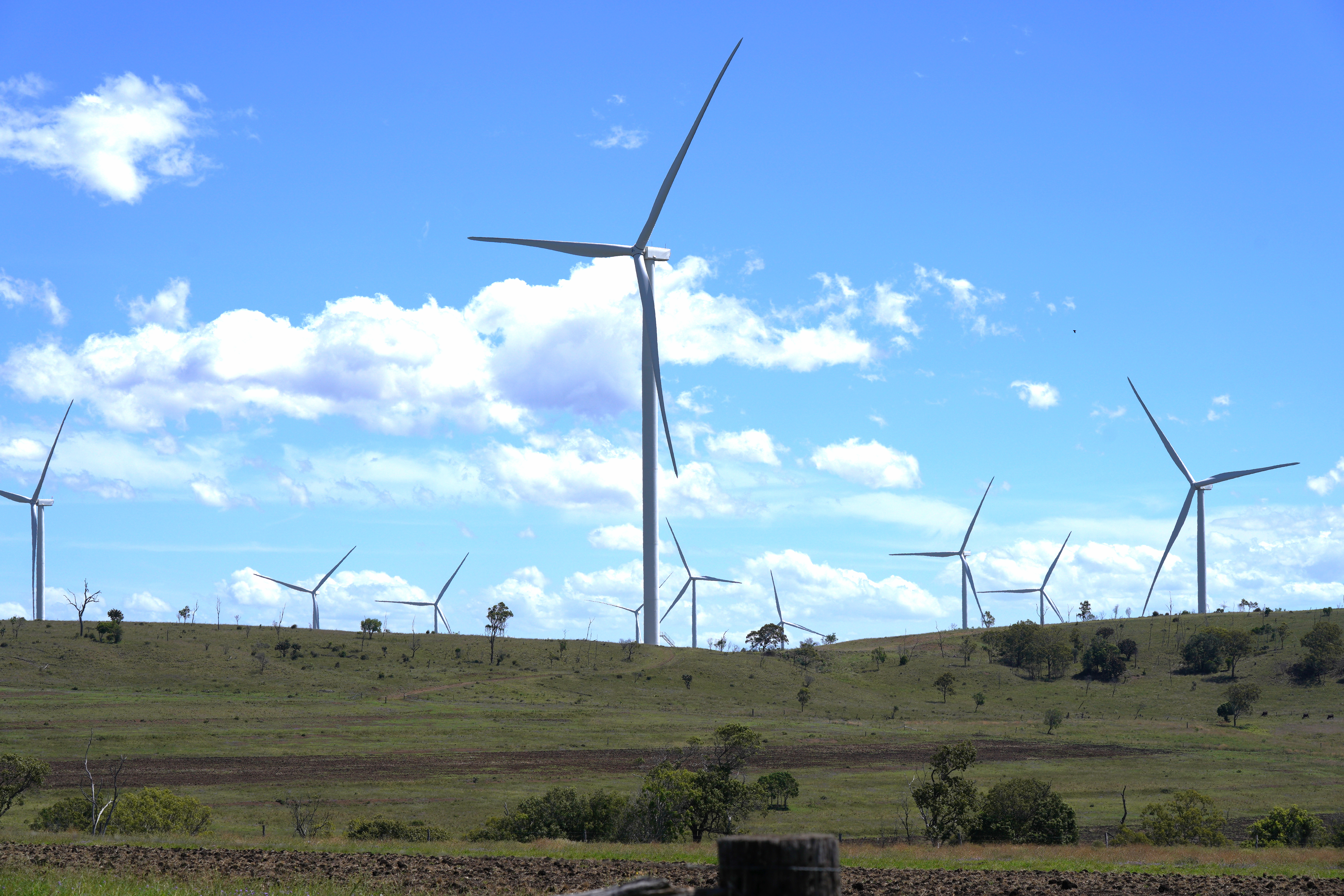
- Coopers Gap Wind Farm in 2021
- Country: Australia
- Location: Bilboa and Cooranga North, Queensland
- Coordinates: 26.743°S 151.45°E
- Status: Commissioned
- Construction began: February 2018; 7 years ago
- Commission date: 2020; 5 years ago
- Construction cost: A$850 million
- Owner: Powering Australian Renewables Fund
- Operator: AGL Energy
- Employees: 20

Wind farm
- Type: Onshore
- Hub height: 110 metres (361 ft) GE 3.6-137; 115 metres (377 ft) GE 3.8-130
- Rotor diameter: 130 metres (427 ft); 137 metres (449 ft)
- Site area: 10,200 hectares (102.00 km^{2})
- Site elevation: 535 to 840 metres (1,755 to 2,756 ft)

Power generation
- Units operational: 91 × 3.63 MW; 32 × 3.83 MW
- Make and model: General Electric 3.6-137; General Electric 3.8-130
- Nameplate capacity: 453 MW
- Capacity factor: 33.56% (average 2022-2024)
- Annual net output: 1.33 TWh (average 2022-2024)

External links
- Website: https://www.agl.com.au/about-agl/how-we-source-energy/coopers-gap-wind-farm

Coopers Gap Wind Farm is a 453 megawatt wind farm in the Western Downs and South Burnett regions of Queensland, Australia. It is located approximately 175 km north-west of the state capital Brisbane, and 50 kilometres south-west of Kingaroy and 65 kilometers north of Dalby. When construction was announced to be completed on 30 April 2020, it became the largest wind farm in Australia. This record was held until 10 December 2020 when the Stockyard Hill Wind Farm in Victoria was completed.

== Site ==
The wind farm is located in a hilly area, approximately 5 km to the north-west of the Bunya Mountains. It is located approximately 175 km (109 mi) north-west of the state capital Brisbane, and 50 km (31 mi) south-west of Kingaroy and 65 km (40 mi) north of Dalby.

The area is mostly cleared, cattle-grazing country and was originally planned to cover approximately 12,000 hectares (29,700 acres) in total, however the site area was reduced later in the development process to 10,200 hectares (25,200 acres). The site has an elevation of 535 to 840m. The project falls within both the South Burnett Regional Council and Western Downs Regional Council jurisdictions.

== History ==
The side was identified by Windlab using their proprietary WindScape wind mapping technology in late 2005, and a 60-metre wind-monitoring mast was installed in March 2006 in order to accurately measure wind speed and direction in the area. After twelve months of data capture, the proponents began securing land and pre-feasibility studies started.

In 2009, development approval was expected in the same year.

In April 2011, some local landholders expressed concerns at a community forum related to health effects and the noise of the wind turbines, some of which would be less than a kilometre from homes.

In March 2017, the project was approved by the Coordinator-General. The approved project consisted of up to 115 turbines, with a maximum tip height of 180m, and a maximum rotor diameter of 140m.

The first turbine generated electricity to the grid on 24 June 2019.

In June 2021, it was reported that GE Catcon had successfully demolished a faulty turbine tower on 27 May 2021 after faults were discovered during the commissioning process. Additionally, a further 50 turbines required component replacement after generator issues inside their nacelles were identified.

== Project ==
For a period of time, Coopers Gap was the largest wind farm in Australia. With a total generation capacity of up to 453 megawatts (607,000 hp), annually is expected to generate 1.51 million megawatt hours of energy, with a corresponding capacity factor of 38%. The wind farm consists of 123 turbines extending across a series of ridge lines within the site. The wind turbines are approximately 180 metres (591 ft) in height from the tower base to the tip of the blade. 91 of the turbines are rated at 3.6 MW with towers 110 metres (361 ft) high, with the blades approximately 67.2 m (220 ft) in length and a corresponding rotor diameter of 137 metres (449 ft). There are also 32 turbines rated at 3.8 MW with a rotor diameter of 130 metres (427 ft), but at a taller hub height of 115 metres (377 ft). The construction costs of the project were initially to be over $1.2 billion, however construction costs reduced from the start of the development process, so the final cost was A$850 million.

The electricity generated from each turbine is transmitted via underground or above ground cabling to a central cable marshalling point at the on site substation, which is located along the 275 kV power line that runs through the site area. The substation then connects directly into the grid network on site. It is expected to reduce greenhouse gas emissions by up to 2.2 million tonnes yearly.

== Operations ==
The wind farm registered its first grid output in June 2019 and was fully commissioned in June 2021. It was planned to be commissioned late in 2020. On 19 June 2021, the wind farm reached an output of 438.2 MW, or 99.59% of its maximum registered output of 440 MW.

Coopers Gap Wind Farm Generation (MWh)
Year	Total	Jan	Feb	Mar	Apr	May	Jun	Jul	Aug	Sep	Oct	Nov	Dec
2019	141,617	N/A	N/A	N/A	N/A	N/A	413*	3,134*	9,398*	21,843*	28,984*	38,725*	39,120*
2020	991,138	26,473*	30,890*	57,377*	48,224*	95,248*	87,140*	109,069*	98,270*	117,767*	119,562*	88,951*	112,167*
2021	1,285,449	113,633*	81,015*	103,283*	89,943*	100,389*	116,245	142,096	114,138	112,042	104,336	123,356	84,973
2022	1,387,927	119,201	117,842	94,755	113,563	124,605	101,656	128,484	113,009	101,010	128,918	127,131	117,753
2023	1,334,204	121,320	125,014	94,315	114,770	128,739	113,575	111,005	109,167	115,100	73,880	128,081	99,238
2024	1,273,539	119,519	90,740	145,793	100,849	110,247	72,161	120,650	93,426	80,505	111,553	126,348	101,748

Note: Asterisk indicates power output was limited during the month.

== See also ==
- Wind power in Australia
