= Medical Research Future Fund =

The Medical Research Future Fund (MRFF) is a research fund established in Australia by the Abbott government. It is managed by the Future Fund, with interest generated going to medical research. In 2020-2021, the MRFF reached its capitalisation target of $AU 20 billion, with annual investment returns of around $650 million used to fund medical research.

== Establishment ==
In the Australian federal budget, 2014 Treasurer Joe Hockey announced the Liberal-National Abbott government's commitment to build a $20 billion Medical Research Future Fund, in addition to existing funding through the National Health and Medical Research Council. Hockey predicted that the fund would, "within six years, be the biggest medical research endowment fund in the world" and announced that "all the savings from the introduction of a $7 Medicare co-contribution, modest changes to the Pharmaceutical Benefits Scheme and other responsible changes in this Health Budget" would be directed to the fund until it reaches $20 billion.

The Senate blocked passage of the medical co-payment, but approved the establishment of the Medical Research Future Fund in August 2015, with funding to be found through reduced health spending and the Health and Hospitals Fund, until a balance of $20bn is reached in 2020. The Fund is managed by the Future Fund, with interest generated going to medical research, beginning with $10 million in 2015, growing to $390m over the following three years.

== Purpose ==
Announcing the Fund proposal to Parliament on 13 May 2014, Joe Hockey said:

I can think of no more significant benefit from community contributions in health than to invest in cure and discovery research by our people for our people. From next year, funds will start flowing from the Medical Research Future Fund into new medical research. As a result, it may be an Australian who discovers better treatments and even cures for dementia, Alzheimer's, heart disease or cancer. If we start investing now, this new and historic commitment in medical research may well save your life, or that of your parents, or your child.

— Treasurer Joe Hockey, Budget Speech 2014

== See also ==
- Australian federal budget
