= Future Fund =

Australian sovereign wealth fund

- Type: Government-owned corporation
- Industry: Investments
- Founded: 2006; 20 years ago
- Headquarters: Melbourne, Victoria, Australia
- Key people: Greg Combet (Chair); Raphael Arndt (CEO)
- AUM: $289.4 billion (2024)
- Total assets: $224.9 billion (2024)
- Owner: Australian Government
- Number of employees: 314 (2024)
- Website: www.futurefund.gov.au

The Future Fund is an independently managed sovereign wealth fund established in 2006 to strengthen the Australian Government's long-term financial position by making provision for unfunded superannuation liabilities for public servants that will become payable during a period when an ageing population is likely to place significant pressure on the Commonwealth's finances.

== Purpose ==
The legislation establishing the Future Fund describes its main object as being 'to strengthen the Commonwealth's long-term financial position'. While legislation permits withdrawals from the fund from 1 July 2020, the government indicated in 2017 it intends to allow the fund to continue to accumulate until at least 2026/27 before making withdrawals. The Investment Mandate for the Future Fund is to target a benchmark return of at least the Consumer Price Index + 4 to 5 per cent per annum over the long term, while taking an acceptable but not excessive level of risk.

The Future Fund Board is currently also responsible for six other Australian sovereign wealth funds:

- DisabilityCare Australia Fund – A fund to contribute to the cost of the National Disability Insurance Scheme. At 31 December 2023, it was valued at A$16.9 billion.
- Medical Research Future Fund – A fund to disperse interest generated to medical research. At 31 December 2023, it was valued at A$22.3 billion.
- Future Drought Fund – A fund to provide secure, continuous funding for drought resilience initiatives. Valued A$4.7 billion at 31 December 2023.
- Aboriginal and Torres Strait Islander Land and Sea Future Fund (ATSILS Fund) – A fund to enhance the Commonwealth's ability to make payments to the Indigenous Land Corporation. Established in February 2019 with a capital contribution of A$2 billion transferred from the Aboriginal and Torres Strait Islander Land Account. Valued A$2.1 billion at 31 December 2023.
- Disaster Ready Fund – A fund to provide up to one billion dollars over the next five years, from 2023-24 for natural disaster resilience and risk reduction across Australia. Valued at A$4.7 billion at 31 December 2023.
- Housing Australia Future Fund – The A$10 billion Fund was established on 1 November 2023 to fund social and affordable rental housing.

The Education Investment Fund, a fund to provide capital investment in higher education and vocational education and training valued at A$3.9 billion in 2018, was ended by 2019 legislation, which redirected the money to natural disaster relief.

== Governance ==
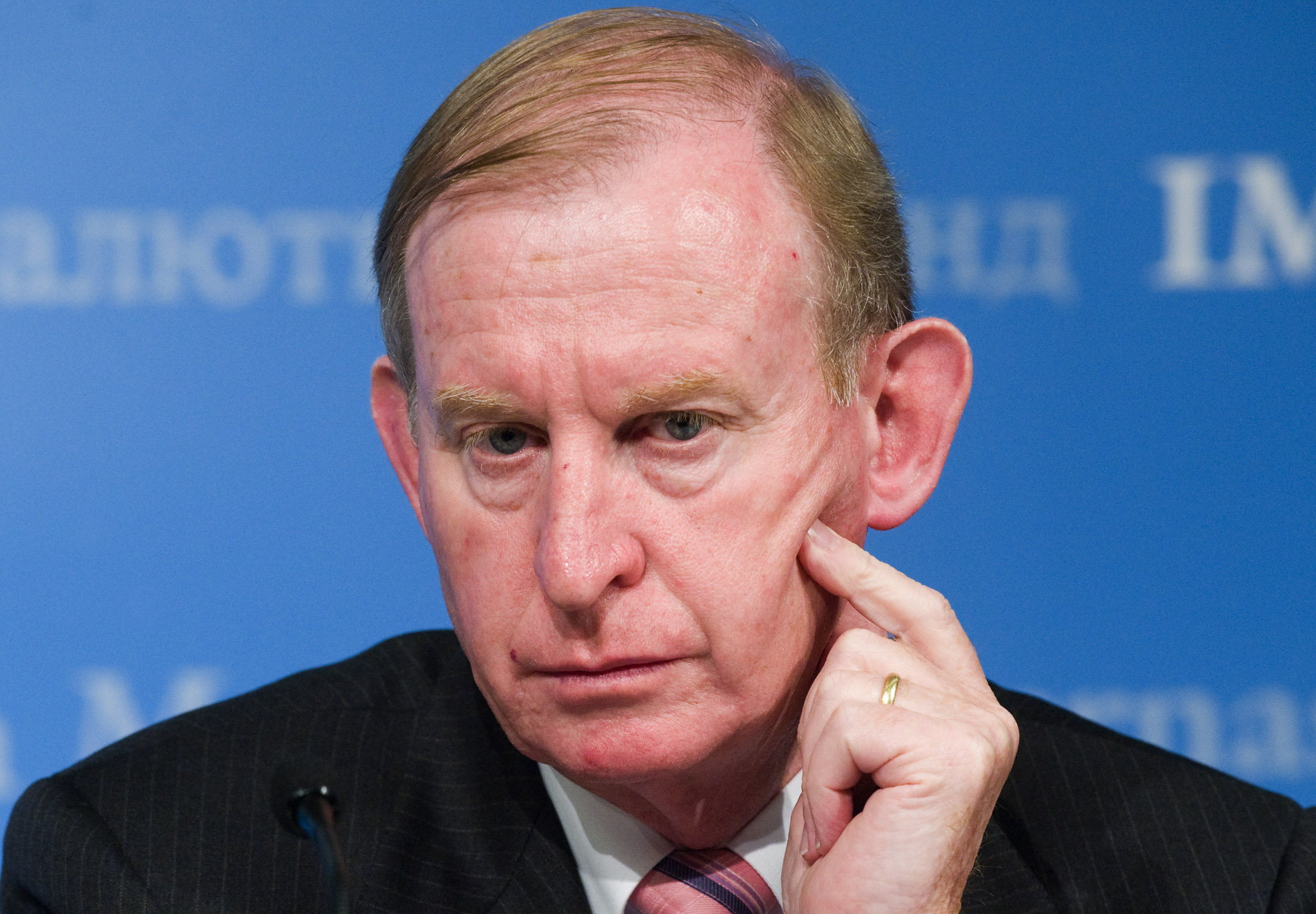
Inaugural chairman of the Board of Guardians, David Murray, pictured in 2008

Investment of the Future Fund is the responsibility of the Future Fund Board of Guardians with the support of the Future Fund Management Agency. The Future Fund is overseen by an independent Board of Guardians selected on the basis of their expertise in investment management and corporate governance. The current Board composition is:

Position	Name	Term commenced	Term expires	Term served
Chair	Greg Combet	1 June 2024		
Guardian	Deborah Ralston	15 September 2021	15 September 2026	5 years, 61 days
Guardian	Patricia Cross	11 May 2021	11 May 2026	5 years, 188 days
Guardian	Rosemary Vilgan	4 February 2024	4 February 2029	2 years, 284 days
Guardian	Michael Wachtel	3 April 2016	3 April 2026	10 years, 226 days
Guardian	Mary Reemst	6 October 2023		
Guardian	Nicola Wakefield Evans	1 March 2024		

The Board was chaired by David Murray between 2006 and 2012. Amidst some controversy it was announced that David Gonski would succeed Murray as independent non-executive chairman when Murray's term expired on 3 April 2012. At the same time, Steve Harker, an investment banker from Morgan Stanley in Australia, replaced Brian Watson as a Guardian. David Gonski chaired the Board until January 2014 when it was announced that he would leave to chair the ANZ Bank. Costello was appointed the interim chair until the announcement of his permanent chairmanship in February 2014. Greg Combet replaced Costello as chairman in February 2024.

== History ==
On 11 September 2004, the Federal Treasurer, Peter Costello, announced that the Future Fund would be established following the 2004 federal election. The Future Fund Act 2006 received Royal Assent on 23 March 2006. On 5 May 2006, $18 billion, derived from government surpluses as well as income from the sale of a third of Telstra in its ongoing privatisation, was deposited into the fund. On 28 February 2007, the government transferred the Commonwealth's remaining 17% stake in Telstra, valued at A$8.9 billion, into the Fund. These contributions and transfers increased the Fund to over A$50 billion by the end of the 2006–2007 financial year.

In March 2007, the opposition Labor Party announced it would withdraw A$2.7 billion from the Future Fund to finance the National Broadband Network, an initiative to install broadband internet infrastructure across Australia, if it won the 2007 election; this proposal prompted government ministers to proclaim that Labor intended to "raid" the Future Fund for their own means. Labor later indicated that the use of any funds from the Future Fund towards a national high speed broadband network will have to comply and meet all requirements of any commercial investment. This included producing a commercial rate of return on the invested funds, with all profits being returned into the Future Fund allowing further investment.

In May 2007, it was revealed that the Chicago-based Northern Trust Corporation had won a competitive tender process to manage the Fund. Rick Waddell, President and Chief Operating Officer of Northern Trust, indicated that Australian companies did not have the expertise to manage the Future Fund. Northern Trust stood to collect A$30 million in annual fees. Controversy arose when it was realised that the Fund will be managed by a foreign bank with no base in Australia. National secretary of the Finance Sector Union Paul Schroder estimated that around 100 jobs will be lost when the US company starts managing the Fund from Singapore using staff from India. Northern Trust was linked to the Enron scandal. General Manager of the Future Fund Management Agency, Paul Costello, told a Senate estimates committee hearing that "We were not concerned that this represented a risk to us in terms of the arrangements that we were seeking to put in place with Northern Trust".

In his 2008 Australian federal budget speech, the Treasurer, Wayne Swan announced three new "Nation-Building Funds", also to be managed by the Future Fund Board. These included a $20 billion Building Australia Fund to invest in roads, rail, ports and broadband; an $11 billion Education Investment Fund, which absorbed the $6 billion Higher Education Endowment Fund set up by the previous government; and a $10 billion Health and Hospital Fund. In that budget and the following 2009 federal budget, the Labor Rudd government promised $41 billion to create these new funds.

The fund become a member of the International Forum of Sovereign Wealth Funds and signed up to the Santiago Principles on best practices for managing Sovereign Wealth Funds. As a member it publishes how it adopts and implements the principles within its governance procedures.

In May 2013, a DisabilityCare Australia Fund was established by the DisabilityCare Fund Act 2013. The Fund will fund the National Disability Insurance Scheme and is also to be managed by the Future Fund Board. The Fund is to receive contributions from the increase in the medicare levy by 0.5% to a total of 2% from 1 July 2014.

In the May 2014 federal budget, the Abbott government announced its intention to establish the Medical Research Future Fund and the Asset Recycling Fund and to discontinue the Building Australia Fund, Education Investment Fund and Health and Hospitals Fund. The Senate approved the establishment of the Medical Research Future Fund in August 2015, to be managed by the Future Fund, with interest generated going to medical research, beginning with $10 million in 2015, growing to $390m over the following three years.

In 2016, it was announced that the Future Fund, Queensland Investment Corporation and AGL Energy would form the Powering Australian Renewables Fund (PARF) investing in two of Australia's largest solar plants at the time.

In April 2018, the Future Fund contributed to the A$225 million Fund III of Blackbird Ventures, which was directed towards investments in technology companies based in Australia and New Zealand.

In April 2019, the Future Fund announced that it had returned an average of over 10% a year in the last decade. In September 2019, the Future Fund reported it had $162.6 billion in assets at the prior June 30, from seed capital of $60.5 billion in 2008, with no contributions made over the period. In December 2019, the Future Fund acquired a 24.1% stake in Canberra Data Centres from the Commonwealth Superannuation Corporation. In February 2025, the fund increased its stake to 34.55%. The deal valued CDC at A$17 billion.

In June 2021, the Future Fund led a consortium with the Commonwealth Superannuation and Sunsuper in acquiring a 49 per cent interest in Telstra InfraCo Towers for A$2.8 billion, valuing the company at A$5.9 billion. In November 2022, the fund participated in Blackbird Ventures Fund V, which closed at A$1 billion. The fund was focused on technology companies in Australia and New Zealand.

In November 2024, the Treasurer, Jim Chalmers, and the Finance Minister, Katy Gallagher, announced that the Future Fund will be directed to invest in green energy and housing projects where sustainable.

== Investments in nuclear weapons and tobacco industries ==
In May 2011, the Future Fund was criticised by The Age newspaper for investing $135.4 million in 15 foreign-owned companies involved in the manufacture of nuclear weapons for the United States, Britain, France and India. Information about the investments was obtained through a freedom of information request by the International Campaign to Abolish Nuclear Weapons.

In February 2013, the Future Fund announced it would exclude primary tobacco producers from its investment portfolios.

== Funds held under management ==
The total funds held under management, as of 31 December each year, inclusive of funds held in the Building Australia Fund, the Health and Hospitals Fund, the former Education Investment Fund and the DisabilityCare Australia Fund, are:

Date (31 Dec)	Total funds (billions)	Notes
2008	▲ A$59.62	
2009	▲ A$87.23	
2010	▲ A$90.51	
2011	▼ A$89.39	
2012	▲ A$94.96	
2013	▲ A$107.36	
2014	▲ A$119.47	
2015	▲ A$128.5	
2016	▲ A$139.5	
2017	▼ A$138.9	
2018	▲ A$147.0	
2019	▲ A$168.0	
2020	▲ A$170.9	
2021	▲A$203.6	
2022	▼A$196.1	
2023	▲A$211.9	
2024	▲A$237.9	
2025	▲A$267.4	

== See also ==
- Australian federal budget
- Australian Industry Development Corporation
- Generational accounting
- Superannuation in Australia
- List of countries by sovereign wealth funds
- Australian Reward Investment Alliance, superannuation trustee for Australian Government employees
