= Catcon (company) =

Civil & Allied Technical Construction Pty Ltd (CATCON)
- Industry: Civil engineering and construction
- Headquarters: Angle Park, South Australia, Australia
- Website: www.catcon.com.au

Catcon is an Australian construction and civil engineering company based in Adelaide, South Australia. It was rated at #50 in South Australia's "Top 100 companies" in 2015. Catcon is the company responsible for the Bolivar interchange and Little Para River Bridge section of the Northern Connector freeway in Adelaide.
