= Aldi Talk =

International group of mobile phone contracts from Aldi

- Type: Subsidiary
- Industry: Telecommunication
- Founded: 7 December 2005 (Germany); March 2013 (Australia)
- Defunct: 6 June 2017 (Belgium); 30 June 2022 (Netherlands)
- Headquarters: Germany; Austria; Australia; Slovenia; Switzerland
- Products: Mobile telecommunications
- Brands: Aldi Talk; MEDIONmobile; ALDImobile; Aldi Suisse Mobile; HoT Hofer Telekom
- Parent: Aldi/Hofer, Medion, Ventocom
- Website: https://www.alditalk.de https://www.aldimobile.com.au/ https://www.aldi-mobile.ch https://www.hot.at/ https://www.hot.si/

Aldi Talk, MEDIONmobile, ALDImobile, Aldi Suisse Mobile and HoT Hofer Telekom are brands of Aldi which are used as mobile virtual network operators in different countries.

The brands exist in Austria, Australia, Germany, Switzerland and Slovenia. It previously operated in Belgium and Netherlands.

== Operations by country ==
=== Germany ===
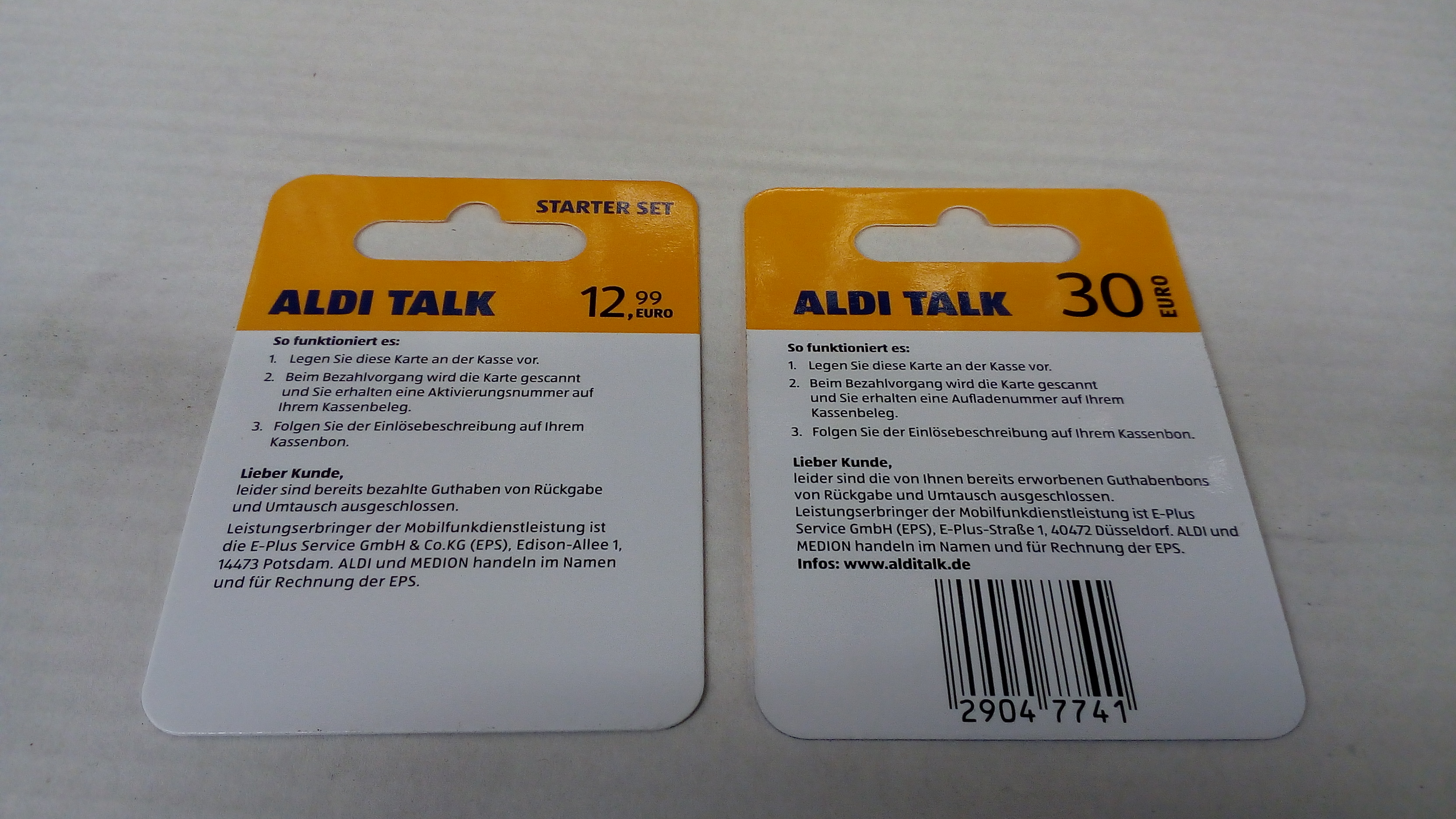
€12.99 and €30 Aldi Talk credit, purchased in Germany

Aldi Talk was founded on 7 December 2005. Medion is the mobile virtual network enabler (MVNE) for Aldi Talk in Germany. Since 2014 it uses the Telefónica Germany network, before it used E-Plus.

In 2018, it was estimated that there would be up to eight million customers in Germany, making the company the market leader among mobile virtual network operators.

=== Switzerland ===
Aldi Talk was launched in 2007 in Switzerland. The brand belongs directly to the telecommunications company Sunrise LLC.

=== Australia ===
ALDImobile launched in March 2013 in Australia. It uses parts of the Telstra network.

=== Austria ===
HoT Hofer Telekom was launched in January 2015 in Austria. Ventocom is the MVNE and the brand uses the Magenta Telekom and Drei Austria networks.

=== Slovenia ===
HoT Hofer Telekom was launched on 11 May 2017 in Slovenia. Ventocom is the MVNE and the brand uses the A1 Slovenija network.

== Discontinued operations ==
=== Belgium ===
Aldi Talk was launched in 2007 in Belgium. On 7 April 2017, it was announced that Aldi Talk would cease all operations in Belgium by 6 June. The cause of this decision was the coming in to effect of an anti-terrorism measure taken by the Belgian government, banning the sale and use of anonymous SIM cards, instead requiring the mobile operators to identify and register each of their clients. Because Aldi Talk did not have the capabilities to perform these tasks, a decision was taken to cease all operations in Belgium.

=== Netherlands ===
Aldi Talk was launched in July 2009 in the Netherlands. From 2009 until June 2022 Aldi Talk was represented in the Netherlands by KPN.
