= SpinTel =

Australian telecommunication company

SpinTel Pty Ltd
- Type: Private
- Industry: Telecommunications
- Founded: 1996 in Sydney, Australia
- Headquarters: Sydney, Australia
- Area served: Australia
- Key people: Liam Bal (CEO); Con Georgiopoulos (COO)
- Products: Residential Broadband; NBN bundles; 4G connectivity; 5G connectivity; Home phone
- Number of employees: 83 (est.)
- Website: www.spintel.net.au

SpinTel is an Australian-based telecommunications company that mainly provides residential/business broadband, 4G and 5G connectivity and home phone packages. It was founded as Spin Internet services in 1996, by Peter Stevens in Sydney, Australia.

== History ==
Established in 1996 in Sydney, under the name of Spin Internet services, it focused mainly on providing dial-up internet locally. In 2002, Spin Internet services launched ADSL services which had recently become available on the Australian market. In 2007, Spin Internet services signed a wholesale deal with Optus and Telstra to resell bundle DSL services. From 2008, Spin Internet provided 3G mobile handsets and mobile internet plans. In 2011, it reverted to only selling mobile broadband and mobile airtime. In 2011, Spin Internet changed its name to Spintel, to better reflect the company's approach to telecommunications. In 2012, sister company Comcen merged with SpinTel, transferring all of its users. In 2014, SpinTel launched an NBN service bundle.

== Controversy ==
In 2015, it was discovered that SpinTel has accidentally removed the unlisted classification of more than 400 silent numbers, which led them to be listed in both online and offline public number directories. SpinTel notified the affected users and issued an offer to change the numbers to unlisted ones.

== Awards ==
- Best-Value Broadband Bundled Plan award
- The Best Broadband Plan - Mobile award of the Money Magazine (2007).
- Best Broadband Plan - Mobile award of the Money Magazine (2007)
- Winner of BRW's Fast 100, ranked 71 st out of 100 of the fastest growing companies in Australia. (2010)
- Best Cheapest Broadband Plan - Light User of the Money Magazine (2010)
- Announced Finalist of BRW's Private Business of the Year 2011 in the Fastest Growing, less than 100 million dollar revenue category (2011)
- Winner of BRW's Fast 100, ranked 83 st out of 100 of the fastest growing companies in Australia. (2011)
- Best Broadband Plan - Mobile of the Money Magazine (2011)
- Best Cheapest VoIP Plan' of the Money Magazine (2012)
- Best Broadband Plan - Mobile of the Money Magazine (2012)
- Best Broadband Bundle Plans of the Money Magazine (2014)
- Best Broadband Bundle Plans of the Money Magazine (2016)
- Best Value Broadband Plan of the Money Magazine (2017)
- Best Broadband Bundle Plan of the Money Magazine (2017)
- Best Value Mobile Plan - Average Usage of the Money Magazine (2018)
- Best Value Mobile Plan - Average Usage of the Money Magazine (2019)
- Best Value Broadband Plan of the Money Magazine (2020)
- Best Value Mobile Plan - Average Usage of the Money Magazine (2020)
- Best Value Mobile Plan - Average Usage of the Money Magazine (2021)
- Best Value Mobile Plan - Average Usage of the Money Magazine (2022)
- Best Value Broadband Plan - Average Usage of the Money Magazine (2022)
- SpinTel Internet is a ProductReview.com.au Awards Winner for (2022)

== See also ==
- List of Australian mobile virtual network operators
