= AGL Energy =

Australian electricity generator and retailer

AGL Energy Limited
- Type: Public
- Traded as: ASX: AGL; S&P/ASX 50 Component
- Industry: Energy; Utilities
- Predecessor: Australian Gas Light Company
- Founded: 1837
- Headquarters: Sydney, New South Wales, Australia
- Key people: Damien Nicks (CEO)
- Products: Energy; Natural gas; Wind power; Hydroelectricity; Coal seam gas; Telecommunication
- Services: Electricity generation; Electricity distribution; Electricity retailing; Natural gas distribution and retailing
- Revenue: ▲ A$14.39 billion (2025)
- Net income: ▼ A$640 million (2025)
- Total assets: ▲ A$16.20 billion (2025)
- Subsidiaries: ActewAGL (25%); Perth Energy; Southern Phone
- Website: www.agl.com.au

AGL Energy Ltd is an Australian listed public company involved in both the generation and retailing of electricity and gas for residential and commercial use. It is one of the "big three" retailers in the National Electricity Market. AGL is Australia's largest electricity generator, and the nation's largest carbon emitter.

In 2022, 83% of its energy came from burning coal. It is, however, targeting 12 gigawatts of new renewable energy by 2035, when all of its coal fire generators are aimed to be closed. It closed Liddell Power Station in 2023, but aims to close Bayswater Power Station in 2033, and Loy Yang A Power Station in 2035.

== History ==
=== 1837–2006: Australian Gas Light Company ===
The Australian Gas Light Company was formed in Sydney in 1837, and supplied town gas for the first public lighting of a street lamp in Sydney in 1841. The company gradually diversified into electricity and into a number of different locations.

ActewAGL, a joint venture between the Australian Gas Light Company and Icon Water, a government-owned enterprise of the ACT Government, was formed in October 2000 as Australia's first utility joint venture. Twenty-five per cent owned by AGL Energy, ActewAGL provides electricity, natural gas, and telecommunication services to business and residential customers in the Australian Capital Territory and south-east New South Wales.

=== 2006–present: AGL Energy ===
On 6 October 2006, the Australian Gas Light Company and Alinta merged and restructured to create two new listed companies, a restructured Alinta Ltd and AGL Energy Ltd.

In Victoria, in June 2012, AGL Energy acquired Loy Yang A Power Station and the Loy Yang coal mine. Loy Yang A has four generating units with a combined capacity of 2,200 MW.

In New South Wales, in September 2014 AGL Energy acquired Macquarie Generation from the New South Wales Government for $1.5 billion. Macquarie Generation's assets included the 2,640 MW Bayswater Power Station, the 2,000 MW Liddell Power Station, the 50 MW Hunter Valley Gas Turbines and the Liddell Solar Thermal Project. From the two thermal coal power stations and two oil-fired gas turbines, Macquarie Generation supplies approximately 12% of the National Electricity Market and 30% of the New South Wales electricity market. In early stages, Macquarie has commenced development of solar thermal power as a renewable source of energy.

AGL announced in April 2015 and reaffirmed in September 2017 that it intends to close the Liddell Power Station in 2022. The closure of this and other coal-burning power stations in Australia led to Prime Minister Malcolm Turnbull, to seek advice from the Australian Energy Market Operator on extending the life of a number of them, to head off future power shortages. Turnbull said the government had been advised that if the Liddell plant were to close in 2022, there would be a 1,000 MW gap in base load, dispatchable power generation.

In 2018, AGL was among 17 energy businesses that supported the launch of the Energy Charter, a global initiative aimed at bringing together all parts of the power supply chain to give customers more affordable and reliable energy.

In 2019, AGL entered the telecommunications industry with the purchase of Southern Phone, a regional telecommunications company. In September 2020, AGL signed an agreement to acquire energy retailer Click Energy from Amaysim for $115 million. The company began selling broadband Internet services under its own brand in November 2020 and, in February 2021, it launched AGL Mobile, a mobile phone service provider.

In June 2021, AGL announced its intention to split into a bulk power generator and a carbon-neutral energy retailer. AGL Energy was to be rebranded as Accel Energy and hold the company's coal-fired power plants and wind farm contracts, while the electricity and gas retail assets were to be spun off into a separately listed company, AGL Australia. In May 2022, the proposed split was abandoned with the chairman, two board members and CEO resigning, the company citing the proposal was unlikely to gain the required 75% shareholder approval.

In August 2024, AGL announced it would acquire Firm Power, a grid-scale battery project developer, and its affiliated Terrain Solar, a developer of solar and wind farm projects, for $250 million. In February 2026, AGL agreed to sell its telecommunications business to Aussie Broadband for $115 million in Aussie shares plus up to $10 million in shares based on growth targets.

=== Mergers and acquisitions ===
This is a listing of AGL's corporate acquisitions and disposals.

Date	Company	Business	Valuation millions AUD	Acquisition / Sale
September 1995	Solaris 50%	Electricity distribution and retail	$950 million (total value of Solaris)	Acquisition
January 1998	Solaris 50%	Electricity distribution and retail	$219 million	Acquisition
January 2000	Electricity Trust of South Australia	Electricity retail	$219 million	Acquisition
July 2000	Australian Pipeline Trust	Pipeline assets	-	Sale
December 2000	Dingo Blue	Telecom	$22 million	Acquisition
July 2002	Pulse	Electricity and gas retail	$880 million	Acquisition
November 2005	Southern Hydro renewable generation	737MW renewable generation across Victoria, NSW and South Australia.	$1400 million	Acquisition
February 2006	Demerger splitting retail and distribution	Splitting company into retail and distribution	-	-
February 2007	Power Direct Retail	Electricity retail	$1200 million	Acquisition
August 2020	Click Energy	Electricity retail	$115 million	Acquisition
August 2024	Firm Power and Terrain Solar	Renewable energy	$250 million	Acquisition

== Operations and significant assets ==
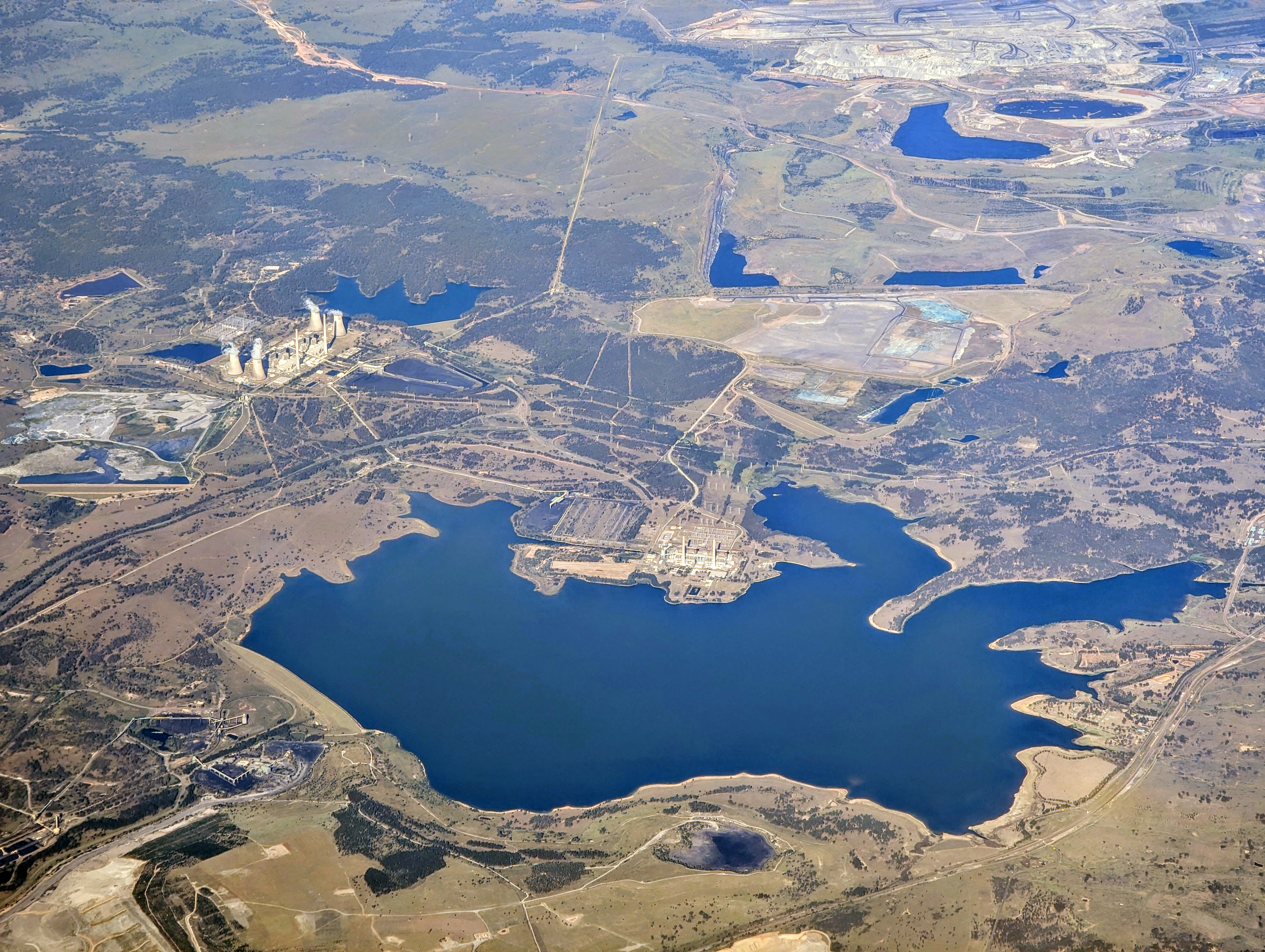
Aerial view of AGL Macquarie Bayswater (upper left) and Liddell (center) power stations (the latter was closed in 2023), with coal mining operations visible in the background

AGL has a diverse power generation portfolio—including base, peaking and intermediate generation plants—spread across traditional thermal generation as well as renewable sources including hydro and wind. The following tables listing significant assets are based on AGL's 2016 Annual Report.

=== Coal and gas fired power stations ===
Source	State	Max. capacity (MW)	Ref
Bayswater Power Station	NSW	2640	
Liddell Power Station (Closed April 2023)	NSW	2000	
Loy Yang A Power Station	Vic	2225	
Torrens Island Power Station	SA	1280	
Barker Inlet Power Station	SA	210	
Somerton Power Station (Gas turbines)	Vic	160	
Townsville Power Station; 50% interest – not operated by AGL	Qld	121 (50% of 242 MW)	

=== Renewable energy ===
Source	State	Max. capacity (MW)	Ref
Dartmouth Hydroelectric Power Station	Vic	180	
Eildon Hydroelectric Power Station	Vic	120	
Kiewa Hydroelectric Scheme	Vic	391	
Burrendong Hydroelectric Power Station	NSW	19	
Coopers Gap Wind Farm (20% ownership) in development	Qld	453	
Hallet Wind Farms (1,2,4 & 5)	SA	350	
Macarthur Wind Farm (50%, sold 2015)	Vic	420	
Oaklands Hill Wind Farm	Vic	63	
Silverton Wind Farm (20% ownership)	NSW	200	
Wattle Point Wind Farm	SA	91	
Broken Hill Solar Plant (20% ownership)	NSW	53	
Nyngan Solar Plant (20% ownership)	NSW	102	

AGL owns 0.1% of Tilt Renewables, Australia's largest privately owned renewable energy company.

=== Gas ===
Source	State	Maximum capacity	Ref
Newcastle Gas Storage	NSW	1.5 petajoules (0.42×10^{9} kWh)	
Silver Springs Gas Storage	Qld	35 petajoules (9.7×10^{9} kWh)	

=== Upstream gas projects ===
In 2015 the New South Wales Environment Protection Authority ordered the suspension of AGL's Gloucester operations after finding toxic chemicals had been introduced into Hunter Water's systems. The EPA subsequently found no "evidence of harm to the environment or pollution of waters" and AGL was allowed to continue its Gloucester operations.

In February 2016, AGL announced that exploration and production of natural gas assets would no longer be a core business for the company. This followed years of campaigning, including protests at shareholder meetings and a non-violent blockade of exploration sites, by anti-CSG community group Groundswell Gloucester. This announcement included clarification that AGL would not proceed with the Gloucester gas project and that it would cease production at the Camden Gas Project in South West Sydney in 2023, twelve years earlier than previously proposed.

AGL has implemented a decommissioning and rehabilitation program for its well sites and other infrastructure in the Gloucester region. In November 2016, AGL commenced the progressive decommissioning and rehabilitation of wells at the Camden site.

=== Power generation projects in development ===
==== Coopers Gap Wind Farm ====
In August 2017, it was announced that the Coopers Gap Wind Farm would proceed to construction, with AGL securing funding from the Powering Australian Renewables Fund. When completed the 453 MW Coopers Gap Wind Farm will be the largest in Australia. The final wind turbine at the Coopers Gap Wind Farm was completed in April 2020.

==== Silverton Wind Farm ====
In May 2017, it was announced that construction had commenced on the 200 MW Silverton Wind Farm in north western New South Wales.

==== Barker Inlet Power Station ====
In June 2017, AGL announced the development of a new $295 million gas-fired generator in South Australia. The Barker Inlet Power Station, will replace two of the four Torrens Island A turbines which are expected to be decommissioned in late 2020. The island's B turbines will continue to operate as usual. The Barker Inlet Power Station was officially completed and handed over to AGL in early 2020.

==== Crib Point Gas Import Jetty ====
In August 2017, Crib Point Import Jetty was announced as the preferred location for a new terminal importing gas from other markets. The project was expected to cost $250 million, with construction expected to commence in 2021.

In 2021, the Andrews State Government halted the project, despite gas shortages being forecasted, forcing AGL to announce that it would no longer proceed with the project.

==== Kanmantoo pumped hydro ====
In April 2019, AGL announced that it had acquired the right to develop a pumped hydroelectric energy storage project in the mined-out main pit of the Kanmantoo mine on the eastern side of the Adelaide Hills in South Australia. The project is expected to be capable of storing and generating 250MW of electricity from 2024. In early 2020, AGL announced that it would not be proceeding with the Kanmantoo Pumped Hydro project.

=== Carbon emissions output ===
AGL currently owns three coal-burning power stations which produce a majority of its power generation.

The Australian Government Clean Energy Regulator publishes an annual list of the ten largest emitters of greenhouse gases. In the 2019-20 financial year, AGL came first place on the list, with reported emissions of 42.4 million tonnes, which is equivalent to nine million cars on the road.

AGL is responsible for more than double the carbon emissions of Australia's second-biggest electricity generator, and more than BHP, Rio Tinto, Glencore, and Qantas combined. AGL's coal-burning power stations are responsible for eight per cent of Australia's total national emissions.

== Powering Australian Renewables and Tilt Renewables ==
In February 2016, AGL announced the creation of the Powering Australian Renewables Fund. The Powering Australian Renewables Fund or PARF (later PowAR), owned and develops more than 1,000MW of large-scale renewable energy projects to support Australia's renewable energy capacity and transition to a low-carbon economy. Once fully invested, PARF expected to own approximately 10% of Australia's renewable energy capacity.

In June 2016, Queensland Investment Corporation and the Future Fund joined AGL as investors in Powering Australian Renewables. In 2021, PowAR took over and merged with Tilt Renewables. In November 2025, AGL sold 19.9% of its 20% stake in Tilt for A$750 million.

== See also ==
- Better Place
- Renewable energy in Australia
