= Southern Phone =

Australian telecommunications company

- Type: Subsidiary
- Industry: Telecommunications
- Founded: 2002; 24 years ago
- Headquarters: Moruya, New South Wales, Australia
- Products: Home phone services, Mobile phone services, Internet services
- Owner: AGL Energy
- Number of employees: 160
- Website: southernphone.com.au

Southern Phone (also known as Southern Phone Company) is an Australian telecommunications company. It is located at Moruya, New South Wales. Southern Phone was established in 2002. It operated as an unlisted public company and was owned by local councils until December 2019 when it was acquired by AGL Energy.

== History ==
In 2002, Southern Phone was formed by councils in New South Wales, Australia in order to extend affordable telecommunications into regional communities. The company received $4.77 million in initial funding from the Australian Government's Networking the Nation scheme. Local councils were shareholders, retaining profits in the community. Councils purchased two shares for $1 each. In 2017, Southern Phone had 35 shareholders including the Upper Lachlan Shire Council, Coffs Harbour City Council and Bellingen Shire Council.

Optus Satellite partnered with Southern Phone in October 2017 to launch the national broadband network (NBN) Sky Muster. Southern Phone uses the Optus 4G network, as well as parts of the Telstra 4G/3G network for its mobile services. By 2018, Southern Phone had delivered over $14.8 million in dividends to local councils with shares in the company.

In October 2019, AGL Energy entered an agreement to acquire Southern Phone from its 35 local councils shareholders for A$27.5 million. The acquisition was finalised in December 2019.

In May 2024, Southern Phone was fined $244,140 for the mishandling of 77 customer complaints between April and June 2023. In December 2025, the company was fined $2.5 million for breaching anti-scam laws. Vulnerabilities in Southern Phone's systems had led to the exposure of customers' mobile number services and bank accounts and customers losing at least $393,000.
