= St Kilda, South Australia =

Coastal township near Adelaide, South Australia

St Kilda
- Suburb
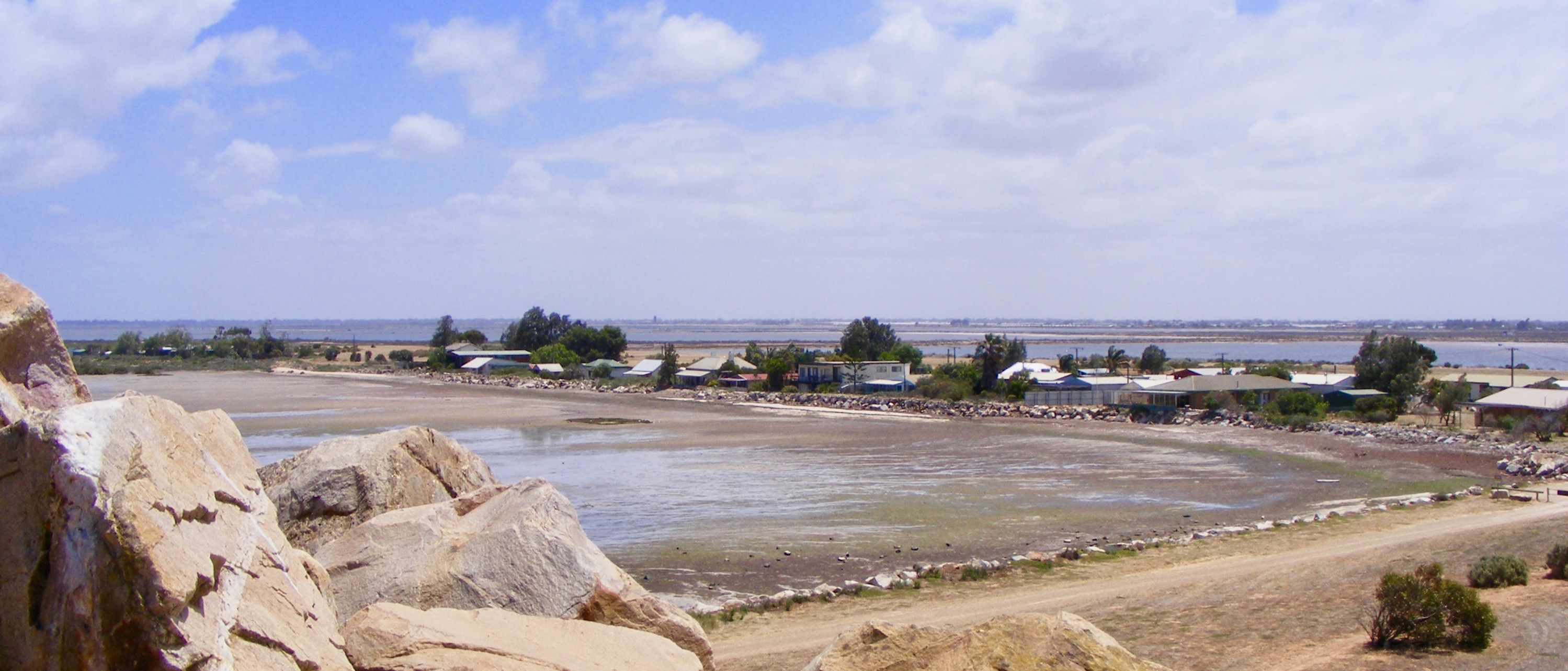
- Northern part of St Kilda township

- Coordinates: 34°44′19″S 138°32′05″E
- Country: Australia
- State: South Australia
- City: Adelaide
- LGA: City of Salisbury
- Location: 22 km (14 mi) from Adelaide city centre
- Established: 1893

Government
  - State electorate: Taylor
  - Federal division: Spence

Population
  - Total: 88 (SAL 2021)
- Postcode: 5110
- Mean max temp: 22.7 °C (72.9 °F)
- Mean min temp: 11.1 °C (52.0 °F)
- Annual rainfall: 430.1 mm (16.93 in)
Suburbs around St Kilda
Barker Inlet	Buckland Park	Waterloo Corner
Barker Inlet	St Kilda	Waterloo Corner; Bolivar
Barker Inlet	Bolivar	Bolivar
- Climate; Adjoining suburbs

St Kilda is a coastal hamlet, now classed as a suburb, 21 kilometres (13 miles) north-north-west of the centre of Adelaide, capital city of South Australia. With a population below 100 and a sole 4-kilometre (2.5-mile) road connecting to the nearest highway, its natural and built resources have remained relatively undisturbed. The seafront, containing a large area of mangroves, faces the Barker Inlet, which is part of the Port River estuarine area. St Kilda is an internationally recognised bird-watching area: more than 100 species (Note: The number of species noted in the reference is 100. On boardwalk signs the number (as of 2024) was stated as 200, and elsewhere as 150.) of birds feed in and around the mudflats, salt lagoons, mangroves and seagrass beds.

The inhabited section of the suburb occupies less than 100 hectares (250 acres) along the seafront. The remainder of the land was formerly used for extensive salt evaporation ponds, although now they are much fewer in number. The settlement ponds of the Bolivar Waste Water Treatment Plant occupy some of the southern end of the suburb. St Kilda is bordered by Buckland Park to the north, Waterloo Corner to the east-north-east, Bolivar to the south and south-east, and Gulf St Vincent to the west.

The suburb is home to a number of tourist attractions, including an adventure playground, tram museum, mangrove forest walk and an abundance of birdlife.

== History ==
=== Pre-colonial ===
Before the 1836 British colonisation of South Australia, the area was inhabited by the Kaurna people, who occupied the land from what is now Cape Jervis in the south, up the western side of the Fleurieu Peninsula, to Crystal Brook in the north, east to the Mount Lofty Ranges, across to Gulf Saint Vincent, including the Adelaide Plains and city of Adelaide. They called the Port River region and estuary Yerta Bulti, meaning "land of sleep or death".

The Kaurna people made much use of the estuarine area for hunting and gathering food and for materials which they made into artefacts and tools. They made use of the natural resources; for example, they would trap and spear fish (kuya), lobsters (ngaultaltya) and birds (parriparu), and gathered bird's eggs, black river mussels (kakirra, species Alathyria jacksoni), periwinkle (kulutunumi), river crawfish (kunggurla – probably common yabby), clams, native mud oysters and blue swimmer crabs. However, they did not kill the black swans, as this was taboo. The reeds, blue flax lily and rushes (probably Juncus kraussii, the salt marsh rush) were used for weaving baskets and nets – the latter used for not only fish, but game such as kangaroo and emu. Dolphins were known as yambo.

=== After European settlement ===
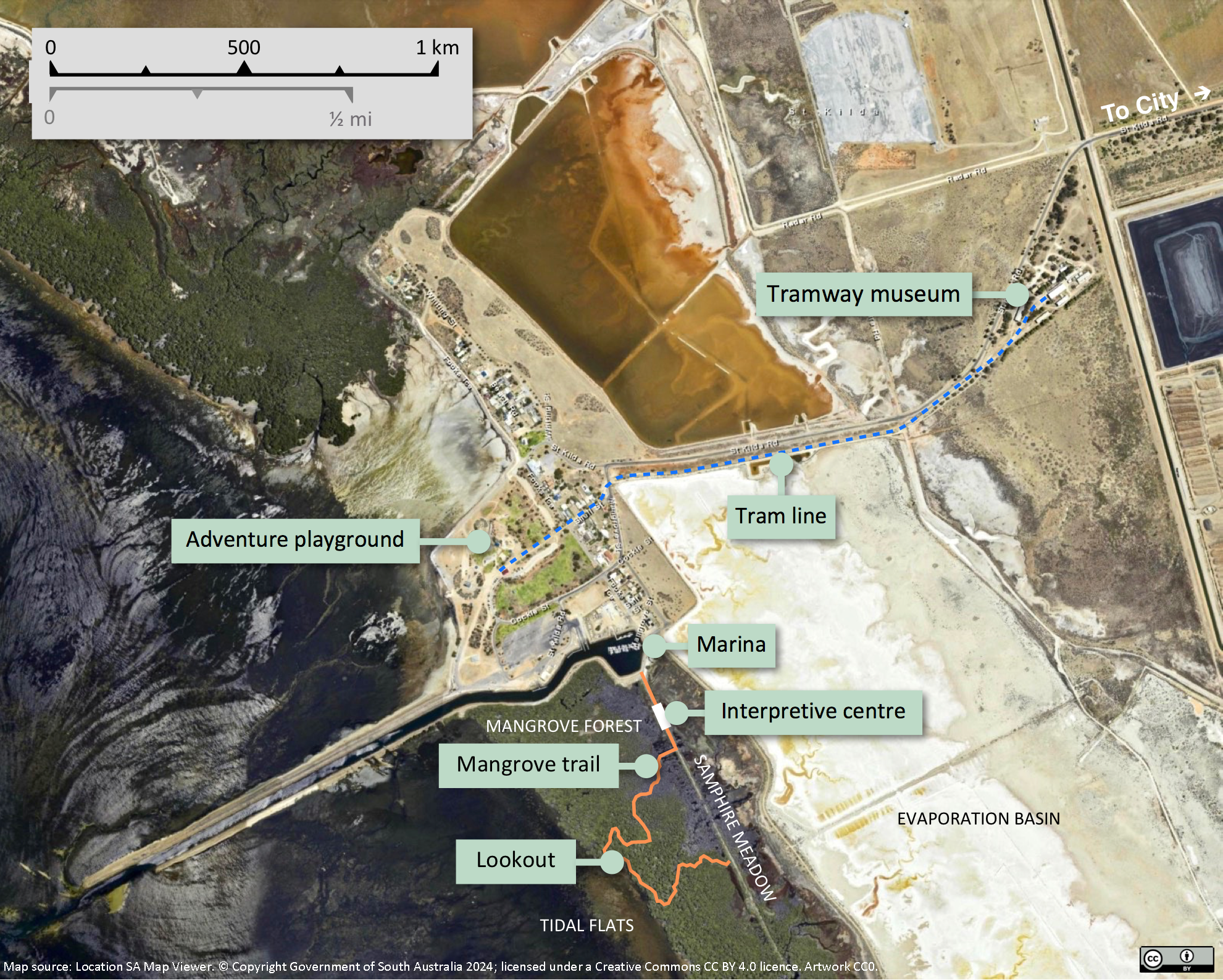
Main features of St Kilda

The "official" town of Saint Kilda was surveyed by T. Evans and proclaimed on 31 July 1873. Settler fishermen had established huts on three low-lying islands, covered in shell grit and saltbush and surrounded by mangrove and samphire swamps by 1865. By 1873, 13 huts and a boathouse were recorded. By the 1890s, people who lived in Adelaide were visiting the islands, attracted to the supposedly curative properties of the mangrove mud and using the beach for bathing and fishing for crabs. An early settler in the area was John Harvey, founder of the regional town of Salisbury, 10 kilometres (6 miles) inland. He gave the locality its name since it reminded him of the isolated St Kilda archipelago in the North Atlantic Ocean, which contains the westernmost islands of the Outer Hebrides of Scotland. Details of the origin of the name is here.

In 1886, governance of St Kilda was exercised by the Munno Para West District Council, which had been founded in 1854. St Kilda was proclaimed a town on 31 July 1893; sales of the first allotments occurred on the same day.

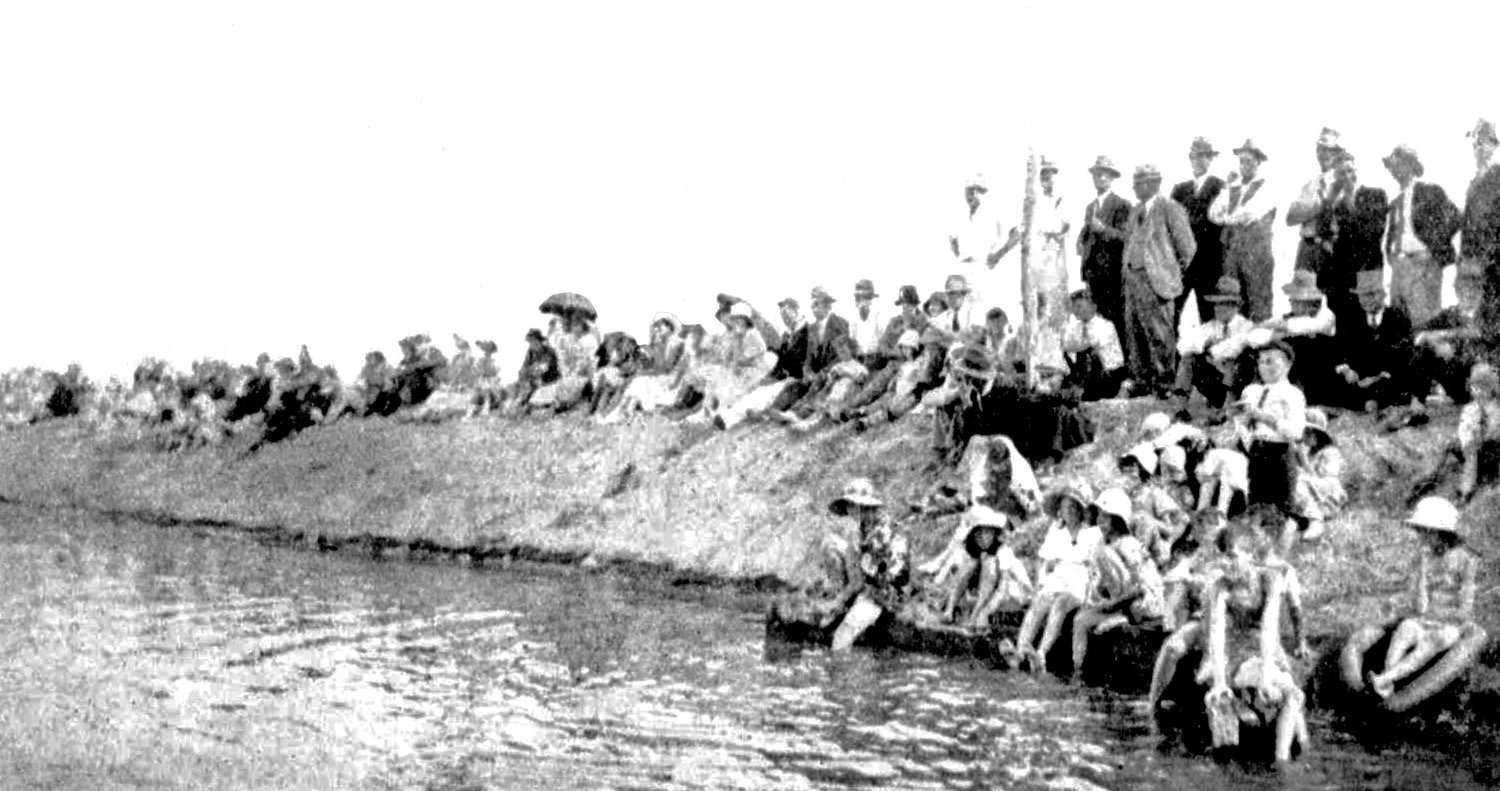
In 1934, a swimming pool was dug in the tidal beach

The St Kilda Hotel, built out of limestone obtained from the hills 15 kilometres (9 miles) eastwards, opened in 1898 with Matthias Lucas as the first publican. It remains the township's only hotel. A school opened in 1902, where the tram museum is now sited. It closed from 1917 to 1924 and finally closed permanently in 1949. Students were then moved to Salisbury North primary school; the timber building was eventually transported to Virginia primary school.

Together with most of the Munno Para West area, St Kilda came under the jurisdiction of the new District Council of Salisbury (later City of Salisbury) in 1933. After floods occurred in 1948 and 1957, the three islands present since the first European settlers arrived a century earlier were extensively modified. Salisbury Council began building up the area, expanding seawalls and reclaiming additional land by dumping earth spoil.

A major change to the landscape took place when construction of large salt evaporation lagoons began in 1935, (Note: 1935 date is from Taylor, E.; PIRSA cites 1940.) employing 600 workers to dig them out by hand. The company expanded the lagoons with mechanical equipment after World War II.

St Kilda's population has never been large: 50 non-permanent residents were counted in the 1901 census; 68 (including 20 "permanent") in 1911; 30 total residents in 1933; 80 in 2002; 70 (11 of whom were in families) in 2016; (Note: A note on the web page stated: "Median and average values may be affected by confidentiality in this area. Limited information has been provided because the area selected has a small population.") and 88 (18 of whom were in families) in 57 private dwellings in 2021. Many of the dwellings are insubstantial.

== Attractions and facilities ==
=== Adventure playground ===
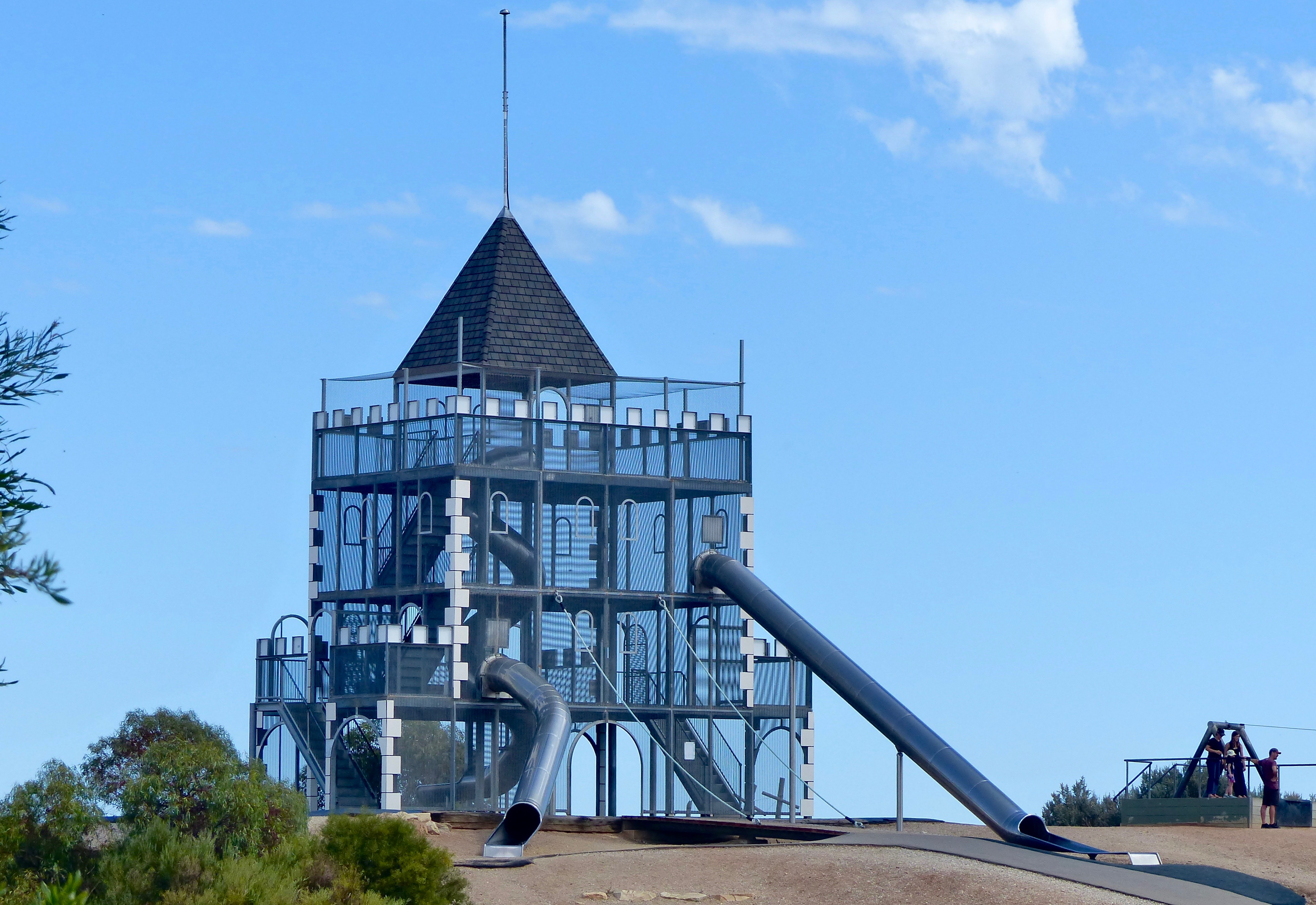

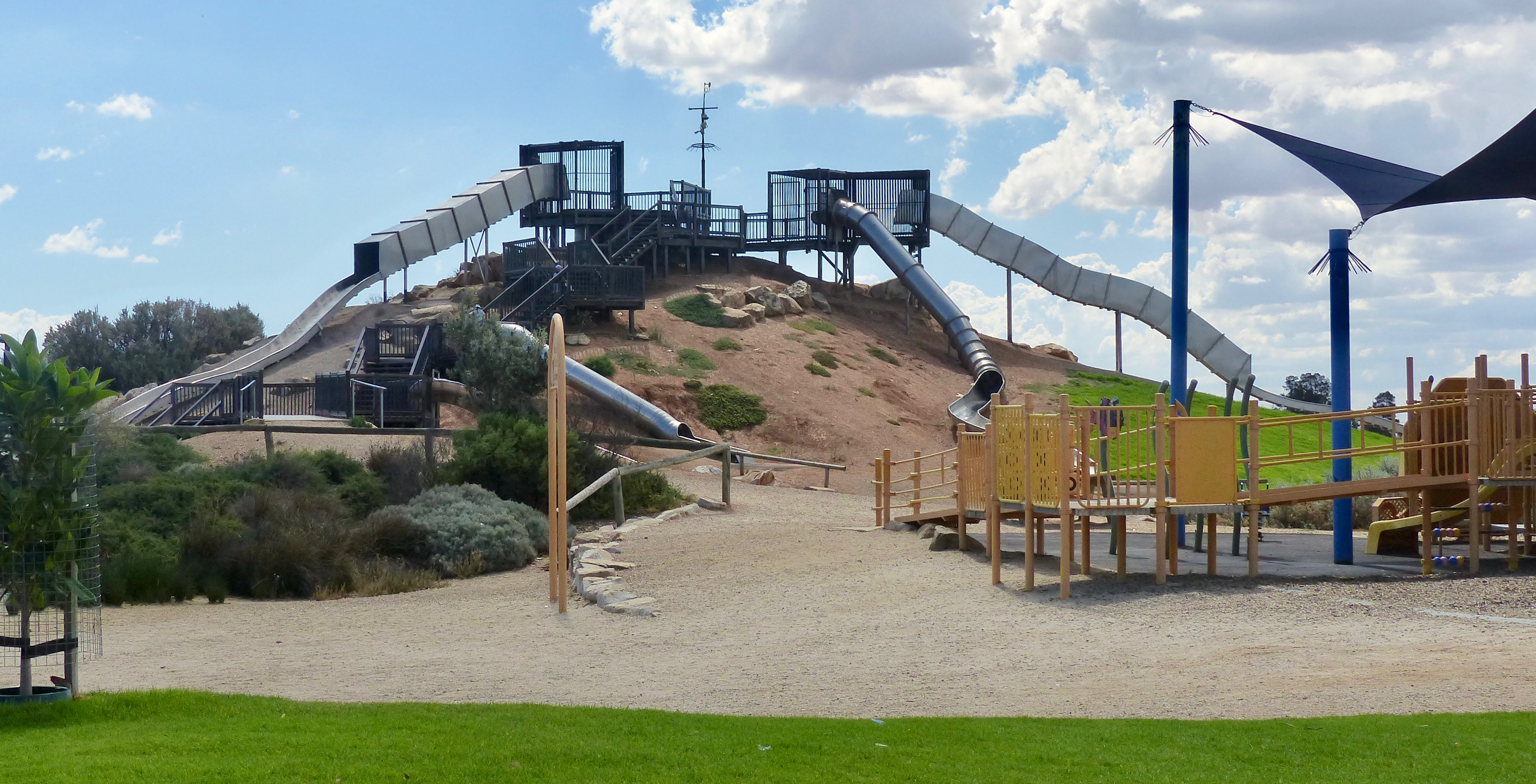

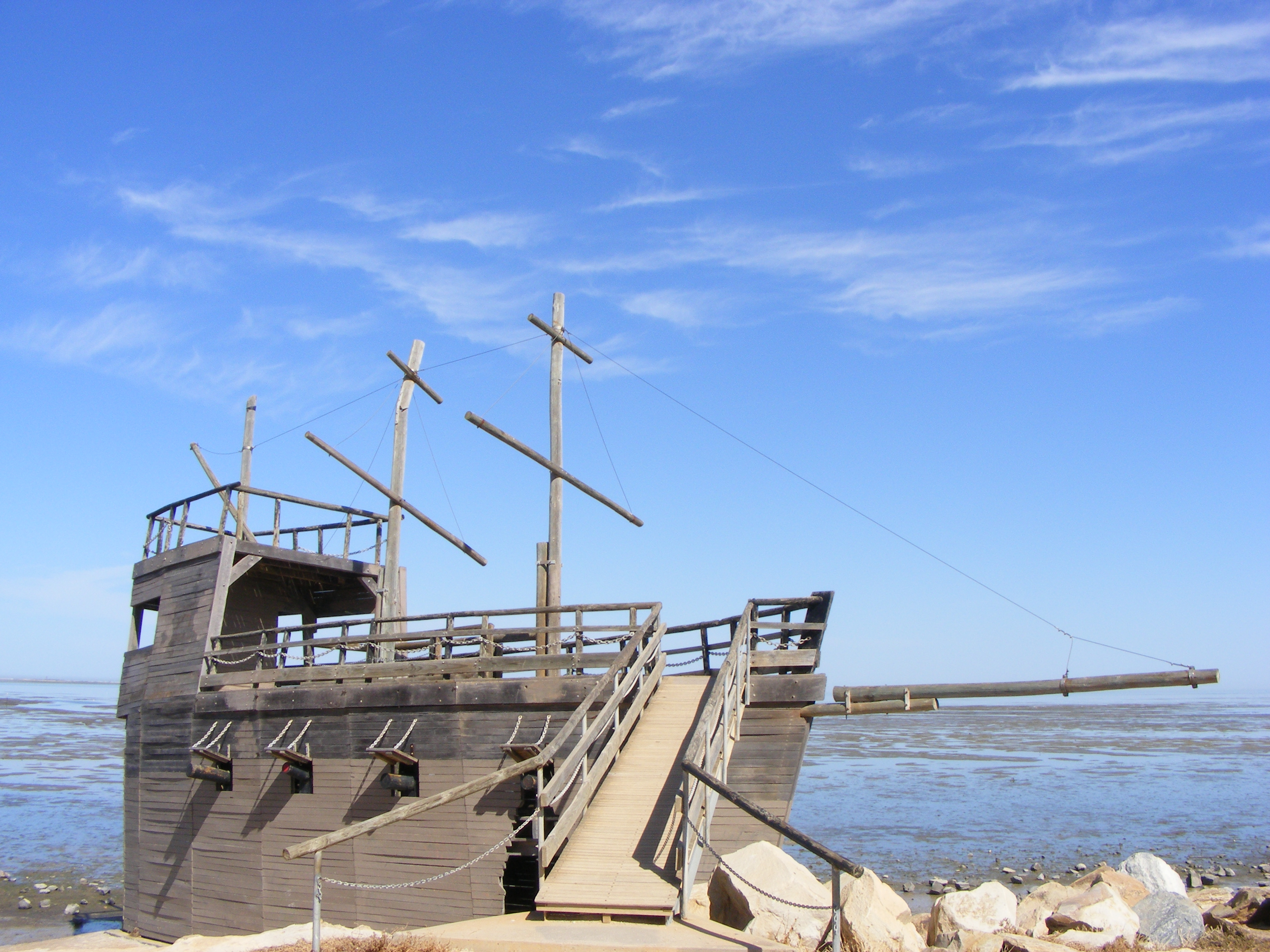

A castle at the playground (and zipwire on right)

Tunnels and slides at the playground "volcano"

A children's "pirate ship" on the waterfront

The St Kilda adventure playground, which covers 4 hectares (10 acres) at the seafront, has been voted by children as the best adventure park in South Australia. It has a "pirate" shipwreck, three-storey castle, tunnelled slides on a hill, flying foxes, a "bouncy boomerang" and numerous other pieces of play equipment. Shaded equipment and a small maze are enjoyed by younger children. Barbecue facilities, basketball courts and a dog-friendly exercise area are also provided.

The playground, opened in 1982 and upgraded in 2016, was initiated by the Lions Club of Salisbury and funded through club fund-raising activities, City of Salisbury council matching funding, and government employment schemes.

=== Tramway museum ===
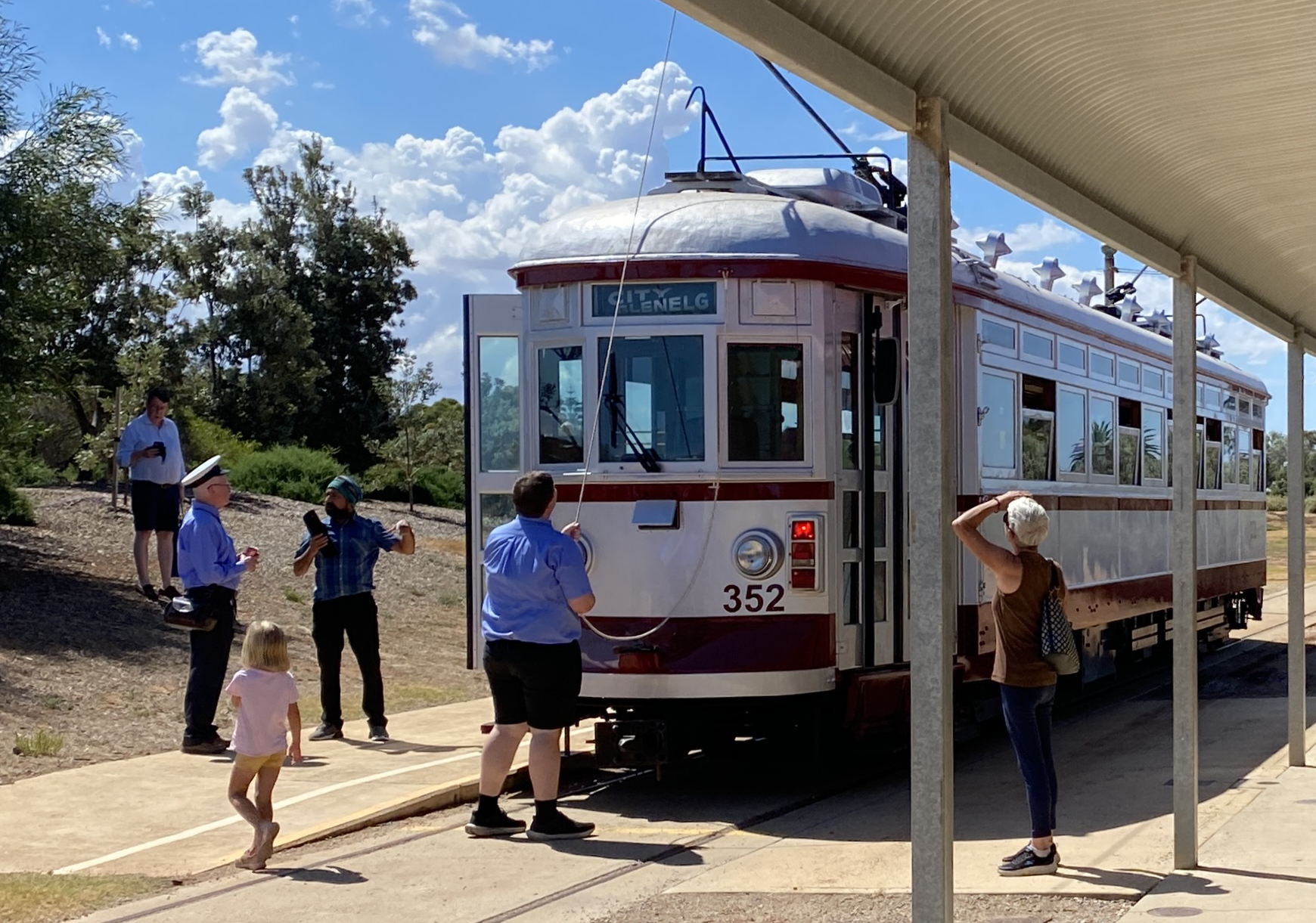
At the St Kilda adventure playground terminus, a restored 1929-vintage Glenelg tram is being prepared to take families to the nearby Tramway Museum. The museum, run by volunteers, has another 23 trams either on display or in operation.

Adelaide's tram museum is located at St Kilda on the site of the former primary school. It holds 24 electric trams, 2 horse trams and 5 trolleybuses that were used or built in Adelaide; most are restored and operational. The museum, which is open on Sundays and most public holidays from noon to 5 pm, is one of very few transport museums in the world to hold at least one example of every principal tram type to have been in service on a city street system. The entrance fee gives access to unlimited free rides on an electric tram along a 1.6 kilometres (1.0 mile) line that runs between the museum and the adventure playground.

=== Mangrove trail and interpretative centre ===
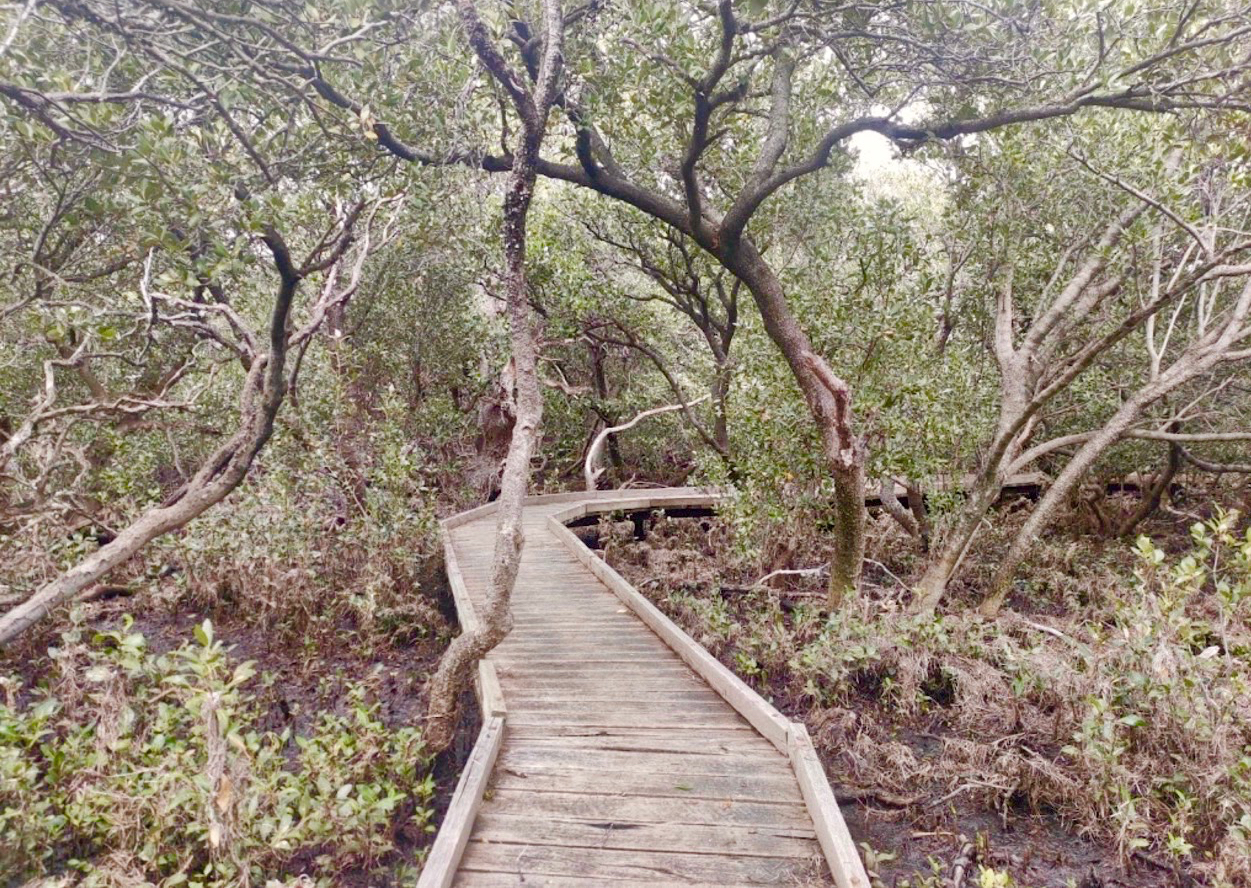
The boardwalk under the mangrove canopy

St Kilda is sited on a mangrove forest that borders Barker Inlet, part of the largest tidal estuary of Gulf St Vincent. Late in the 19th century, embankments were constructed through the mangroves to reclaim land for pasture. Subsequently, once the banks of the adjacent saltfields had been built, maintenance of the embankments ceased and the mangroves began to reclaim them. On one of the embankments is the Interpretative Centre, which gives insights into the flora, fauna and processes within the mangrove forest. From there, a 1.7 kilometres (1.1 mi) trail begins through a flooded mangrove forest, most of it on an elevated boardwalk. (Note: as of 2024, part of the trail was pending repairs. Instead of the loop, the trail ended at 1.25 kilometres (0.78 miles).) The trail meanders through tidal samphire saltmarsh flats, mangroves and seagrass channels to a lookout that provides elevated views across the Barker Inlet.

=== Boating and fishing ===
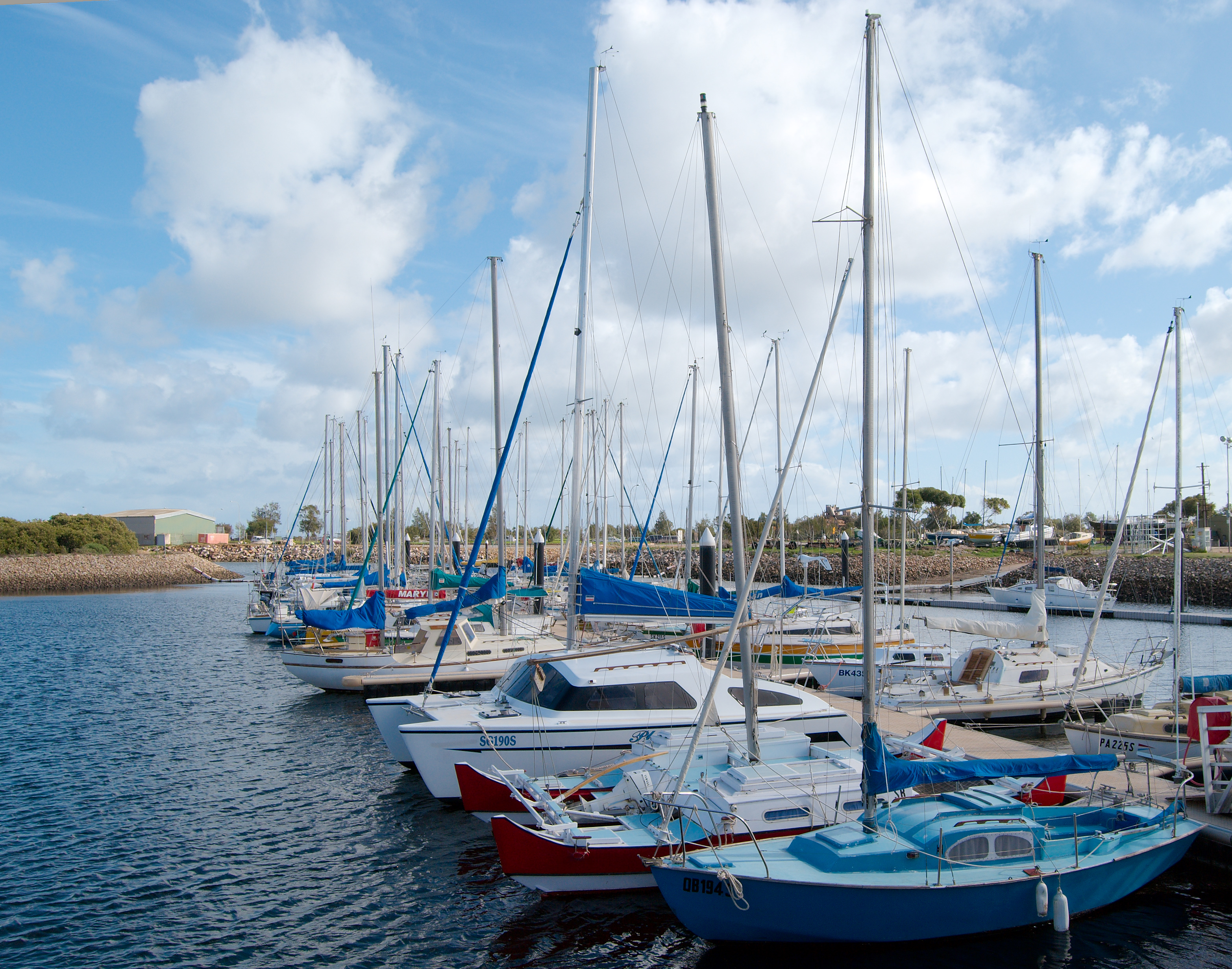
Boats in the marina

A marina with floating moorings for about 75 boats, some more than 10 metres (33 feet) long, and two boat ramps, is connected by a long sheltered channel to the Barker Inlet. Home to the long-established St Kilda Boat Club, it provides secure parking, slipping facilities and an electric mobility hoist for boarding boats.

The breakwater is popular for recreational fishing, especially for salmon trout, whiting (including King George whiting) and bream.

== Geography and environment ==
St Kilda is a flat, low-lying locality, mostly less than 2 metres (6 ft 7 in) above sea level. Although once dominated by extensive salt crystallisation lagoons, many of the saltfields have closed, and land and water rehabilitation has been undertaken. Extensive treatment ponds of SA Water's Bolivar waste water treatment plant lie to the south.

=== Salt fields ===
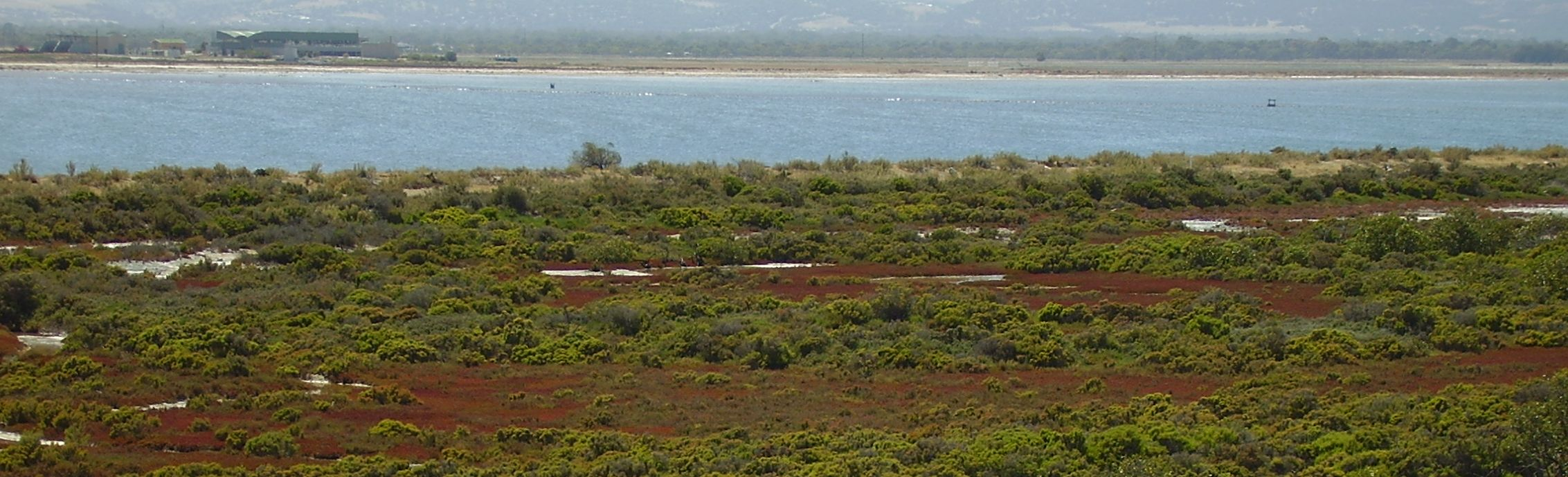
Salt lagoon beyond the samphire saltflats

The coast side of the mangroves is bounded by extensive salt evaporation ponds leased for industrial use by the South Australian Government. Today, most of these saltfields are no longer used. The Department of the Premier and Cabinet is responsible for regulating the salt fields under the Mining Act 1972, which includes a requirement for environment protection and rehabilitation.

ICI Australia Ltd began salt production at Dry Creek in 1940 and an associated soda ash plant at nearby Osborne. The company sold the operations to Penrice Soda Products in 1989. In 2006, when more saltfields were in production than now, they were described as covering about 4000 hectares (9884 acres). Salt water was pumped from the sea at two pumping stations, 20 km (12 mi) and 30 km (19 mi) north along the coast from the final crystallising area. Harvested salt was redissolved and pumped as brine to Osborne for manufacture of soda ash by the Solvay process. Production in 1999 was 391,000 tonnes (385,000 long tons). Penrice Soda Products ceased operations at its Osborne chemical plant in 2014 when it went into receivership.

In 2020, a South Australian government inspection observed that significant areas of mangrove had died off and that brine had recently been pumped into the saltfields by plant management company, Buckland Dry Creek Pty Ltd. The pumping occurred after six years in which the lagoons had been allowed to dry out. As of November 2020, a conclusion had not been reached about the cause, and a senior departmental official noted that the pumping occurred downstream from where the dieback occurred.

== Flora and fauna ==
=== Flora ===
The mangroves found on the coastline of St Kilda consist of a single species, Avicennia marina var resinifera. In the upper intertidal zone, mangroves become smaller the closer they are to land. They give way to a variety of samphire species, including beaded glasswort (Tecticornia flabelliformis) and blackseed glasswort (Tecticornia pergranulata) as well as saltbush on the saltflats of the supratidal zone. Nitre bush grows on the highest parts of the seawall and the abundant summer fruits provide food for birds.

=== Fauna ===
St Kilda is part of a nursery area for many of the commercially important fish and crustaceans in South Australia, including King George whiting, western king prawns and blue swimmer crabs. There are brown snakes and skinks in dense bushes along the top of the embankments.

Each year in late summer, thousands of black swans and ducks descend on the area as the inland waterways they inhabit dry up. Waterbirds such as pelicans, cormorants, oyster catchers and terns are common, often year-round. Egrets, ibis, herons and spoonbills feed on the seagrass and fairy wrens, chats, fantails and thornbills feed on insects and plants among the samphire. Every September, stints and sandpipers arrive from the Northern Hemisphere in a spectacular display. The abundance of birdlife attracts birds of prey: swamp harriers, collared sparrowhawks, black-shouldered kites, kestrels and little falcons are all seen in the skies over St Kilda.

The salt lagoons, mangroves and samphire wetlands are recognised as important areas for migratory birds by their inclusion in treaties created to protect birds and their environment: the China-Australia and Japan-Australia migratory bird agreements.

=== Protected areas ===
St Kilda and its aquatic and terrestrial surrounds are exceptionally well endowed. As a result, the waters and shorelines of St Kilda are part of several overlapping protected areas:

- Adelaide Dolphin Sanctuary
- Barker Inlet – St Kilda Aquatic Reserve
- Gulf St Vincent Important Bird Area
- St Kilda – Chapman Creek Aquatic Reserve
- the proposed Adelaide International Bird Sanctuary National Park.

== Transport ==
St Kilda is badly served by public transport: the nearest bus stop (stop 63 on the Adelaide Metro 402 bus route) is 4.6 kilometres (2.9 miles) from the tramway museum and 6.3 kilometres (3.9 miles) from the playground.

== Weather ==
The region has a Mediterranean climate, with St Kilda being slightly hotter and drier than the average climate of Adelaide. Based on past data, summer daytime temperatures may be expected to exceed 40 degrees Celsius (104 degrees Fahrenheit) on four days of the year and nighttime temperatures in winter may be expected to drop below 0 degrees Celsius (32 degrees Fahrenheit) on one day, although generally the winter is mild with moderate rainfall.

The following graphs show climate data for RAAF Base Edinburgh, 10 kilometres (6.2 miles) inland from St Kilda. (Data are also available for the Bolivar Treatment Works, 5.7 kilometres (3.5 miles) to the south and 1.6 kilometres (1.0 mile) inland, but only in respect of rainfall.)

RAAF Base Edinburgh

Climate chart (precipitation, max. and min. temperature)
J	F	M	A	M	J	J	A	S	O	N	D
21 30 17	17 30 17	23 27 15	31 23 12	47 19 9	53 16 7	52 15 6	50 17 7	47 19 8	37 22 10	26 26 13	25 28 15
- █ Average max. and min. temperatures in °C
- █ Precipitation totals in mm
- Source: Bureau of Meteorology
Imperial conversion
J	F	M	A	M	J	J	A	S	O	N	D
0.8 86 62	0.7 86 62	0.9 81 58	1.2 74 53	1.8 66 49	2.1 61 44	2 60 43	2 62 44	1.8 66 47	1.5 72 50	1 78 55	1 82 59
- █ Average max. and min. temperatures in °F
- █ Precipitation totals in inches
