= 2014 Adelaide heatwave =

Weather event in Adelaide, Australia

The 2014 Adelaide heatwave was a heat wave that occurred in Adelaide, South Australia in both January and February 2014. The heatwaves were so strong that it broke records, becoming the hottest summer ever recorded in Adelaide. Although there were no deaths directly linked to the heatwave as of 2015, there were at least 136 heat-related hospital admissions recorded.

14 January was the 4th hottest day recorded in Adelaide, at 45.1 °C (113.2 °F).

== Statistics ==
Adelaide's record breaking temperatures during the heatwaves:

- Hottest February day – 44.7 °C (112.5 °F) on 2 February 2014. Roseworthy recorded 46 °C, the second year in which Roseworthy reached such a temperature.
- Record number of days exceeding 40 °C (104 °F) during the summer months (December, January and February) – 13.
- Record number of days exceeding 42 °C (108 °F) during a calendar year - 9.
- Record number of consecutive days exceeding 42 °C (108 °F) – 5.

== See also ==
- Climate of Adelaide
- Heat wave
- Climate change in Australia
