= Adelaide International Bird Sanctuary National Park =

Bird habitat protection area in South Australia

- IUCN category VI (protected area with sustainable use of natural resources)
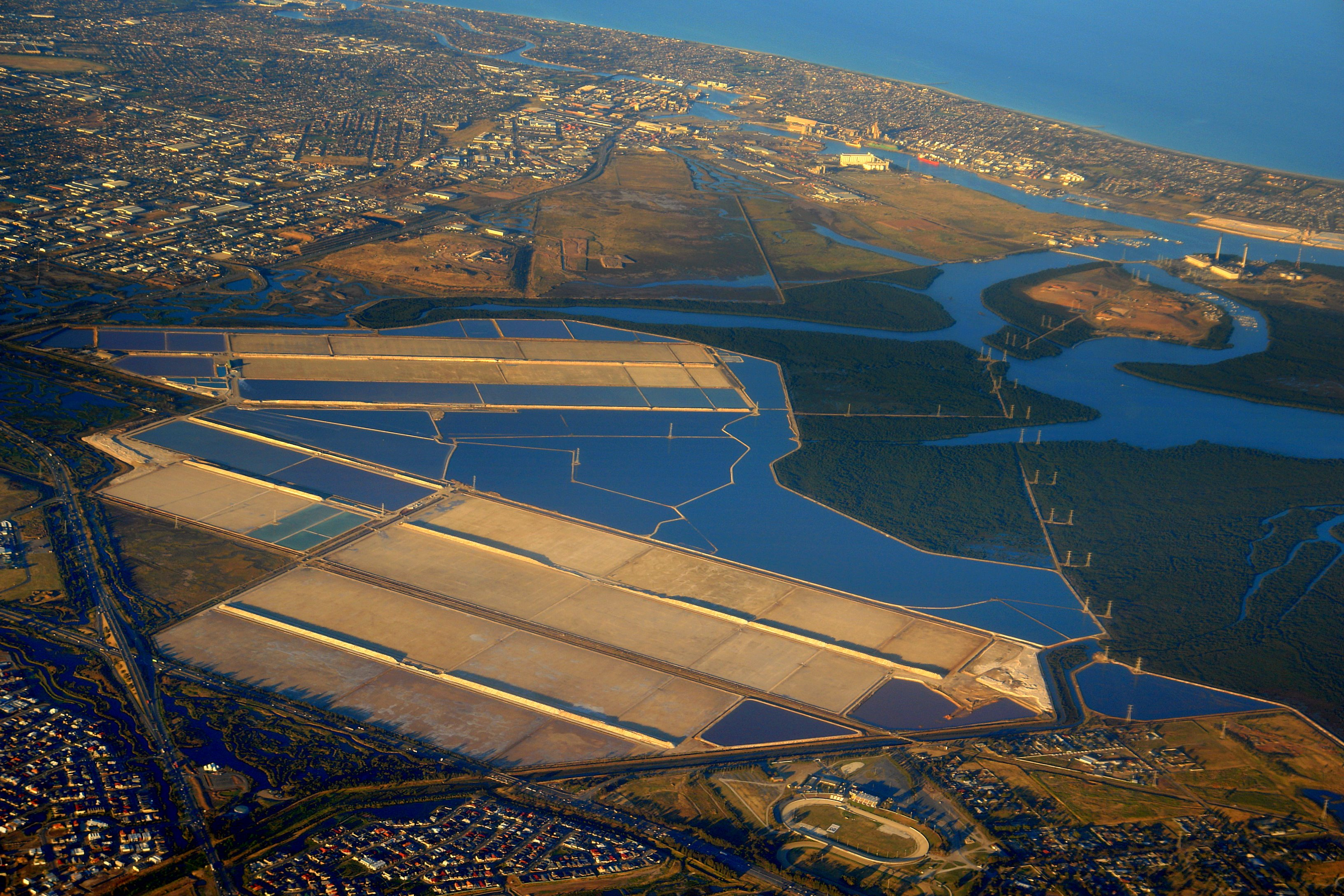
- The mangrove forest area on the right is the southernmost tip of the national park (2008)

- Location within South Australia
- Location: South Australia
- Coordinates: 34°35′40″S 138°23′54″E
- Established: 27 October 2016
- Governing body: Department of Environment and Water
- Website: http://www.environment.sa.gov.au/parks/Find_a_Park/Browse_by_region/Adelaide/adelaide-international-bird-sanctuary-national-park

The Adelaide International Bird Sanctuary National Park (Winaityinaityi Pangkara, pronounced "Wee-nay-chi-nay-chi pan-ker-a" in the indigenous Kaurna language, meaning "country belonging to all birds") is a protected area in South Australia established by the South Australian government on the northeast coast of Gulf St Vincent, between Parham in the north and the southern end of Barker Inlet (part of the Port River estuary) in the south. Its purpose is to rehabilitate land used as salt pans, protect habitat for international migratory shorebirds, manage water quality in adjoining parts of Gulf St Vincent, create "green" space, develop niche tourism and create opportunities for indigenous people.

This very low-gradient, low-energy coastline, containing a broad lateral extent of subtidal seagrass meadows, intertidal mangroves and supratidal saltmarshes and salinas, extends from the Adelaide metropolitan area as far as the head of Gulf St Vincent, and is also known as the "Samphire Coast". The coastline north of Parham, outside the proposed sanctuary, also has a high degree of protection through being in the Port Wakefield Proof and Experimental Establishment, and the Clinton Conservation Park.

== Key objectives ==
The Adelaide International Bird Sanctuary is a protected area established by the SA government for the northeast coast of Gulf St Vincent extending from Adelaide to its immediate north with the view of achieving the five key outcomes:

1. Protection of habitat particularly used by shorebirds that migrate over large extents of the Earth's surface.
2. Management of water quality in Gulf St Vincent particularly in respect to stormwater and wastewater produced in the northern suburbs of Adelaide and its treatment prior to release into Gulf St Vincent.
3. Creation of "green" space on the fringes of the northern Adelaide Plains that will allow stormwater recycling, absorb carbon dioxide and enhance the amenity and attractiveness of the region.
4. Tourism development that provide opportunities for developing exclusive, high-end tourism experiences with a focus on national and international birdwatchers.
5. Indigenous involvement via measures to employ and engage Aboriginal people and use Indigenous knowledge to develop and implement environmental and cultural heritage education and interpretation programs.

A driver for the proposal is the need to rehabilitate land previously used at Dry Creek, St Kilda and other localities as salt pans and managing the environmental risks arising from the cessation of the salt evaporation process, such as exposing of acid sulphate soils.

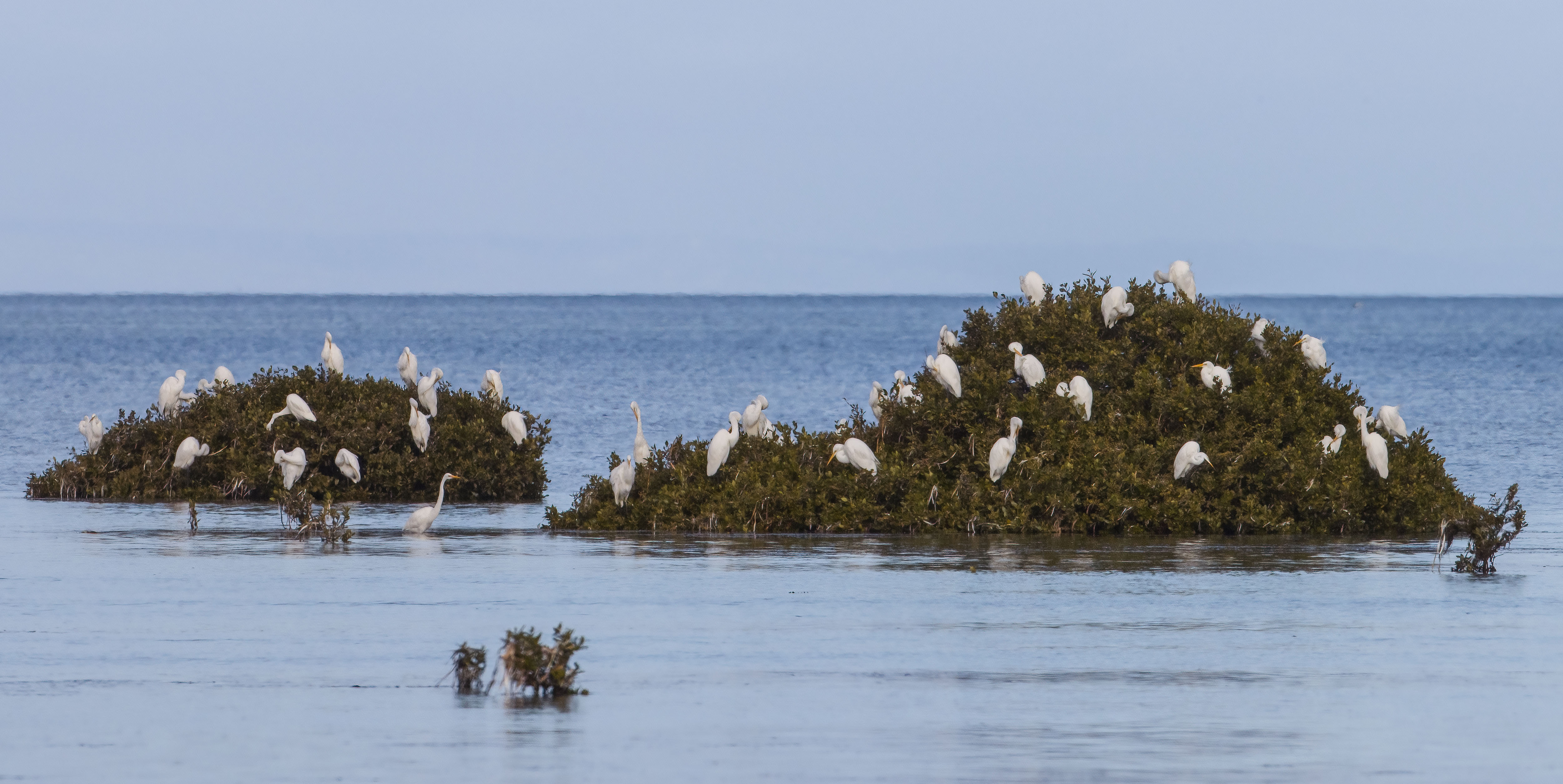
The park attracts many Eastern Great Egrets to roost

== Extent and establishment ==
The broader Adelaide International Bird Sanctuary extends from Barker Inlet in the south to Parham in the north over a distance of 60 kilometres (37 miles) along the coast. Its adjoins or includes other existing protected areas such as the Port Gawler and Torrens Island conservation parks, the Upper Gulf St Vincent Marine Park, the Barker Inlet-St Kilda Aquatic Reserve, the St Kilda – Chapman Creek Aquatic Reserve and the Adelaide Dolphin Sanctuary.

The sanctuary also includes 228 hectares (560 acres) of land that adjoins the Port Gawler Conservation Park and Buckland Park lake, which was purchased in 2013 by the SA government with financial contributions from Nature Foundation SA and Birds SA. In 2014 the sanctuary was proclaimed a conservation park under the National Parks and Wildlife Act 1972, to "provide one of the highest levels of protection allowed for by state legislation".

The sanctuary is one of the southern destinations of the East Asian-Australasian Flyway (EAAF), with around 27,000 migratory shorebirds feeding and fattening up in the area over the austral summer, before returning to the northern hemisphere to breed during the boreal summer.

The South Australian government committed to the proposal at the state election held in March 2014 and the 2014–15 state budget included expenditure of A$300,000 to commence work.

In August 2014, the government announced it had purchased, for A$2 million, 2300 hectares (5700 acres) of land formerly held by salt operators, but undeveloped. The government also committed to spend A$1.7 million over 4 years for the sanctuary's establishment and maintenance, with planned completion in 2018.

Land in the localities of Windsor, Dublin and Lower Light was proclaimed as a national park under South Australia's National Parks and Wildlife Act 1972 in 2016.

== Ecology and birdlife ==
=== Habitats ===
The coast around the national park contains a range of coastal and wetlands habitats, that includes mangroves, saltmarshes, mudflats and other intertidal environments. These habitats provide feeding and roosting areas for shorebirds and support other native flora and fauna. Food sources include worms, small molluscs and other marine life found in the shallow waters and the mudflats. Between the pools of water are many earth-banks that protect the birds from strong winds, as well as clumps of tall grasses for shelter and nesting. On occasion many hundreds of birds will nest in the one swamp.

The coastal landscape is part of the area commonly known as the Samphire Coast. Its habitats are important to migratory shorebirds and are connected to other coastal reserves and wetlands around Gulf St Vincent.

=== Migratory birds ===
The broader sanctuary lies at the southern end of the East Asian- Australasian Flyway, a major migratory route used by birds travelling between Australia and New Zealand and northern breeding areas in Asia and the Arctic. The South Australian Government identifies the sanctuary as an important feeding and roosting area for migratory shorebirds.

=== Birds identified ===
Some of the birds identified at the sanctuary:

- Curlew sandpiper
- Eastern curlew
- Eastern great egrets
- Ruddy turnstone
- Red knot
- Silver gulls
- Caspian tern

== Management ==
The national park is managed by the South Australian Government through the National Parks and Wildlife Service. Management planning addresses the protection of biodiversity, coastal habitats, cultural heritage and opportunities for public recreation and edution.

Kaurna people are the Traditional Owners of the Adelaide Plains and have longstanding cultural connections with the lands and waters of the sanctuary. The South Australian Government identifies Kaurna knowledge and participation as important in the planning and management of the wider bird sanctuary.

=== Avian influenza ===
Highly pathogenic avian influenza, commonly known as bird flu, is a disease that can affect wild birds and domestic poultry. Migratory birds are one of the factors considered in international and Australian surveillance for avian influenza.

In October 2026, the South Australian Government reported confirmed H5 bird-flu events in wild birds across the state. It's update of 15 October recorded 331 confirmed events, including a detection involving a Pacific gull at Port Hughes on Yorke Peninsula. At this stage avian influenza has not been detected within Adelaide International Bird Sanctuary National Park.

== See also ==
- Gulf St Vincent Important Bird Area
- List of protected areas in Adelaide
- East Asian–Australasian Flyway
