= Barker Inlet – St Kilda Aquatic Reserve =

Protected area in South Australia

- IUCN category VI (protected area with sustainable use of natural resources)
- Location within South Australia
- Location: South Australia
- Nearest city: Port Adelaide.
- Coordinates: 34.7836°S 138.5454°E
- Area: 29.60 km^{2} (11.43 sq mi)
- Established: 23 August 1973
- Governing body: Primary Industries and Regions SA (PIRSA)

Barker Inlet – St Kilda Aquatic Reserve is a marine protected area in the Australian state of South Australia located in waters adjoining the east coast of Gulf St Vincent in Barker Inlet about 16 kilometres (9.9 mi) north of the state capital of Adelaide.

The aquatic reserve covers the extent of the Barker Inlet to the south of the St Kilda boat channel as well as two natural channels, the Angas Inlet and the east part of the North Arm, and land subject to tidal inundation on the east side of Torrens Island, all sides of Garden Island and in the suburbs of Gillman, Dry Creek, Bolivar and St Kilda (from west to east). It is bounded to its immediate north by the St Kilda – Chapman Creek Aquatic Reserve.

The reserve, which is classified as an IUCN Category VI protected area, was declared in 1973 for the purpose of "conservation of mangrove seagrass communities and for the protection of nursery areas for several important commercial and recreational species, including the western king prawn, King George whiting, yellowfin whiting and blue swimmer crabs for fisheries management". Permitted activities are boating, removal of fish by rod and line or handline and collection of blood worms for bait by use of a hand net. It shares territory with the Adelaide Dolphin Sanctuary, the Adelaide International Bird Sanctuary and the Torrens Island Conservation Park.

== See also ==
- Protected areas of South Australia
- List of protected areas in Adelaide
