= St Kilda – Chapman Creek Aquatic Reserve =

Protected area in South Australia

- IUCN category VI (protected area with sustainable use of natural resources)
- Location within South Australia
- Location: South Australia
- Nearest city: Port Adelaide
- Coordinates: 34.7032°S 138.4729°E
- Area: 14.25 km^{2} (5.50 sq mi)
- Established: 1 January 1971
- Governing body: Primary Industries and Regions SA (PIRSA)

St Kilda – Chapman Creek Aquatic Reserve is a marine protected area in the Australian state of South Australia located in waters on the east coast of Gulf St Vincent adjoining the suburbs of Buckland Park and St Kilda about 24.8 kilometres (15.4 mi) north of the state capital of Adelaide.

It extends from the St Kilda boat channel, being the north boundary of the Barker Inlet-St Kilda Aquatic Reserve, located in Barker Inlet on the south to Chapman Creek in the north and includes land subject to tidal inundation in both Buckland Park and St Kilda.

It was declared in 1980 for the purpose of “the conservation of mangrove seagrass communities and the protection of nursery areas for major commercial and recreational fish species” and to provide “buffer area between commercial fishing activity and the Barker Inlet Aquatic Reserve (sic)”. Permitted Activities include use of boats, the removal of fish by rod and line or handline and the collecting of blood worms for bait by use of a hand net.

It shares territory with the following protected areas - the Adelaide Dolphin Sanctuary and the Adelaide International Bird Sanctuary.

The aquatic reserve is classified as an IUCN Category VI protected area.

== See also ==
- Protected areas of South Australia
- List of protected areas in Adelaide
