= Climate of Adelaide =

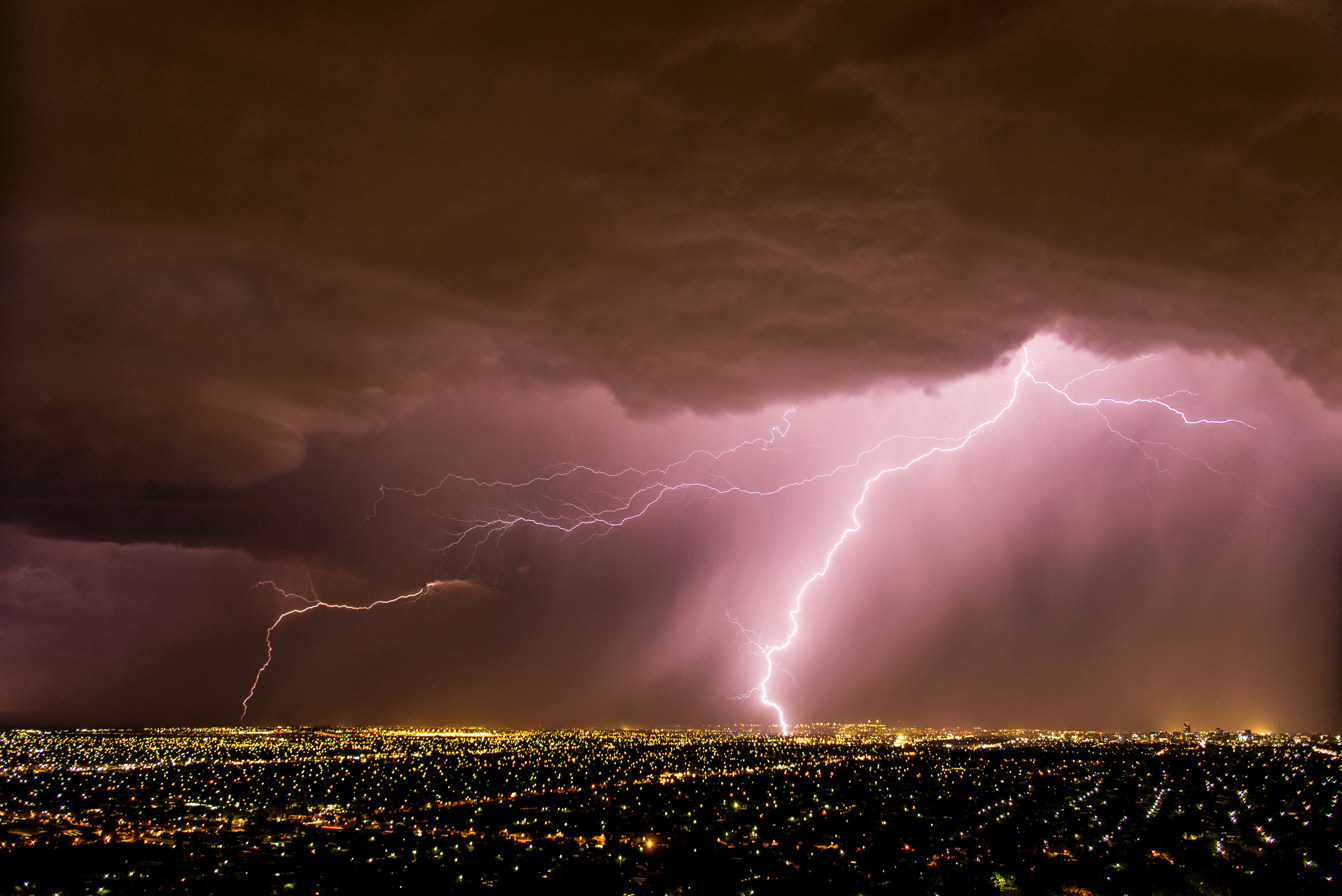
A spring storm over Adelaide

Adelaide, the capital city of South Australia, has a Mediterranean climate (Köppen climate classification Csa), with wet, cool winters and hot dry summers.

== Seasonal variation ==
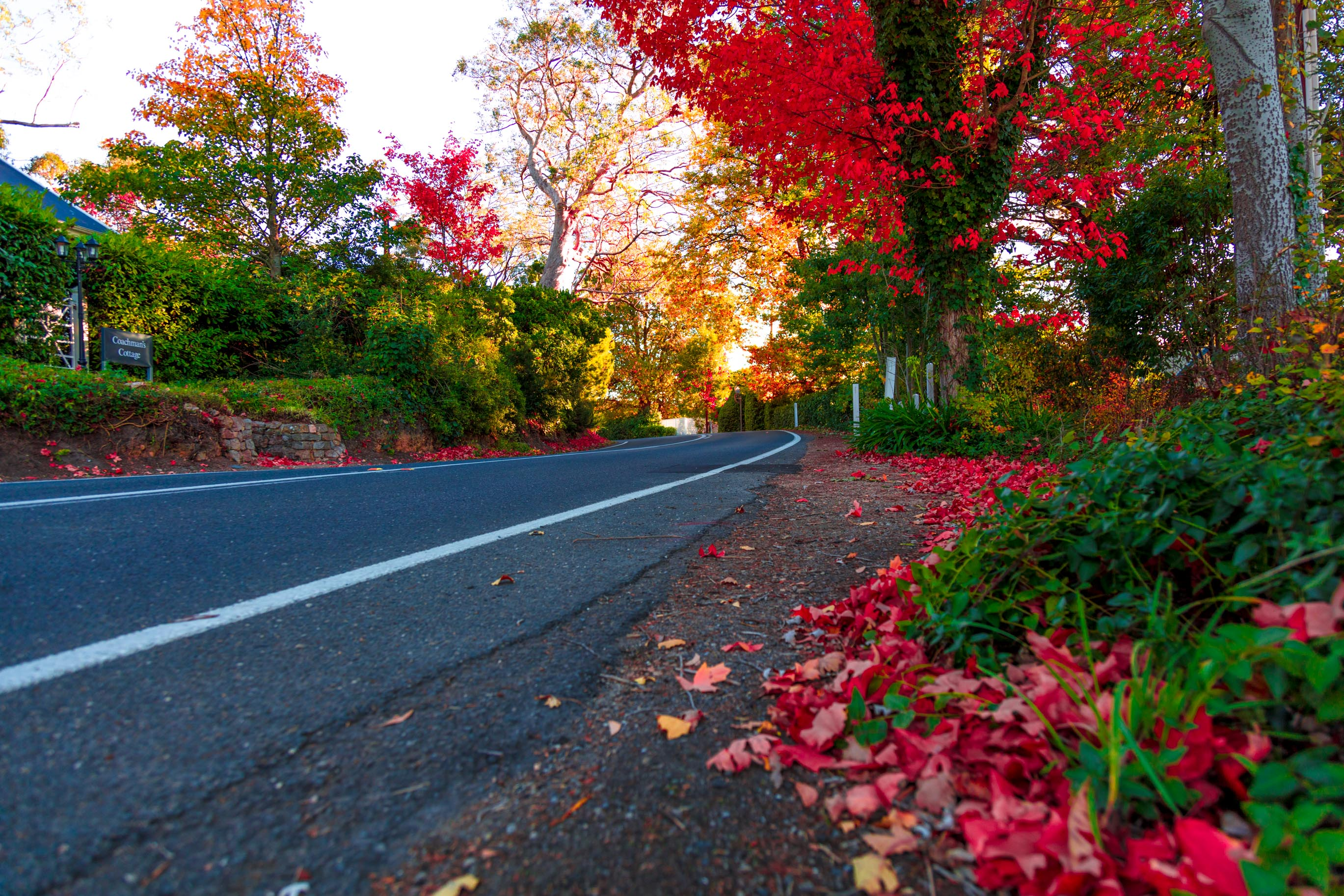
Autumn (March–May) in the Adelaide Hills. The hills are generally a few degrees cooler than the Adelaide Plains and attract tourists in autumn for the colourful display of autumn foliage.

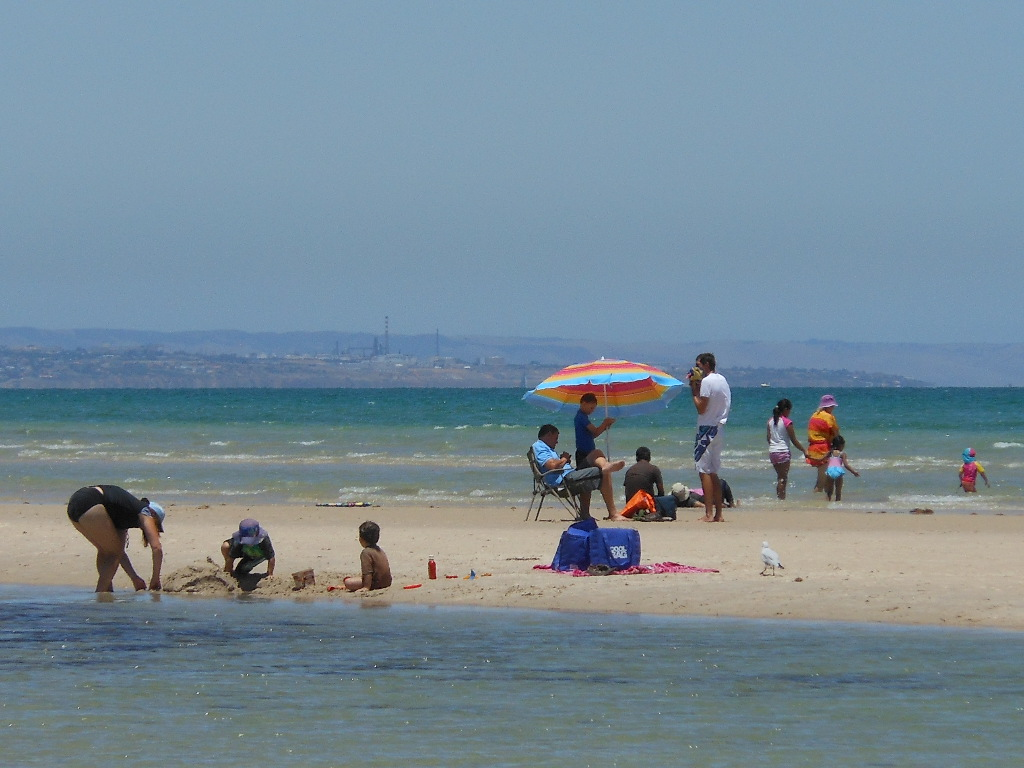
Grange Beach in summer

=== Summer (December to February) ===
In summer the average minimum is around 15.2 to 16.8 °C (59.4 to 62.2 °F) and the average maximum is around 26.4 to 28.6 °C (79.5 to 83.5 °F), but there is considerable variation and Adelaide can usually expect several days a year where temperatures reach the mid/high 30s to low 40s (95 to 114 °F). On a few rare occasions the temperature has reached the mid to high 40s (115 to 120 °F). These high temperatures usually occur when hot northerly winds blow hot air down south from central Australia, causing the temperature to spike. However, like Melbourne, the summer weather can be rather changeable, as it is not uncommon to have summer days where the temperature peaks in the low 20s due to a cool south-westerly airmass off the Southern Ocean. Occasionally, the high may remain below 20 degrees, even in the peak of summer.

Rainfall is unreliable, light and infrequent throughout summer. The average in January and February is around 20 millimetres or 0.8 inches, but completely rainless months are by no means uncommon.

=== Autumn (March – May) ===
In autumn, the weather is generally mild (though warm in March). Average minimum temperatures vary between 14.8 and 9.9 °C (58.6 and 49.8 °F), while maxima vary between 25.6 and 18.7 °C (78.1 and 65.7 °F).

There is very little rainfall until late autumn.

=== Winter (June to August) ===
After a snowstorm at Lobethal, a town in the Adelaide Hills, 28 July 1901.

In winter the average maximum is around 15.2 to 16.1 °C (59.4 to 61.0 °F) and the average minimum around 7.4 to 8 °C (45.3 to 46.4 °F), although temperatures again can fluctuate. Note though that the temperature rarely drops below freezing or rises above 19 °C. Frosts are common in the valleys of the Adelaide Hills, but rare elsewhere. Winter in Adelaide also sees quite a significant wind chill, which makes the apparent temperature seem colder than it actually is.

Winter has fairly reliable rainfall with June being the wettest month of the year, averaging around 80 millimetres or 3 inches. The city's dry summers are attributed to the Australian High on the Great Australian Bight.

The coldest temperature ever recorded in Adelaide is −2.6 °C (27.3 °F), on 8 June 1982 at Adelaide Airport. However, due to its elevation, Mount Lofty has a disputed record low of −5 °C (23 °F) on 17 July 1970.

=== Spring (September – November) ===
Like Autumn, spring weather is mild, but with greater variation. Average maximum temperatures vary between 18.7 and 24.5 °C (65.7 and 76.1 °F). Despite the warmer days, with little cloud cover, overnight temperatures can drop quickly, minima varying between 9.4 and 13.6 °C.

Rainfall tapers off quickly from winter into spring.

== Climate data ==
The weather station used for Adelaide's official temperatures was the West Terrace station from 1871 to 1977, and since 2017; and was the Kent Town station from 1977 to 2017; however the table below is for Adelaide Airport.

Climate data for Adelaide Airport M.O. (1991–2020 averages, 1887–2025 extremes (Note: Extreme temperature readings are taken additionally from Adelaide (West Terrace) - site no. 023000))
Month	Jan	Feb	Mar	Apr	May	Jun	Jul	Aug	Sep	Oct	Nov	Dec	Year
Record high °C (°F)	46.6 (115.9)	43.6 (110.5)	41.8 (107.2)	36.9 (98.4)	32.3 (90.1)	26.1 (79.0)	25.9 (78.6)	29.9 (85.8)	35.1 (95.2)	38.9 (102.0)	43.1 (109.6)	45.3 (113.5)	46.6 (115.9)
Mean daily maximum °C (°F)	28.6 (83.5)	28.4 (83.1)	25.6 (78.1)	22.5 (72.5)	18.7 (65.7)	16.0 (60.8)	15.2 (59.4)	16.1 (61.0)	18.7 (65.7)	21.7 (71.1)	24.5 (76.1)	26.4 (79.5)	21.9 (71.4)
Daily mean °C (°F)	22.7 (72.9)	22.6 (72.7)	20.2 (68.4)	17.3 (63.1)	14.3 (57.7)	12.0 (53.6)	11.3 (52.3)	11.9 (53.4)	14.1 (57.4)	16.4 (61.5)	19.1 (66.4)	20.8 (69.4)	16.9 (62.4)
Mean daily minimum °C (°F)	16.8 (62.2)	16.8 (62.2)	14.8 (58.6)	12.1 (53.8)	9.9 (49.8)	8.0 (46.4)	7.4 (45.3)	7.7 (45.9)	9.4 (48.9)	11.1 (52.0)	13.6 (56.5)	15.2 (59.4)	11.9 (53.4)
Record low °C (°F)	7.9 (46.2)	7.8 (46.0)	4.6 (40.3)	3.1 (37.6)	−0.3 (31.5)	−2.6 (27.3)	−1.1 (30.0)	−0.3 (31.5)	1.1 (34.0)	3.1 (37.6)	4.2 (39.6)	5.9 (42.6)	−2.6 (27.3)
Average rainfall mm (inches)	21.2 (0.83)	20.0 (0.79)	24.9 (0.98)	37.6 (1.48)	59.3 (2.33)	77.7 (3.06)	71.1 (2.80)	66.9 (2.63)	59.6 (2.35)	40.0 (1.57)	31.0 (1.22)	28.3 (1.11)	536.5 (21.12)
Average rainy days (≥ 0.2 mm)	4.7	3.7	5.9	8.2	12.7	14.6	16.3	16.2	13.5	9.9	8.3	7.2	121.2
Average afternoon relative humidity (%)	36	36	41	47	55	61	60	55	51	45	40	39	47
Mean monthly sunshine hours	325.5	285.3	266.6	219.0	167.4	135.0	145.7	189.1	204.0	257.3	273.0	294.5	2,762.4
Percentage possible sunshine	74	75	71	65	53	45	48	54	55	64	65	67	61
Source 1: Adelaide Airport M.O. (averages 1991–2020, extremes 1955–2025)
Source 2: Adelaide (Kent Town, rainfall 1991–2020, extremes 1977–2025)

The below table is of the Kent Town site, which is heavily affected by an Urban Heat Island that significantly raises minimum and maximum temperatures relative to both the Airport and West Terrace sites.

Climate data for Adelaide (Kent Town) 1991–2020 averages, 1977–2020 extremes
Month	Jan	Feb	Mar	Apr	May	Jun	Jul	Aug	Sep	Oct	Nov	Dec	Year
Record high °C (°F)	47.7 (117.9)	44.7 (112.5)	42.2 (108.0)	36.9 (98.4)	31.1 (88.0)	25.4 (77.7)	23.1 (73.6)	30.4 (86.7)	34.3 (93.7)	39.0 (102.2)	43.0 (109.4)	45.2 (113.4)	47.7 (117.9)
Mean maximum °C (°F)	42.0 (107.6)	39.8 (103.6)	36.7 (98.1)	31.6 (88.9)	25.6 (78.1)	20.8 (69.4)	20.4 (68.7)	23.5 (74.3)	28.3 (82.9)	33.4 (92.1)	37.0 (98.6)	39.3 (102.7)	42.8 (109.0)
Mean daily maximum °C (°F)	30.0 (86.0)	29.7 (85.5)	26.6 (79.9)	23.0 (73.4)	19.0 (66.2)	16.2 (61.2)	15.6 (60.1)	16.7 (62.1)	19.3 (66.7)	22.5 (72.5)	25.4 (77.7)	27.6 (81.7)	22.6 (72.7)
Daily mean °C (°F)	23.8 (74.8)	23.6 (74.5)	21.0 (69.8)	17.9 (64.2)	14.6 (58.3)	12.3 (54.1)	11.7 (53.1)	12.4 (54.3)	14.6 (58.3)	17.1 (62.8)	19.8 (67.6)	21.7 (71.1)	17.5 (63.5)
Mean daily minimum °C (°F)	17.6 (63.7)	17.5 (63.5)	15.3 (59.5)	12.7 (54.9)	10.2 (50.4)	8.3 (46.9)	7.7 (45.9)	8.1 (46.6)	9.9 (49.8)	11.7 (53.1)	14.1 (57.4)	15.8 (60.4)	12.4 (54.3)
Mean minimum °C (°F)	12.2 (54.0)	11.9 (53.4)	9.8 (49.6)	7.7 (45.9)	5.0 (41.0)	3.1 (37.6)	2.8 (37.0)	3.1 (37.6)	4.9 (40.8)	6.1 (43.0)	7.8 (46.0)	10.0 (50.0)	2.1 (35.8)
Record low °C (°F)	9.2 (48.6)	9.5 (49.1)	7.2 (45.0)	4.3 (39.7)	1.5 (34.7)	−0.4 (31.3)	0.4 (32.7)	0.9 (33.6)	2.6 (36.7)	4.7 (40.5)	5.3 (41.5)	7.9 (46.2)	−0.4 (31.3)
Average rainfall mm (inches)	21.2 (0.83)	20.0 (0.79)	24.9 (0.98)	37.6 (1.48)	59.3 (2.33)	77.7 (3.06)	71.1 (2.80)	66.9 (2.63)	59.6 (2.35)	40.0 (1.57)	31.0 (1.22)	28.3 (1.11)	536.5 (21.12)
Average rainy days (≥ 0.2 mm)	4.7	3.7	5.9	8.2	12.7	14.6	16.3	16.2	13.5	9.9	8.3	7.2	121.2
Average afternoon relative humidity (%)	36	36	40	45	55	61	59	54	50	44	40	38	47
Average dew point °C (°F)	9.4 (48.9)	9.9 (49.8)	9.2 (48.6)	8.2 (46.8)	8.1 (46.6)	7.3 (45.1)	6.2 (43.2)	5.5 (41.9)	6.2 (43.2)	6.1 (43.0)	7.3 (45.1)	8.1 (46.6)	7.6 (45.7)
Mean monthly sunshine hours	325.5	285.3	266.6	219.0	167.4	135.0	145.7	189.1	204.0	257.3	273.0	294.5	2,762.4
Percentage possible sunshine	74	75	71	65	53	45	48	54	55	64	65	67	61
Source: Bureau of Meteorology.

The below table demonstrates the effect of moderate elevation increase on Adelaide's climate.

Climate data for Belair, south eastern foothills of Adelaide (305 metres or 1,001 feet ASL) 1900–1938, 1962–1995
Month	Jan	Feb	Mar	Apr	May	Jun	Jul	Aug	Sep	Oct	Nov	Dec	Year
Record high °C (°F)	43.1 (109.6)	40.9 (105.6)	39.4 (102.9)	34.2 (93.6)	27.5 (81.5)	21.5 (70.7)	23.2 (73.8)	25.2 (77.4)	31.0 (87.8)	33.3 (91.9)	41.3 (106.3)	39.0 (102.2)	43.1 (109.6)
Mean daily maximum °C (°F)	26.7 (80.1)	27.0 (80.6)	24.2 (75.6)	20.3 (68.5)	16.5 (61.7)	13.4 (56.1)	12.5 (54.5)	13.8 (56.8)	16.1 (61.0)	19.5 (67.1)	22.6 (72.7)	24.8 (76.6)	19.8 (67.6)
Daily mean °C (°F)	20.7 (69.3)	21.2 (70.2)	19.2 (66.6)	16.2 (61.2)	13.3 (55.9)	10.6 (51.1)	9.8 (49.6)	10.6 (51.1)	12.3 (54.1)	14.8 (58.6)	17.2 (63.0)	19.0 (66.2)	15.4 (59.7)
Mean daily minimum °C (°F)	14.7 (58.5)	15.3 (59.5)	14.1 (57.4)	12.0 (53.6)	10.1 (50.2)	7.8 (46.0)	7.0 (44.6)	7.4 (45.3)	8.4 (47.1)	10.0 (50.0)	11.8 (53.2)	13.2 (55.8)	11.0 (51.8)
Record low °C (°F)	6.7 (44.1)	8.4 (47.1)	7.6 (45.7)	4.2 (39.6)	3.3 (37.9)	2.6 (36.7)	0.5 (32.9)	2.8 (37.0)	3.0 (37.4)	2.9 (37.2)	4.6 (40.3)	6.0 (42.8)	0.5 (32.9)
Average rainfall mm (inches)	24.4 (0.96)	24.6 (0.97)	30.8 (1.21)	58.2 (2.29)	93.2 (3.67)	100.9 (3.97)	97.5 (3.84)	86.8 (3.42)	73.5 (2.89)	58.7 (2.31)	40.1 (1.58)	34.0 (1.34)	724.0 (28.50)
Average rainy days	4.0	3.8	4.7	9.0	13.0	14.0	16.4	15.3	12.7	10.5	7.3	5.6	116.3
Average afternoon relative humidity (%)	46	46	47	60	69	76	77	71	63	58	54	51	60
Source: Bureau of Meteorology

Recorded extremes (records from West Tce weather station 1839–1977 and 2017–2025, Kent Town weather station 1977–2025 and Airport M.O. weather station 1955–2025):

- Hottest temperature: 47.7 °C (117.9 °F), 24 January 2019 (Note: 117.7 °F (47.6 °C) was recorded on 12 January 1939, but after homogenisation that day is officially recorded as 115.0 °F (46.1 °C).)
- Coldest temperature: −2.6 °C (27.3 °F), 8 June 1982
- Hottest Minimum: 34.1 °C (93.4 °F), 27 January 2026
- Coldest Maximum: 8.3 °C (46.9 °F), 29 June 1922
- Wettest month: 217.9 mm (8.58 in), June 1916
- Wettest 24 hours: 141.5 mm (5.57 in), 7 February 1925

Ultraviolet index
Jan	Feb	Mar	Apr	May	Jun	Jul	Aug	Sep	Oct	Nov	Dec	Year
12	10	8	5	3	2	2	3	5	7	10	11	6.5

== Extreme weather events: extreme temperatures, heatwaves, droughts (1908–2026) ==
=== January 1908 Heatwave ===
A severe 7-day heatwave recorded at the official West Terrace weather station, began on January 13th with a maximum of 101.1 °F (38.4 °C). On January 14th, the temperature surged to 105.3 °F (40.7 °C) and remained above 40°C for a total of six consecutive days. The month included 17 days exceeding 91 °F (33 °C) and 10 days above 104 °F (40 °C), with January 1908 setting the record for the most days over that last temperature in any January in Adelaide's history.

The highest temperature recorded that month was 110.1 °F (43.4 °C), which occurred on both January 17th and January 19th.

=== February 2007: Average maximums not seen since 1906 ===
The average daily maximum temperature in Adelaide for February 2007 was 32.9 °C or 91.2 °F, making it the second hottest on record only behind February 1906. The month included fifteen days above 33 °C or 91.4 °F and eight above 37 °C or 98.6 °F. The warmest day was the 17th with a temperature of 41.5 °C or 106.7 °F.

=== August 2007: Highest winter temperature ever ===
On 30 August 2007, the temperature in the city hit 30.4 °C or 86.7 °F the first and only 30 °C (86 °F) plus temperature recorded ever in winter, quite unusual for that time of year.

=== March 2008 heatwave ===
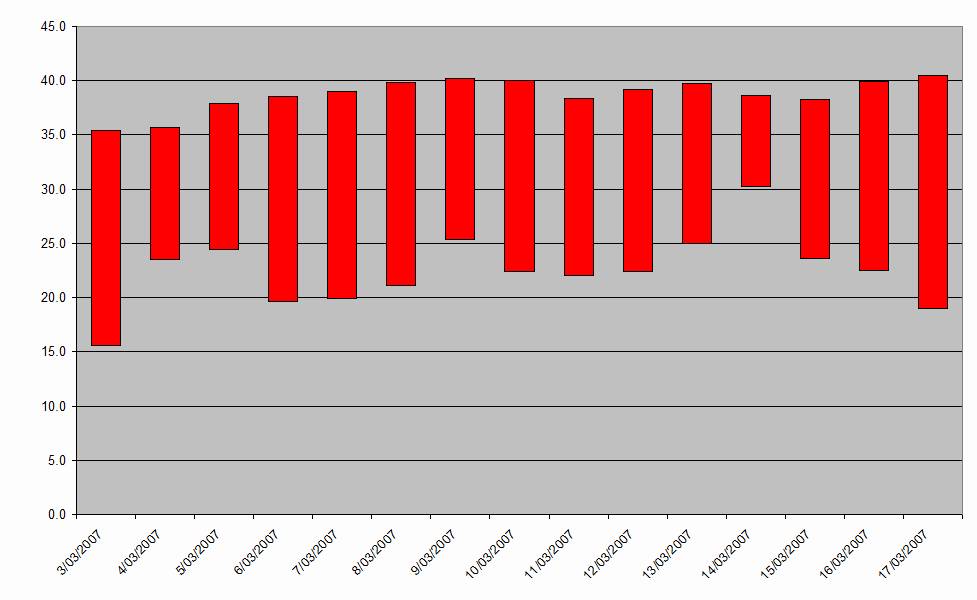
Graph showing daily maximum and minimum temperatures in Adelaide during record heat wave in 2008.

Between 3 March and 17 March 2008 Adelaide recorded 15 consecutive days of 35 °C (95 °F) or above, and 13 consecutive days of 37.8 °C (100.0 °F) or above – both records for an Australian capital city. (Note: The record number of consecutive days of 37.8 °C (100.0 °F) or above in any Australian city is held by Marble Bar in Western Australia, which experienced 160 consecutive days in 1923–24.)

The hottest March day ever recorded was 108 °F (42.2 °C) on 12 March 1861.

This heatwave is even more exceptional because it didn't occur in summer.

=== January–February 2009 heatwave ===
During January and February 2009 Adelaide was affected by the early 2009 southeastern Australia heat wave. The heatwave broke numerous records and affected all of south-eastern Australia, including Melbourne, where some outdoor games were cancelled during the 2009 Australian Open.

The heatwave commenced in Adelaide on 26 January 2009 (Australia Day), with a temperature of 36.6 °C (98 °F). From 27 January the temperature soared above 40 °C (104 °F) degrees for 6 consecutive days, until 2 February where the temperature dropped to 38.8 °C (102 °F). This is the longest straight run of 40 °C (104 °F) temperatures in Adelaide. On 28 January, the third day into the heatwave, the temperature reached 45.7 °C (114 °F), making it the third-hottest day on record in Adelaide. On that same night, the temperature only dipped to 33.9 °C (93 °F), making it the highest minimum temperature on record in South Australia (since surpassed). The maximum temperatures stayed higher than 30 °C (86 °F) for another six days, including two more 40-degree-plus days (6 and 7 February) until dropping back to 24.8 °C (77 °F) on 8 February 2009.

=== November 2009 heatwave ===
In November 2009 Adelaide was affected by the late 2009 southeastern Australia heatwave which occurred in the states of South Australia, Victoria and New South Wales. Daily maximum temperatures during the heat wave were roughly 10 °C (18 °F) above average in many locations. Capital cities Adelaide and Melbourne recorded temperatures over 40 °C (104 °F) and 35 °C (95 °F), respectively, which are unusual for November. Above-average temperatures in the region began in late October and persisted until mid-November 2009.

Temperature records for November in Adelaide set during the heatwave:

- 10 consecutive days over 30 °C (86 °F).
- 8 consecutive days over 35 °C (95 °F) – new record set on 13 November, breaking the previous record of 4 consecutive days, which was set in 1894.
- 6 consecutive days over 38 °C (100 °F) – breaking the previous record of 3 consecutive days, which was set in 1888, 1922 and 1984.
- Hottest November day – 43.0 °C (109.4 °F) on 19 November 2009 at 4:32pm ACDT, breaking the previous record of 42.0 °C (107.6 °F) set on 13 November 1993.

=== Summer 2013–2014 heatwave ===
The summer of 2013–2014 was the second-hottest on record. Records for Adelaide set during the 2013–2014 summer heatwave (beginning in December) include:

- Hottest February day – 44.7 °C (112.5 °F) on 2 February 2014.
- Record number of days exceeding 40 °C (104 °F) during the summer months (December, January and February) – 13.
- Record number of days exceeding 42 °C (108 °F) during a calendar year – 10.
- Record number of consecutive days exceeding 42 °C (108 °F) – 5.

=== Autumn 2014: Above average temperatures for Adelaide ===
Autumn 2014 was the fourth-hottest on record in South Australia, and included a record run of 16 consecutive days in May with maximum temperatures over 20 °C (68 °F) within the city and metro areas.

In the 15 days from the 11th to 25 May the average maximum temperature was 24 °C or 75.2 °F, compared with the usual 18.5 °C or 65.3 °F for that time of year.

=== Spring 2015: hottest October on record and 2nd warmest spring on record ===
October 2015 in Adelaide was the hottest on record for the city, continuing the trend of record breaking heat in the 2010s. The temperature was approximately 5 °C (9.0 °F) degrees above the long term average. Rainfall was also scarce for the month with only 9 millimetres or 0.35 inches being recorded.

November was also hotter than usual with daytime temperatures averaging 27.5 °C or 81.5 °F and temperatures reaching 40 °C or 104 °F on the 18th, the second earliest ever. Spring 2015 daytime maximum temperatures ended up averaging 24.6 °C or 76.3 °F, the second highest on record just falling short of 1914.

=== December 2015: Hottest December on record and second heatwave for the summer ===
In early December, Adelaide experienced its hottest December night since 1897 and another heatwave–the temperature did not drop below 33 °C (91 °F) until 4am on 7 December.

Following one of Adelaide's hottest nights on record, in mid December 2015, temperatures soared above 40 °C or 104 °F for 4 consecutive days between the 16th and 19th, with the warmest being the 19th at 43.2 °C or 109.8 °F. December 2015 ended up being the warmest on record with daily maximum temperatures averaging 32.5 °C (90.5 °F) and seven days above 40 °C or 104 °F. This continues the trend that Adelaide has experienced since the early 2000s of summer heat exceeding maximum temperatures and breaking records. The heatwave in December 2015 marked Adelaide's record of five heatwaves in six years.

=== March 2016 heatwave ===
In early March, Adelaide endured 9 consecutive days in which the temperature reached above 30 °C (86 °F). On 5, 6 and 8 March, the temperature approached maximums of 37 °C (99 °F) and 38 °C (100 °F) degrees. Rain during this period increased the humidity level in the city, and flash flooding was recorded in the suburbs, as temperatures dropped back into the high 20s on 9 March.

15 of the first 17 days of March 2016 recorded temperatures above 30 °C or 86 °F, the second half of the month was much cooler though.

=== Hottest Christmas Day in 75 years and February 2017 heatwave ===
On 25 December 2016, Adelaide experienced its hottest Christmas Day since 1941. The temperature reached 41.3 °C (106.3 °F). That following February, temperatures recorded in Adelaide climbed above 40 °C (104 °F) for 3 consecutive days, with the minimum overnight temperature not dropping below 30 °C (86 °F) on 9 February. Blackouts across the city complicated the conditions further.

=== Winter 2017: Equal lowest June rainfall in Adelaide's recorded history ===
Adelaide recorded its second driest June in recorded history, and the driest in 59 years. Less than 10 millimetres or 0.4 inches fell in the entire month compared to the average of 71.2 millimetres or 2.80 inches, with Adelaide city recording only 6 millimetres or 0.24 inches, the equal lowest monthly rainfall total for any winter month in recorded history. Agricultural regions across South Australia were also affected, experiencing the third driest winter on record.

=== Summer 2017–2018: fourteen consecutive days above 30 degrees and various heatwaves ===
Summer 2017–18 was another hot summer for Adelaide. Beginning on 15 January 2018, the daytime temperature in Adelaide did not drop below 30 °C (86 °F) with forecasts of temperatures above 37 °C (99 °F) up until 29 January. Two of these days, 18 January and 19 January, reached temperatures of above 40 °C (104 °F), while three days recorded temperatures at 37 °C (99 °F) or above resulting in a heatwave. The last day of this heatwave, the 28th, reached 41.8 °C or 107.2 °F at the Adelaide (West Terrace) observation station and 44.1 °C or 111.4 °F at the Adelaide (Kent Town) station, located on the eastern side of the city.

- Total number of days with temperatures of 37 °C (99 °F) or above in Adelaide for summer 2017–18: 15.
- Total number of days with temperatures of 40 °C (104 °F) or above: 5.

=== Exceptional Autumn Heat – April 2018 ===
Continuing the above average heat of 2018, April 2018 was the second hottest of all time, with the average maximum temperature for the whole month being 26.6 °C or 79.9 °F, well above the usual 22.8 °C or 73 °F. The unusual warmth also produced some of the highest April temperatures of all time, including a record equaling 36.9 °C (98.4 °F) on the 11th. The 9th and 10th were also exceptionally hot, registering 36.6 °C (97.9 °F) and 36.5 °C (97.7 °F) respectively.

=== New record hottest day – January 2019 ===
On 24 January 2019 the official Adelaide weather observation station (West Terrace) reached a new record high temperature of 46.6 °C (115.9 °F), breaking the previous 1939 record of 115.0 °F (46.1 °C). As of January 2026, this remains Adelaide's hottest recorded temperature.

January 2019 was also one of the warmest months on record with an average daily maximum temperature of 33.0 °C (91.4 °F).

=== January–April 2019: Driest start to a year in a decade ===
The first four months of 2019 were exceptionally dry, with only 17.8 millimetres or 0.70 inches falling in the four months combined. January was completely dry, while February had 6.6 millimetres or 0.26 inches, March had 8 millimetres or 0.31 inches and April had 3.2 millimetres or 0.13 inches which is one of the driest of all time. Only 7 of the first 120 days of the year recorded over 1 millimetre or 0.04 inches of rain with the highest daily total for the four months being 2.8 millimetres or 0.11 inches on 13 February.

=== December 2019 Heatwave ===
Between 17 and 20 December 2019, the official Adelaide weather observation station (West Terrace) recorded four consecutive days above 42 °C or 107.6 °F. This heatwave also produced the hottest December day and night on record, on the 19th the temperature hit 45.3 °C or 113.5 °F at the West Terrace station, the following night the temperature didn't drop below 33.6 °C or 92.5 °F making it the second-hottest night on record. On the eastern side of town, the Adelaide (Kent Town) weather station recorded 3 consecutive days of 45 °C (113 °F) or more.

In the second half of December 2019 (16th-31st) the average daily maximum was 36.4 °C (97.5 °F). This led to the whole month being the third hottest December on record for Adelaide.

=== August 2020 – Coldest August night on record ===
On the morning of 5 August 2020 the temperature at the Adelaide (West Terrace) station dropped to 0.8 °C (33.4 °F). This reading is the lowest ever in August and the equal third-lowest temperature in history at the West Terrace station.

=== November 2020 – Second hottest on record ===
November 2020 was actually the hottest November on record for the Adelaide (West Terrace) observation station, with an average daily maximum of 28.8 °C (83.8 °F). The month had 15 days above 30 °C (86 °F) and 11 above 33 °C (91.4 °F). It also was the hottest month of 2020 for average daily maximums, beating January by 0.1 °C (0.18 °F).

The only other hotter November was in 2009 when the official weather observation station was Adelaide (Kent Town) not West Terrace.

=== January 2026: One of the hottest nights on record ===
On the night of 26 January 2026, Adelaide recorded one of its highest minimums on record, with the temperature at the Adelaide (West Terrace) station dropping to 34.1 °C (93.4 °F).

== See also ==
- Climate of Australia
- Climate change in Australia
- Extreme weather events
- Bushfires in Australia
- Effects of the El Niño–Southern Oscillation in Australia
