= Team Russia =

Russian yacht racing team

- Team Russia Logo
- Yacht name: Kosatka
- Skipper: (Austria) Andreas Hanakamp
- Founder: (Russia) Oleg Zherebtsov
- Sponsors: WDCS
- Suppliers: Polyvanced, FSE Robline, Steiner
- Flag: Russian
- Sail #: RUS1
- Website: www.teamrussia.org

Team Russia was the name of the Russian backed entry in the 2008–09 Volvo Ocean Race. Team Russia was founded by Oleg Zherebtsov, the founder of the Lenta hypermarket chain in Russia. Zherebstov met former Olympic sailor and professional skipper, Andreas Hanakamp, by chance during a sailing holiday in Croatia. The CEO of Team Russia is Michael Woods, who was director of Race Operations for the 2001-02 race.

Their yacht, a second generation Volvo Open 70, was designed by British designer Rob Humphreys and built by Green Marine in Lymington, UK she was christened Kosatka (which is Russian for orca or killer whale) at a ceremony at Gunwharf Quays Marina, Portsmouth, UK on Monday June 16, 2008, by the boats godmother Birgitta Westerberg, co-founder (with Oleg Zherebtsov), of the Solntse (Sun) Foundation charity for sick and underprivileged children in St Petersburg, Russia.

Team Russia had to suspend racing upon arrival in Singapore at the end of Leg 3 due to "insufficient funds". They officially withdrew from legs 4, 5, and 6 of the race, and whilst the team hoped to rejoin for the last legs of the race, this was not possible, however the team did sail Leg 10 beside the rest of the fleet to their hometown of St Petersburg.

== Race team ==
'We Sail For The Whale’ Logo

The race team consisted of some previous Volvo Ocean Race sailors, as well as some newcomers to the event.

Name	Position	Previous VOR Experience
(United Kingdom) Mark Covell	Media Crew Member	
(South Africa) Michael Joubert	Bowman	1997-98 'BrunelSunergy', 2001-02 Assa Abloy, 2005-06 'movistar'
(Austria) Andreas Hanakamp	Skipper	(Newcomer)
(Netherlands) Wouter Verbraak	Navigator	2001-02 Djuice Dragons
(Ukraine) Rodion Luka	Helmsman	(Newcomer)
(Russia) Oleg Zherebtsov	Bowman 2 and Pit	(Newcomer)
(Republic of Ireland) Jeremy Elliott	Trimmer and Sail Designer	(Newcomer)
(Spain) Guillermo Altadil	Watch leader	2001-02 Assa Abloy, 2005-06 'Ericsson'
(England) Nick Bubb	Pitman	(Newcomer)
(Denmark) Stig Westergaard	Watch Captain	2001-02 'Djuice Dragons'
(New Zealand) Ben Costello	Trim / Helm	
(South Africa) Camron Wills	Grinder and trimmer	

== WDCS Partnership ==
The WDCS were announced as the official partner for Team Russia. Kosatka sailed under the logo 'We Sail For The Whale’ which calls for the creation of twelve new marine protected areas for whales and dolphins by 2012.

For more information see: WDCS#2008–09 Volvo Ocean Race
