= Oleg Zherebtsov =

Oleg Zherebtsov (born 21 May 1968) is a Russian businessman, founder of hypermarkets "Lenta" and "Norma", the European sailing champion in 2012 at 12 meters class, the founder of the Association SB20 in Russia, and General Director of the Pharmaceutical Company Solopharm.

Oleg was born in Bryansk, Russia.

== Business Ventures ==
Zherebtsov Oleg founded "Lenta" on 25 October 1993 in St. Petersburg. In 2007, 10 hypermarkets were opened (three of them in St. Petersburg), in 2008 — 8. By this time in Russia there were already 32 existing hypermarkets. In May 2007 the European Bank for reconstruction and development bought a share in "Lenta" for $125 million, estimated to be 11–14% of the share capital. At the end of December 2008, the company "Lenta" was included in the list of companies that would receive state support during the economic crisis. In October 2009, Oleg Zherebtsov sold his part in "Lenta" to the consilium investment funds TPQ and VTB Capital.

Oleg Zherebtsov founded the company "Norma" in 2005. In 2007, it opened its first store in St. Petersburg. In 2011 Oleg Zherebtsov sold his assets in the company "Norm".

In 2010 Oleg Zherebtsov created the company "Solopharm" for the production of pharmaceutical products.

== Sailing career ==
Oleg Zherebtsov started sailing in 2007. In 2008 Zherebtsov participated in the Volvo Ocean Race, a race around the world, founding Team Russia and serving as the pitman and second bowman. Related to the Volvo Ocean Race, the Far East Russia Orca Project (co-founded by a member of the Whale and Dolphin Conservation Society which was the sponsor of Team Russia) named an Orca after Zherebtsov.

In 2009 and 2010, he received first place in the championship of Russia in the national class Em-ka. In 2011, Zherebtsov took second place overall in the Laser SB3 Pre World Regatta with his teammates Maria Rudskaia, Eugeni Didyk, and Rodion Luka at the helm of the Team Russia boat. Luka and Zherebtsov went on to take first place in the 2012 SB20 European Championships held in September with teammates with Anna Stepanova and Andre Klochko, followed by 3rd place in the SB20 worlds 2012 held in December.
