= Damian Foxall =

Irish sailor from County Kerry

Damian Foxall (born 7 March 1969) is an Irish sailor from County Kerry.

== Personal details ==
Foxall is married to Lucy Hunt, he has two children named Oisín and Neave, whom he had with his wife Suzy-Ann, a Quebec city native. He currently resides in Quebec, Canada.

== Key sailing results ==
In addition to his offshore experience, Foxall has also been associated with dinghy, Olympic and America's Cup sailing.

Pos	Year	Race	Class	Boat name	Notes	Ref
Round the World Races
?	2023	2019-2023 The Ocean Race	IMOCA 60	11th Hour Racing Team	Sustainability program manager & Sailor	
5	2018	2017–2018 Volvo Ocean Race	Volvo Ocean 65	Team Vestas 11th Hour Racing	Sailor & Sustainability program manager	
6	2014	2014–2015 Volvo Ocean Race	Volvo Ocean 65	Donfeng race team		
1	2011	2011–2012 Volvo Ocean Race	Volvo Ocean 70	Groupama sailing team		
5	2009	2008-2009 Volvo Ocean Race	Volvo Ocean 70	Green Dragon Racing Team		
1	2008	Barcelona World Race	IMOCA 60	Paprec Virbac 2	with Jean-Pierre Dick (FRA)	
5	2006	2005-2006 Volvo Ocean Race	Volvo Ocean 70	Ericsson Racing Team		
1	2005	Oryx Quest	-	Maxi Cat - Doha	as a crew member	
WR	2004	Eastabout Non-Stop Round The World record	-	Maxi Cat - Cheyenne	skippered by Steve Fossett (USA)	
4	2002	2001-2002 Volvo Ocean Race	Whitbread 60	Team Tyco		
Trans-oceanic Races
2	2013	Transat Jacques Vabre	Multi	Mod 70 - Oman Air-Musandam	Doublehanded with Sidney Gavignet (FRA)	
ABN	2005	Transat Jacques Vabre	ORMA 60	Foncia	Doublehanded with Sidney Gavignet (FRA)	
3	2003	Transat Jacques Vabre	ORMA 60	Sergio Tacchini	Doublehanded with Karine Fauconnier (FRA)	
8	2000	Transat AG2r	Beneteau Figaro	JACQUES VABRE	Doublehanded with F. PROFFIT	
5	1998	Transat AG2r	Beneteau Figaro	SKIPPER ELF	Doublehanded with Sidney GAVIGNET (FRA)	
Other Race
Various	2017	Trimaran circuit	MOD 70	Pheado		
WR	2016	Outright Round Ireland	Multi	MOD 70 - Phaedo	36 hours and 52 minutes	
1	2016	Round Ireland Race	Multi	MOD 70 - OMANSAIL		
1	2014	Sevenstar Round Britain and Ireland	Multi	MOD 70 - Oman Sail	(new record) as a crew member	
1	2006	Archipelago Raid			with Magnus Woxen	
	2004	America Cup Challenger Series; Louis Vuitton Acts	IACC	K-Challenge		
1	2004	Transat Québec St-Malo	ORMA tri	Sergio Tacchini		
60	2003	ISAF Sailing World Championships	Tornado		Cadiz, ESP	
12	2002	Formula 18 World Championship	Formula 18		Travemunde, GER	
	1997	Solitaire du Figaro	Beneteau Figaro			

== Sailing career ==
Foxall has competed in and worked with eleven round-the-world race teams, which include four 1st-place finishes.

=== Solo Offshore Sailing ===
In 1997 Foxall became the first non-French entry to win the rookie class in the Single-handed offshore race - La Solitaire du Figaro. He went on to confirm his success in 1998–1999 with a leg win, before changing to the ORMA 60` Trimaran class.

=== Two Person Stopping Round the World Race ===
In the 2007/2008 Barcelona World Race, sailing with co-skipper Jean-Pierre Dick on the Open 60 Paprec-Virbac. He was subsequently described as a national hero and Ireland's top international sailor and was greeted at a reception at the Presidential Residence in Ireland

=== Crewed Stopping Round the World Race ===
In 2011 Foxall won the Volvo Ocean race with Team Groupama.

Other rtw events include 5 Volvo ocean races, and a World Record circumnavigation in early 2004 with Steve Fossett on the G-Class catamaran Cheyenne. He was named Sailor of the Month by Afloat Magazine in March 2004.

Damian is a sailor and sustainability manager with Team Vestas 11th Hour racing. Competing in the Volvo Ocean Race, whilst promoting Ocean health and sustainability as part of the Team Vestas 11th Hour racing core goals.

=== Multihulls ===
His results in the ORMA 60' Trimaran class include: 1st - Transat Quebec-St Malo. 2nd - ORMA circuit championship. 3 participations in Double Handed Transat Jacques Vabre, including 2nd, 3rd and a capsize. 2 Grand prix wins.

=== Sport ===
In 2019, Foxall made a 400-metre descent on skis from the summit of Ireland's highest mountain, Carrauntoohil (1,014 m), down the Shoulder of Corrán to the top of the steep gully known as the Devil's Ladder.

=== Expeditions ===
In 2019, Foxall ran Quixote expedition's vessel for three months in Antarctica. With his crew, Niall McAllister, Lucy Hunt, Caesar Chinchas, following the route of Edward Bransfield.

== Conservation Work ==
=== Canadian Wildlife Federation ===
From 2012 to 2017 Damian worked as Recreation Education Manager for the Canadian Wildlife Federation and is an advocate for outdoor education, connecting people with the natural world to promote health and conservation.

=== Outdoor Education ===
Damian Foxall is an active promoter of Ocean conservation. Ambassador for : Sailors for the sea; Race for water. He also works to promote Best practices at afloat with regards to marine mammals. See - When whales meet sails

== Bibliography ==
- Ocean Fever: The Damian Foxall Story (an Illustrated Paperback Book). The Collins Press; Illustrated edition. 1 October 2011. ISBN 978-1848890374.
