= Magnus Olsson =

Magnus Olsson may refer to:

- Magnus Olsson (bandy) (born 1972), Swedish bandy player
- Magnus Olsson (sailor)

== See also ==
- Magnus Olsen (1878–1963), Norwegian linguist
