= Bossley =

Bossley may refer to:

- Bossley Park, suburb of Sydney, Australia
- Mike Bossley, Australian environmentalist
- Pete Bossley, (born 1950), New Zealand architect
- Al-Shater Bossely Abdul Jalil (1901–1977), Egyptian historian and anthropologist

== See also ==
- Bosley, village and civil parish in Cheshire, England
