= CWF =

CWF may refer to:

- Canadian Wildlife Federation, a conservation organisation
- Championship Wrestling from Florida, a defunct Florida-based professional wrestling promotion
- Continental Wrestling Federation, a defunct Tennessee and Alabama-based professional wrestling promotion
- CWF, the IATA and FAA LID code for Chennault International Airport, Louisiana, United States
- CWF, the National Rail station code for Canary Wharf railway station, London, England
