= Ericsson 4 =

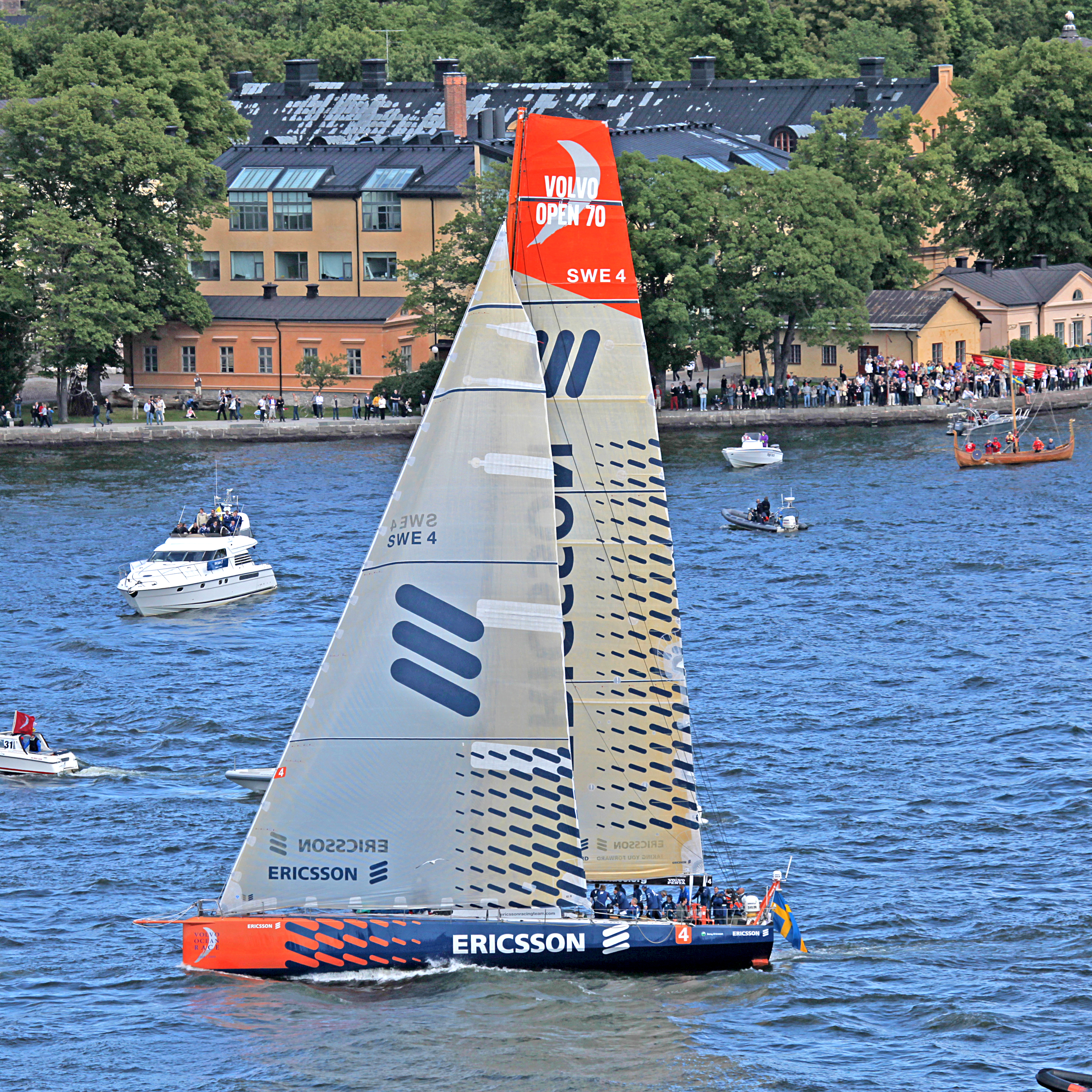
- Ericsson 4 in 2009.
- Other names: Groupama 70
- Nation: Sweden; France
- Class: Volvo Open 70
- Sail no: SWE–4
- Designer(s): Juan Kouyoumdjian
- Builder: Killian Busche & Ericsson; Stockholm, Sweden
- Launched: July 2008

Racing career
- Skippers: Torben Grael; Franck Cammas
- Notable victories: 2008–09 Volvo Ocean Race

Ericsson 4 (also Groupama 70 or L4 Trifork) is a Volvo Open 70 yacht. She won the 2008–09 Volvo Ocean Race skippered by Torben Grael and with Horacio Carabelli, Jules Salter, Guy Salter, Brad Jackson, Stu Bannatyne, Dave Endean, Joao Signorini, Ryan Godfre, Phil Jameson and Tony Mutter as part of the crew. They broke the world record for the greatest distance travelled in 24 hours in a monohull yacht.
