= Solopharm =

Russian pharmaceutical company

- Industry: Pharmaceuticals
- Founded: 2010

Solopharm (Grotex OOO) is a Russian pharmaceutical company that produces liquid sterile dosage forms according to GMP standards (license No. 00023-LS). The company manufactures infusion and injection solutions, ophthalmic, otolaryngological, gastroenterological, rheumatological and cosmetological products.

== History ==
Solopharm was established in 2010 by Russian businessman, Oleg Zherebtsov. In August 2014, the company launched injection and infusion solution technology Blow-Fill-Seal. Solopharm company continues building and assembling new lines to increase the amount of liquid medicines in ophthalmology, otolaryngology, gastroenterology, rheumatology and cosmetology.

== Activity ==
The company activity is directed to development and production of:

- Products in polyethylene and polypropylene packaging
- Generics in different therapeutic areas
- Own brands of drugs and medical products

== Product Lines ==
- Ophthalmology
- Rheumatology
- Otolaryngology
- Pulmonology
- Cosmetology
- Gastroenterology
- Injection solutions
- Infusion solutions
