= Andreas Hanakamp =

Austrian sailor

Personal information
- Nationality: Austrian
- Born: 1 June 1966 (age 60) Wiener Neustadt, Austria
- Height: 200 cm (6 ft 7 in)

Sailing career
- Sport: Sailing
- Club: Royal Southern Yacht Club
- Classes: Star, Volvo Ocean 60, Volvo Open 70

Andreas Hanakamp (born 1 July 1966) is an Austrian sailor who has competed in two Olympic Games as well many other sailing events including the 1996 Hong-Kong-Challenge, Bacardi Cup, Rolex Fastnet Race and most recently, is competing in the 2008-09 Volvo Ocean Race.

Hanakamp has sailed over 150,000 miles offshore, with 30,000 miles offshore racing experience. Andreas works as a professional sailor and also owns his own sailing services company based in Austria. He is married to Nicole, they have three children; Lisa, Nicola and Marie.

== Achievements ==
Year	Position	Boat type	Event	Skipper/Crew
1996	15th	International Star	(United States) 1996 Olympic Games – Star Class	Crew. (Skipper: Hubert Raudaschl)
1996	–	–	(Hong Kong) HongKong Challenge	Skipper
1998	6th	–	(Australia) 1998 Sydney to Hobart Yacht Race	
2004	13th	International Star	(Greece) 2004 Olympic Games – Star Class	Crew. (Skipper: Hans Spitzauer)
2007	6th	Volvo 60	2007 Rolex Fastnet Race	Skipper
2008-09	TBD	Volvo Open 70	2008–09 Volvo Ocean Race	Skipper

Hanakamp is an ambassador to the Year of the Dolphin project.

=== Volvo Ocean Race ===
Hanakamp was the press officer for the 2001–02 Volvo Ocean Race, and skipper for Team Russia in the 2008–09 Volvo Ocean Race.

=== Star class results ===
Year	Position	Boat type	Event	Skipper/Crew
1995	16th	International Star	1995 Star Class World Championships	Crew. (Skipper: Hubert Raudaschl)
2002	10th	International Star	(Italy) 2002 Star European Championships	Crew. (Skipper: Hans Spitzauer)
2003	1st	International Star	(Italy) Olympic Garda – Eurolymp: Lake Garda	Crew. (Skipper: Hans Spitzauer)
2003	10th	International Star	2003 European Spring Championships	Crew. (Skipper: Hans Spitzauer)
2003	20th	International Star	(Netherlands) SPA Regatta: Star Class	Crew. (Skipper: Hans Spitzauer)
2003	10th	International Star	(Germany) 2003 Kiel Regatta	Crew. (Skipper: Hans Spitzauer)
2003	18th	International Star	2003 Star Europeans	Crew. (Skipper: Hans Spitzauer)
2003	9th	International Star	(Spain) 2003 Cádiz World Championships	Crew. (Skipper: Hans Spitzauer)
2003	2nd	International Star	(United States) 2003 Commodores Cup	Crew. (Skipper: Hans Spitzauer)
2004	9th	International Star	(United States) 2004 Bacardi Cup	Crew. (Skipper: Hans Spitzauer)
2004	63rd	International Star	(United States) 2004 Biscayne Star Trophy	Crew. (Skipper: Hans Spitzauer)
2004	20th	International Star	(United States) Rolex Miami OCR: Star Class	Crew. (Skipper: Hans Spitzauer)
2004	21st	International Star	(Spain) 2004 Star Class European Championship	Crew. (Skipper: Hans Spitzauer)
2004	26th	International Star	2004 Star World Championship	Crew. (Skipper: Hans Spitzauer)
2004	14th	International Star	2004 Spa Regatta	Crew. (Skipper: Hans Spitzauer)
2004	31st	International Star	(Germany) 2004 Kiel Week	Crew. (Skipper: Hans Spitzauer)
2004	16th	International Star	(Greece) Star Class Greek National Championships	Crew. (Skipper: Hans Spitzauer)
2005	7th	International Star	(Austria) 2005 Falkensteintrophy	Crew. (Skipper: Clemens Holzapfel)
2005	3rd	International Star	(Austria) Attersee Fleet Championship	Skipper. (Crew: Clemens Holzapfel)
2005	16th	International Star	(Austria) Österr.Staatsmeisterschaft&Gams (Austrian Championship)	Skipper. (Crew: Clemens Holzapfel)
2005	7th	International Star	(Austria) 2005 Wodi Wodi-Pokal	Skipper. (Crew: Wolfgang Perdich)
