= Green Dragon Racing Team =

Green Dragon
- (Green Dragon Logo)

History
- Established: 2008
- Headquarters: (Republic of Ireland) Galway, Ireland,
- Sponsors: SDLG (Shandong Lingong Construction Machinery Co., Ltd); Weichai Power bwin Group; Triangle Group Co., Ltd; BERG PROPULSION; UNITED GAMES; Discover Ireland
- Website: GreenDragonSailing.com

Green Dragon Racing Team competed in the 2008-2009 Volvo Ocean Race. The team was captained by Ian Walker and finished the race in fifth place overall, scoring 63 points. The boat was designed by Reichel Pugh and built by McConaghy Boats.

== Race Team ==
Name	Position
Ian Walker	Skipper
Ian Moore	Navigator
Damian Foxall	Watch Leader
Neal McDonald	Watch Leader
Andrew McLean	Bowman
Justin Slattery	Bowman
Freddy Shanks	Bowman
Philip Harmer	Trimmer
Anthony Merrington	Pit / Trimmer / Helm
James Carroll	Pit (Leg 3)
Guo Chuan	Media Crew
