= 2008–2009 Volvo Ocean Race =

2008–09 Volvo Ocean Race

Event title
- Edition: 10th
- Dates: 4 October 2008 – 26 June 2009
- Yachts: Volvo Open 70

Competitors
- Competitors: 8

Results
- Winner: Ericsson 4

The 2008–09 Volvo Ocean Race was a yacht race held between 4 October 2008 and 27 June 2009, the tenth edition of the round the world Volvo Ocean Race.

The eight participating boats made ten stops in nine countries around the world. The first offshore leg of the 2008–09 Race started in Alicante, Spain, on 11 October 2008, with the in-port race having been held seven days earlier. A total of ten legs created the route, with seven in-port (IP) races held at various cities around the world. Unlike previous editions, the route crossed the Strait of Malacca at the Malay Archipelago, instead of Cape Leeuwin south of Australia. The boats covered 37,000 nautical miles (69,000 km) in the course of their journey. The chief executive of the 2008–09 race was Knut Frostad.

On 15 June 2009, Ericsson 4, skippered by Torben Grael, finished third on leg 9 from Marstrand to Stockholm, Sweden. With their third-place finish, they were able to secure overall victory. Ericsson 4 covered the 42,500 miles (68,400 km) of the race in a time of 127 days, 7 hours, 46 minutes, 21 seconds. Ericsson 4 completed the race with 114 ½ points, whilst Puma ended with 105 ½.

Principal race officer, Bill O'Hara, described the Kochi race as a "memorable" port but Galway was the best.

== Participants ==
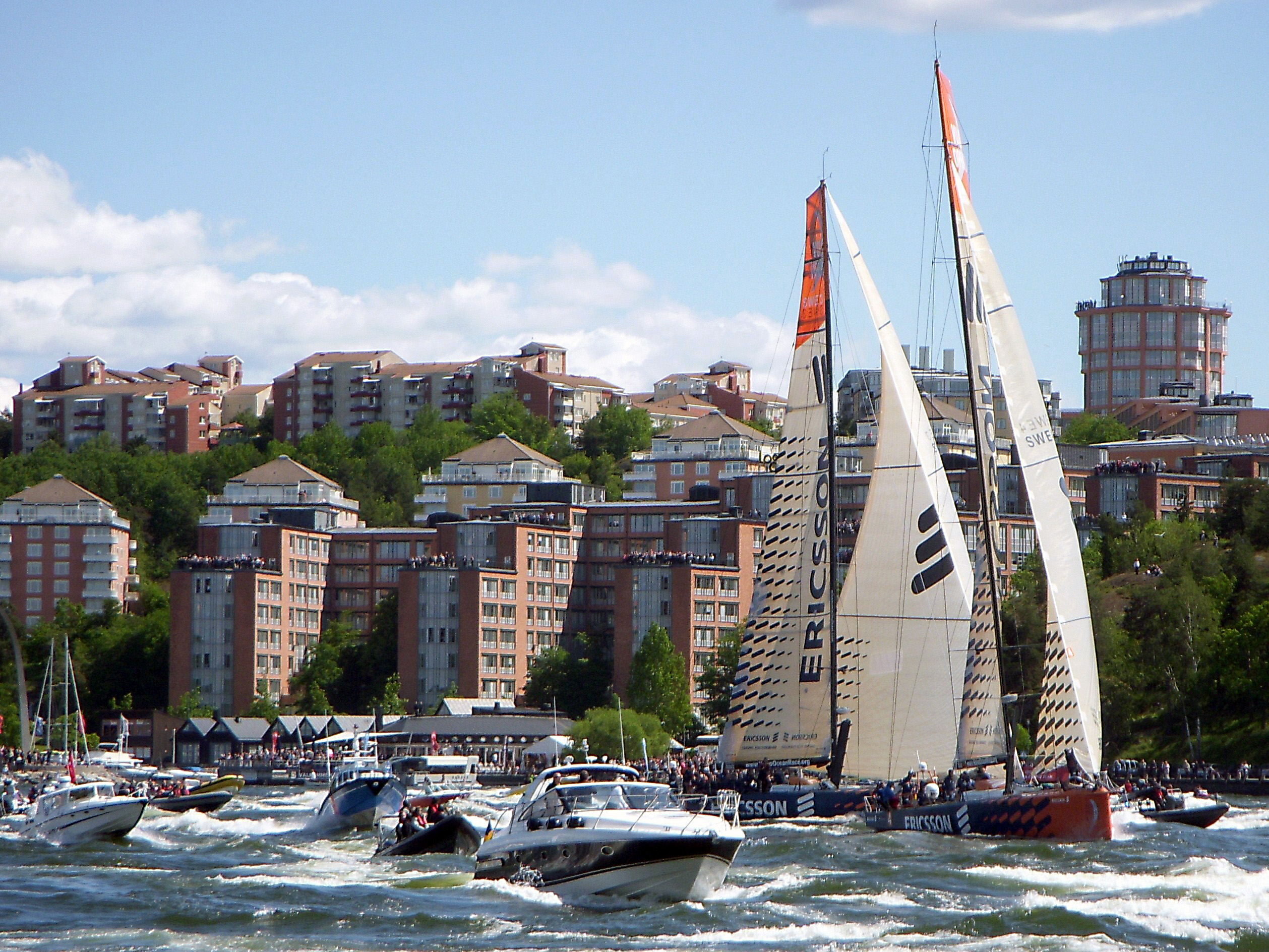
Ericsson 3 and Ericsson 4 in Stockholm

Team & Boat name	Sail no.	Flag	Design Firm	Builder	Skipper
Ericsson Racing Team; Ericsson 3 – Nordic crew	SWE 3	Sweden	Juan Kouyoumdjian	Killian Bushe	Magnus Olsson (Leg 4- ) Anders Lewander (Leg 1–3)
Ericsson Racing Team; Ericsson 4 – International crew	SWE 4	Sweden	Juan Kouyoumdjian	Killian Bushe	Torben Grael
Green Dragon Racing Team; Green Dragon	IRL 888	Ireland; China	Reichel/Pugh	McConaghy Boats	Ian Walker
Puma Ocean Racing Team; Il Mostro	USA 1948	United States	Botin Carkeek	Goetz Custom Boats & Customline Yachts	Ken Read
Team Delta Lloyd; Black Betty	NED 1	Netherlands	Juan Kouyoumdjian	Killian Bushe	Roberto Bermúdez(Leg 2- ) Ger O'Rourke (Leg 1)
Team Russia (Sponsor: WDCS); Kosatka	RUS 1	Russia	Humphreys Yacht Design	Green Marine	Andreas Hanakamp
Telefonica Blue; H.R.M. Elena	ESP 12	Spain	Farr Yacht Design	King Marine	Bouwe Bekking
Telefonica Black; H.R.M. Cristina	ESP 11	Spain	Farr Yacht Design	Southern Ocean Marine	Fernando Echávarri

=== Budgets ===
Ericsson's budgets were €50 million, whilst Puma's budget was approximately €20 million. By comparison, the joint Irish and Chinese team, Green Dragon, received €8 million from the Irish government and €4 million from China.

=== Team websites ===
- Ericsson Racing Team
- Equipo Telefonica
- Green Dragon Racing Team Archived 28 August 2008 at the Wayback Machine
- Puma Ocean Racing
- Team Delta Lloyd
- Team Russia Archived 12 September 2008 at the Wayback Machine

== Route ==
=== Summary ===
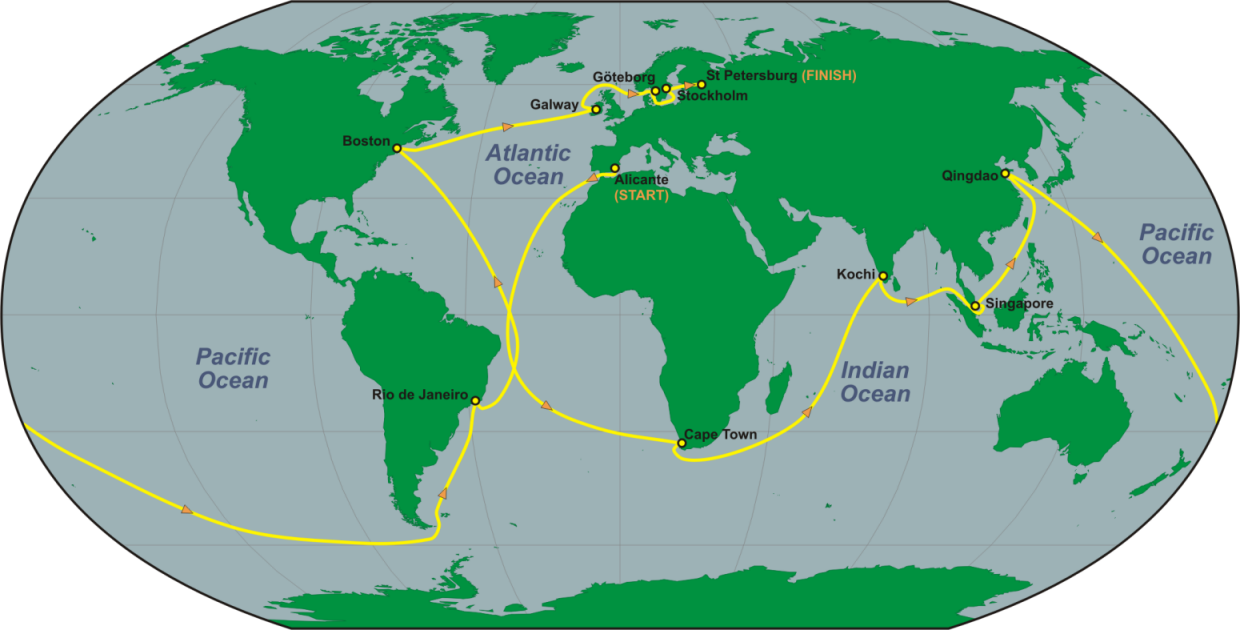
Volvo Ocean Race 2008–2009 Route Map.

Event	Starting date	Start	Finish	Distance (nmi)	Winner	Second	Third
IP Race 1	4 October 2008	(Spain) Alicante		-	Telefonica Blue	Telefonica Black	PUMA
Leg 1	11 October 2008	(Spain) Alicante	(South Africa) Cape Town	6,500	Ericsson 4	PUMA	Green Dragon.
Leg 2	15 November 2008	(South Africa) Cape Town	(India) Kochi	4,450	Ericsson 4	Telefonica Blue	Ericsson 3
Leg 3	13 December 2008	(India) Kochi	Singapore	1,950	Telefonica Blue	Puma	Ericsson 3
IP Race 2	10 January 2009	Singapore		-	Ericsson 4	PUMA	Telefonica Blue
Leg 4	18 January 2009	Singapore	(China) Qingdao	2,500	Telefonica Blue	PUMA	Ericsson 4
IP Race 3	7 February 2009	(China) Qingdao		-	Ericsson 4	Telefonica Blue	PUMA
Leg 5	14 February 2009	(China) Qingdao	(Brazil) Rio de Janeiro	12,300	Ericsson 3	Ericsson 4	PUMA
IP Race 4	4 April 2009	(Brazil) Rio de Janeiro		-	Telefonica Blue	PUMA	Delta Lloyd
Leg 6	11 April 2009	(Brazil) Rio de Janeiro	(United States) Boston	4,900	Ericsson 4	Ericsson 3	Telefonica Blue
IP Race 5	9 May 2009	(United States) Boston		-	Telefonica Blue	Ericsson 4	Delta Lloyd
Leg 7	16 May 2009	(United States) Boston	(Republic of Ireland) Galway	2,550	Ericsson 4	PUMA	Green Dragon
IP Race 6	30 May 2009	(Republic of Ireland) Galway		-	PUMA Ocean Racing	Telefonica Blue	Telefonica Black
Leg 8	6 June 2009	(Republic of Ireland) Galway	(Sweden) Marstrand	950	Ericsson 4	PUMA	Green Dragon
Leg 9	14 June 2009	(Sweden) Marstrand	(Sweden) Stockholm	525	PUMA Ocean Racing	Ericsson 3	Ericsson 4
IP Race 7	21 June 2009	(Sweden) Stockholm		-	Telefonica Blue	PUMA	Telefonica Black
Leg 10	25 June 2009	(Sweden) Stockholm	(Russia) Saint Petersburg	370	Telefonica Black	PUMA	Telefonica Blue

The route also included seven ‘scoring gates’ (at Fernando de Noronha, Mauritius, Pulau Weh, Indonesia, Latitude 36S, Cape Horn, Fernando de Noronha and St John's, Newfoundland). Yachts scored 'half-points' at these gates, the same as for the in port races.

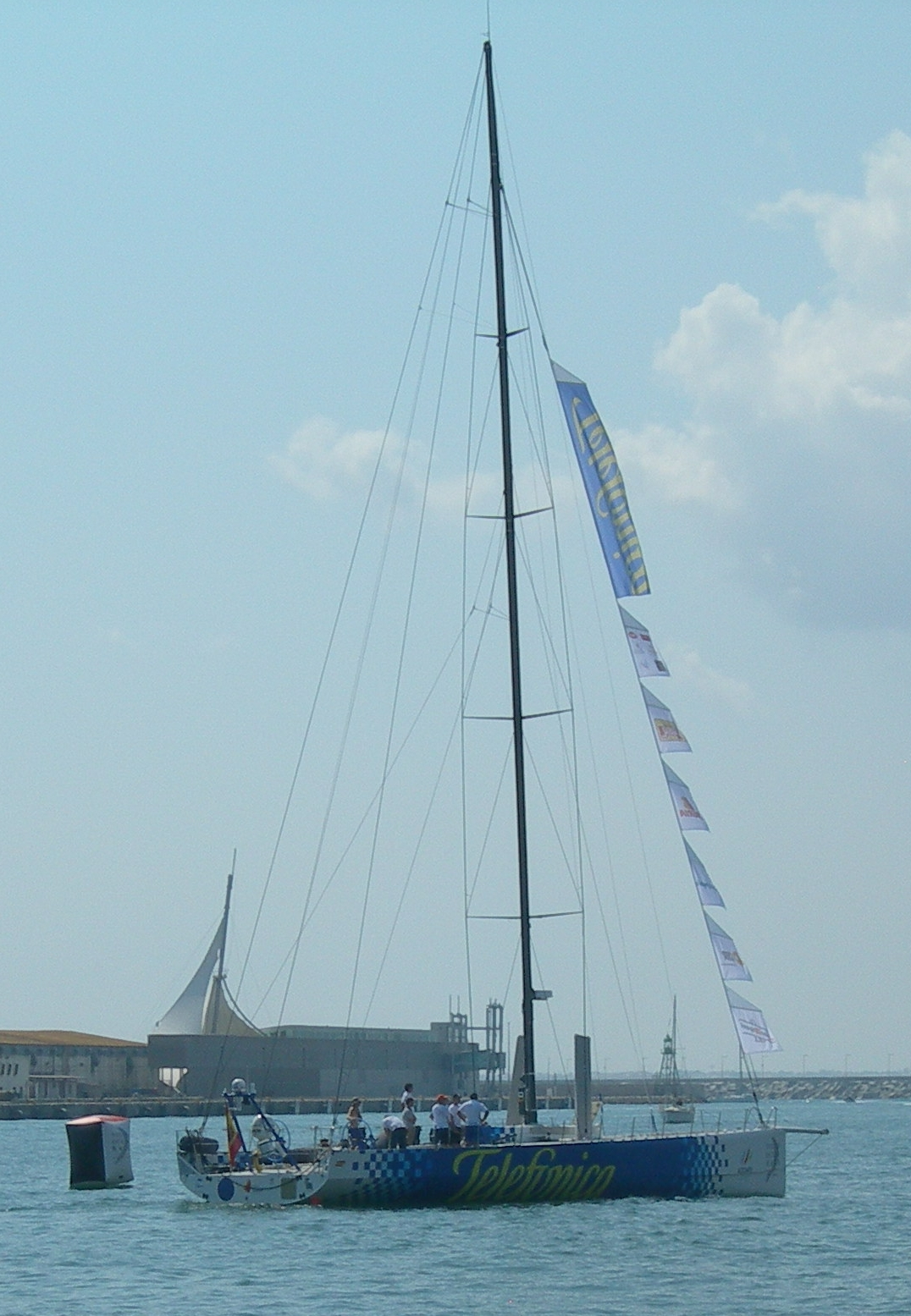
Telefonica Blue in Alicante, Spain.

=== Stopovers ===
==== Cape Town ====
Ericsson 4 won leg one of the 2008–09 Volvo Ocean Race from Alicante, Spain, to Cape Town in South Africa in a time of 21 days, 17 hours and 54 minutes.

==== Kochi ====
The second leg of began on 15 November 2008, with the sailors avoiding pirates off the coast of Somalia on their way to India.

==== Singapore ====
Telefonica Blue won leg three of the 2008–09 Volvo Ocean Race from Kochi, India, to Singapore in Singapore. Puma Ocean Racing finished in second place, whilst Ericsson 3 and Ericsson 4 finished in third and fourth places respectively. The race was described as very close, with the top four boats finishing the race within twenty minutes of each other. The race took ten days to complete, ending on 22 December 2008.

==== Qingdao ====
Telefonica Blue won leg four of the 2008–09 Volvo Ocean Race from Singapore in Singapore to Qingdao, China. Puma Ocean Racing finished in second place, whilst Ericsson 4 finished in third place. Telefonica Black, Ericsson 3 and Delta Lloyd all withdrew to sail to the Philippines and Taiwan for repairs. The leg lasted from 18 January until 29 January 2009.

==== Rio de Janeiro ====
Ericsson 3 won leg five, the longest leg at 12,300 miles (19,800 km), of the 2008–09 Volvo Ocean Race from Qingdao in China to Rio de Janeiro in Brazil, in a time of 40 days and five hours, arriving on 26 March 2009.

The teams left for Boston in the United States on leg five, which began on 11 April 2009.

==== Boston ====
The boats arrived in Boston in late April, with an in port race on 9 May. Leg 6 was won by Ericsson 4 at 21:05 GMT, 26 April 2009 after 15 days, 10 hours and 31 minutes of sailing

==== Galway ====
Ericsson 4 won leg seven of the 2008–09 Volvo Ocean Race from Boston in the United States to Galway, crossing the Atlantic Ocean in a time of seven days, 10 hours, 33 minutes and 51 seconds. Puma Ocean Racing finished in second place, one hour behind. Green Dragon finished in third position, whilst Telefonica Blue finished in fourth place.

Fáilte Ireland West sponsored the two-week Galway Stopover. It was expected that 140,000 people would visit Galway during the Stopover but the final total significantly outnumbered half a million, with some early reports suggesting that over 600,000 people had come to Galway to view the boats. €43 million was the economic total predicted for Galway from the events but the final total was anticipated to be over €80 million. Figures released the following November suggested the total was just under €56 million. The atmosphere and support in Galway was described positively.

At least 50,000 people watched the seven yachts leave Galway on Leg 8 of the race. Irish President Mary McAleese made a public speech before the sailors took off, noting their "extraordinary skill and resilience" which had "inspired all of us". Liu Biwei, China's ambassador to Ireland, spoke of how he favoured the Irish-Chinese pairing, and the fleet received several blessings. The sailors reported of the enjoyment they had in Galway, with Puma skipper Ken Read describing it as "the best stopover I have ever been involved with" saying he would return the following year after enjoying his time on the golf course and declaring that there was "something about Ireland and myself that seem to like each other".

Galway is expected to compete again for a stopover during the next race, with other Irish destinations such as Belfast and Dún Laoghaire expected to compete also.

==== Marstrand ====
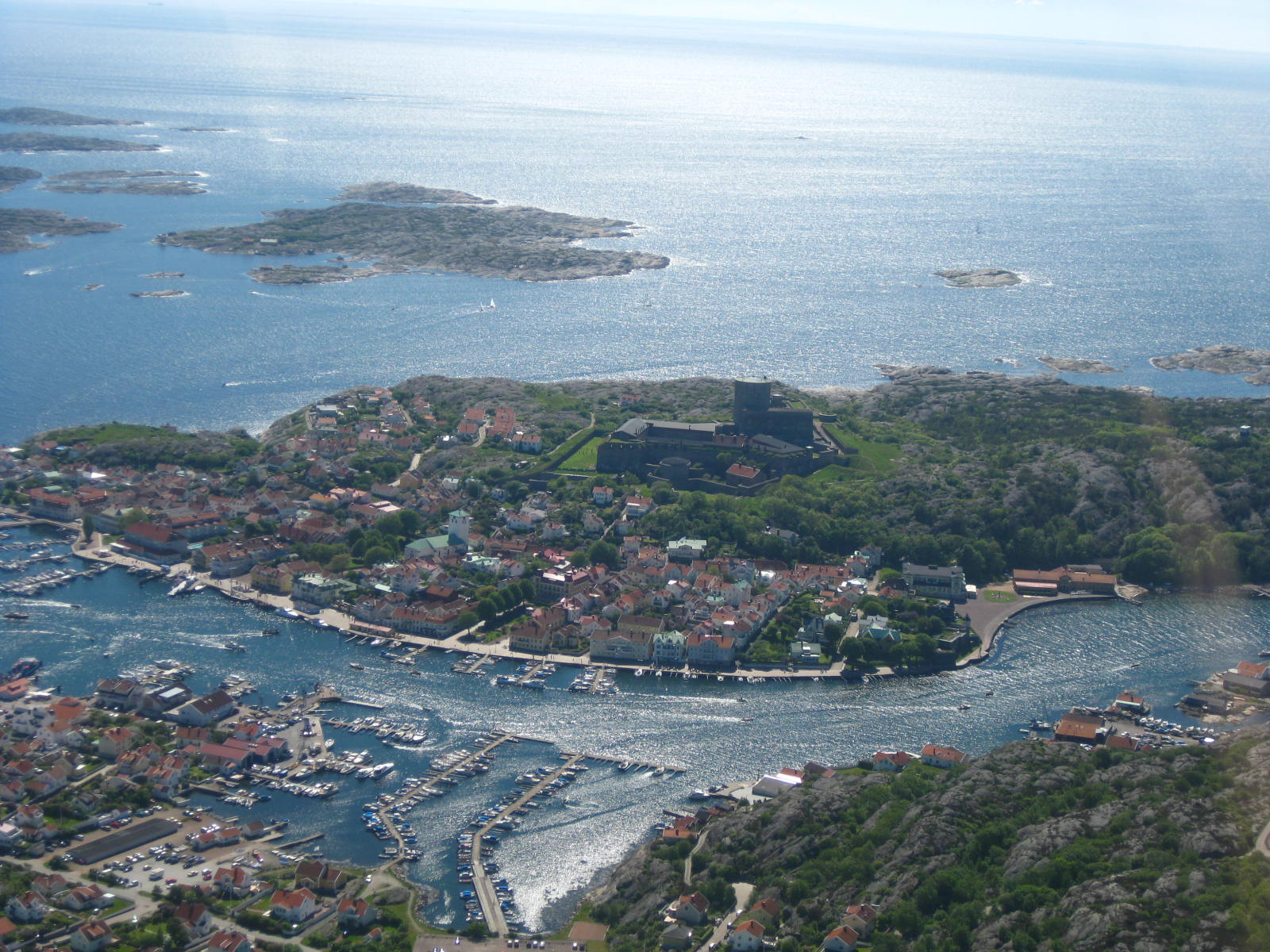
Marstrand, finish of leg eight and start of leg nine.

Ericsson 4 won leg eight of the 2008–09 Volvo Ocean Race from Galway to Marstrand in Sweden in a time of 12 hours and 57 minutes, their third consecutive victory and fifth overall Puma finished in second place and Green Dragon finished in third place. It was Green Dragon's second successive podium finish and, although they finished third, they had led for most of the race.

The boats left Galway Bay, journeying southward along the west coast of Ireland. They then travelled in a south-easterly direction across the Irish Sea to south England, moving in an eastwards direction up the English Channel. The teams then travelled up into the North Sea until arrival at the Baltic Sea.

==== Stockholm ====
Puma won leg nine of the 2008–09 Volvo Ocean Race from Marstrand to Stockholm in Sweden, their first win in the race. The third place for Ericsson 4 was enough for the team to also win the overall race at this point, leading to comparisons with the victor of the previous race, Mike Sanderson and ABN AMRO One, who won at the end of leg seven in Portsmouth, England, in 2006.

==== Saint Petersburg ====
Telefonica Black won the last leg of the 2008–09 Volvo Ocean Race from Stockholm to Saint Petersburg, covering the 400 miles (640 km) in a time of 1 day, 12 hours and 41 minutes. Puma Ocean Racing had led the race for most of the way. Ericsson 4, finished in third place.

== Stealth play ==
This race featured "Stealth play", a tactic that allowed a crew to hide its position from its competitors for a period of 12 hours. It was designed to add a tactical dimension to the race, whereby a team might opt to make a break from the fleet without the rest of the competitors knowing what they are doing and where they are on the race track. The ploy can first be used on leg one, leg two, leg five, leg six and leg seven. If it is not used on one leg, it cannot be accumulated for use on a following leg.

== Leg Results ==
#	Boat	Leg 1 (Spain) (South Africa)	Leg 2 (South Africa) (India)	Leg 3 (India) (Singapore)	Leg 4 (Singapore) (China)	Leg 5 (China) (Brazil)	Leg 6 (Brazil) (United States)	Leg 7 (United States) (Republic of Ireland)	Leg 8 (Republic of Ireland) (Sweden)	Leg 9 (Sweden) (Sweden)	Leg 10 (Sweden) (Russia)	Total
1	Ericsson 4	11.5	12	9	6	14.5	11.5	11	8	6	4	93.5
2	PUMA Ocean Racing	10	5	9.5	7	12	7.5	10.5	7	8	7	83.5
3	Telefónica Blue	6	9	11.5	8	8.5	10	9	5	2	6	75
4	Ericsson 3	4.5; PEN	9.5	8 PEN	4	15.5	8.5	4.5	2	7	5	68.5
5	Green Dragon	9	5	4.5	5	9.5	3	7	6	4	3	56
6	Telefónica Black	3.5	6.5	6	2 DNF	0 DNS	6	5	3	5	8	45
7	Delta Lloyd	3	3.5	1.5	2 DNF	0 DNS	6	5.5	4	3	2	30.5
8	Team Russia	3.5	3.5	3	0 DNS	0 DNS	0 DNS	0 DNS	0 DNS	0 DNS	0 DNS	10

== In-Port Race Results ==
#	Boat	IP1 (Spain)	IP2 (Singapore)	IP3 (China)	IP4 (Brazil)	IP5 (United States)	IP6 (Republic of Ireland)	IP7 (Sweden)	Total
1	Telefónica Blue	4	3	3.5	4	4	3.5	4	26
2	PUMA Ocean Racing	3	3.5	3	3.5	1.5	4	3.5	22
3	Ericsson 4	2.5	4	4	2.5	3.5	2	2.5	21
4	Telefónica Black	3.5	2.5	0 DNS	2	2	3	3	16
5	Delta Lloyd	1	1	0 DNS	3	3	1.5	1.5	11
6	Green Dragon	2	2	2.5	1.5	1	1	1	11
7	Ericsson 3	0.5; PEN	1.5	0 DNS	1	2.5	2.5	2	10
8	Team Russia	0.5	0 DNS	0 DNS	0 DNS	0 DNS	0 DNS	0 DNS	0.5

== Overall Results ==
Pos	Sail Number	Yacht	Country	Yacht Type	LOA (Metres)	Skipper	Points
1	SWE 4	Ericsson 4	Sweden	Juan-K Volvo Open 70	21.49	Torben Grael	114.5
2	USA 1948	PUMA Ocean Racing	United States	Botin Carkeek Volvo Open 70	21.49	Ken Read	105.5
3	ESP 12	Telefónica Blue	Spain	Farr Volvo Open 70	21.49	Bouwe Bekking	98^{1}
4	SWE 3	Ericsson 3	Sweden	Juan-K Volvo Open 70	21.49	Anders Lewander; Magnus Olsson	78.5
5	IRL 888	Green Dragon	(Republic of Ireland) Ireland; China	Reichel Pugh Volvo Open 70	21.49	Ian Walker	67
6	ESP 11	Telefónica Black	Spain	Farr Volvo Open 70	21.49	Fernando Echávarri	58^{2}
7	NED 1	Delta Lloyd	Netherlands	Juan-K Volvo Open 70	21.49	Ger O'Rourke; Roberto Bermúdez	41.5
8	RUS 1	Team Russia	Russia	Humphreys Volvo Open 70	21.49	Andreas Hanakamp	10.5

Notes

^1 – Telefónica Blue were penalised 3 points from their overall score for a rudder change after Leg 4.
^2 – Telefónica Black were penalised 3 points from their overall score for a rudder change after Leg 1.

=== Records ===
During Leg 1 "Ericsson 4", skippered by Torben Grael, broke the monohull 24 hour distance record when he sailed 596.6 nmi (1,104.9 km), an average of 24.85 kn (46.02 km/h).

=== Pictures ===
Stopover Stockholm 2009

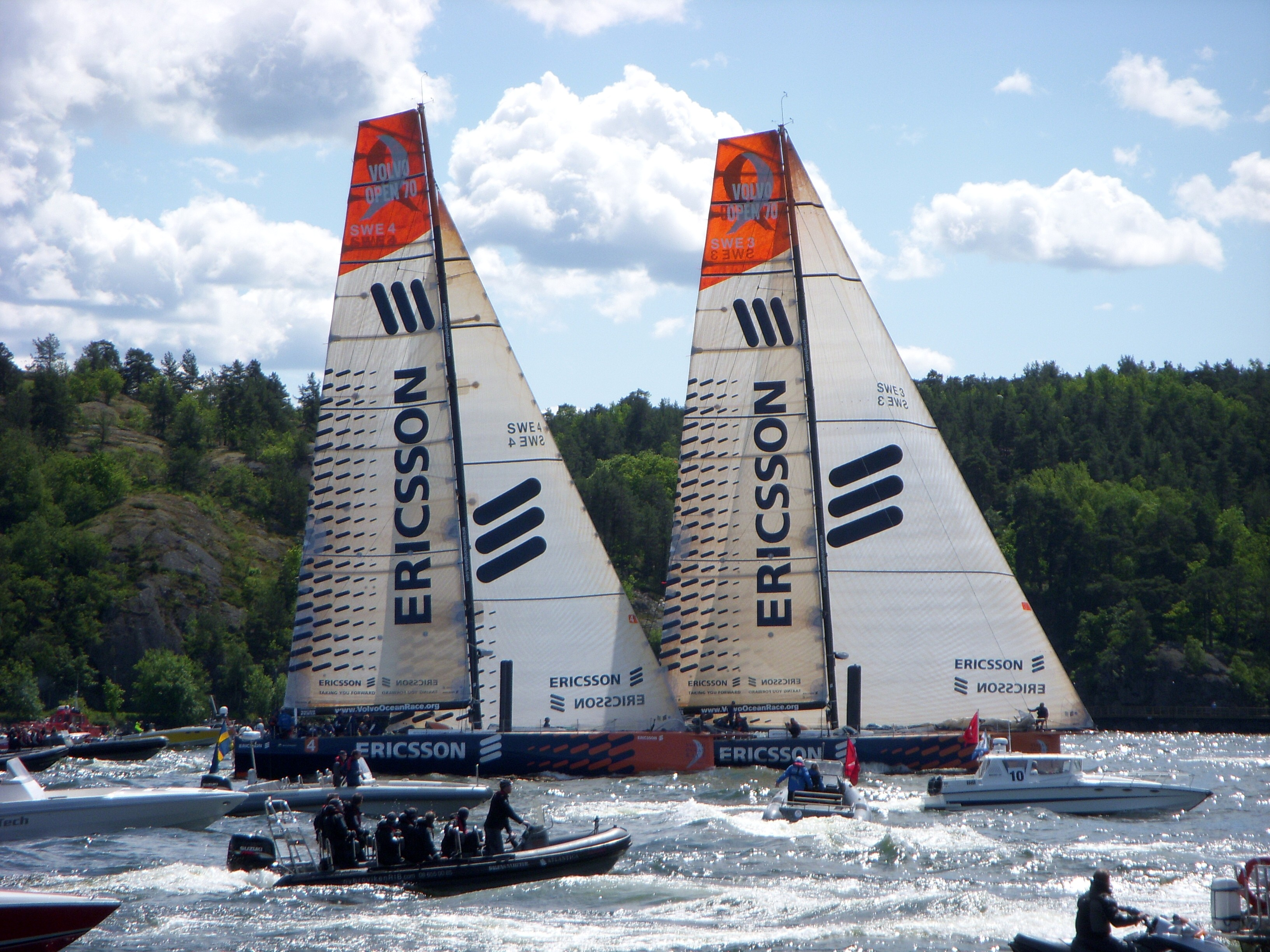
Ericsson 3 and Ericsson 4

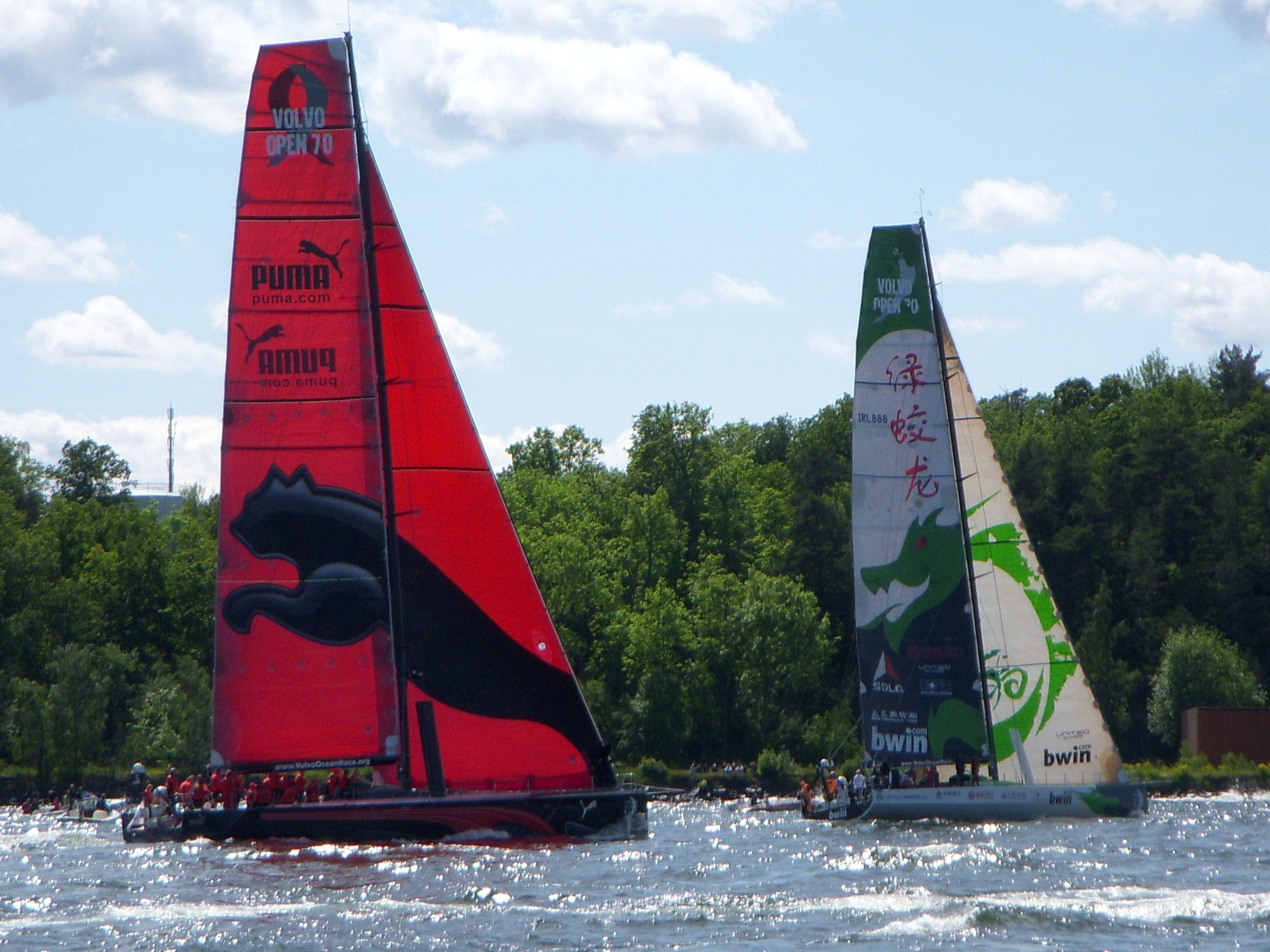
Puma and Green Dragon

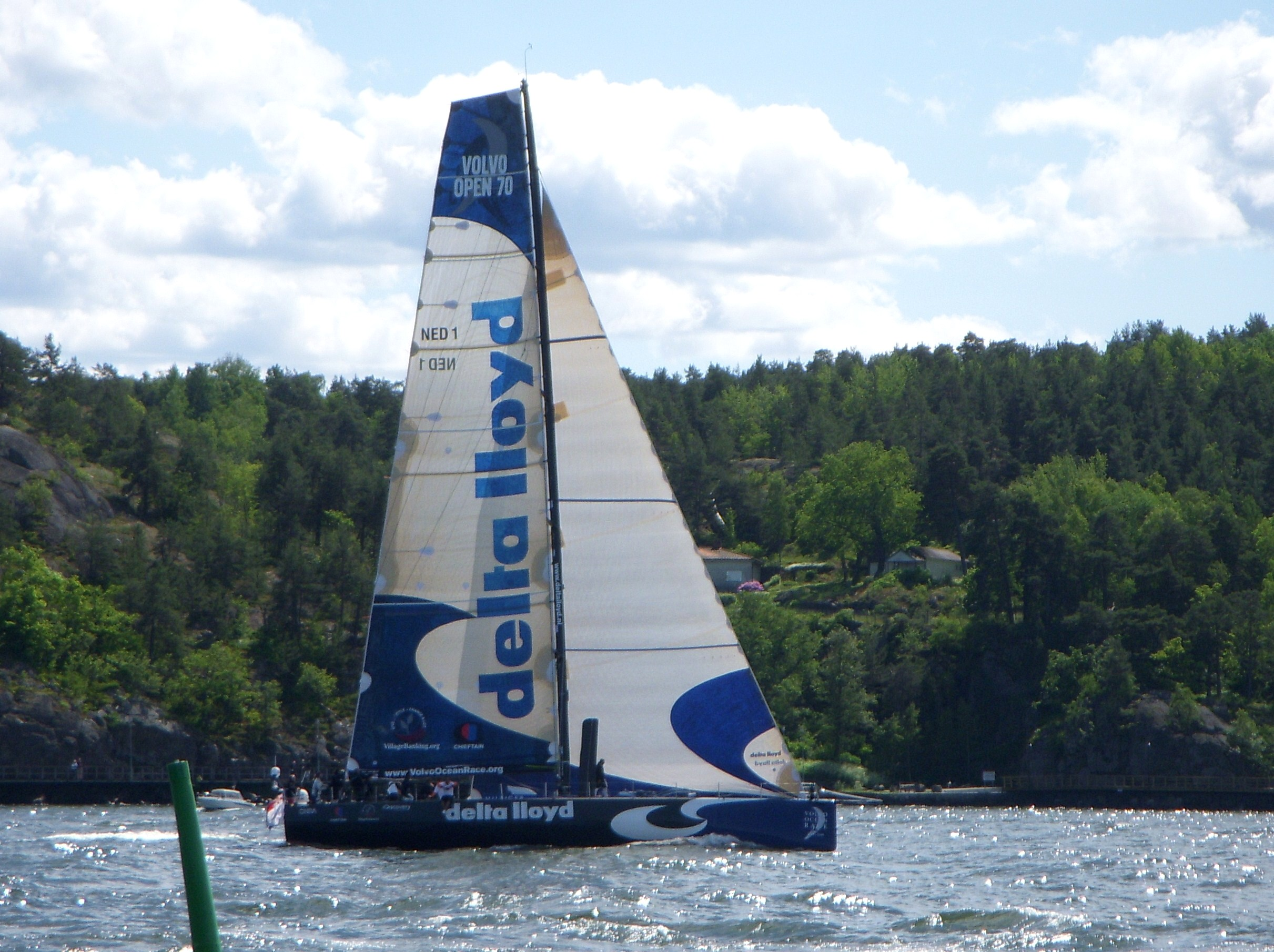
Delta Lloyd

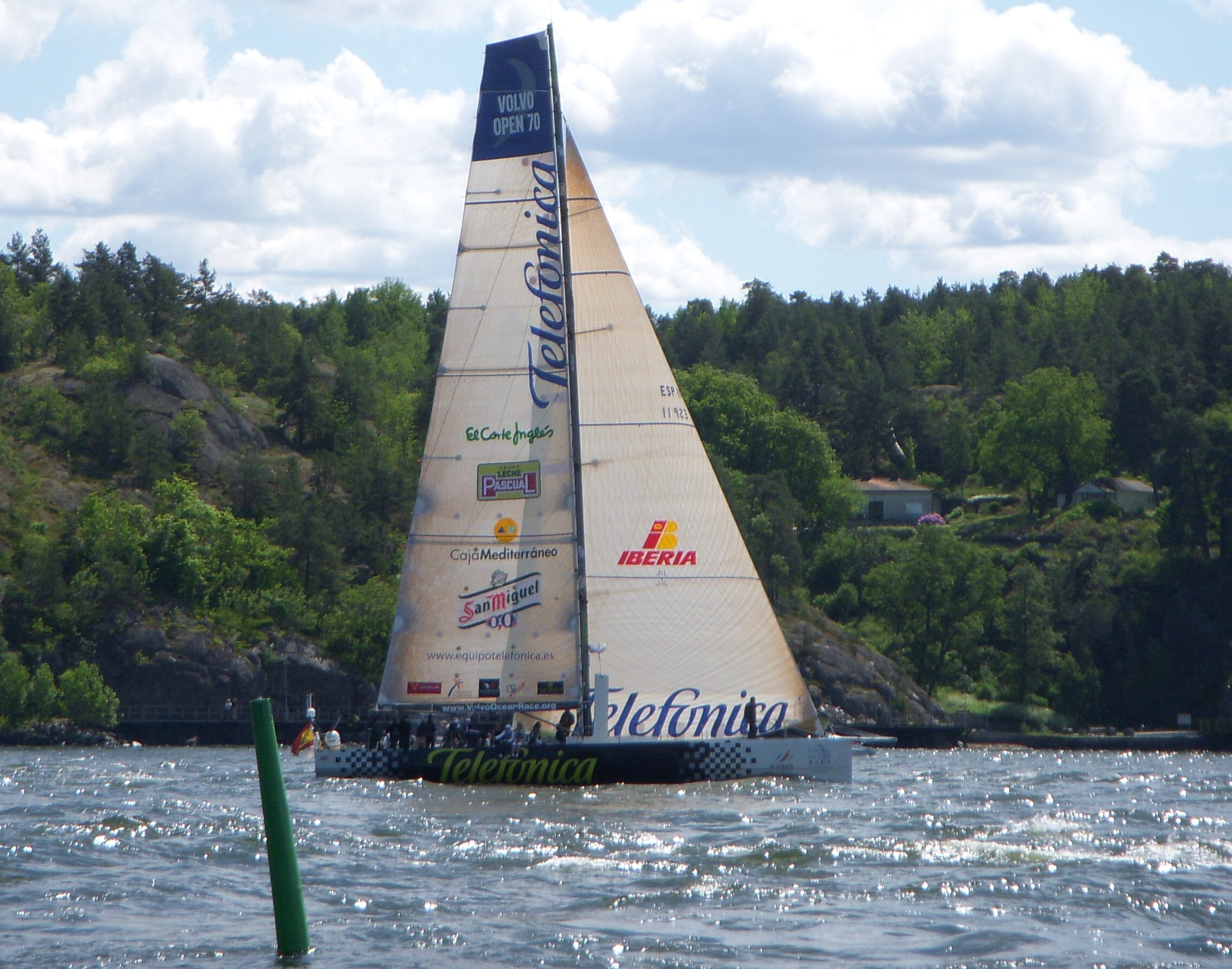
Telefonica Black
