= Lenta (retail) =

Hypermarket chain in Russia

- Company type: Public (PAO)
- Traded as: MCX: LNTA; LSE: LNTA
- Industry: Retail: Groceries, Consumer goods
- Founded: 1993; St. Petersburg, Russia
- Founder: Oleg Zherebtsov
- Headquarters: St. Petersburg, Russia
- Area served: Russia
- Key people: Vladimir Sorokin (CEO).
- Revenue: $6.57 billion (2021)
- Operating income: $345 million (2021)
- Net income: $169 million (2021)
- Total assets: $4.66 billion (2021)
- Total equity: $1.45 billion (2021)
- Owner: Lenta Ltd.
- Number of employees: 35100 (2014)
- Website: https://lenta.com

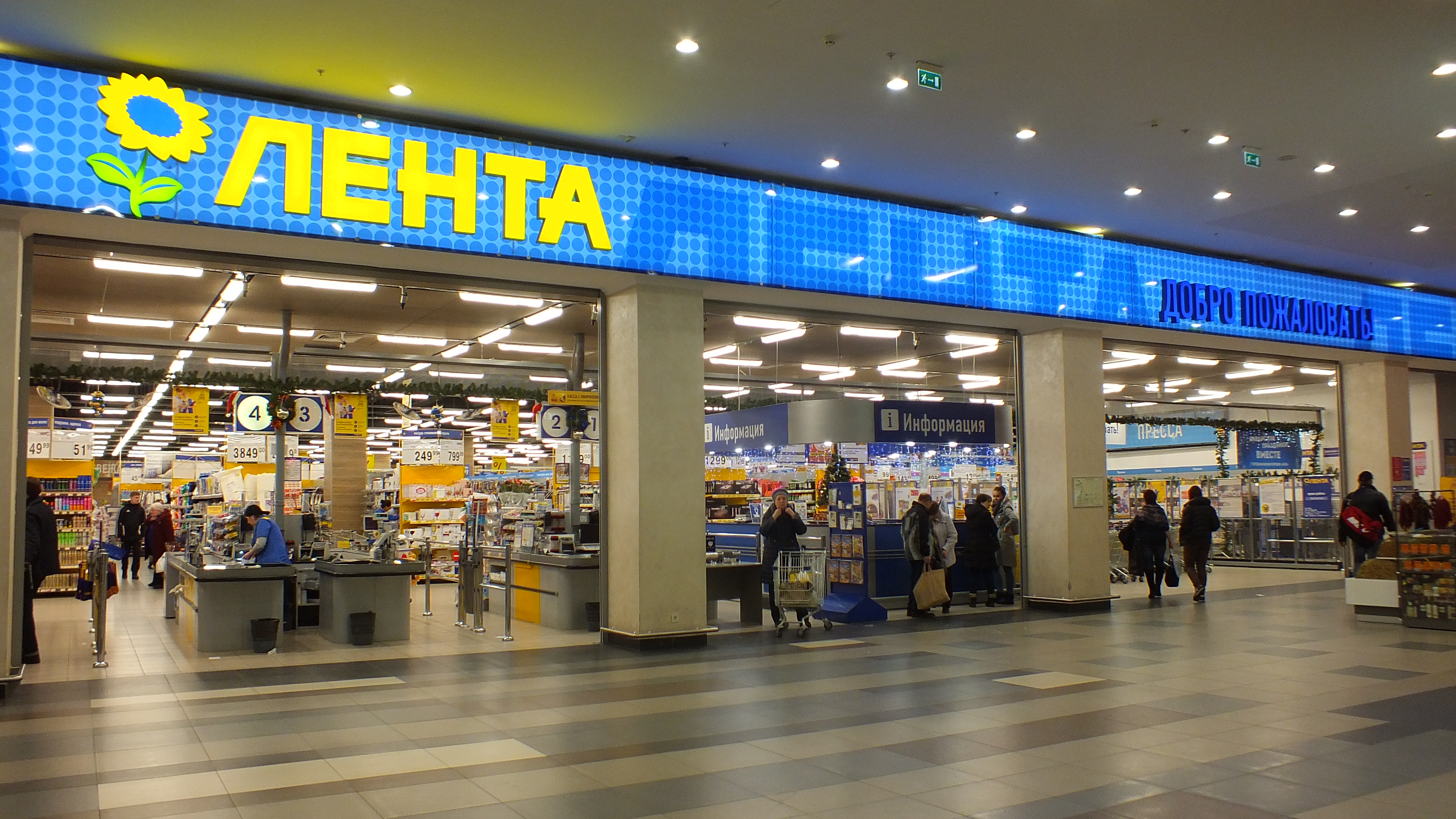
A Lenta supermarket in Moscow

Lenta (Russian: Лентa) is a Russian super- and hypermarket chain. With 149 locations across the country, it is one of Russia's largest retail chains in addition to being the country's second largest hypermarket chain.

Founded by Oleg Zherebtsov, Lenta opened its first cash and carry store in St. Petersburg, Russia, in October 1993. Lenta then registered its trademark in 1994. And, by 1999, it opened its first big-box hypermarket format and has expanded ever since. Now Lenta operates 122 hypermarkets in 63 cities across Russia and 27 supermarkets in the Moscow region with a total of approximately 787807 m^{2}. of selling space. The average Lenta hypermarket store has selling space of 6200 m^{2}. The company operates five distribution centres for hypermarkets. The company's stores base themselves on price-led hypermarkets and supermarket scheme. Lenta employs around 35,100 people.

Lenta’s largest shareholders include TPG Capital, the European Bank for Reconstruction and Development and VTB Capital. Global Depository Receipts (GDRs) of Lenta Ltd. are listed on the London Stock Exchange and on the Moscow Exchange.

The parent company of the chain – Lenta LLC – 100% belongs to Lenta Ltd., that is registered in the British Virgin Islands. 41,3% of shares belong to investment – TPG Capital and «VTB Capital» (35,5% and 4% respectively), 15,3% belongs to EBRD, minor shareholders share the rest. CEO of the chain is Herman Tinga.

On 18 May 2021, Lenta announced the purchase of 161 supermarkets of the Austrian Billa supermarket chain. The transaction amount was 215 million euros. In 2021, the company's revenue amounted to 496 billion rubles.

In February 2022, Lenta acquired Utkonos online-retailer from its shareholder, "Severgroup" of Alexey Mordashov, for 20 billion roubles.

== Operation ==
As of July 2019, the retail network includes 246 hypermarkets in 88 cities of Russia. Since 2013, the company has also been opening stores in the supermarket format. As of July 2019, 132 Lenta supermarkets operate in various regions of Russia.

== Owners and management ==
The network's parent company, Lenta LLC, is 100% owned by Lenta Ltd., a company registered in the British Virgin Islands. As of December 2020, the distribution of shares of the network is as follows:

- Severgroup LLC — 77.99%;
- Lenta LLC (quasi-treasury shares) — 0.93%;
- directors and management — 0.04%;
- shares in free circulation — 21.04%.

Until December 2018 for 9 years (since 2009), the company was headed by Ian Dunning, who in January 2019 he became President of the company "Magnit". He owns 0.584% of the shares of the Lenta company, the value of which is estimated at $ 10.1 million.

The CEO of the company since 2020 is Vladimir Sorokin. The Chairman of the Board of Directors is Alexey Mordashov. The Board of Directors also includes: Vladimir Sorokin, Steve Johnson, Michael Lynch Bell, Rood Pedersen, Yulia Solovyova, Roman Vasilkov, Thomas Korganas, Alexey Kulichenko.

In April 2015, Lenta's shareholders proportionally reduced their stakes in the retailer. TPG Group owns 35.55% of shares, the EBRD owns 15.3%, VTB Capital owns 5.8%, minority shareholders own 7.6%, the company's management owns 1.1%, and 34.6% of Lenta shares are in free circulation. Almost immediately after the SPO, the company announced the payment of dividends to its shareholders in the person of Lenta Ltd in the amount of 6 billion rubles. The facts show that shareholders are gradually getting rid of the "Tape". The reasons for the Western owners of the company are rather political, besides there is a threat of nationalization. On April 10, 2015 VTB Capital reduced its stake in Lenta to 4%, selling 3 million GDR.

On April 30, 2019 Severgroup completed the acquisition of global depositary receipts for shares of the retailer Lenta from the TPG investment fund and the European Bank for Reconstruction and Development (EBRD).
