= Canadian Wildlife Federation =

Canadian non-profit organization

- Founded: 1962
- Purpose: Environmentalism
- Location: Ottawa, Ontario
- Region served: Canada
- Method: Education, training, research, lobbying
- Members: Over 600,000
- Revenue: $34,400,000
- Website: cwf-fcf.org

The Canadian Wildlife Federation (French: Fédération canadienne de la faune) (CWF) is a Canadian non-profit organization dedicated to wildlife conservation.

== History and mission ==
The Canadian Wildlife Federation (CWF) was founded in 1961 and chartered in 1962.

The Canadian Wildlife Federation is devoted to teaching others to appreciate the natural world to ensure a lasting legacy of healthy wildlife and habitat.

To meet these goals, the Canadian Wildlife Federation:

- Informs and educates other Canadians on wildlife and natural habitats;
- Promotes responsible human actions and conservation; and
- Represents wildlife on conservation issues.

The Canadian Wildlife Federation aims to inform, educate and engage Canadians about wildlife through a variety of different methods. By doing this, CWF hopes to inspire other Canadians to donate and support the organization in order to run the programs that teach Canadians about wildlife. Finally, CWF aims to educate and increase awareness on problems concerning Canadian wildlife and how Canadians can aid in the conservation of natural environments.

== Education ==
The Canadian Wildlife Federation's Education department focuses its attention on connecting Canadians to wildlife along a continuum that moves participants from a broad awareness of wildlife issues to one where people take responsibility in their own communities to be ambassadors for species and habitat. Since 2014, CWF's education programming has reached more than 1,500,000 people in direct, face-to-face programming.

In October 2025, the federation and partners in conservation launched the Canadian Centre for Nature-based Education (CCNbE), a national initiative designed to expand hands-on, nature-based learning across Canada. The Centre focuses on supporting educators, strengthening environmental literacy, and improving equitable access to nature-based education for Indigenous, rural, urban, and other underserved communities.

CWF's education programs include:

=== WILD Spaces ===
A gardening program for schools, which teaches about habitat creation through gardening.

=== Wild Education ===
A teacher professional development program, that includes Project WILD, WILD About Sports (a program developed by Damian Foxall to connect sport participants with the natural world and conservation ethic.), and Below Zero (which focuses on winter conservation).

=== Gardening for Wildlife ===
Which includes a garden certification program and education to help people learn about wildlife friendly garden practices.

=== WILD Outside ===
A service learning program for 15 to 18 year olds that allows them to connect with the natural world and make a difference. In 2021, this program was a finalist in the Alberta Emerald Awards and the Nature Inspiration Awards and won the Calgary Award for Environmental Achievement and the Saskatchewan Award for the environment.

=== Canadian Conservation Corps ===
A service learning program for 18–30 year olds that combines service learning in the field with expeditionary travel over a period of 8 months and three stages.

== Species and Habitat ==
The Canadian Wildlife Federation's Species and Habitat department focuses much of its attention on the conservation of both marine and land mammals throughout Canada. The main areas of interest for the CWF are: Habitat Stewardship, Freshwater Conservation, Marine Conservation, Endangered Species, and Climate Change.

=== Habitat stewardship ===
The habitat stewardship program focuses primarily on habitat creation and restoration in both rural and urban communities as well as encouraging stewardship for private landowners.

=== Freshwater conservation ===
Canada houses many freshwater sources throughout the country including lakes and rivers, which are responsible for nearly 9% of the global renewable water energy supply. This abundance of freshwater also houses many species of fish, birds, amphibians, insects and other species of wildlife.

Research and creating awareness among the public is focused on four main areas:

- Habitat Protection and Restoration;
- Aquatic Invasive Species;
- Conserving Freshwater Wildlife Populations; and
- Reducing the Impact of Water Pollution on Wildlife.

=== Marine conservation ===
As Canada has a vast coastline (234,000 km), bordered by three oceans, the federation works hard to maintain the health of the marine life.

The key areas focused on include:

- Reducing the impact of Fisheries on Marine Wildlife;
- Marine Pollution; and
- Marine Protected Areas.

Over fishing is a major area of interest as it is crucial to maintain ample food for marine life that relies on these areas for winter grounds or having their young.

=== Endangered species ===
The Canadian Wildlife Federation implemented an Endangered Species Program to aid in the conservation of threatened species throughout Canada. Extensive research is performed to identify the reason behind the decrease in wildlife population, and the most appropriate method that can be used to ensure the population will increase. The Ministry of Natural Resources and the CWF (along with other organizations) combine their knowledge in order to have unanimous conservation methods between organizations. Other projects include reintroducing threatened species back into their natural habitat to increase population diversity. The CWF also aims to influence government regulations regarding endangered species in order to promote longevity of the species.

=== Climate change ===
Climate change is a global issue that researchers believe will have serious, negative consequences in the future, but its current effect on wildlife is apparent. The adaptations that many species have undergone to adjust to the varying climate include shifting their migratory ranges, migrating earlier or later than usual, and changing hibernation patterns.

The CWF focuses on three areas of climate change:

- Using Habitat Restoration and Conservation to Store Carbon;
- Planning for Wildlife Adaptation to Climate Change; and
- Advocating for Strong Carbon Emission Reduction Targets for Canada.

== Publications ==
The Canadian Wildlife Federation published Checkerspot, a biannual climate change magazine. A free magazine, its inaugural issue was launched May 2007; it ceased production in 2009 due to the economic downturn of that year. Named after a butterfly whose ranges were believed to be shifting as a result of global warming, Checkerspot claimed to be a climate neutral publication. CWF used Checkerspot to advance activism on and promote discussions about climate change.

== Affiliates and partners ==
The Canadian Wildlife Federation works with all levels of the Government of Canada in addition to businesses for the purpose of meeting their goals, which are to increase awareness for the welfare of wildlife in Canada. The CWF works with provincial and territorial governments, federal agencies, organizations and Environment Canada. Some national partners include: Canadian Wildlife Service, Parks Canada, Royal Botanical Gardens (Ontario) and Atlas of Canada. The many partners of the CWF provide financial support and aid with resources to help protect wildlife. The financial support and resources that these partners offer help to increase awareness and stewardship of wildlife preservation in Canada.

In 2010, the Canadian Wildlife Federation organized the first annual "Walk for Wildlife". This walk runs during National Wildlife Week (April 10–16). The purpose of this walk is to raise awareness about sustainable forest management and conservation of habitats for Canadian wildlife. The walk runs across Canada, where communities host local events. All of this can be made possible because of the many partners and sponsors of the CWF.
