= Mike Bossley =

Australian environmentalist and dolphin researcher

Michael Ion Bossley AM is an Australian cetacean researcher and environmentalist.

== Career ==
Bossley worked as a university lecturer, teaching environmental studies and marine biology for 30 years. In his early years, he advocated for several environmental groups in his spare time.

Bossley established the Australian Dolphin Research Foundation, which was the precursor to the Adelaide branch of Whale and Dolphin Conservation (WDC) Australasia. He was WDC's Manager of Science and Education in Australasia until his retirement in June 2015, after 12 years of working with the organisation.

He was also the first director of Greenpeace Australia and participated in anti-whaling and anti-nuclear weapons testing campaigns.

His work led to the establishment of the Adelaide Dolphin Sanctuary in South Australia's Port River estuary in 2005, which is home to a combination of resident and visiting bottlenose dolphins.

Bossley served as an Australian delegate on the International Whaling Commission, on behalf of the Australian Government, for six years, and has made submissions to many submissions to governments. He has also made presentations at many international conferences.

After retirement from the WDC, Bossley stayed on as a part-time consultant, devoting his time to the New Zealand dolphin campaign.

Bossley has also served as president of the Friends of Gulf St Vincent, and was made a life member in 2020.

== Honours ==
- 2005: South Australian award for Australian of the Year for his work in dolphin research and conservation
- 2006: Member of the Order of Australia "for service to the protection of marine mammals as a biologist, academic and conservationist and through involvement with a range of organisations that aim to protect these species"

== Publications ==
Bossley's 2022 book Whales, Dolphins and Me was published by Moonglow Publishing, and chronicles his life's work in marine conservation.

He is also author or co-author of several published scientific papers, including:

- Bossley M, Steiner A, Rankin RW, Bejder L (2016). "A long-term study of bottlenose dolphins (Tursiops aduncus) in an Australian industrial estuary: increased sightings associated with environmental improvements". Marine Mammal Science. 33: 277–290. doi:10.1111/mms.12368.
- Bossley M, Steiner A, Brakes P, Shrimpton J, Foster C, Rendell L (September 2018). "Tail walking in a bottlenose dolphin community: the rise and fall of an arbitrary cultural 'fad'". Biol. Lett. 14 (9). doi:10.1098/rsbl.2018.0314. PMC 6170752. PMID 30185606.
