= Magnus Olsson (sailor) =

Swedish sailor

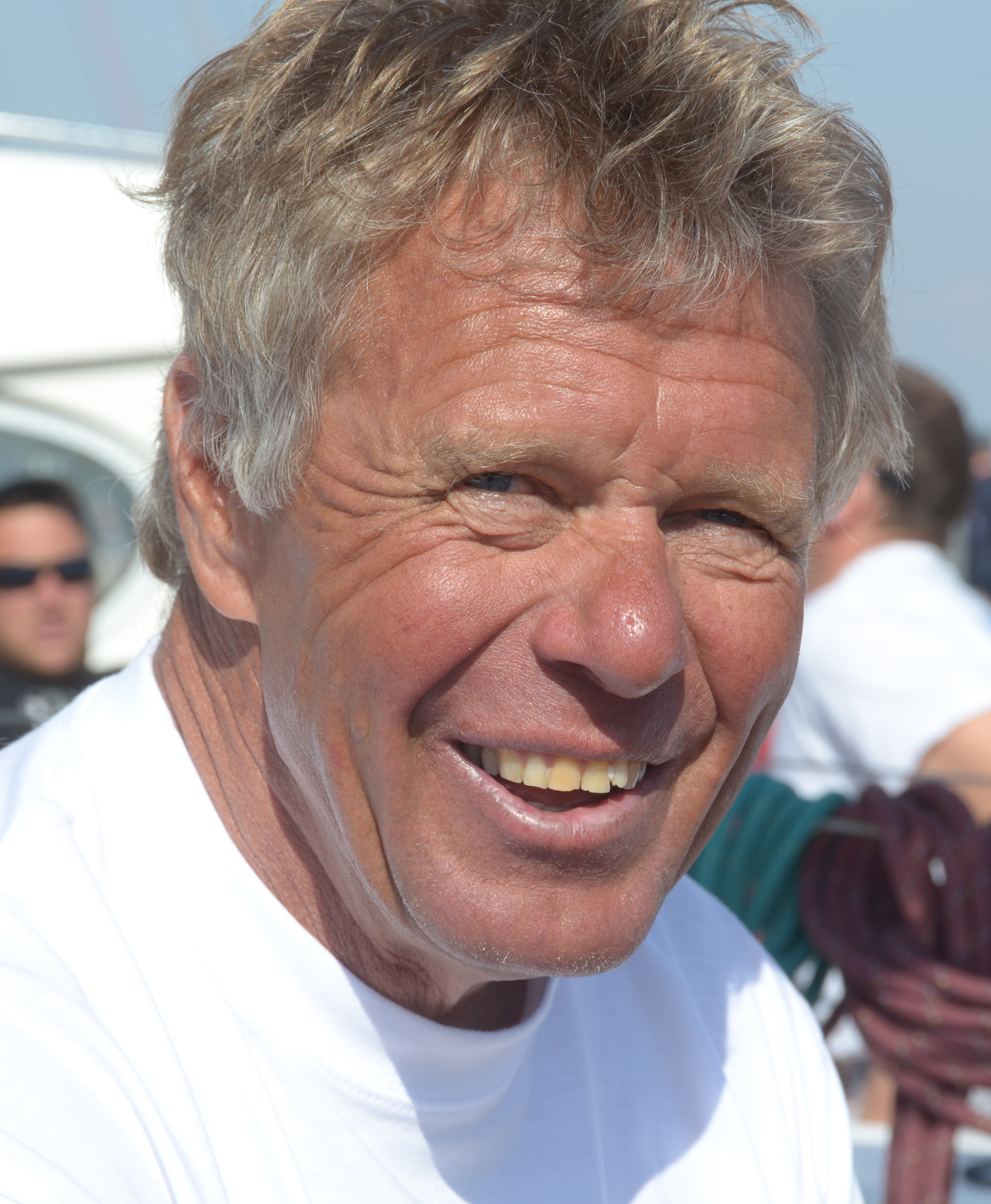
- Magnus Olsson (2012)

Personal information
- Born: 4 January 1949 Bromma, Stockholm
- Died: 20 April 2013 (aged 64) Spain

Sailing career
- Sport: Sailing
- Class(es): 505, 12mR, VO60, VO70

Magnus Olsson (4 January 1949 in Bromma, Stockholm – 20 April 2013 in Spain) was a Swedish competitive sailor.

He took part in six Whitbread/Volvo Ocean races between 1985 and 2009. He won the 1997–98 race with the EF Language.

Magnus Olsson was a coach of Volvo Ocean Race Team SCA until April 2013, when he suffered a stroke and died at a hospital in Lanzarote.

== Achievements ==
Pos.	Role	Year	Event	Class	Boat name	Note	Ref
Round the world races
8/15		1985–1986	1985–1986 Whitbread Round the World Race	Maxi	Drum		
5/23		1989–1990	1985–1986 Whitbread Round the World Race	Maxi Ketch	The Card		
2/10		1993–1994	1993–1994 Whitbread Round the World Race	Whitbread 60	Intrum Justitia		
1/10		1997–1998	1997–1998 Whitbread Round the World Race	Volvo Ocean 60	EF Language		
2/8		2001–2002	2001–2002 Volvo Ocean Race	Volvo Ocean 60	Assa Abloy		
5/7	Skipper	2008–2009	2008–2009 Volvo Ocean Race	Volvo Open 70	Ericsson 3	Mentor of youth team who became skipper	
Other Events
31st		2002	Melges 24 World Championships	Melges 24		Travemünde, Germany	
