= Chuny Bermúdez =

Spanish sailor

Personal information
- Nationality: Spanish
- Born: 1 March 1970 (age 55)

Sport
- Sport: Sailing

Chuny Bermúdez (born 1 March 1970) is a Spanish sailor. He competed in the Star event at the 2004 Summer Olympics.
