= Whale and Dolphin Conservation =

UK wildlife charity

Whale and Dolphin Conservation (WDC)
- Founded: 1987
- Type: Conservation Charity (Registered Charity No. 1014705)
- Location: Brookfield House, 38 St Paul Street, Chippenham, Wiltshire SN15 1LJ, UK
- Region served: Worldwide
- Method: Research, conservation, lobbying and negotiation
- Key people: Chris Butler-Stroud (Chief Executive)
- Website: uk.whales.org

Whale and Dolphin Conservation (WDC), formerly Whale and Dolphin Conservation Society in the UK, is a wildlife charity that is dedicated solely to the worldwide conservation and welfare of all whales, dolphins and porpoises (cetaceans). It has offices in the UK, North America, Germany and Australia.

== History ==
WDC was established in the UK in 1987. Its headquarters are in Chippenham in Wiltshire, UK. Until late 2012, it was known as the Whale and Dolphin Conservation Society.

Mike Bossley established the Australian Dolphin Research Foundation, which was the precursor to the Adelaide branch of WDC Australasia. He was WDC's Manager of Science and Education in Australasia until his retirement in June 2015, after 12 years of working with the organisation. After retirement, he stayed on as a part-time consultant, devoting his time to the New Zealand dolphin campaign.

== Description ==
Today it is a leading NGO solely dedicated to the protection of cetaceans and their living environments. WDC operates worldwide with offices in Munich, Germany; Adelaide, South Australia; Wiltshire, UK; and Massachusetts, United States.

WDC is a partner of the Convention on Migratory Species (CMS, also known as the Bonn Convention), which is part of the United Nations Environment Programme. The organisation also develops regional protection agreements and conventions and closely cooperates with the orca (killer whale) research station OrcaLab in British Columbia, Canada.

== Wildlife visitor centre ==
The flagship Scottish Dolphin Centre is based at the mouth of the River Spey on the southern shore of the Moray Firth on the east coast of Scotland. On the north side of the Firth lies Chanonry Point which is reputed to be one of the best spots in the UK to view bottlenose dolphin (Tursiops truncatus) from the land.

== See also ==
- Adelaide Dolphin Sanctuary
