= Victor Harbor Road =

Road in South Australia

Victor Harbor Road Adelaide Road, Hindmarsh Road, Torrens Street South Australia
- Coordinates: 35.181459°S 138.495020°E (North end); 35.555966°S 138.620677°E (South end)

General information
- Type: Road
- Length: 50.3 km (31 mi)
- Route number(s): A13 (1998–present) Entire route; Concurrencies: B34 (1998–present) (through Willunga Hill); B37 (1998–present) (through Victor Harbor)

Major junctions
- North end: South Road; Old Noarlunga, Adelaide
- Brookman Road; Pages Flat Road; Port Elliot Road
- South end: Victoria Street; Victor Harbor, South Australia

Location(s)
- Region: Southern Adelaide, Fleurieu and Kangaroo Island
- Major suburbs: Willunga, Mount Compass, Hindmarsh Valley

Victor Harbor Road (and its southern sections Adelaide Road, Hindmarsh Road and Torrens Street through Victor Harbor) is a major road in South Australia that runs south from Main South Road at Old Noarlunga on the southern fringes of suburban Adelaide to Victor Harbor on the Fleurieu Peninsula. It is designated part of route A13.

== Route ==
Victor Harbor Road begins at the intersection with Main South Road at Old Noarlunga. It heads south through the McLaren Vale region, bypassing the towns of McLaren Vale and Willunga. It passes through Mount Compass, until it reaches Hindmarsh Valley, on the northern fringes of Victor Harbor.

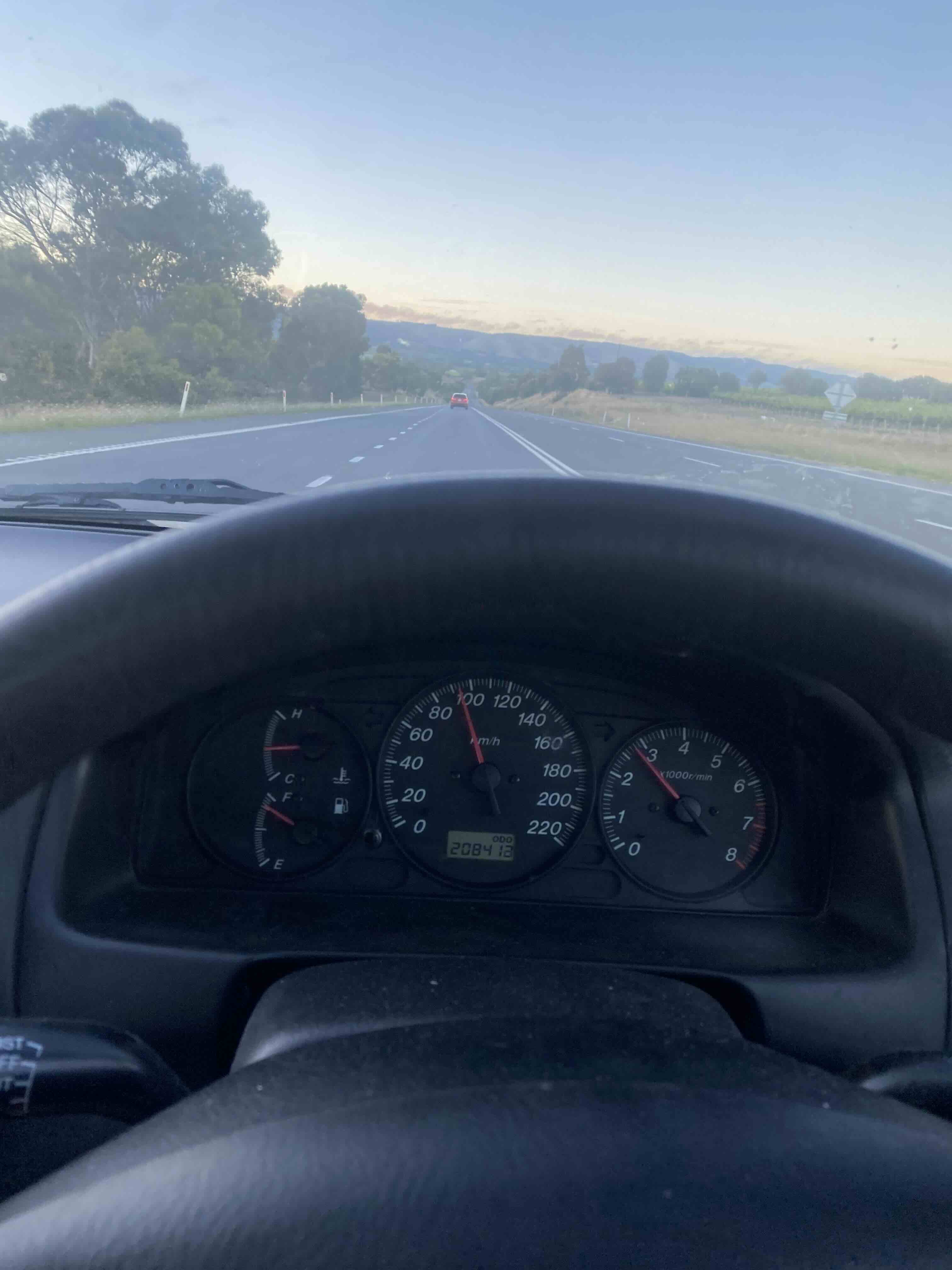
The sun rising over Victor Harbor Road.

There, it changes name to Adelaide Road, and continues south to meet with Port Elliot Road at Hayborough. It continues southwest as Hindmarsh Road, changing name to Torrens Street in central Victor Harbor, before ending at the intersection with Victoria Street in the city centre.

== History ==
From Old Noarlunga the road originally ran southeast to McLaren Vale, then straight south to Willunga, before climbing the Willunga Escarpment with a steep, winding narrow section called 'Willunga Hill'. In the 1970s, a diversion was constructed, bypassing McLaren Vale and Willunga to the west through the McLaren Vale vineyards. It included a new 4-lane section climbing the Willunga Escarpment of the Mount Lofty Ranges.

The steep winding ascent of the old road, now known as 'Old Willunga Hill' to differentiate it from the newer road, is regularly featured as part of cycling events such as the Tour Down Under due to its challenging climb. After ascending the new 'Willunga Hill', the road levels and rejoins its old route, gently descending to the town of Mount Compass.

=== Safety and upgrades ===
Traffic on the road has increased in recent years due to the rapidly increasing population of the coastal towns between Victor Harbor and Hindmarsh Island, and an expanding local tourism industry. Because of this, the road has had high numbers of fatalities. 14 people lost their lives and 163 people were injured during 2000-2004. Due to its local notoriety, the road has had significant works since early 2004, with resurfacing, overtaking lanes, increased police attention and the reduction of speed limits.

The Royal Automobile Association (RAA) rated the highway at a 4.5/10 which means it failed to pass certain benchmarks. RAA believes that if the road is duplicated, it will improve safety on the road remarkably.

The northern end of Victor Harbor Road, where it joins South Road, was for many years an unsignalled T-junction. Traffic travelling towards Adelaide on Victor Harbor road would have to stop at the intersection, and wait to turn right to South Road. South Road was often quite busy, and this caused congestion, with a line regularly reaching 500 metres, and sometimes even extending back a whole kilometre to Robinson Road. Due to this, driver impatience was a regular occurrence, and was the cause of a number of crashes at the location.

Between September 2009 and June 2010, major upgrades were undertaken at the intersection, greatly increasing safety at the intersection. The single lane and stop system was replaced with traffic lights, with Victor Harbor Road widening to 3 lanes just before the intersection, and South Road widened to 3 lanes. This also increased the ease of turning onto Seaford Road. The South Road/Seaford Road/Patapinda Road intersection about 300 metres north on South Road was also upgraded.

Heading south on South Road, Victor Harbor Road and South Road have both been widened with an additional 3rd lane, giving 2 lanes for the turn onto Victor Harbor Road, as well as 2 lanes to continue on South Road.

The intersection of Victor Harbor Road and Main Road, McLaren Vale, was notorious for fatal crashes. A freeway-style intersection, with a Main Road overpass, was completed in 2013.

In 2021, Victor Harbor Road was duplicated to Robinson Road, and a roundabout was constructed at this intersection. Stage 2 was recently completed, providing a duplicated road to the McLaren Vale intersection.

== Major intersections ==
LGA	Location	km	mi	Destinations	Notes
Onkaparinga	Old Noarlunga	0.0	0.0	Main South Road (A13 northeast, B23 southwest) – Darlington, Aldinga	Northern terminus of Victor Harbor Road, route A13 continues northeast along Main South Road
Onkaparinga	McLaren Vale	4.4	2.7	Main Road – McLaren Vale	
Onkaparinga	Whites Valley–Willunga boundary	11.8	7.3	Aldinga Road – Aldinga, Willunga	
Alexandrina	Willunga Hill	16.7	10.4	Brookman Road (B34 northeast) – Meadows, Hahndorf	Concurrency with route B34
Alexandrina	Willunga Hill	18.3	11.4	Pages Flat Road (B34 southwest) – Myponga	Concurrency with route B34
Alexandrina	Mount Compass	24.6	15.3	Nangkita Road – Nangkita	
Alexandrina	Mount Compass	28.1	17.5	Goolwa Road – Currency Creek	
Alexandrina	Hindmarsh Valley–Mount Jagged boundary	38.0	23.6	Crows Nest Road – Port Elliot	
Victor Harbor	Hindmarsh Valley	42.9	26.7	Hindmarsh Tiers Road – Hindmarsh Tiers, Myponga	
Victor Harbor	Hindmarsh–McCracken–Hayborough tripoint	46.2	28.7	Strawberry Hills Road – Hayborough	Name change: Victor Harbor Road (north), Adelaide Road (south)
Victor Harbor	McCracken–Hayborough boundary	47.3	29.4	Port Elliot Road (B37 east) – Port Elliot, Goolwa	Northern terminus of concurrency with route B37; Name change: Adelaide Road (north), Hindmarsh Road (southwest)
Victor Harbor	Victor Harbor	49.7	30.9	Seaview Road (east) – Inman Valley; Eyre Terrace (east) – Victor Harbor	Name change: Hindmarsh Road (northeast), Torrens Street (southwest)
Victor Harbor	Victor Harbor	50.3	31.3	Victoria Street (B37 west, unallocated east) – Parawa, Delamere	Southern terminus of Torrens Street and route A13; Southern terminus of concurrency with route B37, continues west along Victoria Street
Route transition

== See also ==
- Highways in Australia
- List of highways in South Australia
