= Hayborough =

Hayborough South Australia
- Coordinates: 35°31′55″S 138°38′59″E
- Population: 2,240 (2016 census)
- Postcode(s): 5211
- Time zone: ACST (UTC+9:30)
  - Summer (DST): ACST (UTC+10:30)
- Location: 3 km (2 mi) NE of Victor Harbor; 3 km (2 mi) W of Port Elliot; 81 km (50 mi) S of Adelaide city centre
- LGA(s): City of Victor Harbor
- Region: Fleurieu and Kangaroo Island
- County: Hindmarsh
- State electorate(s): Finniss
- Federal division(s): Mayo
Mean max temp	Mean min temp	Annual rainfall
20.6 °C; 69 °F	10.3 °C; 51 °F	551.8 mm 21.7 in
Suburbs around Hayborough:
Hindmarsh Valley	Hindmarsh Valley	Hindmarsh Valley
McCracken	Hayborough	Chiton
Encounter Bay	Encounter Bay	Encounter Bay
- Footnotes: Adjoining localities

Hayborough is a north-eastern suburb of the South Australian town of Victor Harbor, located on the south coast of Fleurieu Peninsula.

In the 2006 census, Hayborough had a population of 1,847, with a median age of 47—lower than the region as a whole, but significantly higher than the state or national average.

The suburb contains a pharmacy, a child care centre and a small shopping centre, and is serviced by a bus service offered by Stateliner that connects the Adelaide city centre to Goolwa and Victor Harbor.

On 7 June 2018, the suburb of Hayborough was split along the existing council boundary with the part to the east in the Alexandrina Council becoming the new suburb of Chiton, and the Victor Harbor side in the west retaining the name Hayborough.
