= Chiton, South Australia =

Chiton South Australia
- Coordinates: 35°31′51″S 138°39′28″E
- Population: 440 (SAL 2021)
- Established: 7 June 2018
- Postcode(s): 5211
- Time zone: ACST (UTC+9:30)
  - Summer (DST): ACST (UTC+10:30)
- Location: 67 km (42 mi) S of Adelaide; 11 km (7 mi) W of Goolwa
- LGA(s): Alexandrina Council
- Region: Fleurieu and Kangaroo Island
- County: Hindmarsh
- State electorate(s): Finniss
- Federal division(s): Mayo
| Mean max temp | Mean min temp | Annual rainfall |
| 20.6 °C; 69 °F | 10.3 °C; 51 °F | 551.8 mm 21.7 in |
Suburbs around Chiton:
| Hindmarsh Valley | Hindmarsh Valley; Port Elliot | Port Elliot |
| Hayborough | Chiton | Port Elliot |
| Encounter Bay | Encounter Bay | Encounter Bay |
- Footnotes: Locations; Adjoining localities

Chiton is a locality in the Australian state of South Australia located on the south coast of Fleurieu Peninsula about 67 kilometres (42 mi) south of the state capital of Adelaide and about 11 kilometres (6.8 mi) west of the municipal seat of Goolwa.

Chiton consists of land bounded by the alignment of Ocean Road to the west, Waterport Road to the north, the alignment of Brickyard Road in part to the east and Port Elliot Road and the coastline with Encounter Bay to the south.

Boundaries for the locality were created on 7 June 2018 via the division of the existing suburb of Hayborough along the boundary between the local government areas of the Alexandrina Council and the City of Victor Harbor. The name change was requested by local residents via the Alexandrina Council. Chiton is a “long established name” within the locality and which has been used for a rocky coastal feature and for the name of a surf lifesaving club.

Chiton is located within the federal division of Mayo, the state electoral district of Finniss and the local government area of the Alexandrina Council.
