= Victor Harbor Times =

Regional newspaper in South Australia

The Victor Harbor Times
- Type: Weekly newspaper
- Owner: Australian Community Media
- Founded: August 1912
- Language: English
- City: Victor Harbor, South Australia
- Website: victorharbortimes.com.au

The Times, also known as The Victor Harbor Times, is a newspaper published weekly in Victor Harbor, South Australia, since August 1912. Its title has, as with most regional newspapers, undergone a series of name changes and simplifications over its history. It was later sold to Rural Press, previously owned by Fairfax Media, but now an Australian media company trading as Australian Community Media.

== History ==
The newspaper was originally published as The Victor Harbor Times and Encounter Bay and Lower Murray Pilot, with the first edition published on Friday 23 August 1912 (its title used "Harbour" from 8 September 1922).

On 16 May 1930, the title was briefly altered to The Times Victor Harbour and Encounter Bay and Lower Murray Pilot.

From 15 April 1932 to 22 March 1978, it was published weekly (variously on a Friday (1932-1973), Thursday (1973) and Wednesday (1974-1978)) and called Victor Harbour Times. Between 30 March 1978 and 31 December 1986 it was called Victor Harbor Times. From 7 January 1987, the header was simplified further. For 11 years, from 1 August 1984 to 17 November 1995, it was published bi-weekly. The newspaper then started publishing Thursdays from 5 June 1997.

=== Ownership and locations ===
From 1922, the business operated from a building purpose-built for residence and business by Peter and Ivy Milnes. The Milnes family continued to run the paper until 1986, when it was bought by the Wilson family. Rural Press purchased it later, and eventually Fairfax (SA Regional Media) became the owners.

In May 2017, the newspaper sold its 95-year old office at 13 Coral Street, moving 100m south, into Stuart Street, Victor Harbor. By 2023 it had moved again, to 2 Coral Street.

=== Other publications ===
On the Coast is a monthly publication first begun as a quarterly in December 1989 by Country Publishers. In October 1990, it absorbed The District Telegraph (issued February 1988-July 1990), a publication of the Willunga Council. By 1992 it was a small monthly newspaper published by The Times to serve the Fleurieu Peninsula. It is posted and delivered to Sellicks, Aldinga Beach, McLaren Vale, McLaren Flat, Maslin Beach, Moana, Seaford and Willunga (and available at general stores in Aldinga, Old Noarlunga, Mt. Compass, McLaren Vale, Sellicks, Seaford, Seaford Rise, Maslins Beach, and Willunga Library).

The Times also published the Great Southern Star (21 November 1995 – June 1999), a free local newspaper with content covering the whole of the Fleurieu Peninsula.

== Location and distribution ==
As of 2023 the newspaper continues to be published weekly as The Times and includes a digital edition. Its address is 2 Coral St.

The Times serves towns including Victor Harbor, Port Elliot, Middleton, Goolwa, Strathalbyn, Myponga, Normanville, Yankalilla, and Cape Jervis.

== Awards ==
The Times won the 2007 Best SA Country Newspaper over 6000 circulation award.

== Digitisation ==
The National Library of Australia has digitised photographic copies of most issues of The Victor Harbor Times and Encounter Bay and Lower Murray Pilot from Vol I, No. 1 of 23 August 1912 to Vol. XIX No. 920 of 9 May 1930 and its successor The Victor Harbour Times from Vol XXI, No. 1019 of 15 April 1932 to Vol. 74 No. 3,478 of 31 December 1986. These copies may be accessed via Trove.

On the Coast is available in microfiche and physical formats in the State Library of South Australia.
