= Mount Jagged, South Australia =

Mount Jagged South Australia
- Coordinates: 35°25′15″S 138°37′47″E
- Population: 155 (SAL 2016)
- Established: 1998
- Postcode(s): 5211
- Time zone: ACST (UTC+9:30)
  - Summer (DST): ACST (UTC+10:30)
- Location: 55 km (34 mi) south of Adelaide; 16 km (10 mi) north-west of Goolwa; 15 km (9 mi) north of Victor Harbor
- LGA(s): Alexandrina Council; City of Victor Harbor
- Region: Fleurieu and Kangaroo Island
- County: County of Hindmarsh
- State electorate(s): Finniss
- Federal division(s): Mayo
Mean max temp	Mean min temp	Annual rainfall
20.6 °C; 69 °F	10.3 °C; 51 °F	551.8 mm 21.7 in
Suburbs around Mount Jagged:
Mount Compass	Mount Compass	Tooperang
Mount Compass; Hindmarsh Tiers	Mount Jagged	Mosquito Hill; Middleton
Hindmarsh Valley	Port Elliot; Hindmarsh Valley	Middleton
- Footnotes: Locations; Adjoining localities

Mount Jagged is a locality in the Australian state of South Australia located about 55 kilometres (34 miles) south of the state capital of Adelaide and about 16 kilometres (9.9 miles) north-west and 15 kilometres (9.3 miles) north respectively of the municipal seats of Goolwa and Victor Harbor.

The boundaries were created in August 1998 for the part in the District Council of Victor Harbor and then again in August 2000 for the part in the Alexandrina Council. Its name is derived from Mount Jagged, a hill located within its boundaries.

The Victor Harbor Road passes through the locality. Land use within Mount Jagged is limited to non-broadacre farming and horticulture due to its location within a zone for the protection of groundwater intended to supply the needs of the town of Mount Compass.

Mount Jagged is located within the federal division of Mayo, the state electoral district of Finniss and the local government areas of the Alexandrina Council and the City of Victor Harbor.
