= Wright Island (South Australia) =

Island in South Australia

Wright
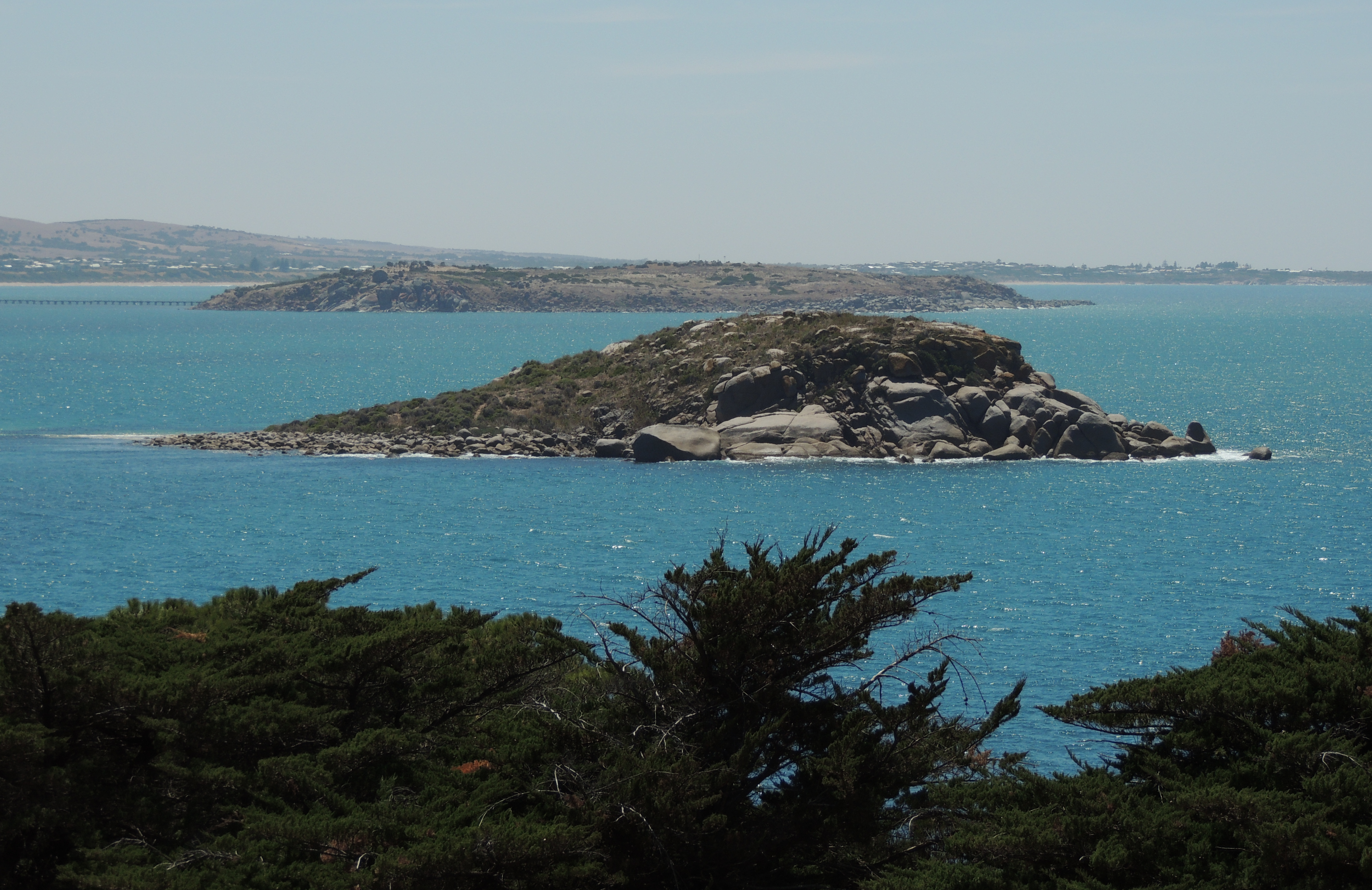
- Wright Island, Encounter Bay, South Australia as seen from The Bluff. Granite Island is immediately behind Wright Island

- Location within South Australia

Geography
- Location: Encounter Bay
- Coordinates: 35.583°S 138.609°E

Administration
- Australia

Wright Island is a 1 hectare (2.5 acres) island in Encounter Bay, South Australia. It is located between the popular tourist destination Granite Island and the prominent rocky headland known as The Bluff. The island consists largely of granite boulders. It also features low vegetation and a sandy beach suitable for the landing of small boats. The island is uninhabited and can only be accessed from the water. It was named after William Wright, one of the headmen of the South Australia Company's whaling operations in the Victor Harbor area in the 1800s. The island is managed by the City of Victor Harbor, the local government authority, as part of its parks and gardens asset.

Eleven-year-old Janet Barker visited the island in 1954 and described it in a letter to Adelaide newspaper, The Mail:

One day a boy rowed us over to Wright Island where we saw lots of baby penguins.Their nests were lined with feathers but we could hardly see them because they were under rocks. On the beach there were two whale bones and there were shags all over the rocks. The boy told us the island was half a mile from Encounter Bay and on still nights he could hear the penguins squawking.

== Wright Island Beach ==
Wright Island Beach (35°34'55.45"S 138°36'29.24"E) is a small beach located on Wright Island. It is commonly used by wildlife and is popular with human visitors in the summer who swim and fish there.

== Little penguin colony ==
"Many" penguins were present on Wright Island in 1941 and breeding in 1954.

In 1973, ten dead penguins and fifteen young seagulls were found dead on Wright Island in Encounter Bay, South Australia. It was believed that they were killed by people poking sticks down burrows before scattering the dead bodies around.

In 1977, Wright Island supported a colony of 300 Little penguins.

In 1990, the wider Encounter Bay population (of which Wright Island is a part) was estimated to be between 5000 and 7000 penguins.

In early December 1991 a general count found 447 penguins present. In 1992, the population was estimated at over 200. At June 2011 its population status was unknown.

In January 2013, Victor Harbor mayor Graham Philp said that the penguin colonies on Wright and West Islands were 'extinct' while the population on Granite Island was in 'the low 20s'.

The 2013 Encounter Bay penguin census conducted by penguin ecologist Diane Colombelli-Négrel from Flinders University found no penguins and no active burrows on Wright Island. The census' report concluded that the colony had not recovered from a prior colony collapse.
