= Spring Mount Conservation Park =

Protected area in South Australia

- IUCN category III (natural monument or feature)
- Location within South Australia
- Location: South Australia
- Nearest city: Victor Harbor
- Coordinates: 35°26′42″S 138°31′40″E
- Area: 2.79 km^{2} (1.08 sq mi)
- Established: 3 February 1966
- Governing body: Department for Environment and Water

Spring Mount Conservation Park, formerly the Spring Mount Wild-Life Reserve, is a protected area in the Australian state of South Australia located in the localities of Hindmarsh Valley and Inman Valley about 57 kilometres (35 mi) south of the state capital of Adelaide.

The conservation park consists of the following land in the cadastral unit of the Hundred of Encounter Bay – Sections 95, 633, 651 and 715, Allotment 100 in Deposited Plan 68900 and Pieces 50 and 51 in Deposited Plan 90949. Sections 633 and 715 first acquired protected area status as a wild-life reserve proclaimed on 3 February 1966 under the National Park and Wild Life Reserves Act 1891-1960. On 27 April 1972, the wild-life reserve was reconstituted as the Spring Mount Conservation Park under the National Parks and Wildlife Act 1972. On 13 September 1973, section 95 was added to the conservation park. On 17 October 2013, land in section 561 and land described as “Allotment 100” and “Pieces 50 and 51” were added. As of 2018, it covered an area of 2.79 square kilometres (1.08 sq mi).

In 1980, the conservation park was described as follows:

Spring Mount Conservation Park. Represents a relatively undisturbed area of mature stringybark forest and the large trees provide a breeding habitat for the spectacular but poorly studied Calyptorhynchus funereus (yellow tailed black cockatoo). Petroica phoenicea (flame robin) which is uncommon in South Australia … and Zoothera dauma (scaly thrush) which is threatened due to destruction of its habitat. Both occur in the park…

Situated in a high rainfall area (1,000mm per annum) Spring Mount Conservation Park consists of an undulating ironstone plateau with one or two small but quite steep valleys. The vegetation is an open forest of Eucalyptus obliqua and E. baxteri with a mid-dense understorey comprising a great variety of sclerophyllous shrubs. Macropus fuliginosus (western grey kangaroo) is common in the park, which has at least five other native mammal species…

This park is relatively undisturbed, although an old quarry is situated in Section 95.

The conservation park is categorised as an IUCN Category III protected area In 1980, it was listed on the now-defunct Register of the National Estate.

== See also ==
- Protected areas of South Australia
