= Goolwa Beach =

- Suburb
- Coordinates: 35.513530°S 138.769750°E
- Country: Australia
- State: South Australia
- Region: Fleurieu and Kangaroo Island
- LGA: Alexandrina Council
- Location: 67 km (42 mi) south of Adelaide city centre; 1.8 km (1.1 mi) south-west of Goolwa
- Established: 1993

Government
  - State electorate: Finniss
  - Federal division: Mayo

Population
  - Total: 2,128 (2016 census)
- Time zone: UTC+9:30 (ACST)
  - Summer (DST): UTC+10:30 (ACST)
- Postcode: 5214
- Mean max temp: 20.8 °C (69.4 °F)
- Mean min temp: 11.8 °C (53.2 °F)
- Annual rainfall: 383.2 mm (15.09 in)
Suburbs around Goolwa Beach
Goolwa	Goolwa	Goolwa
Middleton	Goolwa Beach	Goolwa South
Encounter Bay	Encounter Bay	Encounter Bay
- Coordinates; Locations; Climate; Adjoining localities

Goolwa Beach is both a locality in the Australian state of South Australia located about 67 kilometres (42 miles) south of the Adelaide city centre located on land overlooking Encounter Bay on the southern continental coastline, and the name of the 11 km section of beach that runs from Goolwa Beach to the Murray Mouth.

The name was first used in respect to a private sub-division of land within the cadastral unit of the Hundred of Goolwa. Boundaries were created for the “long established name” in 1993 and were “discontinued and re-established in August 2000.”

The locality is bounded to the north by Port Elliot Road and to the south by the coastline with Encounter Bay. The western side of the locality is zoned for agricultural use while the eastern side is occupied by an urban area which extends into the adjoining localities of Goolwa and Goolwa South. The coastline is zoned for conservation.

Goolwa Beach is located within the federal division of Mayo, the state electoral district of Finniss and the local government area of the Alexandrina Council.

The eastern end of Goolwa Beach has parking, public toilets, a kiosk, and is the site for the Goolwa Surf Life Saving Club which was officially opened in October 2019. Immediately behind the Goolwa Surf Life Saving Club is a four-wheel drive vehicle access track to Goolwa Beach and the Murray river mouth. Public vehicles are not permitted on the beach to the west of the access track.

The beach is composed of fine sand with waves averaging 2 metres (6.6 ft), and is considered one of the most hazardous beaches of South Australia due to persistent high waves, strong currents and the regular formation of rips. A small section of Goolwa Beach near the Goolwa Surf Life Saving Club is patrolled Saturdays, Sundays and public holidays at a minimum during the summer season beginning early October and finishing April.
