= Alexandrina Council =

- Local government area
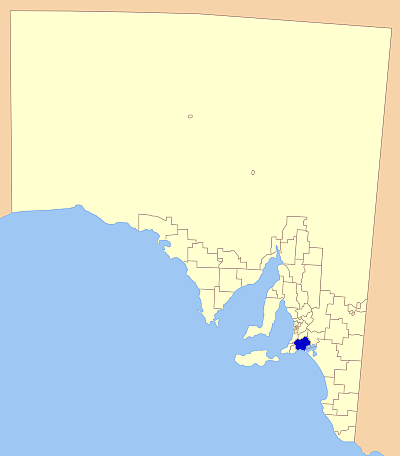
- Location of Alexandrina Council in Australia

- Interactive map of Alexandrina Council
- Coordinates: 35.3857°S 138.8232°E
- Country: Australia
- State: South Australia
- Region: Fleurieu and Kangaroo Island
- Established: 1997
- Council seat: Goolwa

Government
  - Mayor: Keith Parkes
  - State electorate: Finniss, Hammond
  - Federal division: Barker, Mayo

Area
  - Total: 1,827 km^{2} (705 sq mi)

Population
  - Total: 28,730 (LGA 2021)
  - Density: 15.73/km^{2} (40.7/sq mi)
- Website: Alexandrina Council
LGAs around Alexandrina Council
City of Onkaparinga	District Council of Mount Barker	Rural City of Murray Bridge
District Council of Yankalilla	Alexandrina Council	Rural City of Murray Bridge
City of Victor Harbor		The Coorong District Council

Alexandrina Council is a local government area in the Fleurieu and Kangaroo Island region of South Australia. The Alexandrina Council was formed on 1 July 1997 by the amalgamation of the District Council of Port Elliot and Goolwa, the District Council of Strathalbyn and a portion of the District Council of Willunga. The council is divided into five wards: Nangkita Kuitpo, Angas Bremer, Port Elliot Middleton, Strathalbyn and Goolwa Hindmarsh Island.

The district relies on a diverse range of industries including agriculture, fishing, forestry, viticulture and tourism to supply its economy. Many of the towns encompassed in the council are popular tourist towns not far from Adelaide.

== Economy ==
The economy of the Alexandrina Council is very diverse, which may be attributed to the great diversity of landscapes within its boundaries, allowing for diverse rural, fishing and tourism industries to occur. The largest part of the economy comes from agriculture, with a wide variety of farming practices including dairy, beef and sheep farming, with areas around Goolwa and Mount Compass prominent in the dairy industry. A number of crops including cereals, as well as lucerne are planted in the district. Langhorne Creek and Currency Creek are well known for their viticulture, producing high quality Sauvignon blanc, Cabernet Sauvignon, Merlot, Shiraz and Chardonnay. In the Kuitpo region, forestry is prominent, with large tracts of pine present.

The district borders two bodies of water, Encounter Bay and Lake Alexandrina, which are commercially exploited for a variety of fish and crustaceans. The coast produce shark, mulloway and Australian salmon, as well as huge numbers of Goolwa cockles which are exported all over South Australia. Commercial fishing above the locks has become highly regulated to conserve native fish species but golden perch and Murray cod are still caught, and a number of operators have found markets for the invasive European carp.

The area also has a significant tourism industry, particularly based around the Murray River at Goolwa and the beaches of Port Elliot and Middleton. The SteamRanger Cockle Train operates from Goolwa and stops at Port Elliot on the way to Victor Harbor.

== Demographics ==
In the 2021 census, there were 28,730 people who were usually resident in Alexandrina Council's bounds: 48.8% were males and 51.2% were females. Of the total population, 1.6% were Indigenous persons.

It was found that 14.2% of the population usually resident in Alexandrina Council were aged between 0–14 years, and 48.3% were persons aged 55 years and over. The median age of persons was 53 years, compared with 38 years for persons in Australia.

In the 2021 census, 78.1% of people stated they were born in Australia, with lower numbers immigrating from a number of countries, with the most prominent being: England 9.1%, New Zealand 0.9%, Scotland 0.8%, Netherlands 0.7%, and Germany 0.7%.

The most common responses for religious affiliation for persons usually resident were: No Religion 51.7%, Anglican 9.9%, Catholic 8.5%, and Uniting Church 7.6%.

== Localities ==
The main towns and localities within the council are:

- Ashbourne
- Clayton Bay
- Currency Creek
- Goolwa
  - Goolwa Beach
  - Goolwa North
  - Goolwa South
- Chiton
- Hindmarsh Island
- Langhorne Creek
- Macclesfield (part)
- Middleton
- Milang
- Mount Compass
- Port Elliot
- Strathalbyn

Smaller towns and localities covered by the council are:

Angas Plains, Belvidere, Blackfellows Creek, Bletchley, Bull Creek, Dingabledinga, Finniss, Gemmells, Hartley, Highland Valley, Hope Forest, Kuitpo, Kuitpo Colony, Kyeema, Lake Plains, McHarg Creek, Montarra, Mosquito Hill, Mount Jagged, Mount Magnificent, Mount Observation, Mundoo Island, Nangkita, Nurragi, Pages Flat, Paris Creek, Point Sturt, Prospect Hill, Red Creek, Salem, Sandergrove, The Range, Tolderol (part), Tooperang, Willunga Hill, Willyaroo, Woodchester, Yundi.

== Councillors ==
Alexandrina Council has a directly elected mayor.

Ward	Councillor	Notes
Mayor	Keith Parkes	
Nangkita Kuitpo	Bill Coomans	
Angas Bremer	Karyn Bradford	
Angas Bremer	Michael Farrier	
Port Elliot Middleton	Michael Scott ASM OAM	
Port Elliot Middleton	Bronwyn Lewis	
Strathalbyn	Rex Keily AM	
Strathalbyn	Craig Maidment	
Goolwa Hindmarsh Island	John Carter	
Goolwa Hindmarsh Island	Margaret Gardner	
Goolwa Hindmarsh Island	James Stewart	
Goolwa Hindmarsh Island	Melissa Rebbeck	

== Statistics ==
Statistics from Annual Reports

Report	Report size (pg)	Area (ha)	Pop. (est.)	Assess -ments	Voters	Council size	Sealed roads (km)	Unsealed roads (km)	Total roads (km)	Staff F.T.	Staff P.T.	Staff Other	Staff Total	Notes
1998/99	23	167,711	16,000	13,000	14,075	10	361	989	1350					
1999/00	35	167,711	17,300	14,132	18,668	10	424	951	1375	88	8		96	
2000/01	40	167,711	17,535	14,132	18,668	10	424	1000	1424	102		14	116	
2001/02	80	167,711	18,500	14,132	18,688	10	424	951	1375	96	13	19	128	
2002/03	82	167,711	20,318	15,345	20,320	11	482	865	1347	100	18	24	142	
2003/04	107	167,711	21,000	15,675	20,866	11	491	876	1367	107	15	26	148	
2004/05	108	180,000	22,000	16,264	22,127	11	502	866	1368	113	21	22	156	
2005/06	107	180,000	22,000	17,482	22,127	11	502	866	1368	112	27	20	159	
2006/07	105	180,000	20,715	16,671	22,127	11	518	846	1364	109	24	33	166	
2007/08	119	180,000	22,026	17,638	22,127	11	534	820	1354	110	17	56	183	
2008/09	132	180,000	22,350	17,702	24,338	11	528	800	1328	138	29	34	201	
2009/10	131	180,000	23,160	17,702	24,111	11	528	800	1328	118	24	48	190	

== See also ==
- List of parks and gardens in rural South Australia
- District Council of Alexandrina
