= Seal Island (Encounter Bay) =

Small island of South Australia

- Location within South Australia

Geography
- Location: Encounter Bay
- Coordinates: 35°34′42″S 138°38′35″E
- Area: 1 ha (2.5 acres)
- Highest elevation: 12 m (39 ft)

Administration
- Australia

Demographics
- Population: 0

Seal Island, also known as Seal Rock, is an island in the Australian state of South Australia located in Encounter Bay off the south coast of Fleurieu Peninsula approximately 2.7 kilometres (1.7 miles) south-east of Victor Harbor. It is located with the boundaries of the following protected areas - the West Island Conservation Park and the Encounter Marine Park.

== Description ==
Seal Island is located about 2.7 kilometres (1.7 miles) south-east of Victor Harbor and 3.7 kilometres (2.3 miles) east-north east of Rosetta Head (also known as The Bluff). The island is described as being "a 1 hectare (2.5 acres) mound of tumbled granite bounders scoured of soil" that "reaches 12 m (39 ft) above sea level". The island is also known as Seal Rock.

== Flora and fauna ==
As of 1996, Seal Island was observed as having no vegetation while the only vertebrate animals observed was a breeding colony of silver gulls.

== History ==
The island's name is reported as suggesting the presence of an Australian sea lion or a New Zealand fur-seal colony on the island during the early 19th century.

== Protected areas status ==
Since 7 June 1979, Seal Island has been located with the boundaries of the West Island Conservation Park. Since 2012, the waters surrounding its shores are located within the boundaries of the Encounter Marine Park.
