= Pullen Island =

Pullen Island may refer to:

- Pullen Island (Antarctica)
- Pullen Island (Canada), named by William Pullen
- Pullen Island (South Australia), also named by William Pullen
