= Mundoo Island, South Australia =

Mundoo Island South Australia
- Coordinates: 35°32′53″S 138°55′57″E
- Population: 0 (SAL 2021)
- Established: 31 August 2000
- Postcode(s): 5214
- Time zone: ACST (UTC+9:30)
  - Summer (DST): ACST (UTC+10:30)
- Location: 76 km (47 mi) SE of Adelaide; 15 km (9 mi) E of Goolwa
- LGA(s): Alexandrina Council
- Region: Fleurieu and Kangaroo Island
- County: Hindmarsh
- State electorate(s): Finniss
- Federal division(s): Mayo
Mean max temp	Mean min temp	Annual rainfall
20.8 °C; 69 °F	11.8 °C; 53 °F	394.8 mm 15.5 in
Suburbs around Mundoo Island:
Hindmarsh Island	Hindmarsh Island; Point Sturt	Point Sturt; Lake Alexandrina
Hindmarsh Island	Mundoo Island	Lake Alexandrina; Coorong
Coorong	Coorong	Coorong
- Footnotes: Location; Adjoining localities

Mundoo Island is a locality in the Australian state of South Australia located on Mundoo Island and some adjoining water at the southern end of Lake Alexandrina about 87 kilometres (54 mi) south-east of the state capital of Adelaide.

Its boundaries were created on 31 August 2000 for the "long established name", which is derived from the island and ultimately from an Aboriginal word mundo, which means "mud" or "filth". In 2014, a portion of land was excluded from the locality and "added to Hindmarsh Island to ensure the whole of Hindmarsh Island is within the rural locality of Hindmarsh Island”.

The locality consists of Mundoo Island and a portion of the following waterways adjoining the island: the channel known as the Lower Murray (or the Goolwa) in the north; Boundary Creek to the east and the south-east; the Coorong Channel in the south; the Mundoo Channel in the south-west; and Holmes Creek to the west and the north-west.

The land within the locality is occupied by the privately owned Mundoo Island Station which has been operation since 1843. Access to the locality from the mainland is a road that crosses from Goolwa to the Hindmarsh Island via the Hindmarsh Island Bridge and then onto Mundoo Island via the Mundoo Barrage.

While the sole land use zoning within the locality is conservation, the land has been used for grazing since 1843, and the Government of South Australia recognises that "farming activities are the predominant uses in the zone and will continue".

Mundoo Island is located within the federal division of Mayo, the state electoral district of Finniss, and the local government area of the Alexandrina Council.
