= Hindmarsh Valley, South Australia =

Hindmarsh Valley
- Suburb
- Coordinates: 35°28′36″S 138°36′01″E
- Country: Australia
- State: South Australia
- Region: Fleurieu and Kangaroo Island
- LGA: City of Victor Harbor
- Location: 64 km (40 mi) south of Adelaide; 9 km (5.6 mi) north of Victor Harbor
- Established: 6 August 1998

Government
  - State electorate: Finniss
  - Federal division: Mayo

Population
  - Total: 476 (2016 census)
- Time zone: UTC+9:30 (ACST)
  - Summer (DST): UTC+10:30 (ACST)
- Postcode: 5211
- County: Hindmarsh
- Mean max temp: 20.6 °C (69.1 °F)
- Mean min temp: 10.3 °C (50.5 °F)
- Annual rainfall: 547.9 mm (21.57 in)
Suburbs around Hindmarsh Valley
Hindmarsh Tiers	Hindmarsh Tiers; Mount Jagged	Mount Jagged
Inman Valley; Lower Inman Valley	Hindmarsh Valley	Mount Jagged; Port Elliot
Lower Inman Valley; Victor Harbor	Victor Harbor; McCracken; Hayborough; Chiton	Chiton
- Locations; Adjoining localities

Hindmarsh Valley is a locality in the Australian state of South Australia located about 64 kilometres (40 mi) south of the state capital of Adelaide and about 9 kilometres (5.6 mi) north of the municipal seat in Victor Harbor.

== Geography ==
It consists of land on the south-east side of the Mount Lofty Ranges that extends from the foothills towards the coastline and which is mostly located within the catchment of the Hindmarsh River. The Victor Harbor Road passes through the locality on its eastern side while the Hindmarsh Tiers Road passes throughout its centre.

== History ==
Boundaries for the locality were created in August 1998 for the "long established name" which refers the area associated with the catchment of the Hindmarsh River. The name Hindmarsh Valley was also used during 1959 for a private sub-division of a site located within the boundaries of the locality.

== Current situation ==
Land use within Hindmarsh Valley is mainly agricultural with some land at its southern end zoned in part for both commercial use and for current and future residential use as part of the Victor Harbor urban area. Some of the land at its northern boundary is located within a watershed protection zone where land use is limited to "farming activities on large land holdings that do not pollute water resources". This part of the locality includes the Hindmarsh Valley Reservoir and the Hindmarsh Falls, a waterfall on the Hindmarsh River. The locality also includes two protected areas – the Mount Billy Conservation Park in its north and part of the Spring Mount Conservation Park in its west, and a heritage listed site - the Cut Hill Stone Wall & Memorial Plaque located in its east on the Victor Harbor Road.

The 2016 Australian census which was conducted in August 2016 reports that Hindmarsh Valley had 476 people living within its boundaries.

Hindmarsh Valley is located within the federal division of Mayo, the state electoral district of Finniss and the local government area of the City of Victor Harbor.
