= McCracken, South Australia =

McCracken
- Suburb
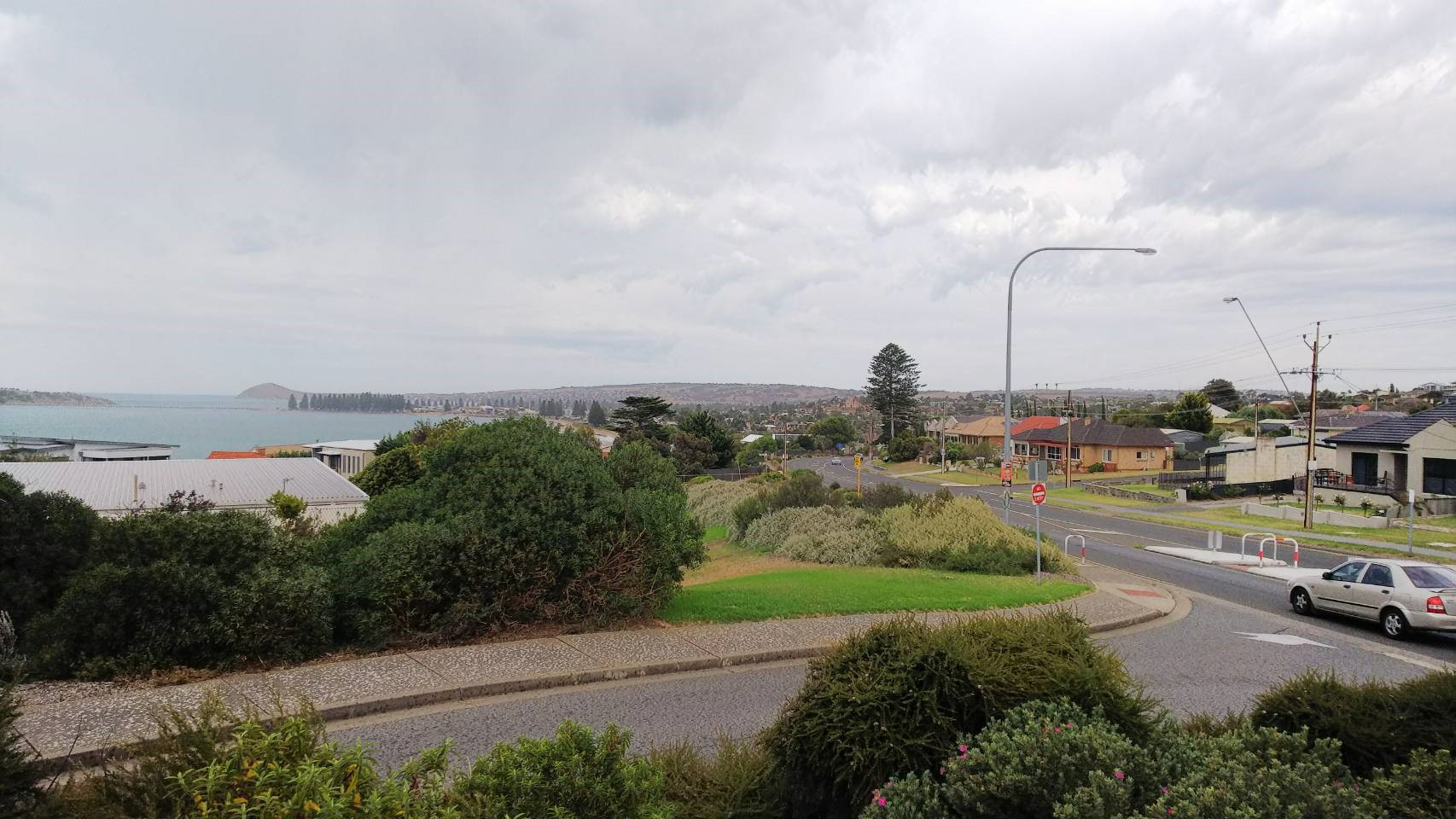
- Kleinigs Hill Lookout, McCracken

- Coordinates: 35°32′08″S 138°37′53″E
- Country: Australia
- State: South Australia
- Region: Fleurieu and Kangaroo Island
- City: Victor Harbor
- LGA: City of Victor Harbor
- Location: 68 km (42 mi) S of Adelaide

Government
  - State electorate: Finniss
  - Federal division: Mayo

Population
  - Total: 1,958 (2016 census)
- Postcode: 5211
Suburbs around McCracken
Hindmarsh Valley	Hindmarsh Valley	Hayborough
Victor Harbor	McCracken	Hayborough
Victor Harbor		Encounter Bay

McCracken is a locality in the Australian state of South Australia located about 68 kilometres (42 mi) south of the state capital of Adelaide in the local government area of the City of Victor Harbor.

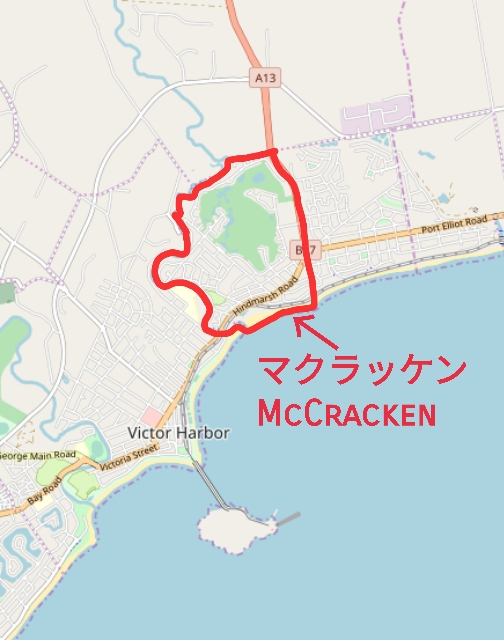
The location of McCracken

== Demographics ==
The 2006 census by the Australian Bureau of Statistics counted 1,549 persons in McCracken on census night. Of these, 47.3% were male and 52.7% were female.

The majority of residents (77%) are of Australian birth, with an additional 13.2% declaring England as their country of birth.

The average age of McCracken residents is higher than the greater Australian population. 79.1% of residents were over 25 years in 2006, compared to the Australian average of 66.5%; and 20.9% were younger than 25 years, compared to the Australian average of 33.5%.

== Community ==
The local newspapers are the Independent Weekly and the Times.

== Amenities ==
McCracken is the location of the McCracken Country Club & Resort.

Cootamundra Reserve lies on the northeast boundary of the suburb.

== Transportation ==
McCracken is serviced by Hindmarsh Road, linking the suburb to Victor Harbor. Victor Harbor Road forms the eastern boundary of McCracken.
