= Goolwa North =

- Suburb
- Coordinates: 35.492940°S 138.8077°E
- Country: Australia
- State: South Australia
- Region: Fleurieu and Kangaroo Island
- LGA: Alexandrina Council
- Location: 66 km (41 mi) south of Adelaide city centre; 2.5 km (1.6 mi) north-east of Goolwa
- Established: 1993

Government
  - State electorate: Finniss
  - Federal division: Mayo

Population
  - Total: 1,016 (2016 census)
- Time zone: UTC+9:30 (ACST)
  - Summer (DST): UTC+10:30 (ACST)
- Postcode: 5214
- Mean max temp: 20.8 °C (69.4 °F)
- Mean min temp: 11.8 °C (53.2 °F)
- Annual rainfall: 383.2 mm (15.09 in)
Suburbs around Goolwa North
Currency Creek	Currency Creek	Currency Creek
Goolwa	Goolwa North	Currency Creek
Goolwa	Hindmarsh Island	Hindmarsh Island
- Coordinates; Locations; Climate; Adjoining localities

Goolwa North is a locality in the Australian state of South Australia located about 66 kilometres (41 miles) south of the state capital of Adelaide and 2.5 kilometres (1.6 miles) northeast of the centre of the municipal seat of Goolwa overlooking the following water bodies in the Murray River system - Currency Creek to the north and the channel known as Goolwa or the Lower Murray to the south-east.

The name was first used in respect to a private sub-division of land within the cadastral unit of the Hundred of Goolwa. Boundaries were created for the “long established name” in September 1993 and were “discontinued and re-established in August 2000.” The revised boundaries include the Goolwa Shack Site.

The majority land use within the locality is residential which consists of an urban area on the southern side which extends from the adjoining locality of Goolwa to the south west and land on the northern side zoned for development consisting of “large allotments, detached dwellings and rural activities”. The locality’s extent includes part of both Currency Creek and the Lower Murray because its boundary is located at the midpoint of the channel for these watercourses. These parts of the locality are zoned for conservation because of their location within the Coorong and Lakes Alexandrina and Albert Wetland which is listed both as a Ramsar site and wetland of national importance.

Goolwa North is located within the federal division of Mayo, the state electoral district of Finniss and the local government area of the Alexandrina Council.
