= Hindmarsh Tiers, South Australia =

Hindmarsh Tiers South Australia
- Coordinates: 35°25′26″S 138°34′12″E
- Population: 91 (2016 census)
- Established: 6 August 1998
- Postcode(s): 5202
- Time zone: ACST (UTC+9:30)
  - Summer (DST): ACST (UTC+10:30)
- Location: 55 km (34 mi) south of Adelaide; 15 km (9 mi) north of Victor Harbor
- LGA(s): City of Victor Harbor
- Region: Fleurieu and Kangaroo Island
- County: Hindmarsh
- State electorate(s): Finniss
- Federal division(s): Mayo
Mean max temp	Mean min temp	Annual rainfall
19.4 °C; 67 °F	7.5 °C; 46 °F	756.3 mm 29.8 in
Suburbs around Hindmarsh Tiers:
Myponga	Myponga; Mount Compass; Mount Jagged	Mount Jagged
Myponga	Hindmarsh Tiers	Mount Jagged
Inman Valley	Inman Valley; Hindmarsh Valley	Hindmarsh Valley
- Footnotes: Locations; Adjoining localities

Hindmarsh Tiers (also known as The Tiers) is a locality in the Australian state of South Australia located about 55 kilometres (34 mi) south of the state capital of Adelaide and about 15 kilometres (9.3 mi) north of the municipal seat of Victor Harbor.

Boundaries for the locality were created in August 1998 for the “long established name.” A school operated from 1920 to 1938 within what is now the locality.

Hindmarsh Tiers Road which is maintained by the state government passes through the locality in an east-west alignment with the road forming part of its southern boundary.

Land use within Hindmarsh Tiers is limited to “farming activities on large land holdings that do not pollute water resources” due to its location within a watershed protection zone. The protected area known as the Gum Tree Gully Conservation Park is located in the western side of the locality.

The 2016 Australian census which was conducted in August 2016 reports that Hindmarsh Tiers had 91 people living within its boundaries.

Hindmarsh Tiers is located within the federal division of Mayo, the state electoral district of Finniss and the local government area of the City of Victor Harbor.
