= City of Victor Harbor =

Coordinates: 35°33′S 138°37′E

- Local government area
- Interactive map of City of Victor Harbor
- Country: Australia
- State: South Australia
- Region: Fleurieu and Kangaroo Island
- Established: 1975 (council formed); 2000 (municipality)
- Council seat: Victor Harbor

Government
  - Mayor: Moira Jenkins
  - State electorate: Finniss
  - Federal division: Mayo

Area
  - Total: 386.5 km^{2} (149.2 sq mi)

Population
  - Total: 16,139 (LGA 2021)
  - Density: 41.76/km^{2} (108.2/sq mi)
- Website: City of Victor Harbor
LGAs around City of Victor Harbor
Yankalilla	Alexandrina	Alexandrina
Yankalilla	City of Victor Harbor	Alexandrina
Yankalilla

The City of Victor Harbor (formerly the District Council of Victor Harbor) is a local government area of South Australia. It covers an area of 386.5 square kilometres (149.2 sq mi) along the coast, about 80 kilometres (50 mi) south of Adelaide, the capital of South Australia. The council is responsible for the city of Victor Harbor (formerly a township from 1863–2000), which contains over 85% of its population, and the surrounding rural area to the north and west. The City of Victor Harbor had an estimated population of over 14,000 at the 2016 Census.

== History ==
The City, then known as the District Council of Victor Harbor, was the product of a merger on 31 October 1975 between the District Council of Encounter Bay and the Corporation of Victor Harbor.

In 1996–1997, a merger with the small neighbouring councils in Port Elliot and Goolwa, (which, with the town of Middleton, form a contiguous coastal conurbation with Victor Harbor), was considered, but ultimately the District Council of Victor Harbor remained distinct, and the other councils merged on 1 July 1997 to form the Alexandrina Council.

On 1 February 2000, the District Council of Victor Harbor was renamed as the City of Victor Harbor; coinciding with the proclamation of the broader township as South Australia's eighth official city.

== Council ==
The City has 10 councillors and no wards. Each councillor serves a four-year term; the last election was in November 2022.

The 2022 elected council consists of:

Ward	Party	Councillor	Notes
Mayor	Independent	Dr Moira Jenkins	
Unsubdivided	Independent	Stewart Burns	
Unsubdivided	Independent	Michael Quinton	
Unsubdivided	Australian Greens SA	Marylin Henderson	
Unsubdivided	Independent	Angela Schiller	Deputy Mayor and South Australia's first blind Council Member
Unsubdivided	One Nation	Carlos Quaremba	President of One Nation SA
Unsubdivided	Independent	Nick McKenzie	
Unsubdivided	Independent	Brayden Mann	
Unsubdivided	Independent	David Kemp	
Unsubdivided	Liberal	Carol Schofield	

The 2018 elected council consisted of:

Ward	Party	Councillor	Notes
Mayor	Independent	Moira Jenkins	Re-elected in 2022
Unsubdivided	Independent	Brayden Mann	Re-elected in 2022
Unsubdivided	Independent	Nicholas Hayles	
Unsubdivided	Independent	Marylin Henderson	Re-elected in 2022
Unsubdivided	Independent	Andrew Robertson	
Unsubdivided	Independent	Tim Glazbrook	
Unsubdivided	Independent	Peter Charles	
Unsubdivided	Independent	Bryan Littlely	
Unsubdivided	Independent	David Kemp	Re-elected in 2022
Unsubdivided	Liberal	Carol Schofield	Re-elected in 2022

== Localities ==
The city consists of the following localities (also called suburbs):

- Back Valley
- Encounter Bay
- Hayborough
- Hindmarsh Tiers
- Hindmarsh Valley
- Inman Valley
- Lower Inman Valley
- Mount Jagged
- McCracken
- Victor Harbor
- Waitpinga

== See also ==
- List of parks and gardens in rural South Australia
