= Gum Tree Gully Conservation Park =

Protected area in South Australia

- IUCN category III (natural monument or feature)
- Location within South Australia
- Location: South Australia, Hindmarsh Tiers
- Nearest city: Myponga
- Coordinates: 35°25′20″S 138°31′03″E
- Area: 1.11 km^{2} (0.43 sq mi)
- Established: 18 February 2010
- Governing body: Department for Environment and Water

Gum Tree Gully Conservation Park is a protected area in the Australian state of South Australia located in the locality of Hindmarsh Tiers about 55 kilometres (34 mi) south of the state capital of Adelaide and about 6 kilometres (3.7 mi) south-east of Myponga.

The conservation park consists of the following land in the cadastral unit of the Hundred of Encounter Bay – Allotment 31 of Deposited Plan 79974. The name was approved by the Surveyor General of South Australia on 18 August 2009 and is derived from a gully called Gum Tree Gully whose extent includes the conservation park. As of 2018, it covered an area of 1.11 square kilometres (0.43 sq mi).

Gum Tree Gully Conservation Park is reported as being one of the “new reserves” created as a “direct initiative” of the recovery plan for the Mount Lofty Ranges southern emu-wren (Stipiturus malachurus intermedius) which is a bird species listed as endangered under the Environment Protection and Biodiversity Conservation Act 1999.

The conservation park is categorised as an IUCN Category III protected area

== See also ==
- Protected areas of South Australia
