= Greenhills Adventure Park =

Former theme park in Victor Harbor, Australia

- Interactive map of Greenhills Adventure Park
- Location: Victor Harbor, South Australia, Australia
- Coordinates: 35.528371°S 138.624082°E
- Opened: 1982
- Closed: 1 May 2016

Attractions
- Total: Go-karts, rock-climbing, mini-golf, tennis, maze, dry slide, flying fox, adventure playground
- Water rides: Water slides, canoes, paddle boats, aquabikes

Greenhills Adventure Park was a theme park located near Victor Harbor, South Australia. It was established in 1982, and officially opened in March 1983 by Gavin Keneally, South Australia Minister for Tourism.

It closed on 1 May 2016, after the land was sold to property developers.

== History ==
=== Origin ===
Greenhills Adventure Park was founded by Margaret and Bill McKenzie, with Rosemary and Tom Builder, in 1982, and opened in 1983. It was a ten-hectare (about 25 acre) plot of land with over 20 attractions. To assist in maintain the park during its peak season, Meg Whibley was hired as Managing Director, along with three full time staff and 30 seasonal staff.

=== Closure ===
In 2009, Margaret and Bill McKenzie sold the land to land developers Daniel McOmish and Dean Kyros, who wished to build 66 property allotments over the course of a four-stage development plan. The park continued to remain operational, as property, such as the overflow parking, was planned to be built on.

In mid-2015, it was announced that the park would close on 1 May 2016 due to interest in the first stages of development as well as increases in electricity and water bills. The park sold discounted tickets to commemorate their last season,

On 25 June 2016 the park hosted an auction, selling much of its equipment.

== Attractions ==
Attractions at Greenhills Adventure Park included:

Attraction	Description
Tractor-drawn train	A tractor-drawn train pulled customers around the park. The total ride time was approximately 15–20 minutes.
Dry slide	The park had a 50-meter dry slide, the largest dry slide on the Fleurieu Peninsula.
Half court tennis	The park had a half court tennis field, with rackets and balls supplied from their kiosk.
Mazes	A wooden maze was located in the park.
Archery	The park had an archery range, with bows and arrows supplied.
Canoes	Canoes were supplied for guests to canoe down the Hindmarsh River. The guests were able to paddle to the ocean, which would take around three hours.
Par 3 golf	A nine-hole golfing course, with fairways ranging from 60 to 90 meters in length, was available. It was par 3 golf. Balls and clubs were supplied.
Aqua bikes	The park had aqua bikes which could be ridden along a lake. Visible on the lake were the River Red Gums.

Patrons could pay additionally to their entry for the following activities:

Attraction	Cost (at 2014)
Petrol go-karts	$5 for 5 minutes
4 wheel motor bikes	$5 for 5 minutes
Mini electric-powered cars	$2.50 for 5 minutes
12 metre climbing wall	$5 per climb
