= Pullen Island Conservation Park =

Protected area in South Australia

- IUCN category Ia (strict nature reserve)
- Location within South Australia
- Location: South Australia
- Nearest city: Port Elliot
- Coordinates: 35°32′16.96″S 138°41′29.13″E
- Area: 2 ha (4.9 acres)
- Established: 16 March 1967
- Visitors: level unknown (in 1983)
- Governing body: Department for Environment and Water

Pullen Island Conservation Park is a protected area that includes all of Pullen Island about 0.5 kilometres (0.31 miles) south of Port Elliot in South Australia and about 94 kilometres (58 miles) south of Adelaide.

The park was proclaimed in 1972 under the National Parks and Wildlife Act 1972, replacing earlier protected area status as a Fauna Conservation Reserve which was proclaimed in 1967. The protected area status exists to protect the island as a breeding area for sea birds such as little penguins and silver gulls.

The conservation park is classified as an IUCN Category IA protected area. In 1980, it was included on the now-defunct Register of the National Estate.

== Climate ==
Pullen Island Conservation Park has a moderate climate with an average temperature of 15 °C and an average rainfall of 766 millimeters per year. The warmest and driest month is December (22 °C with 22 millimetres of rainfall). The wettest and coldest month is June (8 °C with an average rainfall of 142 millimetres).
