= Pullen Island (South Australia) =

Island in South Australia

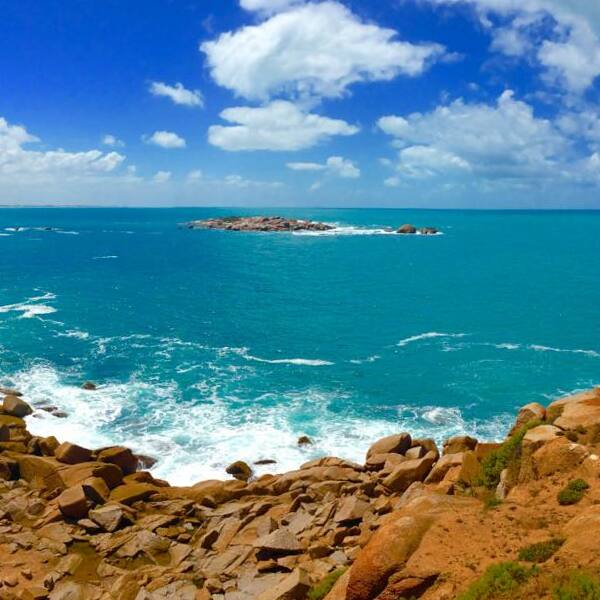
- View from the coast of Horseshoe Bay

- Location within South Australia

Geography
- Coordinates: 35°32′22″S 138°41′24″E
- Adjacent to: Encounter Bay

Administration
- Australia

Pullen Island is a 1 ha granite island lying 0.5 km offshore from the town of Port Elliot on the southern coast of the Fleurieu Peninsula of South Australia. It was originally named Lipson Island but was renamed in 1839 by W.J.S. Pullen, the Colonial Marine Surveyor, after himself. The island is protected by designation as the Pullen Island Conservation Park.

== Description ==
About 300 m long, the island that is largely a mass of weathered granite boulders, with a cove and beach on the northern side providing a landing for small boats. There is little vegetation, though pockets of soil on the higher part of the island support a few plants including the native common boobialla and introduced African boxthorn, tree mallow and buckthorn. Seabirds breeding on the island include little penguins and silver gulls. There is also a large roost of feral pigeons.

=== Little penguin colony ===
The 2013 Encounter Bay penguin census conducted by penguin ecologist Dr. Diane Colombelli-Négrel from Flinders University found no penguins and no active burrows on Pullen Island. The census' report concluded that the colony had not recovered from a prior collapse.

== Protected area status ==
Pullen Island has enjoyed protected area status since 2 September 1948 when it was declared as a closed area for birds under the Animals and Birds Protection Act 1919-1946. On 16 March 1967, the island gained status as a Fauna Conservation Reserve. In 1972, the reserve was re-dedicated as the Pullen Island Conservation Park following the enactment of the National Parks and Wildlife Act 1972.
