= District Council of Alexandrina =

Former local government area of South Australia

Seat of the former District Council of Alexandrina in South Australia

The District Council of Alexandrina was a local government area in rural South Australia from 1856 to 1888.

Based at Point Sturt on the western shore of Lake Alexandrina, it was formed in 1856 by secession from the District Council of Bremer when residents of the Hundred of Alexandrina area lobbied strongly for their own council. 32 years later in 1888 it was amalgamated back into the DC of Bremer.

== Modern namesake ==
The name "Alexandrina" was revived for local government in South Australia in 1997 when the district councils of Strathalbyn, Port Elliot and Goolwa, and part of the District Council of Willunga were amalgamated to form the Alexandrina Council.
