= Middleton, South Australia =

Middleton
- Town
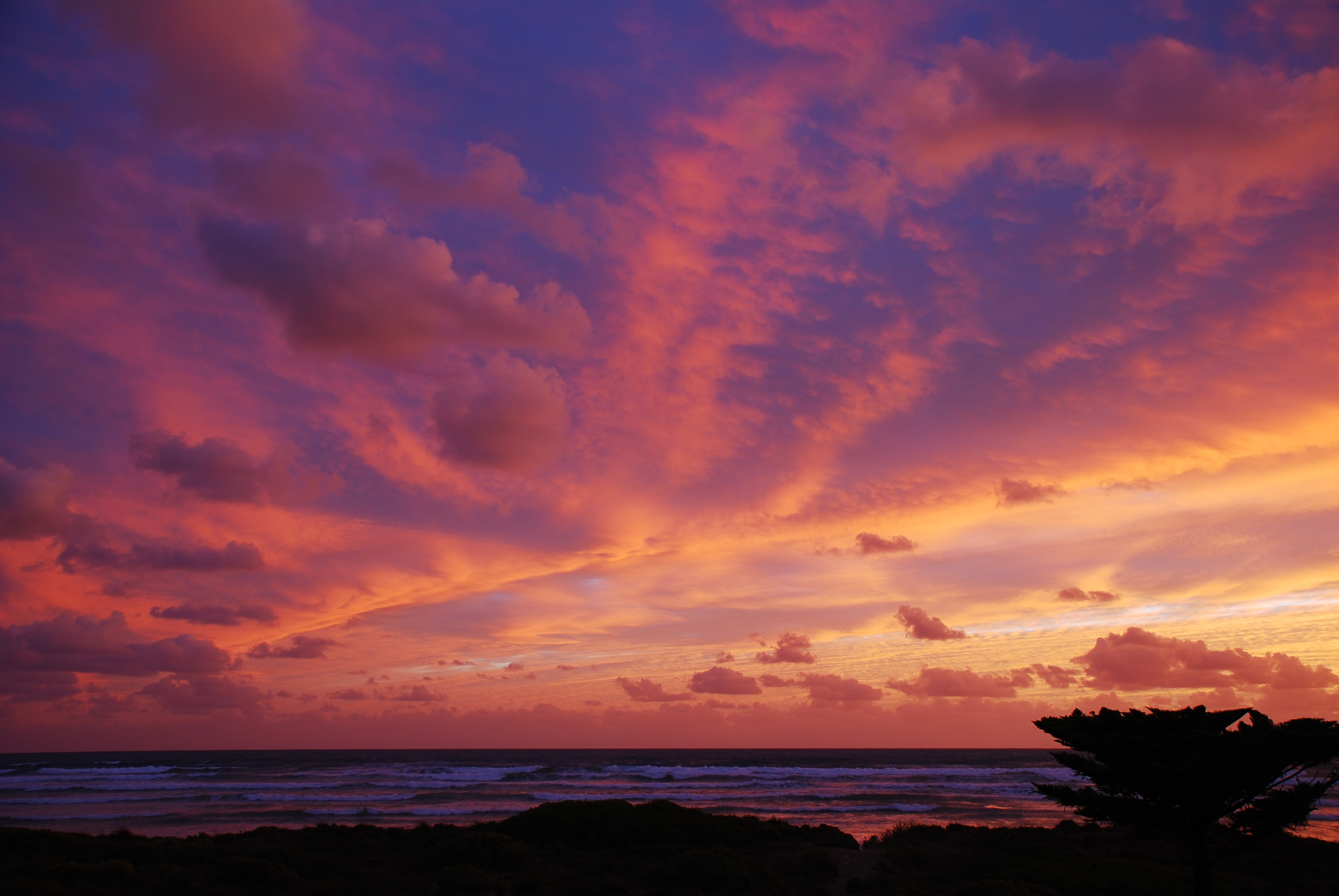
- Middleton sunset

- Coordinates: 35°30′38″S 138°42′23″E
- Country: Australia
- State: South Australia
- Region: Fleurieu and Kangaroo Island
- LGA: Alexandrina Council
- Location: 66 km (41 mi) S of Adelaide; 7 km (4.3 mi) W of Goolwa

Government
  - State electorate: Finniss
  - Federal division: Mayo

Population
  - Total: 1,156 (2016 census)
- Time zone: UTC+9:30 (ACST)
  - Summer (DST): UTC+10:30 (ACDT)
- Postcode: 5213
- County: County of Australia
- Mean max temp: 20.9 °C (69.6 °F)
- Mean min temp: 11.9 °C (53.4 °F)
- Annual rainfall: 386.3 mm (15.21 in)
Localities around Middleton
Mount Jagged	Currency Creek	Currency Creek
Mount Jagged; Port Elliot	Middleton	Goolwa; Goolwa Beach
Port Elliot	Encounter Bay	Encounter Bay
- Locations; Adjoining localities

Middleton is a town in South Australia on the eastern end of the south coast of the Fleurieu Peninsula. It lies between the towns of Port Elliot and Goolwa.

Middleton is a holiday and tourist destination with a popular surf beach. Some southern right whales calve and mate in the waters off Middleton's beaches and can be viewed from Middleton Point or Bashams Beach during the whale watching season (June or July to October). Australian sea lions can be seen resting on beaches.

Middleton has many holiday homes and a caravan park. It also has two doctors' surgeries, a pharmacy, a surf school, general store, hotel, bakery, hairdresser, antique shop, manufacturing jeweller, beautician and a restaurant. It has two playgrounds, tennis courts and an art and craft centre.

The land on which the original homes of Middleton stand was purchased by Lt Col Thomas Higgins in 1849 who named the town after a Middleton in Ireland. The original inhabitants of the area were the Ngarrindjeri people and at least three burial sites are said to be situated around the town, one of which has been built over by a commercial entity.

The 2016 Australian census, carried out in August 2016, reported the population of Middleton as 1,156.

Middleton is located within the federal division of Mayo, the state electoral district of Finniss and the local government area of the Alexandrina Council.
