= Encounter Bay =

Bay on the south central coast of South Australia

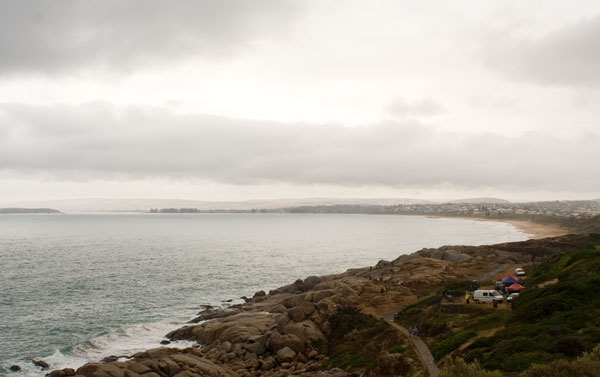
- Encounter Bay from Port Elliot, South Australia

- Location in South Australia
- Location: Fleurieu and Sir Richard Peninsulas, South Australia
- Coordinates: 35°34′40″S 138°35′35″E
- Type: Bay
- Primary inflows: River Murray
- Basin countries: Australia
- Islands: Granite Island, Pullen Island, Seal Island, Wright Island
- Settlements: Victor Harbor; Goolwa, Middleton & Port Elliot

Encounter Bay is a bay in the Australian state of South Australia located on the state's south central coast about 100 kilometres (62 mi) south of the state capital of Adelaide. It was named by Matthew Flinders after his encounter on 8 April 1802 with Nicolas Baudin, the commander of the Baudin expedition of 1800–03. It is the site of both the mouth of the River Murray and the regional city of Victor Harbor. It is one of four "historic bays" located on the South Australian coast.

== Extent ==
There are at least two definitions of the bay's extent:

- Firstly, the US National Geospatial-Intelligence Agency states that Newland Head is its westerly extremity while the mouth of the River Murray is the easterly extremity.
- Secondly, Australian authorities consider the bay's extent consists of all of the sea north of a line running east from the southern tip of Rosetta Head to the Younghusband Peninsula. Encounter Bay is one of four bays on the South Australian coast considered by the Australian government to be a "historic bay" under the Seas and Submerged Lands Act 1973, and was proclaimed as such in 1987 and again in both 2006 and 2016, with the result that the mouth of the bay is on the territorial seas baseline and the waters within the bay are internal waters as per the definition used in United Nations Convention on the Law of the Sea.

== History ==
=== Aboriginal occupation ===
Although traditional ownership has long been ascribed to the Ramindjeri clan of the Ngarrindjeri people, linguist Rob Amery of the University of Adelaide suggested in a 1998 paper that Kaurna traditional lands "may have extended as far eastward as Encounter Bay and that the occupation of Encounter Bay by the Ramindjeri in the late 1830s may have been a response to the activities of whalers in the area". He also notes that the "Encounter Bay people" mentioned in 1836 by Colonel Light and his party at Rapid Bay in 1836 spoke the Kaurna language.

The Ramindjeri language name for Encounter Bay was Ramong, although some sources ascribe this name to The Bluff only.

=== European arrival ===
Encounter Bay was named by Matthew Flinders on 8 April 1802 after his encounter with Nicolas Baudin, both of whom were charting the Australian coastline for their respective countries (Britain and France). The encounter between the scientists was peaceful, even though they believed their countries were at war at the time. (Both parties were unaware that the Treaty of Amiens, ceasing hostilities, had been signed on 25 March 1802.)

After British colonisation of South Australia, shore-based bay whaling stations operated on the coast of Encounter Bay from June 1837 at Police Point, Granite Island and Rosetta Head, which was also referred to as Rosetta Harbour). The last of these closed down in 1855. They were the most successful and longest lasting whaling stations in South Australia. An attempt was made to re-establish the fishery in 1871–72.

== Description ==
The bay's coastline is the site for the following settlements: Victor Harbor, Port Elliot, Middleton and Goolwa.

The Murray, Inman and Hindmarsh Rivers drain into the bay.

Islands located within Encounter Bay include (from west to east): Wright Island, Granite Island, Seal Island (also known as Seal Rock) and Pullen Island.

A small beach known as Kings Beach lies within the bay. It was named after an early settler in the area, Eli King, who built a family home for himself and his wife Drucilla in 1858. There is a car park and walking trail which passes or starts at the beach, passing the rocky Petrel Cove on its way to The Bluff.

== Protected areas ==
The following protected areas exist within the bay's waters: the Granite Island Recreation Park, the Pullen Island Conservation Park and the West Island Conservation Park, while the bay's waters are within the boundaries of the Encounter Marine Park. The following protected areas adjoin the shores of the bay: the Coorong National Park.

== See also ==
- Encounter (disambiguation)
- Oceanic Victor
