= Electoral district of Finniss =

South Australian state electoral district

Finniss South Australia—House of Assembly
- Interactive map of electoral district boundaries from the 2022 state election (Note: The electorate will have no change in boundaries at the 2026 state election.)
- State: South Australia
- Created: 1993
- MP: Lou Nicholson
- Party: Independent
- Namesake: B. T. Finniss
- Electors: 29,543 (2026)
- Area: 1,396 km^{2} (539.0 sq mi)
- Demographic: Regional and Rural
- Coordinates: 35°28′49″S 138°41′34″E
Electorates around Finniss:
Mawson	Heysen	Hammond
Mawson	Finniss	Hammond
Southern Ocean	Southern Ocean	MacKillop

Finniss is a single-member electoral district for the South Australian House of Assembly. It is named after B. T. Finniss, the first Premier of South Australia. It covers the regional City of Victor Harbor and surrounding rural areas situated in the southern part of the state which includes the localities of Back Valley, Clayton Bay, Currency Creek, Encounter Bay, Finniss, Goolwa, Goolwa Beach, Goolwa North, Goolwa South, Hayborough, Hindmarsh Island, Hindmarsh Tiers, Hindmarsh Valley, Lower Inman Valley, McCracken, Middleton, Milang, Mosquito Hill, Mount Compass, Mount Observation, Mundoo Island, Nangkita, Port Elliot, Point Sturt, Tooperang, and Victor Harbor; as well as parts of Inman Valley and Waitpinga.

== History ==
Finniss has been a very safe seat for the Liberal Party since its creation at the 1991 electoral redistribution as a replacement for the equally safe Alexandra. Dating to its time as part of Alexandra, the area now in Finniss has been held by Liberals or their predecessor, the Liberal and Country League, without interruption since 1941. For most of that time, it has been a comfortably safe LCL/Liberal seat.

It was contested for the first time at the 1993 election by newly elected Liberal leader Dean Brown, who had returned to parliament after a seven-year absence by winning the 1992 Alexandra state by-election. Brown had little difficulty winning Finniss, and subsequently became Premier after the election. Brown was later toppled as Premier by Liberal rival John Olsen in 1996, and was initially expected to retire, but remained in parliament as a senior member of consecutive Liberal ministries and shadow ministries, and served as deputy leader of the Liberal Party from 2001 to 2005—the first six months of that tenure as Deputy Premier. Brown retired at the 2006 election, and was succeeded by Liberal candidate Michael Pengilly, who held off a concerted attempt by the SA Nationals to take the seat.

Pengilly held the seat easily until retiring at the 2018 election. David Basham retained the seat for the Liberals, despite a spirited challenge from SA-BEST. Indeed, SA-BEST's showing in Finniss was strong enough to make the seat marginal for the first time in its current configuration. However, Finniss remains a comfortably safe Liberal seat in a "traditional" two-party matchup with Labor; Basham only suffered a small swing against Labor.

Most of Finniss is located within the Centre Alliance-held federal Division of Mayo.

== Members for Finniss ==
Member	Party	Term
Dean Brown	Liberal	1993–2006
Michael Pengilly	Liberal	2006–2018
David Basham	Liberal	2018–2026
Lou Nicholson	Independent	2026–present

== Election results ==
2026 South Australian state election: Finniss
Party	Candidate	Votes	%	±%
Liberal	David Basham	6,940	27.2	−16.0
One Nation	Greg Powell	5,842	22.9	+18.1
Labor	Phoebe Redington	4,725	18.5	−4.4
Independent	Lou Nicholson	4,617	18.1	−1.5
Greens	Bartholomew Astill-Pearce	1,603	6.3	−0.5
Independent	Bron Lewis	1,045	4.1	+4.1
Animal Justice	Tanya Hussey	417	1.6	+1.6
Australian Family	David Abram	264	1.0	+1.0
Fair Go	Michael Scott	98	0.4	+0.4
Total formal votes		25,551	95.5	−1.4
Informal votes		1,210	4.5	+1.4
Turnout		26,761	90.6	−1.5
Two-party-preferred result
Liberal	David Basham	14,579	57.1	+0.3
Labor	Phoebe Redington	10,972	42.9	−0.3
Two-candidate-preferred result
Independent	Lou Nicholson	14,102	55.2	+5.9
Liberal	David Basham	11,449	44.8	−5.9
Independent gain from Liberal		Swing	+5.9	
