= Port Elliot, South Australia =

Port Elliot
- Town
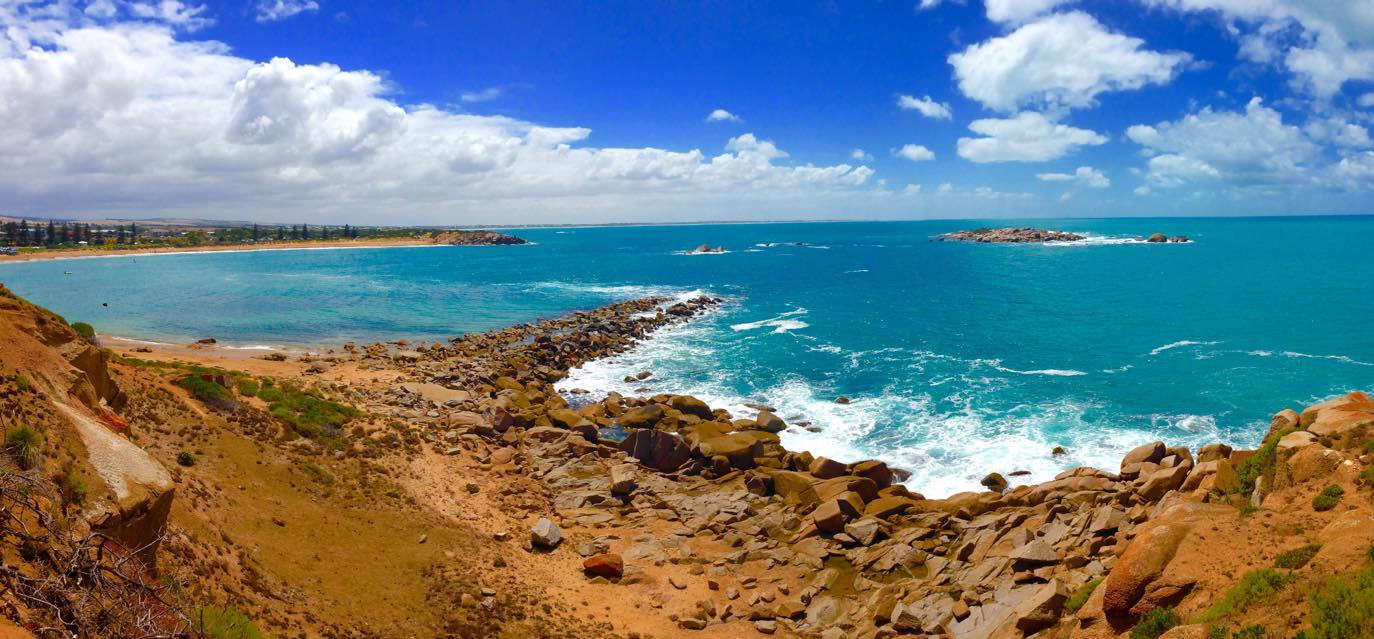
- Horseshoe Bay taken from Freeman's Nob, facing towards Commodore Point

- Coordinates: 35°32′04″S 138°40′44″E
- Country: Australia
- State: South Australia
- Region: Fleurieu and Kangaroo Island
- LGA: Alexandrina Council
- Location: 84 km (52 mi) from Adelaide
- Established: 22 April 1852 (town); 9 September 1993 (locality)

Government
  - State electorate: Finniss
  - Federal division: Mayo

Population
  - Total: 2,251 (SAL 2021)
- Time zone: UTC+9:30 (ACST)
  - Summer (DST): UTC+10:30 (ACST)
- Postcode: 5212
- County: Hindmarsh
- Mean max temp: 20.6 °C (69.1 °F)
- Mean min temp: 10.3 °C (50.5 °F)
- Annual rainfall: 551.7 mm (21.72 in)
Localities around Port Elliot
Hindmarsh Valley	Mount Jagged	Middleton
Hindmarsh Valley; Chiton	Port Elliot	Middleton; Encounter Bay
Encounter Bay	Encounter Bay	Encounter Bay

Port Elliot is a town in South Australia toward the eastern end of the south coast of the Fleurieu Peninsula. It is situated on the sheltered Horseshoe Bay, a small bay off the much larger Encounter Bay. Lady Bay is a small bay at the south-western end of Horseshoe Bay, past the jetty. Pullen Island lies outside the mouth of the bay.

The town was proclaimed in 1851, and was originally used as a port for neighbouring Goolwa. After a number of ships had been wrecked in the bay, and the railway line was extended westwards to Victor Harbor in 1864, Port Elliot ceased being used as a port. Today it is a quiet seaside town, popular with visitors for its sandy beach.

At the 2021 census, Port Elliot had a population of 2,251.

== History ==
Horseshoe Bay was proclaimed a port in 1851, and the settlement above the bay was officially named Port Elliot by proclamation on 22 April 1852. The town was named after Charles Elliot, the Governor of Bermuda, who was a friend of the then Governor of South Australia, Sir Henry Young. The location had been previously known as Freeman's Nob; (Note: Later, apparently incorrectly referred to as "Freeman's Knob".) the Aboriginal name for the area may have been "Witengangool".

Freeman's Nob was used as a lookout post for shore-base bay whaling stations in Encounter Bay in the late 1830s. The area was also used as a place to launch boats in 1842 for Hargan and Hart's whaling station at Rosetta Head.

The port was established to provide a safe seaport for the Murray River trade which terminated at Goolwa as the Murray Mouth was deemed too treacherous and unpredictable for safe navigation. Goods and passengers were carried between Goolwa and Port Elliot on the first public railway in Australia completed in 1854.

The government works to establish the port included Australia's first reticulated water supply, from wells at Waterport (about 1 km north of the bay) to tanks above the jetty which provided fresh water for ships as well as for the town. The early subdivisions of Waterport, Louisville, Findon, Ville St.Louis, and Elliot Town are now all considered part of Port Elliot.

In 1855 a breakwater, stretching from Lady Bay (at the southern end of Horseshoe Bay), was built. Using rock from the cliff, it was intended to protect ships when loading cargo. Four ships were wrecked in the bay in 1856 and Port Elliot's role as a port ended in 1866, after the railway was extended to Victor Harbor, which provided safer access for ships in 1864. The importance of the rail link between the river and the sea soon also ended with the building of a railway between Adelaide and Morgan which enabled river traffic to offload freight and passengers over 260 kilometres (160 mi) further upstream and rail them directly to Adelaide. The towns of the southern Fleurieu coast – Victor Harbor, Port Elliot, Middleton, and Goolwa – were spared any further commercial or industrial development, and became a popular holiday destination with many guest houses, camping parks, and "weekender" houses and shacks.

The town was proclaimed as a locality on 9 September 1993.

In 2007, Port Elliot became the focus of unwanted media attention due to the murder of 15-year-old Carly Ryan at Lady Bay. On 21 January 2010, a 50-year-old man from Victoria was found guilty of the murder while his son was found not guilty.

=== Little penguin colony ===
Little penguins once bred at Freeman's Nob. In 1981 a dog attack left at least 10 adult penguins dead and numerous eggs broken and empty. It was posited that this event may have rendered the colony extinct.

== Geography and climate ==
Port Elliot lies on the eastern end of the south coast of the Fleurieu Peninsula, on Horseshoe Bay, which is a small bay off the much larger Encounter Bay.

Lady Bay is a small bay at the south-western end of Horseshoe Bay, past the jetty.

Pullen Island lies outside the mouth of the bay.

The average maximum temperature is 20.6°C (69.1 °F), and the mean minimum 10.3°C (50.5 °F). The annual rainfall averages 551.7 mm (21.72 in).

== Governance and demographics ==
The town of Port Elliot is in the local government area of Alexandrina Council in the County of Hindmarsh. It lies in the Fleurieu and Kangaroo Island region of South Australia.

For state government (the Government of South Australia, it is within the Electoral district of Finniss, and for federal government, in the Division of Mayo.

In the 2021 census, the population was 2,251, with a median age of 61. Around 19% were tertiary-educated.

== Description ==
Visitor and resident reviews call Port Elliot a quiet township with a relatively safe sandy beach, attracting summertime tourism. A popular holiday destination, it is also close enough to Adelaide for day-trippers.

The town has many cafes, antique and homeware stores and second-hand book shops. The Hotel Elliot is a popular pub, and the Royal Family Hotel is situated in the main street.

There is a caravan park at the southern end, behind sand dunes, and a bowls club, playground, and cafe behind the seawall.

== Shipwrecks ==
The Port Elliot Maritime Heritage Trail highlights the area's role as the first seaport for River Murray trade. It also informs visitors about four wrecked vessels that are often exposed within the surf zone at Horseshoe Bay. The ships are also registered on the Australasian Underwater Cultural Heritage Database:

- Harry, a 2-masted wooden brig built in Bridport Harbour, Dorset, in 1842, wrecked 9 December 1856
- Josephine Loizeau, 2-masted wooden schooner built in on Mahe Island, Seychelles, in 1841; wrecked 10 July 1856
- Lapwing, 2-masted wooden cutter (although registered as a ketch in the 1852 Custom House Register) built in 1808 in Mevagissey, Cornwall; wrecked 5 September 1856
- Flying Fish, a 2-masted wooden schooner built in Hobart, Tasmania, in 1843, wrecked 3 December 1860

The sites of the wrecks of three other ships sites are thought to lie outside Horseshoe Bay and have not yet been located.

- Commodore, a 2-masted wooden schooner built in Dartmouth, Devon, in 1818; wrecked 28 February 1856
- Athol or Atholl, a 2-masted wooden brigantine built as Charlotte in Pictou, Canada, in 1853; wrecked 19 March 1864
- Emu, a 2-masted wooden schooner built in Leschenault, Bunbury, Western Australia, in 1847; wrecked 29 or 30 April 1853

== Beach erosion ==
The breakwater built in the 1850s has sustained damage over the years, and the beaches of Port Elliot and Victor Harbor have been facing rising seas.

A seawall along the beachfront, constructed in the 1930s and partly replaced in the 1980s, has been damaged by storm activity and heavy rainfall events and is need of repair. A report commissioned in 2025 by the council predicted that the bay at Port Elliot is likely to be eroded by up to 12 m (39 ft) by 2050 if nothing is done. It is suggested that, apart from repairs to the seawall, other engineering works need to be undertaken, including repairing and lengthening of the breakwater and more sand being brought in from elsewhere. The total cost of the works is estimated to be over A$20 million, some of which may be met by the state government.
