= Goolwa, South Australia =

Goolwa
- Town
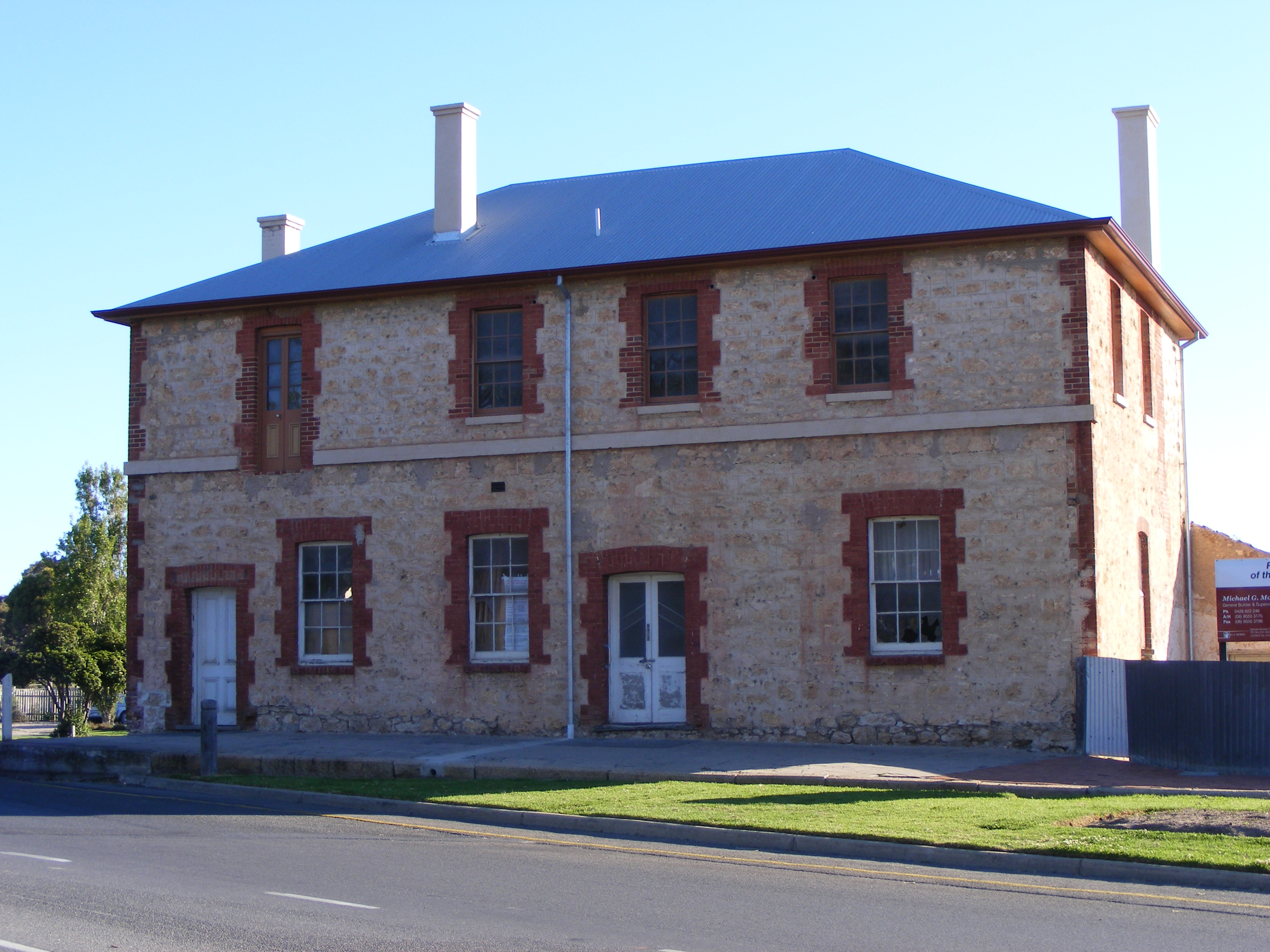
- "Australasian Hotel" building in Goolwa built in the Georgian architectural style, typical of the main street

- Coordinates: 35°30′0″S 138°46′0″E
- Country: Australia
- State: South Australia
- Region: Fleurieu and Kangaroo Island
- LGA: Alexandrina Council
- Location: 85 km (53 mi) from Adelaide
- Established: 1853

Government
  - State electorate: Finniss
  - Federal division: Mayo

Population
  - Totals: 2,350 (2016 census); 11,578 (2018)
- Postcode: 5214
- Mean max temp: 20.8 °C (69.4 °F)
- Mean min temp: 11.8 °C (53.2 °F)
- Annual rainfall: 383.2 mm (15.09 in)
Localities around Goolwa
Currency Creek	Currency Creek; Goolwa North	Goolwa North
Middleton	Goolwa	Hindmarsh Island
Middleton	Middleton; Goolwa Beach; Goolwa South	Goolwa South
- Climate; Adjoining localities

Goolwa (/ˈɡʊlə/ GUUL-ə), known as The Elbow to early settlers, is a historic river port on the Murray River near the Murray Mouth in South Australia. Goolwa is approximately 85 km (53 mi) south of Adelaide, and is joined by a bridge to Hindmarsh Island.

== History ==
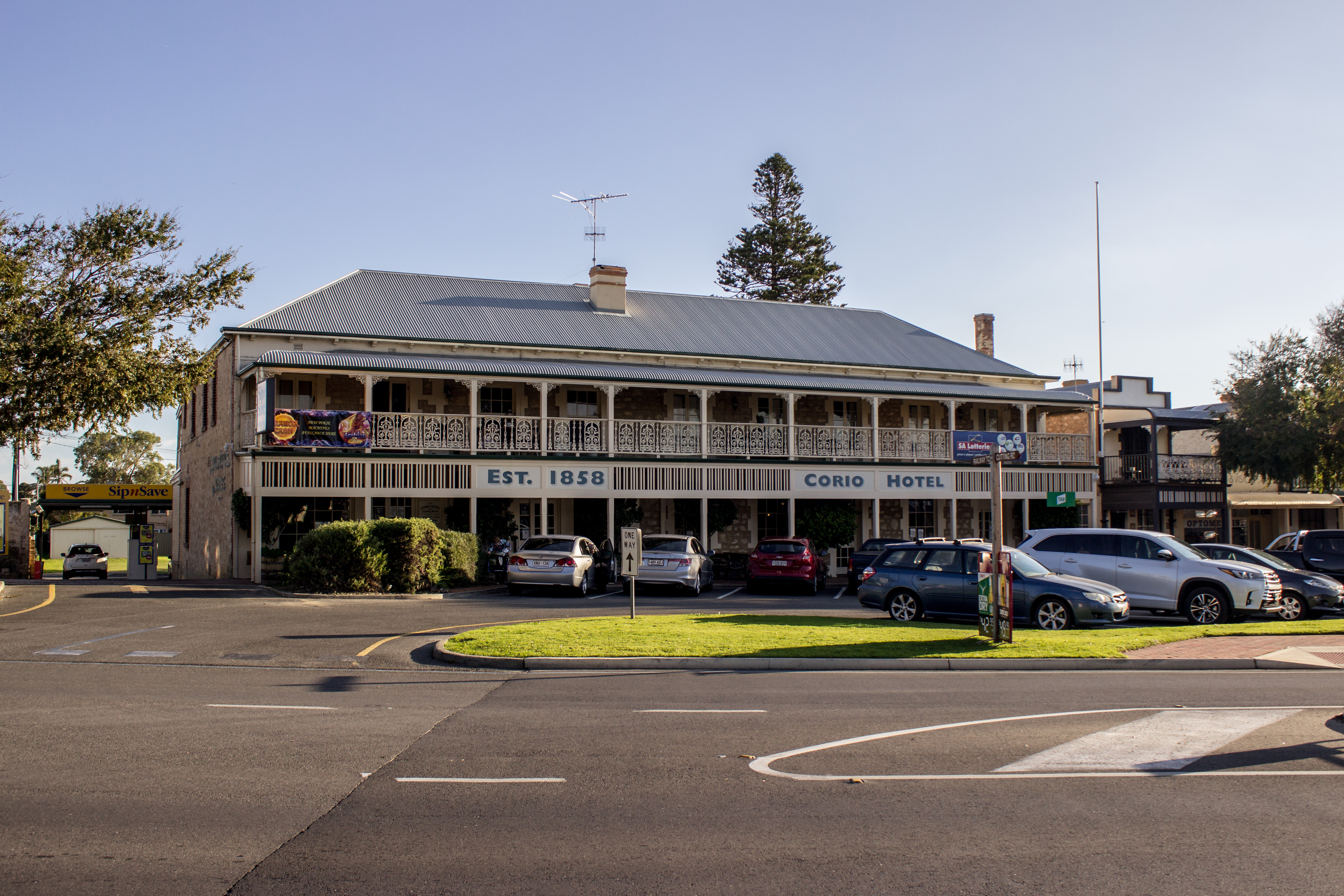
Corio Hotel in Goolwa

The name "Goolwa" means "elbow" in the Ngarrindjeri language, and the area was known as "The Elbow" to the early settlers.

Before 1837 the area was briefly considered for the site of the colony's capital; a special survey was undertaken in 1839–40, with a sizeable township laid out at Currency Creek and land for a port with substantial warehousing on the river where Goolwa now stands. A wharf was constructed in 1852 and government buildings soon followed, including a post office in 1853. However, the treacherous waters of the Murray Mouth made it difficult for shipping and made the town unsuitable as a major port.

Goolwa nevertheless developed as Australia's first inland port (1853). Australia's first railway was opened in 1854 to connect Goolwa to Port Elliot. It was later extended to Victor Harbor, allowing goods to move from river boats to ships, so that neither had to negotiate the Murray Mouth. Goolwa was officially established in 1857.

In 1919 the District Trained Nursing Society sent Clara Winifred Howie to establish a nursing facility in Goolwa.

The spread of railways to inland Australia put an end to the river trade and Goolwa's significance as a port. With the decline of the river trade Goolwa became dependent on local farming and fishing, as well as becoming a popular destination for holidaymakers from Adelaide.

In 1935 a permanent barrage (called the Goolwa Barrage) was constructed between Hindmarsh Island and Sir Richard Peninsula on the south eastern outskirts of Goolwa. The barrage separates the fresh water of the River Murray from the salt water coming up from the River Murray mouth. The barrage was constructed to prevent the salt water traversing further up the River Murray and polluting much needed fresh water.

Goolwa had earlier been connected to Hindmarsh Island by a cable ferry; this was replaced in 2001 by the official opening of the Hindmarsh Island bridge, the construction of which had been a focus of national controversy during the 1990s.

During 2008 and 2009 Goolwa suffered from one of the worst droughts in Australian history and the river which has sustained the town throughout its history was reduced to nothing much more than a channel and mudflats. The crisis prompted ongoing discussions with state and federal governments with the aim of releasing more water from upstream to ensure the survival of the river. In 2009 a temporary levee (called the Clayton Regulator) was constructed between Clayton Bay and the north east side of Hindmarsh Island. The Regulator was put in place to protect the Goolwa Channel and its tributaries from the danger of acid sulfate soils. The low water level was exposing the river bed and scientific evidence warned of the devastating impact of acidification of the Lower Lakes region. The Regulator immediately increased the water level between the Regulator and the Goolwa Barrage.

In 2010 increased rainfall and water from upstream allowed the Regulator at Clayton Bay to be substantially removed. The rainfall has replenished much of the river and lower lakes. In late 2010 some gates on the Goolwa Barrage were opened for the first time in many years to allow fresh water to flow to the Murray Mouth. Continued rainfalls combined with flooding upstream in New South Wales and Victoria led to massive flows down the River Murray, and by January 2011 all the gates on the Goolwa Barrage were open.

Historical population
Year	Pop.	±%
1921	563	—
1933		—
1947		—
1954		—
1961	638	—
1966	561	−12.1%
1971	681	+21.4%
1976	1,148	+68.6%
1981	1,624	+41.5%
1986	2,359	+45.3%
1991	3,018	+27.9%
1996	3,723	+23.4%
2001	4,327	+16.2%
2006	5,882	+35.9%
2011		—
2016	7,717	—
2021	8,756	+13.5%
Source: Australian Bureau of Statistics data.

== Location and governance ==
Goolwa is approximately 85 km (53 mi) south of Adelaide, and is the seat of the Alexandrina Council. It is in the state electoral district of Finnis and the federal Division of Mayo. At the 2011 census, the state suburb of Goolwa (excluding Goolwa Beach, Goolwa North and Goolwa South) had a population of 2,201. At June 2018, the estimated urban population for Goolwa together with nearby Victor Harbor was 26,532, having increased at an average annual rate of 1.07% year-on-year over the preceding five years. The portion of this combined urban area residing in Goolwa is 11,578.

== Culture and recreation ==
Every odd-numbered year, Goolwa hosts the South Australian Wooden Boat Festival (SAWBF).

The town is a popular holiday destination and home to the PS Oscar W, a paddle steamer.

The town has its own Australian rules football team called the Goolwa/Port Elliot Football Team; the current team began as separate teams with Goolwa's team founded 1878 and would merge with Port Elliot Football Team in 2001 to establish the current team, the team plays in the Great Southern Football League.

Goolwa, along with the neighbouring towns of Middleton and Port Elliot and the city of Victor Harbor have in the 2000s enjoyed a nationally recognised "sea change" boom, with people moving there from more metropolitan areas for an improved lifestyle on the coast.

The Catholic Church in Goolwa is dedicated to St John the Apostle.

In March 2007, Goolwa was declared a Cittaslow by visiting Cittaslow representatives. Goolwa was the first non-European town to gain Cittaslow status.

On 22 January 2010 the 4th stage of the Tour Down Under finished at Goolwa. As part of the event more than 8,000 cyclists, who participated in the preceding Mutual Community Challenge Tour, rode into Goolwa on the day.

On 6 February 2026 a Cessna 210 VH-RDH crashed overwater near Goolwa after the pilot was unable to exit from a intentional spin killing the three occupants.

== CLLMM Research Centre ==
In early February 2024, the Coorong, Lower Lakes and Murray Mouth (CLLMM) Research Centre, run by the Goyder Institute for Water Research, opened, located between the Hindmarsh Island bridge and the barrage. The centre's focus is on studying and adapting to the effects of climate change in the region, by using both First Nations and scientific knowledge.

== Climate ==
Goolwa has a warm-summer mediterranean climate (Köppen: Csb), with warm, dry summers and mild, wetter winters. There is some seasonal lag from oceanic influence, with average maxima ranging from 24.4 °C (75.9 °F) in February to 15.1 °C (59.2 °F) in July, and average minima fluctuating between 15.5 °C (59.9 °F) in February and 7.6 °C (45.7 °F) in July. Annual precipitation is moderately low, averaging 442.2 mm (17.41 in), between 144.3 precipitation days. Despite this, the town only has 46.3 clear days while having 181.5 cloudy days annually. Extreme temperatures have ranged from 43.0 °C (109.4 °F) on 14 January 1996 to 0.6 °C (33.1 °F) on 18 June 1998.

Climate data for Goolwa (Hindmarsh Island), elevation 11 m (36 ft), (2003–2025 normals and extremes 1989–present)
Month	Jan	Feb	Mar	Apr	May	Jun	Jul	Aug	Sep	Oct	Nov	Dec	Year
Record high °C (°F)	46.8 (116.2)	44.1 (111.4)	41.8 (107.2)	37.6 (99.7)	30.4 (86.7)	26.7 (80.1)	23.5 (74.3)	29.9 (85.8)	32.1 (89.8)	38.4 (101.1)	41.8 (107.2)	45.2 (113.4)	46.8 (116.2)
Mean daily maximum °C (°F)	25.5 (77.9)	24.7 (76.5)	23.9 (75.0)	21.7 (71.1)	18.4 (65.1)	15.9 (60.6)	15.4 (59.7)	16.5 (61.7)	18.7 (65.7)	21.1 (70.0)	23.1 (73.6)	24.6 (76.3)	20.8 (69.4)
Mean daily minimum °C (°F)	16.3 (61.3)	15.9 (60.6)	14.6 (58.3)	12.4 (54.3)	10.5 (50.9)	8.6 (47.5)	8.0 (46.4)	8.4 (47.1)	9.4 (48.9)	11.0 (51.8)	13.1 (55.6)	14.7 (58.5)	11.9 (53.4)
Record low °C (°F)	7.8 (46.0)	7.9 (46.2)	7.4 (45.3)	5.0 (41.0)	0.9 (33.6)	0.3 (32.5)	−0.1 (31.8)	1.0 (33.8)	1.4 (34.5)	4.4 (39.9)	5.2 (41.4)	7.0 (44.6)	−0.1 (31.8)
Average precipitation mm (inches)	17.7 (0.70)	16.1 (0.63)	14.4 (0.57)	27.7 (1.09)	44.4 (1.75)	56.6 (2.23)	48.8 (1.92)	47.2 (1.86)	39.5 (1.56)	28.0 (1.10)	24.5 (0.96)	24.7 (0.97)	388.7 (15.30)
Average precipitation days (≥ 0.2 mm)	5.0	5.3	6.9	11.0	15.4	18.3	17.8	17.3	14.5	9.9	8.4	7.5	137.3
Source: Bureau of Meteorology

== See also ==
- Goolwa Barrages
- List of crossings of the Murray River
