= Blue sprat =

Blue sprat is a common name for several fishes and may refer to:

- Spratelloides delicatulus
- Spratelloides robustus
