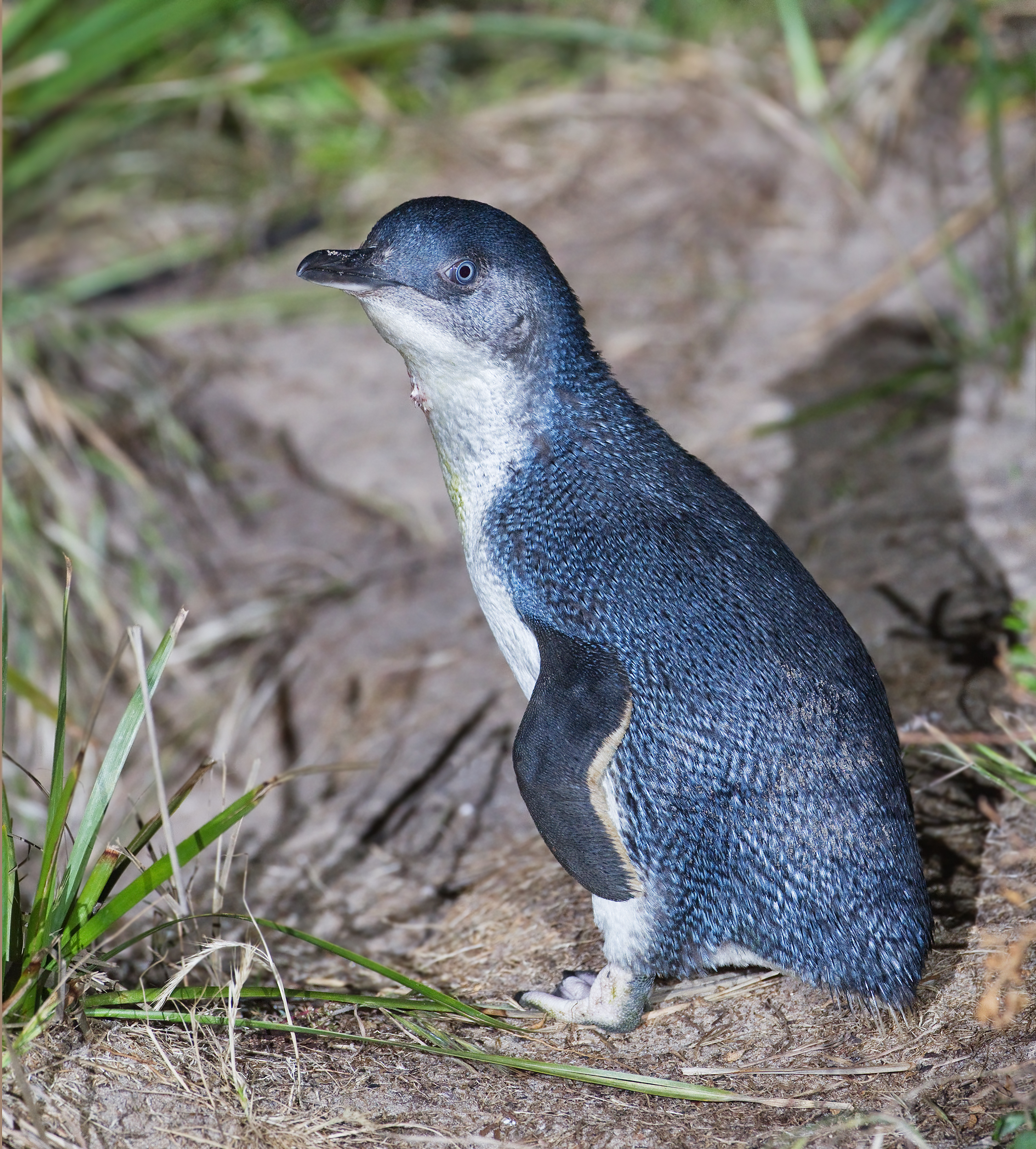
- Little penguin near burrow at night, Bruny Island, Tasmania, Australia

Conservation status
- Least Concern (IUCN 3.1) (Note: This IUCN assessment treats Eudyptula minor and Eudyptula novaehollandiae as just one species.)

Scientific classification
- Kingdom: Animalia
- Phylum: Chordata
- Class: Aves
- Order: Sphenisciformes
- Family: Spheniscidae
- Genus: Eudyptula; Bonaparte, 1856
- Species: E. minor

Binomial name
- Eudyptula minor (Forster, 1781)
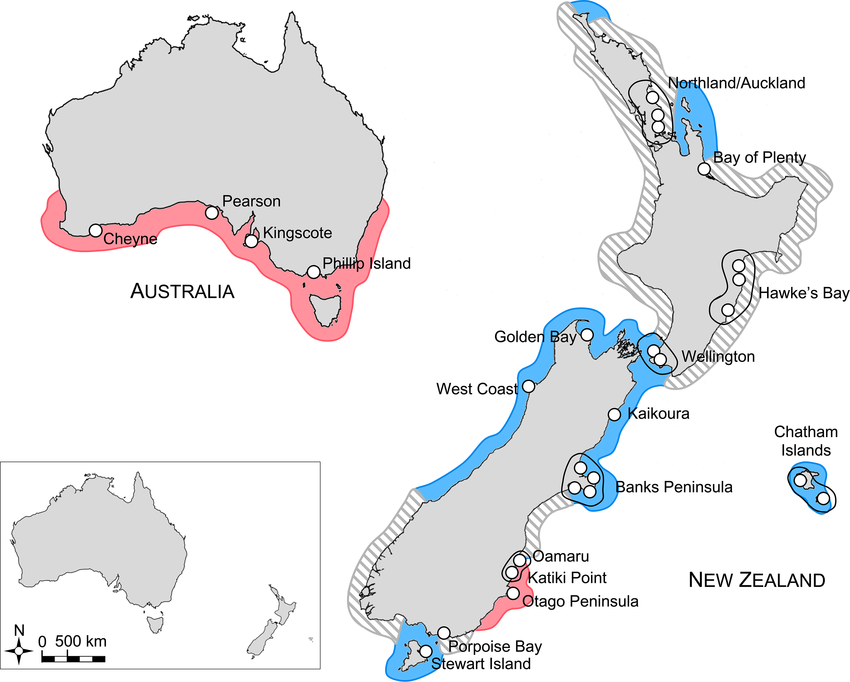
- Eudyptula minor is found in blue and dashed areas, and Eudyptula novaehollandiae in red areas.

= Little penguin =

Species of penguin

The little penguin (Eudyptula minor) is the smallest species of penguin in the world, and originates from New Zealand and Australia. It is commonly known as the fairy penguin, little blue penguin, or blue penguin, owing to its slate-blue plumage, and is also known by its Māori name kororā. It is a marine neritic species that dives for food throughout the day and returns to burrows on the shore at dusk. Eudyptula minor feathers are dense in melanosomes, which increase water resistance and give them their unique blue colour.

The Australian little penguin (Eudyptula novaehollandiae), from Australia and the Otago region of New Zealand, was initially described as Spheniscus novaehollandiae in 1826 but was later classified as Eudyptula minor novaehollandiae, a subspecies of the little penguin.

== Taxonomy ==
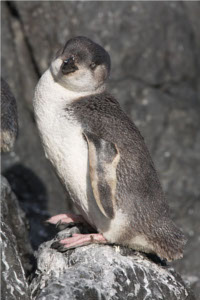
A white-flippered penguin in the South Island

The little penguin was first described by German naturalist Johann Reinhold Forster in 1781. Several subspecies are known, but a precise classification of these is still a matter of dispute. The holotypes of the subspecies E. m. variabilis and Eudyptula minor chathamensis are in the collection of the Museum of New Zealand Te Papa Tongarewa. The white-flippered penguin (E. m. albosignata or E. m. minor morpha albosignata) is currently considered by most taxonomists to be a colour morph or subspecies of Eudyptula minor. In 2008, Hadoram Shirihai treated the little penguin and white-flippered penguin as allospecies. However, as of 2012, the IUCN and BirdLife International consider the white-flippered penguin to be a subspecies or morph of the little penguin.

Little penguins from New Zealand and Australia were once considered the same species, called Eudyptula minor. Analysis of mtDNA in 2002 revealed two clades in Eudyptula: one containing little penguins of New Zealand's North Island, Cook Strait and Chatham Island, as well as the white-flippered penguin, and a second containing little penguins of Australia and the Otago region of New Zealand. Preliminary analysis of braying calls and cluster analysis of morphometrics partially supported these results. A 2016 study described the Australian little penguin as a new and separate species, Eudyptula novaehollandiae. E. minor is endemic to New Zealand, while E. novaehollandiae is found in Australia and Otago. A 2019 study supported the recognition of E. minor and E. novaehollandiae as separate species.

The IUCN assessment for Eudyptula minor uses Eudyptula minor and Eudyptula novaehollandiae interchangeably throughout the report to specify location, but considers them as two genetically distinct clades within the same species.

== Description ==
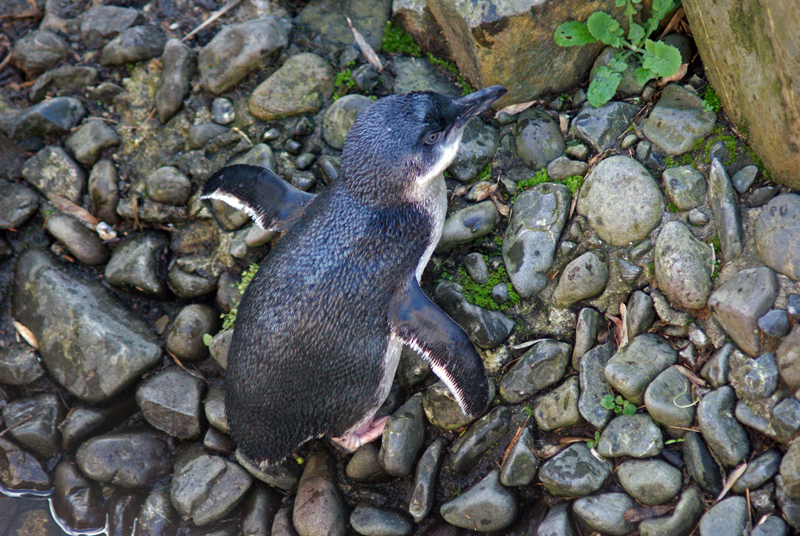
Little blue penguin in Wellington Zoo, New Zealand

Like those of all penguins, the wings of Eudyptula species have developed into flippers used for swimming.

Eudyptula species typically grow to between 30 and 33 cm (12 and 13 in) tall and on average weigh 1.5 kg (3.3 lb). The head and upper parts are blue in colour, with slate-grey ear coverts fading to white underneath, from the chin to the belly. Their flippers are blue in colour. The dark grey-black beak is 3–4 cm (1.2–1.6 in) long, the irises pale silvery- or bluish-grey or hazel, and the feet pink above with black soles and webbing. An immature individual will have a shorter bill and lighter upperparts.

Like most seabirds, the Eudyptula species have a long lifespan. The average for the species is 6.5 years, but flipper ringing experiments show that in very exceptional cases they may live up to 25 years in captivity.

Eudyptula minor does not have the distinct bright blue feathers that distinguish Eudyptula novaehollandiae. In addition, the vocalisation patterns of the New Zealand lineage located on Tiritiri Matangi Island vary from the Australian lineage located in Oamaru. Females are known to prefer the local call of the New Zealand lineage.

There are also behavioural differences that help differentiate these penguins. Those of the Australian lineage will swim together in a large group after dusk and walk along the shore to reach their nesting sites. This may be an effective predator avoidance strategy by traveling in a large group simultaneously. This has not been seen by those of the New Zealand lineage. Eudyptula minor only recently encountered terrestrial vertebrate predators, while Eudyptula novaehollandiae would have had to deal with carnivorous marsupials.

Also, Eudyptula novaehollandiae located in Australia will double brood. Birds will double brood by laying another clutch of eggs in hopes to increase their reproductive success. They complete this after the first clutch has successfully fledged. They may also do this due to the increasing sea surface temperatures and changing sources of food that are available. This behaviour has never been observed by those in New Zealand.

== Distribution and habitat ==
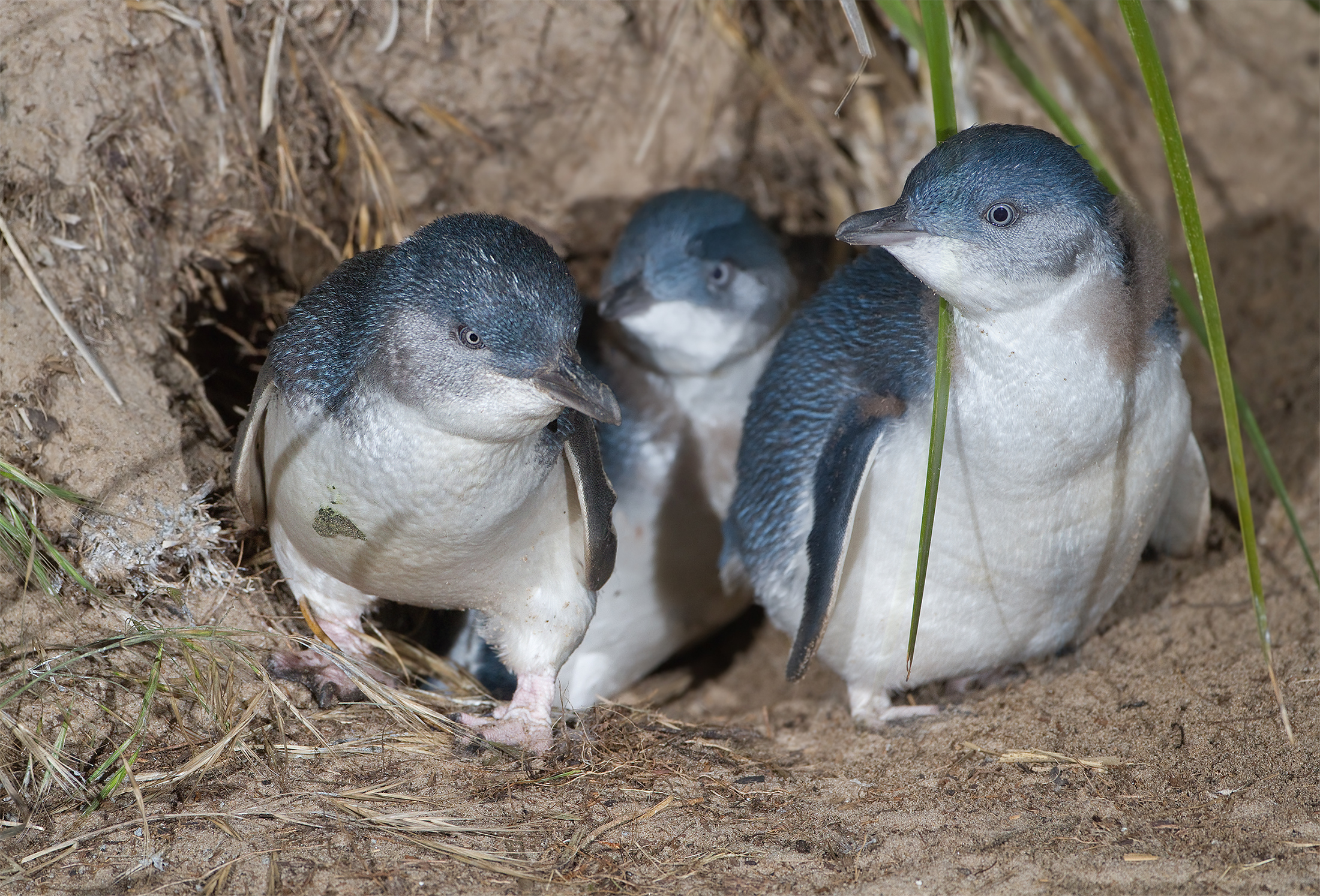
Eudyptula novaehollandiae family exiting burrow

The Australian little penguin is native to Southern Australia. The species also colonised the Otago region of New Zealand after the human-caused decline of the endemic species Eudyptula minor.

Tagged or banded birds later recaptured or found deceased have shown that individual birds can travel great distances during their lifetimes. In 1984, a penguin that had been tagged at Gabo Island in eastern Victoria was found dead at Victor Harbor in South Australia. Another little penguin was found near Adelaide in 1970 after being tagged at Phillip Island in Victoria the previous year. In 1996, a banded penguin was found dead at Middleton. It had been banded in 1991 at Troubridge Island in Gulf St Vincent, South Australia.

The Australian little penguin's foraging range is quite limited in terms of distance from shore when compared to seabirds that can fly.

=== Australia ===
The Australian little penguin occurs across Southern Australia, including New South Wales, Victoria, Tasmania, South Australia, Western Australia, and the Jervis Bay Territory. Colonies primarily exist on offshore islands, where they are protected from feral terrestrial predators and human disturbance. Colonies are found from Port Stephens in northern New South Wales around the southern coast to Fremantle, Western Australia. Foraging penguins have occasionally been seen as far north as Southport, Queensland and Shark Bay, Western Australia.

==== New South Wales ====
An endangered population of Australian little penguins exists at Manly, in Sydney's North Harbour. The population is protected under the NSW Threatened Species Conservation Act 1995 and has been managed in accordance with a Recovery Plan since the year 2000. The population once numbered in the hundreds but has decreased to around 60 pairs of birds. The decline is believed to be mainly due to loss of suitable habitat, attacks by foxes and dogs and disturbance at nesting sites.

The largest colony in New South Wales is on Montague Island. Up to 8,000 breeding pairs are known to nest there each year. Additional colonies exist on the Tollgate Islands in Batemans Bay.

Additional colonies exist in the Five Islands Nature Reserve, offshore from Port Kembla, and at Boondelbah Island, Cabbage Tree Island, and the Broughton Islands off Port Stephens.

==== Jervis Bay Territory ====
A population of about 5,000 breeding pairs exists on Bowen Island. The colony has increased from 500 pairs in 1979 and 1500 pairs in 1985. During this time, the island was privately leased. The island was vacated in 1986.

==== South Australia ====
In South Australia, many Australian little penguin colony declines have been identified across the state. In some cases, colonies have declined to extinction (including the Neptune Islands, West Island, Wright Island, Pullen Island, and several colonies on western Kangaroo Island), while others have declined from thousands of animals to few (Granite Island and Kingscote). The only known mainland colony exists at Bunda Cliffs on the state's far west coast, though colonies have existed historically on the Yorke Peninsula. A report released in 2011 presented evidence supporting the listing of the statewide population or the more closely monitored sub-population from Gulf St. Vincent as Vulnerable under South Australia's National Parks & Wildlife Act 1972. As of 2014, the little penguin is not listed as a species of conservation concern, despite ongoing declines at many colonies.

===== Encounter Bay and Granite Island =====
The Granite Island population has undergone a significant decline since the 20th century. In July 1991, National Parks and Wildlife Service South Australia estimated the Encounter Bay area (which includes Granite, West, and Wright Islands) population of little penguins to total 7,000 birds. A general population count conducted in early December 1991 found 571 penguins on Granite Island, and a total of 2600 in the Encounter Bay area. In 1992, Granite Island's population was believed to be stable, estimated to total between 1000 and 1500 little penguins. In 1998, the colony was considered to be "very healthy" and was estimated to contain 1800 birds.

Before 2000, the estimated number of penguins on Granite Island was alternatively estimated as over 3000 or "more than 1600", but numbers have dropped dramatically since then. Rats and foxes have both been threats to the population of little penguins at times, and the millennium drought contributed to a steep decline in numbers after 2001.

In 2001, the population count was 1,548 penguins. A count conducted in October 2013 totalled 38 penguins. A fox attack on Granite Island in 2020 reduced the population to 12 penguins. In late 2020, nesting little penguins were discovered on West Island, indicating recolonisation had occurred on that island since 2013, when none were found.

A December 2022 survey estimated 22 birds on Granite Island, with a different study putting the number at 26 that year. After 28 birds were counted in mid-2023, researchers were hopeful of a recovery in numbers. A count by volunteers in late 2025 revealed the number of birds to be around 36, up from 30 the previous year. There were 18 active burrows.

==== Tasmania ====
Tasmania has Australia's largest Australian little penguin population, with estimates ranging from 110,000 to 190,000 breeding pairs, of which less than 5% are found on mainland Tasmania. Roughly 20,000 pairs occur on Babel Island. Conservation activities, education campaigns, and measures to prevent dog attacks on Australian little penguin rookeries have been implemented.

==== Victoria ====
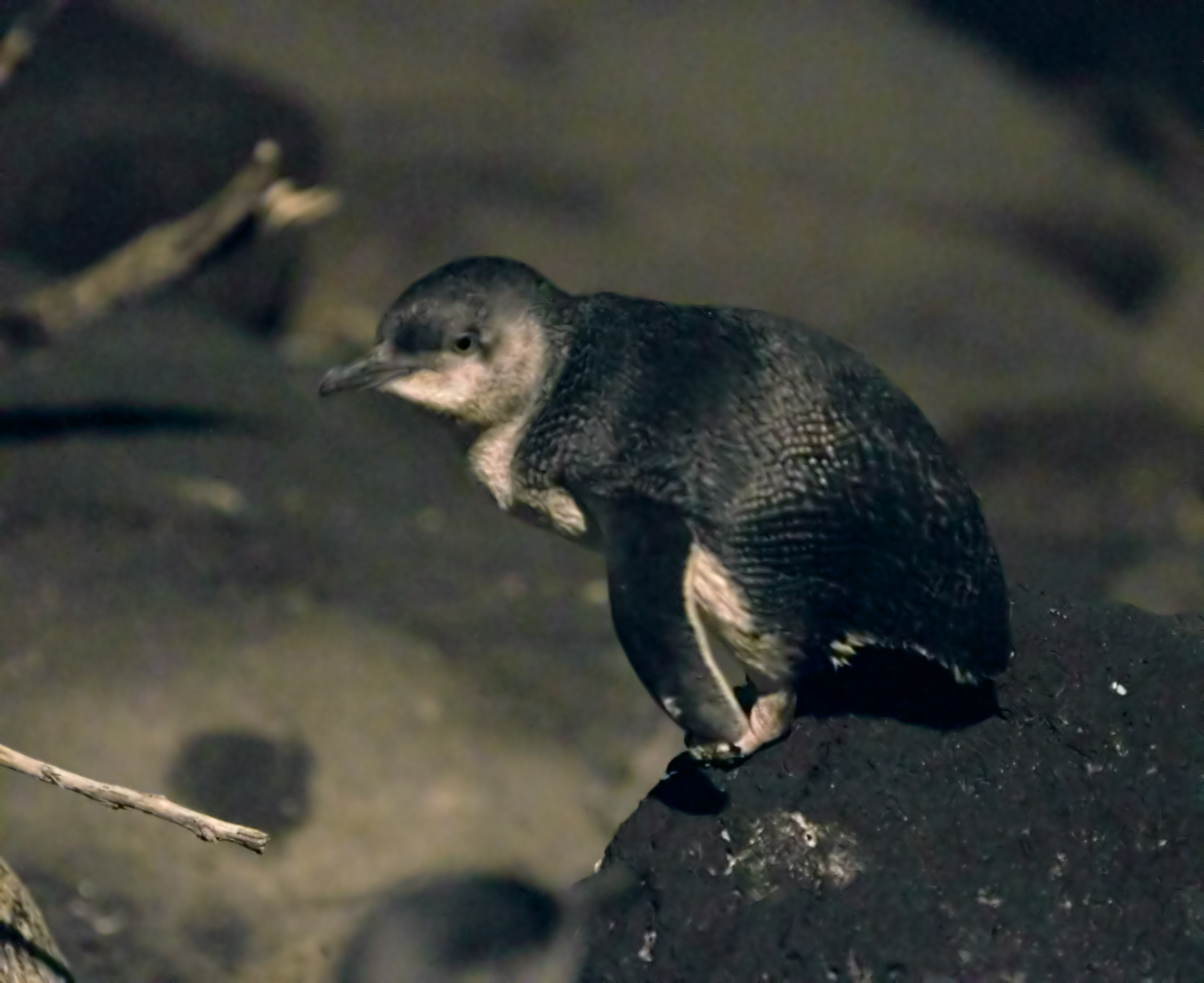
Little penguin at night at the St Kilda breakwater

The largest colony of little penguins in Victoria is located at Phillip Island, where the nightly 'parade' of penguins across Summerland Beach has been a major tourist destination, and more recently a major conservation effort, since the 1920s. Phillip Island is home to an estimated 32,000 breeding adults. Australian little penguins can also be seen in the vicinity of the St Kilda pier and breakwater in the inner suburbs of Melbourne. The breakwater is home to a colony of little penguins which have been the subject of a conservation study since 1986. As of 2020 the colony is 1,400 breeding adults and growing.

Little penguin habitats also exist at a number of other locations, including London Bridge and The Twelve Apostles along the Great Ocean Road, Wilsons Promontory, and Gabo Island.

==== Western Australia ====
The largest colony of Australian little penguins in Western Australia is believed to be located on Penguin Island, where an estimated 1,000 pairs nest during winter. Penguins are also known to nest on Garden Island and Carnac Island which lie north of Penguin Island. Many islands along Western Australia's southern coast are likely to support little penguin colonies, though the status of these populations is largely unknown. An account of little penguins on Bellinger Island published in 1928 numbered them in their thousands. Visiting naturalists in November 1986 estimated the colony at 20 breeding pairs. The account named another substantial colony 12 miles (19 km) from Bellinger Island and the same distance from Cape Pasley. Little penguins are known to breed on some islands of the Recherche Archipelago, including Woody Island where day-tripping tourists can view the animals. A penguin colony exists on Mistaken Island in King George Sound near Albany. Historical accounts of little penguins on Newdegate Island at the mouth of Deep River and on Breaksea Island in King George Sound also exist. West Australian little penguins have been found to forage as far as 150 miles (240 km) north of Geraldton (south of Denham and Shark Bay).

=== New Zealand ===
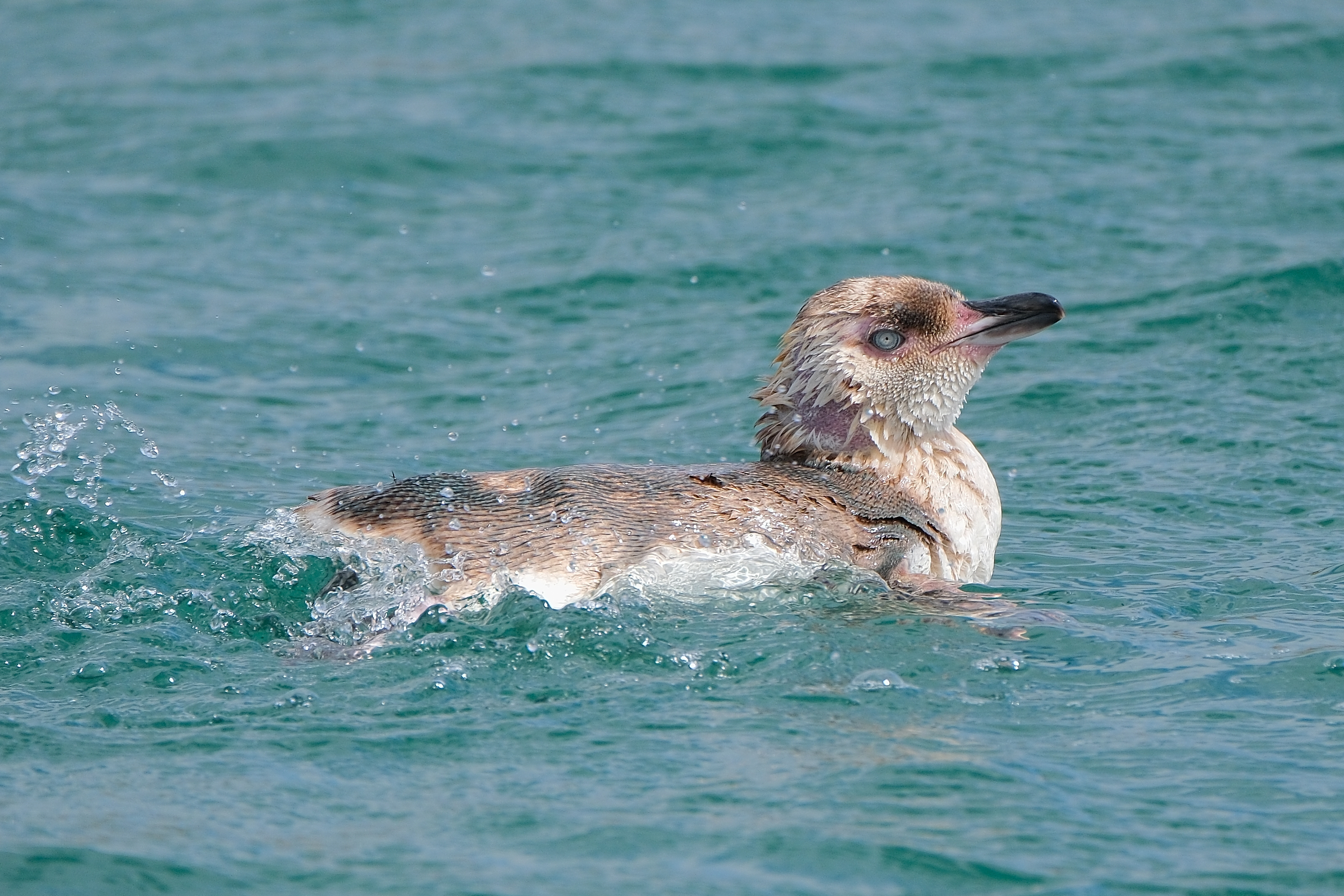
Swimming in Otago Harbour

While the main range of this penguin is in Australia, at least one population of Eudyptula novaehollandiae exists in Otago, which is located on the east coast of New Zealand's South Island. The chicks are raised in nests constructed in burrows along the shoreline, both dug by Eudyptula minor and by other animals. Eudyptula minor does not occur in Otago, which is located on the east coast of New Zealand's South Island. The Australian species Eudyptula novaehollandiae occurs in Otago.

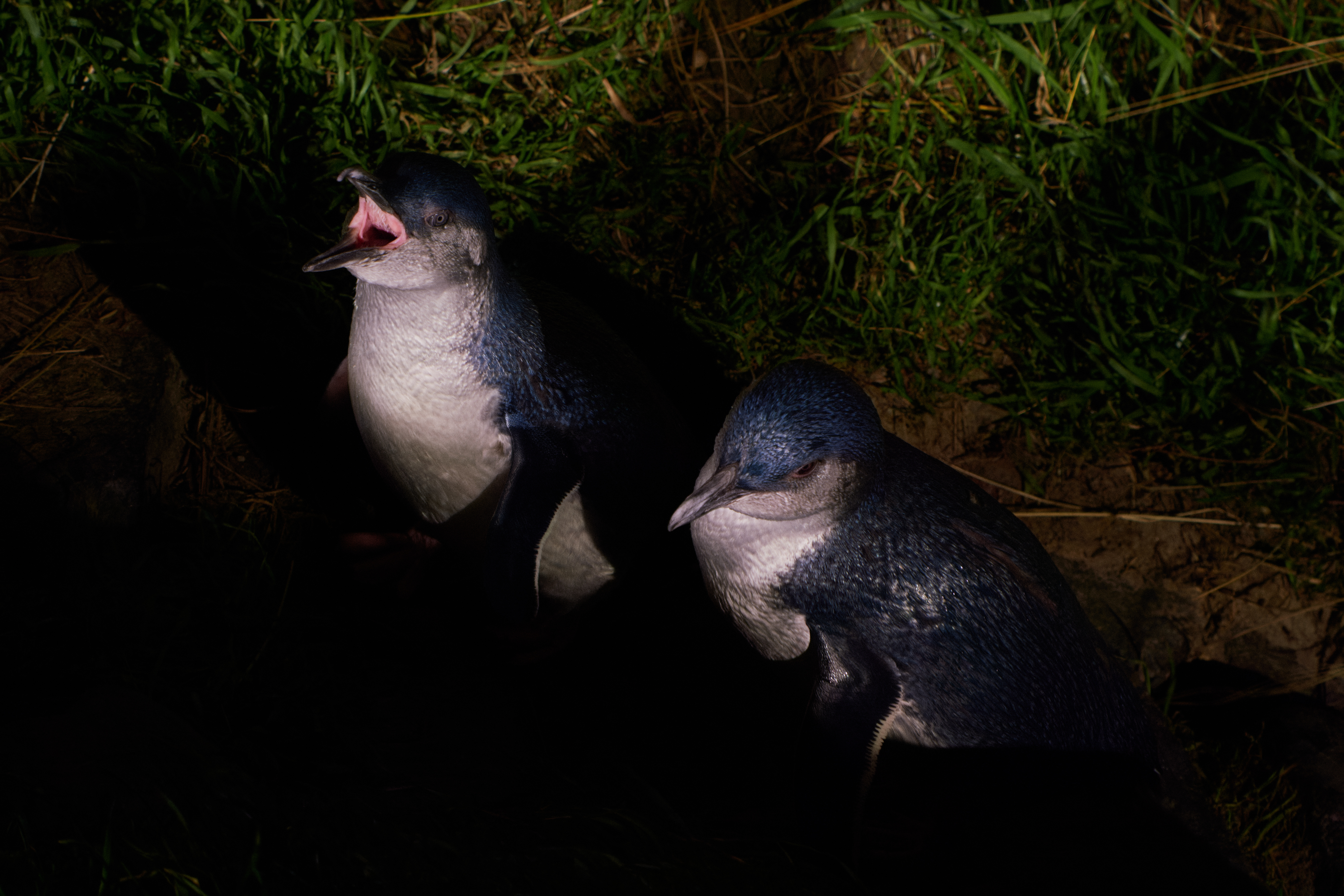
Two little blue penguins (Eudyptula minor) in Otago Peninsula

As E. novaehollandiae was originally endemic to Australia, the arrival of the Australian species in New Zealand was determined to have occurred roughly between AD 1500 and 1900. When the E. minor population declined in New Zealand, it left a genetic opening for E. novaehollandiae. The decrease of E. minor was most likely due to anthropogenic effects, such as being hunted by humans as well as introduced predators, including dogs brought from overseas. It has been determined that the population of Eudyptula novaehollandiae in Otago arrived even more recently than previously estimated due to multilocus coalescent analyses.

Outside of the Otago region, all colonies are expected to belong to the subspecies Eudyptula minor. Many of these colonies are smaller and more patchily distributed than larger Eudyptula novaehollandiae colonies that exist in Australia and Otago. Extensive research exists on Philip Island and Oamaru colonies as they are sites of large colonies which attract large groups of tourists Population size and trends of colonies in New Zealand remain poorly documented. What are known as colonies in New Zealand commonly consist of smaller fragmented groups in comparison to Australia's larger colonies, some with <10 breeding pairs. This is largely attributed to NZs fragmented coastline separating the larger colonies. This is commonly seen in Kaikōura where 6–7 smaller colonies have been found along 1.7% of coastline

=== Outside of Australasia ===
Sightings of Eudyptula have been reported from Chile, where they are known as pingüino enano, pingüino pequeño, or pingüino hada. These include on Isla Chañaral in 1995; at the Playa de Santo Domingo, San Antonio, 16 March 1997; 2005 in Chilean Antarctica; 2009 Isla Magdalena in the Magellan Straits; and in 2015 at Caleta Abarca beach in Vina del Mar.

In April 2005 the first recorded sighting of a living little penguin occurred on Ichaboe Island in Namibia.

== Behaviour ==
=== Feeding ===
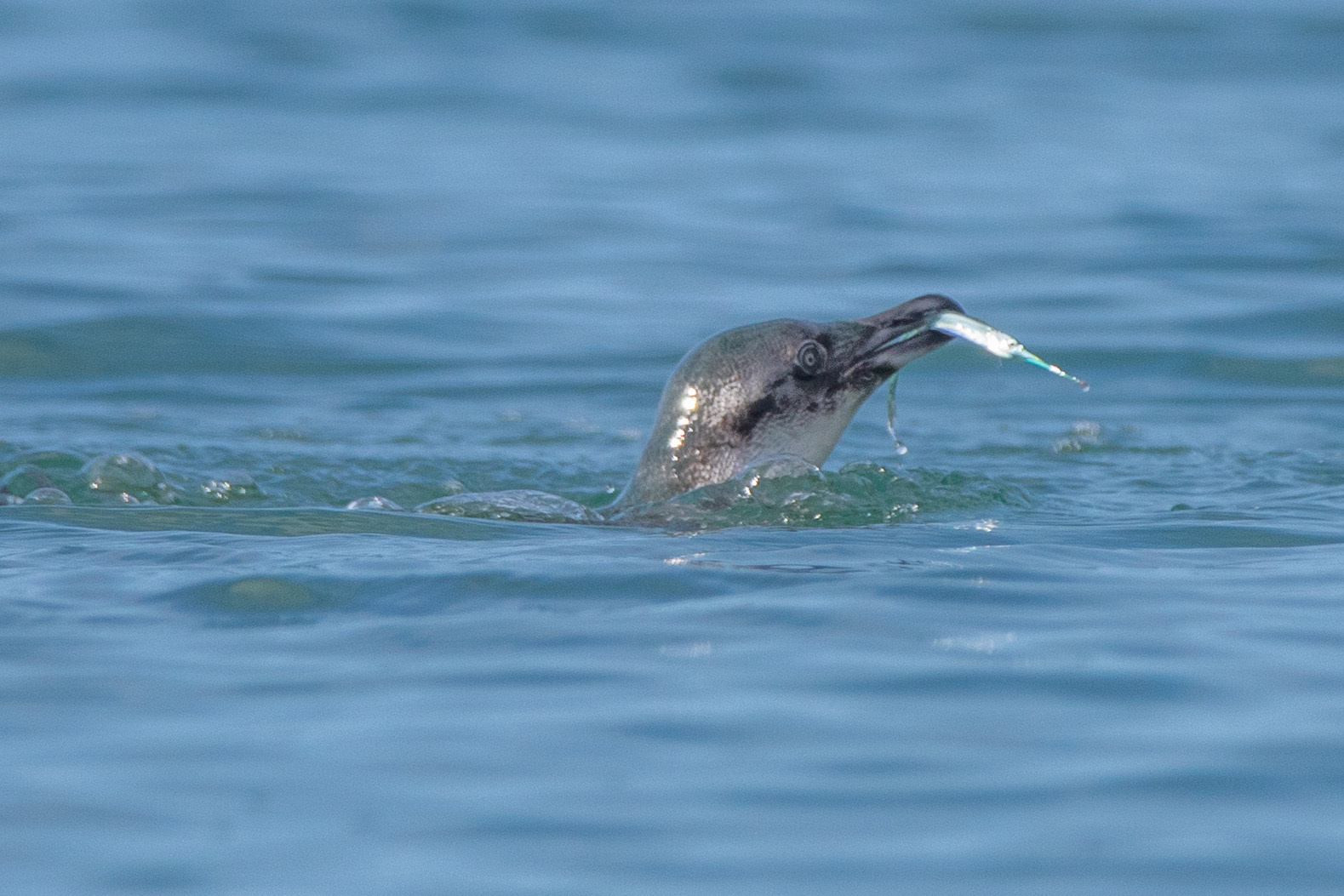
Feeding on New Zealand piper (Hyporhamphus ihi), Auckland

Little penguins feed by hunting small clupeoid fish, cephalopods, and crustaceans, for which they travel and dive quite extensively including to the sea floor. Researcher Tom Montague studied a Victorian population for two years in order to understand its feeding patterns. Montague's analysis revealed a penguin diet consisting of 76% fish and 24% squid. Nineteen fish species were recorded, with pilchard and anchovy dominating. The fish were usually less than 10 cm long and often post-larval or juvenile. Less common little penguin prey include: crab larvae, eels, jellyfish, and seahorses. In New Zealand, important little penguin prey items include arrow squid, slender sprat, Graham's gudgeon, red cod, and ahuru.

Little penguins are generally inshore feeders. The use of data loggers has shown that in the diving behaviour of little penguins, 50% of dives go no deeper than 2 m (6 ft 7 in), and the mean diving time is 21 seconds. In the 1980s, average little penguin dive time was estimated to be 23–24 seconds. The maximum recorded depth and time submerged are 66.7 metres (219 ft) and 90 seconds respectively. Tracking technology is allowing researchers from IMAS and the University of Tasmania to garner new insights into the foraging behavior of little penguins.

Little penguins are central place foragers, meaning they will travel distances to forage but always return to the same nest or colony. They are also a species where both parents are required to raise chicks, and alternate foraging trips while the other is guarding and incubating the nest during the post guard stage. These stints can last anywhere between 1–10 days during incubation. Despite nesting on the shore, little penguins forage at sea and feed on a diet ranging from small schooling fish, to cephalopods, krill, and microzooplankton. As the species is widely distributed across a range of habitats in New Zealand and Australia, variation in diet and foraging choice has also arisen. Important little penguin prey items include arrow squid, slender sprat, Graham's gudgeon, red cod, and ahuru.

Since the year 2000, the diet of the Australian little penguins of Port Phillip has consisted mainly of Australian anchovies (the primary food source), barracouta, anchovy, and Gould's squid. Pilchards previously featured more prominently in southern Australian little penguin diets prior to mass sardine mortality events of the 1990s. These mass mortality events affected sardine stocks over 5,000 kilometres (3,100 mi) of coastline. Jellyfish including species in the genera Chrysaora and Cyanea were found to be actively sought-out food items, while they previously had been thought to be only accidentally ingested. Similar preferences were found in the Adélie penguin, yellow-eyed penguin, and Magellanic penguin. An important crustacean present in the little penguin diet is the krill, Nyctiphanes australis, which surface-swarms during the day.

Although the diet of the Philip Island colony has diversified to include selections of cephalopods and krill during the post guard stage of their life cycle (where greater amounts of energy is required for chick development and egg production), resident penguins predominantly rely on anchovies when more energy is required.

The nature of their diet also impacts foraging methods, which may vary by colony depending on what food is available. When prey is larger and individuals are only catching 1–2 items at a time, they are more likely to hunt alone to reduce competition, whereas smaller and more mobile prey, or schooling prey species, promote group hunting to enable efficient encirclement. The Oamaru colony predominantly feeds on smaller schooling species such as sprat and gudgeon, while penguins from the Stewart/Codfish Island colonies more often hunt alone. The latter is likely linked to a predominantly cephalopods diet (58% of prey items at < 10 g each).

=== Foraging behaviour ===
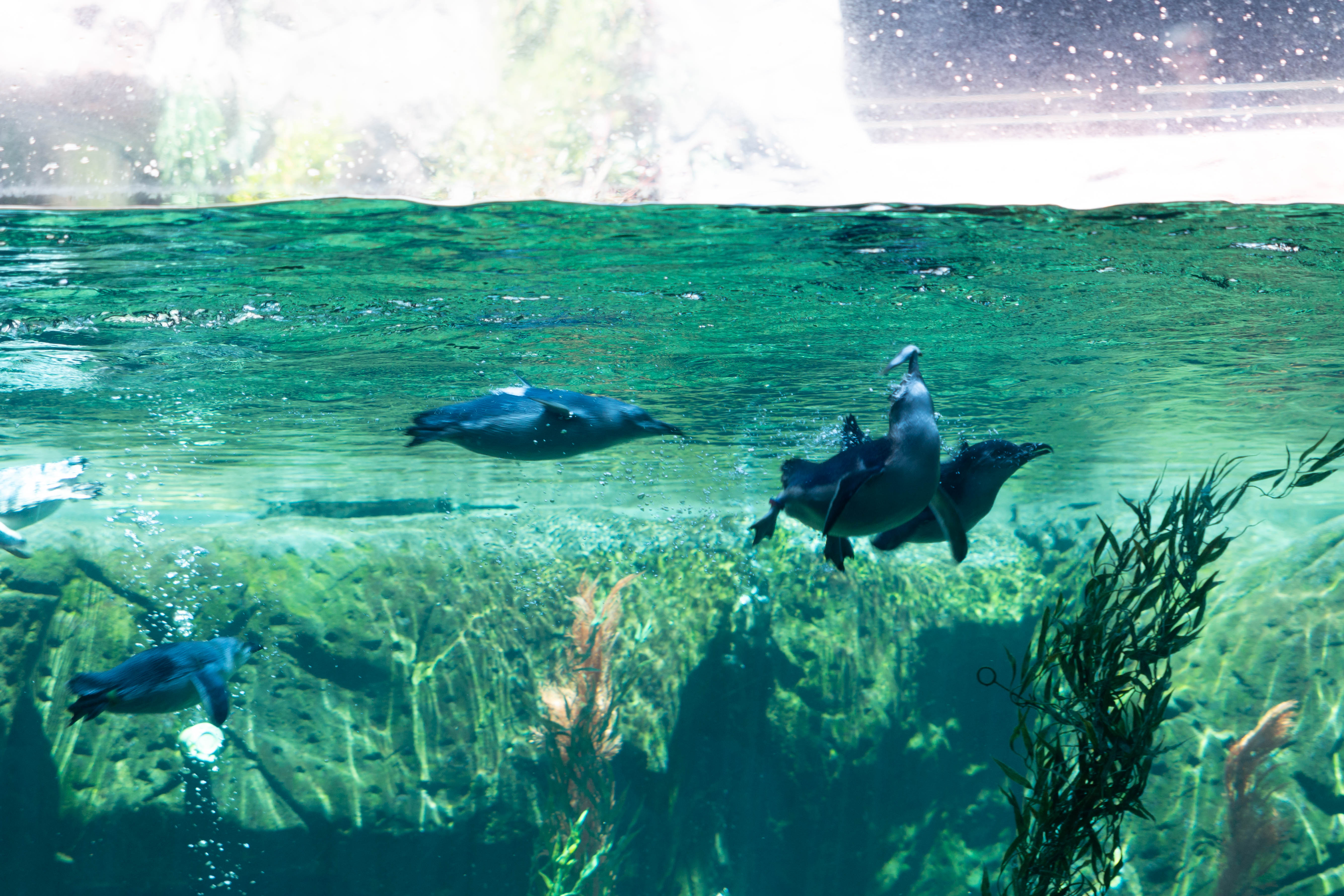
Eudyptula minor foraging at the International Antarctic Centre in Christchurch

Like many penguin species, Australian little penguins spend the largest part of their day swimming and foraging at sea. The species may also forage at night but never visits burrows during the day, making it the only penguin whose presence on land is strictly nocturnal. During the breeding and chick-rearing seasons, they travel within their home range to find food, but will return to their nest to feed both themselves and their chicks and return to their nests just after dusk. Thus, sunlight, moonlight, and artificial lights can affect the behaviour of attendance to the colony. Their foraging range is limited by how long chicks can fast, and the high energetic of costs of constant travelling for individuals.

This behaviour results in a small foraging range, and therefore a higher probability of competition when prey availability is more scarce. In order to survive, Eudyptula minor adapt to these constraints by increasing the plasticity and variability in their foraging behaviour, such as spatial, age, or diet based segregation, during breeding season when energy demands for both parents and chicks are at their highest. During chick rearing, parents will make on average one day long foraging trips within a 30 km (19 mi) radius of their nest.

Research conducted on the Philip Island colony found the spatial segregation of foraging behaviour was primarily determined by age rather than biological sex. Middle aged individuals foraged at greater distances from their nests and were able to dive greater distances, whereas older penguins were found to forage closer to the shore than middle aged adults. However, increased wind speeds negatively affect the little penguins' efficiency in foraging for chicks, for reasons not yet understood. Australian little penguins preen their feathers to keep them waterproof. They do this by rubbing a tiny drop of oil onto every feather from a special gland above the tail.

When foraging in groups for small schooling prey, they were also observed to all be of a similar age cohort. If the groups are segregated by age, this is likely because they are at the same foraging ability and occupy the same approximate range.

=== Prey availability ===
Food availability appears to strongly influence the survival and breeding success of little penguin populations across their range. Rising ocean temperatures have seen a trend towards earlier onset of breeding in Eudyptula minor which does not always align with the availability of their prey. This is because higher sea surface temperatures are associated with early onset of nesting, but also associated with lower nutrients and oxygen availability.

During the breeding season, parents are restricted to a short foraging area close to their nest and are therefore vulnerable to small regional changes. La Niña events increasing the sea surface temperature along the New Zealand coastline cause prey such as schooling fish and krill to either become more regionally scarce or migrate to new habitats.

Variation in prey abundance and distribution from year to year causes young birds to be washed up dead from starvation or in weak condition. This problem is not constrained to young birds, and has been observed throughout the 20th century. The breeding season of 1984–1985 in Australia was particularly bad, with minimal breeding success. Eggs were deserted prior to hatching and many chicks starved to death. Malnourished penguin carcasses were found washed up on beaches and the trend continued the following year. In April 1986, approximately 850 dead penguins were found washed ashore in south-western Victoria. The phenomenon was ascribed to lack of available food.

There are two seasonal peaks in the discovery of dead little penguins in Victoria. The first follows moult and the second occurs in mid-winter. Moulting penguins are under stress, and some return to the water in a weak condition afterwards. Mid-winter marks the season of lowest prey availability, thus increasing the probability of malnutrition and starvation.

In the late 1980s, it was believed that penguins did not compete with the fishing industry, despite anchovy being commercially caught. That assertion was made prior to the establishment and development of South Australia's commercial pilchard fishery in the 1990s. In South Africa, the overfishing of species of preferred penguin prey has caused African penguin populations to decline. Overfishing is a potential (but not proven) threat to the Australian little penguin.

In 1990, 24 dead penguins were found in the Encounter Bay area in South Australia during a week spanning late April to early May. A State government park ranger explained that many of the birds were juvenile and had starved after moulting. In 1995 pilchard mass mortality events occurred, which reduced the penguins' available prey and resulted in starvation and breeding failure. Another similar event occurred in 1999. Both mortality events were attributed to an exotic pathogen which spread across the entire Australian population of the fish, reducing the breeding biomass by 70%. Crested tern and gannet populations also suffered following these events. In 1995, 30 dead penguins were found ashore between Waitpinga and Chiton Rocks in the Encounter Bay area. The birds had suffered severe bacterial infections and the mortalities may have been linked to the mass mortality of pilchards that resulted from the spread of an exotic pathogen that year. However, the penguins were able to successfully adapt their diet to consist of slender sprat and pigfish.

=== Reproduction ===
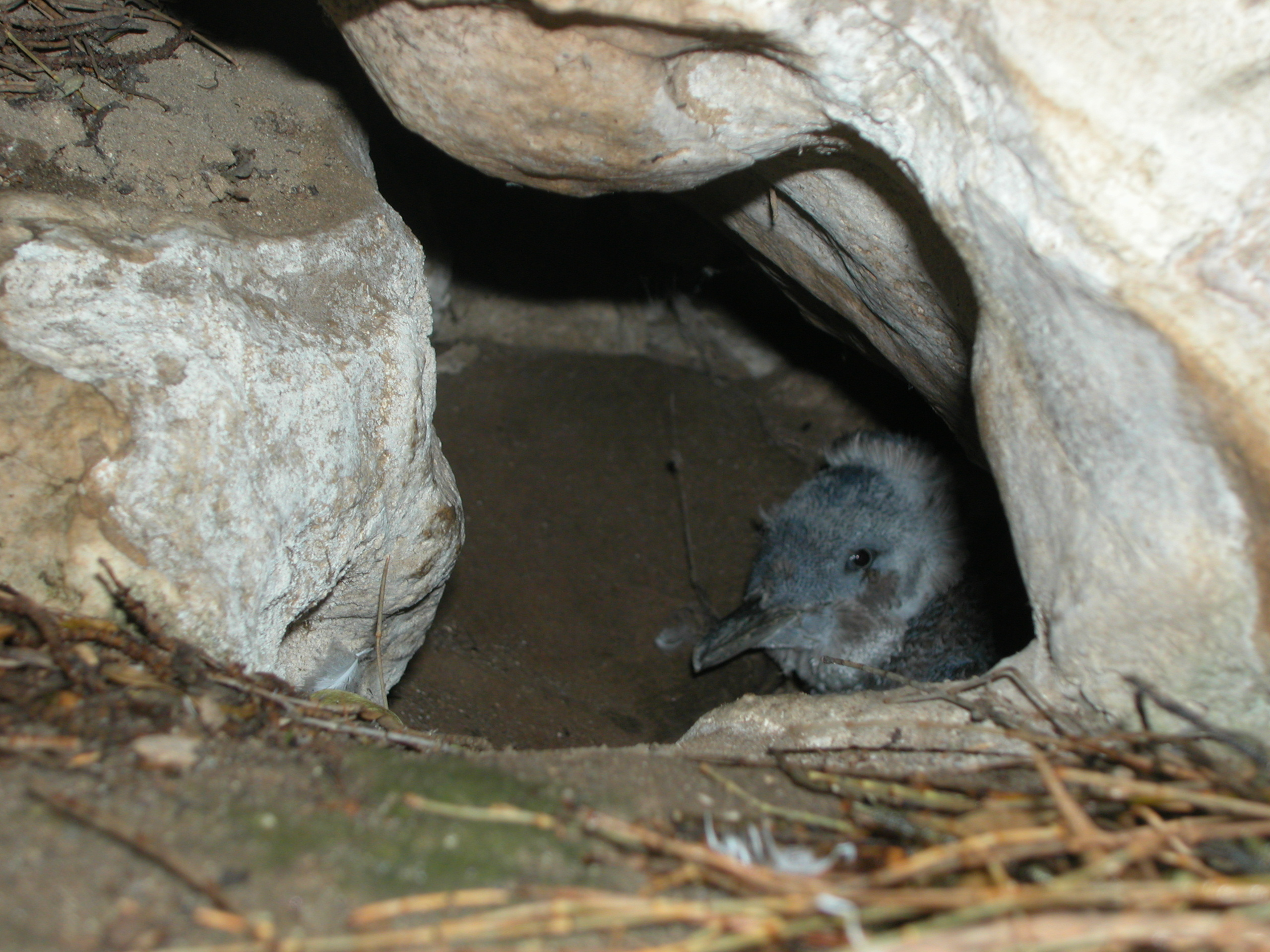
Chick in nest burrow

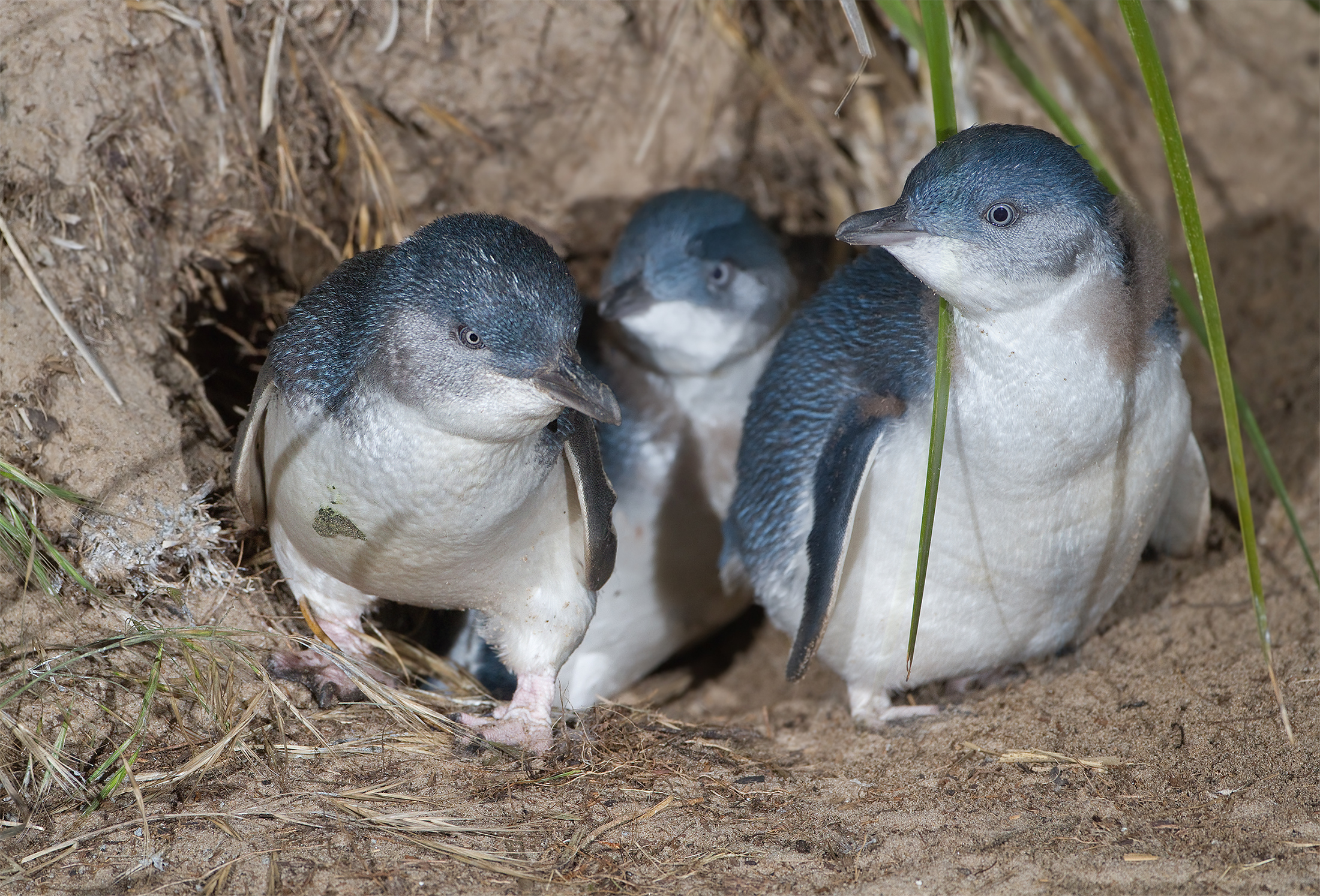
Little penguin (Eudyptula minor) family exiting burrow at night, Bruny Island

Australian little penguins reach sexual maturity at different ages. The female matures at two years old and the male at three years old.

Between June and August, males return to shore to renovate or dig new burrows and display to attract a mate for the season. Males compete for partners with their displays. Breeding occurs annually, but the timing and duration of the breeding season varies from location to location and from year to year. Breeding occurs during spring and summer when oceans are most productive and food is plentiful.

Australian little penguins remain faithful to their partner during a breeding season and whilst hatching eggs. At other times of the year, they tend to swap burrows. They exhibit site fidelity to their nesting colonies and nesting sites over successive years. Little penguins can breed as isolated pairs, in colonies, or semi-colonially.

==== Nesting ====
Penguins' nests vary depending on the available habitat. They are established close to the sea in sandy burrows excavated by the birds' feet or dug previously by other animals. Nests may also be made in caves, rock crevices, under logs, or in or under a variety of man-made structures including nest boxes, pipes, stacks of wood or timber, and buildings. Nests have been occasionally observed to be shared with prions, while some burrows are occupied by short-tailed shearwaters and little penguins in alternating seasons. In the 1980s, little was known on the subject of competition for burrows between bird species.

==== Timing ====
The timing of breeding seasons varies across the species' range. In the 1980s, the first egg laid at a penguin colony on Australia's eastern volcanos as early May or as late as October. Eastern Australian populations (including at Phillip Island, Victoria) lay their eggs from July to December. In South Australia's Gulf St. Vincent, eggs are laid between April and October and south of Perth in Western Australia, peak egg-laying occurred in June and continued until mid-October (based on observations from the 1980s).

Male and female birds share incubating and chick-rearing duties. They are the only species of penguin capable of producing more than one clutch of eggs per breeding season, but few populations do so. In ideal conditions, a penguin pair is capable of raising two or even three clutches of eggs over an extended season, which can last between eight and twenty-eight weeks.

The one or two (on rare occasions, three) white or lightly mottled brown eggs are laid between one and four days apart. Each egg typically weighs around 55 grams (1.9 oz) at time of laying. Incubation takes up to 36 days. Chicks are brooded for 18–38 days and fledge after 7–8 weeks. On Australia's east coast, chicks are raised from August to March. In Gulf St. Vincent, chicks are raised from June through November.

Australian little penguins typically return to their colonies to feed their chicks at dusk. The birds tend to come ashore in small groups to provide some defence against predators, which might otherwise pick off individuals. In Australia, the strongest colonies are usually on cat-free and fox-free islands. However, the population on Granite Island (which is a fox, cat, and dog-free island) has been severely depleted, from around 2000 penguins in 2001 down to 22 in 2015. Granite Island is connected to the mainland via a timber causeway.

==== Double brooding ====
If penguins produce a second clutch of eggs in a season once the first chicks have fledged, this is known as double brooding. Thus far this behaviour has only been observed in the Eudyptula novaehollandiae, the lineage of little blue penguins which inhabit Australian and Otago regions. There is no evidence to suggest this is an established behaviour within Eudyptula minor, however double broods are occasionally noticed among the colonies in the Kaikōura coastline. It is as yet unclear whether this means double brooding is a genetically mediated behaviour. A study carried out on Oamaru penguin colony found double broods to increase breeding success by up to 75% per season. Double brooding is more likely to occur in individuals who lay their first clutch, prior to mid-September. While there is some interannual variability, the most common period for little penguins to lay their first clutch is in spring, mid-September is considered early and gives individuals time left in the season to lay a second clutch of eggs after the first have fledged.

The onset of double brooding can be strongly influenced by sea surface temperature, age and food availability. Warmer sea surface temperature in summer and autumn correlated with earlier laying of first clutch of eggs increasing the chances of double brooding. In contrast, in New Zealand it was observed that during the La Niña phase of the El Niño Southern Oscillation when colder temperature water was brought to the surface, there was a delay in the onset of breeding for Eudyptula novaehollandiae, thus resulting in a lower incidence of double brooding in the Otago colonies. Age is also believed to be a factor affecting double brooding because the pairs successfully able to double brood were most commonly strategic in reclaiming successful nests and pair-bonds. Little penguins show a high nest fidelity, and the ability to reclaim success early suggests it is likely that successful double brooding is a behaviour that improves with age. Another influencing factor is the availability of food, for larger colonies such as the Philip Islands, competition for food can increase significantly during the breeding season, particularly if there is variability in the amount of prey available. If this competition results in aggression between adults, this can also influence ability to successfully raise chicks, and successfully breed in the next season.

=== Native predators ===
Predation by native animals is not considered a threat to little penguin populations, as these predators' diets are diverse. In Australia, large native reptiles including the tiger snake and Rosenberg's monitor are known to take little penguin chicks and common blue-tongued skinks are known to take eggs. At sea, Australian little penguins are eaten by long-nosed fur seals. A study conducted by researchers from the South Australian Research and Development Institute found that roughly 40 percent of seal droppings in South Australia's Granite Island area contained little penguin remains. Other marine predators include Australian sea lions, sharks, and barracouta.

The introduction of Tasmanian devils to Maria Island in 2012 led to the complete destruction of a population of Australian little penguins that numbered 3,000 breeding pairs before the introduction.

Australian little penguins are also preyed upon by white-bellied sea eagles. These large birds-of-prey are endangered in South Australia and not considered a threat to colony viability there. Other avian predators include: kelp gulls, pacific gulls, brown skuas, and currawongs.

In Victoria, at least one penguin death has been attributed to a water rat.

==== Parasites ====
Australian little penguins play an important role in the ecosystem as not only a predator to parasites but also a host. Recent studies have shown a new species of feather mite that feeds on the preening oil on the feathers of the penguin. Australian little penguins preen their mates to strengthen social bonds and remove parasites, especially from their partner's head where self-preening is difficult.

== Relationship with humans ==
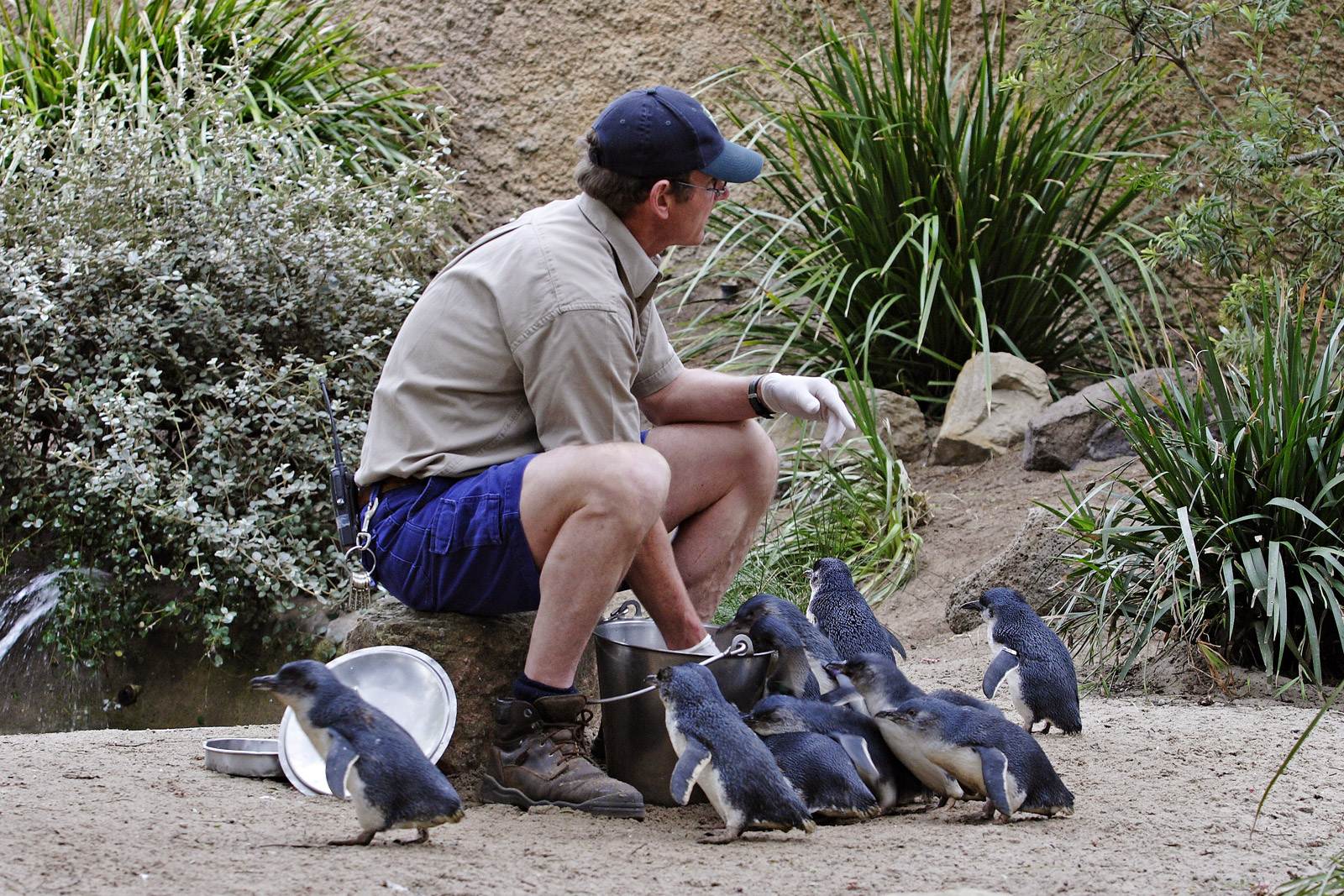
Feeding time at Melbourne Zoo

Australian little penguins have long been a curiosity to humans. Captive animals are often exhibited in zoos. Over time attitudes towards penguins have evolved from direct exploitation (for meat, skins, and eggs) to the development of tourism ventures, conservation management and the protection of both birds and their habitat.

=== Direct exploitation ===
During the 19th and 20th centuries, Australian little penguins were shot for sport, killed for their skins, captured for amusement and eaten by ship-wrecked sailors and castaways to avoid starvation. Their eggs were also collected for human consumption by indigenous and non-indigenous people. In 1831, N. W. J. Robinson noted that penguins were typically soaked in water for many days to tenderise the meat before eating.

One of the colonies raided for penguin skins was Lady Julia Percy Island in Victoria. The following directions for preparing penguin skin were published in The Chronicle in 1904:

'F.W.M.,' Port Lincoln. – To clean penguin skins, scrape off as much fat as you can with a blunt knife. Then peg the skin out carefully, stretching it well. Let it remain in the sun till most of the fat is dried out of it, then rub with a compound of powdered alum, salt, and pepper in about equal proportions. Continue to rub this on at intervals until the skin becomes soft and pliable.

An Australian taxidermist was once commissioned to make a woman's hat for a cocktail party from the remains of a dead little penguin. The newspaper described it as "a smart little toque of white and black feathers, with black flippers set at a jaunty angle on the crown."

In the 20th century, little penguins were maliciously attacked by humans, used as bait to catch southern rock lobster, used to free snagged fishing tackle, killed as incidental bycatch by fishermen using nets, and killed by vehicle strikes on roads and on the water. However, towards the end of the 20th century and the beginning of the 21st, more mutually beneficial relationships between penguins and humans developed. The sites of some breeding colonies have become carefully managed tourist destinations which provide an economic boost for coastal and island communities in Australia and New Zealand. These locations also often provide facilities and volunteer staff to support population surveys, habitat improvement works and little penguin research programs.

=== Tourism ===
At Phillip Island, Victoria, a viewing area has been established at the Phillip Island Nature Park to allow visitors to view the nightly "penguin parade". Lights and concrete stands have been erected to allow visitors to see but not photograph or film the birds (this is because it can blind or scare them) interacting in their colony. In 1987, more international visitors viewed the penguins coming ashore at Phillip Island than visited Uluru. In the financial year 1985–86, 350,000 people saw the event, and at that time audience numbers were growing 12% annually.

In Bicheno, Tasmania, evening penguin viewing tours are offered by a local tour operator at a rookery on private land. A similar sunset tour is offered at Low Head, near the mouth of the Tamar River on Tasmania's north coast. Observation platforms exist near some of Tasmania's other little penguin colonies, including Stanley, Bruny Island and Lillico Beach near Devonport.

South of Perth, Western Australia, visitors to Penguin Island may encounter wild penguins ashore in their natural habitat. The island is accessible via a short passenger ferry ride, and visitors depart the island before dusk to protect the colony from disturbance.

Visitors to Kangaroo Island, South Australia, have nightly opportunities to observe penguins at the Kangaroo Island Marine Centre in Kingscote and at the Penneshaw Penguin Centre. Granite Island at Victor Harbor, South Australia continues to offer guided tours at dusk, despite its colony dropping from thousands in the 1990s to dozens in 2014. There is also a Penguin Centre located on the island where the penguins can be viewed in captivity.

In the Otago, New Zealand town of Oamaru, visitors view the birds returning to their colony at dusk. In Oamaru it is common for penguins to nest within the cellars and foundations of local shorefront properties, especially in the old historic precinct of the town. Little penguin viewing facilities have been established at Pilots Beach on the Otago Peninsula in Dunedin. Here visitors are guided by volunteer wardens to watch penguins returning to their burrows at dusk.

=== Mascots and logos ===
Linus Torvalds, the original creator of Linux (a popular operating system kernel), was once pecked by an Australian little penguin while on holiday in Australia. Reportedly, this encounter encouraged Torvalds to select Tux as the official Linux mascot.

A Linux kernel programming challenge called the Eudyptula Challenge has attracted thousands of persons; its creator(s) use the name "Little Penguin".

Penny the Little Penguin was the mascot for the 2007 FINA World Swimming Championships held in Melbourne, Victoria.

== Threats ==
=== Introduced predators ===
Introduced mammalian predators present the greatest terrestrial risk to little penguins and include cats, dogs, rats, foxes, ferrets, and stoats. Significant dog attacks have been recorded at the colony at Little Kaiteretere Beach, and a suspected stoat or ferret attack at Doctor's Point near Dunedin, New Zealand, claimed the lives of 29 little blue penguins in November 2014.

==== Dogs and cats ====
Uncontrolled dogs or feral cats can have sudden and severe impacts on penguin colonies (more than the penguin's natural predators) and may kill many individuals. Examples of colonies affected by dog attacks include Manly, New South Wales, Penneshaw, South Australia, Red Chapel Beach, Wynyard, Camdale and Low Head in Tasmania, Penguin Island in Western Australia, and Little Kaiteretere Beach in New Zealand. Paw prints at an attack site at Freeman's Knob, Encounter Bay, South Australia showed that the dog responsible was small, roughly the size of a terrier. The single attack may have rendered the small colony extinct. Cats have been recorded preying on penguin chicks at Emu Bay on Kangaroo Island in South Australia. In October 2011, 15 dead penguin chicks were found near the Kingscote colony with their heads removed. A dog or cat attack was presumed to be the cause of death. A similar event also occurred in 2010.

The threat of dog and cat attack is ongoing at many colonies and reports of dog attacks on penguins date back to the mid 20th century. In the first seven months of 2014, South Australian animal rescue organisation AMWRRO received and treated 22 penguins that had been injured during dog attacks.

==== Foxes ====
Foxes have been known to prey on little penguins since at least the early 20th century. A fox was believed responsible for the deaths of 53 little penguins over several nights on Granite Island in 1994. Little penguins on Middle Island off Warrnambool, Victoria have suffered heavy predation by foxes, which were able to reach the island at low tide by a tidal sand bridge. The small colony was reduced from approximately 600 penguins in 2001 to less than 10 in 2005. The use of Maremma sheepdogs to guard the colony has helped it recover to 100 birds by 2017. In June 2015, 26 penguins from the Manly colony were killed in 11 days. A fox believed responsible was eventually shot in the area and an autopsy was expected to prove or disprove its involvement. In November 2015 a fox entered the little penguin enclosure at the Melbourne Zoo and killed 14 penguins, prompting measures to further "fox proof" the enclosure.

==== Other animals ====
A suspected stoat or ferret attack at Doctor's Point near Dunedin, New Zealand, claimed the lives of 29 little blue penguins in November 2014. A population of Tasmanian devils introduced to Maria Island in 2012 for conservation reasons led to the loss of the local little penguin colony.

=== Oil spills ===
Oil spills can be lethal for penguins and other sea birds and events related ports and shipping have impacted penguins across the Southern Hemisphere since the 1920s. Oil is toxic when ingested and penguins' buoyancy and the insulative quality of their plumage is damaged by contact with oil. Little penguin populations have been significantly affected during two major oil spills at sea: the Iron Baron oil spill off Tasmania's north coast in 1995 and the grounding of the Rena off New Zealand in 2011. In 2005, a 10-year post-mortem reflection on the Iron Baron incident estimated penguin fatalities at 25,000. The Rena incident killed 2,000 seabirds (including little penguins) directly, and killed an estimated 20,000 in total based on wider ecosystem impacts.

Victoria's coastline has been subjected to chronic oil contamination from minor discharges or spills which have impacted little penguins at several colonies. An oil spill or dumping event claimed the lives of up to 120 little penguins which were found oiled, deceased and ashore near Warrnambool in 1990. A further 104 penguins were taken into care for cleaning. The waters west of Cape Otway were polluted with bunker oil. The source was unknown at the time and an investigation was started into three potentially responsible vessels.

Earlier oil spill or oil dumping events have injured or killed little penguins at various locations in the 1920s, 1930s, 1940s, 1950s, 1960s and 1970s. The threat persists in the 21st century, with oiled birds received for treatment at specialised facilities like AMWRRO in South Australia. Oil spills are the most common cause of the little penguins being admitted to the rehabilitation facilities at Phillip Island Nature Park (PINP). These oil spill recurrences have endangered not just the little penguins, but the entire penguin population. This can further decline the population, which can lead to possible extinction.

=== Fire ===
Increased frequency of drought and extreme temperatures in Southern Australia has led to an increased fire risk. Being flightless birds that nest on land, little blue penguins are especially vulnerable to fire. Behavioural traits such as reluctancy to abandon nests and emerging mostly during daylit hours is thought to be some of the main reasons for increased vulnerability in the future. The threats it provides include nest and habitat distruption, as well as deadly to eggs and individuals, despite this Eudyptula minor appears to show no fear towards fire when directly exposed. When observed, they have been to found to remain around or under vegetation until severely burnt or injured. Some have even been observed preening their feathers near to open flames.

Fires can also significantly alter the composition of vegetation in Eudyptula minor habitats. A large fire in Marion Bay, South Australia in 1994 saw the loss of two key plant species; introduced marram grass Ammophila and coastal wattle A. sophorae. Following the fire, these grasses were replaced by invasive palms A. arenia and A. sophoraegrew back in dense thickets. This habitat became no longer suitable for Eudyptula minor and colony relocated.

=== Human development ===
The impacts of human habitation in proximity to little penguin colonies include collisions with vehicles, direct harassment, burning and clearing of vegetation and housing development. In 1950, roughly a hundred little penguins were allegedly burned to death near The Nobbies at Port Phillip Bay during a grass fire lit intentionally by a grazier for land management purposes. It was later reported that the figure had been overstated. The matter was resolved when the grazier offered to return land to the custody of the State for the future protection of the colony.

A study in Perth from 2003 to 2012 found that the main cause of mortality was trauma, most likely from watercraft, leading to a recommendation for management strategies to avoid watercraft strikes. The Conservation Council of Western Australia has expressed opposition to the proposed development of a marina and canals at Mangles Bay, in close proximity to penguin colonies at Penguin Island and Garden Island. Researcher Belinda Cannell of Murdoch University found that over a quarter of penguins found dead in the area had been killed by boats. Carcasses had been found with heads, flippers or feet cut off, cuts on their backs and ruptured organs. The development would increase boat traffic and result in more penguin deaths.

=== Human interference ===
Penguins are vulnerable to interference by humans, especially while they are ashore during moult or nesting periods.

In 1930 in Tasmania, it was believed that little penguins were competing with short-tailed shearwaters, which were being commercially exploited. An "open season" in which penguins would be permitted to be killed was planned in response to requests from members of the mutton-birding industry. In the 1930s, an arsonist was believed to have started a fire on Rabbit Island near Albany, Western Australia- a known little penguin rookery. Visitors later reported finding dead penguins there with their feet burned off. In 1938 an account was given of a little penguin found with its flippers tied together with fishing line.

In 1949, penguins on Phillip Island in Victoria became victims of human cruelty, with some kicked and others thrown off a cliff and shot at. These acts of cruelty prompted the state government to fence off the rookeries. In 1973, ten dead penguins and fifteen young seagulls were found dead on Wright Island in Encounter Bay, South Australia. It was believed that they were killed by people poking sticks down burrows before scattering the dead bodies around, though a dog attack is also possible. In 1983 one penguin was found dead and another injured at Encounter Bay, both by human interference. The injured bird was euthanased.

More recent examples of destructive interference can be found at Granite Island, where in 1994 a penguin chick was taken from a burrow and abandoned on the mainland, a burrow containing penguin chicks was trampled and litter was discarded down active burrows. In 1998, two incidents in six months resulted in penguin deaths. The latter, which occurred in May, saw 13 penguins apparently kicked to death. In March 2016, two little penguins were kicked and attacked by humans during separate incidents at the St Kilda colony, Victoria.

In 2018, a dozen little penguin carcasses were found in a garbage bin at Low Head, Tasmania prompting an investigation into the causes of death. Also in 2018, 20-year-old Tasmanian man Joshua Leigh Jeffrey was fined $82.50 in court costs and sentenced to 49 hours of community service at Burnie Magistrates Court after killing nine little penguins at Sulphur Creek in North West Tasmania on 1 January 2016 by beating them with a stick. Dr Eric Woehler from conservation group Birds Tasmania denounced the perceived leniency of the sentence, which he said placed minimal value on Tasmania's wildlife and set an "unwelcome precedent". Following an appeal by prosecutors, Jeffrey had his sentence doubled on 15 October 2018. The office of the Director of Public Prosecutions said it considered the original sentence to be manifestly inadequate. The original sentence was set aside, and Jeffrey was sentenced to two months in prison, suspended on the condition of him committing no offences for a year that are punishable by imprisonment. His community order was also doubled to 98 hours.

=== Interactions with fishing ===
Some little penguins are drowned when amateur fishermen set gill nets near penguin colonies. Discarded fishing line can also present an entanglement risk and contact can result in physical injury, reduced mobility or drowning. In 2014, a group of 25 dead little penguins was found on Altona Beach in Victoria. Necropsies concluded that the animals had died after becoming entangled in net fishing equipment, prompting community calls for a ban on net fishing in Port Phillip Bay.

In the 20th century, little penguins were intentionally shot or caught by fishermen to use as bait in pots for catching Southern rock lobster (also known as crayfish) or by line fishermen. Colonies were targeted for this purpose in various parts of Tasmania including Bruny Island and at West Island, South Australia.

=== Plastic pollution ===
Plastics are swallowed by Australian little penguins, who mistake them for prey items. They present a choking hazard and also occupy space in the animal's stomach. Indigestible material in a penguin's stomach can contribute to malnutrition or starvation. Other larger plastic items, such as bottle packaging rings, can become entangled around penguins' necks, affecting their mobility.

=== Mass mortalities ===
A mass mortality event occurred in Port Phillip Bay in March 1935. The event coincided with moulting and deaths were attributed to fatigue. Another event occurred at Phillip Island in Victoria in 1940. The population there was believed to have fallen from 2,000 birds to 200. Dead birds were allegedly in healthy-looking condition, so speculation pointed to a disease or pathogen.

Oil spills resulting from shipping activity have occasionally resulted in mass mortalities of Australian little penguins. The worst of these was the Iron Baron oil spill at Low Head, Tasmania, in 1995, followed by the Rena oil spill in New Zealand in 2011.

Citizens have raised concerns about mass mortality of penguins, alleging a lack of official interest in the subject. Discoveries of dead penguins in Australia should be reported to the corresponding state's environment department. In South Australia, a mortality register was established in 2011.

In 2026 due to the introduction and subsequent spread of H5N1 in Australia, Victoria announced that they would utilise the state's priority vaccines in order to vaccinate the St. Kilda & Phillip Island little penguin populations. Prior to the commencement of vaccination, on 15 August 2026, a penguin in the Phillip Island colony was found deceased from H5N1. A professor in wildlife ecology and conservation at Deakin University said the detection of H5 bird flu in the little penguin population was "devastating".

== Conservation ==
Eudyptula species are classified as "at risk – declining" under New Zealand's Wildlife Act 1953. Overall, little penguin populations in New Zealand have been decreasing. Some colonies have become extinct, and others continue to be at risk. Some new colonies have been established in urban areas. The species is not considered endangered in New Zealand, with the exception of the white-flippered subspecies found only on Banks Peninsula and nearby Motunau Island. Since the 1960s, the mainland population has declined by 60–70%; though a small increase has occurred on Motunau Island. A colony exists in Wellington Harbour on Matiu / Somes Island.

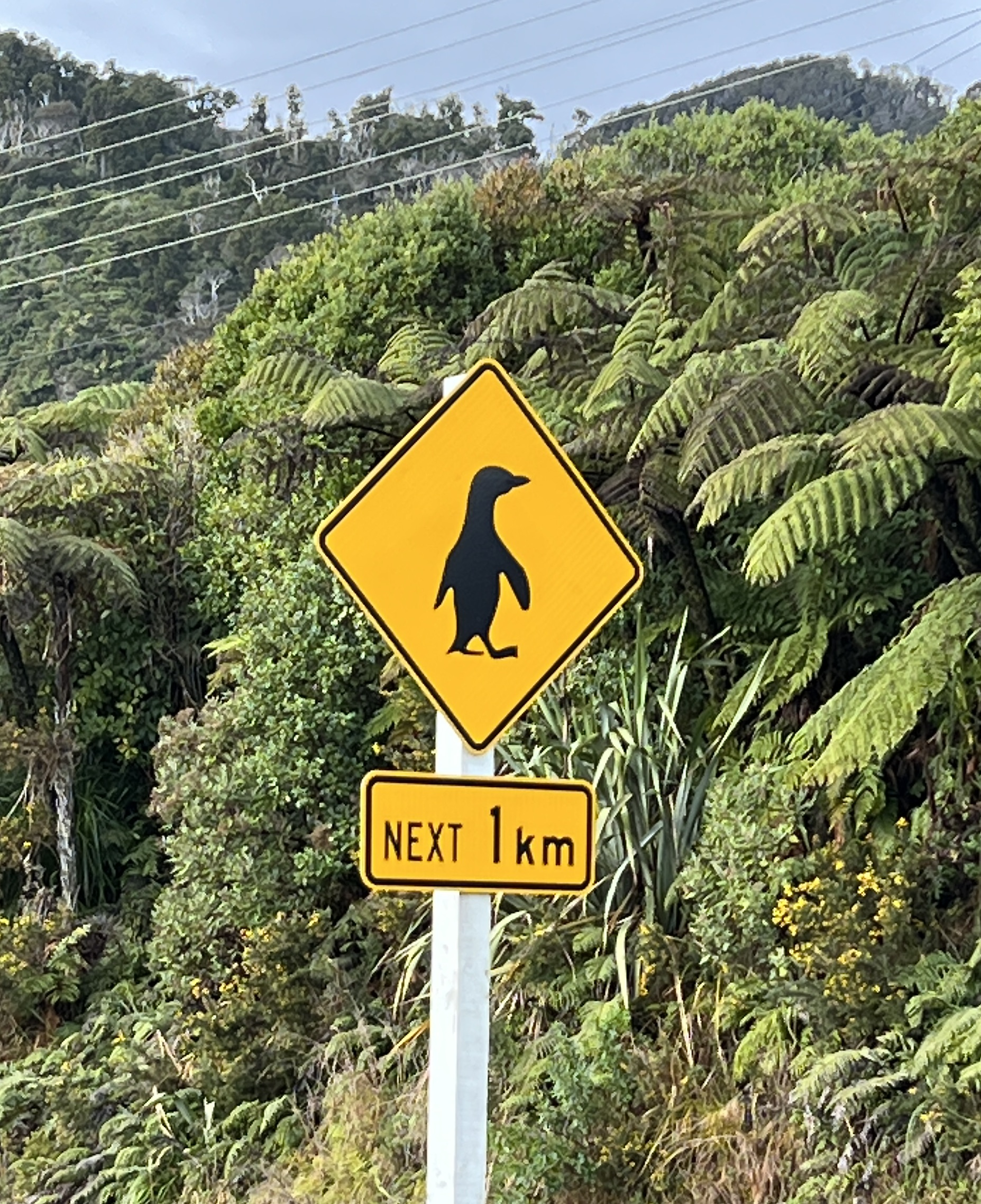
Traffic sign warning of little penguins crossing on the West Coast of New Zealand

Protestors have opposed the development of a marina at Kennedy Point, Waiheke Island in New Zealand for the risk it poses to little penguins and their habitat. Protesters claimed that they exhausted all legal means to oppose the project and have had to resort to occupation and non-violent resistance. Several arrests were made for trespassing. Construction of the marina was upheld by the Environment Court in 2012 and completed in 2022. Since the completion of the construction, little penguin burrows have still been found in the area, as well as one dead little penguin on the boat ramp there.

The West Coast Penguin Trust and DOC have worked in collaboration to maintain data on penguin mortality, the West Coast South Island colonies are highlighted as one of the Eudyptula minor colonies currently facing decline The data shows highest level of penguin mortality is caused by roadkill, likely due to many of the colonies being close to coastal highway. To mitigate this issue, a penguin-proof fence was erected in 2019 across 3.3 km (2.1 mi) of highway where road kill was most prevalent, no roadkill deaths have been recorded since its implementation

The risk of fire damage to habitats in Philip Island has been partially mitigated through the planting of fire-resistant indigenous vegetation in and around the nesting sites. Thus far this planting has occurred primarily in the <10% of the colony most visible from tourist look-out points

In New South Wales, Eudyptula minor was listed as an endangered species in 1997 under the Endangered Species Act 1995. Since then conservation efforts such as public education, nest monitoring and labelling it as "critical habitat" were implemented. Despite these efforts, this mainland colony was met with additional challenges from threats from wild dogs and foxes, to lack of available local prey. The species is now listed as at-risk declining under the same act.

In general, the Eudyptula species are protected from various threats under different legislation in different jurisdictions:

Little penguin protection legislation by region
Location	Status	Register or legislation
Australia (Commonwealth waters)	Listed marine species.	Environment Protection Biodiversity Conservation (EPBC) Act 1999
Western Australia	Protected fauna.	Wildlife Conservation Act 1950
South Australia	Protected animal. Mandatory reporting for fisheries interactions.	National Parks & Wildlife Act 1972 Fisheries Management Act 2007
Victoria	Protected wildlife. Mandatory reporting for fisheries interactions.	Wildlife Act 1975 Flora and Fauna Guarantee Act 1988
Tasmania	Protected wildlife. Penguins declared "sensitive wildlife" and some colony sites declared "sensitive areas".	National Parks and Wildlife Act 1970 Dog Control Act 2000
New South Wales	Threatened species (Manly colony only) . Manly colony declared "Critical Habitat".	Biodiversity Conservation Act 2016 Threatened Species Conservation Act 1995
New Zealand	At risk – declining.	Wildlife Act 1953

=== Management of introduced predators ===
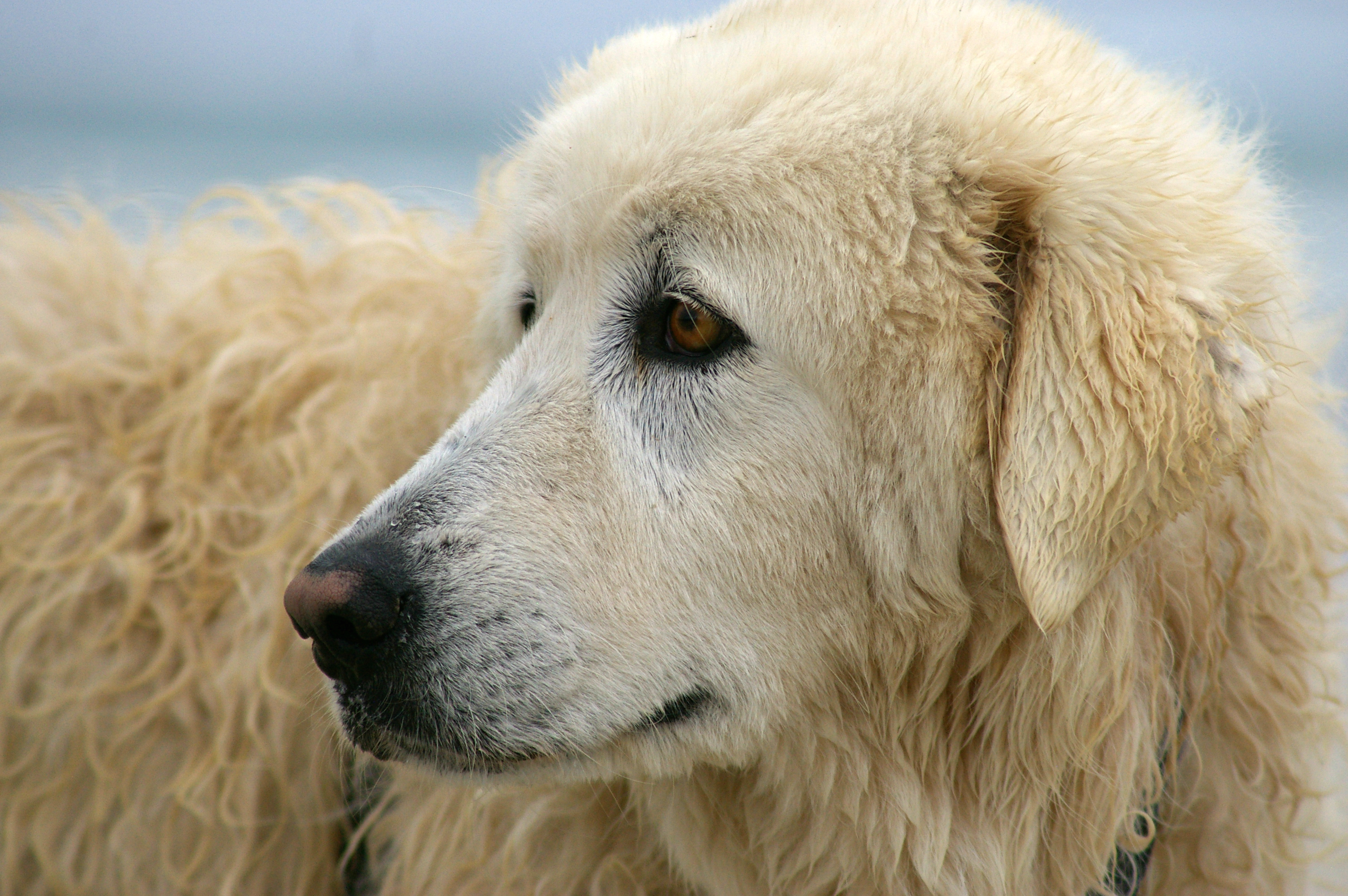
Maremma sheepdogs are used to protect Little penguin habitat in Victoria.

Management strategies to mitigate the risk of domestic and feral dog and cats attack include establishing dog-free zones near penguin colonies and introducing regulations to ensure dogs to remain on leashes at all times in adjacent areas.

The threat of colony collapse at Warrnambool prompted conservationists to pioneer the experimental use of Maremma Sheepdogs to protect the colony and fend off would-be predators. The deployment of sheepdogs to protect the penguin colony has deterred the foxes and enabled the penguin population to rebound. This is in addition to the support from groups of volunteers who work to protect the penguins from attack at night. The first Maremma sheepdog to prove the concept was Oddball, whose story inspired a feature film of the same name, released in 2015. In December 2015, the BBC reported, "The current dogs patrolling Middle Island are Eudy and Tula, named after the scientific term for the fairy penguin: Eudyptula. They are the sixth and seventh dogs to be used and a new puppy is being trained up [...] to start work in 2016". Tula retired in 2019 after nine years of service, and her sister Eudy later died at age 12 in 2021. As of 2019, Tula is helping protect farm chickens and training younger guardian dogs.

In Sydney, professional hunters have been used to protect a colony of Australian little penguins. This effort is in addition to support from local volunteers who work to protect the penguins from attack at night. In 2019 it was announced that the defensive strategies were paying off and that Manly colony was recovering.

Near some colonies in Tasmania, traps are set and feral cats that are captured are euthanised.

=== Habitat restoration ===
Several efforts have been made to improve breeding sites on Kangaroo Island, including augmenting habitat with artificial burrows and revegetation work. The Knox School's habitat restoration efforts were filmed and broadcast in 2008 by Totally Wild.

In 2019, concrete nesting "huts" were made for the little penguins of Lion Island in the mouth of the Hawkesbury River in New South Wales, Australia. The island had been ravaged by a fire which began with a lightning strike and destroyed 85% of the penguin's natural habitat.

Weed control undertaken by the Friends of Five Islands in New South Wales helps improve prospects of breeding success for seabirds, including the little penguin. The main problem species on the Five Islands are kikuyu grass and coastal morning glory. The weeding work has resulted in increasing numbers of little penguin burrows in the areas weeded and the return of the white-faced storm petrel to the island after a 56-year breeding absence.

=== Oil spill response ===
Penguins are taken into care and cleaned by trained staff at specialised facilities when they are found alive in an oiled condition. When animals are first received at Phillip Island's rehabilitation facility, a knitted penguin sweater, made to a specific pattern, is applied to the bird. The sweater prevents the bird from attempting to preen off the oil itself. Once the birds have been treated and cleaned, the jumper is discarded. In 2019, the Phillip Island centre put out a call for 1,400 new penguin jumpers to be knitted after they increased the carrying capacity of their treatment facility. The last major oil spill the centre responded to saw 438 birds cleaned with a 96% survival rate after rehabilitation. The Melbourne Zoo also treats and rehabilitates oiled little penguins, and the Taronga Zoo has been cleaning and rehabilitating oiled penguins since the 1950s.

== Zoological exhibits ==
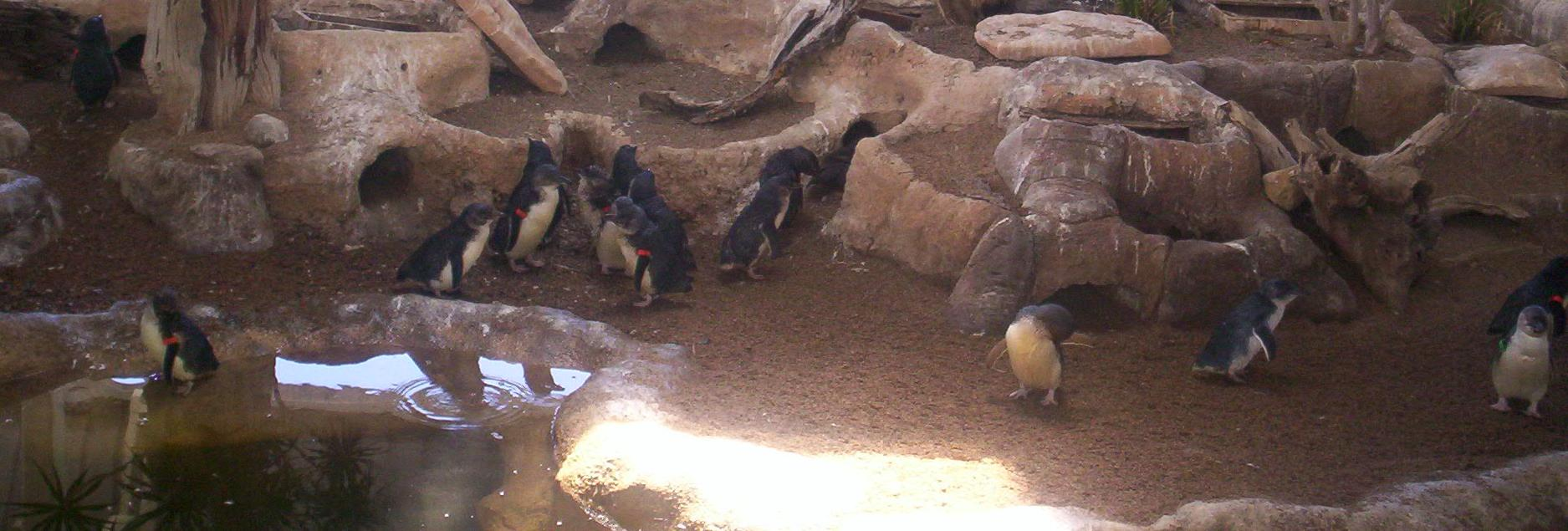
Little penguins at Sea World, Gold Coast, Queensland, Australia (photo 2005)

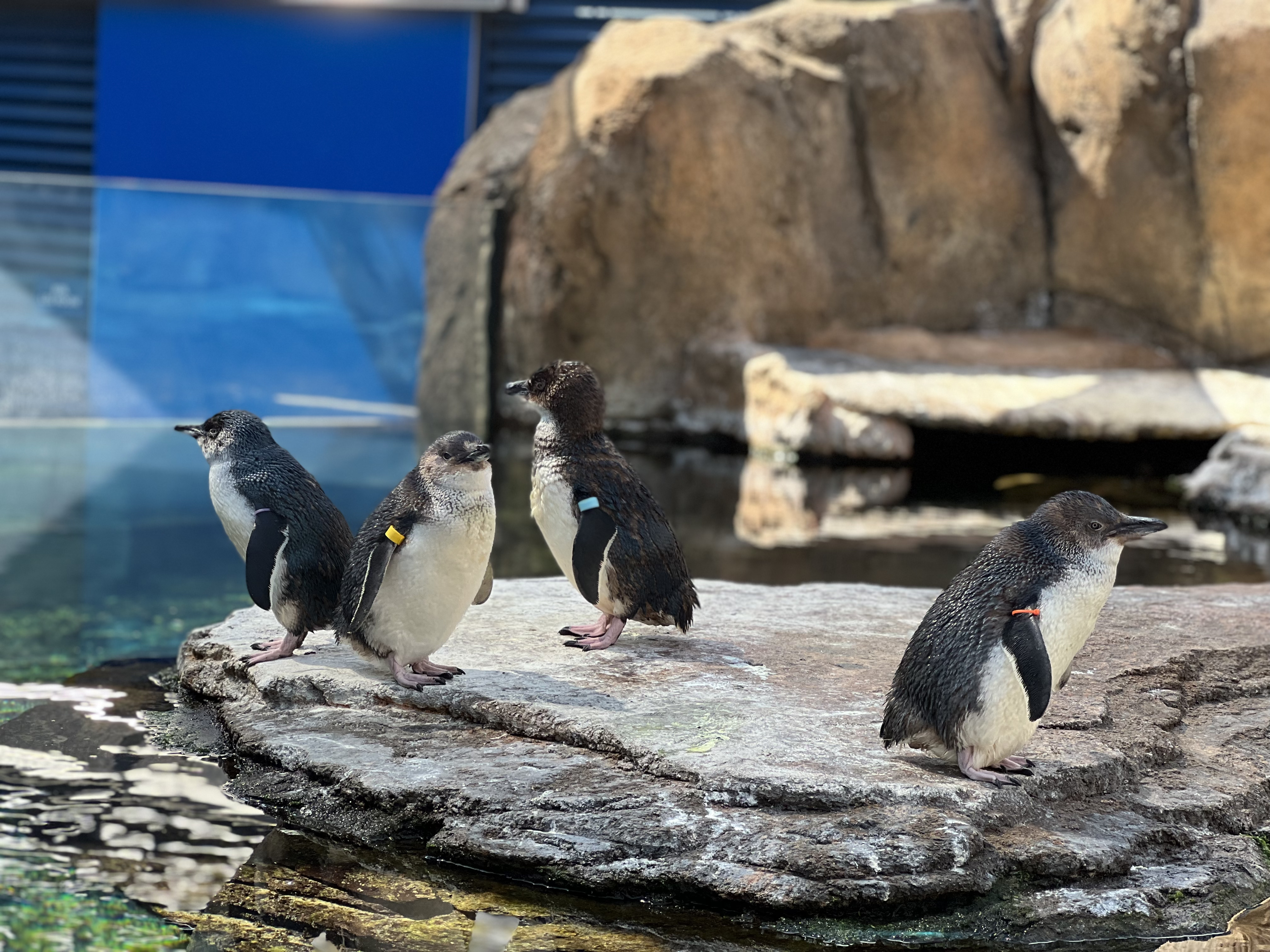
Little penguins at Birch Aquarium, La Jolla

Zoological exhibits featuring purpose-built enclosures for Eudyptula species can be seen in Australia at the Adelaide Zoo, Melbourne Zoo, the National Zoo & Aquarium in Canberra, Perth Zoo, Caversham Wildlife Park (Perth), Ballarat Wildlife Park, Sea Life Sydney Aquarium, and the Taronga Zoo in Sydney. Enclosures include nesting boxes or similar structures for the animals to retire into, a reconstruction of a pool and in some cases, a transparent aquarium wall to allow patrons to view the animals underwater while they swim.

Eudyptula penguin exhibit exists at Sea World, on the Gold Coast, Queensland, Australia. In early March 2007, 25 of the 37 penguins died from an unknown toxin following a change of gravel in their enclosure. It is still not known what caused the deaths of the penguins, and it was decided not to return the 12 surviving penguins to the same enclosure where the penguins became ill. A new enclosure for the little penguin colony was opened at Sea World in 2008.

In New Zealand, Eudyptula penguin exhibits exist at the Auckland Zoo, the Wellington Zoo, the International Antarctic Centre and the National Aquarium of New Zealand. Since 2017, the National Aquarium of New Zealand, has featured a monthly "Penguin of the Month" board, declaring two of their resident animals the "Naughty" and "Nice" penguin for that month. Photos of the board have gone viral and gained the aquarium a large worldwide social media following.

In the United States, Eudyptula penguins can be seen at the Louisville Zoo the Bronx Zoo, Albuquerque Zoo, and the Cincinnati Zoo.

== See also ==
- Smallest organisms
