= Venezuelan herring =

Conservation status
- Data Deficient (IUCN 3.1)

Scientific classification
- Kingdom: Animalia
- Phylum: Chordata
- Class: Actinopterygii
- Order: Clupeiformes
- Family: Spratelloididae
- Genus: Jenkinsia
- Species: J. parvula

Binomial name
- Jenkinsia parvula Cervigón & Velazquez, 1978

Species of fish

The Venezuelan herring (Jenkinsia parvula) is a species of fish in the family Spratelloididae, the small round herrings. It is endemic to the coastal waters of Venezuela.
