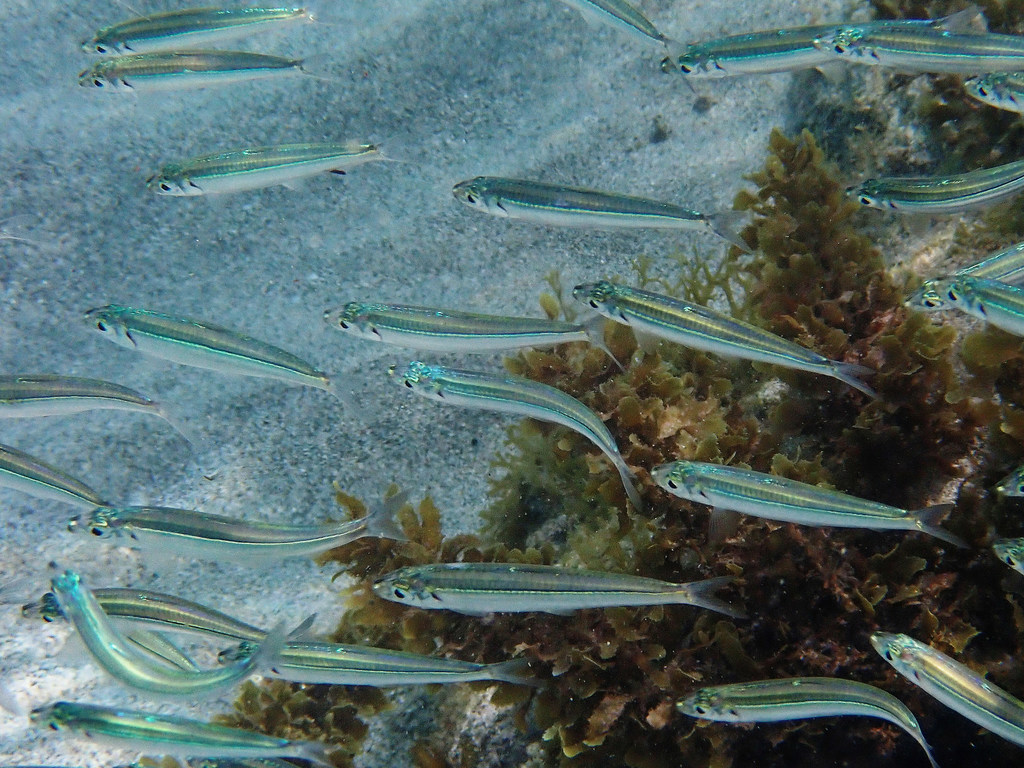

Conservation status
- Least Concern (IUCN 3.1)

Scientific classification
- Kingdom: Animalia
- Phylum: Chordata
- Class: Actinopterygii
- Order: Clupeiformes
- Family: Spratelloididae
- Genus: Jenkinsia
- Species: J. lamprotaenia

Binomial name
- Jenkinsia lamprotaenia (Gosse, 1851)

Synonyms
- Clupea lamprotaenia Gosse, 1851; Stolephorus viridis T. H. Bean, 1912; Jenkinsia viridis (T. H. Bean, 1912); Jenkinsia bermudana Rivas, 1946

= Dwarf round herring =

Species of fish

The dwarf round herring (Jenkinsia lamprotaenia) is a marine species of fish in the family Spratelloididae. It is found in the western-central Atlantic Ocean from Bermuda and the Gulf of Mexico south to Tobago. The species is both edible and used as live bait.

== Description ==
The dwarf round herring can grow to a recorded maximum length of 7.5 cm (2.9 inches). They live in inshore area of 0 - 50 m depth under water in schools. The fish is greyish-green by colour and feeds on zooplankton.
