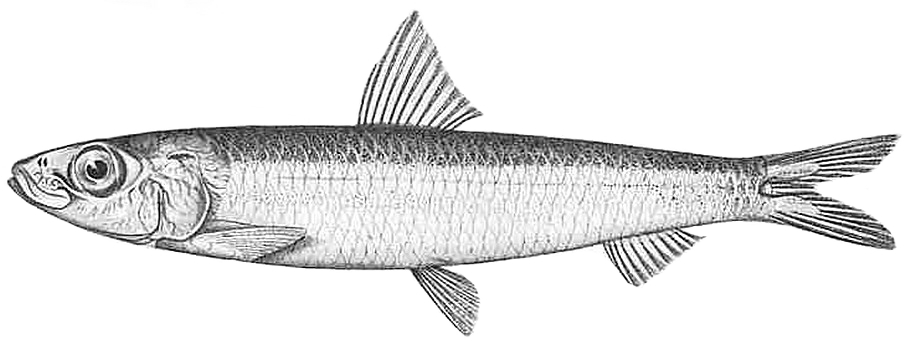

Conservation status
- Least Concern (IUCN 3.1)

Scientific classification
- Kingdom: Animalia
- Phylum: Chordata
- Class: Actinopterygii
- Order: Clupeiformes
- Family: Spratelloididae
- Genus: Spratelloides
- Species: S. robustus

Binomial name
- Spratelloides robustus J. D. Ogilby, 1897

= Spratelloides robustus =

Species of fish

Spratelloides robustus, the blue sprat, also known as the fringe-scale round herring, blue bait or blue sardine, is a type of sprat fish.

== Description and behavior ==
The Spratelloides robustus has no spine, but has 10–14 Dorsal soft rays, 9–14 Anal soft rays, and 46–47 vertebrae, and a W-shaped pelvic scute. The males can grow up to 12 centimetres (0.39 ft). They are oviparous.

== Distribution and habititat ==
The Spratelloides robustus mainly lives around southern Australia, at a range from the Dampier Archipelago to the south of Queensland, including Tasmania.
