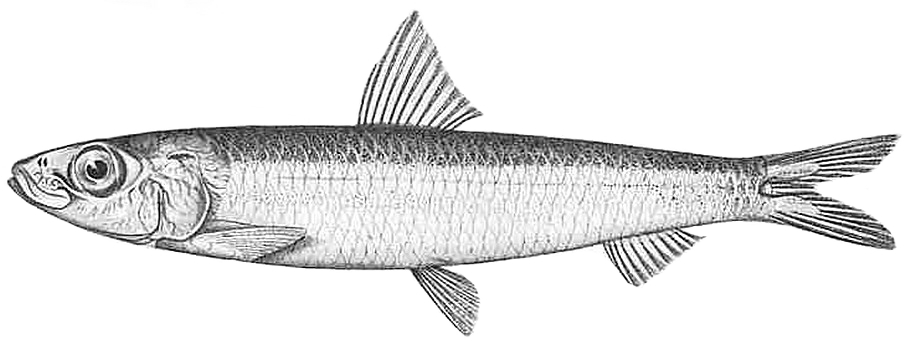
- Spratelloides robustus

Scientific classification
- Kingdom: Animalia
- Phylum: Chordata
- Class: Actinopterygii
- Order: Clupeiformes
- Family: Spratelloididae
- Genus: Spratelloides; Bleeker, 1851

= Spratelloides =

Genus of fishes

Spratelloides is a genus of fish in the family Spratelloididae. They are small fish used as fishing bait, especially in skipjack tuna-fishing. Some species are also valued as food in certain countries, like Spratelloides gracilis, known as kibinago in Japan.

== Species ==
The recognized species in this genus are:

- Spratelloides atrofasciatus L. P. Schultz, 1943 (small-banded round herring)
- Spratelloides delicatulus (E. T. Bennett, 1832) (delicate round herring)
- Spratelloides gracilis (Temminck & Schlegel, 1846) (silver-stripe round herring)
- Spratelloides lewisi Wongratana, 1983 (Lewis' round herring)
- Spratelloides robustus J. D. Ogilby, 1897 (fringe-scale round herring)
