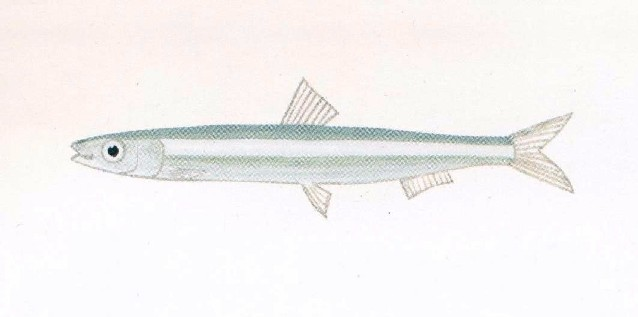

Conservation status
- Least Concern (IUCN 3.1)

Scientific classification
- Kingdom: Animalia
- Phylum: Chordata
- Class: Actinopterygii
- Division: Teleostei
- Order: Clupeiformes
- Family: Spratelloididae
- Genus: Spratelloides
- Species: S. gracilis

Binomial name
- Spratelloides gracilis (Temminck & Schlegel, 1846)

= Silver-stripe round herring =

Species of small fish

The silver-stripe round herring, slender sprat, or Kibinago minnow (Spratelloides gracilis) is a small, herring-like forage fish. They are small fish used as fishing bait, especially in skipjack tuna-fishing. It is valued as food in Japan, where it is known as kibinago. These can be eaten raw, as sashimi, or cooked, as whitebait.

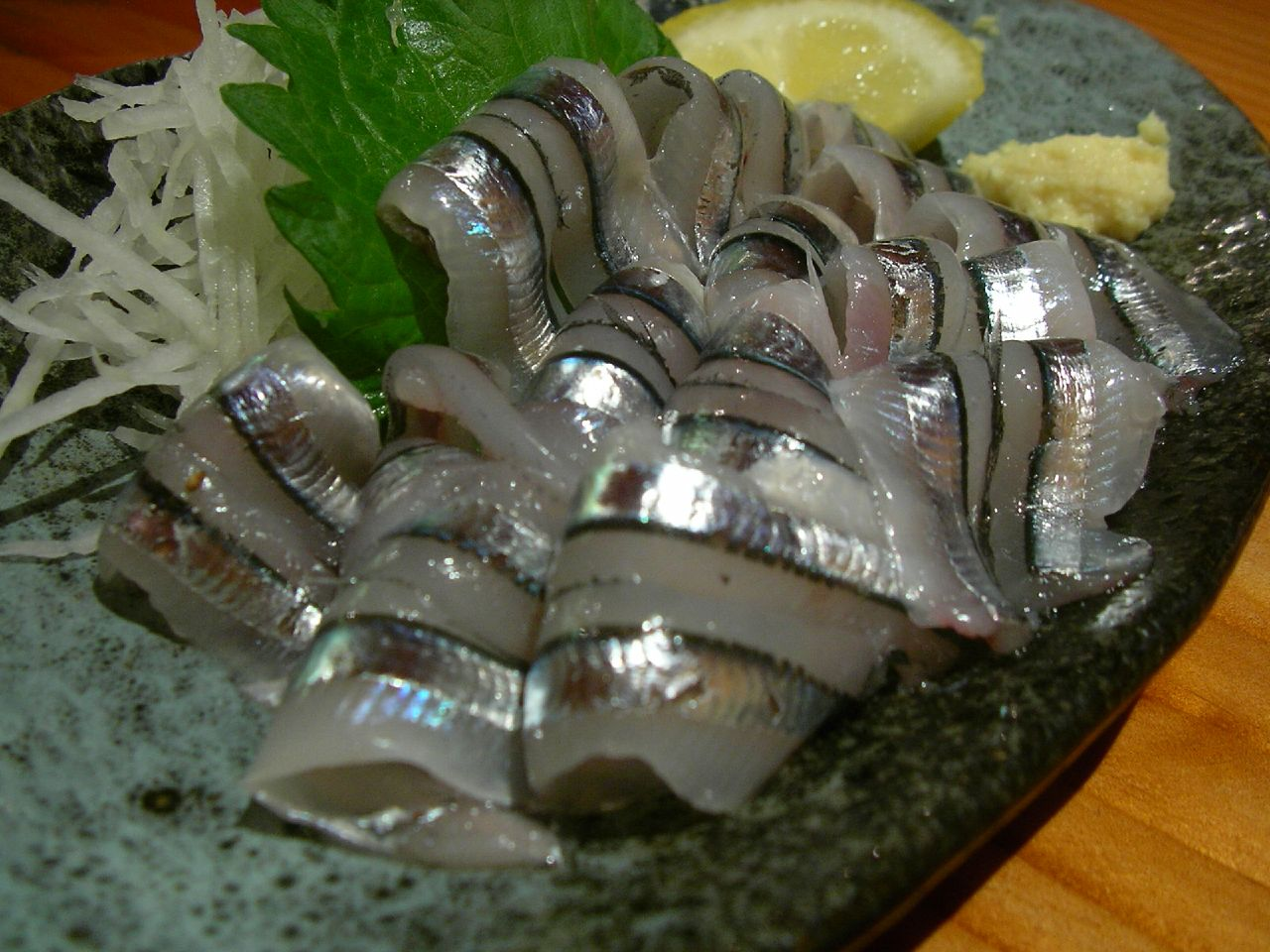
Sashimi of kibinago (silver-stripe round herring)

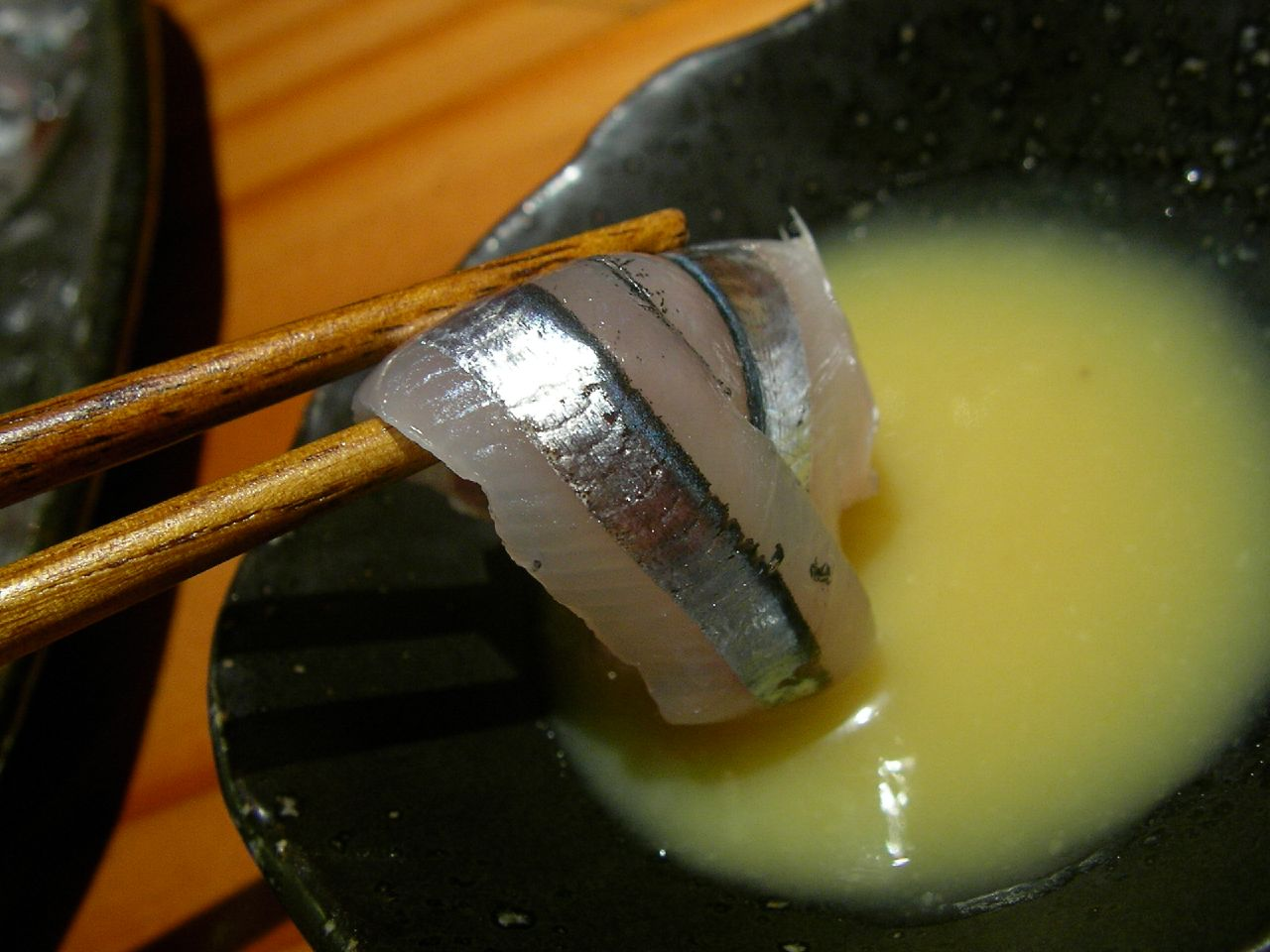
Kibinago sashimi with chopsticks

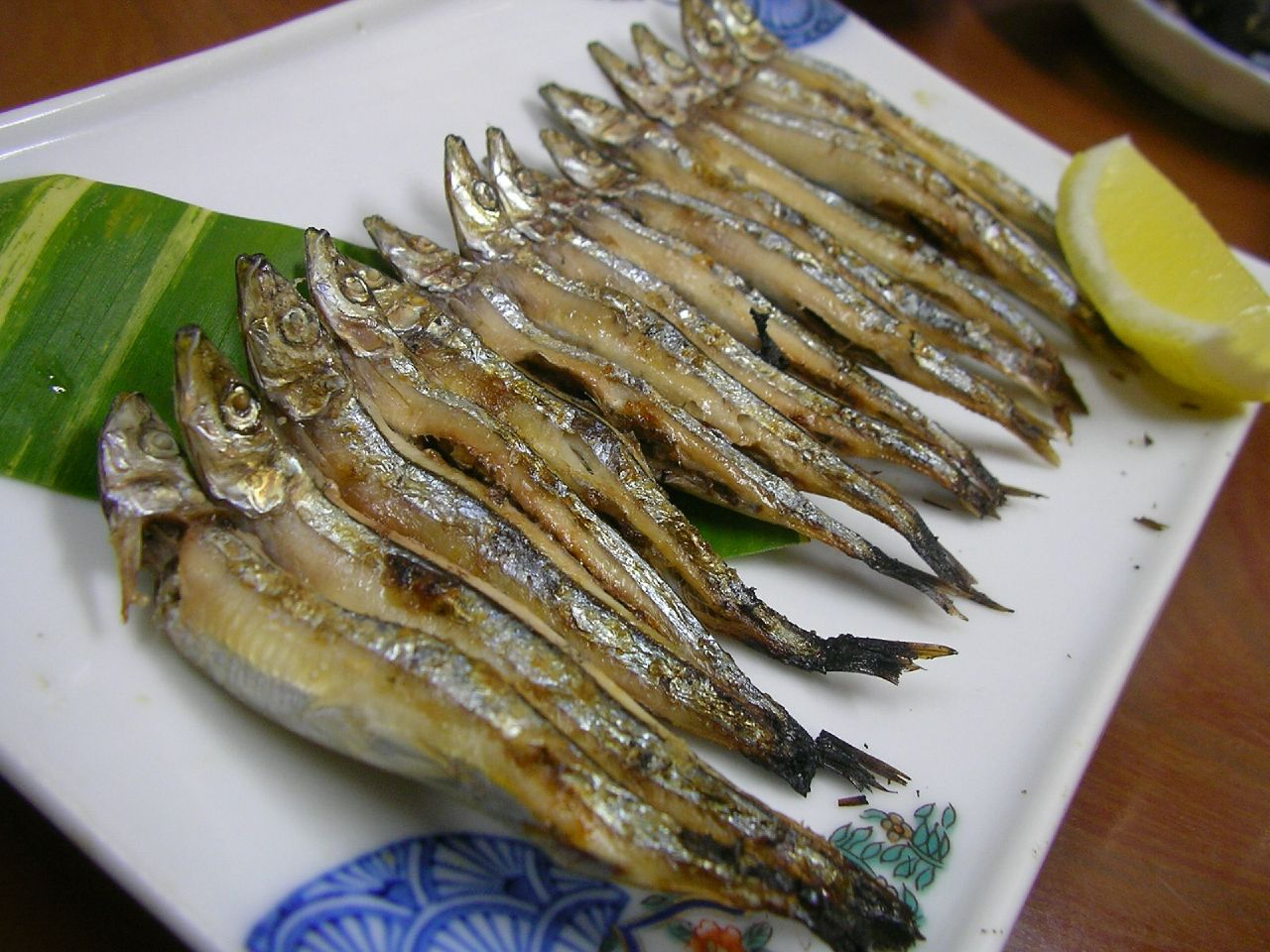
Grilled kibinago
