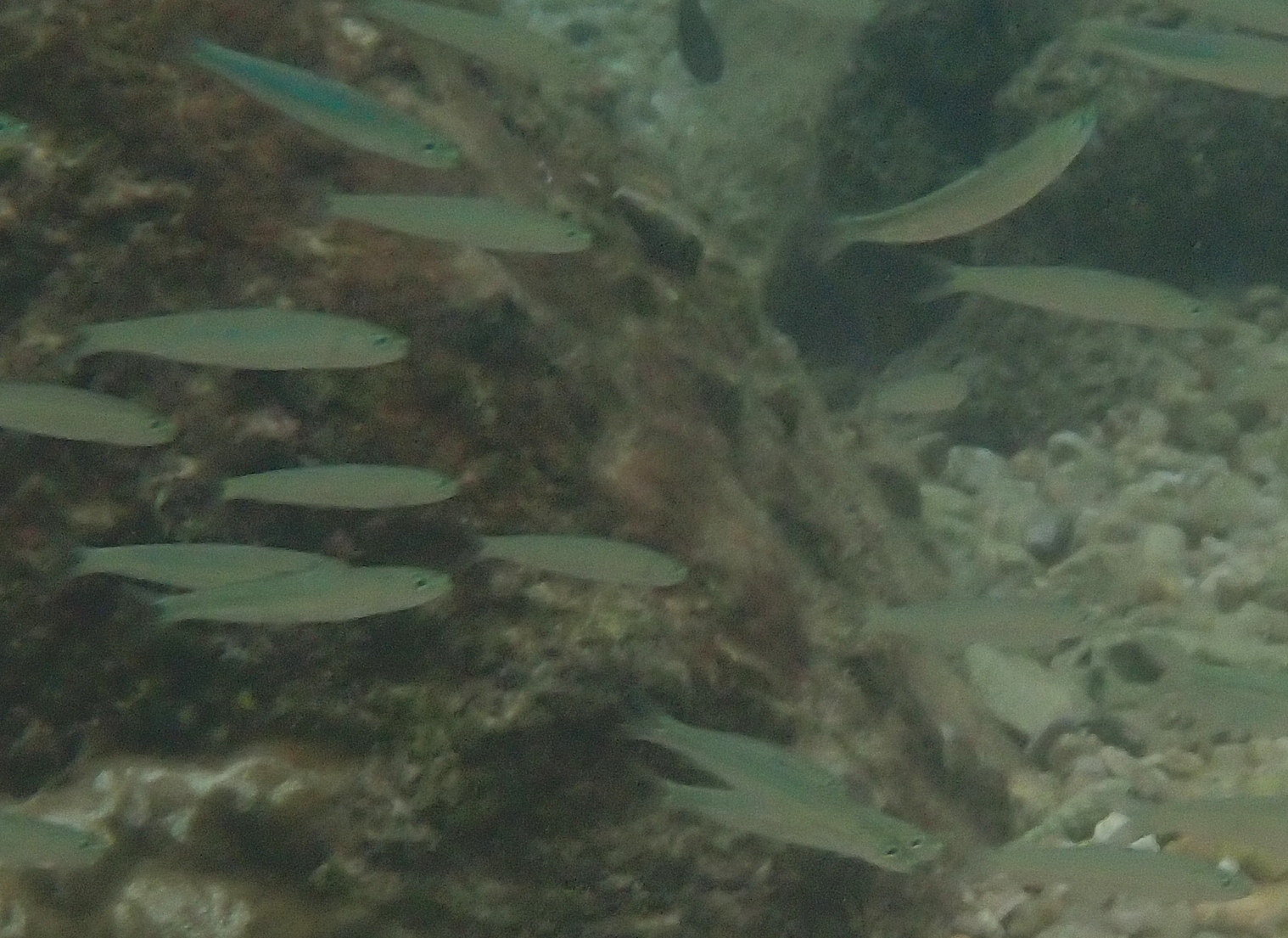

Conservation status
- Least Concern (IUCN 3.1)

Scientific classification
- Kingdom: Animalia
- Phylum: Chordata
- Class: Actinopterygii
- Order: Clupeiformes
- Family: Spratelloididae
- Genus: Spratelloides
- Species: S. delicatulus

Binomial name
- Spratelloides delicatulus (E. T. Bennett, 1832)

Synonyms
- Clupea delicatula Bennett, 1832; Stolephorus delicatulus (Bennett, 1832); Clupea macassariensis Bleeker, 1849; Alosa alburnus Kner & Steindachner, 1867

= Spratelloides delicatulus =

Species of fish

Spratelloides delicatulus, the blue sprat, also known as the delicate round herring, blueback sprat, or piha, is a species of marine ray-finned fish belonging to the family Spratelloididae, the small round herrings. This species has a wide Indo-Pacific distribution and has been recorded off Tel-Aviv on the Mediterranean coast of Israel.

== Description ==
Spratelloides delicatulus is a small, slender-bodied pelagic fish that typically reaches 5–7 cm in total length. The body is laterally compressed and silvery in color, often appearing translucent. Like other members of the order Clupeiformes, the species has a single dorsal fin and a forked caudal fin. The streamlined body shape and forked tail facilitate sustained swimming and schooling behavior in open coastal waters. Early descriptions distinguish the species from related taxa based on characteristics such as scale counts, fin placement, and proportional body measurements.

== Distribution and habitat ==
Spratelloides delicatulus occurs throughout the tropical Indo-Pacific region, including northern Australia, the Great Barrier Reef, Southeast Asia, and parts of the western Pacific. The species primarily inhabits shallow coastal waters and reef shelf environments. Populations occur both inshore and offshore across reef systems, with demographic variation observed across geographic regions.

Research on populations across the Great Barrier Reef shelf has shown differences in growth rates and reproductive timing between populations occurring at different latitudes. The species commonly forms large schools in nearshore waters where plankton productivity is high.

== Ecology and feeding ==
Spratelloides delicatulus feeds primarily on planktonic organisms in the water column. Observations have documented feeding aggregations during coral reef spawning events, including consumption of giant clam gametes. This opportunistic feeding behavior demonstrates the species’ role in reef nutrient cycling. The species also serves as an important prey item for larger predatory fishes and other marine predators.

== Human use and ecological importance ==
Although Spratelloides delicatulus is not a major target of commercial fisheries, it is commonly used as baitfish in small-scale fisheries. Ecologically, the species occupies an important trophic position by linking plankton production to higher-level predators within reef ecosystems. Its abundance and short life cycle contribute to the stability of reef-associated food webs.
