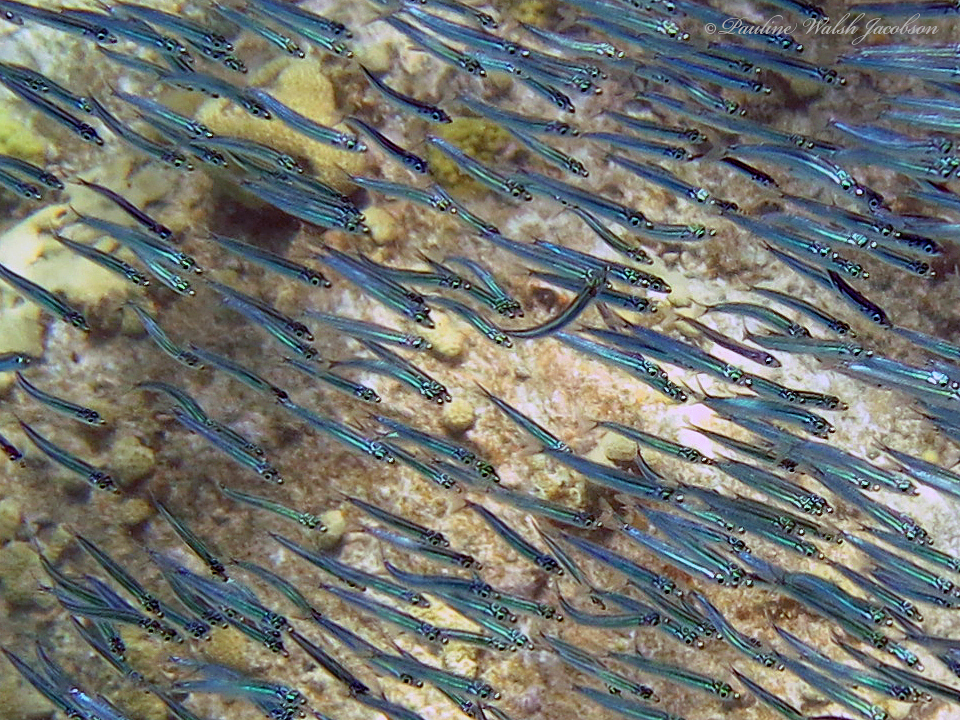
- A school of Florida round herring (J. stolifera) in the United States Virgin Islands

Scientific classification
- Domain: Eukaryota
- Kingdom: Animalia
- Phylum: Chordata
- Class: Actinopterygii
- Order: Clupeiformes
- Family: Spratelloididae
- Genus: Jenkinsia; D. S. Jordan & Evermann, 1896

Type species
- Dussumieria stolifera Jordan & Gilbert, 1884

= Jenkinsia =

Genus of fishes

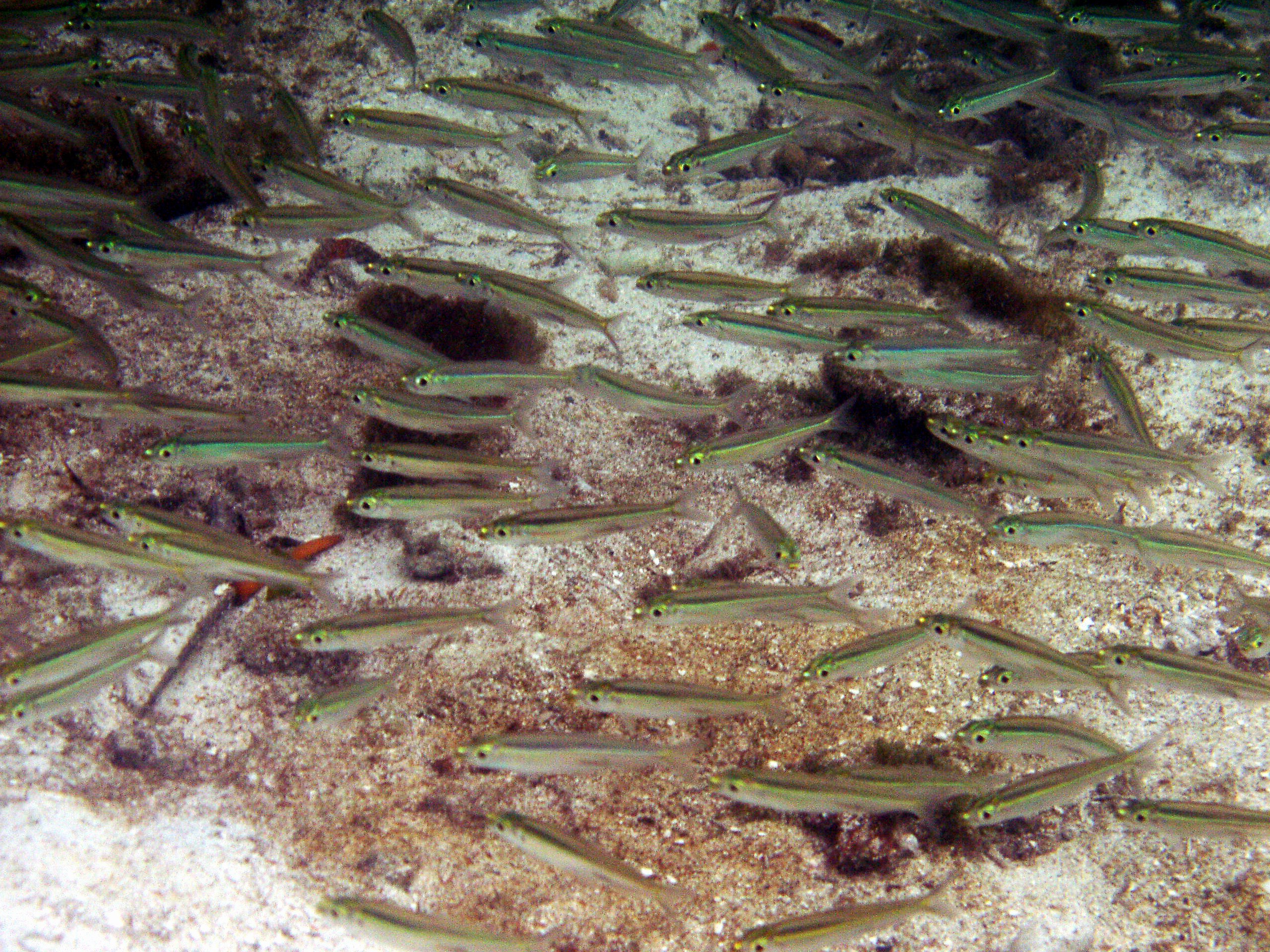
Jenkinsia are seen in Puerto Rico in 2005.

Jenkinsia is a genus of round herring in the family Spratelloididae. They are found in the central western Atlantic Ocean, the Gulf of Mexico, and the Caribbean Sea. Four recognized species are placed in this genus.

== Species ==
Jenkinsia contains the following species:

- Jenkinsia lamprotaenia (P. H. Gosse, 1851) (dwarf round herring)
- Jenkinsia majua Whitehead, 1963 (little-eye round herring)
- Jenkinsia parvula Cervigón & Velazquez, 1978 (short-striped round herring)
- Jenkinsia stolifera (D. S. Jordan & C. H. Gilbert, 1884) (Florida round herring)
