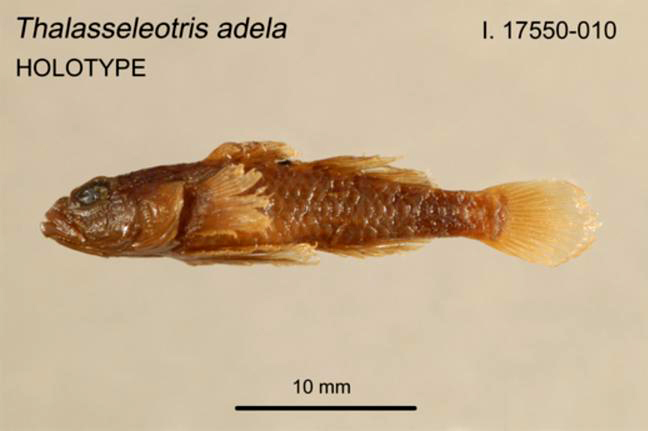
- Holotype of the Cryptic Sea Gudgeon, Thalasseleotris adela

Scientific classification
- Kingdom: Animalia
- Phylum: Chordata
- Class: Actinopterygii
- Order: Gobiiformes
- Family: Thalasseleotrididae
- Genus: Thalasseleotris; Hoese & Larson, 1987

= Thalasseleotris =

Genus of fishes

Thalasseleotris is a genus of gobies comprising two species in the family Thalasseleotrididae from the south-western Pacific Ocean in the seas off Australia and New Zealand. The generic name is derived from the Greek Thalassa meaning "sea" and the generic name Eleotris as at the time it was named the genus was considered to be in the family Eleotridae.

== Species ==
The two species in Thalasseleotris are:

- Thalasseleotris adela Hoese & Larson, 1987 - Marine gudgeon
- Thalasseleotris iota Hoese & Roberts, 2005 - New Zealand pygmy sleeper
