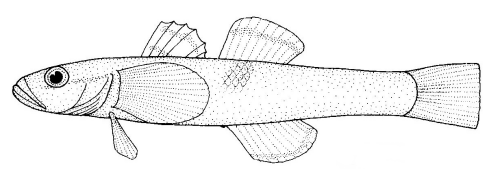
- Grahamichthys radiata

Scientific classification
- Kingdom: Animalia
- Phylum: Chordata
- Class: Actinopterygii
- Order: Gobiiformes
- Suborder: Gobioidei
- Family: Thalasseleotrididae; A. C. Gill & Mooi, 2012

= Thalasseleotrididae =

Family of fishes

Thalasseleotrididae is a family of two genera of the order Gobiiformes which are found in the temperate seas of Australia and New Zealand. They were formerly classified as part of the family Eleotridae but workers had noted that these genera were atypical members of the Eleotridae. The Thalasseleotrididae was erected as a family based on both genera having similar osteological characteristics in the bones of pectoral girdle and the gill arches and having the first gill slit restricted or closed by a broad membrane which connects the hyoid arch to the first ceratobranchial bone. This family is considered to be a sister group to the family Gobiidae.

== Genera ==
There are three genera classified within the Thalasseleotrididae:

- Grahamichthys Whitley, 1956
- Tempestichthys Goatley, C.H.R. and Tornabene, 2022
- Thalasseleotris Hoese & Larson, 1987
