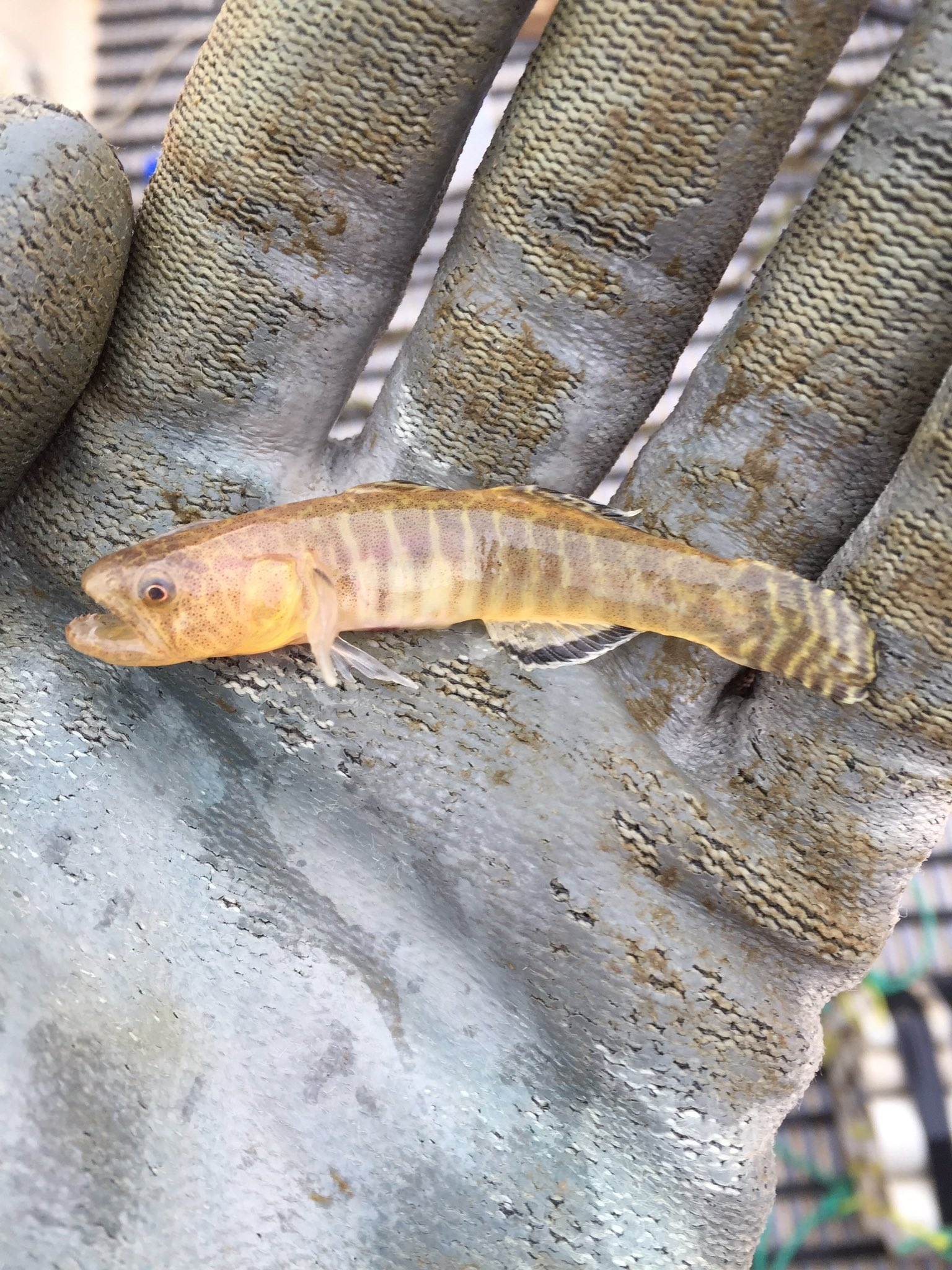

Scientific classification
- Kingdom: Animalia
- Phylum: Chordata
- Class: Actinopterygii
- Order: Gobiiformes
- Family: Thalasseleotrididae
- Genus: Grahamichthys; Whitley, 1956
- Species: G. radiatus

Binomial name
- Grahamichthys radiatus (Valenciennes, 1837)

Synonyms
- Grahamichthys radiata; Eleotris radiata Valenciennes 1837

= Graham's gudgeon =

Species of fish

Graham's gudgeon (Grahamichthys radiatus; Māori: kuraihina or kurahina) is a species of goby of the family Thalasseleotrididae, the only member of the genus Grahamichthys. This species is found in rock pools and in the neritic zone, to 50 metres (160 ft) in depth, where sand or mud is lies around and partially buries rocks, shells, or other objects. It is unusual for a goby, in that it lives in loose schools.

== Etymology ==
The generic name is a compound formed from the surname Graham in honour of David H. Graham who wrote A Treasury of New Zealand Fishes which was published in 1953 and therefore is an allusion to this taxon being endemic to New Zealand and the Greek ichthys meaning "fish".
