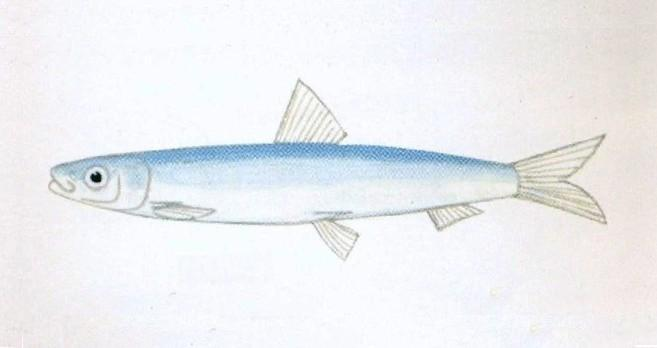
- Spratelloides delicatulus

Scientific classification
- Kingdom: Animalia
- Phylum: Chordata
- Class: Actinopterygii
- Division: Teleostei
- Order: Clupeiformes
- Suborder: Clupeoidei
- Family: Spratelloididae; Jordan, 1925

Genera
- see text

= Spratelloididae =

Spratelloididae Temporal range: Early Eocene to present

Family of ray-finned fishes

Spratelloididae is a small family of marine ray-finned fishes belonging to the suborder Clupeoidei of the order Clupeiformes, which also includes the anchovies and herrings. The taxa in this family were previously classified within the family Clupeidae but are now considered to be a valid family. One genus, Jenkinsia is found in the Western Atlantic, the other, Spratelloides, in the Indian and Pacific Oceans.

== Genera ==
Spratelloididae contains the following two genera:

- Jenkinsia D. S. Jordan & Evermann, 1896
- Spratelloides Bleeker, 1851

The fossil genus †Trollichthys Marramà & Carnevale, 2015 from the Early Eocene of Monte Bolca, Italy, which was initially considered a round herring, has been identified as a stem-member of Spratelloididae.
