= Horse railway =

Horse railway may refer to:

- Horsecar
- Plateway
- Wagonway
- Horse drawn railway
