= Horsecar =

Horse-powered tram or streetcar

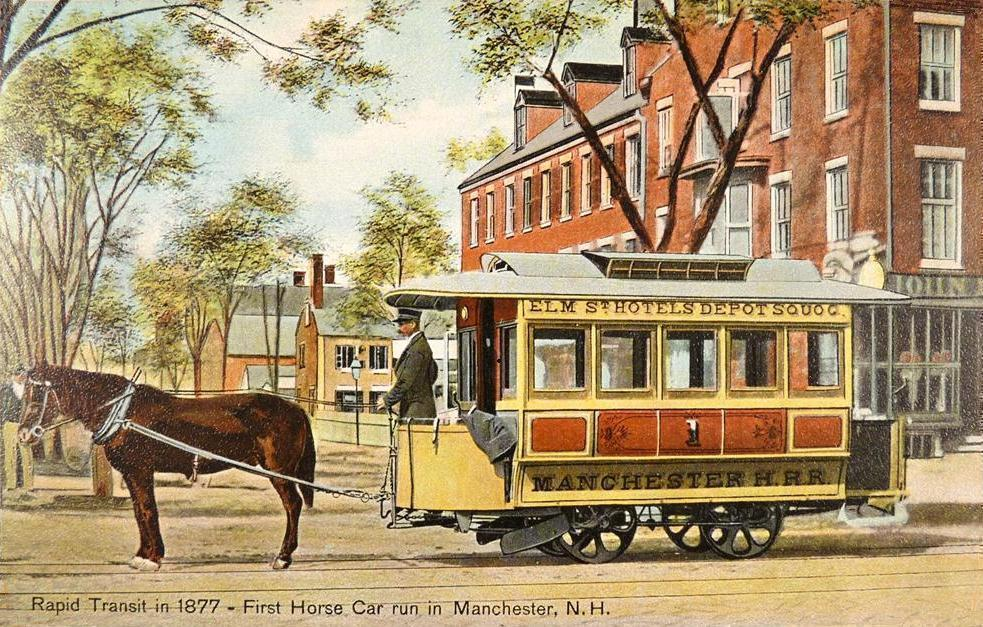
The first horsecar in Manchester, New Hampshire, dating from 1877, and on display c. 1908

A horsecar, horse-drawn tram, horse-drawn streetcar (U.S.), or horse-drawn railway (historical), is a tram or streetcar pulled by a horse.

== Summary ==
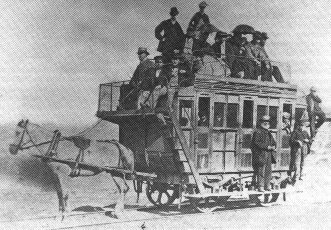
The Swansea and Mumbles Railway ran the world's first passenger tram service in 1807

The horse-drawn tram (horsecar) is an early form of public rail transport, that first ran on public streets in the 1830s, using the newly improved iron or steel rail or 'tramway'. When it arrived in Europe it was termed the "Americain Railway".

The horse-drawn tram developed out of industrial haulage routes that had long been in existence, and from the horse-drawn omnibus routes. They were local versions of the stagecoach lines and picked up and dropped off passengers on a regular route, without the need to be pre-hired. Horsecars on tramlines were an improvement over the omnibus, because the low rolling resistance of metal wheels on iron or steel rails (usually grooved from 1852 on) allowed the horses to haul a greater load for a given effort than the omnibus, and gave a smoother ride. By 1860 New York, New Orleans, Brooklyn, Boston, Philadelphia, Baltimore, Pittsburgh, Chicago, and Cincinnati had already a horsecar network.

The horse-drawn streetcar combined the low cost, flexibility, and safety of animal power with the efficiency, smoothness, and all-weather capability of a rail track. Animal power at the time was seen as safer than steam power in that early locomotives frequently suffered from boiler explosions. Rails were seen as all-weather because streets of the time might be poorly paved, or not paved at all, allowing wagon wheels to sink in mud during rain or snow.

== History ==
=== Canada ===
In 1861, Toronto Street Railway horsecars replaced horse-drawn omnibuses as a public transit mode in Toronto. Electric streetcars later replaced the horsecars between 1892 and 1894. The Toronto Street Railway created Toronto's unique broad gauge of 4 ft 10 7/8 in (1,495 mm). The streets were unpaved, and a step rail was employed. The horsecars had flanged wheels and ran on the upper level of the step. Ordinary wagons and carriages ran on the broad lower step inside. This necessitated a wider gauge. This broad Toronto gauge is still used today by the Toronto streetcar system and three lines of the Toronto subway. The Metropolitan Street Railway operated a horsecar line in then-suburban North Toronto from 1885 until the line was electrified in 1890; this horsecar line also used Toronto gauge.

There were a number of horse car operators in Canadian cities in the mid to late 1800s, including in: Kitchener-Waterloo, London, Montreal, Ottawa, Quebec City, St. Thomas, Toronto, and Winnipeg.

=== Continental Europe ===
The first horse-drawn rail cars in Continental Europe were operated from 1828 by the České Budějovice - Linz railway, cities currently lying in Czechia and Austria respectively. Europe saw a proliferation of horsecar use for new tram services from the mid-1860s, with many towns building new networks.

=== India ===
The first horse-drawn trams in India ran a 2.4-mile (3.9 km) distance between Sealdah and Armenian Ghat Street on 24 February 1873. The service was discontinued on 20 November of that year. The Calcutta Tramway Company was formed and registered in London on 22 December 1880. Metre-gauge horse-drawn tram tracks were laid from Sealdah to Armenian Ghat via Bowbazar Street, Dalhousie Square and Strand Road. The route was inaugurated by Viceroy Ripon on 1 November 1880. In 1882, steam locomotives were deployed experimentally to haul tram cars. By the end of the 19th century the company owned 166 tram cars, 1,000 horses, seven steam locomotives and 19 mi (31 km) of tram tracks. In 1900, electrification of the tramway and reconstruction of its tracks to 4 ft 8 1/2 in (1,435 mm) (standard gauge) began. In 1902, the first electric tramcar in India ran from Esplanade to Kidderpore on 27 March and on 14 June from Esplanade to Kalighat.

The Bombay Tramway Company was set up in 1873. After a contract was signed between the Bombay Tramway Company, the municipality and the Stearns and Kitteredge company, the Bombay Presidency enacted the Bombay Tramways Act, 1874 licensing the company to run a horsecar tram service in the city. On 9 May 1874 the first horse-drawn carriage made its début in the city, plying the Colaba–Pydhone via Crawford Market, and Bori Bunder to Pydhonie via Kalbadevi routes. The initial fare was three annas (15 paise pre-decimalisation), and no tickets were issued. As the service became increasingly popular, the fare was reduced to two annas (10 pre-decimalisation paise). Later that year, tickets were issued to curb increasing ticket-less travel. Stearns and Kitteredge reportedly had a stable of 1,360 horses over the lifetime of the service.

=== United Kingdom ===
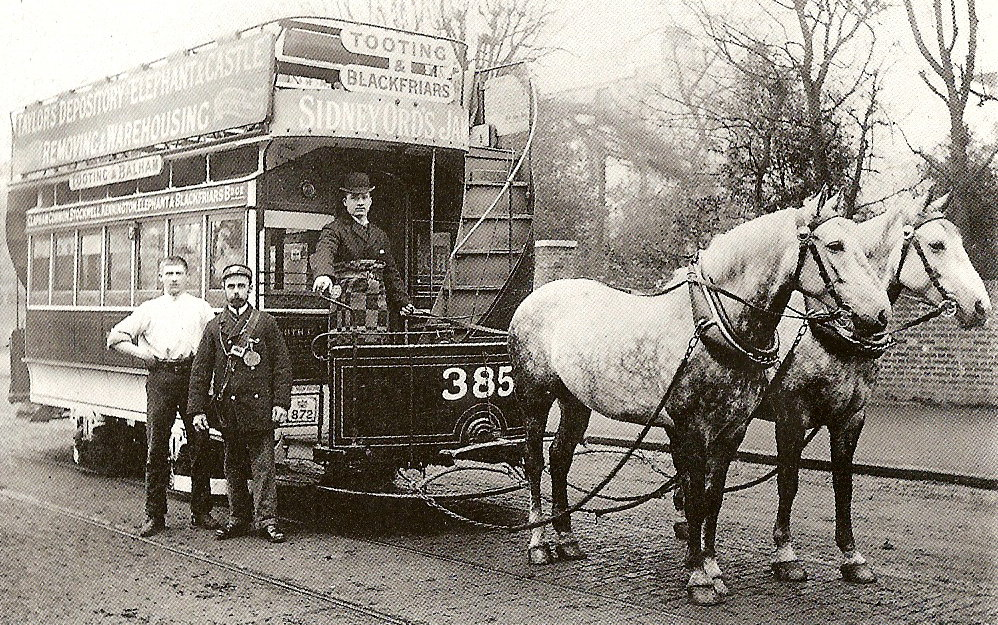
London Tramways two-horse tram, about 1890.

The first tram services in the world were started by the Swansea and Mumbles Railway in Wales, using specially designed carriages on an existing tramline built for horse-drawn freight dandies. Fare-paying passengers were carried on a line between Oystermouth, Mumbles and Swansea Docks from 1807. The Gloucester and Cheltenham Tramroad (1809) carried passengers although its main purpose was freight.

In spite of its early start, it took many years for horse-drawn streetcars to become widely acceptable across Britain; the American George Francis Train first introduced them to Birkenhead Corporation Tramways' predecessor in Birkenhead in 1860 but was jailed for "breaking and injuring" the highway when he next tried to lay the first tram tracks on the roads of London. An 1870 Act of Parliament overcame these legal obstacles by defining responsibilities and for the next three decades many local tramway companies were founded, using horse-drawn carriages, until replaced by cable, steam or electric traction. Many companies adopted a design of a partly enclosed double-decker carriage hauled by two horses. The last horse-drawn tram was retired from London in 1915. Horses continued to be used for light shunting well into the 20th century. The last horse used for shunting on British Railways was retired on 21 February 1967 in Newmarket, Suffolk.

=== United States ===
In the United States, the very first streetcar appeared in New Orleans in 1832, operated by the Pontchartrain Railroad Company, followed by those in 1832 on the New York and Harlem Railroad in New York City. The latter cars were designed by John Stephenson of New Rochelle, New York, and constructed at his company in New York City. The earliest streetcars used horses and sometimes mules, usually two as a team, to haul the cars. Rarely, other animals were tried, including humans in emergency circumstances. By the mid-1880s, there were 415 street railway companies in the US operating over 6,000 miles (9,700 km) of track and carrying 188 million passengers per year using horsecars. By 1890 New Yorkers took 297 horsecar rides per capita per year. The average street car horse had a life expectancy of about two years.

=== Elsewhere ===
Several horsecar lines still operate in the Yucatán, like this one at Hacienda San Nicolás Dzoyaxché.

Tropical plantations (for products such as henequen and bananas) made extensive use of animal-powered trams for both passengers and freight, often employing the Decauville narrow-gauge portable track system. In some cases these systems were very extensive and evolved into interurban tram networks (as in the Yucatan, which sported over 3,000 kilometers (1,900 mi) of such lines). Surviving examples may be found in both Brazil and the Yucatán, and some examples in the latter still use horsecars.

=== Decline ===
Problems with horsecars included the fact that any given horse could only work so many hours on a given day, had to be housed, groomed, fed and cared for day in and day out, and produced prodigious amounts of manure, which the streetcar company was charged with storing and then disposing. Since a typical horse pulled a streetcar for about a dozen miles (19 km) a day and worked for four or five hours, many systems needed ten or more horses in stable for each horsecar. In London, the working life of a tram horse was four years whereas it was six months longer hauling buses. This was due to the extra effort needed to start and stop the heavier tramcars.

Horsecars were largely replaced by electric-powered streetcars following the introduction of electric powered streetcars in the 1880s. The first public electric tramway used for permanent service was the Gross-Lichterfelde tramway in Lichterfelde near Berlin in Germany, which opened in 1881. This was the world's first commercially successful electric tram. It drew current from the rails at first, with overhead wire being installed in 1883. Frank J. Sprague's spring-loaded trolley pole used a wheel to travel along the wire. In late 1887 and early 1888, using his trolley system, Sprague installed the first successful large electric street railway system in Richmond, Virginia. Long a transportation obstacle, the hills of Richmond included grades of over 10%, and were an excellent proving ground for acceptance of the new technology in other cities. Within a year, the economy of electric power had replaced more costly horsecars in many cities. By 1889, 110 electric railways incorporating Sprague's equipment had been begun or planned on several continents.

An 1890 census of street railways in the United States accounted 5,661.44 miles (9,111.20 km) of animal powered streetcar tracks in the country. By 1907, the United States Department of Commerce and Labor reported trackage under animal power at a combined 135.11 miles (217.44 km) across the country (28 of the 945 reporting companies in the United States that year utilized any amount of animal power).

Many large metropolitan lines lasted well into the early twentieth century. New York City had a regular horsecar service on the Bleecker Street Line until its closure in 1917. Pittsburgh, Pennsylvania, had its Sarah Street line drawn by horses until 1923. The last regular mule-drawn cars in the US, the Sulphur Rock Railway, ran in Sulphur Rock, Arkansas, until 1926 and were commemorated by a U.S. postage stamp issued in 1983. Toronto's horse-drawn streetcar operations ended in 1891. In other countries animal-powered tram services often continued well into the 20th century; the last mule tram service in Mexico City ended in 1932, and a mule tram in Celaya, Mexico, survived until 1954.

== Operational horsecars ==
A few original horsecar lines have survived or have been revived as tourist attractions, and in recent years several replica horsecar lines have been built. Below is a list of locations around the world with operational horsecars that are open to the public.

Location	Image	Coordinates	Location	Country	Track gauge	Year originally built	Notes
Cuzamá Cenote Tours		20.719964°N 89.383439°W	Cuzamá Municipality, Yucatán	Mexico	500 mm (19 3/4 in)	After 1875	Two competing horsecar services use the same stretch of track leading to the cenotes, with one service originating from a branch ending in the southern outskirts of Cuzamá, and the other from a branch ending a short distance further south in Chunkanán.
Döbeln Tramway		51.119467°N 13.119690°E	Döbeln, Saxony	Germany	1,000 mm (3 ft 3 3/8 in) metre gauge	1892	
Douglas Bay Horse Tramway		54.167378°N 4.460777°W	Douglas	Isle of Man	3 ft (914 mm)	1876	
Ghora Tram		31.450257°N 73.563902°E	Ghangha Pur, Punjab	Pakistan	2 ft (610 mm)	1898	
Hacienda San Nicolás Dzoyaxché		20.788693°N 89.590334°W	Mérida Municipality, Yucatán	Mexico	500 mm (19 3/4 in)	After 1875	
Hacienda Sotuta de Peón		20.742847°N 89.573903°W	Tecoh Municipality, Yucatán	Mexico	500 mm (19 3/4 in)	After 1875	
Historical Village of Hokkaido		43.044230°N 141.499428°E	Sapporo, Hokkaido	Japan	2 ft 6 in (762 mm)	1983	
Horse-Drawn Streetcars (Disneyland Park (Paris))		48.871276°N 2.779073°E	Marne-la-Vallée, Île-de-France	France	3 ft (914 mm)	1992	Located in Disneyland Paris.
Kerschbaum Horse-Drawn Railway		48.584936°N 14.470366°E	Rainbach im Mühlkreis, Upper Austria	Austria	1,106 mm (3 ft 7 1/2 in)	1828	Reconstructed portion of the Budweis-Linz-Gmunden Horse Railway, the first railway line in Continental Europe to carry passengers.
Koiwai Farm		39.753788°N 141.020163°E	Shizukuishi, Iwate	Japan	3 ft (914 mm)	1904	
Main Street Vehicles (Disneyland)		33.810506°N 117.919564°W	Anaheim, California	(United States) US	3 ft (914 mm)	1955	Located in the Disneyland Resort.
Main Street Vehicles (Magic Kingdom)		28.417105°N 81.581644°W	Bay Lake, Florida	(United States) US	3 ft (914 mm)	1971	Located in Walt Disney World.
Mrozy Horse Tram		52.162412°N 21.806021°E	Mrozy, Masovian Voivodeship	Poland	1,000 mm (3 ft 3 3/8 in) metre gauge	1908	
Rösslitram		47.223456°N 8.822244°E	Rapperswil, St. Gallen	Switzerland	2 ft (610 mm)	1962	Located in Knie's Kinderzoo.
Spiekeroog Museum Horse-Drawn Tram		53.769413°N 7.689123°E	Spiekeroog, Lower Saxony	Germany	1,000 mm (3 ft 3 3/8 in) metre gauge	1885	
Victor Harbor Horse Drawn Tram		35.556095°S 138.624294°E	Victor Harbor, South Australia	Australia	5 ft 3 in (1,600 mm)	1864	

== See also ==
- Cable car (railway)
- Carville (San Francisco)
- Dandy waggon
- Hay Railway
- List of horse-drawn railways
- Omaha Horse Railway
- Rail transport in Walt Disney Parks and Resorts
- Slate waggon
- Trolley (horse-drawn)
- Wagonway (horse-drawn railways)
