= Cuzamá Municipality =

Municipality in the Mexican state of Yucatán

Cuzamá
- Municipality
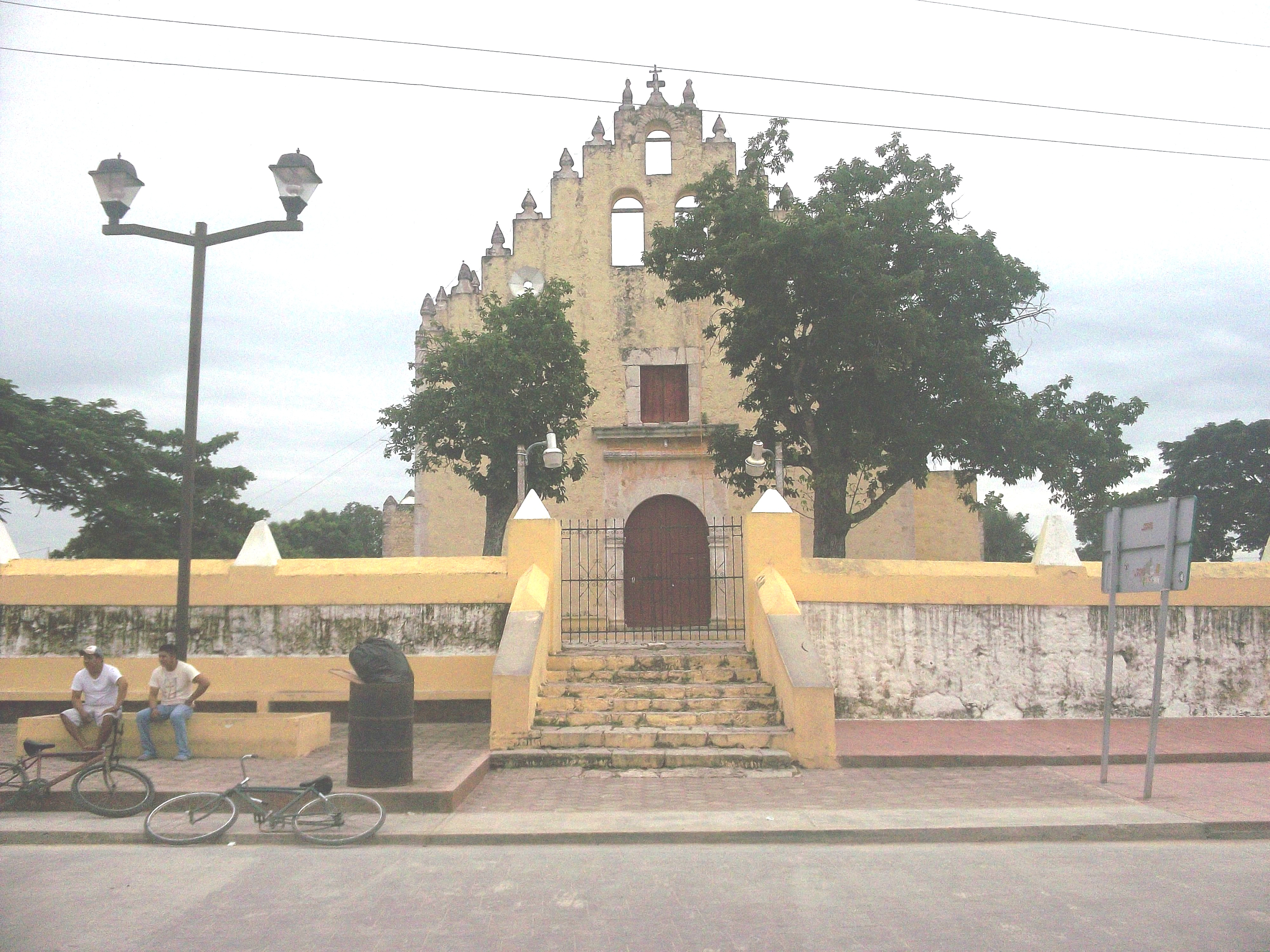
- Principal Church of Cuzamá, Yucatán

- Region 3 Centro #015

- Location of the Municipality in Mexico
- Coordinates: 20°44′00″N 89°18′00″W
- Country: Mexico
- State: Yucatán
- Mexico Ind.: 1821
- Yucatán Est.: 1824
- Municipality Founded: 1925

Government
  - Type: 2012–2015
  - Municipal President: Wilbert Orlando Soberanis Villanueva

Area
  - Total: 150.73 km^{2} (58.20 sq mi)
- Elevation: 10 m (33 ft)

Population (2010)
  - Total: 4,966
  - Density: 32.95/km^{2} (85.33/sq mi)
- Time zone: UTC-6 (Central Standard Time)
- INEGI Code: 015
- Major Airport: Merida (Manuel Crescencio Rejón) International Airport
- IATA Code: MID
- ICAO Code: MMMD

Cuzamá Municipality (In the Yucatec Maya Language: “place to swallow water”) is a municipality in the Mexican state of Yucatán containing 150.73 km^{2} of land and located roughly 45 km southeast of the city of Mérida.

== History ==
It is unknown which chieftainship the area was under prior to the arrival of the Spanish. After the conquest the area became part of the encomienda system. As early as 1607, the encomienda of Cuzamá was shared with the encomendero of Homún. In 1710, the encomenderos were Alfonso de Aranda y Aguayo and Pedro de Mézquita.

Yucatán declared its independence from the Spanish Crown in 1821 and in 1825, the area was assigned to the Coastal region with its headquarters in Izamal Municipality. In 1846, it passed to the Homún Municipality and was reassigned again in 1870 to the Acanceh Municipality. It was designated as its own municipality by 1925.

== Governance ==
The municipal president is elected for a three-year term. The town council has four councilpersons, who serve as Secretary and councilors of monuments and heritage, public services, policing commissaries, and ecology.

The Municipal Council administers the business of the municipality. It is responsible for budgeting and expenditures and producing all required reports for all branches of the municipal administration. Annually it determines educational standards for schools.

The Police Commissioners ensure public order and safety. They are tasked with enforcing regulations, distributing materials and administering rulings of general compliance issued by the council.

== Communities ==
The head of the municipality is Cuzamá, Yucatán. The other populated areas of the municipality include Chunkanán, Eknakán, Nohchakán, and Yaxcucul. The significant populations are shown below:

Community	Population
Entire Municipality (2010)	4,966
Chunkanán	335 in 2005
Cuzamá	3,577 in 2005
Eknakán	659 in 2005
Nohchakán	175 in 2005

== Local festivals ==
Every year from 1 to 8 September is a celebration for the Nativity of the Virgin Mary.

== Tourist attractions ==
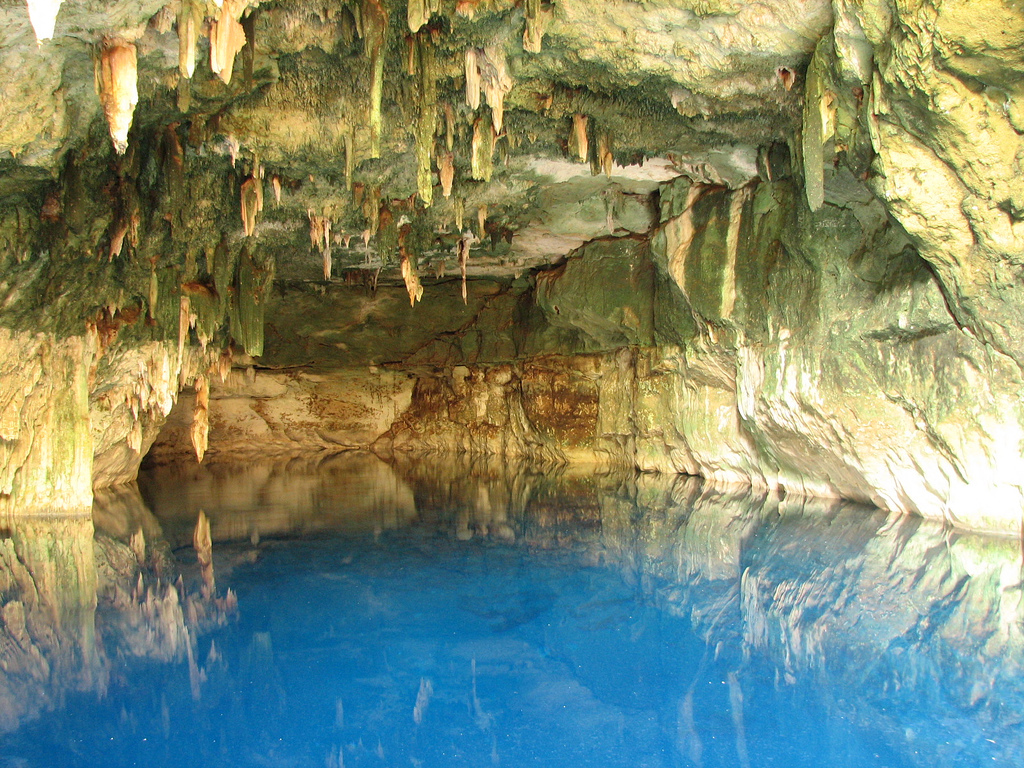
Cenote in Cuzamá

- Church of the Holy Trinity, built in the sixteenth century
- Church of St. Francis of Assisi, built in the colonial era
- Archeological site at Chuncanan
- Archeological site at Eknacan
- Archeological site at Xculab
- Cuzamá cenotes: Bolonchojol, Chacsinicche, and Chelentun. Two competing horse-drawn tram services use the same stretch of 500 mm (19 3/4 in) narrow gauge track leading to the cenotes.
- Hacienda Cuchbalam
