= Granite Island Recreation Park =

Protected area in South Australia

- IUCN category IV (habitat/species management area)
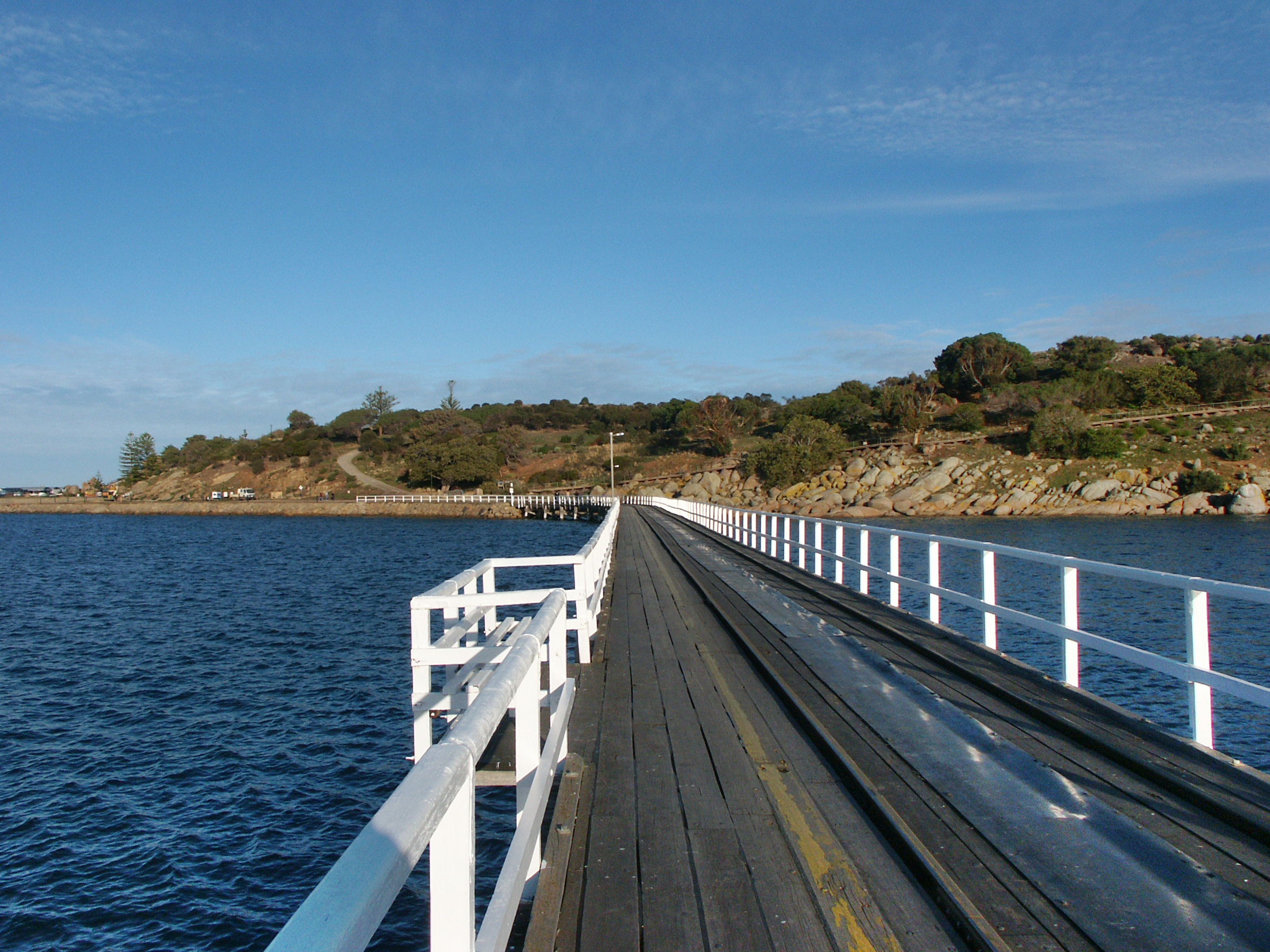
- Causeway leading to Granite Island from Victor Harbor

- Location within South Australia
- Location: South Australia
- Nearest city: Victor Harbor
- Coordinates: 35°33′51″S 138°37′49″E
- Area: 26 ha (64 acres)
- Established: 30 September 1999
- Visitors: 700,000
- Governing body: Department for Environment and Water
- Website: Official website

Granite Island Recreation Park is a protected area including all of Granite Island, which is about 0.6 kilometres (0.37 miles) south-east of Victor Harbor in South Australia and about 120 kilometres (75 miles) south of Adelaide. It is reported as being "the most visited park in South Australia". It was proclaimed in 1999 under the National Parks and Wildlife Act 1972 and is categorised as an IUCN Category IV protected area.

== See also ==
- Victor Harbor Horse Drawn Tram
