= Granite Island (South Australia) =

Island in South Australia

Coordinates: 35°33′S 138°37′E

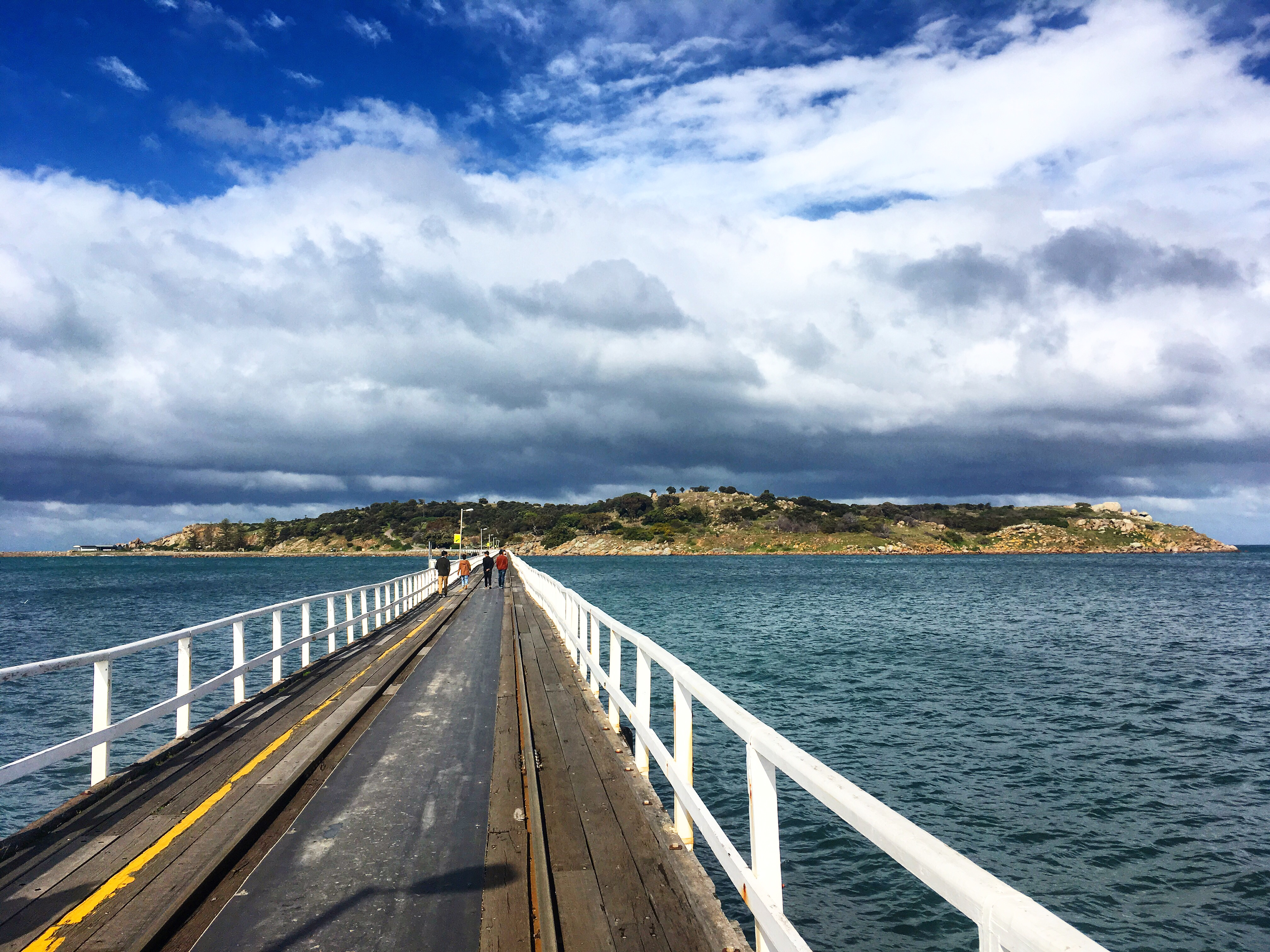
- Granite Island and the Causeway as viewed from Victor Harbor

Geography
- Location: Encounter Bay

Administration
- Australia

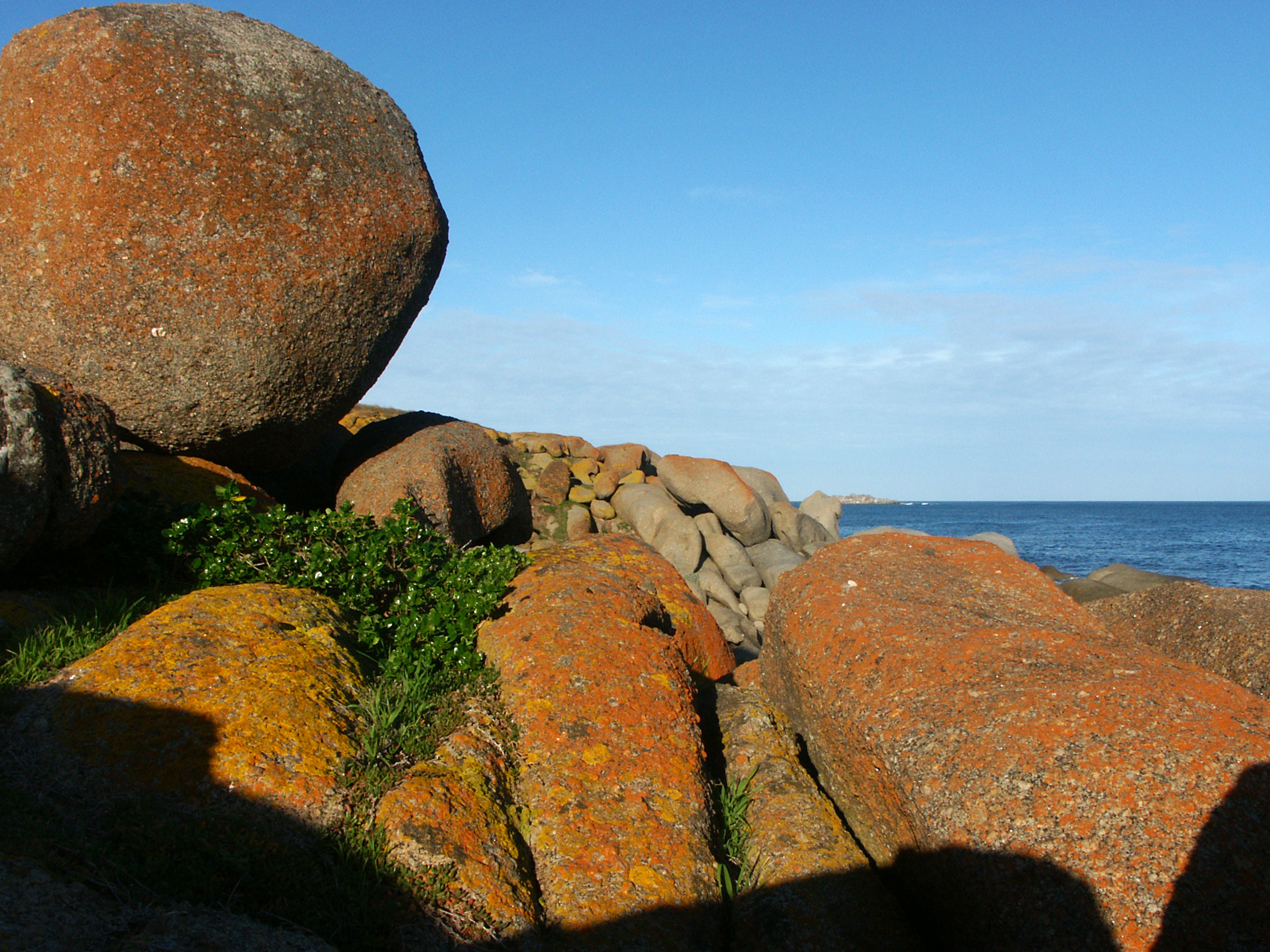
Boulders at sunset on Granite Island

Granite Island, also known by the Ramindjeri people as Nulcoowarra, is a small island next to Victor Harbor, South Australia, about 80 km south of South Australia's capital city, Adelaide.

Although there are no permanent residents, the island has buildings and shelters, including a cafe. It is a popular tourist attraction, particularly for people wishing to see little penguins (commonly called "fairy penguins") which live there. The island also supported resident wallabies in the 1980s which captivated visiting tourists. The island is accessible across a causeway from the mainland, either on foot or by catching a replica horse-drawn tram. The private company Oceanic Victor uses the island as a departure point to ferry tourists to an at-sea, floating aquarium in adjacent waters.

== History ==
A shore-based bay whaling station operated at Granite Island in the 1830s.

On 8 February 1892, Ethel da Silva Dutton, daughter of Henry Dutton of Anlaby, died after falling 80 feet from the rocks on the western side of the island. Ethel was supposedly "searching among the rocks for a pocket knife when her foot slipped and she fell down a precipitous part of the Western Point and thence into the sea". At the time, it was said to be the first accident of its kind at Port Victor.

== Little penguin colony ==
In 1987 a joint state and local government committee was formed "to consider improvements to Granite Island". The committee recommended that the island's tourism potential be maximised while protecting its environment. The committee also specifically recommended "protecting the fairy penguin population".

In 1989, the island's rat and rabbit populations were subjected to culling, with poison used to reduce rat numbers. Rats are known to raid the nests of little penguins. The island's wallaby population was also reduced, with animals relocated as far afield as Cummins on Eyre Peninsula.

In 1990, the wider Encounter Bay little penguin population was estimated to be between 5000 and 7000 penguins. At this time, the colony's breeding season was considered to span July through January, followed by molting season January through March.

In July 1991, the National Parks & Wildlife Service estimated the Encounter Bay area (which includes Granite, West and Wright Islands) population of little penguins to total 7,000 birds.

A general population count conducted in early December 1991 found 571 penguins on Granite Island. Penguins were also counted on West Island and Wright Island, and the total number of penguins in the Encounter Bay area was more than 2600.

In 1992, the island's population was believed to be stable and was estimated to total between 1000 and 1500 little penguins. Nocturnal tours of the penguin colony commenced that year as a joint initiative of the National Parks and Wildlife Service and the Victor Harbor Council.

On 6 November 1992, a man counted nine dead penguins above the high tide mark while walking between Victor Harbor and Port Elliot, but was unable to lodge an official report of the discovery.

=== Fox predation and development concerns ===
Anne Boulter, a local resident who made regular private counts along a limited section of the island, believed the colony to also be stable in 1994. That year, a fox killed 75 penguins on Granite Island in three days and was eventually killed. Her records of the population, which commenced in 1989, showed that the penguins were moulting later each year, and most of the penguins were breeding only once a year.

In 1995, another fox crossed the causeway from the mainland and killed 17 penguins on Granite Island. At that time the population was estimated at 1500 animals and was being surveyed by the Greater Granite Island Development Company, which was also establishing new burrows to support the population. The company began the development of a Penguin Interpretive Centre on the island in 1995 and it was expected to be completed in 1996.

Concerns were raised by Victor Harbor residents that construction of new infrastructure on Granite Island could disturb or harm the penguin colony, including the transportation of heavy construction equipment to the island after dark. Students of the Victor Harbor High School were among those who expressed concern about the extent and the impact of the proposed tourism development on the penguin colony.

In January 1995 a single Fjordland penguin (a species native to New Zealand) came ashore on Granite Island. It was relocated by Parks and Wildlife staff to West Island so that the animal could moult away from human disturbance.

=== Population decline ===
Granite Island's little penguin colony has declined dramatically since the 1990s. In 1998, the colony was considered to be "very healthy" and was estimated to contain 1800 birds. In 2001, the population count was 1,548 penguins. A count conducted in October 2013 totalled 38 penguins. In 2013 the decline prompted the mayor of Victor Harbor, Graham Philp, to begin a fundraising drive to gather funds for research into the genetics of the population and the causes of the decline. In 2015, the number had dropped to 22 birds.

A December 2022 survey estimated 22 birds on Granite Island, with a different study putting the number at 26 that year. After 28 birds were counted in mid-2023, researchers are hopeful of a recovery in numbers.

Some possible drivers of the decline include New Zealand fur seal predation and overfishing. Flinders University intends to establish a centre at which animals can be captively studied, bred, and potentially released back to the wild.

Similarly, dramatic declines have been noted nearby at West Island and at colonies across Backstairs Passage on Kangaroo Island, including closely monitored populations at Penneshaw and Kingscote. Other colonies within Encounter Bay have gone extinct, including those at Wright Island and Freeman's Knob (Port Elliot).

== Penguin Centre ==
Dianne and Stephen Edwards took on the Granite Island lease in 1999, with the view to establishing a floating at-sea aquarium as a tourist attraction and expanding the Penguin Interpretive Centre. The aquarium structure later returned to Boston Bay, Port Lincoln, where it became home to Swim with the Tuna.

In January 2016, the Granite Island Penguin Centre closed. The centre had cared for numerous injured penguins and nursed them back to health over its sixteen years of operation. The centre was also accessible to tourists who were able to view the captive "retired" birds in an artificial enclosure. The centre closed due to the retirement of Dorothy Longden, who managed the centre. Nightly tours were expected to continue to run from the information centre on the mainland.

== Oceanic Victor ==
In early 2015, a proposal to locate a marine tourism venture offshore from Granite Island was made by Oceanic Victor to the Government of South Australia. It received the final necessary approval from the Development Assessment Commission in December 2015. The venture was expected to open for business in February 2016 but was delayed due to an appeal of the Development Assessment Commission's approval decision. The appeal was ultimately dismissed and the attraction was towed into place in July 2017.

The attraction involves a floating sea cage aquaculture pen, containing up to five tonnes of southern bluefin tuna, which paying customers can swim with and hand feed. Lesser quantities of other local marine species can also be seen via a floating underwater observatory within the pen and two touch tank aquaria. The attraction also contains some small sharks and rays. The operation previously ran under the name Swim with the Tuna and was located in Boston Bay near Port Lincoln from 2010 to 2015.

Tourists are transported to the pen from the existing Granite Island kiosk, which is operated by Oceanic Victor.

== See also ==
- Granite Island Recreation Park
- Victor Harbor Horse Drawn Tram
- List of little penguin colonies
