= Cuzamá =

- Municipality and town
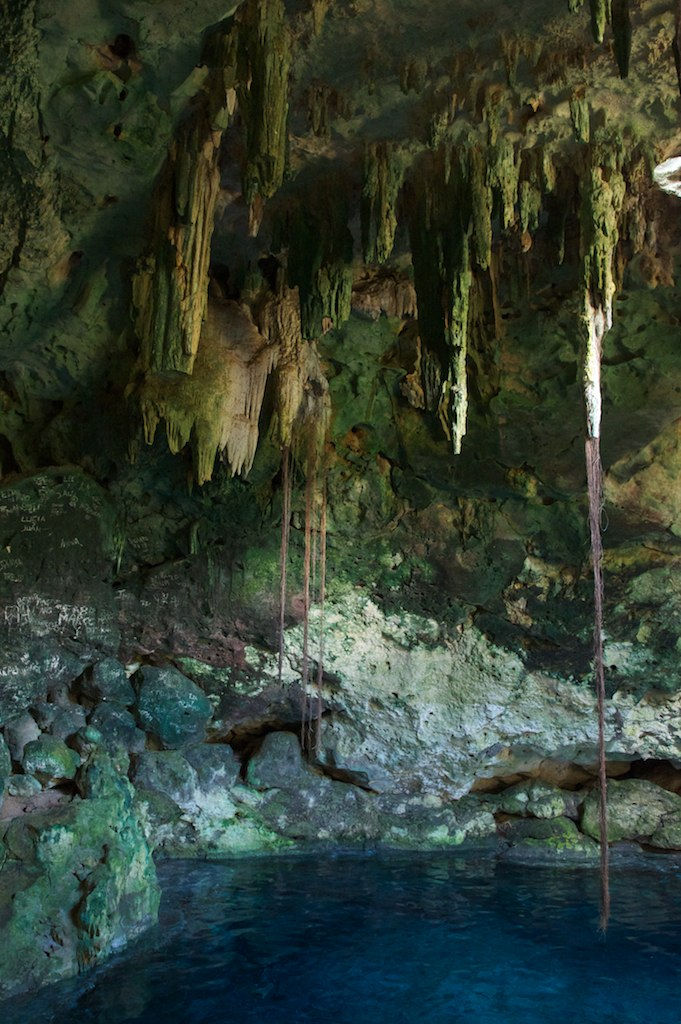
- Cenote Chansinic'Ché.

- Location in Mexico
- Coordinates: 20°44′29″N 89°18′56″W
- Country: Mexico
- State: Yucatan

Population (2010)
  - Total: 3,721
- Time zone: UTC-6
- Postal code: 97577
- Area code: 988

Cuzamá is a town in the Mexican state of Yucatán, capital of the homonymous municipality, located about 50 kilometers southeast of the city of Mérida, the state capital and 15 km southeast of the town of Acanceh.

== Gallery ==
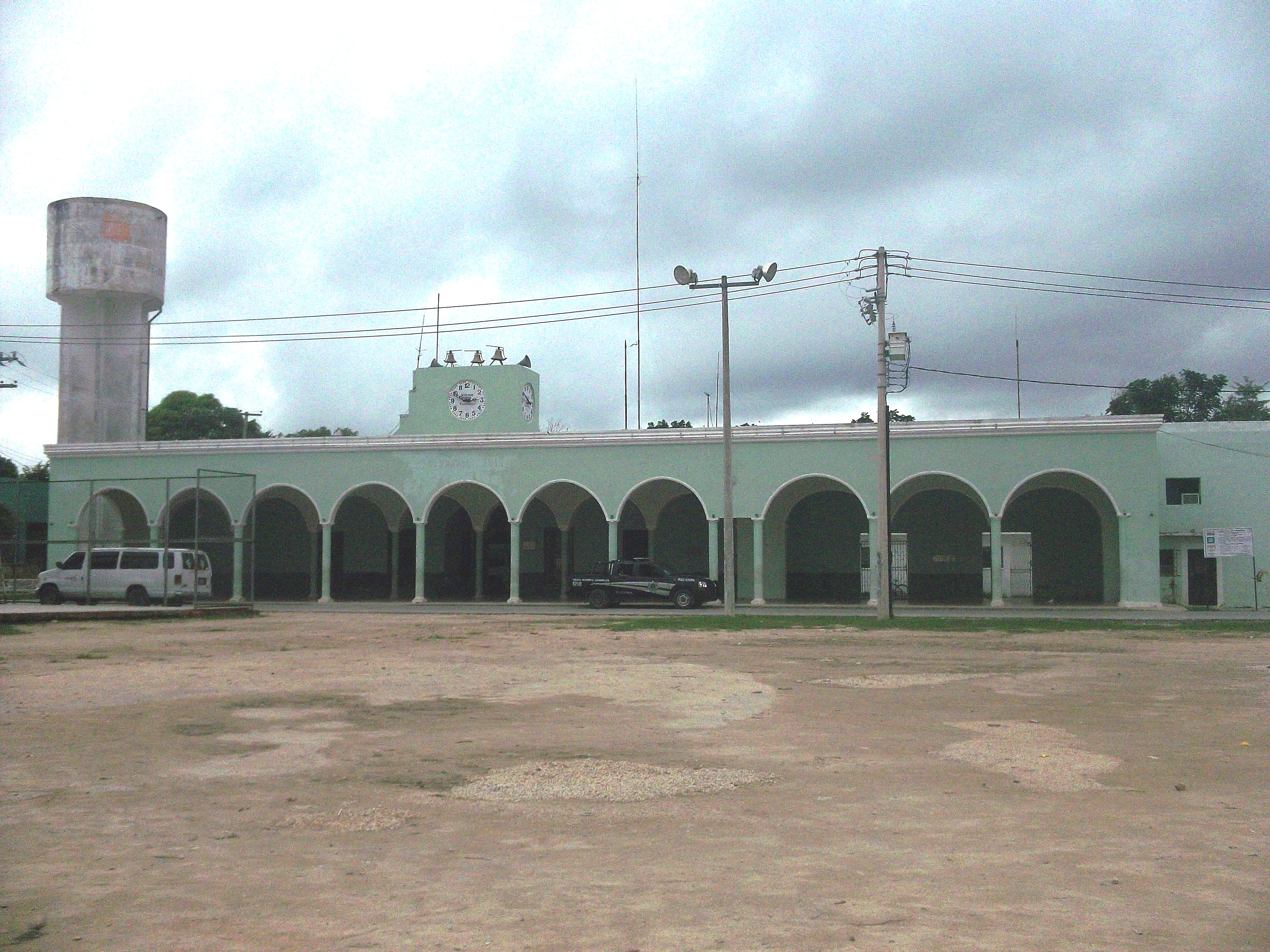
Municipal palace.

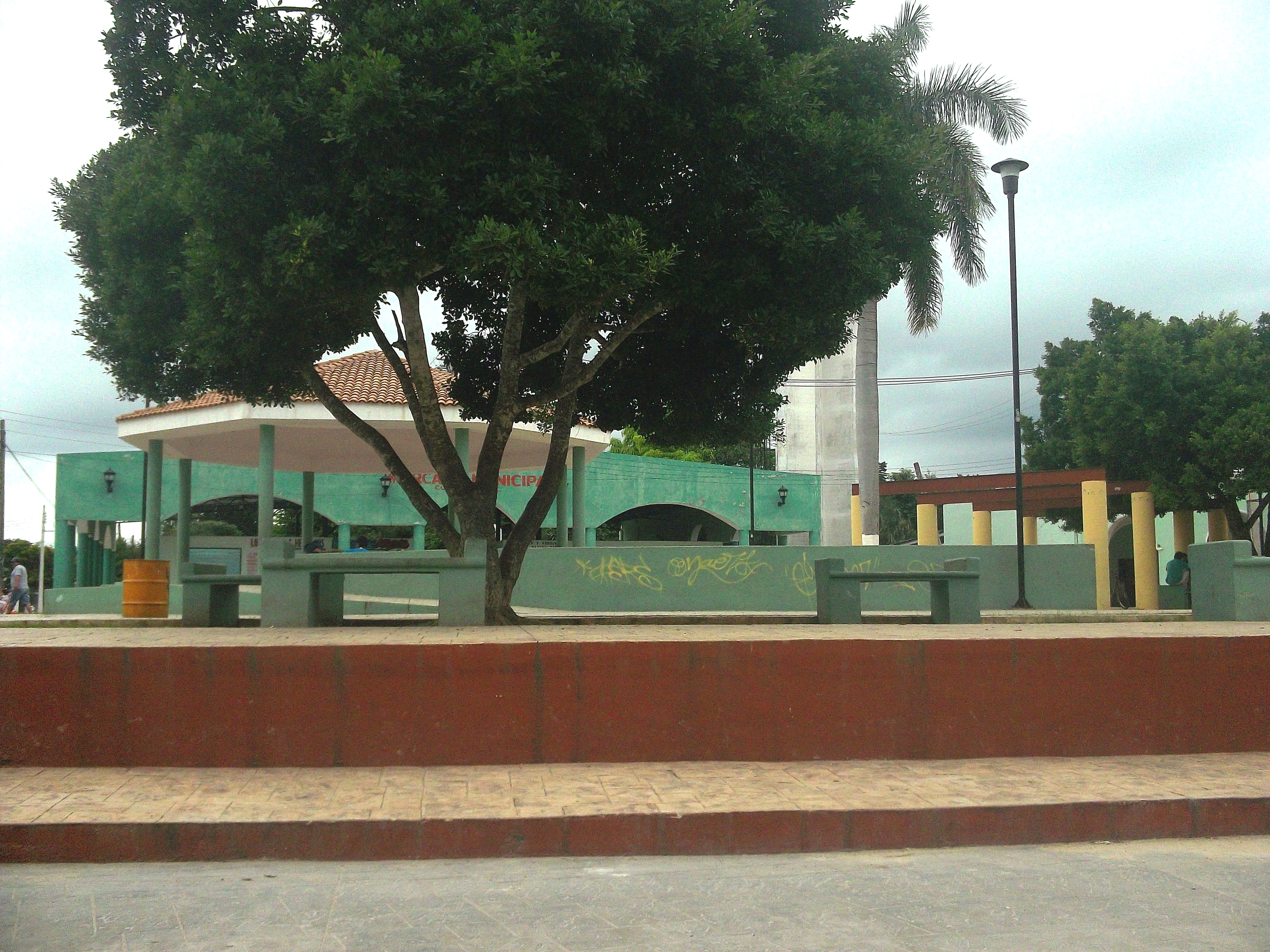
Main park.

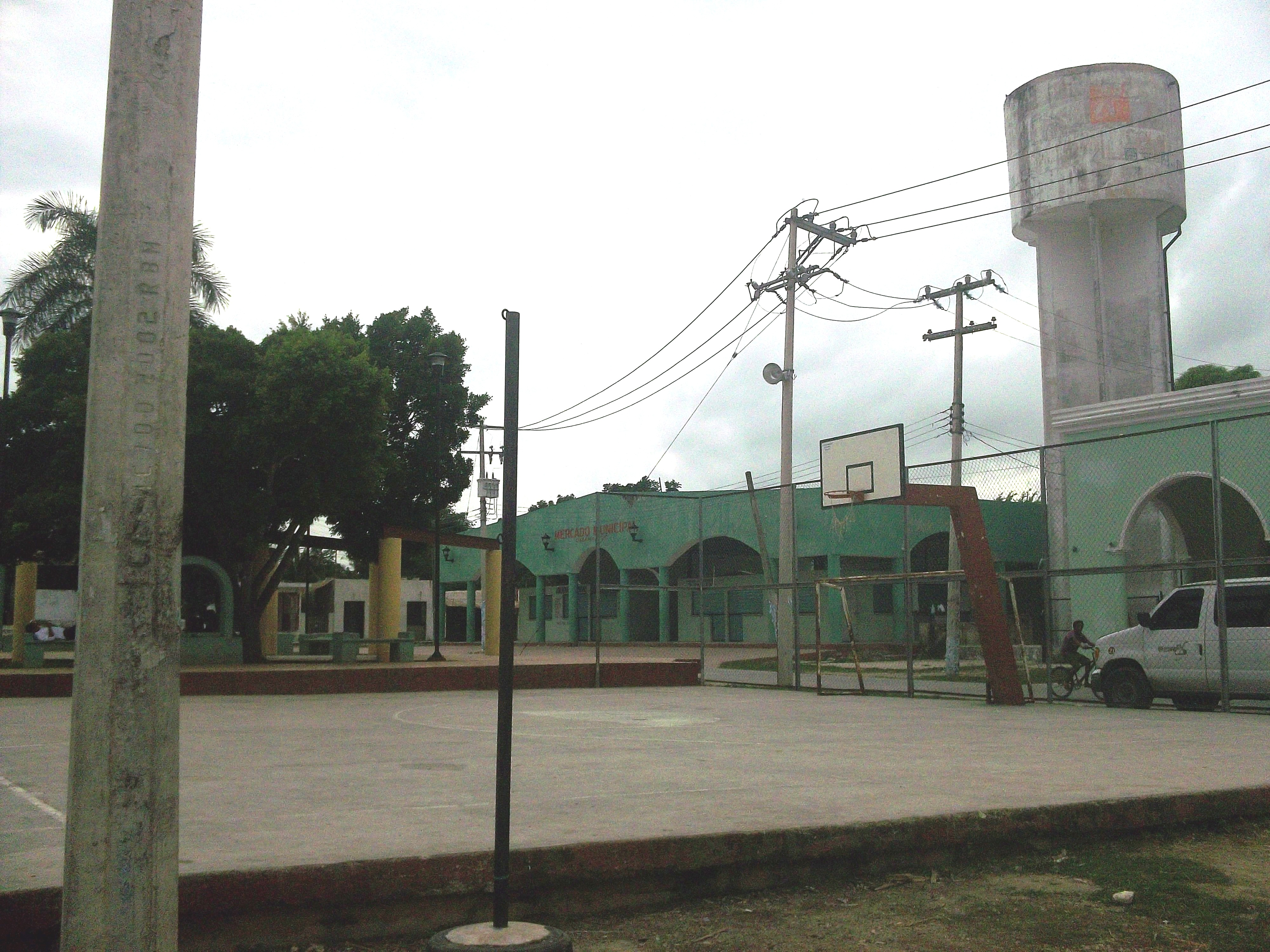
Municipal market.

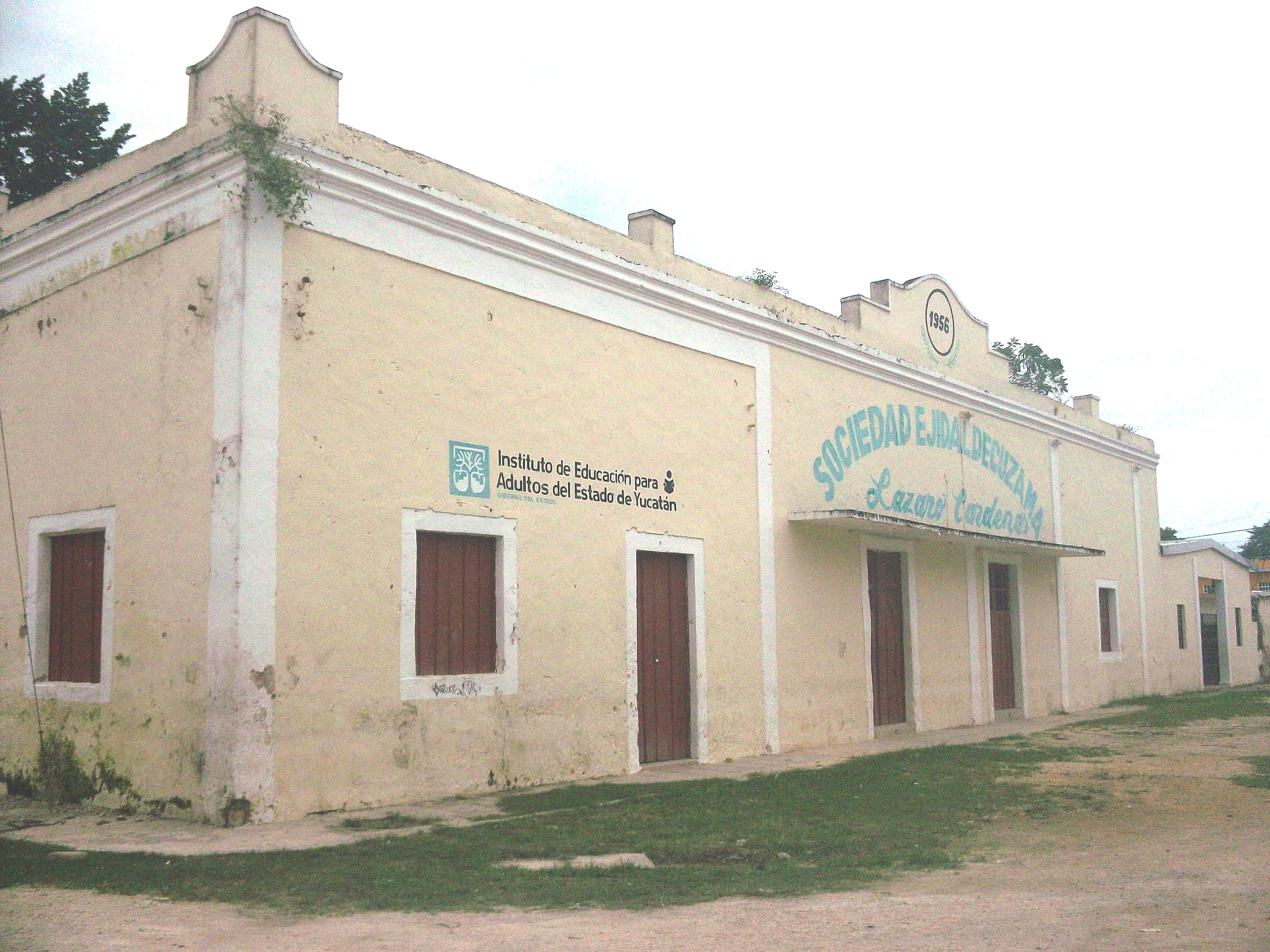
ejidal house.

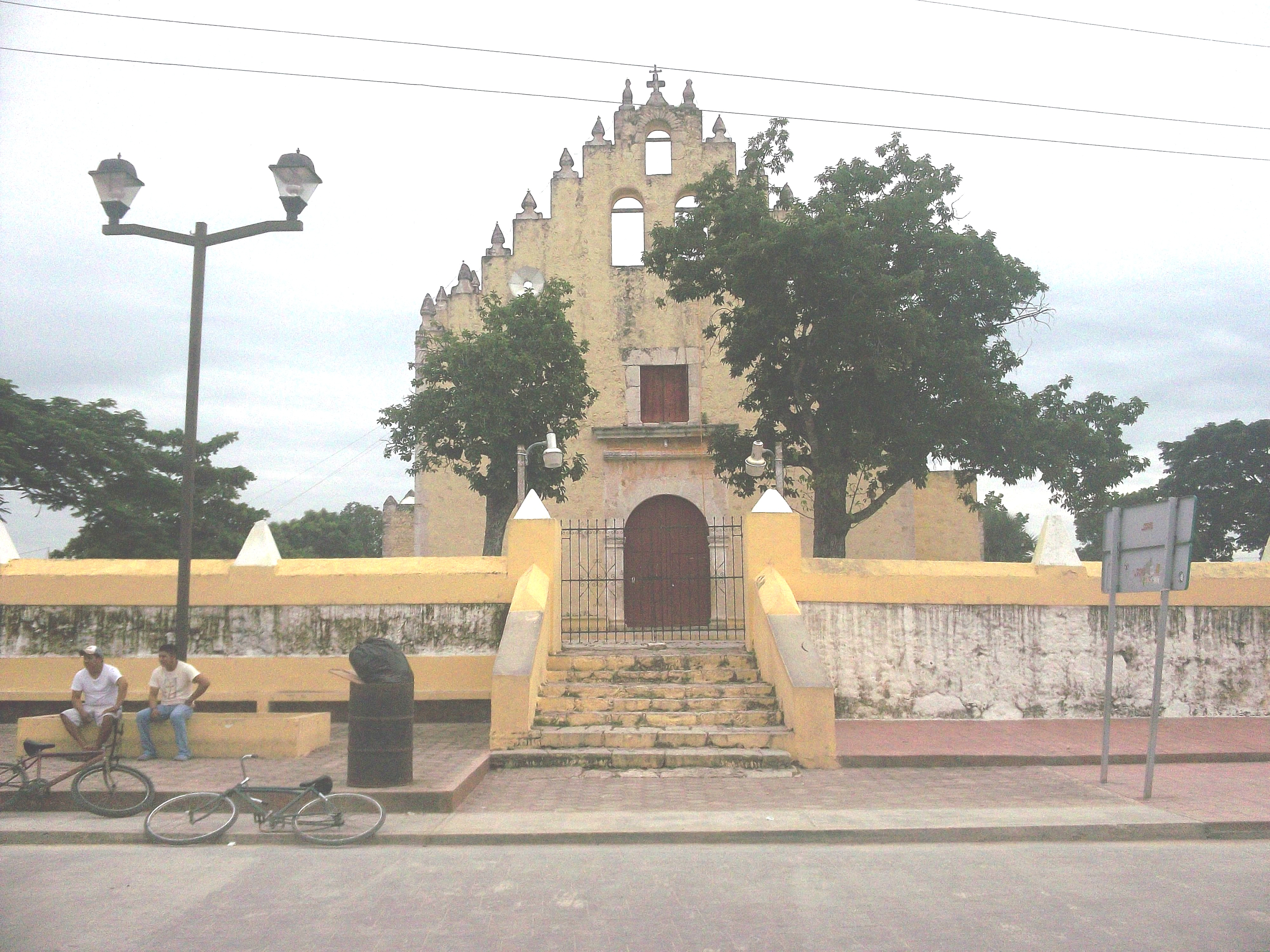
Church on main square of Cuzamá, 2013.
