= Acanceh Municipality =

Municipality in the Mexican state of Yucatán

- Municipality
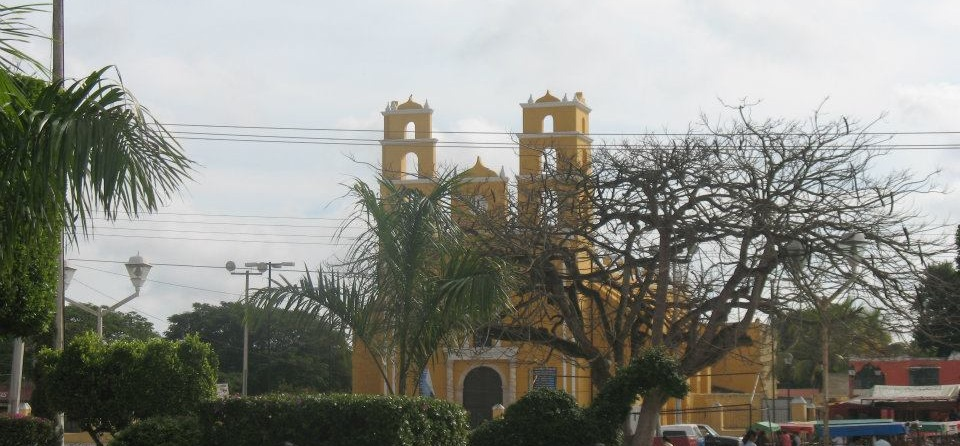
- Church of Acanceh, Yucatán

- Coat of arms

- Region 2 Noroeste #002

- Location of the Municipality in Mexico
- Coordinates: 20°48′46″N 89°27′13″W
- Country: Mexico
- State: Yucatán

Government
  - Type: 2012–2015
  - Municipal President: Jorge Faustino Toloza Pool

Area
  - Total: 153.29 km^{2} (59.19 sq mi)
- Elevation: 6 m (20 ft)

Population (2010)
  - Total: 15,337
- Time zone: UTC-6 (Central Standard Time)
- INEGI Code: 002
- Major Airport: Merida (Manuel Crescencio Rejón) International Airport
- IATA Code: MID
- ICAO Code: MMMD

Acanceh Municipality (In the Yucatec Maya Language: “Where the deer moans”) is a municipality in the Mexican state of Yucatán containing 153.29 km^{2} of land and located roughly 32 km southeast of the city of Mérida.

== History ==
During the Maya period there were mounds and pyramids here. Various archeological sites exist, like those at Canicab, Poxila and Ekmul.

After the conquest during the colonial period, the Municipality of Acanceh was founded as an encomienda in the second half of the sixteenth century. The most notable of the encomenderos were Francisco de Arceo and the Lady Ana Arguelles. Also during this period, a convent and Church to the Virgin of Guadalupe, and the Church of our Lady of the Nativity, were built in Acanceh.

In the nineteenth century, Acanceh changed jurisdiction numerous times. In 1825, it was part of the municipality of Mama; in 1837, was transferred to the municipality of Mérida; in 1840, it was joined with the municipality of Tecoh; in 1862 it returned to the Mérida Municipality; and finally in 1876, the State Congress granted the status of the village.

In the modern era, Governor Prisciliano Cortés granted Acanceh the rank of city in 1914, but that was revoked by Governor Salvador Alvarado when he declared official acts of the previous administration null and void. In 1918, the organic law of municipalities for the state of Yucatán declared Acanceh as a free municipality. On 20 December 1922, by Decree of the Socialist Governor Felipe Carrillo Puerto, land reform returned the land to the pueblo.

== Governance ==
The municipal president is elected for a three-year term. Nine aldermen also serve on the town council. There is a Secretary, and councilors of Heritage and patrimony; Education and Culture; Public Works; Public Security; Nomenclature; Parks and Public Gardens; Ecology; and Cemeteries.

== Communities ==
The municipality is made up of 6 communities:

Community	Population
Entire Municipality (2010)	15,3376
Acanceh	10,211 in 2005
Canicab	724 in 2005
Petectunich	558 in 2005
Sácchich	239 in 2005
Tepich Carrillo	824 in 2005
Ticopó	1584 in 2005

== Local festivals ==
Every year from 3 to 7 October Tepich holds the celebration in honor to the Virgin of the Rosary; from 14 to 17 August, in Petectunich they celebrate the Immaculate Conception; and from November 27 to December 12 is the festival of our Lady of Guadalupe.

== Tourist attractions ==
- Acanceh archeological site
- Hacienda Petectunich
- Hacienda Ticopó
