= Acanceh =

Town in the Mexican state of Yucatán

Acanceh, Yucatán
- Municipal seat
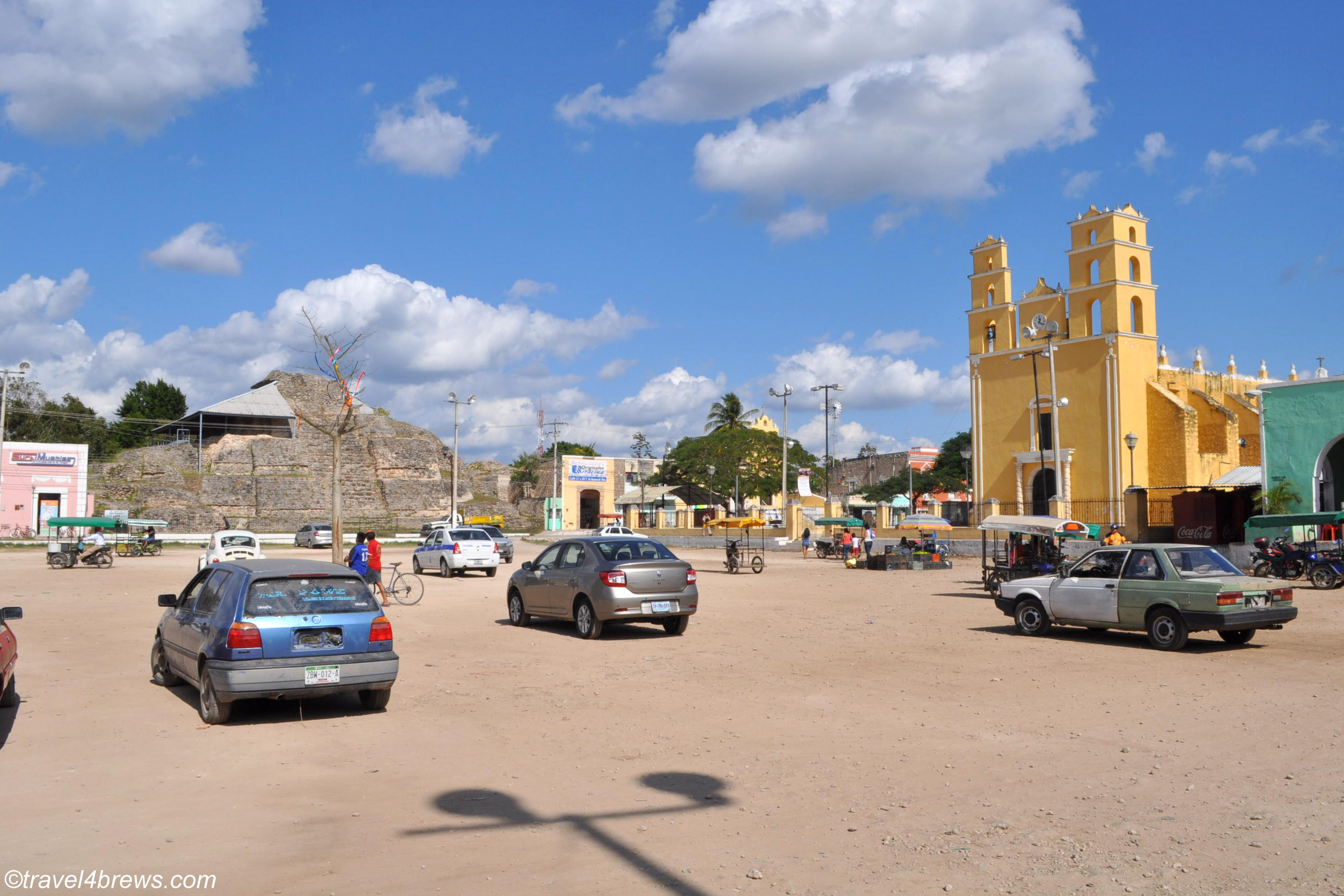
- Central square of Acanceh, with pre-Columbian pyramid, Colonial church, and more modern structures

- Location within Yucatán (state) Location within Mexico
- Coordinates: 20.813311°N 89.452448°W
- Country: Mexico
- State: Yucatán
- Municipality: Acanceh

Acanceh (Spanish pronunciation: [akanˈke]) is a town and ancient Maya archaeological site located in the Mexican state of Yucatán, 21 kilometres (13 mi) from the state capital at Mérida. It is the seat of the municipality of Acanceh. The modern town of Acanceh is partially atop the pre-Columbian site, and occupation seems to have been continuous. Acanceh means "groan of the deer" in the Yucatec Maya language.

The town of Acanceh has about 12,000 inhabitants. The area is historically Maya, but Yucatec Maya is now spoken by only about a quarter of the municipality's residents, nearly all of whom also speak Spanish.

== Ancient Acanceh ==
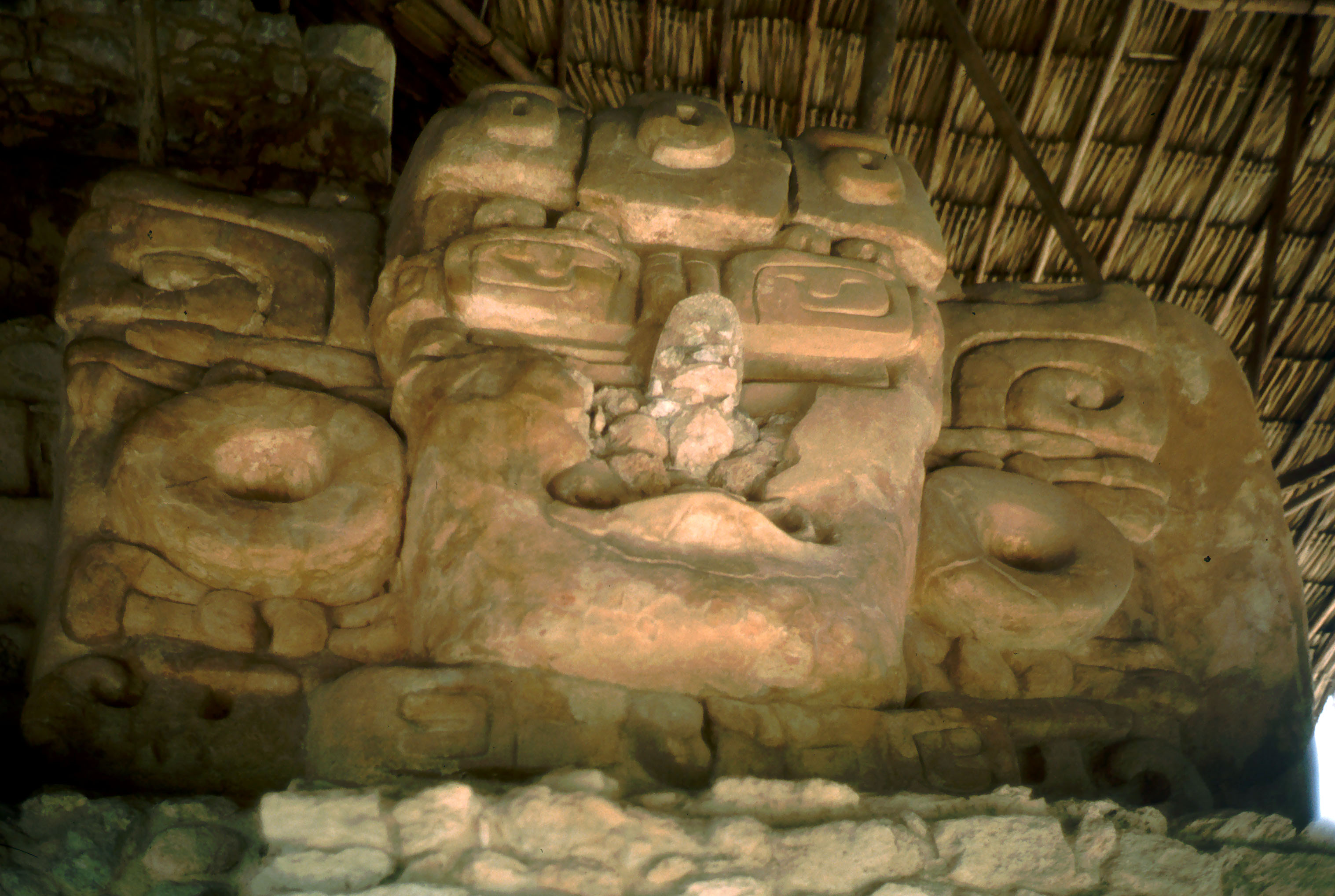
Preserved Pre-Columbian stucco face of Maya deity

Acanceh was founded sometime between 300 and 500 AD, during the Early Classic period, possibly by the Itzaes in their first migration from the east to the west of the Yucatán peninsula, having come from the lake area of Bacalar and having founded Chichen Itzá, Izamal and T'Hó (currently Mérida.)

In more recent times, before the arrival of the Spaniards, Acanceh was located within the jurisdiction (Kuchkabal) of the chakanes.

The ancient Maya city covered more than 4 km² and had about 400 buildings. Three of these buildings have been restored and are open to the public, although recent excavations have uncovered more structures. The three-leveled step pyramid in Acanceh is 11 meters high. One of the older layers of the pyramid has been uncovered revealing several distinctive carved masks as part of the pyramid's decoration. The "Palace of the Stuccos" is 50 meters wide, 6 meters high, and contains many elaborate friezes. This building's design is very complex, with many rooms and detailed carvings. The architecture of the structures at Acanceh show a Teotihuacano influence, leading some to believe it was a "colony" of Teotihuacan.
