= List of horse-drawn railways =

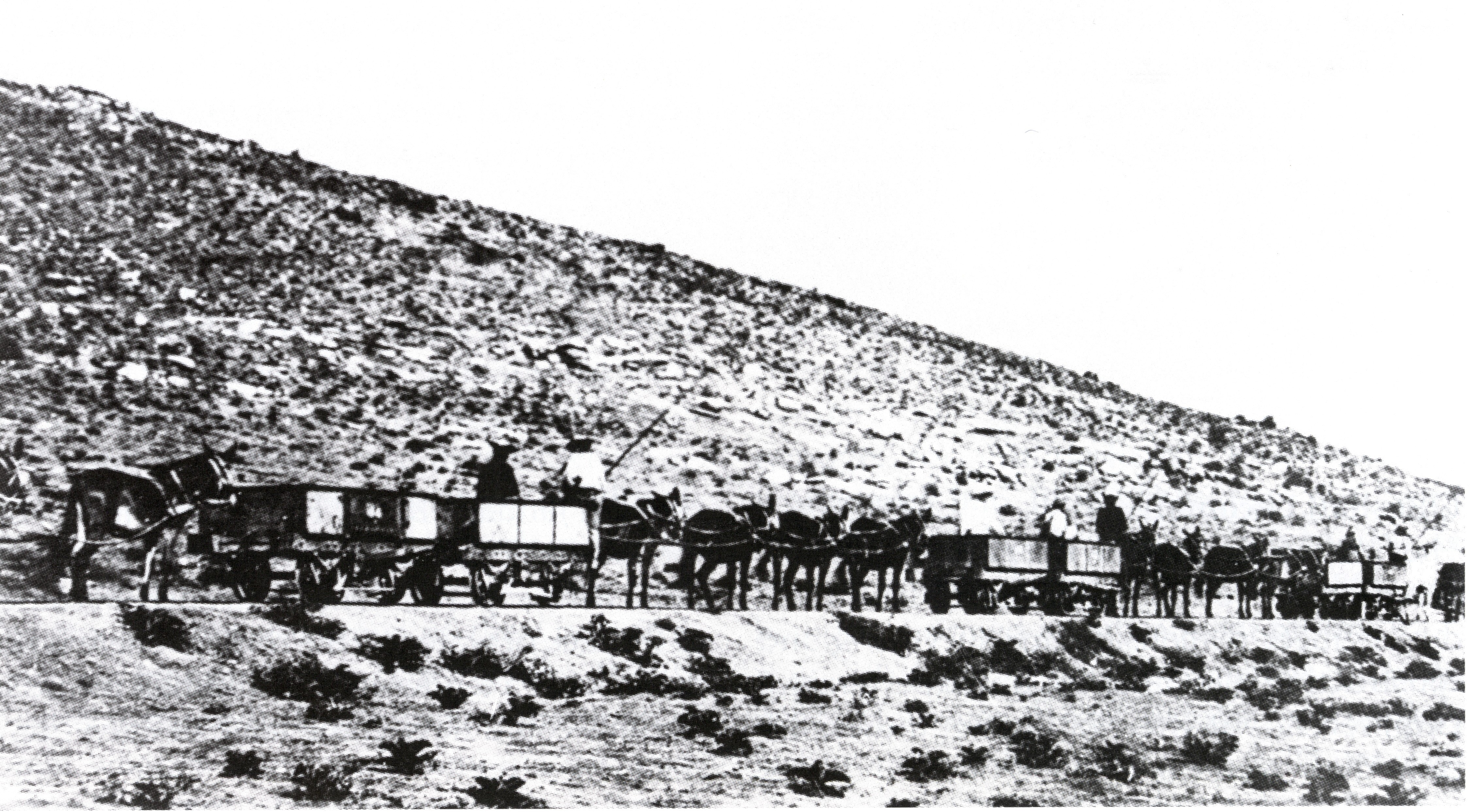
Namaqualand Railway mule train, c. 1876.

This is a selective worldwide list of horse-drawn railways, an early form of rail transport that utilised horses, mules and other similar animals to pull rail cars. Horses and mules were also used for shunting.

== Examples ==
=== Before 1800 ===
Horses were used to pull railways in funiculars and coal mines as early as the early 16th century. The earliest recorded example is the Reisszug, an inclined railway in Austria dating to 1515. Almost all of the mines built in the 16th and 17th centuries used horse-drawn railways as their only mode of transport.

=== 1800–1849 ===
Name	Years of operation	Gauge	Location	Image	Notes
Ticknall Tramway	1802–1913	4 ft 2 in (1,270 mm)	Ticknall, England		
Swansea & Mumbles Railway	1804–1877	1,435 mm (4 ft 8 1/2 in)	Swansea, Wales		The world's first passenger railway service. Later electrified
Leiper Railroad	1810–1828	4 ft (1,219 mm)	Delaware County, Pennsylvania		The first permanent tramway in America
Bryn Oer Tramway	1814–1861	3 ft 6 in (1,067 mm)	Talybont-on-Usk, Wales		
Hill's Tramroad	c. 1815 – c. 1926	2 ft (610 mm)	Llanfoist, Wales		
Hay Railway	1816–1860	1,067 mm (3 ft 6 in)/ 1,435 mm (4 ft 8 1/2 in)	Eardisley, England to Brecon, Wales		Converted from 1,067 mm (3 ft 6 in) gauge plateway to 1,435 mm (4 ft 8 1/2 in) gauge edgeway
Blaafarveværket	Opened c. 1820s		Norway		
Plymouth and Dartmoor Railway	1823–1888, 1860)	4 ft 6 in (1,372 mm)	Princetown, England		
Stockton and Darlington Railway	1825–1833	1,435 mm (4 ft 8 1/2 in)	Darlington, England		Operated with both horses and engines between 1825 and 1833
Granite Railroad	1826–1871	1,524 mm (5 ft)	Quincy, Massachusetts		
Saint-Étienne–Andrézieux railway	1827–	1,435 mm (4 ft 8 1/2 in)	France		
Budweis–Linz–Gmunden Horse-Drawn Railway	1828–	1,106 mm (3 ft 7 1/2 in)			The first public railway in continental Europe
Bavarian Ludwig Railway	1835–1863	1,435 mm (4 ft 8 1/2 in)	Fürth, Germany		
Whitby and Pickering Railway	Opened 1836	1,435 mm (4 ft 8 1/2 in)	Whitby, England		
Port Arthur, Tasmania Tramway	1836–				Human powered
Ffestiniog Railway	1836–1863	1 ft 11 1/2 in (597 mm)	Porthmadog, Wales		Horses hauled empty trains uphill, and rode down in dandy waggons under gravity power. Later replaced by steam locomotives.
Patent (1838–1844) G. Peppercorne					
Bratislava to Svätý Jur to Trnava Váh horse railway	1840 – 10 October 1872	1,435 mm (4 ft 8 1/2 in)	Now in Slovakia		
Bazias to Anina via Oravița	1846–1863		Present-day Romania		Used for coal transport to a port on the river Danube
Leith and Musselburgh Tramway	1841–		Scotland		

=== 1850–1879 ===
Name	Years of operation	Gauge	Location	Image	Notes
Fintona Railway	1853–1957	1,600 mm (5 ft 3 in)	Ireland (now Northern Ireland)		
Goolwa Port Elliot Railway	1854–1884	1,600 mm (5 ft 3 in)	South Australia		Extended to Victor Harbor and Strathalbyn by 1869. Used up to 16 horses, 29 to Strathalbyn
Treffry Tramways	1835–		Cornwall, England		Clay mining
	1861-?		Nelson, New Zealand		
Dun Mountain Railway	1861–1901	914 mm (3 ft)	New Zealand		
Wallaroo (smelter and port) to Moonta (mines) – tramway	1862–1890s		South Australia		
Port Macdonnell to Mount Gambier – proposal			South Australia		Proposed, but never built
Omaha Horse Railway	1867–1889		Omaha, Nebraska		
Port Wakefield Railway	1870–1876	1,067 mm (3 ft 6 in)	South Australia		Converted to locomotive haulage
Kingston-Naracoorte railway line	1871	1,067 mm (3 ft 6 in)	South Australia		Operated with horses for first six months after construction before locomotives were available
Ferrocarril de Antofagasta a Bolivia	1873–1876	762 mm (2 ft 6 in)	Chile		Mule-drawn
Douglas Bay Horse Tramway	1876–present	3 ft (914 mm)	Douglas, Isle of Man		Shires and Clydesdales are used to pull a fleet of original tramcars along the seafront.
Port Broughton	1876–1926	1,067 mm (3 ft 6 in)	South Australia		Always isolated; locomotives proposed in 1906
Namaqualand Railway	opened 1869–1876	762 mm (2 ft 6 in)	South Africa		Steam followed gradually
Kailan – Lutai Canal	1878–1881		China		Mule-drawn for coal

=== After 1880 ===
Name	Years of operation	Gauge	Location	Image	Notes
Horse Tramways in Fiji	1884–	762 mm (2 ft 6 in); 610 mm (2 ft)	Fiji		Some assisted by manpower. Cane tramways.
Spiekeroog tramways	1885-1949	4 ft 8 1/2 in (1,435 mm)	East Frisian Islands, Germany		The last horse-drawn railway in Germany. Horses were replaced by diesel locomotives on 31 May 1949
McKenzie Creek Tramway	1887–1925		Horsham, Victoria		Shire-operated, 8 kilometres (5 mi) long
Nasik Tramway	1889–1930s		India		
Bärschwil gypsum railway	1894–1952	2 ft (610 mm)	Switzerland		
Welshpool Jetty railway	1905–1941	2 ft 6 in (762 mm)	Port Welshpool, Victoria, Australia		
Finton Tramway	Closed 1957	1,600 mm (5 ft 3 in)	Ireland		
Gawler	1879–1931	5 ft 3 in (1,600 mm)	Gawler, South Australia		
Moonta			Yorke Peninsula, South Australia		

== Bibliography ==
- Discovering Britain's First Railways - A guide to Horse-drawn Tramroads and Waggonways, by Mark Jones. The History Press 2012. (144 pp). Map shows locations of 40 waggonways with a bibliography of 40 books.

== See also ==
- Corduroy road
- Horsecar
