= 1967 in rail transport =

This article lists events related to rail transport that occurred in 1967.

== Events ==
=== January events ===
- January – General Electric introduces the GE U30C.

=== February events ===
- February 21 – The last shunting horse to work on British Rail, "Charlie" at Newmarket, is retired.

=== March events ===
- March 1 – Hankyū Senri Line, Osaka, Japan, opens.
- March 6 – Railways between Cambridge and Sudbury via Haverhill are closed by the Eastern Region of British Rail following the Beeching Report.
- March 20 – British Rail reopens the remaining section of line on the Isle of Wight, from Ryde Pier Head to Shanklin, after electrification to the Southern Region standard (750 V DC third rail) using former London Underground "Tube" stock.
- March 24 – Soo Line Railroad discontinues passenger train operations.
- March 24 – Tanimachi Line, Osaka, Japan, opens.
- March 29 - In Tokyo, Japan, Tozai Line is extended from Toyocho to Nishi-Funabashi.

=== April events ===
- April 1 – The United States National Transportation Safety Board (NTSB) begins work.
- April 20 – The Interstate Commerce Commission grants its initial approval of the proposed CNW/CGW merger.

=== May events ===
- May 23 – GO Transit, Canada's first interregional public transit system, begins operations in Southern Ontario.

=== July events ===
- The Seaboard Air Line and Atlantic Coast Line railroads merge to form the Seaboard Coast Line railroad.
- July 3 – Closure of Nottingham Victoria Railway Station, Nottingham, UK
- July 9 - Cessation of steam operation on the Southern Region of British Railways.
- July 19 – The New York City Subway introduces its first air conditioned passenger car.
- July 25 – Construction begins in San Francisco, on the Market Street subway.

=== August events ===
- August 5 – The Illinois Central Railroad discontinues the Land O'Corn passenger train.

=== September events ===
- September – United States Postal Service announces cancellation of most Railway Mail Service contracts.
- September – Grand Trunk Railway ends passenger service between Montreal and Portland, Maine.
- September 14 – Tōyōchō Station, in Kōtō, Tokyo Prefecture, Japan, opens.
- September 30 – The Monon Railroad ceases all passenger train operations. Its last train is the Chicago–Louisville Thoroughbred.

=== October events ===
- October 2 – Canadian Pacific Railway removes the diamond crossing at Bedell, Ontario, the junction of the railway's Winchester and Prescott subdivisions.
- October 5 – The Chicago, Milwaukee, St. Paul and Pacific Railroad (the "Milwaukee Road") discontinues the Arrow passenger train.
- October 28 – Canadian Pacific Railway moves the last of its equipment out of its Ottawa West yard to the new Walkley Yard.

=== November events ===
- November 27 - Chrystie Street Connection opens on the New York City Subway, connecting the IND Sixth Avenue Line to the Manhattan Bridge

=== December events ===
- December 3 – The New York Central's 20th Century Limited is discontinued just before the railroad's merger with the Pennsylvania Railroad to form the Penn Central.
- December 10 – The Pennsylvania Railroad discontinues its all-Pullman (sleeping car) Broadway Limited, and assigns the train's name and much of its services to the General on the same New York-Chicago run, adding coaches and a separate dining car for coach passengers.
- December 20
  - The Pennsylvania Railroad achieves its highest speed on their New York Division (a.k.a. Northeast Corridor) while operating one of their Turbo Liners.
  - In Tokyo, Japan, the Chiyoda Line is opened between Kita-Senju and Otemachi.
- December 29 – The first steam locomotive powered train operates at Illinois Railway Museum using a Shay locomotive.

=== Unknown date events ===
- Southern Pacific Railroad opens the longest stretch of new railroad construction in a quarter century as the first trains roll over the Palmdale Cutoff through Cajon Pass.
- The Central Railroad of New Jersey declares bankruptcy.
- General Motors Electro-Motive Division introduces the EMD FP45.
- English Electric supplies first batch of CP Class 1400 diesel-electric locomotives from its Vulcan Foundry to Caminhos de Ferro Portugueses, its first mainline locomotive export order for continental Europe.
- D. William Brosnan is succeeded by W. Graham Claytor as president of the Southern Railway (US).
- Cessation of steam operation on the Eastern Region of British Railways.

== Accidents ==
- February 28 – Stechford rail crash on British Rail at Stechford railway station in Birmingham: a diesel locomotive collides with a passenger train as a result of a shunting error, killing the driver and 8 passengers and injuring 16.
- March 5 – Connington South rail crash on the British Rail East Coast Main Line near Conington, Huntingdonshire: 5 passengers killed and 18 injured as the result of a deliberate act by the signalman.
- June 18 – A home-made bomb explodes on a Hyōgo-Himeji local commuter train at Shioya Station on the Sanyo Electric Railway Main Line, Kobe, Hyōgo, Japan. No one claims responsibility in this case, which kills two persons with 29 wounded.
- July 31 – Thirsk rail crash on the British Rail East Coast Main Line at Thirsk: an express train collides with a derailed freight. 7 passengers are killed, 45 injured, and prototype diesel locomotive DP2 is written off.
- November 5 – Hither Green rail crash on the Southern Region of British Rail in south-east London: derailment caused by a broken rail; 49 killed.

== Deaths ==
=== May deaths ===
- May 13 – Eric Treacy, English railway photographer, former Anglican bishop (born 1907).

=== December deaths ===
- December – Wayne A. Johnston, president of Illinois Central Railroad 1945–1966 (born 1897).
