= Dandy waggon =

Type of railway carriage used to carry horses on gravity trains

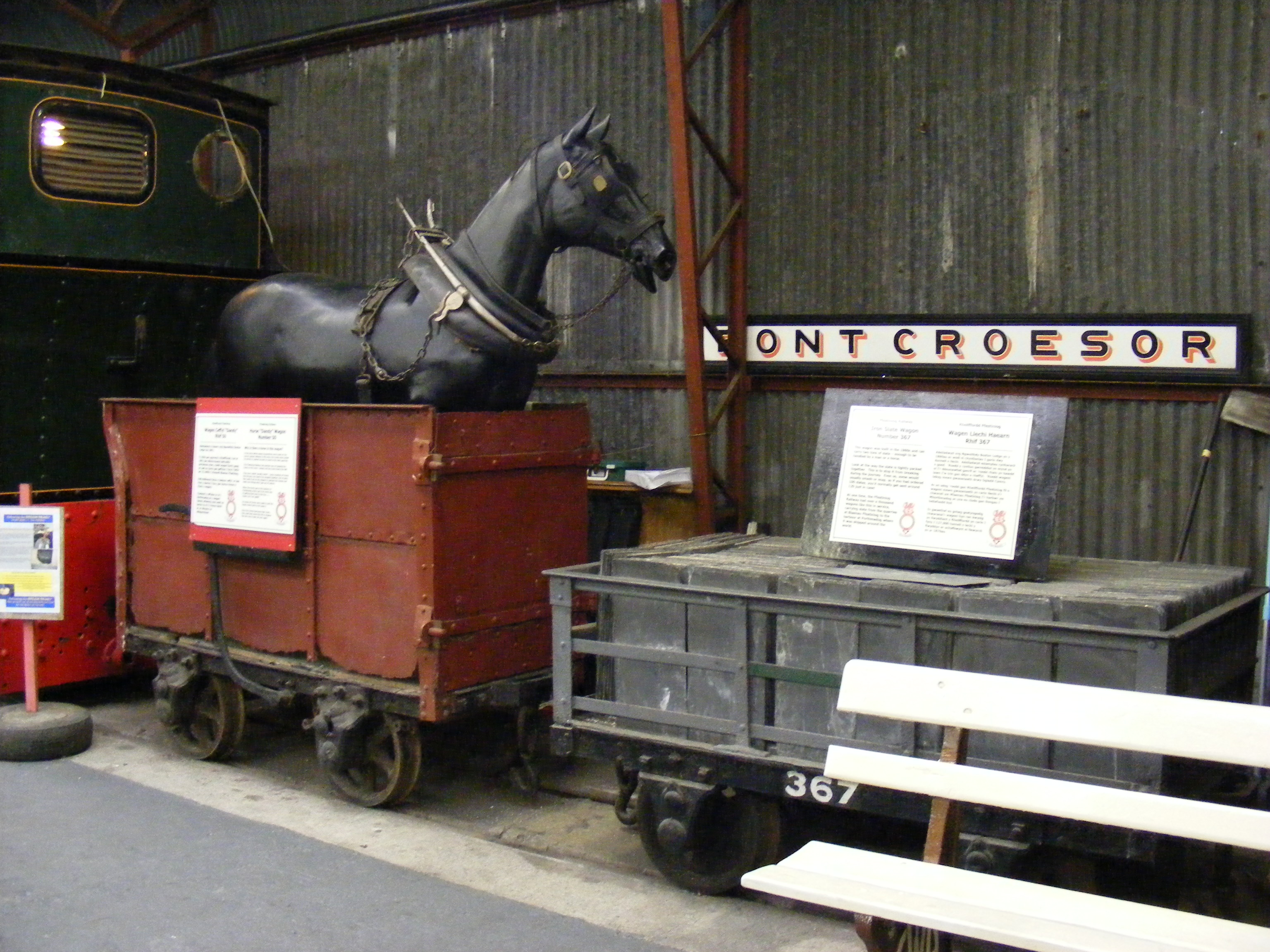
A dandy waggon from the Ffestiniog Railway on display at the Welsh Highland Heritage Railway in North Wales (2009)

The dandy waggon is a type of railway carriage used to carry horses on gravity trains. They are particularly associated with the narrow gauge Festiniog Railway (FR) in Wales where they were used between 1836 and 1863.

== The challenge ==
The challenge on the FR was to move slate from an elevated location to a harbour for shipping, in this case from Blaenau Ffestiniog to Porthmadog, Wales. In 2006 this is a 28-minute drive over 11.9 miles (19.1 kilometers), but in 1832 it was a remote mountain area. The railway was laid on an average grade of about 1 in 80 (1.25%). Trains running downhill were powered by gravity, with 3 stops. The total journey time was about an hour and a half. Trains were moved uphill by horses until 1863, the journey taking almost 6 hours. It was therefore necessary to find a way to bring the horses back down again.

== Horse dandies ==
George Stephenson is credited for having proposed a solution: build special cars for the horses to ride in on the way down for use on the Stockton and Darlington Railway that opened in 1825. By 1827 the Stockton and Darlington Railway was in difficulties with its unreliable steam locomotives, and was on the point of giving them up. They returned to using horse-drawn vehicles operated by independent contractors. Each horse was expected to haul some twelve-and-a-half tons of coal, making three round trips in six days. The work was exhausting for them and they soon became lame.

Stephenson introduced the dandy wagon in 1828, which was simply a four-wheeled cart supplied with hay, attached to the rear of a four-chaldron train in which the horse could rest on the downhill sections. It was said that if the dandy wagon was missing the horse would try to jump onto the rearmost coal truck.

On the FR this gave the horses a chance to eat and rest on the way down, and after the slate cars were unloaded refreshed horses were available to haul the empty cars back to the top. On other railways the downhill horse haulage was generally shorter, occurring only along some areas of the track, but still allowed the horses a rest before going back to work.

According to the Traveller's Guide (Blue Cover) Wagon number 50, a 4-wheel Iron Horse Dandy built at Boston Lodge c. 1861, was still in existence and stored at the Ffestiniog Railway museum as of April 1992.

Other names for horse-carrying cars are "dandy cart" and "dandy truck": they all refer to a vehicle on a horse-worked railway that a horse pulls to the top of the hill and rides down the hill in. The term "dandy cart" is also used to refer to horse-drawn passenger trains on occasion.

== Horse-drawn trains ==
Almost all early railways used horses as the motive power for trains before the invention of the steam locomotive.

The Ballochney Railway used a "dandy-cart" on the two "Ballochney Inclines" each having a grade of around 1 in 23 for distances of about 1,000 yd (910 m). A descending train was connected by rope and pulley to an ascending train; the weight of the downhill train pulled the up hill train up the hill.

The geography of the Ffestiniog Railway may have had some impact on allowing this imaginative solution to be applied to a large percentage of its total haulage; a relatively long section of track, running exclusively between two points, where a relatively constant and continuous downhill grade could be maintained.

== Another proposal for dandy waggons ==
In 1828 Alfred Pocock, who was developing a non-rail horseless carriage propelled by a kite(s), proposed on a particular trip that the kite carriage should tow a dandy-cart to carry a pony in the event of the wind being unfavorable.

== Spelling of "wagon" or "waggon" ==
In the UK, in the early days of rail and tramways, either spelling was acceptable. In the UK, today, in national rail operations, the spelling is "wagon". Within the Festiniog (note 1 F), during the 19th century the spelling was interchangeable. For commonality, now, a single g is often used. However, it is still common to use "waggon" to refer to goods stock.

== Other dandy wagons ==
The term Dandy Wagon (regionally correct spelling) referred to a horse-drawn private buggy used in America during the 1800s.

== See also ==
- List of horse-drawn railways
