= West Island (disambiguation) =

West Island refers to the municipalities at the western end of the Island of Montreal, in Quebec, Canada.

West Island may also refer to:

== Australia ==
- West Island, Cocos (Keeling) Islands, island group in the Indian Ocean
- West Island (Lacepede Islands)
- West Island (South Australia), an island south of the Fleurieu Peninsula
  - West Island Conservation Park, a protected area in South Australia
  - West Island Encounter Bay Aquatic Reserve, a protected area in South Australia
- West Island, Torres Strait, Queensland

== India ==
- West Island (Andaman and Nicobar Islands) a protected wildlife island in the Bay of Bengal among Andaman and Nicobar Islands

== New Zealand ==
- West Island, one of the Three Kings Islands, 55 kilometres (34 mi) northwest of Cape Reinga
- West Island, a humorous nickname for Australia used in New Zealand

== United States ==
- West Island (California), an island on the San Joaquin River that is north of Antioch, California.
- West Island (Massachusetts), an island in Buzzards Bay.
- West Island (New York), an island on the Long Island Sound on the North Shore of Long Island in New York (state).
- West Island (Rhode Island), an island in Newport County.
