= National War Memorial (South Australia) =

War memorial in Adelaide, South Australia

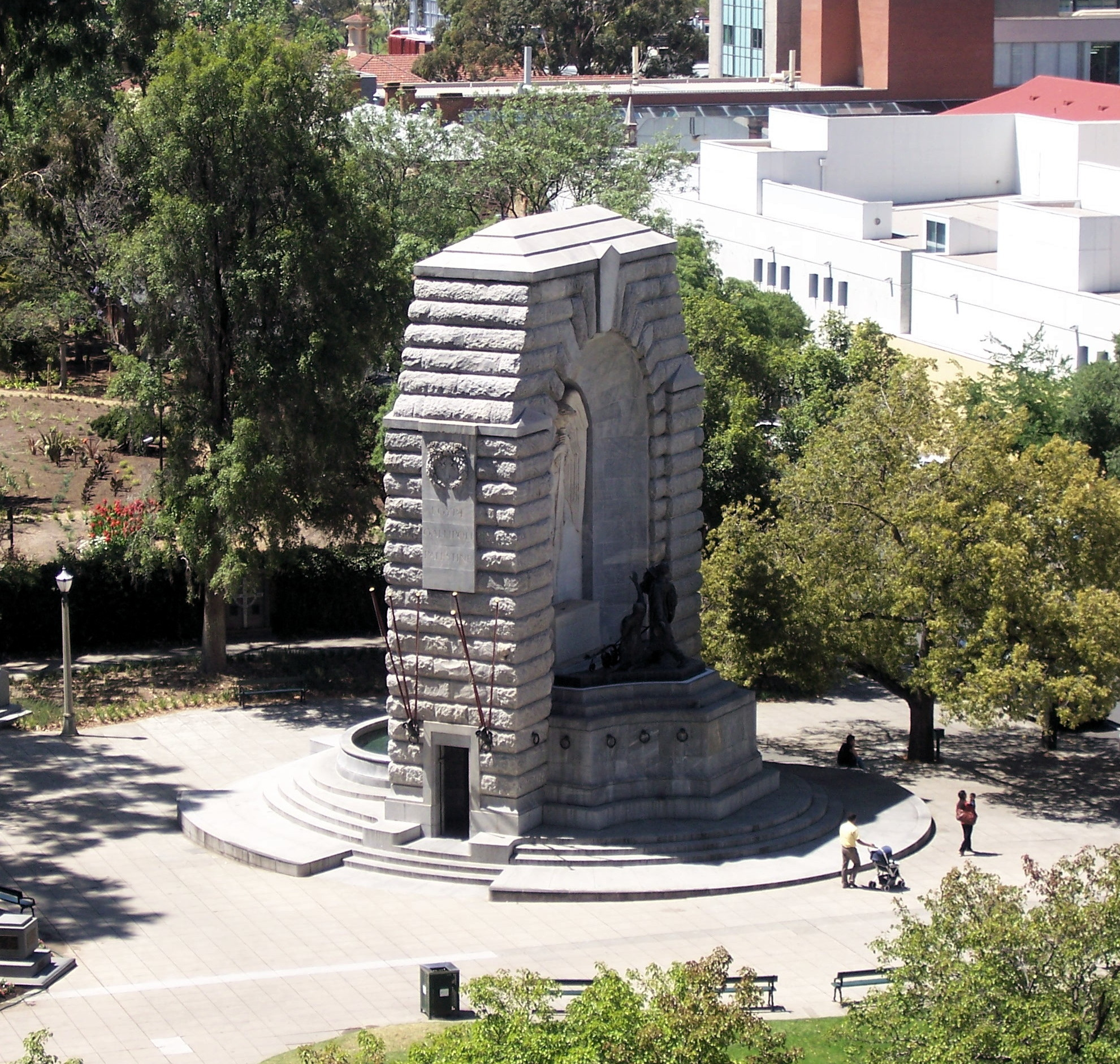
- For South Australians who served in World War I and those who gave their lives
- Unveiled: 25 April 1931
- Location: 34°55′15.77″S 138°36′5.48″E
- Designed by: Louis Laybourne Smith and Walter Bagot (architects) and Rayner Hoff (sculptor)

The National War Memorial is a monument on the north edge of the city centre of Adelaide, the capital of South Australia. It commemorates South Australians who served in the First World War and those who gave their lives. It was opened in 1931. The memorial is on the corner of North Terrace and Kintore Avenue, next to the grounds of Government House. Observances are held at the site throughout the year, with major services on Anzac Day (25 April) and Remembrance Day (11 November).

== Themes ==
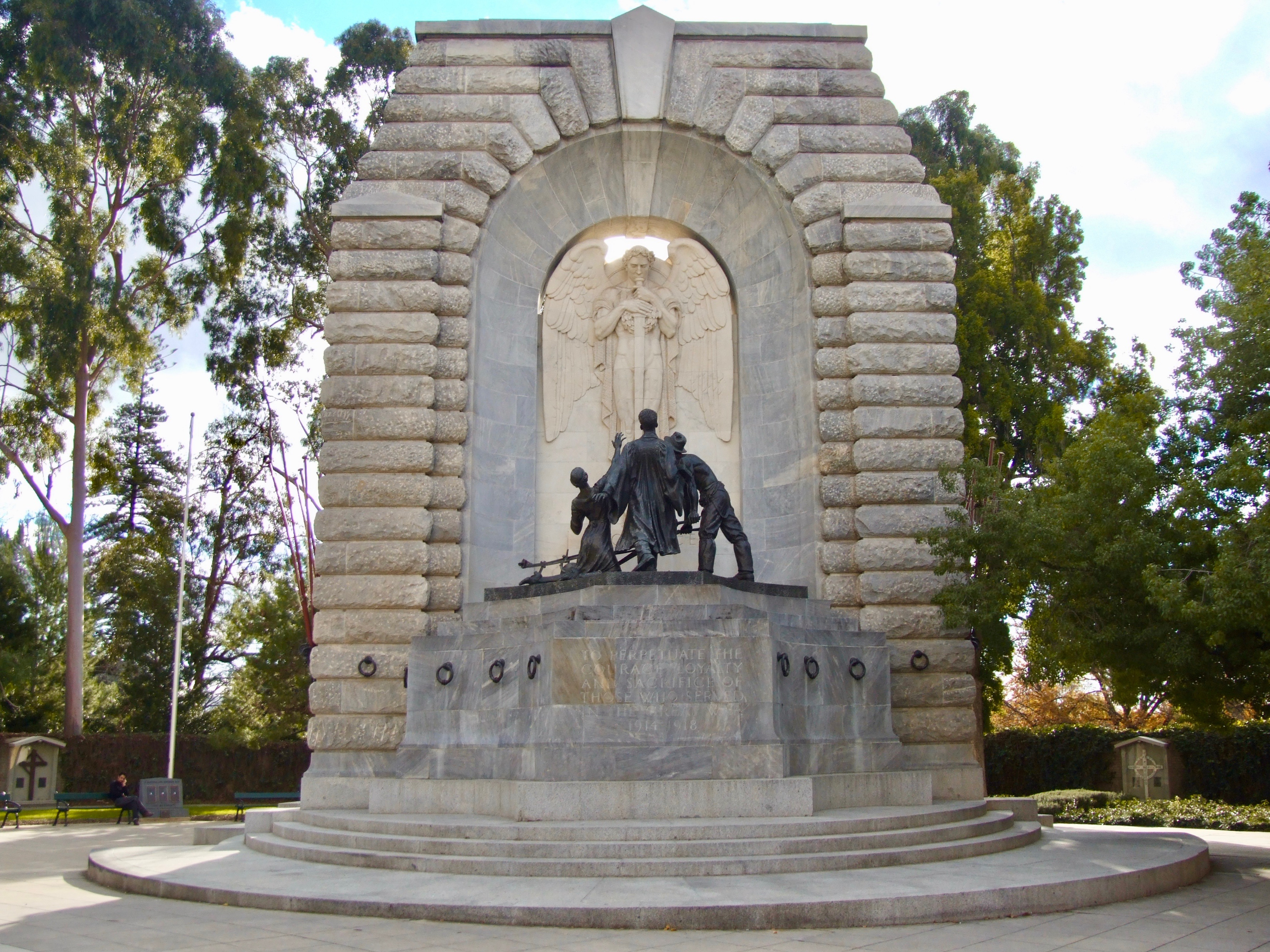
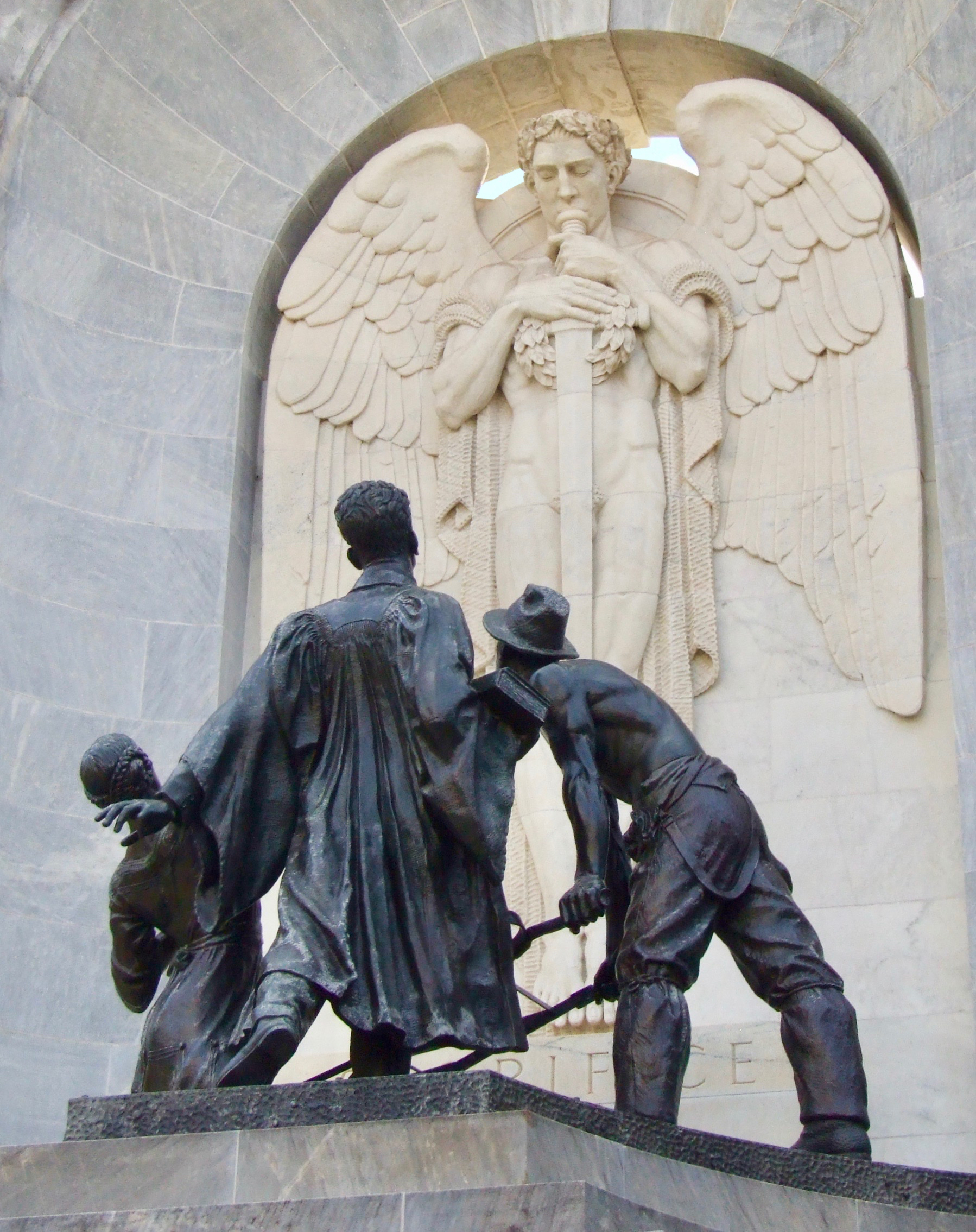
- Obverse side of the memorial Sculpted figures on the obverse side

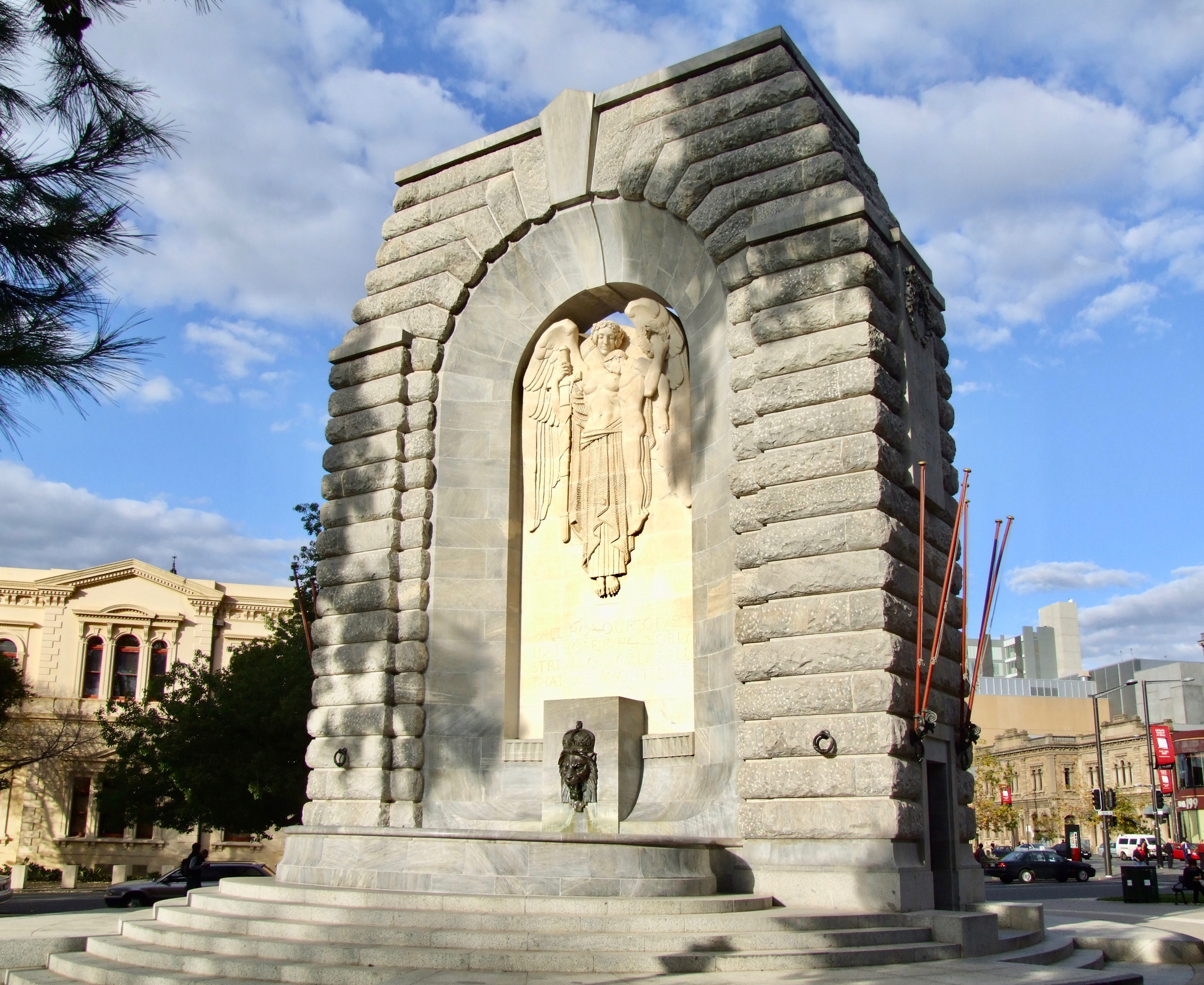
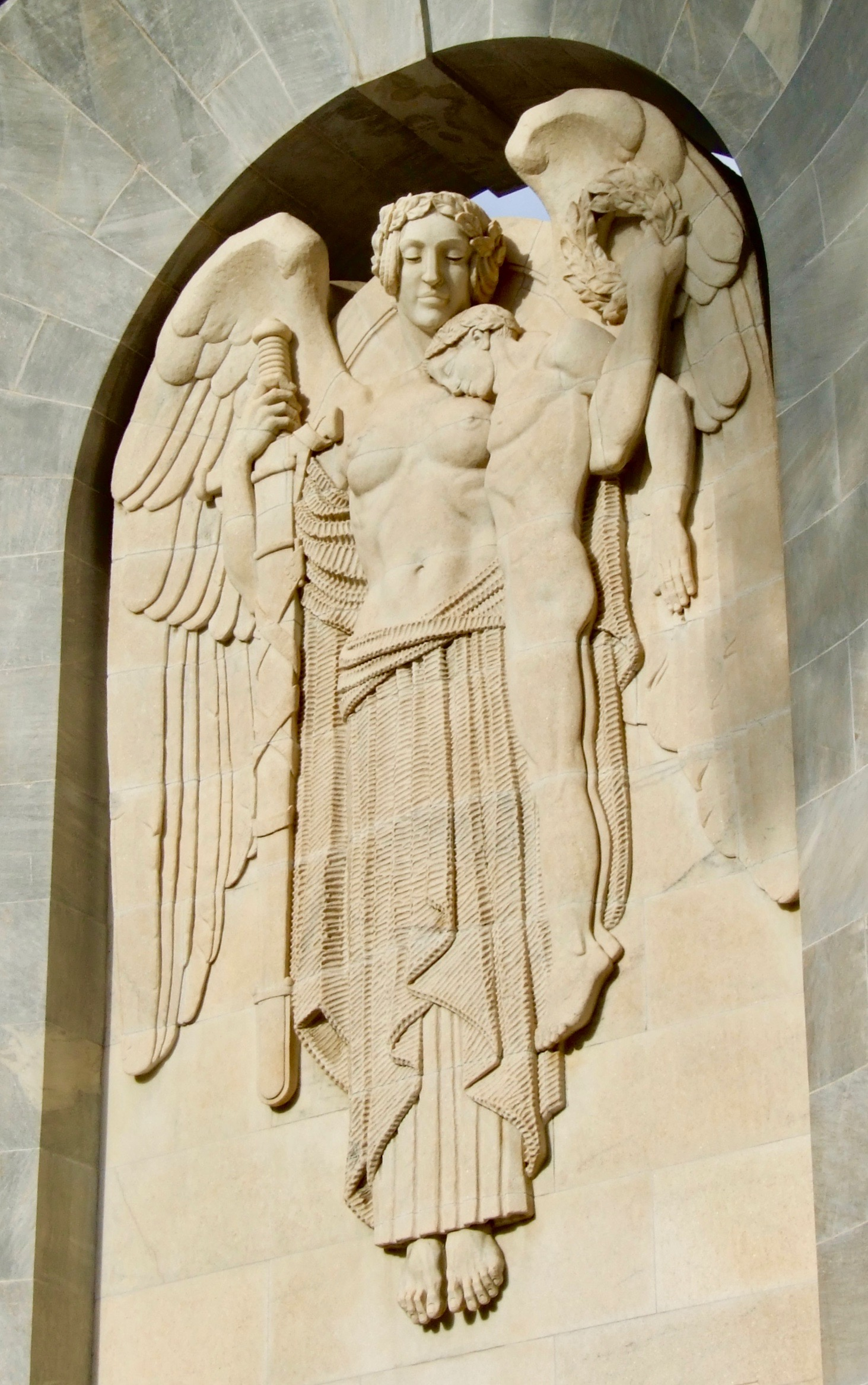
- Reverse side of the memorial Sculpted figures on the reverse side

The two themes of the monument – one visible on each side – show respectively the prelude and the epilogue to war, exemplifying both the willingness of youth to answer the call of duty and the sacrifices they had to make. Symbols of war itself and its participants are left out. This symbolism, according to the designers, does not represent victory in the traditional sense but a spiritual victory, in which is displayed a "willingness to serve and to sacrifice":

It is the collective personal sacrifice of victory over self which is expressed in the ... two scenes. The renunciation of all that made life sweet, of life itself, by the men who enlisted, toiled, fought, and died; by the women who waited, worked, succoured, and suffered.

== History ==
First proposed in 1919, the memorial was funded by the Parliament of South Australia, making it the first Australian state war memorial to be confirmed after the war. The design was selected through two architectural competitions. The first competition, in 1924, produced 26 designs – all of which were lost before judging could be completed after fire destroyed the building in which they were housed. A second competition, in 1926, produced 18 entries, out of which the design by the architectural firm Woods, Bagot, Jory & Laybourne-Smith was selected as the winner.

Almost 35,000 South Australians served in the First World War. This number amounted to 8.5% of the South Australian population at the time, or 37.7% of men between the ages of 18 and 44. Of those who served, more than 5,000 South Australians died. In response to these deaths, Archibald Peake, the premier of South Australia, asked the state parliament to fund a memorial commemorating the victory and the sacrifice of those who had fought and fallen. The motion, presented in March 1919, received unanimous support in the House of Assembly and the Legislative Council. With the passing of this motion, the South Australian Government became the first in Australia to elect to build a memorial to the soldiers of the First World War.

Parliament decided that the new memorial should be referred to as the "National War Memorial", even though it was to be a purely South Australian monument and in spite of the term already being used to describe the memorial to the South African War of 1899–1902. At least two perspectives have been offered as to why the term "national" was employed. First, as Donald Richardson observed, the name may have been chosen to emphasise the government's intention that the memorial should commemorate all who served during the war, not just those who came from South Australia; and second, Ken Inglis argued that the name may have reflected the perception (still held in spite of federation) that the "province (Note: That is, South Australia.) is a nation".

=== 1924 competition ===
The National War Memorial Committee was formed in order to bring the proposal to fruition, and in February 1924 the committee announced an architectural competition to find the design of the new memorial. In the preamble to the conditions of entry, it was stated that the new memorial was to serve the purpose of "perpetually commemorating the Victory achieved in the Great War, 1914–1918, the Supreme and personal sacrifice of those who participated in that War, and the National effort involved in such activities".

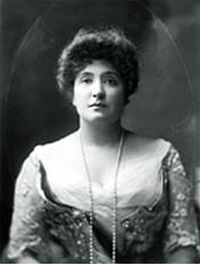
Renowned singer Dame Nellie Melba proposed building a carillon of bells as the new memorial

Entry was open to South Australians who were British subjects. A one-guinea entry fee was imposed, and those intending to submit designs were required to file a statement of intent before 29 February 1924. The competition closed on 30 September 1924. Three assessors were nominated to judge the entries: the South Australian Architect-in-Chief, A. E. Simpson; local architect Herbert Louis Jackman (representing the South Australian Institute of Architects); and Sir William Sowden.

The committee specified a budget of £25,000; figures of both £5,000 and £100,000 had been discussed. The conditions of entry stated that the memorial was to be situated at the entrance to Government House on the corner of King William Street and North Terrace, placing it just behind the existing memorial to the South African War. This location was counter to previous suggestions: a 1919 survey of architects had proposed that the memorial should be built on Montefiore Hill, and in 1923 the plans involved erecting it at the rear of Government House rather than at the front.

The committee left open the form that the memorial would take, beyond stating that the memorial was not to be "utilitarian in character". Debate over the form led to the emergence of a number of suggestions, many of which were covered in the media of the day. These included Dame Nellie Melba's proposal to build a carillon of bells; a suggestion by Simpson Newland to turn Anzac Highway into a "Way of Honour" by adding triumphal arches to each end; and Walter Charles Torode's plan to build a "metal and marble" monument, 30 metres (98 feet) high, on the top of Mount Lofty with an electric car to carry people to the summit.

Eventually a total of 28 architectural firms registered their intent to submit entries to the competition – a lower number than expected, possibly on account of work on proposals for the new Adelaide railway station. 26 firms submitted designs by the deadline. On 10 November 1924, before judging could be completed, the Richards Building in Currie Street was destroyed by fire, taking with it all 26 proposals.

Although most of the judging had been completed before the fire, it was suggested that the committee could use what they had learned from the entrants to propose a new competition with greater clarity about the requirements led to naught. However, a 1925 letter to the Premier, John Gunn, stated that little was to be learned from the competition, since the assessors had found that none of the designs was suitable.

=== 1926 competition ===
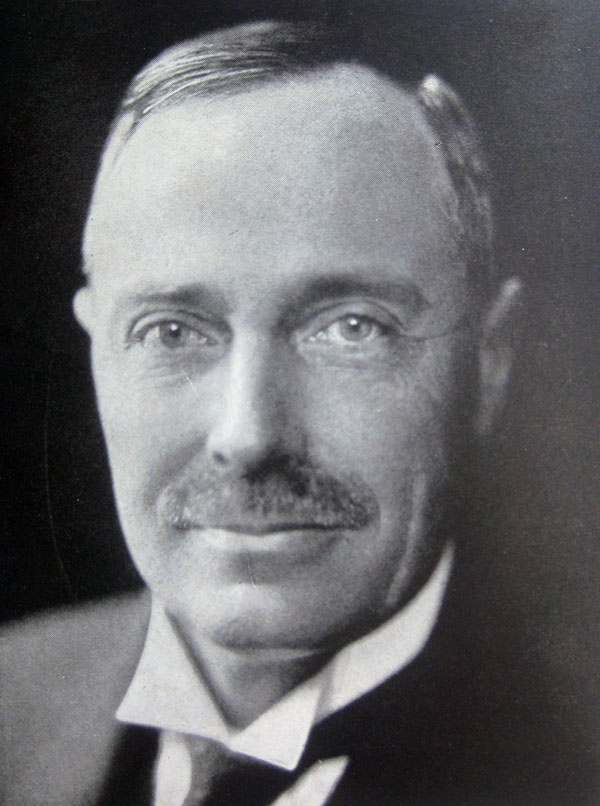
Louis Laybourne Smith, the architect who, with Walter Bagot and Rayner Hoff, was largely responsible for the winning design

Little progress had been made on the memorial by 1926. Although some debate occurred about the form the memorial would take, the focus of discussions was on the location of the memorial, the future of Government House and the role of the Governor. Several left-wing politicians argued that the grounds of Government House should be turned over to the State and used to build the memorial; conservatives desired to retain the status quo. By 1925 the committee was prepared to accept the Government House grounds as the site of the memorial, but delayed making an announcement. This proved to be fortuitous since legal issues prevented the plan from going ahead. Instead, a portion of the grounds, located at the corner of North Terrace and Kintore Avenue, was put aside for the purpose. (Note: The plan to move the governor and to use the grounds as part of a larger war memorial was revisited more 80 years later, in 2007.)

In 1926, after pressure from returned soldiers, a second competition was announced. Once again the budget was set at £25,000. As with the first competition, all entrants had to be South Australian British subjects, and all entries were to be judged anonymously, but this time there was to be only one assessor: John Smith Murdoch, chief architect for the Commonwealth of Australia. In deference to the previous competition, the top five entrants from 1924 were each given £75 on their submission of a new design, and all of the designs were insured by the government for £100 each.

With entries restricted to South Australians, only 18 designs were received – a figure that was "correspondingly fewer" than those received in other states where the competitions were open to all Australians. Nevertheless, in his Assessor's Report, Murdoch acknowledged that the quality of some of the proposals was such that they "probably would not have been exceeded had the competition been more open". After examining the submissions, on 15 January 1927, the design by Louis Laybourne Smith, (one of the principals of the architectural firm Woods, Bagot, Jory & Laybourne–Smith) was selected by Murdoch as the winner.

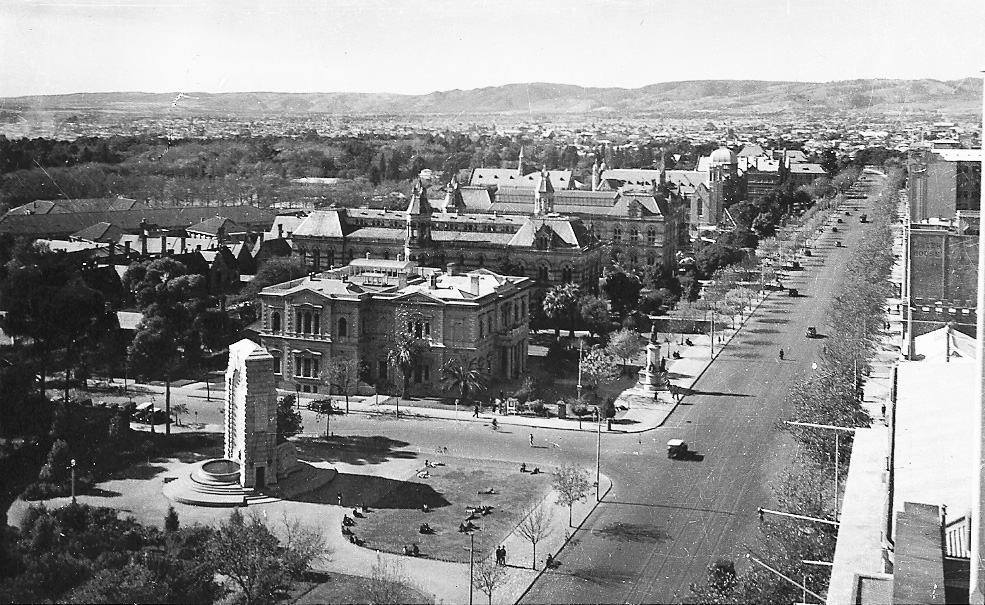
View of North Terrace, looking east, circa 1940, with the memorial in the foreground

Woods, Bagot, Jory & Laybourne-Smith had entered the 1924 competition with an arch designed by Walter Bagot, but in 1926 Bagot was away in Europe. Thus Laybourne Smith was responsible for drawing and submitting the final design, although he was clear to highlight the role Bagot played in the "architectural conception" of the monument. Although the firm was to be awarded 6% of the cost of the memorial, the principals refused all but enough to cover their own expenses, asking instead that residues (approximately £1000) be placed in a trust fund to pay for the upkeep of the work. Although this was seen as an altruistic act, Laybourne Smith was both a member of the National War Committee and sat on the sub-committee that drafted the rules of the competition, and thus it may have been considered "improper" to accept the money.

When announced to the public, the design was "universally hailed as a masterpiece". Nevertheless, in writing his report on the result of the judging, Murdoch stated of the winning architect that he "depends almost entirely on the sculptor to tell the story of the memorial, employing in his design no more architecture than that required to successfully frame and set his sculptural subjects, and to provide accommodation to the extent asked for by the conditions". This view was echoed by Inglis, who described the architecture as "essentially a frame for statuary" – an approach that he felt was "unusual" for an architect. As a result of this dependency on the sculpture, some of the other contestants expressed concerns, arguing that the contest was about architectural works rather than sculptural ones, even though the conditions of the competition specifically allowed for sculpture in the proposals.

=== Construction ===
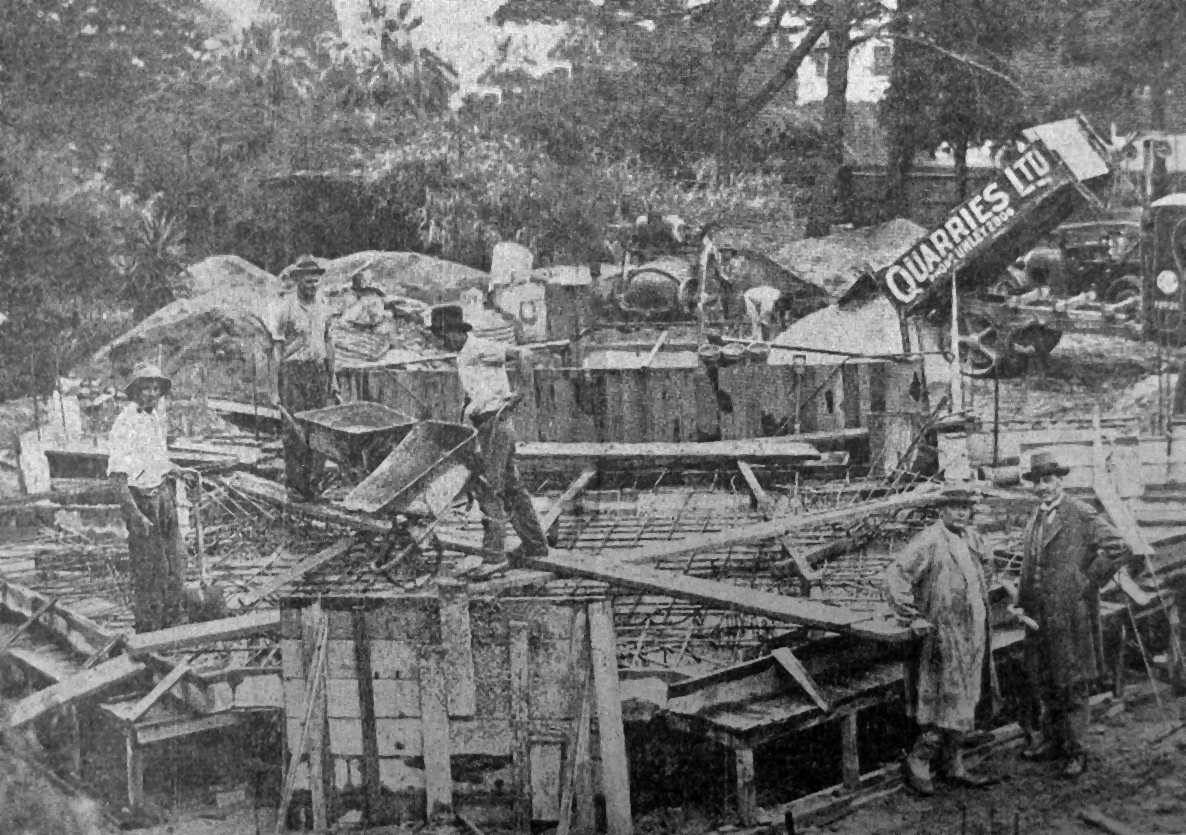
Early stage of construction, circa 1928

Construction of the memorial began in 1928 with the cutting and placement of marble blocks from Macclesfield and Angaston. The South Australian Monumental Works were chosen to work on the construction, with Alan Tillett as the principal. Although no sculptor was named in the winning proposal, it did make mention of a possible candidate, who later proved to be Rayner Hoff, a Sydney-based sculptor born in England. Hoff produced the designs for the sculptures from his Sydney studio; the bronze castings from Hoff's plaster models were produced by the South Australian firm A.W. Dobbie and Company. Hoff had expressed reservations that a South Australian company would be capable of handling bronzes of the required size, but a test casting of the lion's head from the memorial was sufficient to overcome his concerns. The two angel reliefs sculpted from the Angaston marble were produced by Julius Henschke in situ from Hoff's designs, expressed through one-third sized plaster models, which Henschke then scaled to suit.

Significant delays occurred during construction after a strike by the stonemasons, who were demanding a 44-hour week and to be paid at "outside rates": rates of pay for stonemasons were based on whether or not the work was to be constructed on site in the open air, or inside under cover. Tillett was paying the lower "inside rates", even though most of the work was to be conducted on the site. However, Tillett had tendered on the basis of a 48-hour week at inside rates, and paying extra would have caused significant financial problems. Tillett eventually won after the dispute went before the courts, but the strike had caused considerable financial damage to Tillett's company, which went into receivership in 1930 and stayed in that state until after the memorial was completed.

The South Australian Government had dedicated £25,000 to the memorial project. It was estimated that bulk of the expense would be masonry at £15,300, sculptural work £8,500 and landscaping £1,200. The final cost was about £30,000.

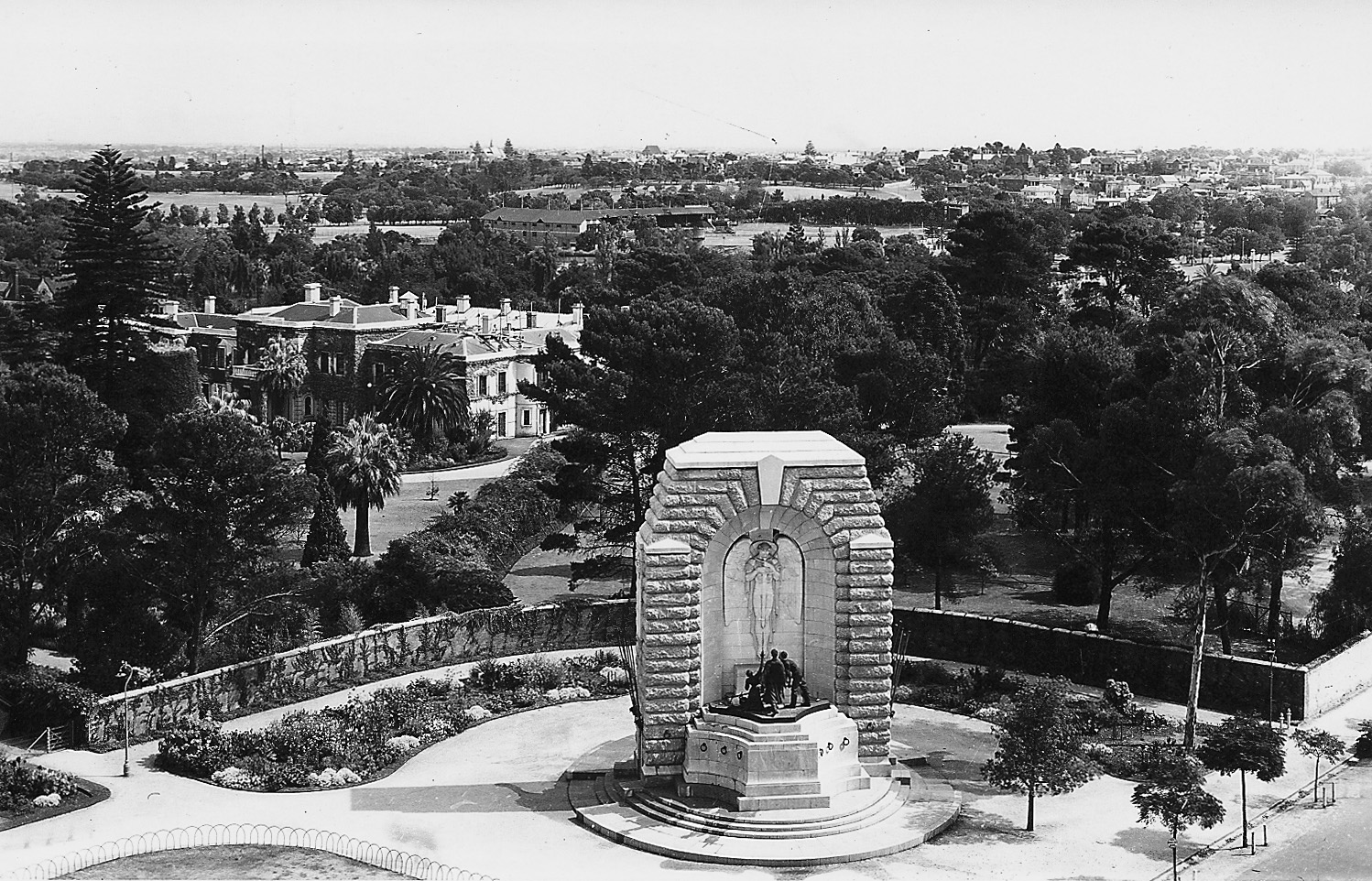
The memorial, circa 1940, showing its location in relation to Government House, visible on the left

=== Opening ===
The National War Memorial in South Australia became the fourth state World War I memorial to be opened when it was unveiled in 1931. Inglis notes that this is in keeping with the size of the constituency, arguing that "[t]he larger the constituency that each of these collective tributes had to represent, the later it was built". It was unveiled before a crowd of almost 75,000 on Anzac Day, 25 April 1931, (the 16th anniversary of the Gallipoli landing), by the Governor Sir Alexander Hore-Ruthven. The crowd, "as huge a crowd as anyone could remember assembling in the city", was unable to fit in front of the memorial, so many thousands assembled at the Cross of Sacrifice in Pennington Gardens to await a later ceremony. Hore-Ruthven was introduced by the acting state premier, Bill Denny MC, whose involvement in the unveiling, according to Inglis, was unusual for a Labor politician.

=== Commemorative activities ===
The first dawn service to be conducted at the memorial was held on Anzac Day 1935, and was attended by 200–300 people.

=== Restoration work ===
In 2001, the memorial's 70th anniversary year, a three-month remedial project was undertaken, restoring the bronze and stonework details and reinforcing the foundations. The work was completed just days before the Remembrance Day services. In 2002 the architects responsible for the restoration, Bruce Harry & Associates, were awarded a Heritage merit award for their work on the memorial by the Royal Australian Institute of Architects.

== Design ==
The rules of the competition limited the space for the memorial to the "one half acre" of land that was excised from the grounds of Government House. The design submitted by Woods, Bagot, Jory & Laybourne-Smith easily met this requirement, as the memorial was designed to fit on an ellipse with a major axis of 18.3 m (60 ft) in length and a minor axis of 15.5 m (51 ft). Standing at a height of over 14 m (46 ft), the structure was carefully placed back from North Terrace to provide space for "public gatherings of a ceremonial nature" and to allow for the proposed widening of the street.

The monument is effectively a frame for two scenes – the prologue and the epilogue of war – depicted through Rayner Hoff's marble reliefs and bronze statues. The two sides were referred to by the architects as the reverse and the obverse of the work, which they likened to the two sides of a coin. Each scene is a relief carved from Angaston marble and framed by the "rough-hewn" arch carved out of marble from Macclesfield; the granite steps leading up to the monument are constructed of granite from Harcourt, Victoria, as specified in the original proposal. (The architects had preferred the local West Island granite, but acknowledged that Harcourt granite was "the best available" unless the government would agree to reopen the quarry on West Island). The materials were chosen in order to provide continuity with Parliament House, located a short distance away along North Terrace.

To represent the prologue to the war, the obverse of the monument (the side facing North Terrace) features a relief of the Spirit of Duty appearing as a vision before the youth of South Australia, represented in the work by a sculptural group consisting of a young woman, a student and a farmer abandoning the "symbols of their craft". The three are depicted in normal dress, as they are not yet soldiers and are currently unprepared for the war that is to come, and they are facing away from the world as they look to the vision before them. In Bagot's original plan, submitted for the 1924 competition, there was to be but a single nude figure kneeling before the vision (for which Bagot posed while in Europe), but Laybourne Smith's 1926 submission became grander in its scope. In addition, Bagot's original designs were naturalistic, with the Spirit of Duty depicted as a female figure, but under Hoff's direction the figure was changed to male, and the style of the reliefs was changed to Art Deco – a "radically new" art style for Australia at the time. Hoff, however, presented the sculptural group in the original naturalistic style, thus providing a "bridge between the Renaissance-style architecture and the Art Deco of the reliefs".

On the reverse side of the monument, facing away from the traffic, is a relief carved into the marble representing the epilogue of the war and depicting the Spirit of Compassion as a winged spirit of womanhood bearing aloft a stricken youth. Beneath the figure is situated the Fountain of Compassion, the flow of water representing the "constant flow of memories"; the lion's head from which it emerges (which bears the Imperial Crown) is representative of the British Commonwealth of Nations.

The designers acknowledged that the symbolism – especially that of the reverse side – does not represent "victory" in the traditional sense. They stated that the "Arch of Triumph which was built in honour of a Caesar, a Napoleon, no longer expresses the feelings of modern democracy after an international struggle". Instead, the memorial represented a spiritual victory, in which was displayed a "willingness to serve and to sacrifice".

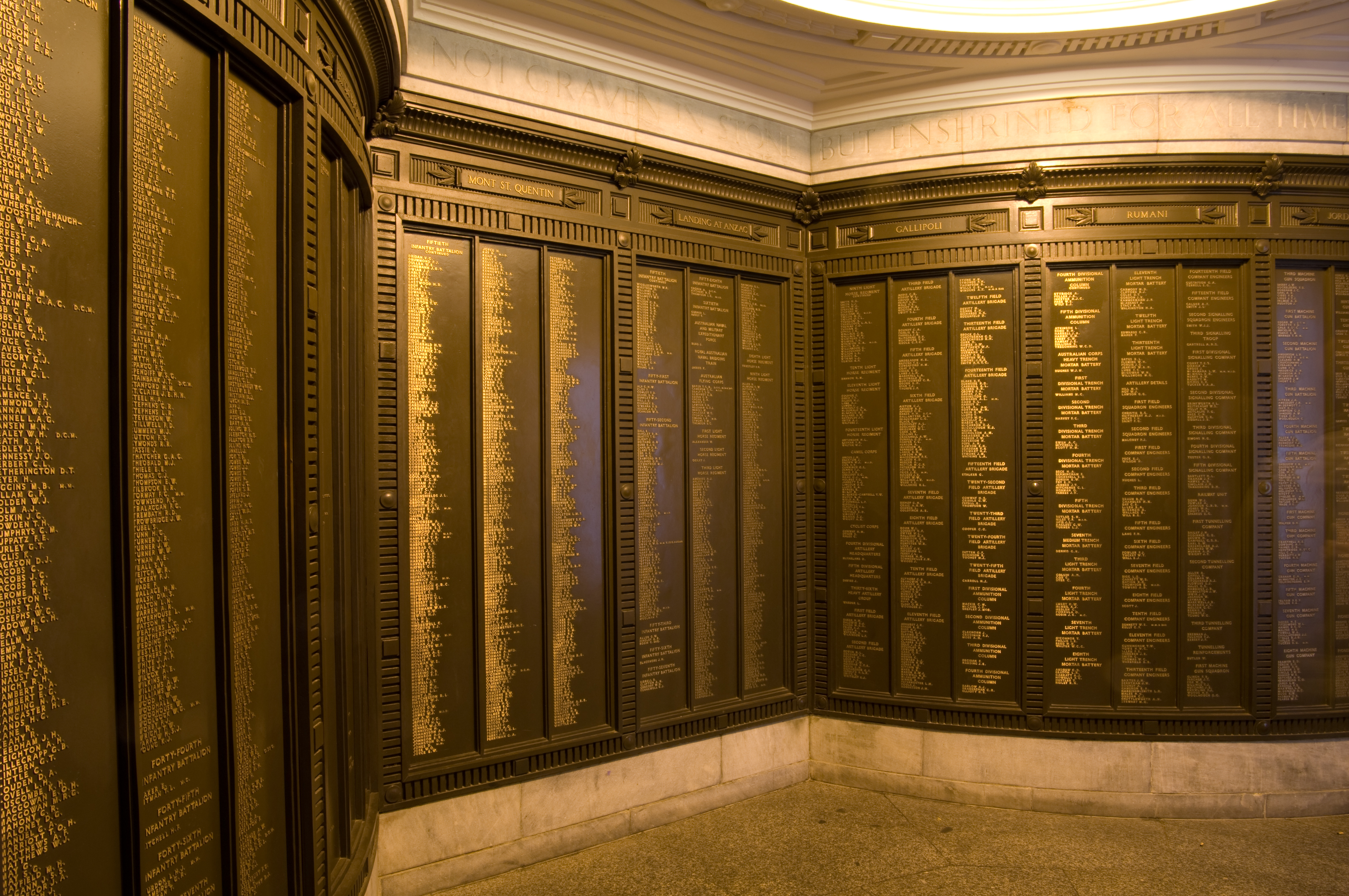
One of the bronzes inside the memorial's shrine that lists the names of the South Australians who died during the war.

Within the memorial the architects added an inner shrine, or Record Room, in which could be recorded the names of the South Australians who fell during the war. Although the design did not specify the exact form that this would take, in the completed memorial these names are inscribed in the bronzes that line the walls.

Bronze tablets were mounted on one wall of the inner shrine to honour the war dead, for which the Returned Soldiers' League contributed £3,500. Tablets on the opposite wall listed the South Australians who served in the war. Above the two entrances to the shrine were to be inscribed the names of the major theatres in which Australians served in the Great War. Originally it was suggested that this was to be Egypt, Gallipoli and Palestine on one side, with France on the other; in the final work Belgium was added to the list.

The design also allowed for a cenotaph within the inner shrine, which the designers suggested could either be used as a symbolic representation of the unknown soldier or as the marker to an actual grave. This element was never realised.

Although the central square mile of the City of Adelaide is designed to the points of the compass, the monument sits at a 45-degree angle to North Terrace. The architects provided two reasons for this. First, it was observed that "monuments suffer materially from monotonous lighting" when they face to the south; and second, the placing of the monument to face a north-west direction allows it to be in line with both the Cross of Sacrifice and St. Peter's Cathedral. In addition to these two arguments, Richardson also notes that the diagonal positioning of the memorial permits the dawn sun to fall on the facade.

== Nearby memorials ==
Although the National War Memorial was initially proposed as a memorial to those who served in the First World War, the site has since grown to incorporate a number of smaller memorials. These include a memorial to the Battle of Lone Pine; the French Memorial, which commemorates South Australians who fought and died in France during the first and second World Wars, unveiled in 1993; an honour roll of those who died in World War II; and the Australian Armed Forces Memorial, encompassing the Malayan Emergency of 1948–1960, the Korean War, the Indonesia–Malaysia confrontation in Borneo, and the Vietnam War. In addition, the wall which surrounds the northern and western sides of the site features the six "Crosses of Memory" – a series of "simple wooden crosses" commemorating the siege of Tobruk from 1941, the 10th, 27th, and 48th Battalions of 1916, and 50th Battalion of 1918. Along North Terrace, the Jubilee 150 Walkway honours recipients of the Victoria Cross and George Cross.

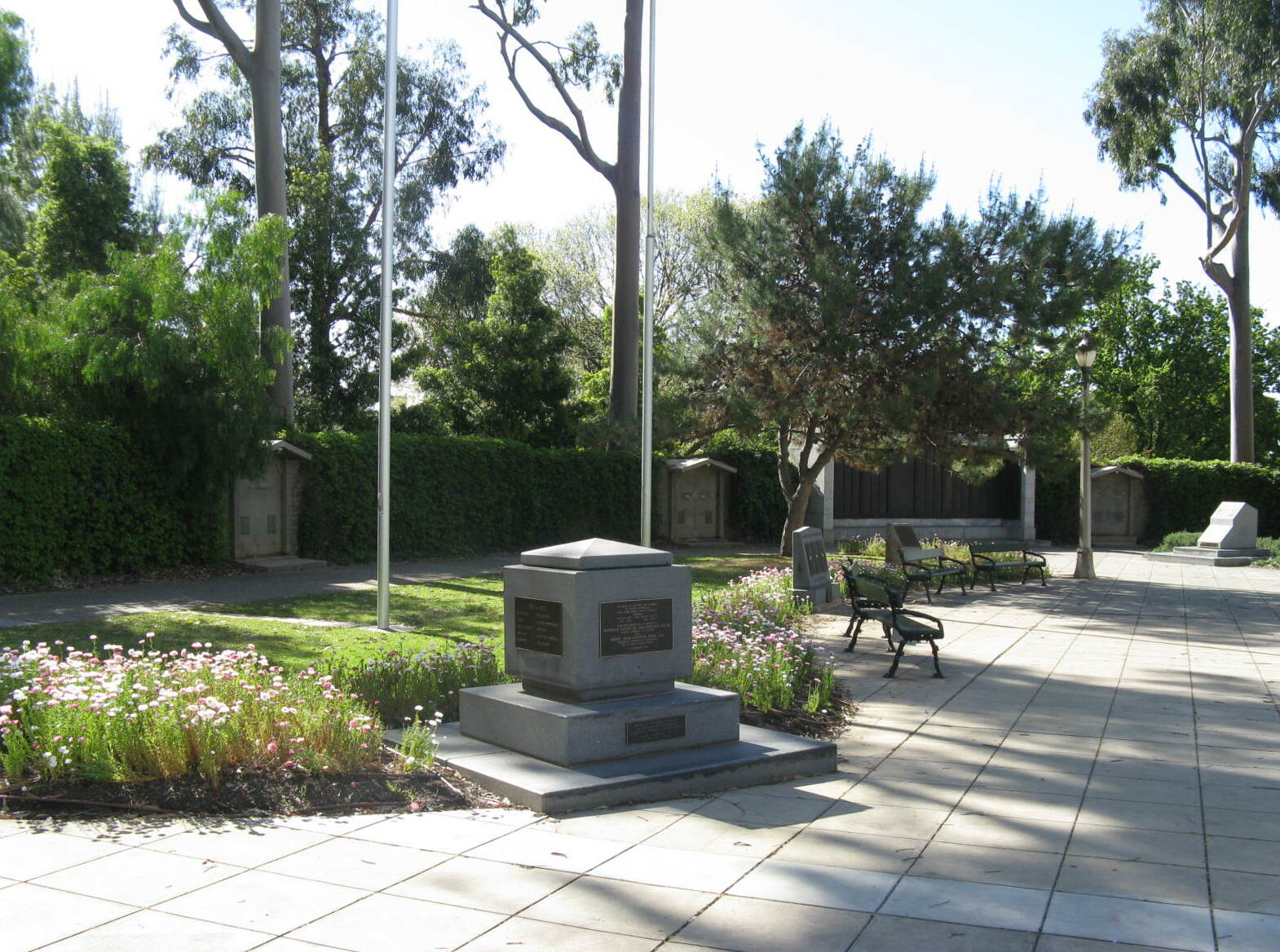
Part of the Jubilee 150 Walkway

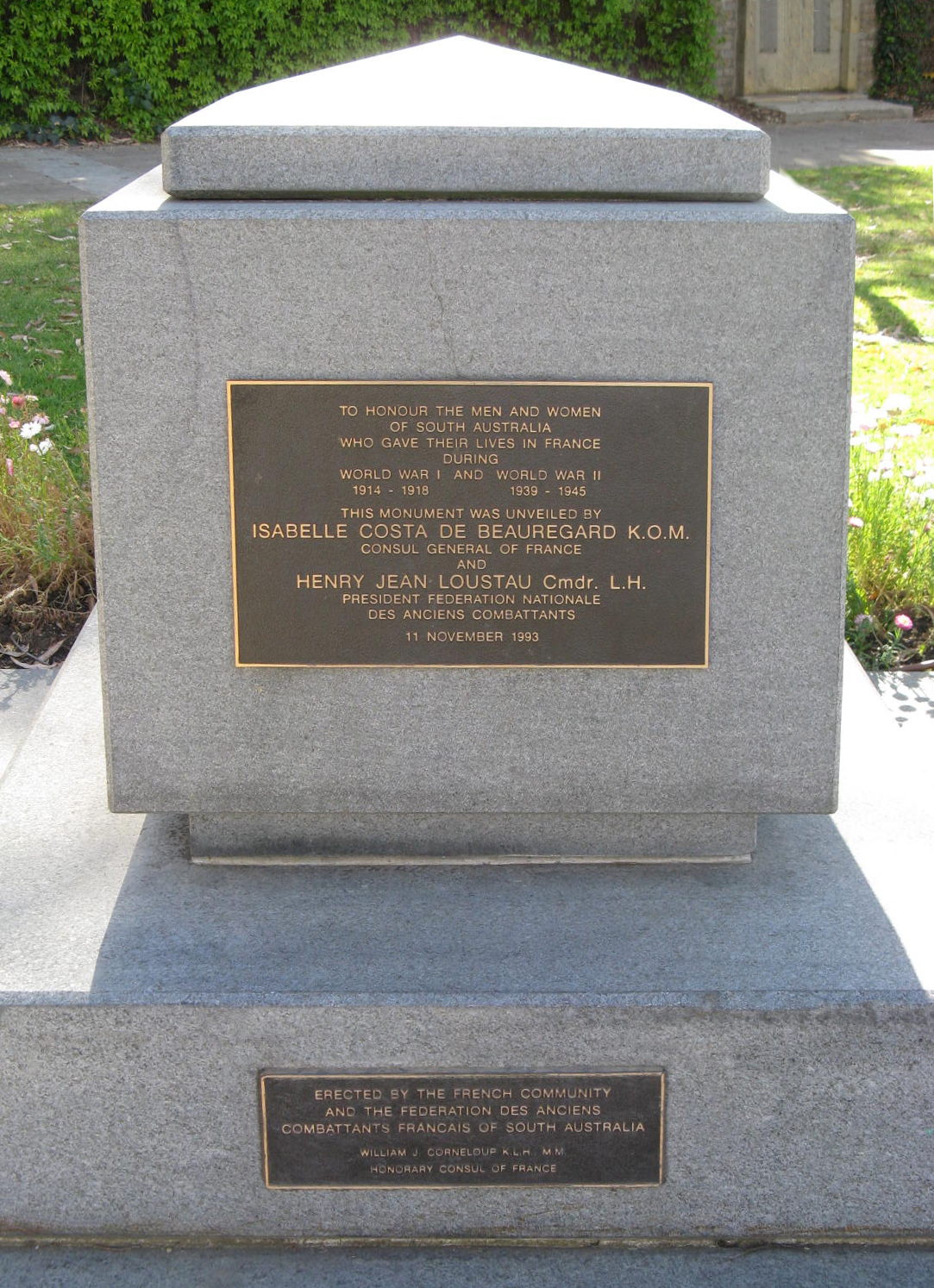
Memorial to South Australians who gave their lives during war in France

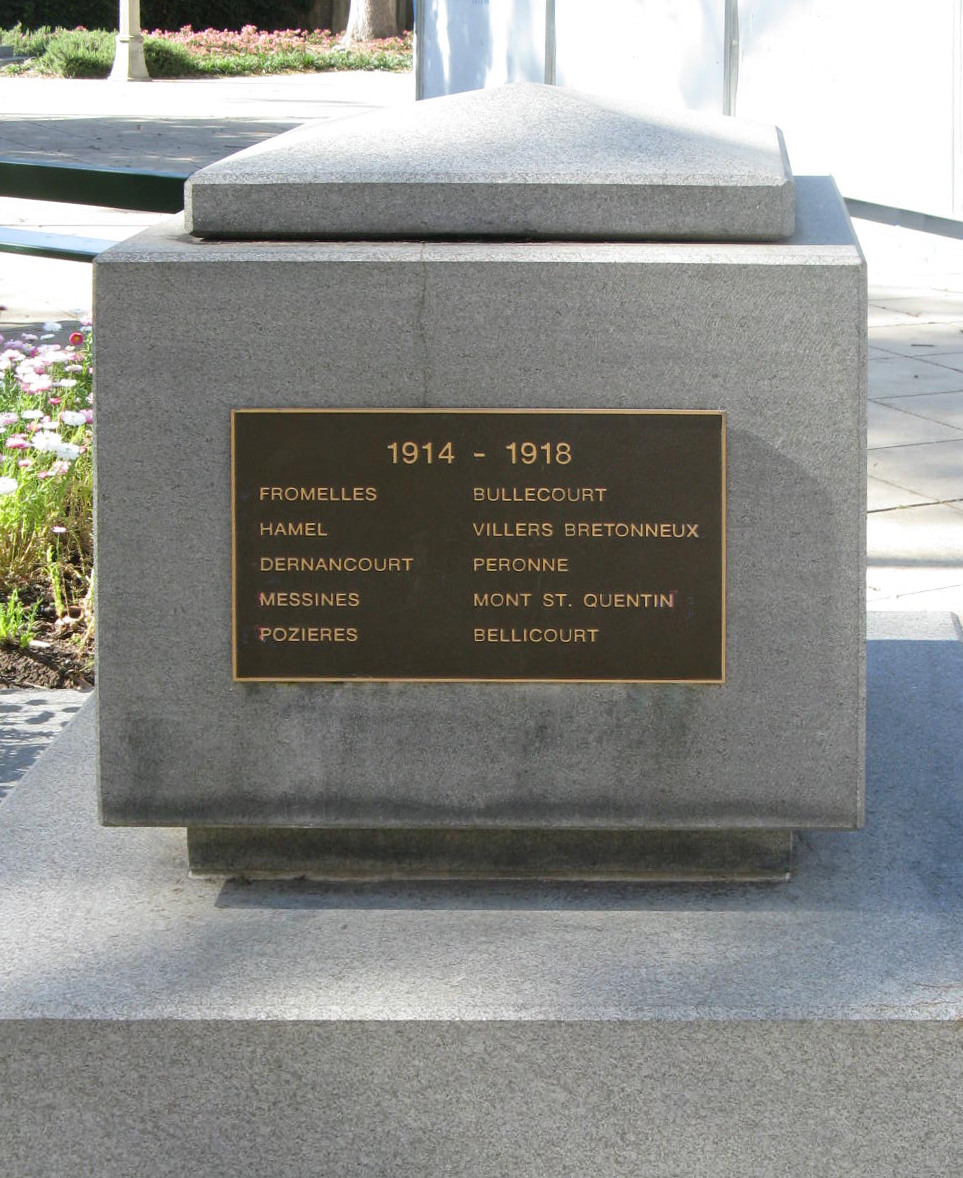
World War I battles in France

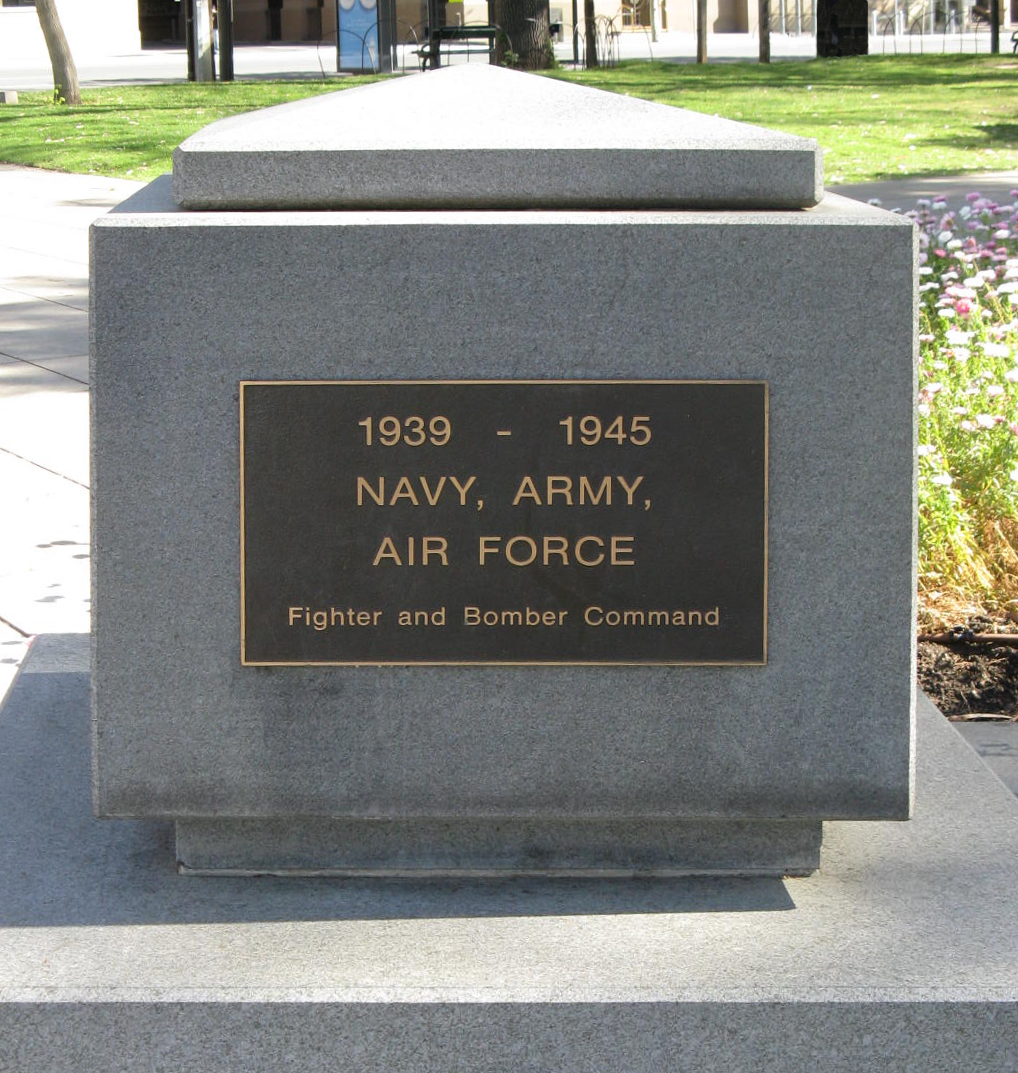
World War II Fighter and Bomber Command
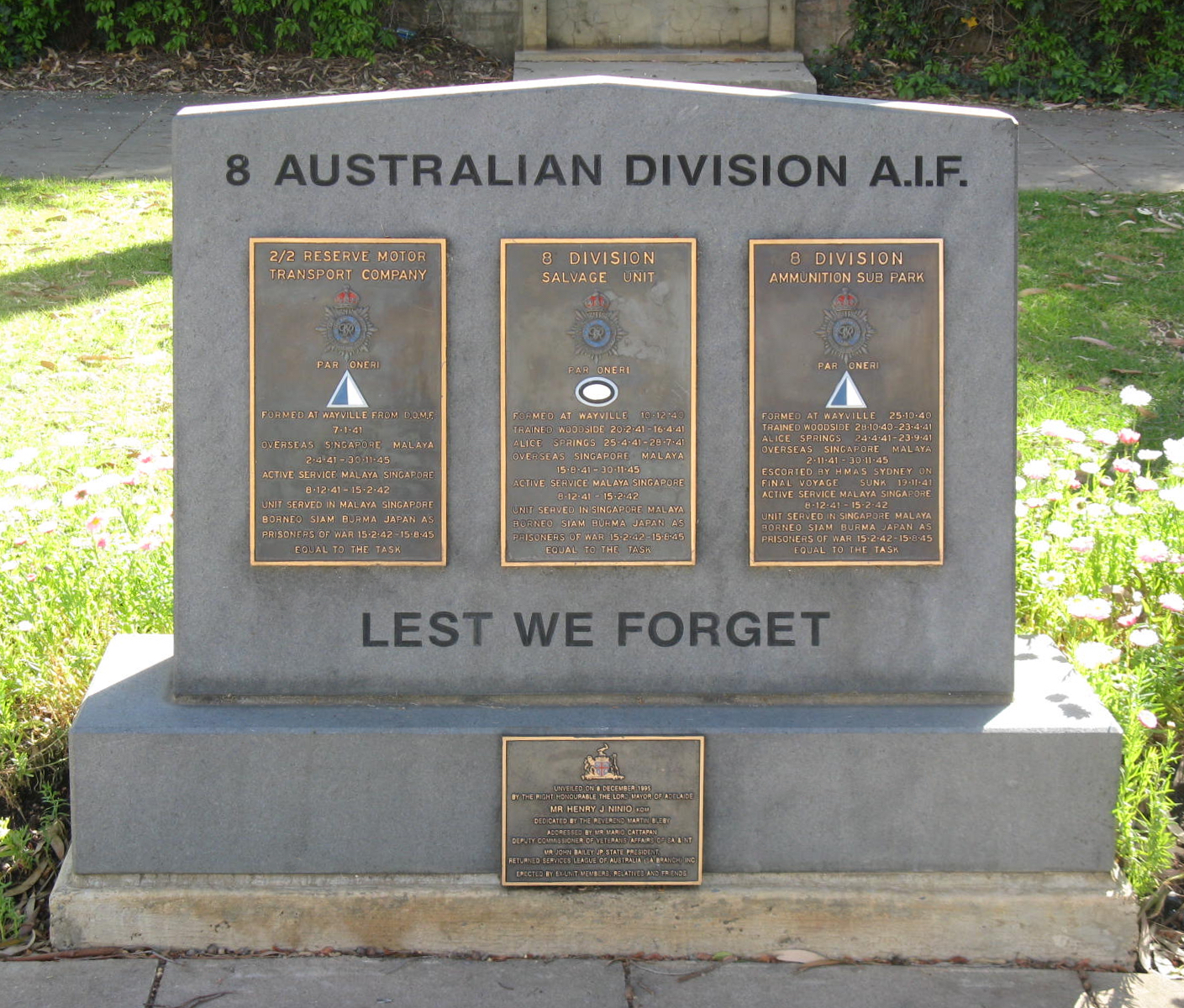
Memorial to the 8th Division of the Second Australian Imperial Force

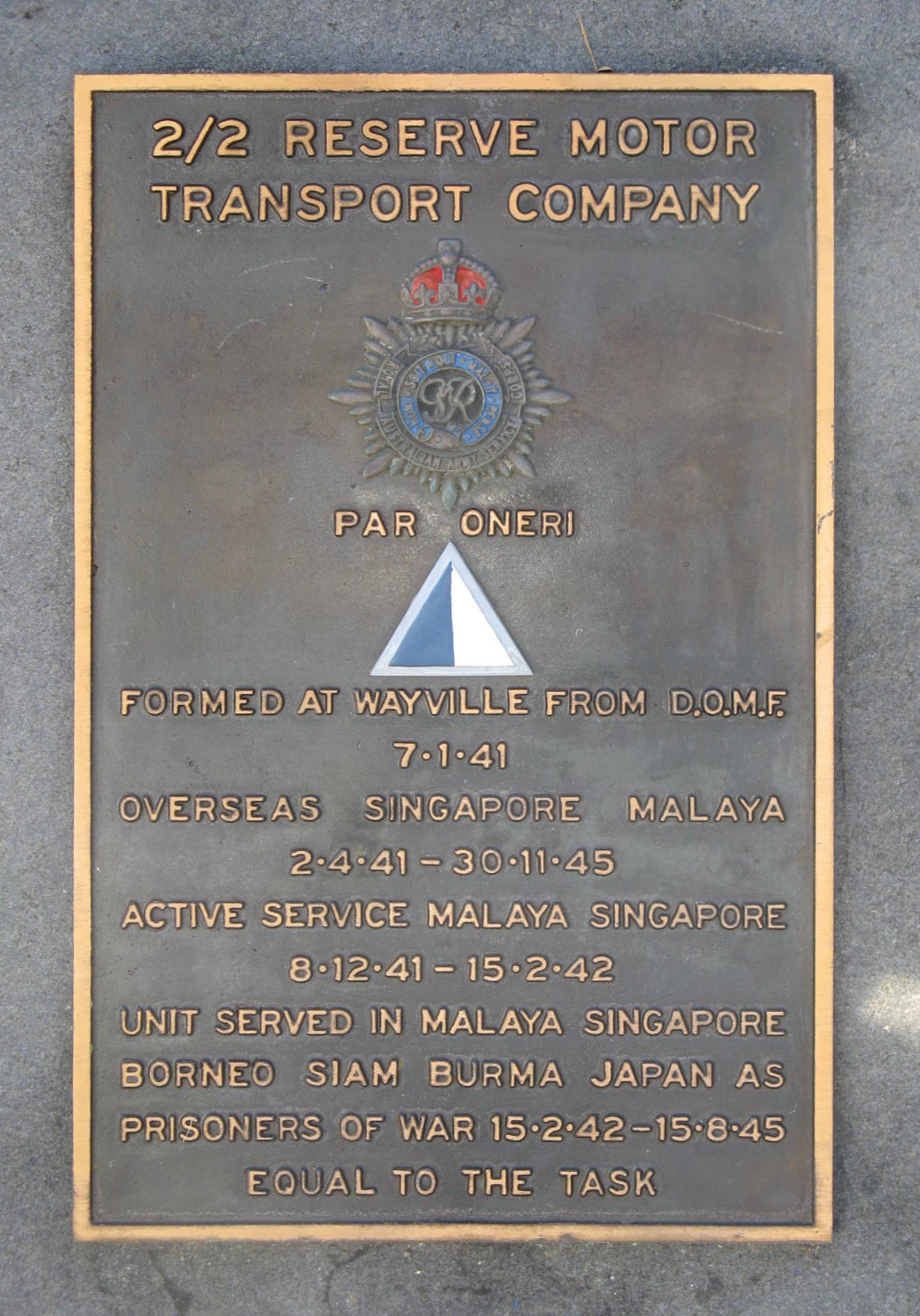
2/2 Reserve Motor Transport Company

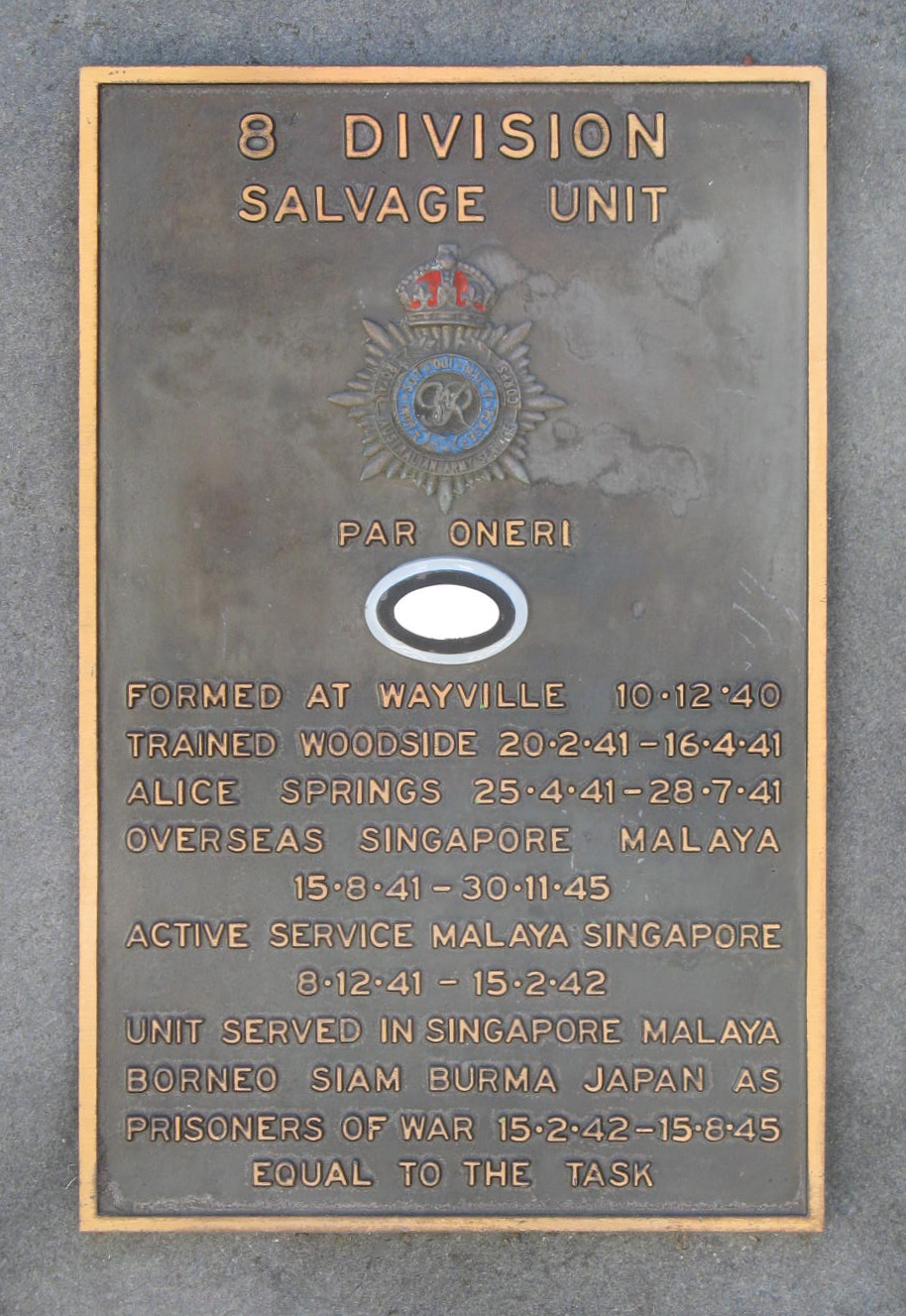
8 Div Salvage Unit

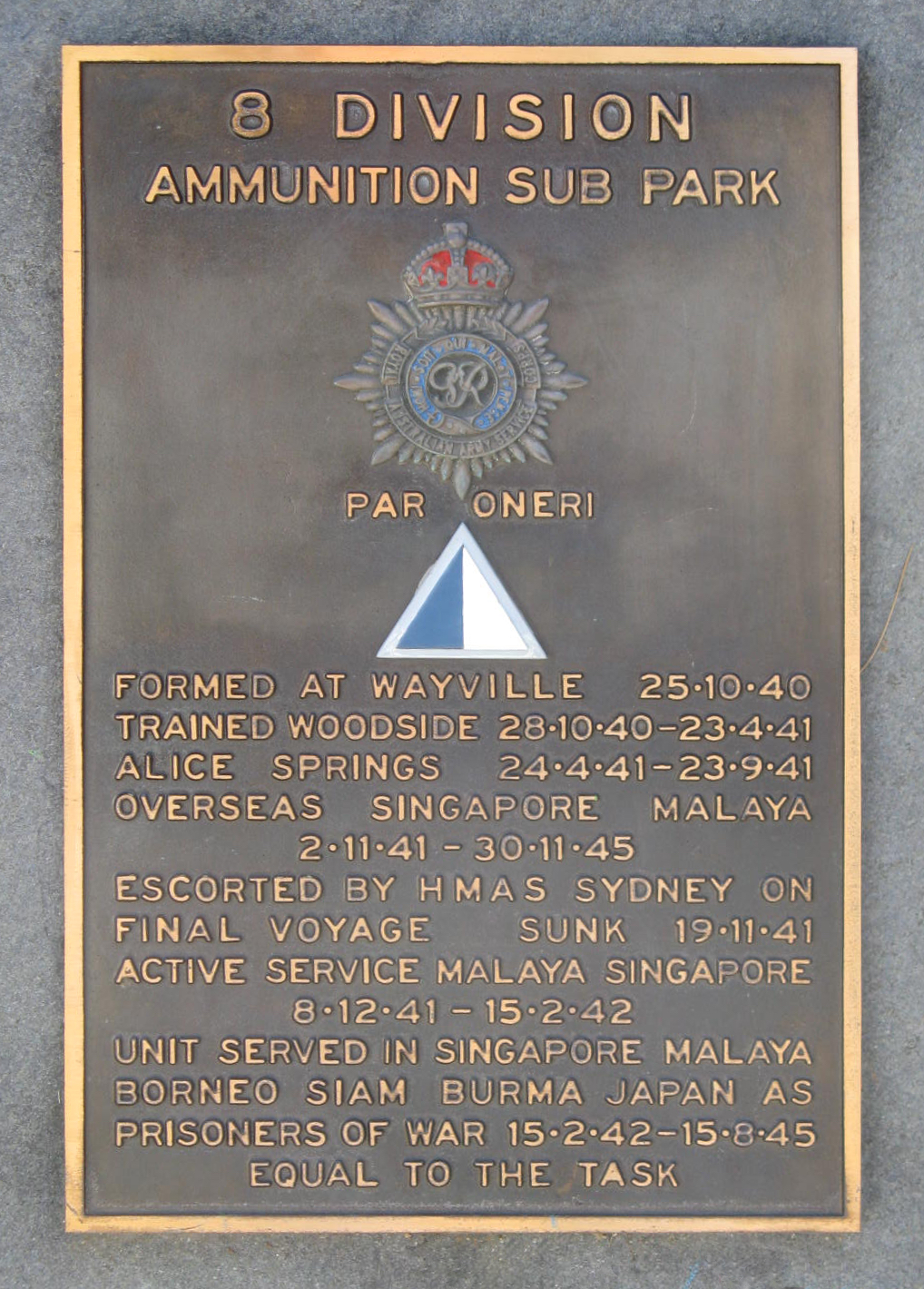
8 Div Ammunition Sub Park
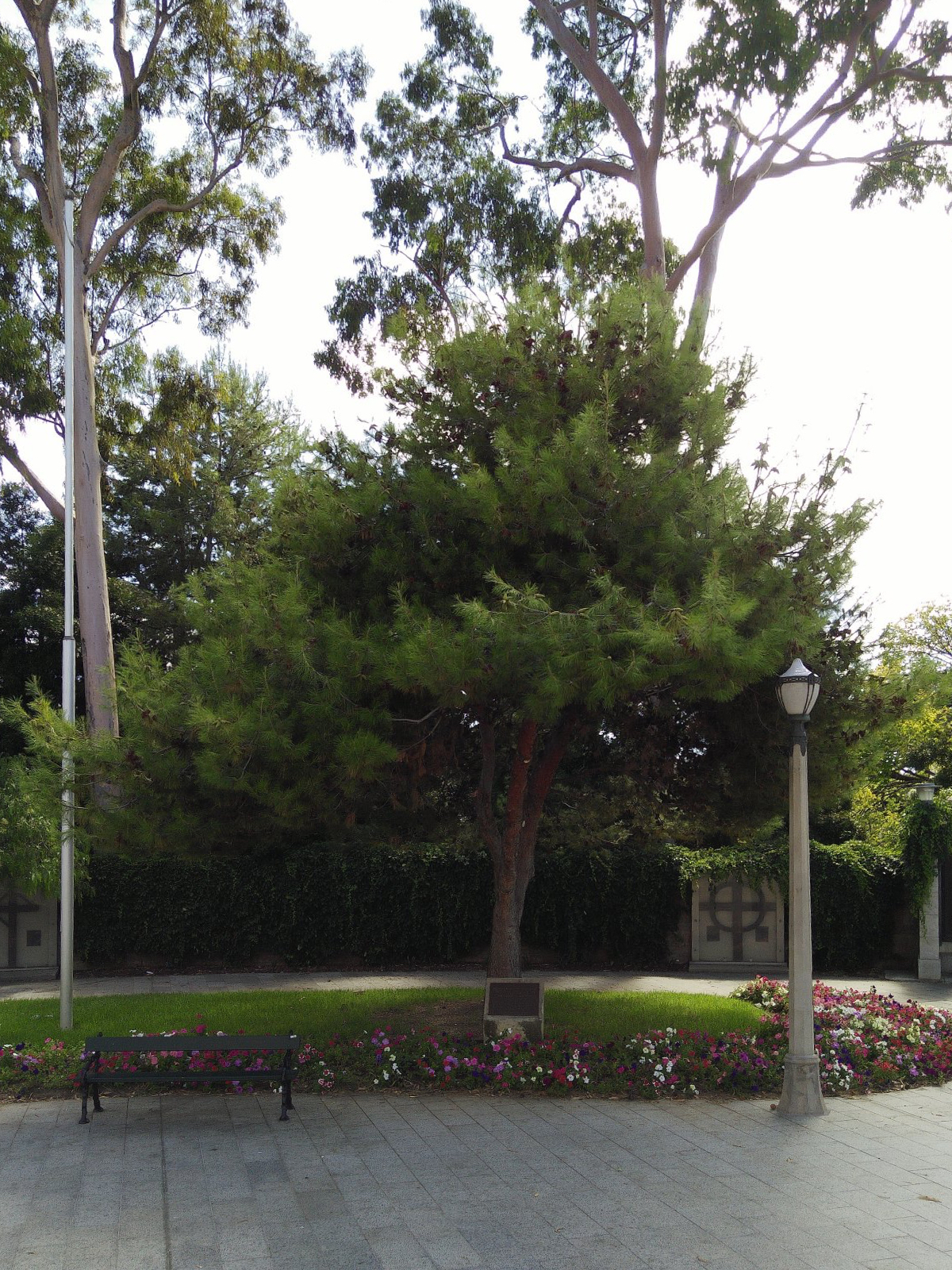
Battle of Lone Pine; the tree grew from a seedling related to the original Lone Pine

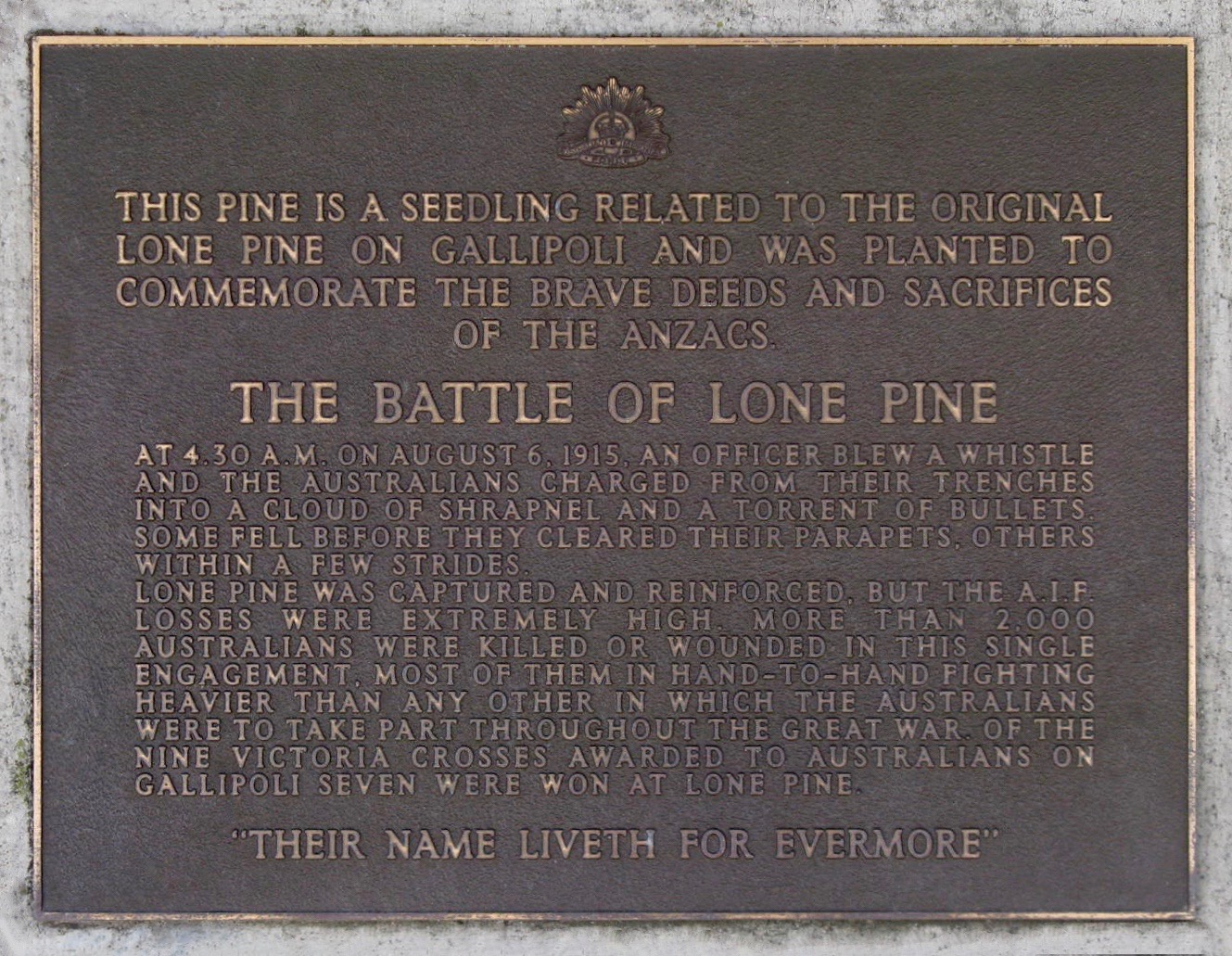
Battle of Lone Pine dedication plaque

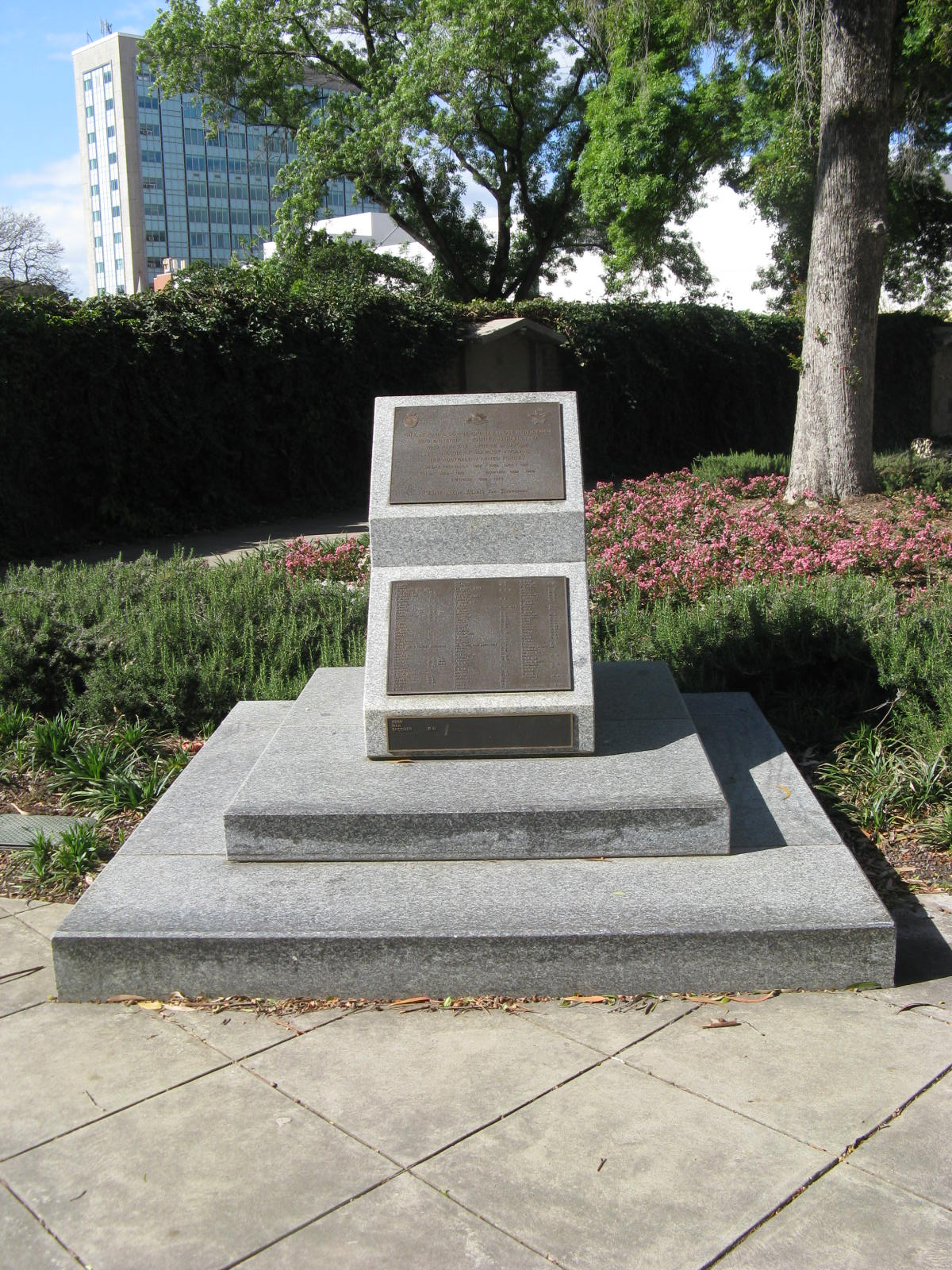
Australian Armed Forces Memorial: Korea, Malaya, Borneo and Vietnam

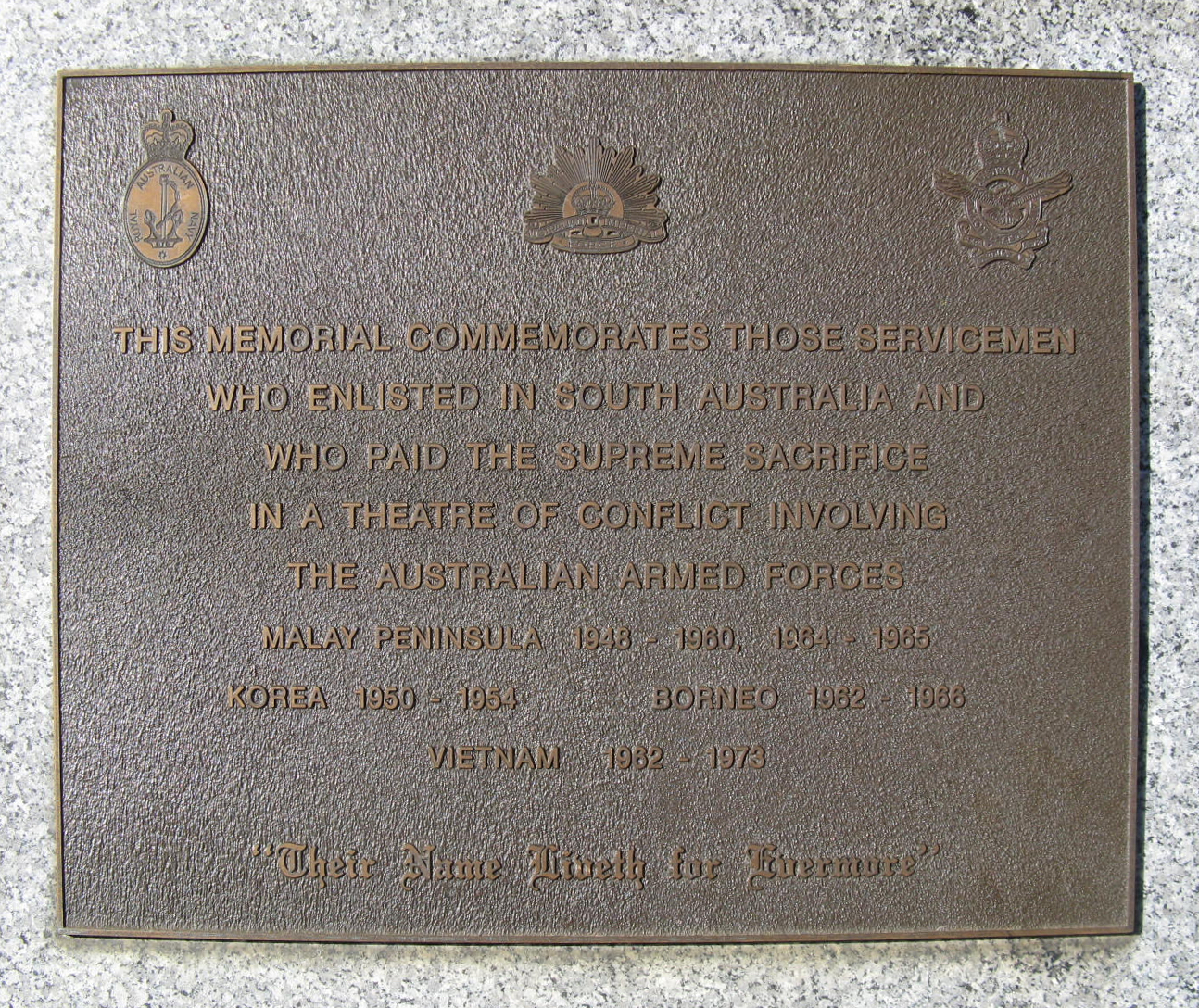
Korea, Malaya, Borneo and Vietnam – upper (dedication) plaque

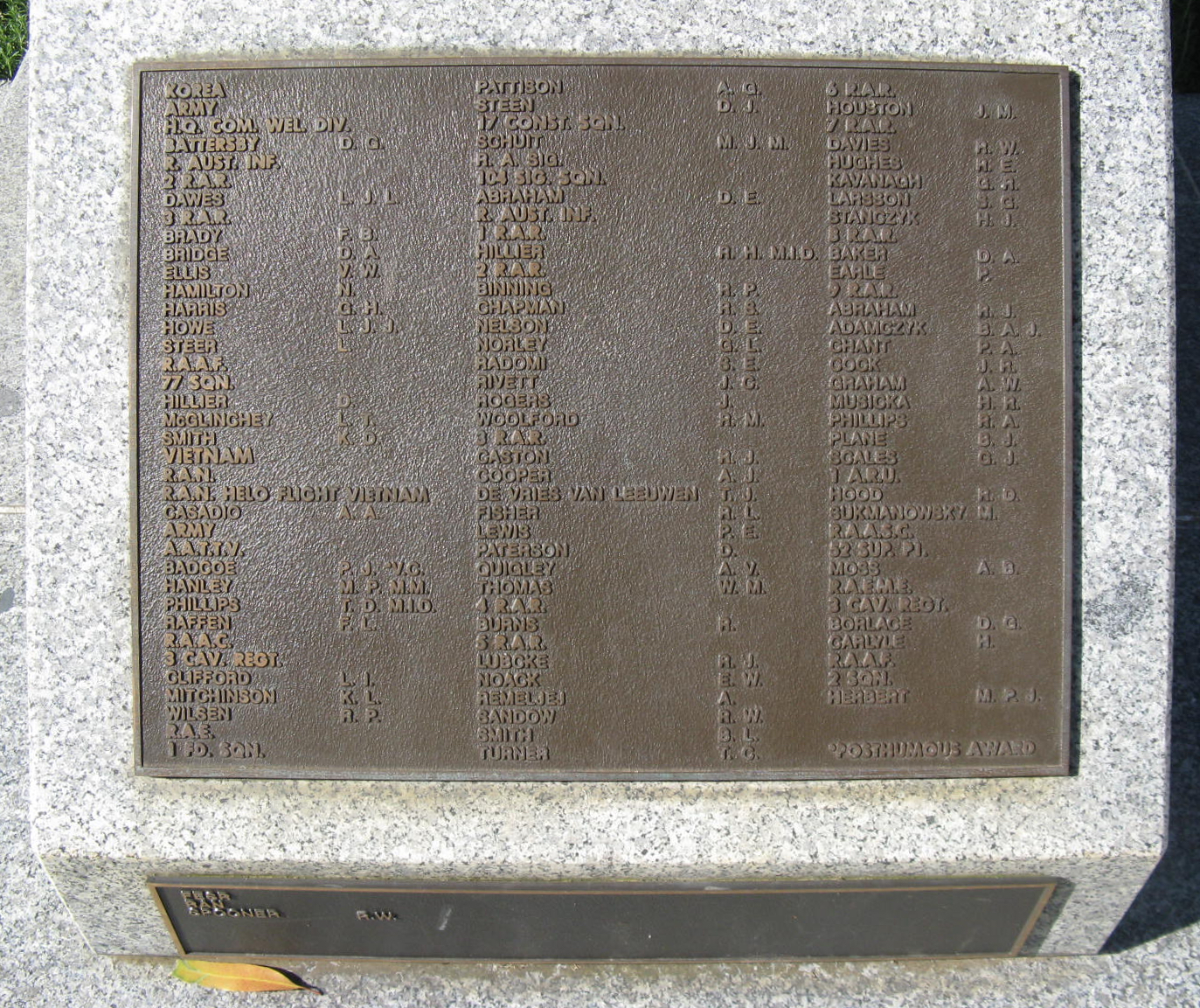
Honour roll: South Australians who died in Korea, Malaya, Borneo and Vietnam
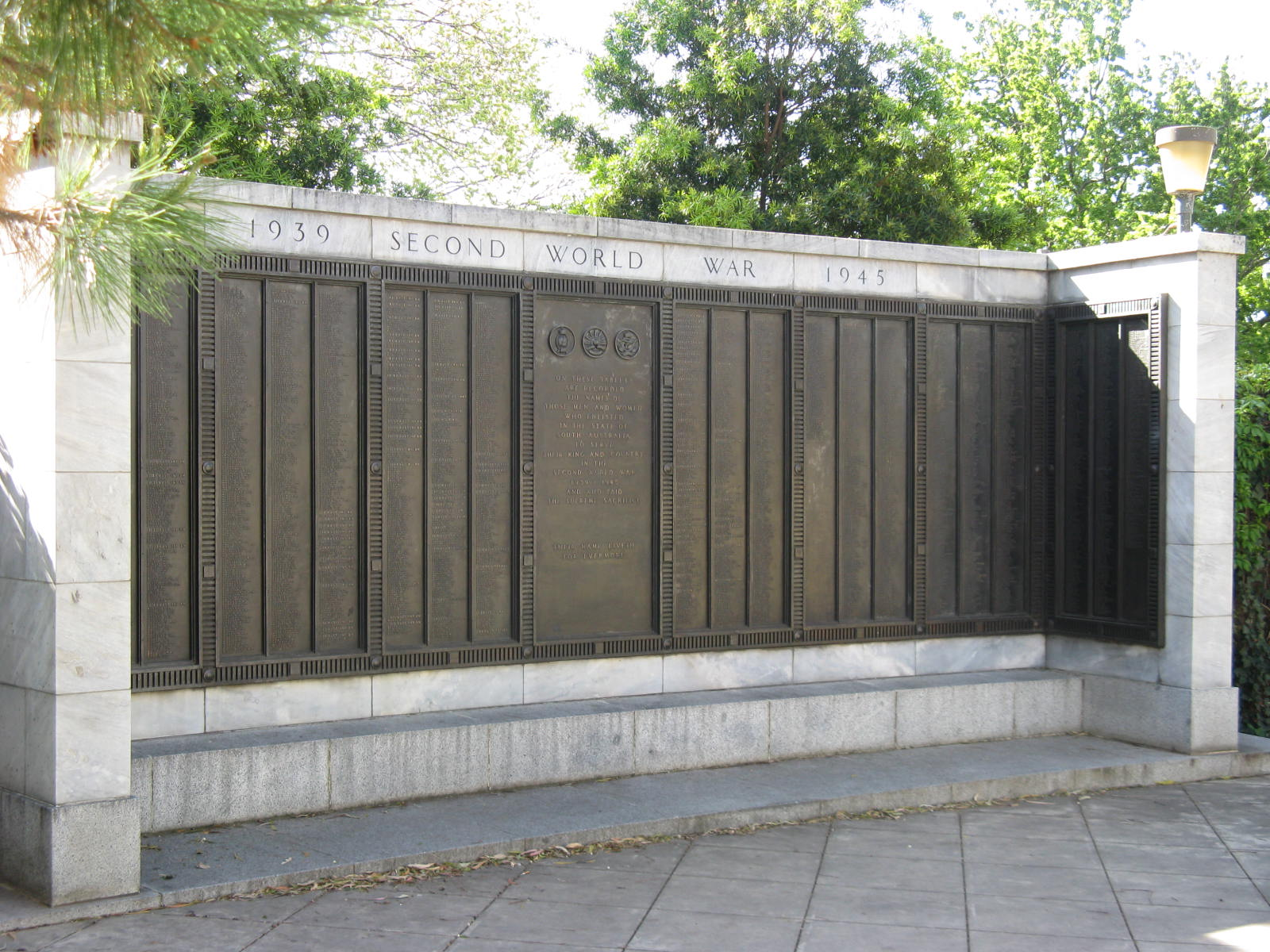
Honour roll: South Australians who died in World War II

Jubilee 150 Walkway plaques honouring recipients of the Victoria Cross and George Cross:

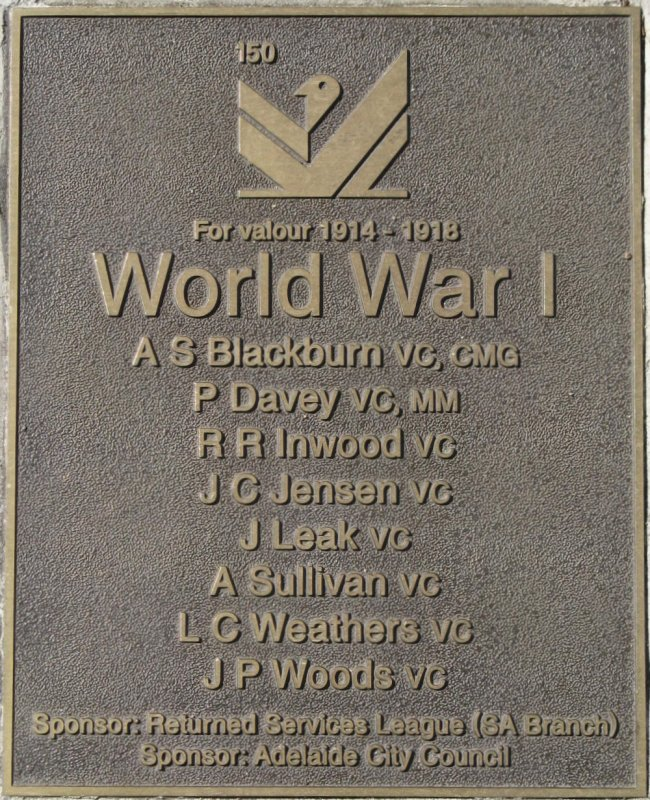
World War I VC recipients:
Blackburn, Davey, Inwood, Jensen, Leak, Sullivan, Weathers, Woods

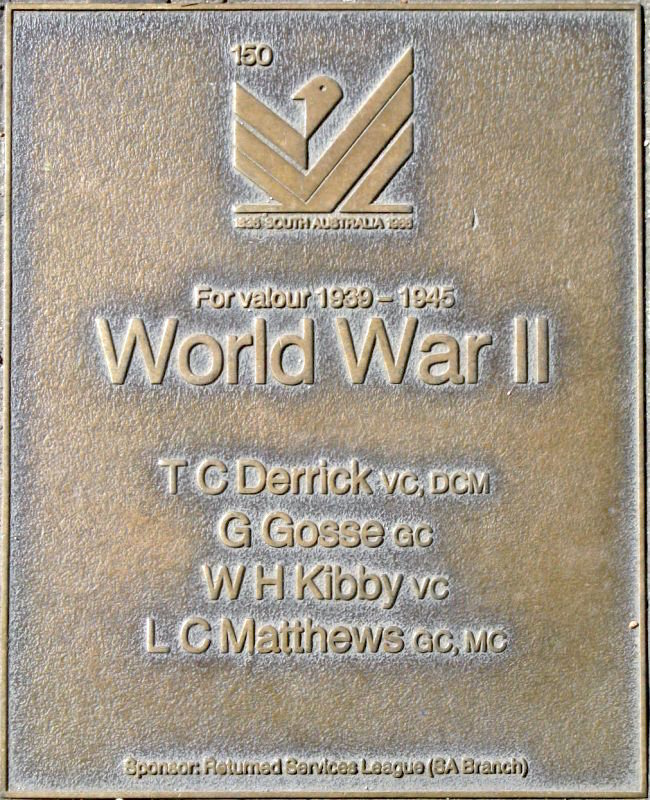
World War II VC & GC recipients:
Derrick, Gosse, Kibby, Matthews

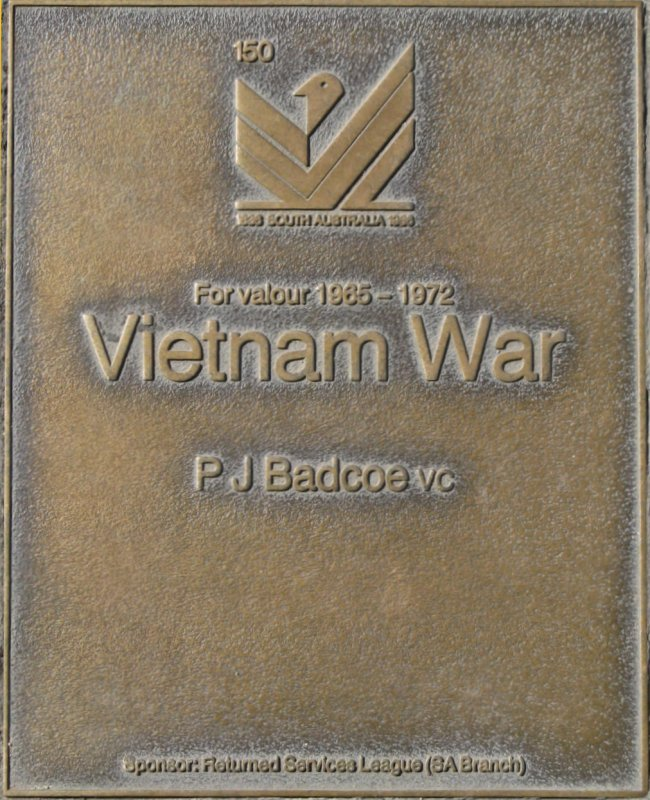
Vietnam War VC recipient:
Major Peter Badcoe

== Works consulted ==
- Cameron, Simon (1998). Silent Witness: Adelaide's statues and monuments. Adelaide, South Australia: Wakefield Press. ISBN 1-86254-402-6.
- "Carillon as Memorial". The Argus. 20 November 1923. p. 15.
- Clarke, Daniel (20 July 2002). "Designs for living and working". The Advertiser. p. 19.
- Conlon, Keith (2001). "Adelaide's National War Memorial". Postcards. Archived from the original on 19 July 2008.
- "Dawn Service on Anzac Day". The News. Vol. XXIV, no. 3, 651. South Australia. 3 April 1935. p. 3 – via National Library of Australia.
- Haran, Peter (11 November 2001). "Shrine facelift ready in time". The Advertiser. p. 8.
- Inglis, K. S.; Brazier, Jan (2008). Sacred Places: War Memorials in the Australian Landscape (3rd ed.). Victoria, Australia: Melbourne University Press. ISBN 978-0-522-85479-4.
- Jeffery, Judith (2001). "World War I". In Prest, Wilfrid (ed.). The Wakefield Companion to South Australian History. Adelaide, South Australia: Wakefield Press. ISBN 1-86254-559-6.
- Kelton, Greg (7 March 2007). "Fresh plan to shift governor". The Advertiser. Archived from the original on 27 March 2007. subscription: the source is only accessible via a paid subscription ("paywall").
- National War Memorial Committee (1 February 1924). National War Memorial: Conditions of Entry. Adelaide, South Australia: R. E. E. Rogers, Government Printer.
- Richardson, Donald (1998). "The National War Memorial, Adelaide: an historical study" (Document). D. Richardson.
- Richardson, Donald (25 April 1998). "Shaped for eternal honor". The Advertiser. p. 10.
- Scott, Ernest (1941). The Official History of Australia in the War of 1914–1918. Vol. XI (7th ed.). Queensland, Australia: University of Queensland Press.
- "The War Memorial: An Address by Mr. Laybourne-Smith". The Advertiser. 17 February 1928.
- Walkley, Gavin (1977). Louis Laybourne Smith: A Memoir. Adelaide, South Australia: South Australian Institute of Technology. ISBN 0-909471-63-0.
- "War Memorial Designs". The Argus. 12 June 1925. p. 15.
- "War Memorial for Adelaide". The Argus. 4 May 1923. p. 5.
- Woods, Bagot, Jory & Laybourne-Smith (1927). The National War Memorial for South Australia. Adelaide, South Australia: Hassell Press.
