= West Island Encounter Bay Aquatic Reserve =

Protected area in South Australia

- IUCN category VI (protected area with sustainable use of natural resources)
- Location within South Australia
- Location: South Australia
- Nearest city: Victor Harbor
- Coordinates: 35.6064°S 138.5891°E
- Area: 5.9 km^{2} (2.3 sq mi)
- Established: 1 December 1971
- Governing body: Primary Industries and Regions SA

West Island Encounter Bay Aquatic Reserve is a marine protected area in the Australian state of South Australia located in waters adjoining West Island immediately south of Fleurieu Peninsula and to the west of the town of Victor Harbor.

It was proclaimed on 30 November 1971 to protect sites used for abalone research in the waters within 100 metres (330 feet) of West Island. As of 2014, the aquatic reserve was larger in extent and had been divided into three zones. The original reserved area has been divided in two zones - known in 2014 as "Area 2" and "Area 3". Area 2, which is located on the north-west side of the island, is a prohibited area; both access and the taking of marine organisms is prohibited. Area 3, which is located on the south east side of the island, is a zone where the taking of marine organisms is prohibited. Area 1, which extends from the island to within 200 metres (660 feet) of the coastline of Fleurieu Peninsula, is zoned for fishing using line and where the taking of marine organisms other than fish is by permit.

While its name suggests a relationship with the bay known as Encounter Bay, the aquatic reserve is outside the bay to the south-west of its "seaward limit" as defined in proclamations made in the years 1987, 2006 and 2016 by the Australian government concerning the bay’s status as a "historic bay" under the Seas and Submerged Lands Act 1973.

Since 2012, it has been located within the boundaries of a “habitat protection zone” of the Encounter Marine Park with Area 2 being designated as a “restricted access zone” within the marine park’s zoning regime.

The aquatic reserve is classified as an IUCN Category VI protected area.

== See also ==
- West Island (disambiguation)
- Protected areas of South Australia
