= West Island Conservation Park =

Protected area in South Australia

- IUCN category Ia (strict nature reserve)
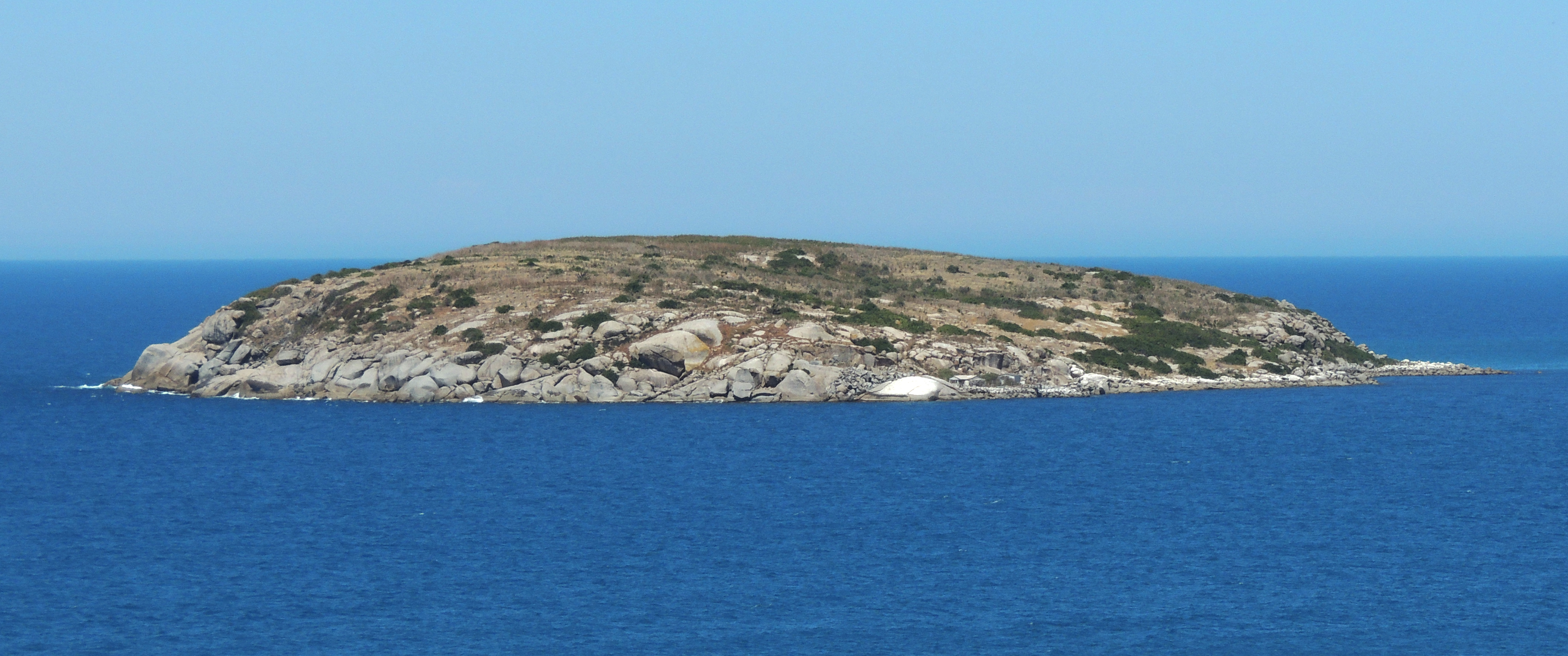
- West Island viewed from Rosetta Head

- Location within South Australia
- Location: South Australia
- Nearest city: Victor Harbor
- Coordinates: 35°36′20.68″S 138°35′43.55″E
- Area: 16 ha (40 acres)
- Established: 10 November 1966
- Governing body: Department for Environment and Water

West Island Conservation Park is a protected area occupying both West Island and Seal Island in coastal waters near Victor Harbor in South Australia. The park was proclaimed in 1972 following the enactment of the National Parks and Wildlife Act 1972 with the protection initially applying to West Island only which itself previously had reserve status under the Fauna Conservation Act 1964-1965. Seal Island was added to the park in 1979. The purpose of the park is to protect the breeding populations of bird species present on both islands such as little penguins, silver gulls, crested terns, Caspian terns and fairy terns. The conservation park is classified as an IUCN Category Ia protected area. In 1982, it was listed on the now-defunct Register of the National Estate.
