= West Island (South Australia) =

Island in South Australia

West
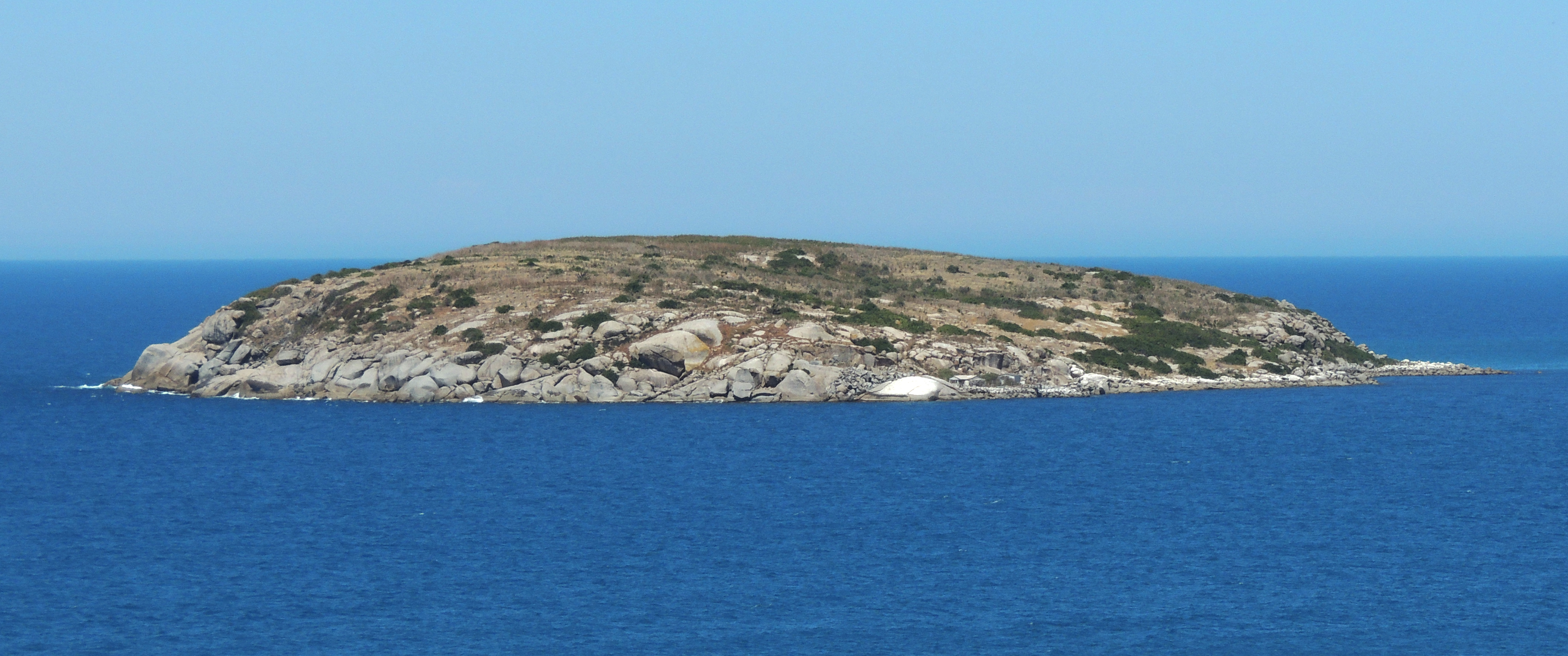
- West Island viewed from The Bluff

- Location within South Australia

Geography
- Location: Great Australian Bight
- Coordinates: 35°36′30″S 138°35′30″E
- Highest elevation: 40 m (130 ft)

Administration
- Australia

West Island is a 10 hectares (25 acres) granite island lying 0.8 kilometres (0.50 miles) off the southern coast of the Fleurieu Peninsula, South Australia, 7 kilometres (4.3 miles) south-west of the town of Victor Harbor. It rises to a maximum height of about 40 metres (130 feet) in the south-west. Its main conservation value lies in its seabird colonies.

== History ==
West Island was named for its location 2 kilometres (1.2 miles) west of the promontory of Rosetta Head. During the 1880s it was quarried for granite to construct the foundations of Parliament House, Adelaide. From 1913 until the mid-1960s it was zoned as a Reserve for Government Purposes and, for a short period, was used by the Adelaide University Regiment as a target for gunnery practice during field exercises. In 1966 it became a fauna reserve. Until about 1970 fishers took little penguins and rabbits to use as crayfish bait, though the population of rabbits on the island was exterminated by 1971 and it was declared a Conservation Park in 1972. In 1973 and 1975 Pearson Island rock-wallabies were introduced to the island.

== Fauna ==
Breeding seabirds include little penguins, silver gulls, and crested, Caspian and fairy terns. Reptiles recorded from the island include Cunningham's spiny-tailed, White's and Peron's earless skinks. In 1977, it was reported that Australian sea lions occasionally visited the island. The island is an important breeding site for Caspian terns, with 50 of the birds counted there during a 2020 survey.

=== Little penguin decline ===
In 1926, visitor Geoffrey Salter said of West Island that "there was a penguin's nest under every other rock." Penguins were also observed on West Island in 1928 and 1950.

The West Island little penguin population has suffered a dramatic decline since the 1990s. A general count occurring in early December 1991 found 700 penguins present. In 1992, the population was estimated to be around 4000 penguins. In June 2011, the population was estimated to be less than 20 penguins. The decline echoes the decline of the colony on nearby Granite Island. In January 2013, Victor Harbor mayor Graham Philp said that the penguin colonies on West Island and Wright Island were 'extinct' while the population on Granite Island was in 'the low 20s'.

A census conducted by penguin ecologist Dr. Diane Colombelli-Négrel from Flinders University in 2013 found no penguins and no active burrows on West Island. The census' report concluded that the colony had not recovered from a prior colony collapse.

In 2020, nesting little penguins were discovered on West Island, indicating recolonisation had occurred since 2013.

== Protected area status ==
West Island has enjoyed protected area status since 10 November 1966 when it was declared a Fauna Reserve under the Fauna Conservation Act 1964-1965. It was re-declared a Fauna Conservation Reserve under the Crown Lands Act on 26 March 1970 and was again re-declared as a Conservation Park in 1972 following the enactment of the National Parks and Wildlife Act 1972. The waters within 100 metres (330 feet) of West Island were declared as an Aquatic Reserve under the Fisheries Act 1971-1976 in 1971 in order to protect sites used for abalone research. Since 2012, the waters surrounding its shores are located within the boundaries of the Encounter Marine Park.

== See also ==
- West Island (disambiguation)
- List of islands of Australia
