= Lists of people by epithet =

An epithet (from Ancient Greek ἐπίθετον (epítheton) 'adjective', from ἐπίθετος (epíthetos) 'additional') is a byname, or a descriptive term (word or phrase), accompanying or occurring in place of a name and having entered common usage. Certain epithets have been used for numerous people throughout history.

== List ==
- Accursed
- Angel
- Bad
- Bald
- Bastard
- Bearded
- Beautiful
- Black
- Blind
- Bold
- Brave
- Chaste
- Conqueror
- Courageous
- Cruel
- Drunkard
- Fair
- Fat
- Fearless
- Fortunate
- Generous
- Gentle
- Good
- Great
- Grim
- Hairy
- Handsome
- Hermit
- Holy
- Hunchback
- Just
- Lame
- Learned
- Lion
- Little
- Lucky
- Mad
- Magnanimous
- Magnificent
- Merciful
- Mighty
- Mild
- Monk
- Navigator
- Old
- One-Eyed
- Peaceful
- Pious
- Posthumous
- Proud
- Prudent
- Rash
- Recluse
- Red
- Resolute
- Rich
- Short
- Silent
- Simple
- Small
- Stammerer
- Steadfast
- Stout
- Strict
- Strong
- Tall
- Terrible
- Unfortunate
- Valiant
- Venerable
- Warlike
- White
- Wild
- Wise
- Young

== See also ==
- List of monarchs by nickname
