= Fearless =

Fearless or The Fearless may refer to:

== Psychology ==
- Lack of fear
- Courage or bravery

== Film, television and audio ==
=== Film ===
- Fearless (1978 film), an Italian film directed by Stelvio Massi
- Fearless (1993 film), an American drama directed by Peter Weir
- Fearless, a 1999 New Zealand television film produced by South Pacific Pictures
- Fearless (2006 film), a Chinese-Hong Kong martial arts film directed by Ronny Yu and starring Jet Li as Huo Yuanjia
- Fearless (2020 film), an animated comedy film

=== Television and audio ===
- DGUSA Fearless, a series of professional wrestling pay-per-view events
- Fearless, a DVD by David Blaine
- The Fearless, a 2007 season of the audio drama series Dalek Empire
- Fearless (2016 TV series), a Portuguese-language sports documentary series
- Fearless (British TV series), a 2017 British crime thriller
- Fearless (TV pilot), a 2003 pilot based on the Francine Pascal novel series (see below)
- Fearless: The Inside Story of the AFLW, a 2022 Australian documentary series about the AFL Women's League
- Fearless: The Margaret Moth Story, a short documentary film by CNN about photojournalist Margaret Moth
- Bobby "Fearless" Smith, a fictional character in the series Boomtown

==== Episodes ====
- "Fearless" (Beverly Hills, 90210)
- "Fearless" (Boomtown)
- "Fearless" (Fallen Angels)
- "Fearless" (Rescue: Special Ops)
- "Fearless" (Tutenstein)
- "Fearless" (The Wizard of Oz)

== Literature ==
- Fearless (Angel novel), a 2003 novel based on the American TV series Angel
- Fearless (Lott novel), a 2007 novel by Tim Lott
- Fearless, A Novel of Sarah Bowman, a 1998 novel by Lucia St. Clair Robson
- Fearless, a novel by T. E. Berry-Hart
- Fearless, a novel by Cornelia Funke
- Fearless, a novel by Rafael Yglesias
- Fearless (novel series), juvenile novels by Francine Pascal
- Fearless (comics), a limited series by Mark Sable and P.J. Holden from Image Comics
- Fearless, a comics adaptation of the 1974 film The Land That Time Forgot

== Music ==
=== Albums ===
- Fearless (Acrania album), 2015
- Fearless (Cowboy Mouth album), 2008
- Fearless (Crystal Lewis album), or the title song, 2000
- Fearless (Eighth Wonder album), 1988
- Fearless (Family album), 1971
- Fearless (Fleur East album), 2020
- Fearless (Francis Dunnery album), 1994
- Fearless (Group 1 Crew album), 2012
- Fearless (Jazmine Sullivan album), 2008
- Fearless (Keri Noble album), 2004
- Fearless (Marvaless album), 1998
- Fearless (Nina Hagen album), 1984
- Fearless (Phillips, Craig and Dean album), 2009
- Fearless (S7N album), 2013
- Fearless (Taylor Swift album) or the title song (see below), 2008
  - Fearless (Taylor's Version), a re-recording of the 2008 album, 2021
- Fearless (Terri Clark album), 2000
- Fearless (Tim Curry album), 1979
- Fearless (Travis Ryan album), 2012
- Fearless (Virtue album), 2016
- Fearless, by Collin Raye, 2006
- Fearless, by Marina Kaye, 2015
- Fearless, by Vaughn, 2001

=== EPs ===
- Fearless (G.E.M. EP), 2018
- Fearless (Jay Chou EP), 2006
- Fearless (Le Sserafim EP), 2022

=== Songs ===
- "Fearless" (The Bravery song), 2005
- "Fearless" (Le Sserafim song), 2022
- "Fearless" (Pink Floyd song), 1971
- "Fearless" (President song), 2025
- "Fearless" (Taylor Swift song), 2010
- "Fearless" (Wes Carr song), 2009
- "Fearless", by Amaranthe from Manifest
- "Fearless", by Colbie Caillat from Breakthrough
- "Fearless", by DC Talk from Supernatural
- "Fearless", by Goo Goo Dolls from Miracle Pill
- "Fearless", by Gothminister from We Are All Demons
- "Fearless", by Gromee ft. May-Britt Scheffer
- "Fearless", by Hypocrisy from Virus
- "Fearless", by Isabela Merced from Spirit Untamed
- "Fearless", by Louis Tomlinson from Walls
- "Fearless", by Lucas & Steve, 2015
- "Fearless", by Michelle Williams
- "Fearless", by Ozzy Osbourne from Scream
- "Fearless", by Primal Fear from Code Red
- "Fearless", by Seven Spires from Emerald Seas
- "Fearless", by VNV Nation from Futureperfect

=== Other ===
- Fearless Tour, a 2008 concert tour by Taylor Swift
- Fearless Records, an American record label
- Fearless Management, an American management company specializing in music

== People ==
- Fearless (gamer), stage name of professional esports player Lee Eui-seok

== Ships ==
- HMS Fearless, various ships of the British Royal Navy
- USS Fearless, various ships the United States Navy
- Fearless-class landing platform dock, a class of British Royal Navy amphibious warfare ships
- Fearless-class patrol vessel, Republic of Singapore Navy
- Fearless (tugboat), Canadian-built 1945 vessel currently in Port Adelaide, Australia

== See also ==
- List of people known as the Fearless
- Fearless Girl, a bronze sculpture in New York City
