= English rose (epithet) =

Nickname for an attractive English woman

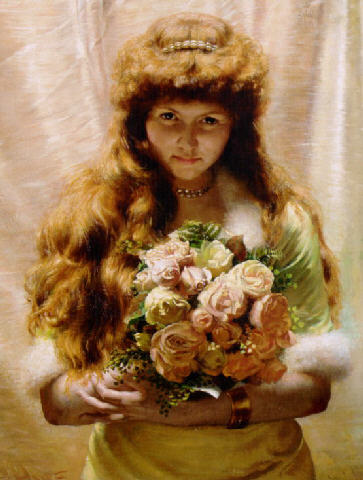
An English Rose (Saint George Hare)

English rose is a description, associated with English culture, that may be applied to a naturally beautiful woman or girl who is from or is associated with England. The description has a cultural reference to the national flower of England, the rose, and to its long tradition within English symbolism.

== Use in arts ==
The term "English rose" is found in Merrie England (1902), a comic opera written by Basil Hood. He describes a garden where "women are the flowers" and in which "the sweetest blossom" or "fairest queen" is "the perfect English rose". The words are performed by a tenor in the role of Sir Walter Raleigh (1554–1618), in the presence of a May Queen, but regarding his secret love (purely within the opera), a member of the household of Elizabeth I.

A song by the rock band the Jam taken from their album All Mod Cons (1978) is titled "English Rose".

At the funeral of Diana, Princess of Wales in 1997, Elton John performed a new version of his 1974 hit, "Candle in the Wind", which began with the adapted lyrics, "Goodbye England's rose...".

"Last of the English Roses" is a 2008 song by singer/songwriter Pete Doherty from his album Grace/Wastelands. In Ed Sheeran's 2014 album x, English Rose is one of the songs included in Wembley edition bonus tracks. English Rose is the name of the 2019 debut album by singer/songwriter Connie Constance; its first song (a cover of a song by the Jam) is also titled "English Rose".

== Notable "English roses" ==
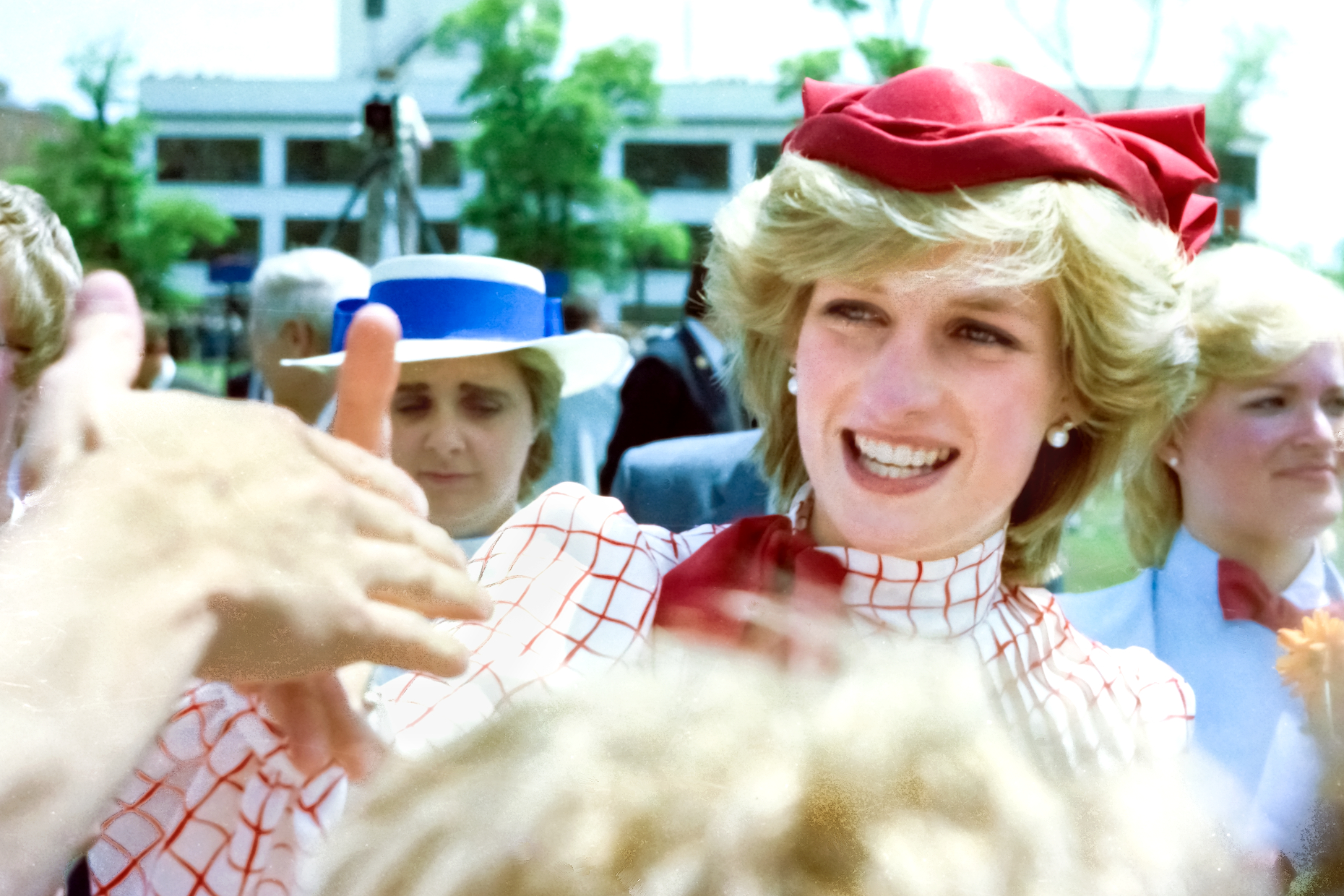
Diana, Princess of Wales was described as "England's rose" in the Elton John and Bernie Taupin song "Candle in the Wind 1997"

- Adele (born 1988), singer-songwriter
- Julie Andrews (born 1935), actress, singer and author
- Kate Beckinsale (born 1973), actress
- Jane Birkin (1946–2023), actress and singer
- Emily Blunt (born 1983), actress
- Helena Bonham Carter (born 1966), actress; label applies to her early roles
- Kate Bush (born 1958), singer-songwriter
- Catherine, Princess of Wales (born 1982)
- Emilia Clarke (born 1986), actress
- Jean Dawnay (1915–2016), model and media personality
- Diana, Princess of Wales (1961–1997)
- Marianne Faithfull (1946–2025), singer
- Anna Friel (born 1976), actress
- Ellie Goulding (born 1986), singer-songwriter
- Susan Hampshire (born 1937), actress
- Rosie Huntington-Whiteley (born 1987), model
- Lily James (born 1989), actress
- Keira Knightley (born 1985), actress
- Vivien Leigh (1913–1967), actress
- Hayley Mills (born 1946), actress
- Rosemary Nicols (born 1941), actress
- Rosamund Pike (born 1979), actress
- Imogen Poots (born 1989), actress
- Florence Pugh (born 1996), actress
- Dinah Sheridan (1920–2012), actress
- Jean Simmons (1929–2010), actress
- Elizabeth Taylor (1932–2011), actress
- Emma Watson (born 1990), actress
- Rachel Weisz (born 1970), actress
- Kate Winslet (born 1975), actress
- Tessa Wyatt (born 1948), actress
- Susannah York (1939–2011), actress

== See also ==
- Rose Queen
- Peaches and cream (Wiktionary definition)
- Sonnet 18 (Shall I compare thee to a summer's day?)
- Yamato nadeshiko
- List of people known as the Beautiful
- List of people known as the Fair
- Southern belle
