= One Eye =

One Eye or One-Eye may refer to:

- One Eye Peak, British Columbia, Canada
- One Eye Lake, British Columbia
- One Eye River, Jamaica
- A character in the German fairy tale "One-Eye, Two-Eyes, and Three-Eyes"
- A character in the 2003 horror film Wrong Turn
- A character in the 2009 film Valhalla Rising

== See also ==
- List of people known as the One-Eyed
- List of one-eyed creatures in mythology and fiction
