= Rash (disambiguation) =

A rash is a change of the skin which affects its color, appearance, or texture.

Rash may also refer to:

== People ==
- Rash (surname)
- Rash Behari Bose (1886–1945), Indian revolutionary
- Rash Behari Ghosh (1845–1921), Indian politician, lawyer, social worker and philanthropist
- Rash Sarkar (born 1944), Indian former cricketer

== Arts and entertainment ==
- Rash (novel), a 2006 young adult novel
- Rash (film), a 2005 Australian documentary
- Rash!!, a manga series
- Rash Masum, a fictional character in the medical drama series Casualty
- Rash, one of the three Battletoads (characters) in the video game series, cartoon and comic strips

== Other uses ==
- Rash, Alabama, United States, an unincorporated community
- Red and Anarchist Skinheads, a left-wing, anti-racist, anti-fascist skinhead group

== See also ==
- List of people known as the Rash
- Rasher (disambiguation)
