= Prudent =

Prudent may refer to:

- Prudent (name)

Ships:

- HMS Prudent, a Royal Navy third-rate ship of the line
- USS Prudent (PG-96), a US Navy gunboat
- French ship Prudent, a French third-rate ship of the line burned at the Siege of Louisbourg (1758) by the British

== See also ==
- List of people known as the Prudent
- Prudence
