= Mild =

Mild may refer to:

- Mild ale, often simply referred to as mild
- Håkan Mild (born 1971), Swedish former footballer and current director of sports of IFK Göteborg
- Hans Mild (1934–2007), Swedish football, ice hockey, and bandy player
- An acronym for Mnemonic induction of lucid dreams, a technique developed by Stephen LaBerge to facilitate the occurrence of lucid dreaming

== See also ==
- List of people known as the Mild
