= Recluse (disambiguation) =

A recluse is a person who lives in voluntary seclusion and solitude.

Recluse or The Recluse may also refer to:

- Recluse, Wyoming, a town in the United States
- Recluse Nunatak, Alexander Island, Antarctica
- Recluse spider, a genus of venomous spiders
- Recluse butterflies of the genus Caenides
- "The Recluse" (Plan B song), a 2010 single from the British artist Plan B
- "The Recluse", a single from the 2003 album The Ugly Organ by the American band Cursive
- "The Recluse", an incomplete poem by William Wordsworth of which The Excursion and The Prelude are parts
- Recluse (film), an upcoming American mystery horror thriller film

== See also ==
- List of people known as the Recluse
- Recluse literature, a Japanese literary movement
