= Monoculus (disambiguation) =

Monoculus is a genus of succulent plants.

Monoculus (Latin for "one-eyed") may also refer to:

- John fitzRichard (fl. 1076–1086), Anglo-Norman nobleman nicknamed Monoculus
- Otto II, Duke of Brunswick-Göttingen (c. 1380–1463), nicknamed Monoculus
- Raymond IV, Count of Toulouse (c. 1041–1105), nicknamed Monoculus
- Peter Monoculus (died 1185), Cistercian abbot
- Monoculus, the journal of the World Association of Copepodologists

== See also ==
- List of people known as the One-Eyed
