= List of people known as the Terrible =

The Terrible or el Terrible is an epithet applied to:

- Afonso de Albuquerque (c. 1453–1515), Portuguese general, admiral and empire builder
- Ants Kaljurand (1917–1951), Estonian anti-Soviet guerrilla fighter
- Charles the Bold (1433–1477), last Valois Duke of Burgundy
- John III the Terrible (1521–1574), Voivode of Moldavia
- Ivan the Terrible (1530–1584), Tsar of Russia
- Ivan the Terrible (disambiguation), various other people
- Shingas (fl. 1740–1763), a Native American warrior and leader during the French and Indian Wars
- Iván Calderón (baseball) (1962–2003), Puerto Rican Major League Baseball player
- Ralph Toohy (1926–1999), Canadian Football League player
- Roger Touhy (1898–1959) and his brother Tommy Touhy, American gangsters in Chicago
- "Abdul the Terrible", nickname given a Turkish sniper assigned to kill Chinese-Australian sniper Billy Sing during World War I

In fiction and mythology:

- Humbaba, a giant in Akkadian mythology
- Ivy the Terrible, a character in The Beano comic strip
- Trigon (comics), a DC Comics villain

== See also ==
- El Terrible, ring name of Mexican wrestler Damián Gutiérrez Hernández (born 1976)
- El Terrible, ring name of Mexican boxer Erik Morales (born 1976)
- El Terrible, nickname of Mexican football goalkeeper Iván Vázquez Mellado (born 1982)
- Jason the Terrible, ring name of wrestler Karl Moffat (born 1960)
- Tiny the Terrible, ring name of wrestler Douglas Allen Tunstall Jr.
- Ted Lindsay (1925–2019), Canadian Hall-of-Fame ice hockey player nicknamed "Terrible Ted"
