= Rose Queen =

Honorific title for spring festivals

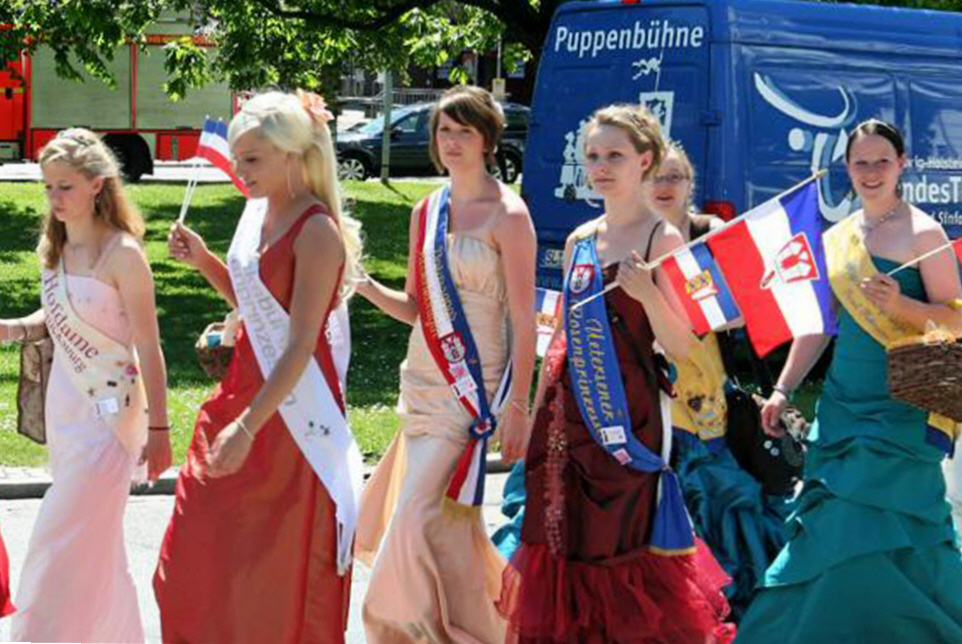
2010 Rendsburg (Germany) Rosenmajestäten by Frank Schwichtenberg

Rose Queen (or Apple Queen, Cotton Queen or Harvest Queen) is a local or regional tradition associated with Whitsun processions or June festivals and fêtes similar to May Queen. Annual civic honorific titles are bestowed by local election or decision of a council to particular individuals, typically local young women.

it is likely the Rose Queen tradition developed simply because it was the wrong time of year for a 'May' Queen. However, beyond the name, there is no discernible difference between the two, and sometimes they exist side-by-side. The Rose Queens main function is to act as a focal point (albeit a relatively inactive one) in the procession or fête to which she is linked, and in some cases to act as a temporary minor celebrity, gracing other local events with her presence during the year of her reign.

== History ==
It is a late Victorian invention originating from North West England. In the UK it has taken place in Cheshire, Derbyshire, Greater Manchester, Lancashire, Northwich, and Llandudno. In 1928 it was moved to Alexandra Rose Day. In the 20th-century it expanded to Nanterre near Paris. In America, a Rose Queen has been crowned in New York, West Virginia, and Texas Rose Festival.

== Today ==
Popularity of the tradition has decreased over the years. Present day Queen of the Rose Parade is crowned at the annual Rose Parade, Pasadena, California, which remains a major event. Popular saga author Katie Flynn has written a book titled The Rose Queen with the main characters as subjects of the tradition.

== See also ==
- Milk Queen
- Rose of Tralee an international pageant
- Walking day
- English rose (epithet)
