= List of people known as the Peaceful =

"The Peaceful" is an epithet applied to:

- Amadeus VIII, Duke of Savoy (1383–1451), also Antipope Felix V
- Aymon, Count of Savoy (1291–1343)
- Conrad I of Burgundy (c. 925–993), King of Burgundy
- Edgar, King of England (943–975)
- Henry the Peaceful, Duke of Brunswick-Lüneburg (1411–1473)
- Henry II, Duke of Brunswick-Lüneburg (before 1296–after 1351)
- Louis I, Landgrave of Hesse (1402–1458)
- Olaf III of Norway (c. 1050–1093), King of Norway

== See also ==
- List of people known as the Gentle
- List of people known as the Mild
- List of people known as the Warlike
