= List of people known as the Black =

The Black is an epithet for the following:

== People ==
- Ademar lo Negre (fl. 1210–1219) (English: Ademar the Black), French troubadour
- Alan the Black (died 1098), second lord of Richmond
- Alan, 1st Earl of Richmond (died 1146), Breton noble
- Benedict the Moor or the Black (1526–1589), Italian saint of the Catholic and Lutheran Churches
- Berthold Schwarz or the Black, 14th century Franciscan friar and alchemist who, according to legend, was the first European to discover gunpowder
- Cleitus the Black (c. 375 BC–328 BC), one of Alexander the Great's officers
- Dub, King of Scotland (died 967), called Niger ("the Black")
- Enrique of Malacca, a slave of Ferdinand Magellan also known as Henry the Black, probably the first person to circumnavigate the world
- Ermoldus Nigellus or Niger (fl. 824–830), translated Ermold the Black, a poet at the court of Pippin of Aquitaine
- Ewald the Black (died c. 695), one of the Two Ewalds, Christian saint and martyr
- Fulk III of Anjou (c. 987–1040), Count of Anjou
- Halfdan the Black (c. 810–c. 860), King of Vestfold (in present-day Norway)
- Halfdan Haraldsson the Black, Norwegian petty king and grandson of the above
- Henry III, Holy Roman Emperor (1017–1056)
- Henry IX, Duke of Bavaria (died 1126)
- Hugh the Black (died 952), Duke of Burgundy
- Jovan Nenad (c. 1492–1527), Serbian military leader who carved out his own state
- Leszek II the Black (c. 1241–1288), High Duke of the Kingdom of Poland
- Reginald II of Guelders (c. 1295–1343), Count and later Duke of Guelders
- Mikołaj Radziwiłł the Black (1515–1565), Lithuanian nobleman
- Moses the Black (330–405), ascetic monk and priest in Egypt, saint in various Christian faiths
- Muflih (eunuch), known as al-Aswad ("the Black"), early 10th century Abbasid Caliphate court eunuch and governor
- Olaf the Black (1173/4–1237), King of Mann and the Isles (mostly in present-day Scotland)
- Óttarr svarti or Óttarr the Black, 11th century Icelandic skald
- Pepy-ankh the black, ancient Egyptian vizier
- Theodore the Black (died 1298), Russian Orthodox saint
- Zawisza Czarny (c. 1379–1428), also known as Zawisza the Black of Garbów and the Black Knight, Polish nobleman, soldier and diplomat

== Legendary and fictional characters ==
- Saint Sarah, patron saint of the Romani people
- Ancalagon the Black, the greatest dragon in J. R. R. Tolkien's fantasy universe
- Ulfang the Black, a chieftain of the Easterlings (First Age) in Tolkien's universe
- Vykin the Black, the first black DC Comics superhero
- Goku Black (sometimes called Goku the Black), a Dragon Ball villain

== See also ==
- Kali, a Hindu goddess also known as "the black one"
- Surtr, a Norse jötunn whose name means "black" or "swarthy"
- Edward, the Black Prince (1330–1376), son of Edward III and father of Richard II
- Archibald Douglas, 3rd Earl of Douglas (1328-1400), Scottish nobleman also known as Black Archibald
- Karađorđe (1762-1817) ("Black George"), Serbian revolutionary leader
- Gwladus Ddu or "the Dark" (died 1251), Welsh princess
- Sam Bellamy (1689-1717) or "Black Sam" was an English pirate
- Bartholomew Roberts (1682-1722), or "Black Bart" or "Black Bart" Roberts was a Welsh pirate
- Black Baron (disambiguation)
- Black knight (disambiguation)
- List of people known as the White
- List of people known as the Red
