= List of people known as the Short =

The epithet the Short applies to the following:

- Charles III of Naples (1345–1386), King of Naples, titular King of Jerusalem and King of Hungary
- Dionysius Exiguus (c. 470 – c. 544), a monk, inventor of the Anno Domini era
- John the Dwarf (c. 339–c. 405), a Coptic Desert Father of the early Christian church
- Otto VI, Margrave of Brandenburg-Salzwedel (c. 1255 – 1303), member of the House of Ascania and co-ruler of Brandenburg
- Pepin the Short (c. 714 – 768), first King of the Franks, son of Charles Martel
- Władysław I Łokietek (1261 – 1333), King of Poland, also called "the Elbow-high"

== See also ==
- List of people known as the Small
- List of people known as the Tall
