= Fortunate =

Fortunate may refer to:

== People ==
- Fortunate Atubiga (born 1950), Ghanaian politician
- Fortunate Chidzivo (born 1987), Zimbabwean long-distance runner
- Fortunate Mafeta Phaka (born 1987), South African environmental scientist, author, television producer and science communicator
- Fortunate Thulare (born 1994), Botswanan footballer

== Songs ==
- "Fortunate" (song), a neo soul song written by R. Kelly and recorded by Maxwell for the 1999 motion picture Life
- "The Fortunate", a track on the album Cartel by the American rock band Cartel

== Other uses ==
- MSC Fortunate, a cargo ship also known as MV Fortune and MV Hyundai Fortune
- ST Fortunate, a tug
- Camp Fortunate, a Lewis and Clark Expedition campsite in August 1805

== See also ==
- List of people known as the Fortunate
- Fortune (disambiguation)
