= Dairy Queen (disambiguation) =

Dairy Queen (DQ) is an American fast food restaurant chain specializing in ice cream.

Dairy Queen may also refer to:

- Dairy Queen (novel), by Catherine Gilbert Murdock
- Milk Queen, a dairy industry promoter

== See also ==
- "Diary Queen", an episode of The Simpsons
