= Chasten =

Chasten may refer to:

- Chastity or chastening

== People ==
- Chasten Buttigieg (born 1989), husband of politician Pete Buttigieg
- Channing Chasten (born 2000), American soccer player
- Gamal Abdel Chasten, American poet and playwright

== See also ==
- Chaste
