= Strict (disambiguation) =

A strict relational operator in mathematics excludes the equal case.

Strict may also refer to:

- A strict function in programming languages, which fully evaluates all its arguments
- A strict programming language, where all user-defined functions are strict
- the strict pragma in the programming language Perl used to restrict unsafe constructs

== See also ==
- List of people known as the Strict
- Strict histories (or executions) in database transaction scheduling
