= Steadfast =

Steadfast may refer to:

- Steadfast (John Hicks album), 1991
- Steadfast (Forefather album), 2008
- RSS Steadfast, stealth frigate of the Republic of Singapore Navy
- USCGC Steadfast (WMEC-623), a United States coast guard cutter
- Steadfast (aircraft), a YAK-3U replica warbird and racing aircraft
- Steadfast (comics), a fictional character from DC Comics
- List of people known as the Steadfast, a list of people with the epithet of the Steadfast
