= The Drunkard (disambiguation) =

The Drunkard is an 1844 American temperance play.

The Drunkard may also refer to:

== Films ==
- The Drunkard (1935 film), an American drama
- The Drunkard (1937 film), a French drama
- The Drunkard (1950 film), a Greek drama
- The Drunkard (1953 film), a French drama
- Sharaabi, or Drunkard, a 1984 film by Prakash Mehra

== Other arts and entertainment ==
- The Drunkard, an 1898 Eugène Laermans painting
- "The Drunkard", a short story in the collection Traveller's Samples by Frank O'Connor
- The Drunkard, a poem by Ignacy Krasicki

== People ==
- List of people known as the Drunkard

== See also ==
- Kudimagan (English: Drunkard), a 2019 Indian Tamil-language film
