= List of people known as the Monk =

The Monk is an epithet for:

- Abraham the Monk, Christian monk who converted to Judaism about 614
- Cosmas the Monk, 7th-century Sicilian monk
- Epiphanius the Monk, 8th or 9th-century monk, priest, and author in Constantinople
- Eustace the Monk (c. 1170–1217), mercenary and pirate born near Boulogne
- Isaija the Monk, 14th-century Serbian monk, writer, translator and diplomat
- Jacob Chornoryzets, 11th-century Russian monk and author
- Jacob the Monk (Lebanon), 6th-century Christian monk
- Marina the Monk, 6th-century Christian saint
- Nikephoros the Monk, 13th-century monk and spiritual writer of the Eastern Orthodox Church
- Robert the Monk (d. 1122), Roman Catholic monk and a chronicler of the First Crusade
- Theodoric the Monk, 12th-century Norwegian Benedictine monk and historian
