= List of people known as the Valiant =

The Valiant is an epithet bestowed on:

== People ==
- Bolesław I the Brave (967–1025), first King of Poland
- Edgar, King of Scotland (c. 1074–1107), nicknamed Probus (the Valiant)
- Maurice de Berkeley, 4th Baron Berkeley (c. 1330–1368)
- Muhammad XIII, Sultan of Granada (c. 1444–c. 1494)
- Pharasmanes II of Iberia (died 138), a king of Iberia
- Theodoric II, Duke of Lorraine (died 1115)

== Fictional and legendary characters ==
- Halfdan the Valiant, a legendary figure in Norse sagas
- the title character of János vitéz ("John the Valiant"), an 1845 Hungarian epic poem
- Lucy Pevensie, co-ruler of the fictional land of Narnia as Queen Lucy the Valiant
- Volstagg, a character in the Marvel Comics universe

== See also ==
- List of people known as the Brave
- List of people known as the Courageous
- List of people known as the Fearless
