= List of people known as the Stout =

Persons known by the epithet the Stout include:

- Æthelmær the Stout (died 1015), Anglo-Saxon ealdorman of the western provinces (present day south-western England)
- Olaf II of Norway, King of Norway
- Sigurd the Stout (c. 960–1014), Earl of Orkney

== See also ==
- List of people known as the Fat
