= List of people known as the Angel =

The epithet the Angel may refer to:

- Francita Alavez, Angel of Goliad.
- Maura Clarke, Angel of the Land.
- Clara Barton, Angel of the Battlefield.
- Donaldina Cameron (1869–1968), Angry Angel of Chinatown.
- Rose Livingston, Angel of Chinatown.
- Billie Holiday, Angel of Harlem

== See also ==
- Angel of Death (disambiguation)
- Angel of Harlem
