= List of people known as the Red =

The Red is an epithet which may refer to:

- Aslanbech the Red-Mustached (1657–1746), nicknamed "the Red" (Karachay-Balkar: Сары) in Balkar and Ossetian folklore
- Daniel Cohn-Bendit (born 1945), known as Dany le rouge, meaning "Danny the Red", German politician
- Erik the Red (950–c. 1003), founder of the first Nordic settlement in Greenland
- Fulk I, Count of Anjou (c. 870–942), also Count of Tours and Count of Nantes
- Håkan the Red, a king of Sweden in the second half of the 11th century
- Hector Roy Mackenzie (died 1528), progenitor of the Mackenzies of Gairloch
- Hugh of Sully, 13th century general under the Sicilian King Charles of Anjou, nicknamed "le Rousseau" ("the Red")
- John Comyn III of Badenoch (c. 1274–1306), Scottish nobleman
- Konrad III Rudy (1447/48–1503), Polish prince and duke
- Odo I, Duke of Burgundy (1060–1102)
- Otto II, Holy Roman Emperor, (955-983); ruled from 972-983
- Thorstein the Red, a Viking chieftain in late ninth-century Scotland
- William II of England, a king of England nicknamed "William Rufus", meaning "William the Red".

== See also ==
- List of people known as the Black
- List of people known as the White
