= List of people known as the Merciful =

The epithet the Merciful may refer to:

- Ashot III of Armenia (died 977), Armenian king
- John the Merciful (c. 552-between 616 and 620), Patriarch of Alexandria and Christian saint

== See also ==
- John the Hairy, also known as John the Merciful of Rostov, a 16th-century holy fool (yurodivy) of the Russian Orthodox Church
- Ming the Merciless, the main villain in the Flash Gordon comic strip and related works
- Mordru the Merciless, the villain in the DC Comics story arc of the same name
