= List of people known as the Unfortunate =

The Unfortunate is an epithet which may refer to:

- James II, Count of Urgell (1380–1433), also Viscount of Àger, and lord of Antillón, Alcolea de Cinca, and Fraga
- James III of Majorca (1315–1349), King of Majorca from 1324 to 1344
- Piero the Unfortunate (1472–1503), Gran maestro (unofficial head of state) of Florence from 1492 to 1494
- Stephanie Alfonso of Castile (1139/1148–1180), murdered by her husband

== See also ==
- List of people known as the Fortunate
- List of people known as Lucky or the Lucky
