= List of people known as the Tall =

The Tall is an epithet which may refer to:

People:

- Albert I, Duke of Brunswick-Lüneburg and Prince of Wolfenbüttel (1236–1279)
- Bolesław I the Tall (1127–1201), Duke of Wroclaw
- Knut Långe (died 1234), King of Sweden
- Philip V of France (1292–1322), King of France
- Stefan Lazarević, Serbian Despot (1402–27)
- Thorkell the Tall, a Viking in the tenth and early eleventh centuries

Fictional characters:

- Elendil the Tall, in J.R.R. Tolkien's fantasy universe
- Duncan the Tall, in George R. R. Martin's fantasy universe A Song of Ice & Fire

== See also ==
- Henry the Long (c. 1065–1087), Margrave of the Nordmark and Count of Stade
- List of people known as the Short
