= List of people known as the Simple =

The epithet "the Simple" may refer to:

- Abraham the Poor or the Simple (died 372), Egyptian hermit and saint
- Bagrat II of Iberia (937–994), King of (Caucasian) Iberia
- Charles the Simple (879-929), King of France
- Frederick the Simple (1341-1377), King of Sicily
- Paul the Simple (died c. 339), Christian saint, monk and hermit
- William, Count of Sully (c. 1085–c. 1150), also Count of Blois and Count of Chartres
