= List of people known as the Little =

The epithet the Little typically indicates relatively smaller stature as opposed to relative age (i.e. 'the younger'), although it also is sometimes a rendering of "humble" for translations of epithets into English. People who were known by this epithet include:

- Amyntas II of Macedon, briefly King of Macedon around 394/3 BC
- Dionysius Exiguus (c. 470–c. 544), monk who invented the Anno Domini method of dating
- Šćepan Mali (died 1773), ruler of Montenegro
- Sigeberht the Little (died 653), King of Essex

== See also ==
- List of people known as the Small
