= List of people known as the Mighty =

The Mighty is an epithet for:

== People ==
- Stefan Dušan (c. 1308–1355), King of Serbia and Emperor of the Serbs and Greeks
- Sigurd Eysteinsson, Earl of Orkney (c. 875–892)
- Sholokh the Mighty, Grand Prince of Kabardia (1609–1616)
- Thorfinn the Mighty (1009?–c. 1064?), Earl of Orkney

== Fictional characters ==
- Gorzo the Mighty, writer for The Onion
- Joxer the Mighty, recurring character in the Hercules and Xena television series
- Morgyn the Mighty, comic strip character
- Tharg the Mighty, recurring character in science fiction comic 2000 AD
- Woden the Mighty, video game character from MediEvil
