= Keri Noble =

American singer-songwriter (born 1975)

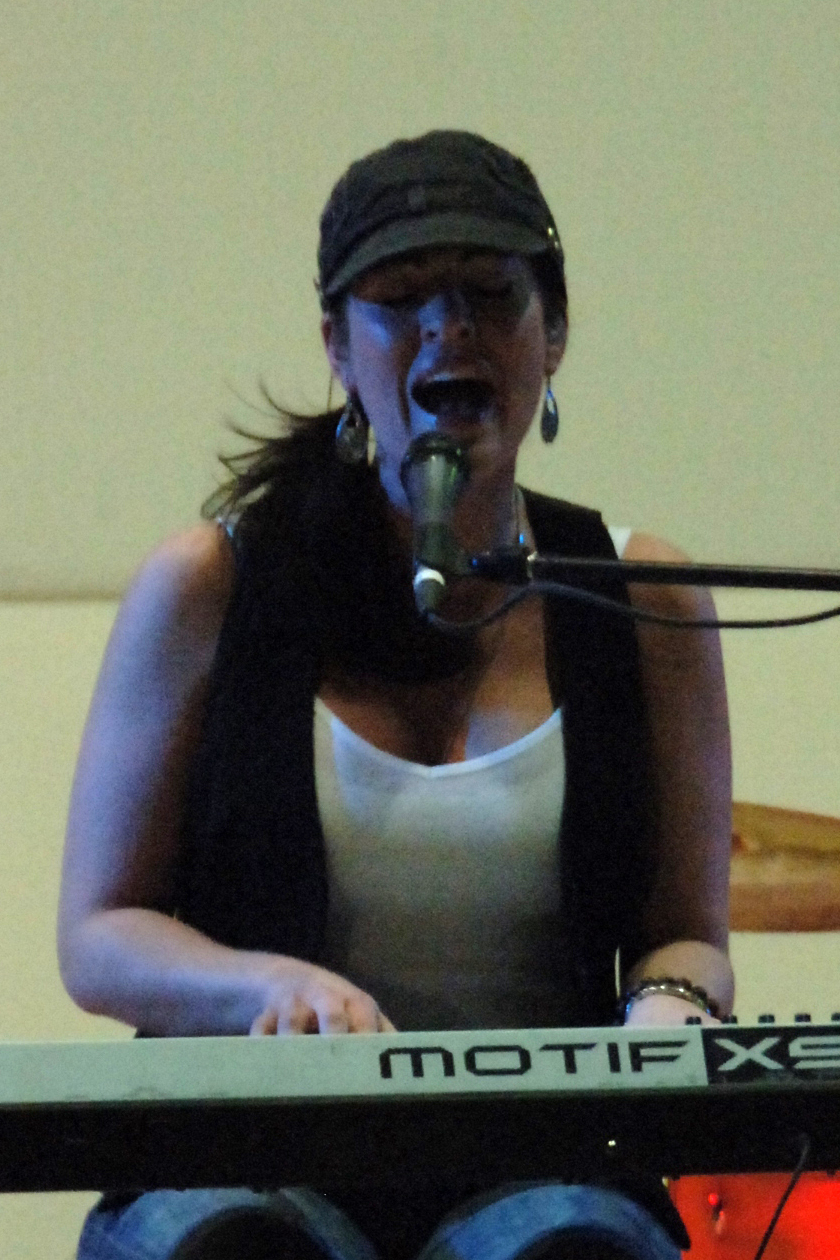
- Noble in 2010
- Born: 1975 (age 50–51)

Keri Noble (born 1975) is an American singer-songwriter born in Fort Worth, Texas and raised in Detroit. Her father was a Baptist minister, and Noble sang in church as a child. She attended a local Assembly of God school for Junior High and high school in Michigan. She began playing her own music in the Detroit area. After meeting Billy McLaughlin, she moved to Minneapolis, and in 2003 she signed with major label EMI. She has been compared to Norah Jones. She left EMI in 2005 and signed with JVC in Japan where she achieved great success, enabling her to continue to write and perform in the US without the support of a label.

In 2008 Noble signed with Telarc Records in the United States and released a full-length album (self titled) in February 2009. In June, she released her EP, "Leave Me in the Dark", and November brought the release of her first-ever holiday cd, "Winter Comes Again", which she produced herself.

Currently, Noble resides in Minneapolis.

In April 2012 Noble began co-hosting the morning show on KTCZ-FM ("Cities 97") in Minneapolis, MN. After 7 years, she left the show to pursue a career in vocal lessons to fellow singers.

Noble's song "If No One Will Listen" has been covered by Kelly Clarkson and is featured on her album All I Ever Wanted.

== Discography ==
Albums

- 2002 Lullaby (Raven)
- 2005 Fearless (Manhattan)
- 2007 Let Go (JVC)
- 2008 Leave Me in the Dark
- 2008 Winter Comes Again
- 2009 Keri Noble (LP, Telarc Records)
- 2010 When It Don't Come Easy
- 2010 Flying Solo
- 2011 More Than Santa
- 2014 Softer Place To Land
- 2016 Find My Way Home
- 2025 Back to Life

Guest Appearances

- 2002 Son of Adam "Waiting for the Radio"
