= List of people known as the Strong =

The Strong is an epithet for the following:

- Ale the Strong, a mythological king of Sweden
- Augustus II the Strong (1670–1733), Elector of Saxony (as Frederick Augustus I) and King of Poland and Grand Duke of Lithuania (as Augustus II)
- Leopold of Styria (died 1129), Margrave of Styria
- Magnus the Strong (1106–1134), Danish duke, possibly also king of Sweden
- Raud the Strong, Norse Seid priest and warrior in the late tenth century
- Robert the Strong (820–866), Margrave in Neustria
- Sancho II of Castile and León (1036/1038–1072), King of Castile, Galicia and León
- Sancho VII of Navarre (1154–1234), King of Navarre
- Stefan Dušan (1308–1355), King and Emperor of Serbia
- Styrbjörn the Strong, a Viking rebel in Norse sagas who may have been slain in the 980s

== See also ==
- Stefan Uroš V (1336–1371), ruler of the Serbian Empire known as Uroš Nejaki ("the Weak")
- Henry IV of Castile (1425–1474), King of Castile nicknamed "the Impotent"
