= List of people known as the Courageous =

The Courageous is an epithet borne by:

- Albert III, Duke of Saxony (1443–1500)
- Bayburtlu Kara Ibrahim Pasha, Grand Vizier of the Ottoman Empire from 1683 to 1685, Ottoman governor of Egypt from 1669 to 1673
- Godfrey I, Count of Louvain (c. 1060–1139), Landgrave of Brabant, Count of Brussels and Leuven, Duke of Lower Lorraine and Margrave of Antwerp
- Henry I, Duke of Brabant (c. 1165–1235)
- Kara Musa Pasha (died 1649), Ottoman Grand Vizier of the Ottoman Empire, Kapudan Pasha (commander-in-chief of the Ottoman navy)
- Kara Mustafa Pasha (1634/1635–1683), Ottoman Albanian Grand Vizier of the Ottoman Empire, military leader and governor of Silistria
- Kemankeş Kara Mustafa Pasha (1592–1644), Ottoman Albanian Grand Vizier of the Ottoman Empire, Kapudan Pasha and Janissary officer

== See also ==
- List of people known as the Brave
- List of people known as the Fearless
- List of people known as the Valiant
