= List of people known as the Grim =

The epithet "the Grim" may refer to:

- Archibald Campbell, 7th Earl of Argyll (c. 1575–1638), also called "Gillesbuig Grumach" ("Archibald the Grim"), Scottish politician and military leader
- Archibald Douglas, 3rd Earl of Douglas (1328–1400), Scottish magnate
- Selim I (1470–1520), Sultan of the Ottoman Empire
- Hogun, a Marvel Comics character

== See also ==
- Grim Tuesday, a character from the Keys to the Kingdom children's book series
- Chris Reitsma (born 1977), former Major League Baseball pitcher nicknamed "the Grim Reitsma"
- List of people known as the Cruel
