= List of people known as the Generous =

The epithet "the Generous" may refer to:

- Bolesław II the Generous (c. 1041/2–1081 or 1082), third king of Poland
- Bolesław III the Generous (1291–1352), Duke of Legnica, Brzeg and Wroclaw
- Otto II, Margrave of Brandenburg (after 1147–1205)
- Leopold, Duke of Bavaria (c. 1108–1141)

== See also ==
- List of people known as the Magnanimous
