= List of people known as the White =

The epithet "the White" may refer to:

== People ==
- Cleitus the White (died 318 BC), an officer of Alexander the Great
- Konrad X the White (1420–1492), Duke of Oleśnica, Koźle, Bytom and half of Ścinawa
- Leszek I the White (c. 1186–1227), Prince of Sandomierz and High Duke of Poland
- Olaf the White, a Viking sea-king of the latter half of the 9th century
- Otto III, Duke of Swabia (died 1057), also Margrave of the Nordgau
- Władysław the White (between 1327 and 1333–1388), Duke of Gniewkowo

== Legendary and fictional characters ==
- Elyan the White, a Knight of the Round Table in Arthurian legend
- Gaheris of Karaheu, another Knight of the Round Table
- Gandalf, in J.R.R. Tolkien's The Lord of the Rings
- Saruman, in J.R.R. Tolkien's The Lord of the Rings
- Tirant the White, protagonist of the Catalan romance Tirant lo Blanch, published in 1490

== See also ==
- List of people known as the Black
- List of people known as the Red
