= List of people known as the Bearded =

The Bearded is an epithet of:

- Baldwin IV, Count of Flanders (980–1035)
- Constans II (630–668), ruler of the Byzantine Empire
- Eberhard I, Duke of Württemberg (1445–1496)
- Geoffrey III, Count of Anjou (c. 1040–1096)
- George, Duke of Saxony (1471–1539), known for his opposition to the Protestant Reformation
- Godfrey the Bearded (c. 997–1069), Duke of Upper and Lower Lorraine
- Gwynllyw (c. 450–500), Welsh king and saint, known in English in a corrupted form as Woolos the Bearded
- Henry the Bearded (c. 1165/70–1238), Duke of Silesia at Wrocław, Duke of Kraków and High Duke of all Poland
- Louis VII, Duke of Bavaria (c. 1368–1447)

== See also ==
- Constantine IV (c. 652–685), Byzantine emperor sometimes incorrectly called "the Bearded" out of confusion with his father, Constans II
