= Red Baron (disambiguation) =

Manfred von Richthofen (1892–1918), known famously as the Red Baron, was a German fighter pilot during World War I.

Red Baron may also refer to:

== People ==
- Éric Barone (born 1960), French sportsman and world record cyclist
- Robert Ludvigovich Bartini (1897–1974), also known as Roberto Oros di Bartini, Italian aircraft designer and scientist
- Red Berenson, head hockey coach at University of Michigan (1984–2017) and former NHL player (1967–1978)
- Erik Palmstierna (1877–1959), Swedish baron and Social democratic politician
- Michael Schumacher (born 1969), German Formula One motor racing champion
- Rick Sutcliffe (born 1956), American former professional baseball pitcher

== Arts and entertainment ==
=== Fictional characters ===
- Red Baron, an unseen antagonist of the dog Snoopy in the Peanuts comic strip by Charles M. Schulz
- Red Baron, a character controlled by the first player in Namco's 1985 arcade game Sky Kid

=== Film and television ===
- Von Richthofen and Brown or The Red Baron, a 1971 war film by Roger Corman
- The Red Baron (1972 film), a 1972 animated made-for-TV film produced by Rankin/Bass Productions; originally aired on The ABC Saturday Superstar Movie
- Super Robot Red Baron, a 1973 Japanese tokusatsu television series
- Red Baron (anime), a 1994 Japanese anime television series based on Super Robot Red Baron
- The Red Baron (2008 film), a German film about Manfred von Richthofen

=== Games ===
- Red Baron (1980 video game), an arcade game by Atari
- Red Baron (1990 video game), a PC combat flight simulator by Dynamix

=== Music ===
- "Snoopy vs. the Red Baron" (song), a 1966 novelty song
- Red Baron Records, a jazz record label
- The Red Baron (band), an American Christian and straight edge band
- "Red Baron", a song by Billy Cobham from Spectrum
- "The Red Baron", a song by Game Theory from Distortion
- "The Red Baron", a song by Sabaton from the album The Great War
- "Red Baron/Blue Max", a song by Iced Earth from the album The Glorious Burden

== Sports teams ==
- Scranton/Wilkes-Barre Red Barons (1989–2006), a former minor league affiliate of the Philadelphia Phillies in Scranton, Pennsylvania
- Red Barons Cologne (1982–1991), an American football club in Cologne, Germany

== Vehicles and aeronautics ==
- N104RB Red Baron, a privately owned F104 jet which set a world speed record
- Project Red Baron, a United States Air Force study into air-to-air combat during the Vietnam War
- RB51 Red Baron, an Unlimited World Champion racing aircraft which set a world speed record
- The Red Baron (custom car), a custom t-bucket hot rod built in 1969
- Red Baron Squadron (1979–2007), an aerobatics team sponsored by Red Baron frozen pizza

== Other uses ==
- Red Baron (ride), an amusement park ride
- Red Baron, a common street name of dextromethorphan
- Red Baron, a species of dragonfly in the genus Urothemis
- Red Baron, an American brand of frozen pizza sold by Schwan's Company
- Red Baron, a nickname for the invasive grass seed Imperata cylindrica
- Red Baron, a popular variety of red onion

== See also ==
- Barão Vermelho, a Brazilian rock band
- Barón Rojo, a Spanish hard rock/heavy metal band
- Black Baron (disambiguation)
