= List of people known as the Silent =

The Silent is an epithet applied to:

- John the Silent (452–558), Christian saint
- Secundus the Silent, second century Cynic or Neopythagorean philosopher
- William the Silent (1533–1584), Prince of Orange, main leader of the Dutch revolt against the Spanish
