= List of people known as the Magnanimous =

The epithet the Magnanimous may refer to:

- Albert II of Germany (1397-1439), King of Hungary, Bohemia, and Germany
- Alfonso V of Aragon (1396-1458), King of Aragon, Valencia, Majorca, Sardinia and Corsica, Sicily, and Naples
- Charles II, Count of Alençon (1297-1346)
- John V of Portugal (1689-1750), King of Portugal and the Algarves
- John Frederick I, Elector of Saxony (1503-1554), head of the Protestant Schmalkaldic League
- Ladislaus of Naples (1377-1414), King of Naples
- Maurice de Berkeley, 2nd Baron Berkeley (1271-1326)
- Otto V, Duke of Brunswick-Lüneburg (1439-1471), also Prince of Lüneburg
- Pedro II of Brazil (1825-1891), Emperor of Brazil
- Philip I, Landgrave of Hesse (1504-1567), a leading champion of the Protestant Reformation

== See also ==
- List of people known as the Generous
