= List of people known as the Resolute =

The epithet "the Resolute" may refer to:

- Esbern Snare (1127–1204), Danish royal chancellor and Crusader
- Selim I (1470–1520), 9th sultan of the Ottoman Empire
