= Chaste =

Chaste refers to practicing chastity.

Chaste may also refer to:

- Aymar Chaste (1514–1603), Catholic French admiral
- Chaste (Marvel Comics), a fictional Marvel Comics martial arts enclave
- Chaste (canton) - see List of townships in Quebec, Canada
- ChaSTE, scientific instrument onboard India's Chandrayaan-3's lander to conduct Lunar surface's thermophysical experiment.
- Chaste tree and berries, common name for Vitex agnus-castus

== See also ==
- List of people known as the Chaste
