= List of people known as the Hairy =

The Hairy is an epithet applied to:

- John the Hairy (died 1580), a holy fool (yurodivy) of the Russian Orthodox Church
- Wilfred the Hairy (died 897), Count of Urgell, Cerdanya, Barcelona, Girona, Besalú, and Ausona

== See also ==
- List of people known as the Bald
