= Rasher =

Rasher or Rashers may refer to:

- Rasher (artist), an Irish figurative artist
- Rasher (comics), a British comic strip
- Rasher, a slice of bacon, chiefly used in Hiberno-English
- Rasher, a recurring character in the TV series Blood Drive
- Rashers Tierney, a character on Strumpet City played by David Kelly
- Sebastes miniatus, a fish also known as the vermilion rockfish
- USS Rasher, a former US Navy vessel

== See also ==
- Rash (disambiguation)
