= Ivan IV (disambiguation) =

Ivan IV, or Ivan the Terrible, was a ruler of Russia.

Ivan IV may also refer to:

- Ivan IV (opera), by Georges Bizet, 1865
- Ivan IV of Ryazan (1467–1500), ruler of the Grand Duchy of Ryazan

== See also ==
- Ivan the Terrible (disambiguation)
