= List of people known as the Warlike =

The epithet "the Warlike" may refer to:

- Albert Alcibiades, Margrave of Brandenburg-Kulmbach (1522–1557)
- Crimthann the Warlike, 8th century Irish individual whose identity is uncertain - see Aedh Ailghin
- Frederick I, Elector of Saxony (1370–1428), also Margrave of Meissen
- Frederick II, Duke of Austria (1211–1246), Duke of Austria and of Styria
- Michael VI Bringas (died 1059), Byzantine emperor from 1056 to 1057

== See also ==
- Aphrodite Areia ("Aphrodite the Warlike"), a cult epithet of the Greek goddess Aphrodite
- List of people known as the Peaceful
