= List of people known as the Mad =

The Mad is an epithet applied to:

- Haakon the Crazy or the Mad (died 1214), Norwegian earl
- Othenin, Count of Montbéliard (died 1338)
- Charles VI of France (1369–1422), King of France
- George II of Kakheti (1469–1513), King of Kakheti
- Jan II the Mad (1435–1504), Duke of Żagań-Przewóz, Przewóz, Żagań and half-Głogów
- Joanna of Castile (1479–1555), first queen regnant of Castile of Aragon, queen of Sardinia, Sicily and Naples
- John II, Count of Rietberg (after 1523–1562)
- Ibrahim (1615–1648), sultan of the Ottoman Empire
- Maria I of Portugal (1734–1816), first undisputed queen regnant of Portugal
- Mustafa I (1600-1639), sultan of the Ottoman Empire

== See also ==
- Antiochus IV Epiphanes (c. 215 BC–164 BC), ruler of the Seleucid Empire sometimes called Epimanes ("the mad one")
- Al-Hakim bi-Amr Allah (996–1021), called the Mad Caliph in Western literature
- Odo I, Count of Vermandois, Count of Vermanois from 1080 to 1085, called "the Insane"
- George III (1738–1820), King of Great Britain and of Ireland, called the Mad King
- Mad King Ludwig II of Bavaria (1845–1886)
- Norman the Lunatic, a ring name of Mike Shaw (1957–2010), American professional wrestler
- Dagur the Deranged, character in the animated television series DreamWorks Dragons
