= List of people known as the Fearless =

The Fearless is an epithet which may refer to:

- Gerald the Fearless (died probably 1173), Portuguese warrior and folk hero of the Reconquista
- John the Fearless (1371–1419), Duke of Burgundy
- Richard I, Duke of Normandy (933–996)

== See also ==
- Fearless (disambiguation)
- List of people known as the Brave
- List of people known as the Courageous
- List of people known as the Valiant
