= List of people known as the Mild =

The epithet "the Mild" may refer to:

- Gautrekr the Mild, a legendary Geatish king
- Halfdan the Mild, a Norwegian petty king of Romerike and Vestfold
- Henry the Mild, Duke of Brunswick-Lüneburg (died 1416), a prince during the latter part of his life
- John III, Count of Holstein-Plön (c. 1297–1359)
- Otto the Mild, Duke of Brunswick-Lüneburg (1282–1344)

== See also ==
- List of people known as the Peaceful
- List of people known as the Gentle
- List of people known as the Wild
