= List of people known as the Lion =

The Lion is an epithet used to describe:

- Henry the Lion (1129–1195), Duke of Saxony and Duke of Bavaria
- Louis VIII of France (1187–1226), King of France
- Umur of Aydın (1309?–1348), Emir of Aydin
- William the Lion (c. 1143–1214), King of the Scots from 1165 to 1214

== See also ==
- Robert III, Count of Flanders (1249–1322), the "Lion of Flanders"
- Ali Pasha of Ioannina (1740–1822), Ottoman pasha known as the "Lion of Yannina"
- Pierre Philippe Denfert-Rochereau (1823–1878), French colonel known as the "Lion of Belfort" for leading the defense of Belfort during the Franco-Prussian War
- Philippe Pétain (1856–1951), French field marshal and leader of Vichy France known as the "Lion of Verdun"
- Richard I of England (1157–1199), King of England known as Richard the Lionheart
- Sam "the Lion", a character in the 1971 film The Last Picture Show
