= Prudent (name) =

Prudent is both a given name and a surname. Notable people with the name include:

Given name:

- Prudent de Narbonne (died c. 257), Archdeacon of Narbonne
- Prudent Beaudry (1818–1893), mayor of Los Angeles
- Prudent Carpentier (1922–2019), Canadian politician
- Prudent Joye (1913–1980), French track and field runner

Surname:

- Émile Prudent (1817–1863), French pianist and composer

== See also ==
- List of people known as the Prudent
