= List of people known as the Learned =

The Learned is an epithet which may refer to:

- Arngrímur Jónsson (1568–1648), Icelandic scholar and apologist
- Coloman, King of Hungary (c. 1070–1116), also called the Book-Lover and the Bookish
- Ferdinand VI (1713–1759), King of Spain
- Jacob I the Learned, Catholicos of the Armenian Apostolic Church between 1268 and 1286
- Maurice, Landgrave of Hesse-Kassel (1572–1632), a landgrave in the Holy Roman Empire
- Sæmundr fróði (1056–1133), Icelandic priest and scholar

== See also ==
- List of people known as the Wise
