= List of people known as the Navigator =

The Navigator is an epithet which may refer to:

- Brendan (c. 484–c. 577), Irish monastic saint
- Hanno the Navigator, Carthaginian explorer c. 500 BC and nominal king of Carthage from 480 to 440 BC
- Prince Henry the Navigator (1394-1460), an important figure in Portuguese explorations
- Himilco the Navigator, Carthaginian explorer during the late 6th or early 5th century BC
