= List of people known as the Handsome =

The epithet the Handsome may refer to:

- Demetrius the Fair (c. 285 BC–249 BC), King of Cyrene
- Ferdinand I of Portugal (1345–1383), King of Portugal
- Frederick the Fair (c. 1289–1330), King of Germany and Duke of Austria and Styria
- Geoffrey Plantagenet, Count of Anjou (1113–1151), Duke of Normandy
- Philibert II, Duke of Savoy (1480–1504)
- Philip I of Castile (1478–1506), first Habsburg King of Castile
- Radu the Handsome (1435–1475), Prince of Wallachia and younger brother of Vlad Ţepeş (better known as Vlad the Impaler)
- Ara the Handsome, legendary Armenian hero

== See also ==
- List of people known as the Beautiful
- List of people known as the Fair
