= Baldy (nickname) =

Baldy or Baldie is a nickname for:

- Brian Baldinger (born 1959), American football player and broadcaster
- Mark Baldwin (baseball) (1863–1929), American professional baseball player
- Fred Brown (ice hockey) (1900–1970), Canadian National Hockey League player
- Dominick Canterino (died 1990), American mobster convicted for racketeering, nicknamed "Baldy Dom"
- Baldwin Cooke (1888–1953), American comedic actor, also known as "Baldy Cooke"
- Harold Cotton (ice hockey) (1902–1984), Canadian National Hockey League player
- Wayne Fox (born 1959), former Australian rules footballer
- F. A. Harper (1905–1973), American academic, economist and writer
- Arthur Hezlet (1914–2007), Royal Navy vice-admiral
- Brian Keith Jones (born 1947), Australian child molester nicknamed "Mr. Baldy" for shaving his victims' hair
- Henry Jones (pitcher), American Major League Baseball pitcher in 1890
- Benn Karr (1893–1968), American Major League Baseball pitcher
- Alan Longo (born 1950), alleged Brooklyn mobster convicted of racketeering, nicknamed "Baldie"
- Bill Louden (1883–1935), American Major League Baseball player
- Calum MacKay (ice hockey) (1927–2001), Canadian National Hockey League player
- Baldy Northcott (1908–1986), Canadian National Hockey League player
- Eddie Palmer (baseball) (1893–1983), American Major League Baseball player in 1917
- Charles Alan Pownall (1887–1975), US Navy rear admiral and Governor of Guam
- Baldy Jack Rose (1987–1947), American gambler and mobster in New York City born Jacob Rosenzweig
- Ed Silch (1865–1895), American Major League Baseball player in the 1888 season
- William Farrar Smith (1824–1903), Union general in the American Civil War
- Vince Sherlock (1910–1997), American Major League Baseball player in 1935
- Charles Spittal (1874–1971), Canadian hockey player, one of the first to play professionally
- Blaine Thomas (1888–1915), American Major League Baseball pitcher
- Dave Tomlinson (Canadian football) (c. 1926–in or after 1998), Canadian Football League player
- Baldy Wittman (c. 1871–?), professional football player in the Ohio League (1903–1911)

== See also ==
- Ramón Díaz (born 1959), Argentine former footballer and coach nicknamed El Pelado ("Baldy")
- List of people known as the Bald
