= List of people known as the Brave =

The Brave is an epithet applied to the following:

== People ==
- Alfonso VI of León and Castile (before 1040–1109), King of León, King of Castile and de facto King of Galicia
- Ashot IV of Armenia (died c. 1040–1041), King of Armenia
- Bolesław I the Brave (967–1025), Duke of Poland, Duke of Bohemia (as Boleslav IV), and the first King of Poland
- John III the Terrible (1521–1574), Voivode of Moldavia
- Michael the Brave (1558–1601), Prince of Wallachia, of Transylvania, and of Moldavia
- Opos the Brave (fl. 1067 – c. 1074), Hungarian legendary knight
- Poto the Brave (fl. 1060), Bavarian count palatine
- Seqenenre Tao (c. 1558–1555 BCE), Pharaoh of Thebes
- Temruqo the Brave (1502–1571), Grand Prince of Kabardia
- Thimo the Brave, Count of Wettin and Brehna (c. 1010–1090 or 1091 or c. 1100)
- Ulf the Brave, a Norwegian hersir (military leader) of the early ninth century

== Fictional characters ==
- Balder the Brave, a Marvel Comics character

== See also ==
- List of people known as the Courageous
- List of people known as the Fearless
- List of people known as the Valiant
