= List of people known as the Fortunate =

The Fortunate is an epithet applied to the following:

People:

- Dietrich, Count of Oldenburg (c. 1398–1440)
- Duncan Campbell, 1st Lord Campbell (died 1453), Scottish politician and longtime head of Clan Campbell
- Manuel I of Portugal (1469–1521), King of Portugal
- Philip VI of France (1293–1350), King of France

Fictional characters:

- the protagonist of the novel Bellarion the Fortunate by Rafael Sabatini

== See also ==
- List of people known as the Lucky
- List of people known as the Unfortunate
- Fortunate (disambiguation)
