= List of people known as the Cruel =

The epithet the Cruel has been applied to the following:

== People ==
- Boleslaus I, Duke of Bohemia (died 967 or 972)
- Fruela I of Asturias (died 768), King of Asturias
- Peter of Castile (1334–1369), King of Castile and León
- Selim I, (1470–1520) Ottoman Sultan

== Fictional characters ==
- Gorthaur the Cruel, another name for Sauron, villain of The Lord of the Rings
- Kalibak, a DC Comics deity and supervillain
- Kiber the Cruel, a Marvel Comics supervillain
- Kjotve the Cruel, in the video game Assassin's Creed Valhalla
- Maegor the Cruel, a villainous king from the fantasy novel Fire & Blood
- Slagar the Cruel, a villain from the children's novel Mattimeo

== See also ==
- List of people known as the Grim
