= Black Baron =

Black Baron may refer to:

== People nicknamed Black Baron ==
- Pyotr Wrangel (1878–1928), Russian White Army commander
- Benoît de Bonvoisin (born 1939), Belgian baron and politician
- Chris Pile (programmer) (born 1969), British programmer and computer criminal
- Terry Funk (1944–2023), American pro wrestler
- Michael Wittmann (1914–1944), German Waffen-SS commander
- Roman von Ungern-Sternberg (1885–1921), Russian anticommunist general and warlord
- Robert Munro, 18th Baron of Foulis (died 1633), Scottish soldier of fortune
- Hugh Rose of Kilravock, the tenth Laird of the Highland Scottish Clan Rose

== Arts, entertainment, and media ==
- The Black Barons, a Swiss country-folk music band
- Black Baron, a character in the Sly Cooper video game series
- The Black Baron, a character in the Overlord: Dark Legend video game
- Black Baron, a character in the French TV series Super 4
- Black Baron, a vampire in Marvel Comics
- Black Baron, a character from the 2009 Wii game MadWorld

== Other uses ==
- Birmingham Black Barons, Negro leagues baseball team, Birmingham, Alabama, 1920–1960
- Black Baron, Pennsylvania, in Lancaster County, Pennsylvania
- Black Barons (book), a novel by Miloslav Svandrlik
- Black Barons, Special Designation for the 18th Aviation Brigade (United States)

== See also ==
- Black baronets, two baronetcies created for persons with the surname Black
- Black Barony, a historic house at Eddleston in the Scottish Borders
- Red Baron (disambiguation)
- White Army, Black Baron, Red Army song
