= List of people known as the Wild =

"The Wild" is an epithet applied to:

- Eadric the Wild (fl. 1068–1070), Anglo-Saxon magnate who led the resistance to the Norman Conquest
- John V, Count of Hoya (c. 1395–1466)
- Cyledr Wyllt, a warrior and madman in Welsh mythology and in the Arthurian tale Culhwch and Olwen

== See also ==
- Charles William Frederick, Margrave of Brandenburg-Ansbach (1712-1757), nicknamed the "Wild Margrave"
- List of people known as the Mild
