= List of people known as the Bald =

"The Bald" is an epithet for the following:

== People ==
- Ælfheah the Bald (died 951), Bishop of Winchester
- Baldwin II, Margrave of Flanders (c. 865–918), nicknamed Calvus (the Bald)
- Bolesław II the Horned (c. 1220/5–1278), Duke of Kraków (1241), Southern Greater Poland (1241–1247), Silesia-Wroclaw (1241–1248), and Środa Śląska (from 1277)
- Charles the Bald (823-877), Holy Roman Emperor and King of West Francia
- Constantine III of Scotland (before 971–997), King of Scots, called Calvus (the Bald)
- Hasdrubal the Bald, a Carthaginian general in the Second Punic War
- Henry I the Bald, Count of Stade, member of the Saxony nobility, cousin of Otto I
- Idwal Foel (died c. 942), King of Gwynedd in Wales
- Ladislas the Bald (before 997–before 1030), a member of the House of Árpád and a grandson of Taksony, Grand Prince of the Hungarians
- Owain Foel (fl. 1018), King of the Cumbrians, also known as Eugenius Calvus
- Prokop the Great (1380–1434), a general of the Hussite movement
- Rodrigo Fernández de Castro, (died after 1144), a Castilian nobleman and soldier called el Calvo (the Bald)

== Mythological figures ==
- Conán mac Morna, also known as Conán Maol ("the Bald"), a member of the fianna in the Fenian Cycle of Irish mythology

== See also ==
- Baldy (nickname)
- List of people known as the Hairy
