= List of people known as the Lucky =

The epithet the Lucky may refer to:

- Dietrich, Count of Oldenburg (c. 1398–1440), also known as Theodoric the Lucky
- Leif Erikson (c. 970–c. 1020), Norse explorer also known as Leif the Lucky

== See also ==
- Ojo the Lucky, a character in the Oz book series by L. Frank Baum
- List of people known as the Fortunate
- List of people known as the Unfortunate
