= List of people known as the Blind =

The Blind is an epithet for:

- Béla II of Hungary (c. 1110–1141), King of Hungary and Croatia
- Rudolf II, Count Palatine of the Rhine (1306–1353)
- Bogdan III the One-Eyed (1479–1517), also known as the Blind, Voivode of Moldavia
- Didymus the Blind (c. 313–398), Coptic Church theologian
- Henry IV, Count of Luxembourg (c. 1112–1196), also Count of Namur
- Inal the Great of Circassia (died 1458), supreme prince of Circassia
- Isaac the Blind (c. 1160–1235), Jewish writer and rabbi
- John of Bohemia (1296–1346), Count of Luxembourg, King of Bohemia and titular King of Poland
- Louis the Blind (c. 880–928), King of Provence, King of Italy and briefly Holy Roman Emperor
- Magnus IV of Norway (c. 1115–1139), King of Norway
- Sitric Cáech (died 927), Viking leader who ruled Dublin and then Viking Northumbria
- Theodosius III of Abkhazia, King of the Abkhazians from c. 975 to 978
- Vasily II of Moscow (1415–1462), Grand Prince of Moscow

== See also ==
- List of people known as the One-Eyed
