= List of people known as the Wise =

"The Wise" is an epithet which may refer to:

== People ==
- Ailerán (died 664 or 665), Irish saint and scholar
- Alfonso X of Castile (1221–1284), King of Castile, León and Galicia
- Ari Thorgilsson (1067–1148), Icelandic medieval chronicler
- Banban the Wise (fl. c. mid to late 5th century), Irish saint
- Berengar the Wise (died 835), Count (or Duke) of Toulouse, Duke (or Margrave) of Septimania, and Count of Barcelona
- Cato the Elder (234–149 BC), Roman soldier, senator and historian
- Charles V of France (1338–1380), King of France
- Epiphanius the Wise (died 1420), monk and Eastern Orthodox saint
- Fachtna Fáthach, 2nd-1st century BC high king of Ireland
- Francisco José de Caldas (1768–1816), Colombian lawyer, engineer and geographer
- Frederick III, Elector of Saxony (1463–1525), German nobleman who protected Martin Luther
- Gildas (c. 500–570), British saint and cleric
- John V, Duke of Brittany (1389–1442), also Count of Montfort
- Leo VI the Wise (866–912), Eastern Roman Emperor, Macedonian dynasty
- Louis I of Brzeg (c. 1321–1398), Duke and regent of Legnica, Duke of Brzeg
- Robert, King of Naples (1277–1343), known as a peacemaker and a patron of the arts
- Rognvald Eysteinsson (fl. 9th century), founder of the Earldom of Orkney in the Norse Sagas
- Sancho VI of Navarre (1132–1194), King of Navarre
- Yaroslav the Wise (c. 978–1054), thrice Grand Prince of Novgorod and Kiev

== Mythological characters ==
- Dag the Wise, a mythological Swedish king
- Fintan mac Bóchra, a seer in Irish mythology

== Fictional characters ==
- Alhamazad the Wise, in the Greyhawk series
- Ansem the Wise, in the Kingdom Hearts series
- Darth Plagueis the Wise, in the Star Wars franchise
- The title character of the play Nathan the Wise
- Russano the Wise, from several Redwall novels
- Vasilisa the Wise, the title character in the Russian version of the fairy tale The Frog Princess

== See also ==
- List of people known as the Learned
