= List of people known as the Fat =

"The Fat" is an epithet which may refer to:

- Albert II, Duke of Brunswick (c. 1268–1318)
- Afonso II of Portugal (1185–1223), King of Portugal
- Beslan the Fat (c. 1470–1530s)
- Charles the Fat (839–888), King of Alemannia, King of Italy, western Emperor (as Charles III), King of East Francia and King of West Francia
- Pope Clement IV (1190–1268), known as "Guy le Gros" (French for "Guy the Fat")
- Conan III, Duke of Brittany (c. 1093 to 1096–1148)
- Donough O'Brien, 2nd Earl of Thomond (died 1553)
- Floris II (died 1121), Count of Holland
- Folke the Fat, reportedly the most powerful man in Sweden around 1100
- Frederick of Altmark (c. 1424–1463), Margrave of the Brandenburg and Lord of the Altmark
- Henry I of Cyprus (1217–1253), King of Cyprus
- Henry I of Navarre (c. 1244–1274), King of Navarre and Count of Champagne and Brie (as Henry III)
- Henry V, Duke of Legnica (c. 1248–1296), also Duke of Jawor and Duke of Wroclaw
- Henry, Margrave of Frisia (c. 1055–1101), also Count in Rittigau and Eichsfeld
- Hugh d'Avranches, 1st Earl of Chester (died 1101)
- Humbert II, Count of Savoy (1065–1103)
- James Mor Stewart (c. 1400–1429 or 1449), leader of two rebellions against King James I of Scotland
- John Komnenos the Fat, Byzantine noble who in 1200 attempted to usurp the imperial throne from Alexios III Angelos
- Juan Núñez I de Lara (died 1294), Lord of Lerma, Amaya, Dueñas, Palenzuela, Tordehumos, Torrelobatón and la Mota
- Leopold IV, Duke of Austria (1371–1411), Duke of Further Austria
- Louis VI of France (1081–1137), King of France
- Louis Philippe I, Duke of Orléans (1725–1785), known in French as le gros ("the fat")
- Mieszko II the Fat (c. 1220–1246), Duke of Opole-Racibórz and Duke of Kalisz-Wieluń
- Olaf II of Norway (995–1030), King of Norway
- Peter II of Cyprus (c. 1354 or 1357−1382), King of Cyprus
- Ptolemy VIII Physcon (c. 182 BC–116 BC), Pharaoh of Egypt
- Reginald III, Duke of Guelders (1333–1371)
- Sancho I of León (died 966), King of León
- Welf II, Duke of Bavaria (1072–1120)
- William VI, Duke of Aquitaine (1004–1038)

== See also ==
- List of people known as the Stout
