= List of people known as the Posthumous =

"The Posthumous" is an epithet for:

- Charles of Austria, Bishop of Wroclaw (1590–1624), Prince-Bishop of Wrocław (Breslau), Prince-Bishop of Brixen, Grand Master of the Teutonic Order and ruler of the Bohemian County of Kladsko
- John I of France (born and died in 1316), King of France and Navarre
- Ladislaus the Posthumous (1440–1457), Duke of Austria and King of Hungary, Croatia and Bohemia
- Stephen the Posthumous (1236–1271), son of King Andrew II of Hungary and father of King Andrew III of Hungary
- Theobald I of Navarre (1201–1253), King of Navarre and Count of Champagne
