= List of people known as the Recluse =

"The Recluse" is an epithet applied to:

- Abramios the Recluse (290–360), Christian hermit and ascetic from Edessa
- Herman the Recluse, according to legend, a 13th-century Benedictine monk who wrote the Codex Gigas, also known as the Devil's Bible
- Theophan the Recluse (1815–1894), Russian Orthodox saint, bishop and monk
- Zachariah the Recluse, 4th-century Egyptian Christian monk and ascetic
