= List of people known as the Fair =

The Fair is an epithet that may refer to:

== People ==
- Charles IV of France (1294–1328), King of France and of Navarre, Count of Champagne
- Battus IV of Cyrene (reigned 515-465 BC), Greek King of Cyrene
- Demetrius the Fair (around 285 BC-249 BC or 250 BC), Hellenistic King of Cyrene
- Eadwig (941?–959), King of England
- Edith the Fair (c. 1025–c. 1086), first wife of King Harold II of England
- Ewald the Fair, one of the Two Ewalds, saint and martyr in Old Saxony about 692
- Frederick the Fair (c. 1289–1330), Duke of Austria and Styria as Frederick I, King of Germany (King of the Romans) from 1314 (anti-king until 1325) as Frederick III
- Hasdrubal the Fair (c. 270–221 BC), Carthaginian military leader
- Helena of Hungary, Queen of Croatia (died 1091)
- Helga the Fair, 11th century woman said to have been the most beautiful in Iceland
- Louis I of Brzeg (c. 1321–1398), Duke and regent of Legnica, Duke of Brzeg
- Philip IV of France (1268–1314), King of France
- Philip the Handsome, (1478–1503), King of Castile and Duke of Burgundy
- Radu the Handsome (1435–1475), Voivode (prince) of Wallachia, younger brother of Vlad the Impaler

== In legend and fiction ==
- Elaine of Astolat, in Arthurian legend
- Nimloth the Fair, a tree in J. R. R. Tolkien's fantasy universe

== See also ==
- List of people known as the Beautiful
- List of people known as the Handsome
