= List of people known as the Stammerer =

The Stammerer is an epithet applied to:

- Bohemond III of Antioch (1144–1201), Prince of Antioch
- Louis the Stammerer (846–879), King of Aquitaine and later King of West Francia
- Michael II (770–829), Emperor of the Byzantine Empire
- Notker the Stammerer (c. 840–912), musician, author, poet and Benedictine monk in what is now Switzerland

== See also ==
- Lambert le Bègue (English: "the Stammerer" or "the Stutterer"), 12th century priest and reformer in Liege
- List of stutterers
