= List of people known as the Small =

The Small is an epithet applied to:

- Bolko II the Small (c. 1312–1368), Duke of Świdnica, of Jawor and Lwówek, of Lusatia, over half of Brzeg and Oława, of Siewierz, and over half of Głogów and Ścinawa
- Charles III of Naples (1345–1386), King of Naples, titular King of Jerusalem and King of Hungary
- Dionysius Exiguus (c. 470–c. 544), monk who invented the Anno Domini method of dating
- Nicholas the Small (c. 1327–1358), Duke of Münsterberg

== See also ==
- List of people known as the Little
