= List of people known as the Strict =

The following are known by the epithet the Strict:

- Bolko I the Strict (1252/56-1301), Duke of Lwówek, of Jawor, and of Świdnica-Ziębice
- Otto II, Duke of Brunswick-Lüneburg (c. 1266–1330), also Prince of Lüneburg

== See also ==
- Oda of Canterbury (died 958), Archbishop of Canterbury called the Severe
