= Fearless (tugboat) =

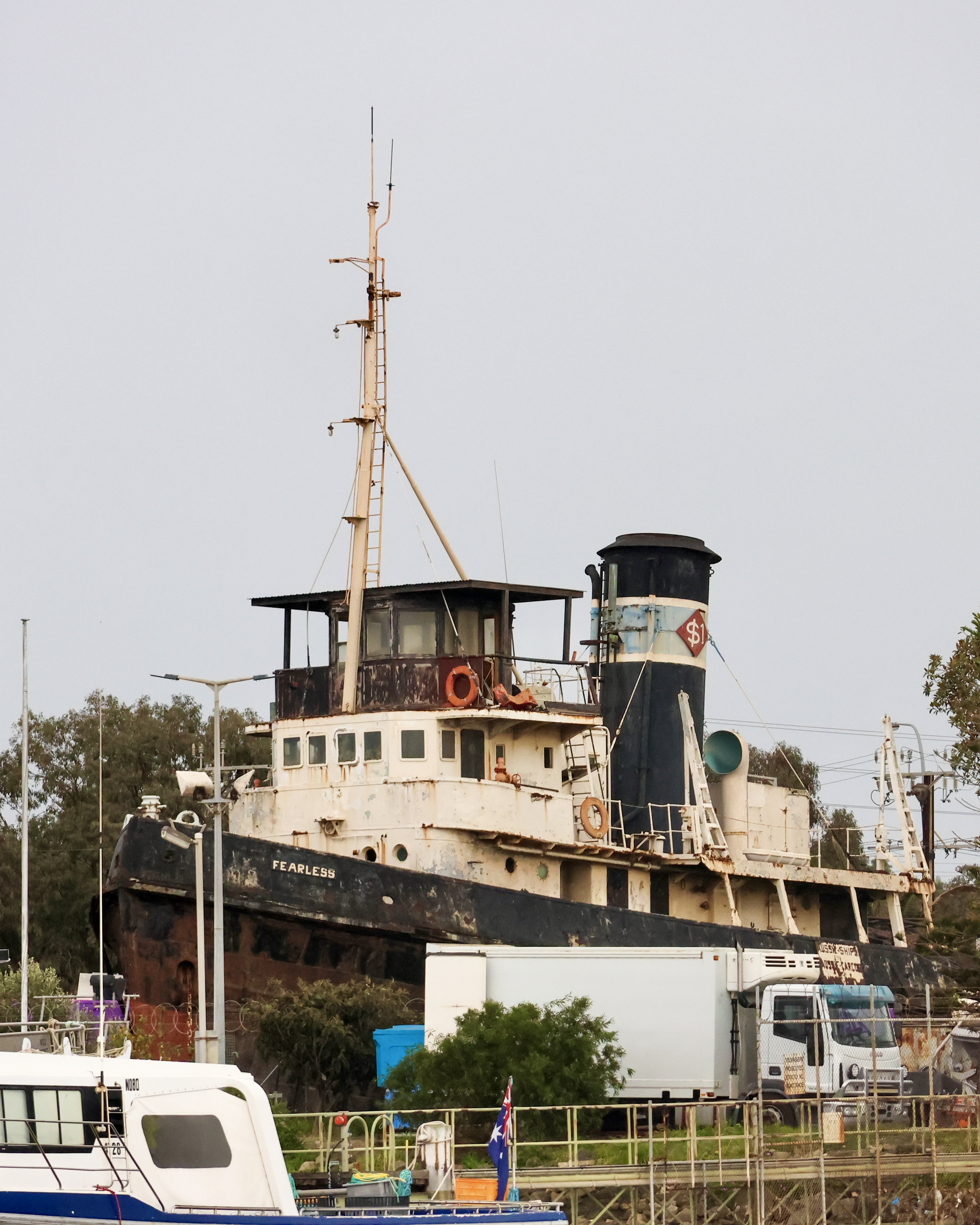
- Fearless beached in 2026

History

Canada
- Name: Rockwing (1945 - 1947)
- Builder: Midlands Shipyards Ltd
- Launched: May 1945

History

Saudi Arabia
- Name: Abqaiq 3
- Owner: Arabian-American Oil Co., Ltd
- In service: 1949
- Out of service: 1954

History

Australia
- Name: Fearless (1954 - current)
- Owner: William & Co. Pty., Ltd.; Queensland Tug Co. Pty. Ltd (1954-1972); K.J. Le Leu (1972); Austbuilt Maritime Museum (1972 - 1973); National Trust of South Australia; History Trust of South Australia; Southern Sea Eagles
- In service: 1954
- Out of service: 1982

General characteristics
- Tonnage: Gross tonnage (GT) of 249
- Length: 113 feet (34 m)
- Beam: 30 feet (9.1 m)
- Depth: 12.42 feet (3.79 m)
- Propulsion: Triple Expansion steam engine cylinders

Fearless is a tugboat that beached at Cruickshank’s Corner in Port Adelaide, South Australia, at 34.84055°S 138.50259°E

It was previously located in Birkenhead, South Australia, Australia.

She was built in Midland, Ontario, Canada in 1945 as the Rockwing, then renamed Tapline 2 (1948–49) and Abqaiq 3 (1949-1954). She received the name Fearless in 1954.

Fearless was put up for sale in 1972 in Brisbane, Australia and bought by Keith LeLeu for $1. He sailed her to Port Adelaide in with a volunteer crew, taking nine days. Four months later LeLeu sold the ship, with other museum materials, to the National Trust of South Australia, again for $1. The collection was subsequently transferred to the History Trust of South Australia with the Fearless being transferred at a later date to a developer called Southern Sea Eagles.

In 2017, Fearless was one of the ships considered in a study funded by Renewal SA about "a strategy for berthing or locating historic ships and vessels within the inner harbour of Port Adelaide."

And the ship was moved to Cruickshank's Corner in Port Adelaide.
