= List of people known as the Rash =

The Rash is an epithet which may refer to:

- Charles the Bold or the Rash (1433–1477), Duke of Burgundy
- James III of Majorca (1315–1349), King of Majorca from 1324 to 1344
- Stephen I, Count of Burgundy (1065–1102)
- William I, Count of Burgundy (1020–1087), father of Stephen I
