= List of people known as the Steadfast =

The epithet the Steadfast may refer to:

- John, Elector of Saxony (1468-1532)
- Selim I (1465/1466/1470-1520), Sultan of the Ottoman Empire
- Húrin, a fictional character in J. R. R. Tolkien's Middle-earth
