= The Black Barons =

Swiss folk-country band

- Origin: Zürich, Switzerland
- Genres: Country, folk
- Years active: 2007–present
- Members: Florian C. Roth; Jessica Wezel; Grady Lee; Pete Borel; Max Kämmerling; Julian Szenogrady; Charlie Weibel
- Past members: Ana Jukic; Mateo Chacon-Pino

The Black Barons is a Swiss country and folk band. The band was founded in 2007 by Florian C. Roth. Two of the band's members, Roth and Jessica Wezel, also perform as a duo called Flo & Jessie.

== Biography ==
=== The Black Barons ===
The band was formed in 2007 by Swiss lawyer Florian C. Roth. They perform country western music and folk music and are based in Zürich. They have headlined at the Trucker & Country Music Festival in Interlaken and at the Gstaader Nachtschicht They have also performed multiple times at the Schützenhaus Albisgütli International Country Music Festival in Zürich, Country Night Gstaad, and the Festival da Jazz St. Mortiz.

The band's sound was influenced by Johnny Cash, Elvis Presley, and the music scene in Nashville.

The band was originally made up of Roth, Mateo Chacon-Pino, Ana Jukic, Max Kämmerling, and Julian Szenogrady. Jukic and Chacon-Pino later left the band. Pete Borel, Grady Lee, and Charlie Weibel later joined the band. In 2018, Jessica Wezel joined the band and began performing with Roth as their own duo, accompanied by the band.

Their debut album, Rolling Skies, was released in 2013.

==== Discography ====
===== Albums =====
- Rolling Skies (2013)
- Rockabilly Classics (2010)

===== Extended plays =====
- Girl in the Night

===== Singles =====
- Girl in the Night
- When You're Young

=== Flo & Jessie ===
Flo & Jessie
- Origin: Zürich, Switzerland
- Genres: country
- Years active: 2018-present
- Members: Florian Roth; Jessica Wezel

Flo & Jessie is a Swiss country music duo composed of Florian Roth and Jessica Wezel. Their debut album, I've Gone My Way, was released on 4 April 2020.

The duo members are Florian Roth, a lawyer, and Jessica Wezel, a medical insurance specialist, both from Zürich. Wezel grew up singing in a gospel choir and later sang as a street performer and club performer in Ireland, where she was taking a language course, going on a pub tour. They met on a country music cruise in the Mediterranean in 2018 and decided to form a country music group together.

They have cited Johnny Cash, Dolly Parton, Emmylou Harris, and Linda Ronstadt as musical influences.

Their debut album, an extended play with six songs titled I've Gone My Way, was released on 4 April 2020. The album was recorded in collaboration with The Black Barons.

=== Discography ===
==== Extended plays ====
- I've Gone My Way (2020)
