= USS Fearless =

USS Fearless may refer to one of the following ships of the United States Navy:

- USS Fearless (SP-724), a tug in commission from 1917 to 1921
- USS Fearless (AMc-80), an Accentor-class coastal minesweeper, later reclassified as a dive tender (YDT-5), commissioned in 1942 and sunk as a target in 1973
- USS Fearless (MSO-442), an Aggressive-class ocean-going minesweeper in commission from 1954 to 1990
