= Rash (surname) =

Rash is a surname. Notable people with the surname include:

- Jim Rash (born 1971), American actor
- Rodney Rash (1959–1996), American horse trainer
- Ron Rash (born 1953), American poet, short story writer, and novelist
- Sean Rash (born 1982), American bowling player
- Steve Rash, American film director
