= Fortunate Thulare =

Motswana footballer

Personal information
- Date of birth: 1 June 1994 (age 32)
- Place of birth: Francistown, Botswana
- Position: Defender

Team information
- Current team: Jwaneng Galaxy

Senior career*
Years	Team	Apps	(Gls)
2016–2018	Miscellaneous		
2018–	Jwaneng Galaxy		

International career^{‡}
2019–	Botswana	6	(0)
- * Club domestic league appearances and goals as of 3 October 2021 ‡ National team caps and goals as of 3 October 2021

Fortunate Thulare (born 1 June 1994) is a Motswana footballer who currently plays as a defender for Jwaneng Galaxy.
