= List of people known as the Beautiful =

The Beautiful is an epithet given to:

== People ==
- John II Komnenos (1087–1143), Byzantine Emperor
- Rahel la Fermosa (c. 1165–1195), Jewish paramour of King Alfonso VIII of Castille

== Fictional or mythological characters ==
- Ara the Beautiful, legendary Armenian hero
- Vasilisa the Beautiful, heroine of a Russian folk tale

== See also ==
- List of people known as the Handsome
- List of people known as the Fair
