= Fearless (Lott novel) =

2007 novel by Tim Lott

- Author: Tim Lott
- Language: English
- Published: Walker Books
- Publication place: United Kingdom
- Media type: Print (Hardback and Paperback)
- Pages: 267
- ISBN: 978-1-4063-0862-4

Fearless is a 2007 young adult science fiction novel by British author Tim Lott. The novel follows the life of Little Fearless as she rebels against the tyrannical "Controller" in the City Community Faith boarding school.

== Reception ==
The Guardian's Josh Lacey referred to Fearless as "a well-written, entertaining and thought-provoking novel".

Lacey found the text reminiscent of both fairy tales and dystopian novels, such as Nineteen Eighty-Four, The Handmaid's Tale, and Blade Runner, among others, and enjoyed various allusions to "the years of Bush and Blair's leadership", as well as "allegorical asides about organised religion, faith schools and the war on terror". Booklist's Lynn Rutan also found similarities to common "fairy-tale tropes", including the importance of the number three, the fact that the "characters are more symbolic than fleshed out; and the language is simple". Rutan noted that "clichés are mixed with some lovely passages, but the symbolism is often heavy handed". Rhona Campbell, writing for School Library Journal, also found the novel to be "carefully contrived to feel like a traditional fairy tale, both in its larger-than-life themes [...] and in its pacing".

Given some of the allusions and allegories, as well as some issues pertaining to the "rather predictable plot twists", Lacey questioned the ideal audience for the novel. Rutan similarly noted that "older teens may need persuading to go past the unappealing cover and the youthful protagonists", but "younger readers may miss [...] the political allusions to the war on terror".

Campbell also mentioned that the "characters are simplistic, not as clever as they are set up to be, not very likable, and far too easily manipulated, as is the ultimate resolution".

== Recognition ==
In 2007, the novel was long-listed for the Guardian Children's Fiction Prize.
