= List of people known as the Drunkard =

The epithet "the Drunkard" may refer to:

- Bekri Mustafa Pasha (died 1690), Grand Vizier of the Ottoman Empire
- Michael III (839 or 840–867), Byzantine emperor
- Selim II (1524–1574), Sultan of the Ottoman Empire
- Wenceslaus IV of Bohemia (1361–1419), King of Bohemia and King of the Romans sometimes called "the Drunkard"
