= List of people known as the Chaste =

The epithet the Chaste may refer to:

- Alfonso II of Aragon (1157–1196), King of Aragon and Count of Barcelona
- Alfonso II of Asturias (759–842), King of Asturias
- Bolesław V the Chaste (1226–1279), Duke of Sandomierz in Lesser Poland and High Duke of Poland
- Fatimah (615–632), called al-Batūl (the Chaste), daughter of Muhammad
- Henry, King of Portugal (1512–1580), also a Catholic cardinal and inquisitor
- Laila bint Lukaiz (died 483), Arab poet
