= Ivan the Terrible (disambiguation) =

Ivan the Terrible (1530–1584), or Ivan IV Vasilyevich, was a ruler of Russia.

Ivan the Terrible may also refer to:

== People with the nickname ==
- Pampero Firpo (Juan Kachmanian, 1930–2020), Argentine wrestler
- Iván Zamorano (born 1967), Chilean footballer
- Ivan Basso (born 1977), Italian cyclist
- Ivan Boesky (born 1937), American insider trader
- Ivan the Terrible (Treblinka guard), a notorious guard at the Nazi German Treblinka extermination camp
- Iván Marino Ospina (1940–1985), Colombian guerilla
- Ivan Serov (1905–1990), Soviet intelligence officer and first chairman of the KGB

== Arts and entertainment ==
- Ivan the Terrible (ballet), choreographed by Yury Grigorovich, 1975
- The Wings of a Serf, also known as Ivan the Terrible, a 1926 Soviet silent historical drama film
- Ivan the Terrible (1917 film), an Italian historical film
- Ivan the Terrible (1945 film), a Soviet epic historical drama
- Ivan the Terrible (Prokofiev), musical score for the 1945 film
- Ivan the Terrible (TV series), 1976 comedy
- Ivan the Terrible (novel), 2007 children's novel by Anne Fine

== Other uses ==
- Ivan the Terrible (polar bear), a polar bear that killed three other polar bears while living in the Griffith Park Zoo
- Ivan IV (disambiguation)
- List of storms named Ivan
