= One Eye Peak =

Mountain in British Columbia, Canada

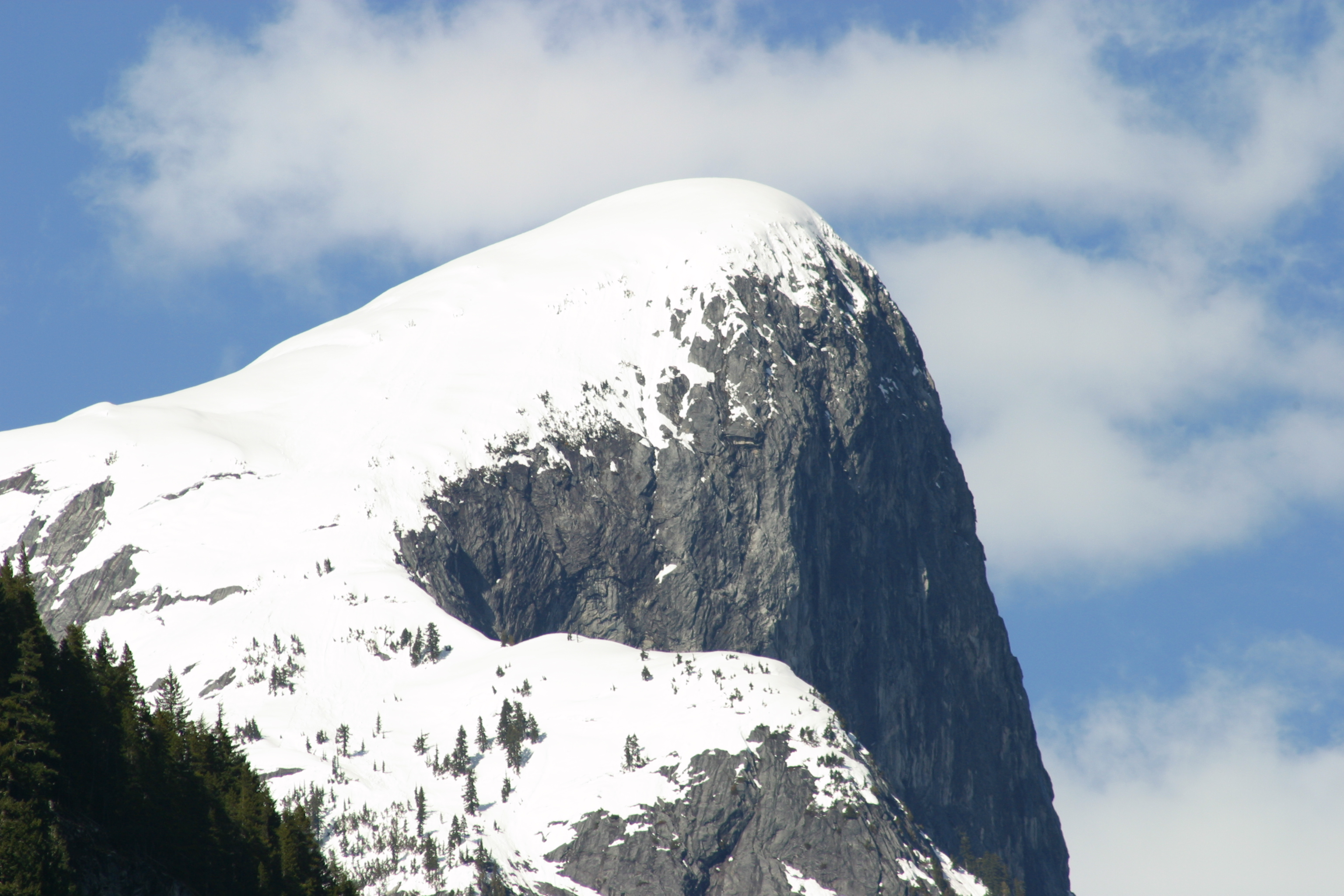
- Old One Eye of Princess Louisa Inlet

Highest point
- Prominence: Princess Louise Inlet, East of Queens Reach, New Westminster Land District
- Coordinates: 50°12′45.00″N 123°49′1.00″W

Geography
- Location within British Columbia
- Interactive map of One Eye Peak
- Location: Princess Louisa Inlet , British Columbia, Canada
- Parent range: Pacific Ranges
- Topo map: NTS 92J4 Princess Louisa Inlet

One Eye Peak is a mountain located at Princess Louisa Inlet. One Eye Peak is part of the Pacific Ranges of the Coast Mountains in southwestern British Columbia, Canada. When Thomas F. Hamilton build his resort called the Malibu Club at the entrance of Princess Louisa Inlet he named the mountain after himself - Mt. Hamilton. The mountain is typically referred to by its English title of a Sechelt First Nation translation "TUHK-OHSS" referring to "Old One Eye" and is the protector of the inlet.

== Gallery ==
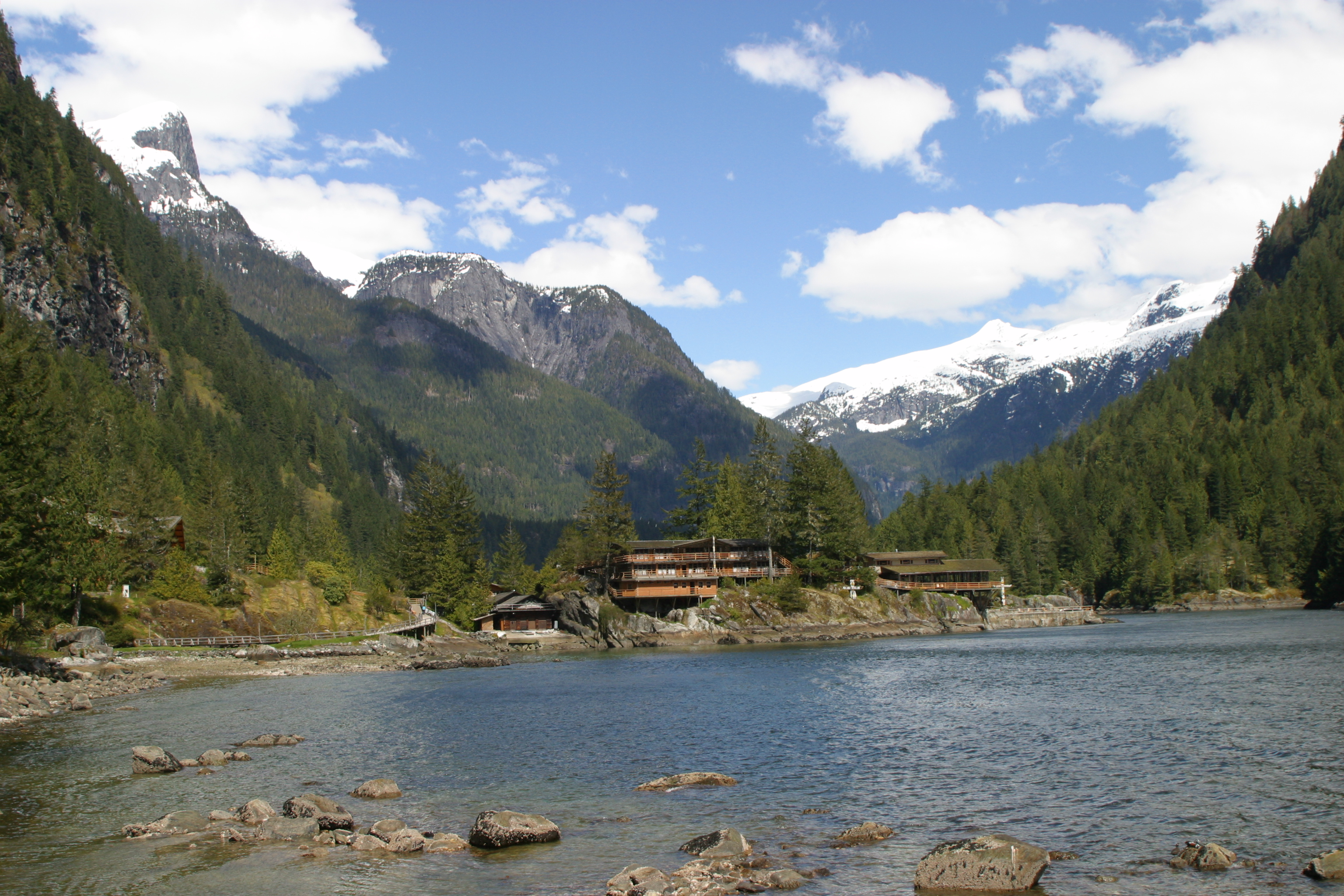
One Eye Peak overlooking the entrance to Princess Louisa Inlet and the Malibu Club.

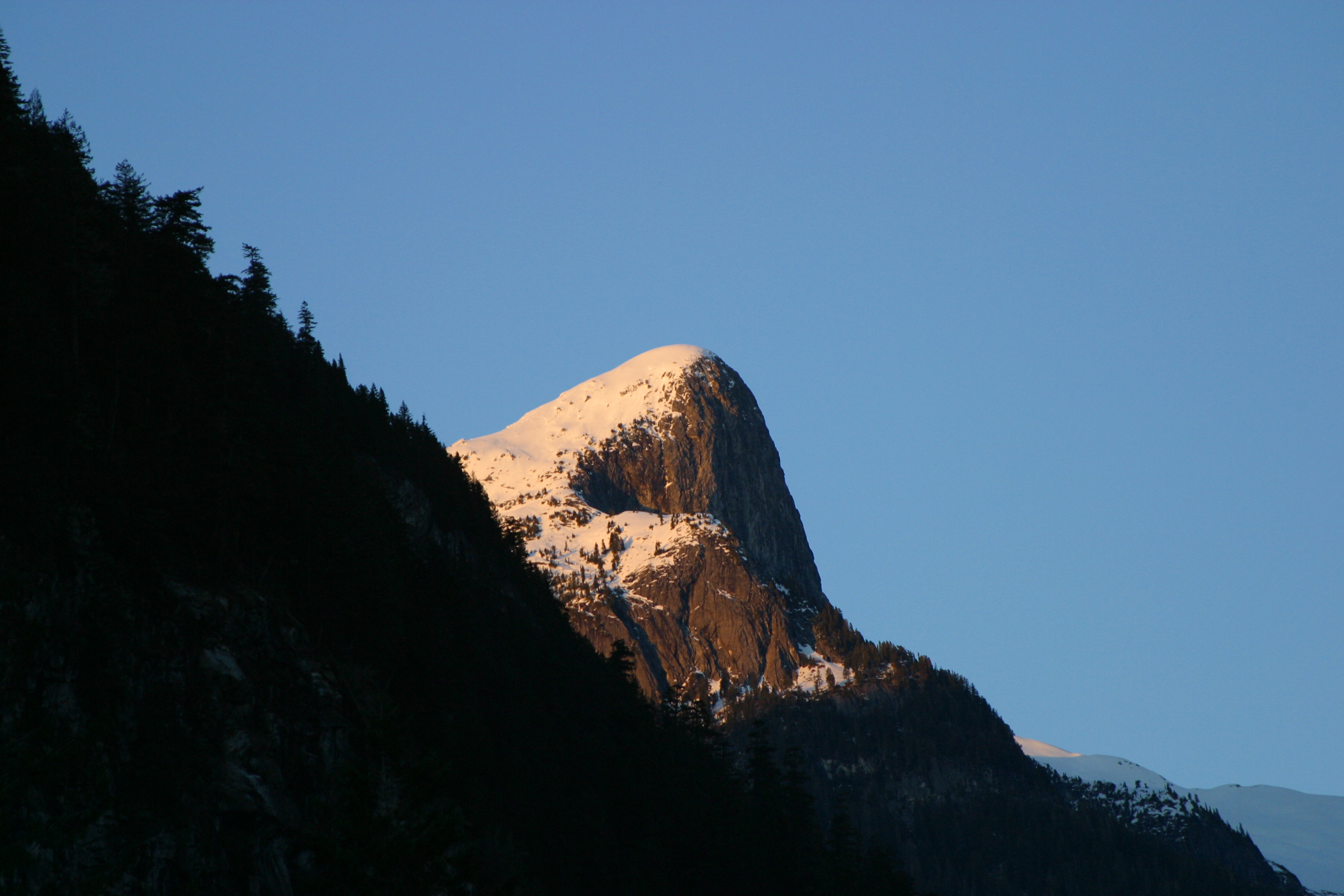
One Eye Peak shining in the Alpine glow of dusk

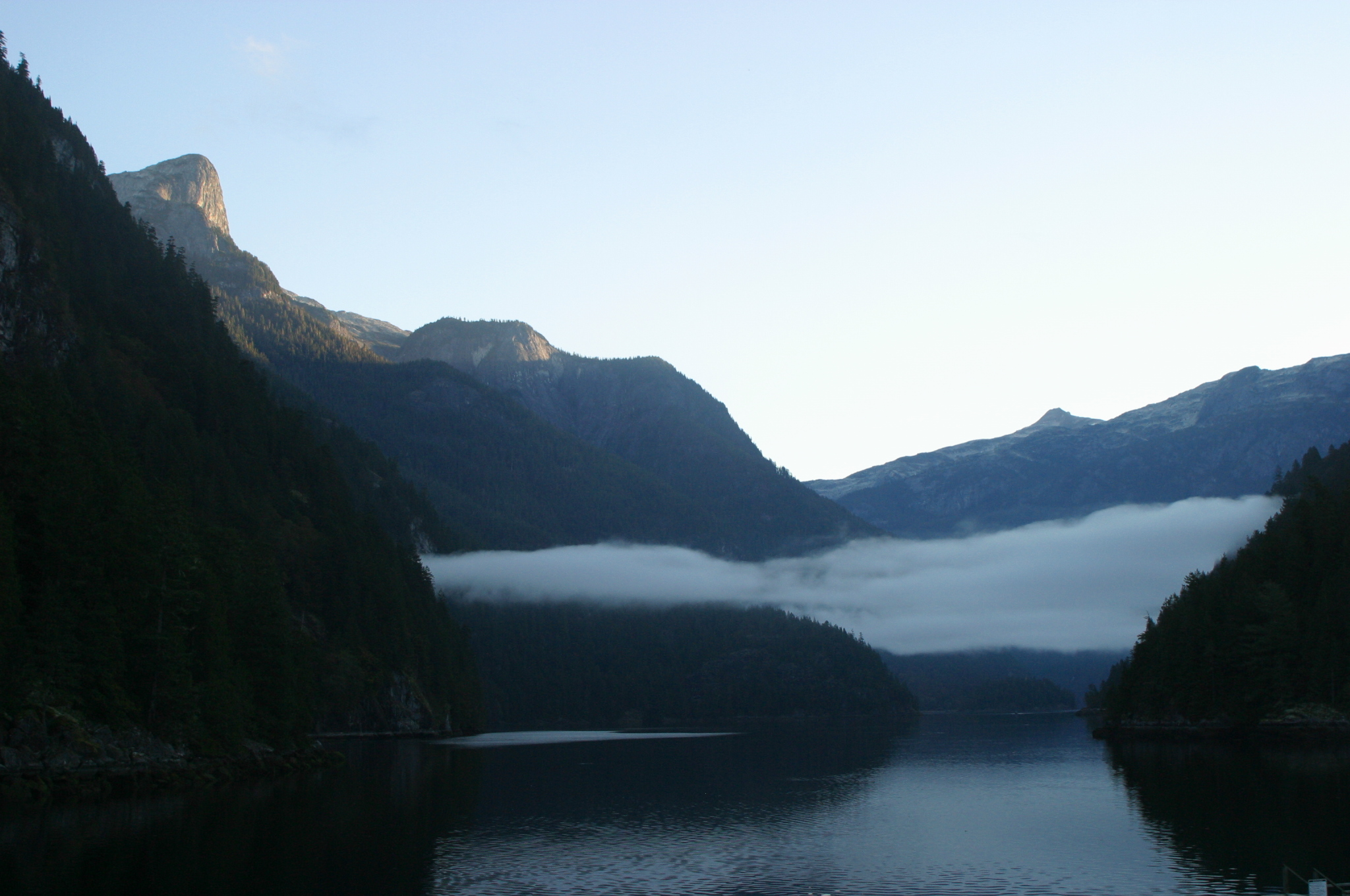
One Eye Peak at dawn

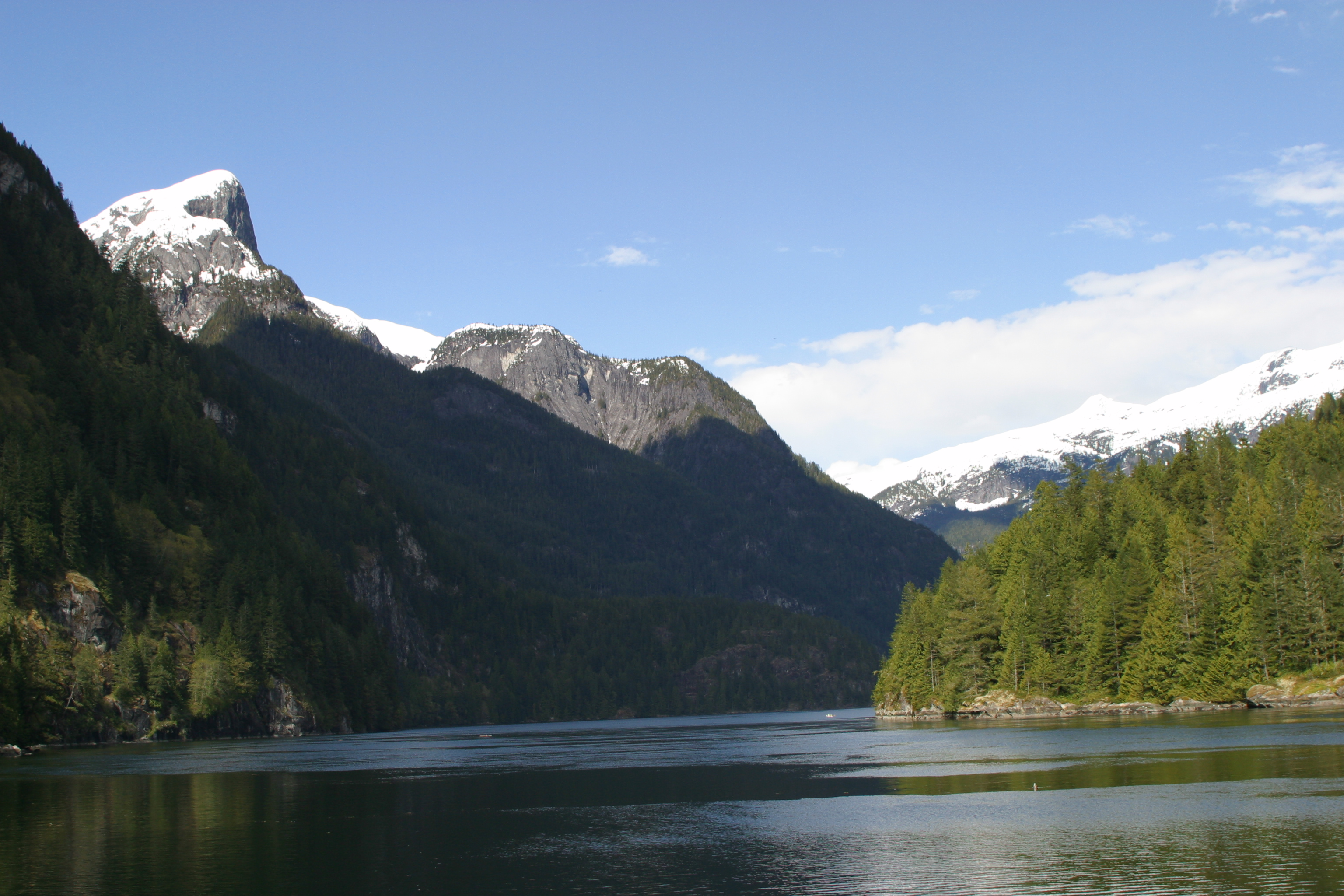
One Eye Peak overlooking Princess Louisa Inlet

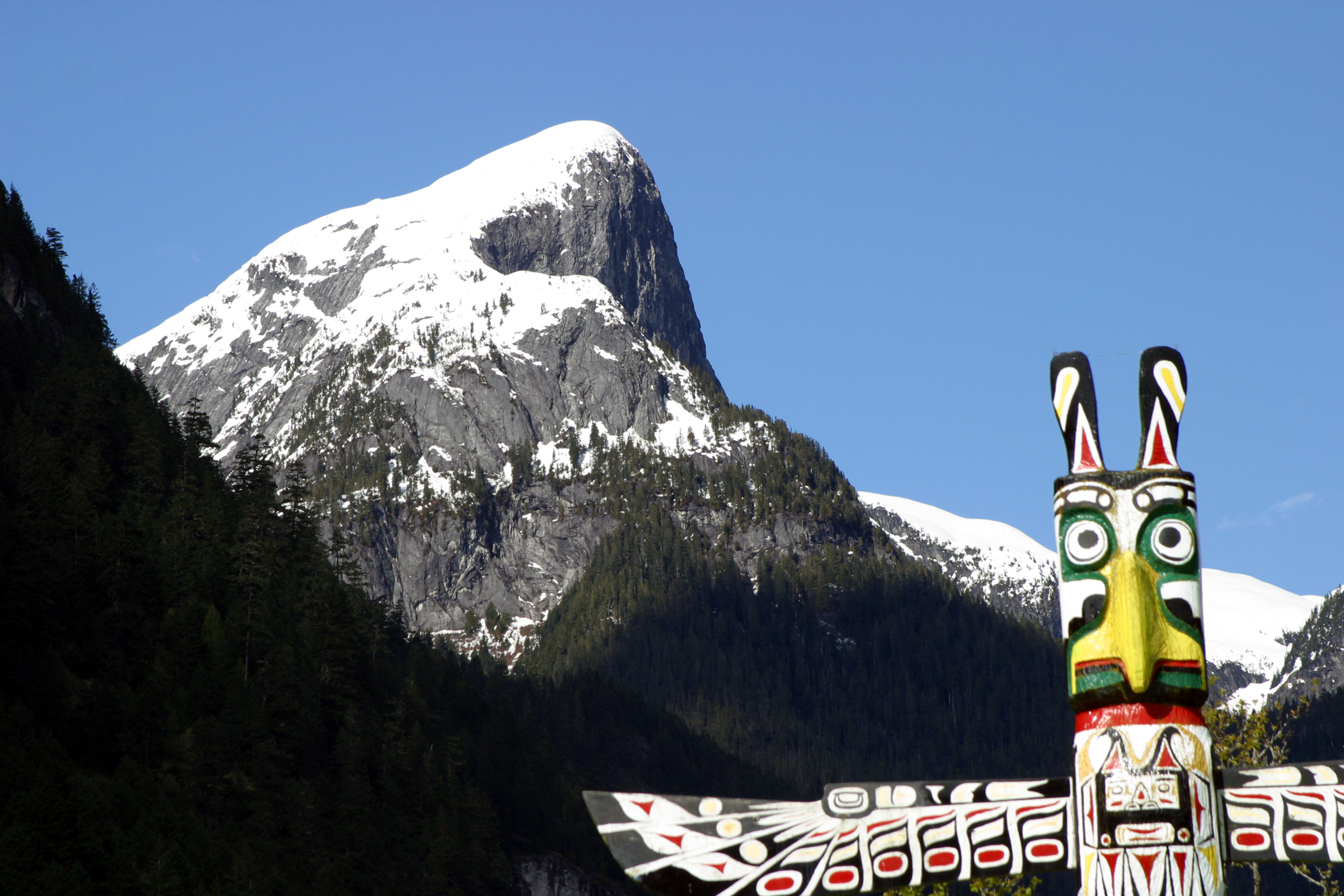
One Eye and the Malibu Totem

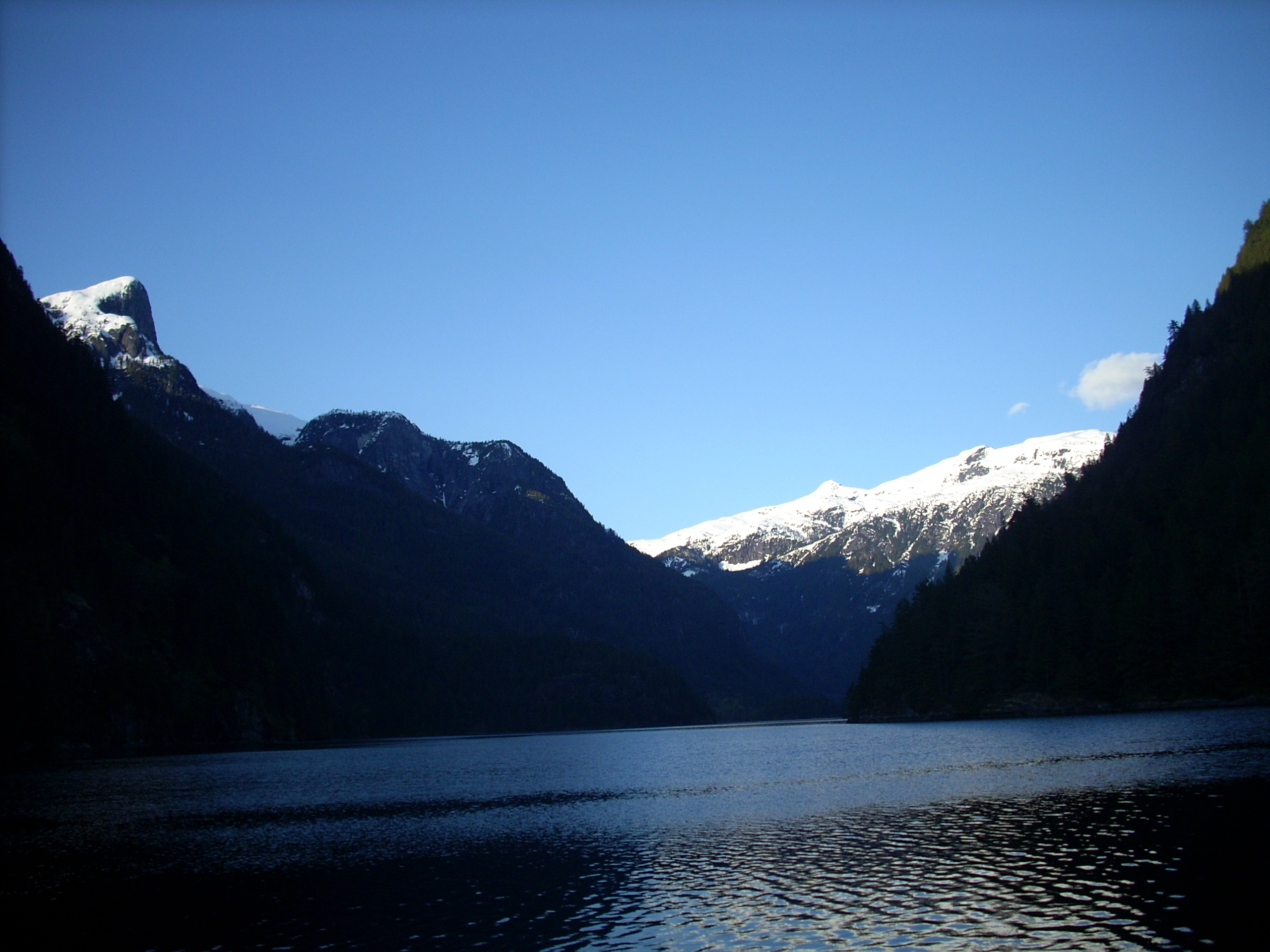
Old One Eye and Sun Peaks the mountains of Princess Louisa Inlet

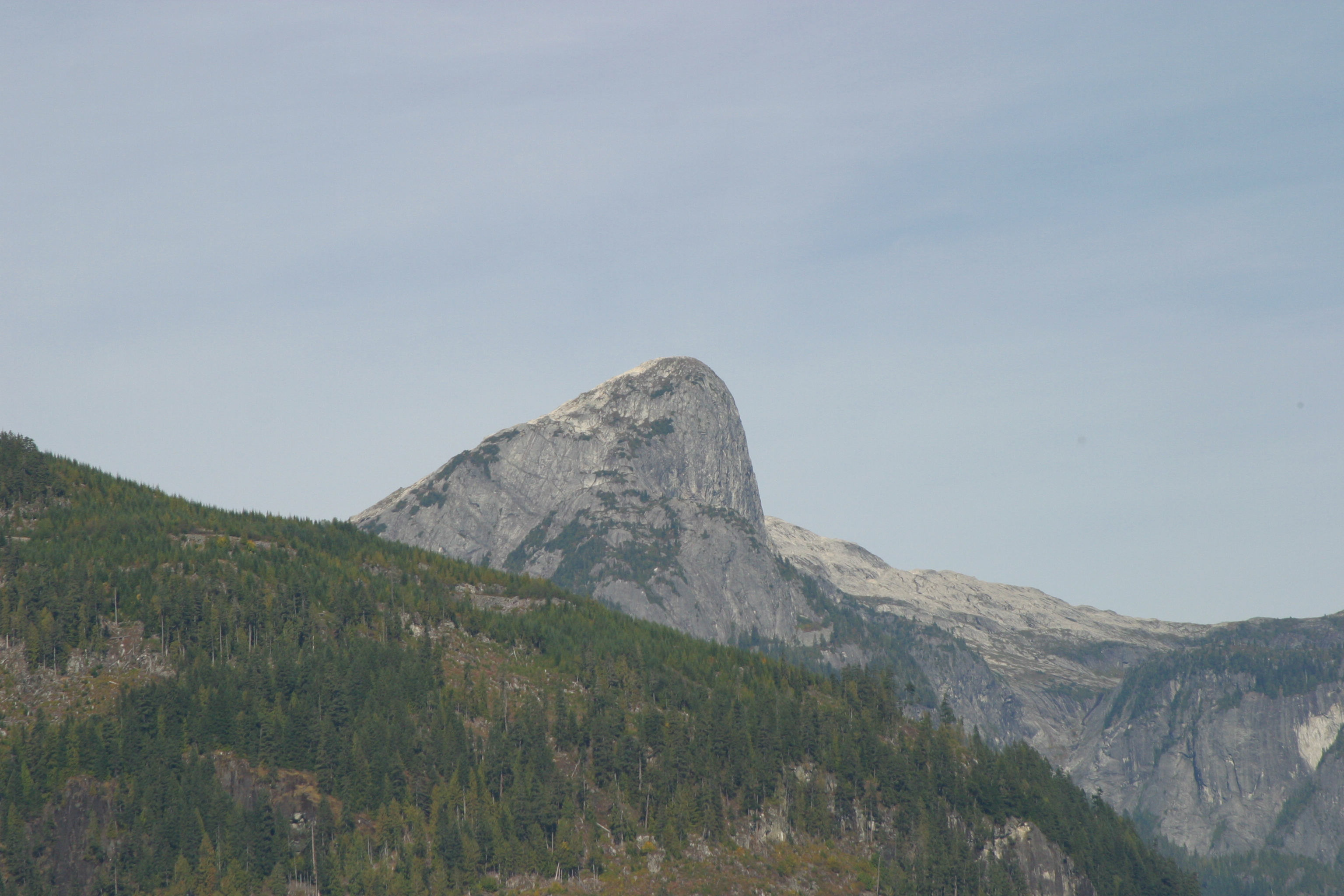
One Eye during the summer of 2006 - down to the bed rock
