= List of people known as the Proud =

The Proud is an epithet which may refer to:

- Henry X, Duke of Bavaria (c. 1108–1139), also Duke of Saxony (as Henry II) and Margrave of Tuscany
- Lucius Tarquinius Superbus (535–496 BC), legendary seventh and final King of Rome
- Shane O'Neill (Irish chieftain) (c. 1530–1567), an Irish chieftain of the O'Neill dynasty of Ulster
- Simeon of Moscow (1316-1353), Prince of Moscow and Grand Prince of Vladimir
- Tovi the Proud, a rich and powerful 11th-century Danish thegn with estates in southern England

== See also ==
- Charles Seymour, 6th Duke of Somerset (1662-1748), the "Proud Duke"
