= Abraham the Monk =

Abraham the Monk was a monk who lived in a monastery on Mount Sinai in the Sinai desert. He was born about the close of the sixth century, and became a convert to Judaism about 615. As a Christian monk, he spent his life in penance and prayer. Doubts as to the Christian dogma grew in his mind, and, after a prolonged struggle, he deserted his cell in the monastery on Mount Sinai and wandered North through the desert into the Land of Israel, finally reaching the city of Tiberias. Here he submitted to circumcision and became a Jew, receiving the name Abraham, by which he was subsequently known.
