= Fearless (Keri Noble album) =

Studio album by Keri Noble
- Released: March 9, 2004
- Genre: Singer-songwriter, Pop, Piano Pop
- Length: 44:50
- Label: Manhattan
- Producer: Rob Arthur, Jeff Arundel

Keri Noble chronology
Fearless (2004)	Let Go (2007)

Professional ratings
Review scores
Source	Rating
AllMusic	4/5 stars

Fearless is the debut album of American singer-songwriter Keri Noble. It was released under Manhattan Records on March 9, 2004.

== Critical reception ==
Alex Henderson of AllMusic concludes his review with, "Fearless is not an album that goes out of its way to push the smile button; at times, Noble's observations can be dark and melancholy. But if Fearless is less than optimistic on the whole, it is also impressively honest and sincere – emotionally, Noble really lays it on the line, and she shows a great deal of promise on this superb debut."

Steve Morse of The Boston Globe has this to say about Fearless. "Rarely will you hear an artist go from tender apology (as in "A Dream About You," in which Noble takes the blame for fumbling a relationship) to no-nonsense anger (as in "I Won't," which, she said, some people have called her "Alanis Morissette song"). It added up to a profound emotional ride – and here's some further news: Noble's album is even better, because it has a band behind her and some string arrangements tastefully done by Mardin. Right now, Noble is being marketed as a "hot adult-contemporary" artist, whatever that means, but if you like piano ballads from the heart and don't care about labels, then she's worth discovering."

== Track listing ==
All tracks are written by Keri Noble, unless otherwise noted.

No.	Title	Writer(s)	Length
1.	"Look at Me"		4:04
2.	"Talk To Me"		3:23
3.	"Piece of My Heart"	Keri Noble; Jeff Arundel	3:45
4.	"A Dream About You"		3:54
5.	"About Me"		3:24
6.	"Let It Rain"	Keri Noble; Jeff Arundel	3:53
7.	"Falling"		2:58
8.	"Love Is All I Know"	Keri Noble; Jeff Arundel	4:30
9.	"Answered Prayer"		3:01
10.	"Bartender"		4:03
11.	"I Won't"	Keri Noble; Jeff Arundel	3:46
12.	"If No One Will Listen"		4:09
Total length:			44:50

== Musicians ==
- Keri Noble: Piano, Main Vocal
- Jeff Arundel: Six- and Twelve-String Electric Guitars, Gut String Guitar, Backing Vocals, Loops (tracks 2, 4, 8 and 11)
- Rob Arthur: Keyboards, Accordion, Backing Vocals, Bass Guitar (track 3), Loops (tracks 2, 4 and 8), Drum Programming (track 5)
- Jeff Bailey: Bass Guitar
- Kathleen Johnson: Vocal Backing
- Rich Mercurio: Drums, Percussion, Loops (track 11)

== Additional Musicians ==
- John Conte: Bass Guitar (track 9 and 10)
- Ann Klein: Lap Steel Guitar (track 3 and 5), Mandolin (track 10)
- John Herchert: Electric Guitar (track 8)
- Jeff Victor: Organ (track 1)
- Kathleen Johnson: Backing Vocals (track 6)
- Jonathan Dinklage: Violin (track 3)
- Dirk Freymuth: Electric Guitar (track 11)
- String section (tracks 2, 6 and 12)
  - Jonathan Dinklage: Violin
  - Antoine Silverman: Violin
  - Chris Cardona: Viola
  - Anja Wood: Cello
  - Wolfgang: Cello

The song "If No One Will Listen" was re-recorded for Kelly Clarkson's 2009 album All I Ever Wanted, which Clarkson received a production credit for. It is the last track on both Noble's and Clarkson's respective albums.

Track information and credits verified from the album's liner notes. Some information was adapted from Discogs and AllMusic.
