= List of people known as the One-Eyed =

The One-Eyed is an epithet of:

- Horatius Cocles (fl. late 6th century BC), Roman officer famed for defending a bridge against an army
- Antigonus I Monophthalmus (382–301 BC), Macedonian nobleman, general, satrap and king, founder of the Antigonid dynasty
- John the One-Eyed, a secular priest murdered in 1233
- Sitric Cáech (died 927), Viking ruler of Dublin and Viking Northumbria
- Egbert the One-Eyed (died 994), German count
- Raymond IV, Count of Toulouse or Monoculus (c. 1041–1105), count of Toulouse
- John fitzRichard the One-Eyed or Monoculus (fl. 1076), Norman nobleman
- Reginald I, Count of Bar (c. 1080–1149)
- Frederick II, Duke of Swabia (1090–1147)
- Peter Monoculus (d. 29 October 1185), Cistercian abbot
- Otto II, Duke of Brunswick-Göttingen (c. 1380–1463)
- Bogdan III the One-Eyed (1479–1517), Voivode of Moldavia

== See also ==
- Xiahou Dun (died 220), Chinese general and politician known as "One-Eyed Xiahou"
- Iain "One-eye" Camm (fl. bef. 1390), second chief of Clan Gregor
- Jan Žižka (d. 1424), Czech military leader known as "One-eyed Žižka"
- Date Masamune (1567–1636), Japanese daimyo (ruler) known as the "One-Eyed Dragon of Ōshu"
- Charley Parkhurst (1812–1879), American stagecoach driver also known as "One-Eyed Charlie"
- List of one-eyed creatures in mythology and fiction
- List of people known as the Blind
