= List of people known as the Prudent =

The Prudent is an epithet applied to:

- Louis XI (1423-1483), King of France
- Philip II of Spain (1527-1598), King of Spain
- Sancho VII of Navarre (1154-1234), King of Navarre
