= List of people known as the Gentle =

"The Gentle" is an epithet and a nickname which may refer to:

- Alfonso IV of Aragon (1299–1336), King of Aragon and Count of Barcelona
- Frederick II, Elector of Saxony (1412–1464), also Landgrave of Thuringia
- Mensur Suljović (born 1972), Serbian-born Austrian darts player nicknamed "The Gentle"
- Queen Susan the Gentle, a fictional character in C. S. Lewis's The Chronicles of Narnia series

== See also ==
- Angelo Bruno (1910–1980), Sicilian-American crime boss also known as "the Gentle Don"
- Donald Cameron of Lochiel (c. 1695 or 1700–1748), known as "Gentle Lochiel", hereditary chief of Clan Cameron and supporter of Bonnie Prince Charlie
