= Milk Queen =

Title awarded by dairy associations

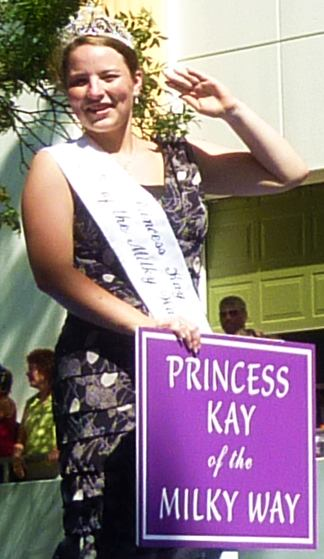
Princess Kay of the Milky Way (Katie Miron, 2010)

Milk Queen (often called Dairy Princess or Milk Princess) is the title awarded to the winner of regularly-organized competitions by Dairy Associations in many countries.

== Idea ==
The Milk Queen, from a marketing point of view, is a brand or product testimonial. Similar to Apple-, Asparagus-, Beer-, Corn-, Must-, Potato- or Wine Queens she promotes a certain food group. Normally elected for a region, she represents dairy products from this region. The purpose of the Milk Queen is to inform the public of the many benefits of consuming dairy products on a daily basis. Promotion activities may include appearances at trade shows or consumer events, primary schools and press conferences.

As a condition, it is expected that Milk Queen candidates will be charming with strong self-esteem, and a basic knowledge about dairy production. Remuneration or financial award is not usually granted to the Queen, but expenses for business traveling and clothing are reimbursed. Some organizers give out prizes to winners, like travels.

== United States ==
Norma Garrett of Harvard was elected the 1st Harvard Milk Day Queen in 1945. In most other U.S. states elected representatives are called Dairy Princess. They normally are elected from all related County Dairy Princesses, as e.g. the 1954 established Princess Kay of the Milky Way is the winner of the statewide Minnesota Dairy Princess Program with around 100 participants. Other State Dairy Princesses are the Indiana Dairy Princess, the Maryland Dairy Princess, the New York Dairy Princess, the North Dakota Dairy Princess, the Pennsylvania State Dairy Princess, the Nebraska State Dairy Princess (reigning Princess Marta Pulfer), or the Virginia Dairy Princess.

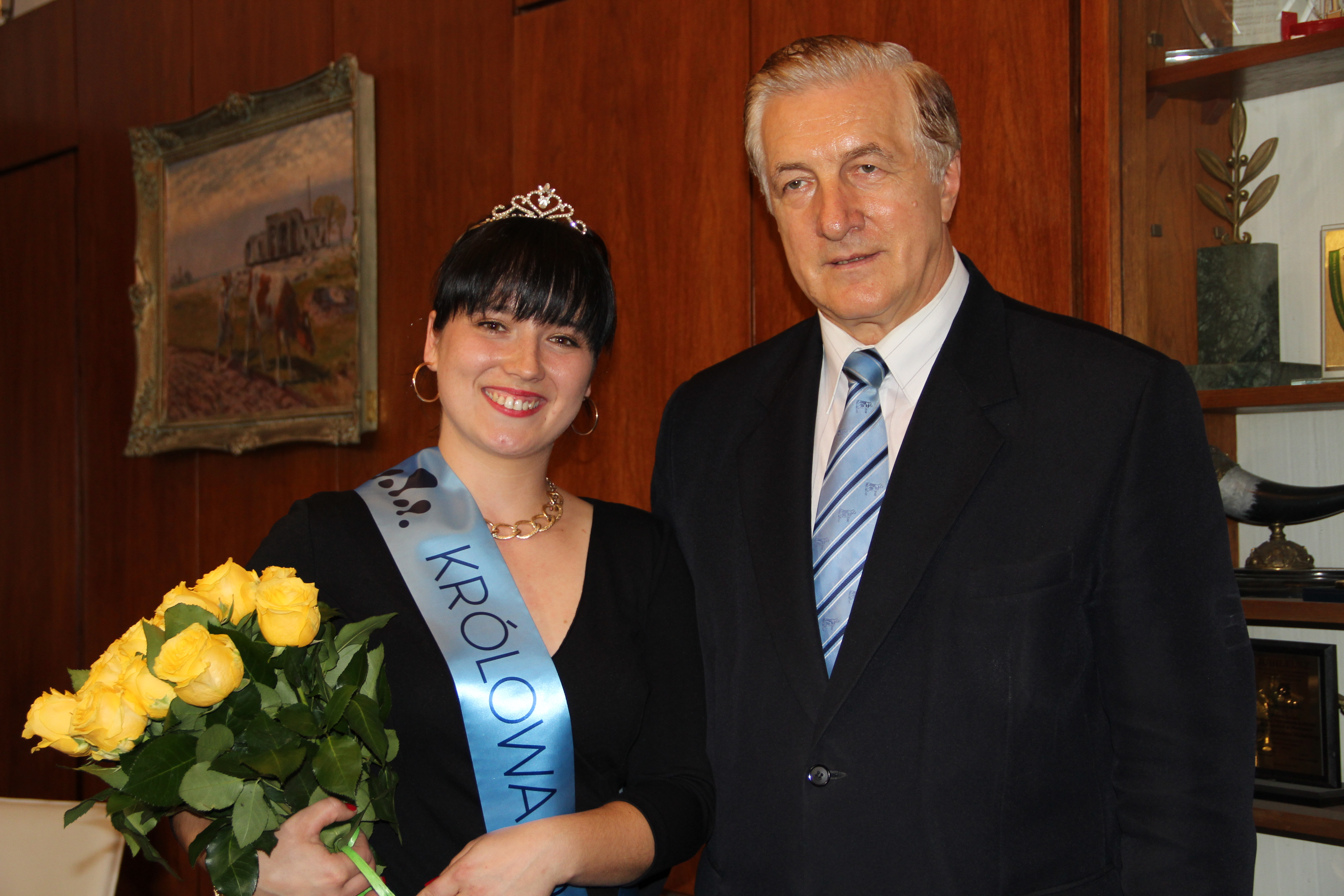
The Polish Milk Queen for 2014, Katarzyna Gajownik and Waldemar Broś, Chairman of the Polish Federation of Dairy Cooperatives (KZSM ZR)

- Wisconsin's Dairy Queen and Alice in Dairyland

== Europe ==
In Germany and Austria several Milk Queens (Milchkönigin) are elected by state dairy associations. Since 1985 the Bavarian Dairy Industry (Landesvereinigung der Bayerischen Milchwirtschaft) elects bi-yearly a Queen and a Princess. State Associations in Brandenburg, Hesse, Rhineland-Palatinate, Saxony and Thuringia elect Milk Queens too.

Lower Austria's Katrin I. is the newest Milk Queen in German-speaking countries. She was elected in 2012. In Poland in 2013 the election of a Polish Milk Queen (Polska Królowa Mleka) was initiated for the first time.

== South America ==
In Argentina at several events a Queen of Milk (La Reina de la Leche) gets elected. Different than in other countries, this election is a beauty contest only.
