= Epithet =

Descriptive term used in place of a formal name

An epithet (from Ancient Greek ἐπίθετον (epítheton) 'adjective', from ἐπίθετος (epíthetos) 'additional'), also a byname, is a descriptive term (word or phrase) commonly accompanying or occurring in place of the name of a real or fictitious person, place, or thing. It is usually literally descriptive, as in Alexander the Great, Suleiman the Magnificent and Richard the Lionheart, or allusive, as in Edward the Confessor, William the Conqueror, Æthelred the Unready, Mehmed the Conqueror, and Bloody Mary.

The word epithet also may refer to an abusive, defamatory, or derogatory word or phrase. This use is criticized by Martin Manser and other proponents of linguistic prescription. H. W. Fowler noted in 1926 that "epithet is suffering a vulgarization that is giving it an abusive imputation".

== Linguistics ==
Epithets are sometimes attached to a person's name or appear in place of their name, as what might be described as a glorified nickname or sobriquet, and for this reason, some linguists have argued that they should be considered as pronouns. It has also been argued that epithets are a phenomenon with the syntax–semantics interface, because they have components of both, and also a pragmatic dimension.

An epithet is linked to its noun by long-established usage. Not every adjective is an epithet. An epithet is especially recognizable when its function is largely decorative, such as when "cloud-gathering Zeus" is employed other than in reference to conjuring up a storm. "The epithets are decorative insofar as they are neither essential to the immediate context nor modeled especially for it. Among other things, they are extremely helpful to fill out a half-verse", Walter Burkert has noted.

Some epithets are known by the Latin term epitheton necessarium, as they are required to distinguish the bearers, as an alternative to numbers after a prince's name—such as Richard the Lionheart (Richard I of England), or Charles the Fat alongside Charles the Bald. The same epithet can be used repeatedly, joined to different names, such as Alexander the Great, as well as Constantine the Great.

Other epithets can easily be omitted without serious risk of confusion and are therefore known as epitheton ornans. Thus, the classical Roman author Virgil systematically called his main hero pius Aeneas, the epithet being pius, meaning religiously observant, humble and wholesome, as well as calling the armsbearer of Aeneas fidus Achates, the epithet being fidus, which means faithful or loyal.

== Literature ==
Epithets are characteristic of the style of ancient epic poetry, notably in that of Homer or the northern European sagas (see above, as well as epithets in Homer). When James Joyce uses the phrase "the snot-green sea", he is playing Homer's familiar epithet "the wine-dark sea". The phrase "Discreet Telemachus" is also considered an epithet.

The Greek term antonomasia, in rhetoric, means substituting any epithet or phrase for a proper name, as "Pelides", signifying the "son of Peleus", to identify Achilles. An opposite substitution of a proper name for some generic term is also sometimes called antonomasia, as Cicero for an orator. The use of a father's name or an ancestor's name, such as "Pelides" in the case of Achilles, or "Saturnia" in the case of the goddess Juno in Virgil's Aeneid, is specifically called a patronymic device and is in its own class of epithet.

Epithets were, in layman's terms, glorified nicknames that could be used to represent one's style, artistic nature, or even geographical reference. They originated to simply serve the purpose of dealing with names that were hard to pronounce or just unpleasant. It went from there to something that could be very significant, assigned by elders or counterparts to represent one's position in the community, or it could be a representation of whomever one wanted to be or thought he was. The elegance of this movement was used throughout history and even modern day, with many examples ranging from "Aphrodite the Heavenly & Zeus the Protector of Guests" all the way to "Johnny Football & King James".

American comic books tend to give epithets to superheroes, such as The Phantom being "The Ghost Who Walks", Superman being called "The Man of Steel", and "The Dynamic Duo" Batman and Robin, who are individually known as "The Dark Knight" and "The Boy Wonder".

Additionally, epíteto, the Spanish version of epithet, is commonly used throughout poems in Castilian literature.

== Religion ==
In many polytheistic religions, such as those of ancient India and Iran (the most ancient of which go back to a common Indo-Iranian period), Greece and Rome, a deity's epithets generally reflected a particular aspect of that god's essence and role, for which their influence may be obtained for a specific occasion: Apollo Musagetes is "Apollo, [as] leader of the Muses" and therefore patron of the arts and sciences, while Phoibos Apollo is the same deity, but as shining sun-god. "Athena protects the city as polias, oversees handicrafts as ergane, joins battle as promachos and grants victory as nike."

Alternatively, the epithet may identify a particular and localized aspect of the god, such as a reference to the mythological place of birth or numinous presence at a specific sanctuary: sacrifice might be offered on one and the same occasion to Pythian Apollo (Apollo Pythios) and Delphic Apollo (Apollo Delphinios). A localizing epithet refers simply to a particular center of veneration and the cultic tradition there, as the god manifested at a particular festival, for example: Zeus Olympios, Zeus as present at Olympia, or Apollo Karneios, Apollo at the Spartan Carneian festival.

Often, the epithet is the result of the fusion of the Olympian divinity with an older one. Poseidon Erechtheus and Artemis Orthia reflect intercultural equations of a divinity with an older one that is generally considered its pendant. Thus, most Roman gods and goddesses, especially the Twelve Olympians, had traditional counterparts in Greek, Etruscan, and most other Mediterranean pantheons, such as Jupiter as head of the Olympian Gods with Zeus. But in specific cults, there may be a different equation, based on one specific aspect of the divinity. Thus, the Greek word Trismegistos ("thrice grand") was first used as a Greek name for the Egyptian god of science and invention, Thoth, later as an epitheton for the Greek Hermes and, finally, the fully equated Roman Mercurius Mercury (both were messengers of the gods). Among the Greeks, T.H. Price notes that the nurturing power of Kourotrophos might be invoked in sacrifices and recorded in an inscription, without specifically identifying Hera or Demeter.

Some epithets were applied to several deities of the same pantheon rather accidentally if they had a common characteristic, or deliberately, emphasizing their blood or other ties. Thus, in pagan Rome, several divine gods and heroes were given the epitheton Comes as a companion of another (usually major) divinity. An epithet can even be meant for collective use, e.g., in Latin pilleati, "the felt hat-wearers" for the brothers Castor and Pollux. Some epithets resist explanation.

Catholics, Eastern Orthodox Christians, and Christians of other churches practice the use of epithets in the veneration of Jesus (e.g., "Christ"; "Prince of Peace"; "The Good Shepherd"), of Mary, Mother of Jesus (e.g., "Mother of God"; "Panagia"), and of the saints (e.g., "Pope Saint John Paul the Great, Saint Theophan the Recluse"). "Our Lady of Lourdes" is essentially periphrasis, except where some aspect of the Virgin is invoked.

== Rhetoric ==
An epithet is an adjective or adjectival phrase that characterizes a place, a thing, or a person, that helps make the characteristics of this thing more prominent. These descriptive phrases can be used in a positive or negative way that benefits the orator. "It will generally happen, that the Epithets employed by a skillful orator, will be found to be, in fact, so many abridged arguments, the force of which is sufficiently conveyed by a mere hint; e.g., if any one says, 'We ought to take warning from the bloody revolution of France,' the Epithet suggests one of the reasons for our being warned; and that, not less clearly, and more forcibly, than if the argument had been stated at length." With persuasion being a key component of rhetoric, it is rational to use epithets. The use of persuasive wording gives leverage to one's arguments. Knowledge, along with descriptive words or phrases can be a powerful tool. This is supported in Bryan Short's article when he states, "The New Rhetoric derives its empiricist flavor from a pervasive respect for clarity and directness of language." Rhetoricians use epithets to direct their audience to see their point of view, using verbal forms of imagery as a persuasive tactic.

Orators have a variety of epithets that they can employ that have different meanings. The most common are fixed epithets and transferred epithets. A fixed epithet is the repetitive use of the same word or phrase for the same person or object. A transferred epithet qualifies a noun other than the person or thing it is describing. This is also known as a hypallage. This can often involve shifting a modifier from the animate to the inanimate; for example, "cheerful money" and "suicidal sky".

Orators take special care when using epithets so as to not use them as smear words. Orators could be accused of racial or abusive epithets if used incorrectly. American journalist William Safire discussed the use of the word in a 2008 column in The New York Times: "'I am working on a piece about nationalism with a focus on epithet as a smear word,' writes David Binder, my longtime Times colleague, 'which was still a synonym for 'delineation' or 'characterization' in my big 1942 Webster's but now seems to be almost exclusively a synonym for 'derogation' or 'smear word.' ... In the past century, [epithet] blossomed as 'a word of abuse,' today gleefully seized upon to describe political smears."

== Usage prior to surnames ==
Descriptive bynames were given to a person to distinguish them from other people of the same name. In England, bynames were used during the period when the use of surnames had not been extensively adopted. As an example, the Domesday Book of 1086 identifies 40 individuals with the given name of "Richard". A plurality (40%), such as "Richard of Coursey" are identified with a locational byname, indicating where they came from, or in some cases where they lived. Others (25%), such as "Richard the butler" and "Richard the bald" are identified with an occupational or a personally descriptive byname. Some of the individuals, such as Richard Basset, made use of what would now be recognized as a surname.

The distinction between a byname and a surname is that the byname is not usually heritable, and may change for any given person as his circumstances change. Richard the Bald, for example, was presumably not always bald, and Richard of Brampton may not have always lived at Brampton.

The use of bynames did not end with the adoption of surnames. In some cases, before the adoption of middle names, government records, such as taxes lists, included people with both the same given name and the same surname. This led to the use of bynames to further distinguish the person. For example, one "John Smith" might be described as "John Smith of the mill", while another might be described as "John Smith the short".

== See also ==
- Animal epithet
- Bahuvrihi, a Proto-Indo-European formation often used for epithets
- Cognomen
- Honorific
- List of monarchs by nickname
- Lists of people by epithet
- Makurakotoba
- Nickname
- Plant epithet
- Sobriquet
- Synecdoche
- Toponymic surname, a surname derived from a place name
