= Thomas Good (merchant) =

19th century businessman in Adelaide, Australia

Thomas Good was a merchant of Adelaide, South Australia, a founder of the wholesale drapery business of Good, Toms & Co.

== History ==
Thomas Good (c. 1822 – 21 January 1889) of Birmingham left England for South Australia in the John Mitchell with (later Sir) Charles Goode ( – 5 February 1922), arriving in Adelaide in April 1849. Together they travelled the State by horse and cart hawking softgoods (soft goods being cloth and articles made from it), and were successful enough to start a small drapery business in Kermode Street, North Adelaide. They each married a sister of the other.

In 1850 John Good & Co. began trading as drapers in Rundle Street, Adelaide, opposite Berry's China Warehouse.

In January 1853 he opened a general store opposite Low's Inn, Mount Barker, followed by a grain store which in 1864 he sold to William Barker, previously a partner of Sidney George Wilcox's brothers Joseph and Emery in Gawler.

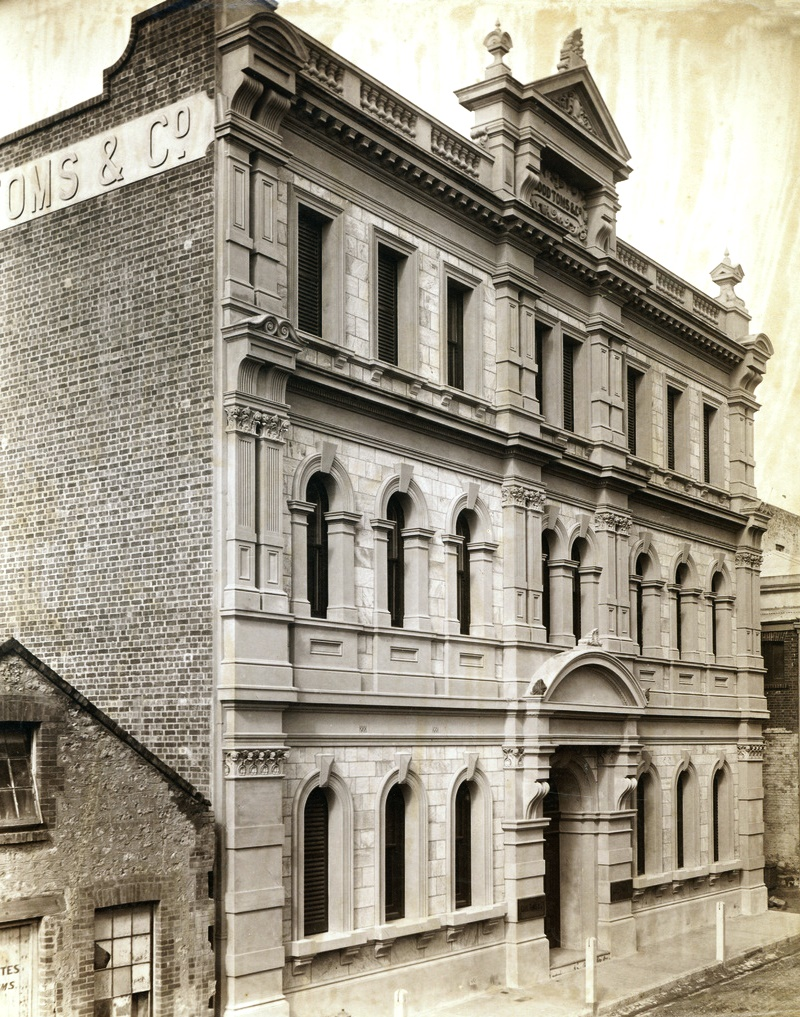
Good, Toms & Co. warehouse, Stephens Place

In 1872 Good and Samuel Toms founded the wholesale firm of Good, Toms & Co. on King William Street, later office on Wyatt Street and a warehouse at 22 Stephens Place. The business ceased trading in the early 1930s. In 1932 the warehouse was purchased by Charles Birks & Co and around 1934 incorporated into their adjacent retail establishment.

Good's business partner Samuel Toms (c. 1842 – 27 January 1907) may have been educated at J. L. Young's Adelaide Educational Institution. He worked at Goode Brothers' warehouse before joining with Thomas Good as Good, Toms & Co. Three of his sons were involved in the business. Toms was closely associated with the (Anglican) Trinity Church and was a keen cricketer, serving as umpire at many important games held at the Adelaide Oval. A third partner was William Kent, who managed the London office.

== Family ==
Thomas Good (c. 1822 – 21 January 1889) married Mary Ann Goode (c. 1822 – 21 July 1895) in 1850. She was a sister of emigrants Charles H. Goode, Matthew Goode (of Matthew Goode and Co.), Samuel Goode, jun., and Elizabeth Ann Goode.

- Emily Good (1851–1933) married Cornelius Proud ( –1905) in 1882
- Samuel Good (1856 – 31 January 1912) of Good, Toms, & Co.
- Mary Good (1858–1860)
- Annie Good (1859–1942) married David Williams (1856–1940) in 1884. He was an architect, working with brother-in-law Charles Thomas Good in their practice Williams & Good to design Tivoli Theatre (later Her Majesty's) and other prominent buildings in Adelaide.
- Elizabeth "Bessie" Good (1861–1921) married John Francis Hummel ( –1925) in 1884
- Charles Thomas Good (1864–1926) married Helena Russell Goode ( –1953) in 1890. He was an architect, and, in partnership with brother-in-law David Williams, designed the Grenfell Street premises of Goode, Durrant & Co., Her Majesty's Theatre; the Majestic Theatre; King's Theatre; and James Marshall & Co.'s emporium (1908); (later Myers).
- Dr. J(oseph) Ernest Good (6 December 1867 – 6 December 1935) married Agnes Minnie Williams ( –1954), served in several notable British hospitals, returned to practise in Prospect.

- Gwynnyth Fay Good (1899– ) married (John) Keith Angas (1900–1977) in 1924
- Phyllis Gypsy Good (1899–1947) married Cavendish Lister "Pat" Colley (1898–1982), a granddaughter of R. B. Colley, in 1923

- Miss L. Good ( – )

Good's sister Mary Harriet Good (c. 1830 – 18 August 1889) married his partner (later Sir) Charles Goode on 6 August 1856. She was an invalid for much of her adult life; they had no children.

== Other Adelaide softgoods wholesalers ==
- D. & W. Murray Limited
- G. & R. Wills & Co.
- Matthew Goode & Co
- Charles Henry Goode

(these two operated for 30 years as Goode Brothers)

== See also ==
- Thomas Goode (1816–1882), merchant of Goolwa
- Thomas Goode (c. 1834–1926), pastoralist of Canowie Station
