= Thomas Goode (merchant) =

Australian merchant (1816–1882)

Thomas Goode snr. JP. (May 1816 – 25 October 1882) (Goode sounds like 'good') was a South Australian merchant closely associated with the Murray River town of Goolwa.

== History ==
Goode was born in the parish of Thornbury, Herefordshire, England, in May 1816. In 1851 he arrived in South Australia, and in 1852 pitched his tent in Goolwa and shortly afterwards built a wooden general store and dwelling house near where the police station later stood. In those days Goolwa was known as "The Elbow", and Port Elliot as "The Knob", and the few residents were located in huts, the day of houses not having arrived for a locality so far away from the metropolis.

Goolwa was at the entrance through the Murray Mouth through which Captain Cadell's steamer the Lady Augusta made its first trip up the river as far as Swan Hill with Governor Young and party, and from where William Randell in Mary Ann made the same trip with little fanfare. The River Murray Steam Navigation Company followed, the tramway to Port Elliot was constructed, and the famous attempt at a breakwater there, later abandoned. It became a major transport hub before the construction of the road network, particularly of wool and wheat.

As Goolwa prospered his business grew with it, and necessitated the erection of commodious premises in Cadell Street. In 1873 he took over the business and stock of competitor Emanuel Cohen. Around 1880, with failing health, he gave up the business to his two sons, Thomas and Edward Goode, and retired to his residence "Thornbury", a short distance from the township. He suffered considerably before dying, and was buried in the Currency Creek cemetery. In March 1884 the shop was largely destroyed by fire, and was rebuilt within the old walls, which had survived largely intact.

In 1952 Thomas Goode & Co. of Goolwa celebrated the 100th year of trading in Goolwa, for most of that time in the same premises, and at that time under the managership of Harold Goode. The shop was still standing in 2011, as a homewares and clothing store "Chantillie Place", owned by local resident Peter Smith.

== Other interests ==
Mr Goode was chosen as Goolwa's first mayor, and for a number of years filled the office of Justice of the Peace also. The Southern Agricultural Society many times re-elected him as its President, and he was frequently urged to accept nomination to the House of Assembly, but he always declined. He believed in the practicability of the Goolwa canal scheme (which would have cut a direct route from the town to the sea; a scheme for which a parliamentary Bill was passed but never implemented), and advocated its formation with great energy, gathering a great deal of information and making some valuable diagrams and models illustrating how it could be carried out.

In those days of limited populations in country villages medical attendance was a scarce article, but Mr. Goode had considerable skill and knowledge in surgery and pharmacy (he was a member of the Pharmaceutical Society of Great Britain), and his advice and medicines were greatly valued, without fee or reward, as many owners of broken legs and arms could testify.

== Family ==
A related Goode family came from Kyre Magna, Worcestershire: Thomas, Charles, Henry Abel, William and Benjamin Powell Goode on the Hope in 1858. William, B. P., H. A. Goode worked a shop at Yankalilla Charles Rufus Goode came out in 1860, Another brother, Matthew arrived on the South Australian in 1868. Two sisters, Ann (about whom little has been found) and Elizabeth (c. 1837 – 28 May 1925) who married a Mr. Porter, had daughter Mrs David Herbertson also migrated to South Australia.

Thomas Goode snr. JP. (May 1816 – 25 October 1882) was married to Catharine Goode (died 4 May 1859); they had a daughter Fanny (c. 1855 – 27 January 1911) and two sons:

=== Tom Goode ===
Thomas "Tom" Goode jun. (1846 – 14 July 1921) born in Hereford, came out with his parents, was educated at St Peter's College and for a few years in England but returned to take over the business when his father took ill. He also held interests (as Goode & Johnston) in steamers serving Lakes Albert and Alexandrina, and owned the paddle-steamer City of Oxford. He was a Justice of the Peace and a Commissioner of Affidavits of the Supreme Court, was at one time Mayor of Goolwa, and was President of the local Agricultural Society, and also of the Regatta Club and Institute. He was also President of the British and Foreign Bible Society. Tom Goode acted as deputy electoral returning officer for a long period, was captain of the local rifle club, and was a non-commissioned officer of cavalry under Lieut.-Col. Higgins at the time of the visit of the Duke of Edinburgh to Adelaide. He was present at the opening of the bridge over the creek at Ashbourne, and at the laying of the foundation stone of the Adelaide G.P.O., which ceremonies were performed by the Duke of Edinburgh. He was also a member of the Encounter Bay School Board of Advice, a local preacher in the Methodist Church, and superintendent of the Sunday school for 40 years, a member of the Corinthian Lodge of Freemasons, and Past Master of the Grand Lodge of South Australia. He died after a brief illness and a subsequent operation.

He married (1) Jane Harkes "Jeannie" Johnston (c. 1850 – 23 March 1896) (a daughter of Capt. Thomas Johnston, a pioneer river trader; his brother Edward married her sister Alison Ross Johnston c. 1880) on 22 March 1872. They had seven sons and four daughters. (2) Margaret Annie "Maggie" Ritchie (sister of the Hon. George Ritchie) and daughter of Capt. James Ritchie, another Murray pioneer, on 27 November 1901. Their children were:

- T(homas) Charles Goode, of Mypolonga (1873 – 22 June 1947) After leaving college he was employed by his uncle at Matthew Goode & Co., of Adelaide, then after assisting in his father's business at Goolwa, went to Broken Hill, where he ran a drapery business. He returned to the River Murray, and traded on the Lower Murray and Lakes. When the Mypolonga irrigation settlement was opened, he was one of the original settlers. He was later in charge of a number of steamers for the Murray Shipping Co. and for A. H. Landseer. Ltd. During the last two years he was part-owner, with P. W. Richards, of the excursion steamer Renmark. Mr. Goode was a local Methodist preacher. He died at his son's home in Yankalilla; his remains were buried at the Currency Creek cemetery.

His first wife was Janet Harkes Dickson ( – 18 June 1904), a daughter of Capt. James Dickson, of Goolwa on 9 November 1898. He married again, to Esther Julienne "Ethie" Gibson on 6 May 1908. He left two sons and two daughters: Keith Goode (Goolwa), David Goode (Yankalilla), Jean (Mrs. D. Hill of Mypolonga) and Betty (Mrs. C. Groth of Torrens Vale).

- Catherine or Katherine "Kitty" Goode (1875– ) married Charles William Rogers (c. 1870 – 3 February 1949) on 22 May 1901. Charles was a senior Commonwealth Public Servant and prominent in the Unley Methodist Church and Sunday School; Catherine was active in Unley branch of the Woman's Christian Temperance Union, serving as president and secretary.
- Arthur Goode (1877 – 9 June 1912) was a commercial traveller in Western Australia for Goode Durrant and Co.
- Francis "Frank" Goode (14 June 1879 – c. May 1951) was educated at the Goolwa public school and Prince Alfred College. On leaving school he entered the Goolwa post office and later spent 11 years in Adelaide, first on the staff of the Bank of Adelaide and later in the employ of Matthew Goode and Co. In 1906 he began a business at Meningie, using a converted Echuca steamer Undaunted and later at Narrung as well. In 1937 he sold his business and took the position of clerk of the Meningie District Council, in which he served until a few months before his death at Meningie.

In 1911 he married Adeline Cross, who, with two sons, F. William and T. M. "Max" Goode, and three daughters, Mary (Mrs. Bob Bond) and her twin Marjorie, and Eleanor H. (Mrs. Hope R. Watts), survived him.

- Harold Dakin? Deykin? Goode (9 April 1881 – ) took over the Goolwa store. He was very active in the community, serving as auditor for the Goolwa Council from 1904 to 1931 (and mayor in 1931), committee member of the Goolwa Regatta Club, Goolwa Athletic Club, Goolwa Bowls Club, Goolwa Institute and Alexandra Bowling Association, including many stints as secretary or president of these organisations. He was president of Goolwa Regatta Club from 1930 to 1933, Mayor from 1929 to 1932, secretary of the Goolwa Institute, on the finance committee of the South Coast Hospital, Justice of the Peace and president of Goolwa Bowling Club. H. D. Goode sold the business in 1952.

He married Lanetta Goss (daughter of Rev. J. H. Goss) on 27 March 1918. Lived at "Thornbury".

- (Edward) Leslie Goode (1883 – 30 November 1946) married Margaret Lucy Hummel (1885 – 6? 8? April 1937) on 4 October 1917 dairy farmer of Narrung. Moved to Dulwich c. 1950.
- Ethel Jane Goode (1885–1967) married second cousin Alfred Henry Lancelot "Lance" Goode, of Port Pirie on 3 April 1912. Lance was a son of Henry Abel Goode of H. A. and W. Goode.
- (George) Roy Goode (28 October 1887 – 8 July 1938) was educated at the Goolwa public school and Prince Alfred College, after which he worked for his uncle Edward for a few years then worked a farm at Narrung. As Sergeant Roy Goode, he saw active service in Egypt during World War I. President of local RSL and Chairman of Meningie District Council. He died at Murray Bridge after an illness of six weeks.

He married Dorothy R. Bruce ( – ) of Norwood on 26 January 1916, children Margaret, Betty, Ross and Colin.

- Jeannie Eva Goode (1890– ) married (Frederick) Leslie Bundey on 18 August 1915. Bundey was a land agent and mayor of Laura for three years then land valuer for the Savings Bank of South Australia. Moved to Ferguson Square, Toorak Gardens.
- Fanny Elizabeth "Bess" Goode (1892– ) married Lindsay Harrison Mann, of Loveday Bay, near Narrung on 6 August 1919.
- Alan Stanley Goode (1897? 27 February 1896? – 11 January 1917) was born at Goolwa, and was educated in the local public school and Adelaide High School. He was a member of the Unley Methodist Church, and took an active interest in the Unley Sunday School and the Young Men's Class. He was also a member of the Y.M.C.A. and the Flinders Street Baptist Literary Society and Military Band. On leaving Adelaide High School he entered the service of D. & W. Murray, of Adelaide, where he remained until his enlistment. He left Adelaide on 21 September 1915 for Egypt, and later proceeded to France. He took part in the Battle of Pozières, where he was wounded. After some time in hospital he was sent to a convalescent home in France, and later, as Lance-Corporal, was killed in action in France. There were ten other representatives of the Goode family at the front.

=== Edward Goode ===
Edward Goode (1851 – 5 September 1942) was educated at St. Peters' College, and in 1870 went to England to complete his commercial education. He was partner with brother Thomas until he opened a shop of his own in Kingston. In 1901 he took up farming and grazing at Barooka station, Kingston where he took a keen interest in the South-Eastern drainage scheme, and many other activities in the district. He was chairman of the local drainage league, chairman of the Kingston school board for 20 years, chairman of the Kingston Agricultural Horticultural and Pastoral Society, and a member of the Lacepede District Council for 31 years.

He married Alison Ross Johnston ( – 2 December 1923) on 26 February 1880. She was a daughter of Captain Thomas Johnston (who may have been a cousin of George Bain Johnston); his brother Tom (see above) married her sister Jane. Their children included Edward D. Goode and Thomas J. "Tom" Goode of Kingston, Alick Ferguson Goode (c. June 1889 – 20 September 1917) of Goolwa, who was killed in World War I, Elsie, May, Gladys and Kathleen "Kath" Goode, who married William P. C. "Perce" Criddle, none of whom received significant public attention.

Thomas Lowndes Goode (c. 1832 – 21 July 1893) of Goode and Cussen, merchants of Stephens Place may have been a relation as he returned to live at Brock Hall, Leominster, Herefordshire. business on Stephens Place (nearly opposite Goode Brothers) with Robert Cussen (c. 1830 – 10 July 1913). Declared insolvent 1864. Business with Claude Shuttleworth (c. 1820 – 27 May 1892), wine merchants, (as Shuttleworth and Co.) Home at Brougham Place. Left on Yatala February 1866, declared insolvent 1866.

Cecil Herbert Goode, Thomas Milton Goode, Malvern Clifton Goode of Sheaoak Hill, Terowie sheepfarmers. CHG became commission agent, salesman with Ernest James Rutherford Pullar then with John Frederick Thiem. CHG married Frances I. Sawers on 10 April 1906.

Georgina M. Goode of Goolwa unpaid teacher monitor in 1897 http://trove.nla.gov.au/ndp/del/article/87763729-->

== Bibliography ==
- Goss, J. H. A brief memoir of Lance-Corporal Alan Stanley Goode (youngest son of Mr. Thos. Goode, J.P., of Goolwa) who was killed in action in France on 11 January 1917 published by J. H. Goss, Goolwa 1917. Copy held at State Library of South Australia.
