= Currency Creek =

Currency Creek may refer to the following located in South Australia:

- Currency Creek (South Australia), a river
- Currency Creek, South Australia, a locality
- Currency Creek Arboretum
- Currency Creek wine region
- Currency Creek Game Reserve
