= H. A. and W. Goode =

H. A. & W. Goode was one of the largest regional department stores in the early days of South Australia, with stores in Yankalilla, Aldinga, Willunga, then finally and most notably in Port Pirie. Its principals were three brothers, Henry Abel Goode, William Goode and Benjamin Powell Goode, all born at Kyre Magna, in Worcestershire, sons of farmer William Goode.

The Goodes who emigrated from Kyre Magna (also called Kyre Wyard, and now just inside Herefordshire) were: Thomas Goode of Canowie Station, Henry Abel Goode, William and Benjamin Powell Goode on the Hope in 1858, Charles Rufus Goode (of Port Pirie) on the Princess Helena in 1860, and Matthew Goode (of Willunga) on the South Australian in 1868. Also on the South Australian was their sister Ann. Another brother, Samuel (d.1878) and a sister Elizabeth (c. 1837 – 1912) remained behind. Elizabeth married Alfred John Prince Porter, a master tailor, moved with him and her brother Samuel, also a tailor, to Newcastle-upon-Tyne, England, and had ten children. Her second child Alfred John Porter joined the Goodes in Australia in about 1883. The youngest, Eva, married one David Herbertson: their descendants subsequently moved to Australia.

Matthew Goode (c. 1820–1901) of Matthew Goode and Co, Thomas Goode (1816–1882) of Goolwa, and Sir Charles Henry Goode were cousins. Matthew Goode married a Miss Jones before leaving England. She died, and Matthew married her sister Elisabeth Jones ( – 19 May 1902) in 1853. Three other sisters married the three principals of H. A. and W. Goode: Frances (c. 1845 – 1 February 1930) married Benjamin Powell Goode on 19 June 1867; Emily Georgeanna Jones (October 1845 – 17 October 1932) married Henry Abel Goode on 19 August 1868 and Marion Jones (c. 1853–1929) married William Goode in 1873. The Jones sisters were daughters of Edward Jones (c. 1792 – 29 January 1880) of Haywood, Herefordshire, later of Finniss Point, South Australia then Hutt Street, Adelaide.

== History ==
Three brothers, Thomas, Henry, and Benjamin arrived in South Australia in 1858, after a voyage of 122 days in the sailing vessel Hope. William found employment in the wholesale and retail drapery business Goode Bros., on Rundle Street (where Charles Birks & Co. later stood), owned by his cousins Matthew and Charles Henry Goode. The wholesale business moved to Stephens Place, and later became Matthew Goode and Co. William and his brother Henry were with the firm for six years.

On leaving his cousin's employ William and Henry bought general stores at Aldinga and Yankalilla, (licences granted in 1879) employing their brother Benjamin to manage for them at Yankalilla. Business boomed and Benjamin was admitted to the partnership. A second shop was bought in Aldinga, and one at Willunga, and the four establishments returned a profit.

In 1878 the partners bought out Brown, Wood, & Scrutton, who ran a small store in Port Pirie, and improved the business year by year until it assumed large proportions. In 1896 they sold the southern businesses and in 1905 the replacement two storey store, one of the architectural features of Ellen Street, was completed. The premises occupied a frontage of nearly 80 ft. by a depth of 95 ft. In 1909 they sold the business to Mrs. Robert Knox and William Miller, of Wilcannia, but it carried on as "H. A. & W. Goode" (later "Goode Brothers"), and was one of the largest concerns outside Adelaide.

In 1914 a limited liability company was formed to run the business, with Knox and Lance Goode as directors and W. E. Wainwright as Chairman. In 1916 the business again changed hands, with J. B. Johnston, H. W. Goode, and Mrs. Frances Goode as the new proprietors. Mrs. Goode died in 1930, and in 1932 the business was purchased by the family of H. A. Goode, with Lance Goode as managing partner. Its trading name reverted to the original "H. A. & W. Goode".

In 1923 the store's magazine was forced open and some gelignite stolen. A subsequent attempt to blast open the strongroom failed, but the ensuing fire created a great deal of damage. No-one was ever charged with the offences.

== Henry Abel Goode ==
Henry Abel Goode (1838 – 12 February 1921) was born at Kyre Magna, Worcestershire, in 1838. He embarked for South Australia by the sailing vessel Hope in 1857, and reached Port Adelaide after a voyage lasting 152 days. Six years later, with his brother, William Goode, he founded the firm of H. A. & W. Goode, in which, subsequently, their brother Benjamin P. Goode, of Port Pirie, became a partner. The business, which was conducted at Aldinga and Port Pirie, grew to large dimensions. In 1909 Mr. Goode relinquished his connection with the firm, and lived in retirement. During his business life he did a considerable amount of stock valuing, and was recognised in commercial circles as an expert.

=== Family ===
Henry Abel Goode married Emily Georgina Jones (October 1845 – 17 October 1932), a daughter of Edward Jones, of Finniss Point, on 19 August 1868. Their children included:

- Alice Elizabeth Goode (1869 – 14 October 1931) married David Henry Hollidge (1868-1963); their homes were "Kyre House", Unley Park then "Kyrwood" Hyde Park. Hollidge was prominent in the Baptist Union and founder in 1902 of Kyre College in Thornber Street, Unley, which eventually became Scotch College, Adelaide. One A. E. Goode was a teacher at Canowie (her uncle Thomas was manager of Canowie station) in 1892; this may have been Alice Elizabeth.
- Florence Marion Goode (1870 – 14 May 1914) married Charles Edgar Birks (8 October 1871 – 20 June 1944) on 21 June 1899. She was an invalid for the last two years of her life.
- (Frances) Ethel Goode (1872 – 18 May 1954) married second cousin (Matthew) Albert Goode ( – 14 June 1939) on 25 October 1894. Albert was a son of Matthew Goode, founder of Matthew Goode and Co.
- Emily Constance Goode (1873 – 22 August 1953) married William Edward Wainwright on 27 October 1900. Wainwright was General Manager of Broken Hill South Ltd.
- Rose Evelyn Goode (1874– ) married Sydney Cooper on 17 May 1905
- Laura Mary Goode (1876–) married Edward Percival Newman (c. 1871 – September 1951) on 9 May 1906. Newman was closely associated with the Unley Methodist Church.
- Maud Goode (1877– ) married Oswald Hunter ( – 25 October 1932). Oswald was a partner in the legal firm of Hunter, Boucaut, Martin and Ashton.
- Jessie Beatrice Goode (1879– ) never married. Her home in 1954 was 74 Winchester Street, Malvern.
- Alfred Henry Lancelot "Lance" Goode (1884–1960) married second cousin Ethel J. Goode on 3 April 1912. Ethel was a daughter of Thomas Goode. Lance was a land agent in Port Pirie, ran Pirie's Central Market, and from 1912 was a manager of Goode Bros. When the Goode family bought back the business in 1932 Lance was appointed Managing Director.

- Dr. H. A. Goode
- Don Goode was aircraftman for Royal Australian Air Force during World War II

- (William) Howard Goode (c. March 1886 – ) Howard was wounded in action during World War I, left leg amputated above the knee. Ran a shop on Prospect Road, Prospect

He died at his residence "Strathclyde" at 99 Mitchell Street, Hyde Park, South Australia after a long illness.

== William Goode ==
William Goode (c. 1840 – 28 January 1910) was a businessman in the early days of South Australia, with interests in Yankalilla, Aldinga, Willunga, but was most notable in connection with Port Pirie.

- While working with his cousins in Adelaide he served in the Eastern Suburban volunteer Company.
- He served several terms as town councillor in Port Pirie, and was mayor from 1882 to 1883. He took a leading role in the advancement of the town: securing the railway link to Broken Hill via Silverton and Petersburg which succeeded, at least in part, by wooing Sir John Colton and his "Big Ministry" which included Sir Jenkin Coles, C. C. Kingston and Tom Playford
- He helped promote the port ahead of Port Augusta by encouraging investment in dredging operations, water supply and harbor facilities.
- He was the first chairman of the committee which established an institute in Alexander Street, Port Pirie, and later its two-storey replacement.
- He, with the Hon. J. H. Howe and W. Wood, Thomas Magor and others persuaded the Government to declare the present site of the smelting works as a manufacturing reserve. In order to prevent this land from getting into the hands of speculators they secured the lease of it themselves, and when W. H. Patten visited Port Pirie to evaluate the country on behalf of the British Broken Hill Company they were in a position to guarantee them a suitable site.
- He was a big shareholder in a syndicate which bored for coal in the Crystal Brook Creek. They found nothing, and abandoned the search when the drill broke.
- He was largely instrumental in the opening up of flux quarries in the district.
- He was active in the Port Pirie Agricultural, Horticultural, and Floricultural Society, and the Piscatorial Society, of which he was for some time president.
- He helped promote the Port Pirie branch of the District Trained Nursing Society, of which he was treasurer.
- He was an active member of the vigilance committee, and the Pioneers' Association.
- He was a trustee of the Methodist Church, and supported foundation of a local corps of the Salvation Army in 1883.
- He was patron of the Port Pirie Rowing Club.
- He was appointed to the School Board of Advice for Port Pirie in 1879.
- He was appointed Justice of the Peace sometime before 1878.

=== Character ===
William Goode, in an obituary in the Port Pirie Recorder was described as the finest natural orator the editor had known, a man of great tenacity and steadfastness of purpose; not an analytical thinker but a fine organiser and generous friend, an imposing figure with "towering forehead, craggy brows, and deep-set, piercing grey eyes ... determined mouth and square jaw ... at social gatherings he always seemed to say the right thing and in the happiest words ... he had a fine sense of the fitness of things, and frequently saved an awkward situation ... Mr. Goode's hostility and implacability in the contentious field of politics was to some hard to reconcile with his nobility of character socially and privately. ... It will be years ere we shall look on his like again".

=== Family ===
William Goode married Marion Jones (c. 1853–1929). Their children included:

- William Ernest Goode (1874– ), of "Konetta" Wandearah (not to be confused with William Edward Goode (c. 1857–1929) of White's River station, husband of Mrs. A. K. Goode. He was reported as losing his parents when quite young.)
- Harry Edward Goode (1876– ), of Port Pirie
- Helen Marion "Nell" Goode (1877– ) married John Vere Sidford on 23 April 1902
- Samuel Walter Goode C.I.E. (25 November 1878 – 23 January 1935) married Jane Reed Beatson-Bell of Edinburgh on 9 August 1911. He was a brilliant student of Way College, Adelaide and Cambridge Universities, was appointed to the Indian Civil Service. He was chairman of the Calcutta Corporation, and author of Municipal Calcutta: Institutions in Their Origin and Growth. He died in Budapest.
- Alfred Britten Goode (1881– )
- Myra Elizabeth Goode (1882– ) married Edward Clyde Padman ( – 1 January 1950) on 1 September 1908
- Third daughter Nita Francis Goode (1884– ) married Cecil Henry Bompas, son of Judge Bompas, on 27 September 1911. Nita was a pianist of some ability.
- Gordon Powell Goode M.D. (1886– )
- Clive Goode (1887– )
- Grant Jones Goode (September 1888 – 13 August 1892), was killed accidentally when the gangway of the ship Archdale fell. The mate who had been carrying him was injured slightly.
- Muriel Gertrude Goode (1890– )
- Eric Rolfe Goode (1893 – 27 April 1915) was killed in action at the Battle of Lone Pine.

== B. P. Goode ==
Benjamin Powell "Ben" Goode (3 July 1842 15 August 1914) was born at Pigeon House, Kyre Magna Worcestershire and with brothers Tom, H. A., Charles and William, emigrated to South Australia on the sailing ship Hope, arriving in 1850 after a long and protracted voyage. He secured a position as assistant at a general store in Shea-Oak Log but after 18 months contracted typhoid fever and was obliged to return to Adelaide to recuperate. He next worked at Mount Barker then to Goolwa. In 1866 he was appointed to control his brothers' shop at Yankalilla, which had just been purchased from Messrs. Allen and Jones, of Aldinga. Three years later he was admitted as a member of the firm, but did not move to Port Pirie until 1880.

Unlike his brother William, he did not readily take to public utterances, though on occasion he proved himself a forceful and effective speaker. Like his brothers, he was a large man and had a powerful baritone voice, leading the Pirie Methodist Church choir for 14 years. He was several times elected as auditor for the Town Council, but otherwise had a low public profile. He was one of the founders of the Port Pirie Institute, and was made a life member. He made a study of homeopathy and was frequently called upon to assist in cases of infantile illnesses.

He suffered a debilitating stroke in 1909 and another in 1910 but he remained gravely ill for another four years.

=== Family ===
He married Frances "Fanny" Jones (c. 1845 – 1 February 1930) in 1867. Among their children were:

- Lilian May "Milly" Goode (1868 – 26 October 1918) married John Bathgate Johnston (c. 1871 – 25 June 1944) on 27 September 1894. J. B. Johnston was a son of River Murray pioneer George Bain Johnston.
- Catherine Elizabeth Goode (1870– ) married John Drew on 29 September 1892
- Benjamin Herbert "Bert" Goode (1872 – 23 April 1953) married Elizabeth Agnes
- Harold William "Harry" Goode (1876 – 14 October 1943) married Ida Alice Pimlott on 18 January 1905
- Eleanor? Ellinor? Mary Goode (1878 – ) married Harry Mortimer "Harry" Jacka on 2 July 1902.
- Dr. Matthew Edward "Matt" Goode (1880 – ) was elected mayor of Port Pirie in 1919, defeating L. A. Hopkins.
- Dr. A(lfred) Reginald "Reg" Goode (1884 – ) married Isabel B. Hooper on 12 December 1911
- Ethel J. Goode ( – 2 May 1909) married Captain Frederick Wardlaw Davies (many references have "Davis") in England on 22 August 1901; home at "Ravenswood", West Kirby, England. She contracted tuberculosis in 1908 and never recovered. Not to be confused with Ethel Jane Goode (1885–1967), daughter of Thomas and Jane Harkes Goode, and married second cousin A. H. Lancelot Goode in 1912.
- (John) Douglas Goode (1887– ) married Ethel Beatrice Halliday on 22 February 1910

Their home for many years was "Flinders House", Port Pirie.
