= Richard Berry (missionary) =

English missionary and captain (1824–1908)

- Born: March 25, 1824; Ilfracombe, Devonshire, England
- Died: January 20, 1908 (aged 83); Gilberton, Adelaide, Australia
- Occupation: City Missonary

Richard Berry (25 March 1824 – 20 January 1908) was an English ship's captain who became a City Missionary in Adelaide, South Australia.

== History ==
Captain Berry was born at the seaport of Ilfracombe, in Devonshire, and early resolved on the life of a sailor. He went to sea with an uncle for a couple of voyages, and amongst his companions on board ship he was known as the boy who did not drink. He was a determined teetotaler and fervent religious adherent. He married when a comparatively young man, and subsequently accepted the position of missionary on the east coast of Scotland for the Scottish Coast Mission Committee.

Whilst in that position he met Captain George Johnston, who was visiting Scotland for the purpose of obtaining a steamboat for the River Murray trade. Johnston had secured the boat and the crew, and offered the captaincy to Berry. He had not been at sea for many years, but he was anxious to see Australia, and on 1 February 1866 he sailed the steamer Murray, set up as a schooner, for Australia, and Victor Harbor was reached on 17 June.

In 1867. Captain Berry accepted the position of city missionary at the Adelaide City Mission, the centre of its operations then being in Ackland Street, off Pirie Street east, where he discharged his duties efficiently. He took a keen interest in the Adelaide Benevolent and Strangers' Friend Society, and at one period also acted as religious instructor to the Yatala Labor Prison, which he visited weekly. Captain Berry laboured steadily on at the Ackland Street Mission among the poor and needy in the city, and had the satisfaction of seeing it grow to such an extent that larger premises became necessary. The commodious building on the west side of Light Square was erected; the Hon. John Darling contributing £500 to defray the cost. He was city missionary for 20 years, until a shrinkage in subscriptions was used by the committee to cut his salary then installed him in the newly established East Adelaide City Mission, a post he only relinquished when the infirmities of age compelled him to retire.

He died at his home in Gilberton. His son may have been the secretary of the Port Adelaide Society of Marine Engineers.
