= Scott Conservation Park =

Protected area in South Australia

- IUCN category III (natural monument or feature)
- Location within South Australia
- Location: South Australia
- Nearest city: Currency Creek
- Coordinates: 35°24′52″S 138°44′12″E
- Area: 2.1 km^{2} (0.81 sq mi)
- Established: 20 March 1969
- Governing body: Department for Environment and Water

Scott Conservation Park (formerly Scott National Park) is a protected area located in the Australian state of South Australia in the locality of Currency Creek about 55 kilometres (34 mi) south of the state capital of Adelaide and about 4.7 kilometres (2.9 mi) north-west of the town centre in Currency Creek.

The conservation park consists of land in sections 218 and 347 in the cadastral unit of the Hundred of Goolwa. On 20 March 1969, it was proclaimed under the National Parks Act 1966 as Scott National Park. On 27 April 1972, it was reconstituted as Scott Conservation Park upon the proclamation of the National Parks and Wildlife Act 1972. As of 2018, it covered an area of 2.1 square kilometres (0.81 sq mi).

In 1980, it was described as follows:

A small park featuring vegetation representative of the eastern slopes of the southern Mount Lofty ranges. As one of few blocks of scrub in this region it is significant for conservation purposes… A small park on gently sloping land. The principal vegetation is an open forest of Eucalyptus leucoxylon but large patches of E. baxteri occur in the southern portion of the Park. Elsewhere mixed stands of E. leucoxylon with E. fasciculosa are found. The understorey is diverse but usually dominated by E. cosmophylla and Banksia ornata … Scott Conservation Park is in a minimally disturbed condition having suffered only light grazing in the past. The park is largely surrounded by cleared grazing land…

The conservation park is classified as an IUCN Category III protected area. In 1980, it was included on the now-defunct Register of the National Estate.

== See also ==
- Protected areas of South Australia
