= Charles Rufus Goode =

Australian politician (1844–1913)

Member of the South Australian House of Assembly for Burra
- In office 1896–1899

Personal details
- Born: 27 April 1844 Worcestershire, England
- Died: 4 August 1913 (aged 69) Port Pirie, Australia
- Party: National Defence League

Charles Rufus Goode (27 April 1844 – 4 August 1913) was a pastoralist and politician in the early days of South Australia.

== History ==
Charles Rufus Goode was born on 27 April 1844, at Kyre Magna, in Worcestershire, England, and came to Australia in 1860. Immediately after his arrival he went to Canowie station, under instructions from the Hon. H. Scott, whom he saw before leaving England. Later he engaged in pastoral pursuits in the Port Lincoln district with his cousin (Mr. S. Goode), and subsequently entered into the service of Elder and Stuckey, in connection with stations in the Far North.

In 1865 he went with Samuel Joseph Stuckey (born 21 March 1837) to India to bring back a consignment of camels and donkeys. He acted as supercargo on the return voyage and remained in charge of the herds until 1867. This was the first lot of camels ever brought to South Australia.

In 1868 he settled at Saddleworth, and after some time farming and grazing commenced business as an auctioneer and agent. He remained at Saddleworth until he became a Government tenant in Bundaleer Forest Reserve.

He was always interested in public affairs, and after acting at various times on the Saddleworth District Council, the Clare Licensing Bench, the Midland Road Board, the Saddleworth School Board, the Pastoral Board (under the Act of 1884), and the Central Land Board, he was elected as a National Defence League member of the House of Assembly for the district of Burra at the general election in 1896. He refused nomination three years later.

Goode was manager of Canowie station in 1900 but was forced to leave Canowie due to ill health in 1906.

== Family ==
Goode was a son of William and Catherine Goode of Kyre Magna, near Tenbury, Worcestershire, who came to South Australia in the 1850s and 60s. His brothers Thomas, William, Henry Abel and Benjamin Powell Goode came out on the Hope in February 1858, Charles Rufus in 1860, and Matthew on the South Australian in 1868.

Charles married Mary Gardiner at Port Augusta in 1869. Among their children were:

- Charles Henry Goode (November 1868 – 28 March 1940) see biography below
- Thomas Gardiner Goode (poss.3 October 1869 – ) married Alice Isabel Gillespie ( – 15 September 1910) of Whyte Yarcowie on 18 December 1907 and moved to Tambellup, Western Australia, where she was accidentally killed by gunshot.
- Hedley H. Goode of Poonda Station, Western Australia
- Stanley L. Goode of Hummocks Hill then Corny Point
- (Samuel James) Mortimer "Mort" Goode (district councillor, Wandearah)

- (Lindsay) Rufus Goode (10 August 1913 – 31 October 1942) married Marjorie Arnold, joined A.I.F. awarded D.C.M. in 1941, and M.M., killed in action 1942. His sister Dorothy was a nurse at the front; brothers were Gordon and Matthew "Matt".

- Garry C. Goode married Margaret Sylvester Downey (ca.1884 – 16 October 1931) in 1909. He was president of the Wandearah Coursing Club.
- Wolseley C. Goode Jamestown
- Mrs. G. D. Inglis of Georgetown

=== Charles Henry Goode ===
Charles Henry Goode (November 1868 – 28 March 1940) was born at Saddleworth, South Australia, the eldest son of Charles Rufus Goode. He received some education there, but when his father moved to Canowie station around 1878, he was far more interested in cattle and horses. He spent some time with his uncle Thomas Goode.

From 1889 to 1892 he worked for the Beltana Pastoral Company in the north of the State, camel driving and carting wool from as far as Cordillo Downs, near the Queensland border, and developed a reputation as a hard man.

In 1892, he went south again and took up a block at Bundaleer. His father and the younger brothers were developing a nearby property. He was one of the founders of the Jamestown Racing Club; the family raced several horses, including the well-known Tostig, which was head of the father's stud, and Prince Edward, trained by Mr. W. Garnaut, which won five hurdle races in succession. He played football with the Jamestown team, and was a member of the Geebung Polo Club. Two of his hard-riding associates were Ben Hunt and Neil McLeod. He was an active member of the newly formed Jamestown Agricultural Society. A fine judge of bloodstock and shorthorns, his services were sought by various show societies. Around January 1897 he married Charlotte Marion Inglis (ca.1876 – 17 July 1898) of Georgetown, a daughter of pastoralist George Inglis. She died at Canowie after giving birth on 9 July 1898 to a son who did not survive.

He then enlisted with the Fifth Imperial Bushman's Contingent, commanded by Gen. F. Elliott. He spent the greater part of 1901 and 1902 in South Africa where he was involved in the battles of Grasspan and Groote Valley, then returned home to Bundaleer.

He married Annie Florence Richardson on 23 September 1903. She was a sister of Arthur Richardson, a noted cricketer. They remained in the Bundaleer district until 1919, when they moved to Wandearah West. Their sons were Harold, who died in 1922, Lisle (some references have Lyall) (of Warooka), and Colin (of Wandearah West). Their daughters were Alice (Mrs. Rex Torr of Adelaide) and Kathleen, who married James F. "Jim" Stanley of Pirie East) in February 1932. Kathleen and Alice ran the Wandearah post office until 1928 and their mother ran it for the next 13 years.

South Australian House of Assembly
Preceded by George Lake	Member for Burra; 1896–1899; With: Frederick Holder	Succeeded by Ben Rounsevell
