= Samuel Goode (mayor) =

Australian politician

- Born: October 1819; Hampton Charles, Herefordshire
- Died: 26 July 1901 (aged 81–82)

Samuel Goode (/ɡuːd/, October 1819 – 26 July 1901) was a mayor of Adelaide, South Australia.

== History ==
He arrived in South Australia on 24 September 1850 on the Princess Helena with his parents Samuel and Mrs. Goode, brothers Matthew (later of Matthew Goode and Co) and Charles Henry (later Sir Charles, founder of Goode, Durrant and Co.), and sister Mrs Marshall. Another brother, Ernest Russell Goode ( – 23 June 1927) was born at Ivingtonbury and emigrated to South Australia.

In England he had worked on his father's farm, but for much of his first seven years in South Australia he worked as a draper with brothers Matthew and Charles as Goode Brothers. In 1857 he returned to England to marry a Miss Russell of Kingsland near Leominster and returned to Adelaide, rejoining his brothers' firm. He returned to Leominster around 1860, where at Ivingtonbury he profitably bred Hereford cattle and served on the Leominster town council. In 1889 he again returned to Adelaide and ran farms near Islington railway station (later the suburbs Regency Park and Kilburn) and at north Norwood. He was elected to the Adelaide City Council and served as mayor from 1863 to 1864. To him fell the honour of laying the foundation stone for the new Town Hall's Albert Tower.

In 1865, he travelled with his wife and children to London on the clipper ship City of Adelaide (became the world's oldest surviving clipper ship).

He served as Chief Magistrate for a year. and was a member of the Royal Agricultural and Horticultural Society and its president from 1900 to 1901.

He was a member of the Agriculture Bureau and closely followed the improvements in yield that accompanied scientific use of artificial fertilizers.

== Family ==
Samuel Goode married Miss Russell, a daughter of E. Russell of Kingsland, Herefordshire, in 1857. Their children included:

- Their eldest son Charles Henry Goode jun. (ca.1851 – 2 September 1914) married Jessie Gertrude Chaplin on 7 July 1903. Charles, who was named for his uncle Sir Charles, was severely incapacitated by a childhood accident, and noted for his good humour and strength of character. He worked as an insurance agent and was closely associated with the North Adelaide and Unley Baptist Churches.
- Second daughter Helena Russell Goode (ca.1866 – 8 June 1953) married architect Charles Thomas Good (1864 – 1 March 1926) on 26 March 1890. Their home was "Radmarley", 92 Cross Road, Myrtle Bank.
- Edith Russell Goode (1868–) married Rev. Albert Sidney Devenish (12 September 1863 – 5 April 1947) on 21 April 1903.
- Kate Russell "Katie" Goode ( – 18 March 1946) married Frank William Varley (ca.1863 – 26 June 1942) on 19 December 1896. They had a home at 555 Burke Road, Camberwell, Victoria.
- Helena "Nellie" Russell Goode married cousin Charles Thomas Good on 26 March 1890
- Their youngest daughter, Fannie (or Fanny) Russell Goode ( – 22 February 1895), married cousin Dr. Joseph Ernest Good (6 December 1867 – 6 December 1935) on 10 October 1894 She died around five months later. He married again, to Agnes Minnie Williams ( – 23 December 1954), Dr. Good was a descendant of Surgeon Major Good, medical attendant to the Duke of Wellington.
- Ernest Russell Goode ( – 23 June 1927) married Annie Edith Stacy ( – 7 July 1937) in 1897, lived at Clark Street, Wayville; she later lived at 56 Tusmore avenue, Tusmore. They had a son, Keith, and daughters Muriel and Gwen.

He died at his residence "Montpellier" in Hill street, North Adelaide. Two sons and three daughters survived him. They had another property, also called "Montpellier" in Parkside, South Australia.

Political offices
Preceded by Thomas English	Mayor of the Corporation of Adelaide; 1864–1866	Succeeded by William Townsend
