= George "Blue" Johnston =

Australian rules footballer (1907–??)

Personal information
- Full name: George Bain Johnston
- Born: 27 March 1907; Birkenhead, South Australia

Playing career^{1}
Years	Club	Games (Goals)
1927–1940	Glenelg, (SANFL)	203 (161)
- ^{1} Playing statistics correct to the end of 1940.

Career highlights
- Inaugural Glenelg premiership team 1934; Best and fairest for Glenelg 1932, 1936–1937; Played 16 games for South Australia; Magarey Medallist 1934; Inducted Glenelg Hall of Fame 2002; Inducted SANFL Hall of Fame 2002

George Bain "Blue" Johnston" (27 March 1907, date of death unknown) was an Australian rules footballer who played for Glenelg in the South Australian National Football League (SANFL) between 1927 and 1940.

Johnston was nicknamed "Blue" in typical Australian fashion due to his red hair. Johnston played when the Glenelg club (formed in 1920) was still very much struggling to be competitive against the other seven, more established, sides in the League. Indeed, apart from the 1934 premiership, the highest the club finished during Johnston's playing career was sixth.

Johnston played 203 league games (the first Glenelg player to pass the 200 mark) during his career, won three best and fairest awards, and put in a best afield performance as the club broke its premiership duck against Port Adelaide in 1934. He also won the SANFL's highest individual honour – the Magarey Medal for the best and fairest player – in 1934.

Jeff Pash, himself a Magarey Medallist in 1939, described Johnston as "a phenomenal leaper for the ball ... he had the sort of (frightening) steel-spring strength about him that John Coleman had. All of him – and he was tall and strong – was up there for that ball."

Although smaller than most opposition ruckmen, in addition to his leap, he was powerful, an asset which served him when playing for South Australia against the bigger bodies of Victoria.

== Family ==
George "Blue" Johnston was a son of George Johnston, captain of the S.S. Cadell on the Spencer Gulf trade, and the Charles Sturt on the River Murray. His grandfather, George Bain Johnston, was a noted pioneer of the River Murray steamboat era.
