= Keith Angas =

Australian politician

Sir John Keith Angas (30 January 1900 – 13 April 1977) was a pastoralist in South Australia. He was born at Lindsay Park near Angaston. He was the fourth child of Charles Howard Angas and his wife Etty (née Dean), and a great-grandson of George Fife Angas.

Angas married Gwynnyth Fay Good, granddaughter of merchant Thomas Good, in 1924 and in 1928 inherited the Lindsay Park property where he bred sheep, horses and deer. He enlisted in the Australian Military Forces in 1939 and was posted to the 13th Field Brigade, Royal Australian Artillery. In 1942 he transferred to the Australian Imperial Force and joined the Royal Australian Army Service Corps as a captain and remained in the army until July 1944. He sold Lindsay Park to a group led by Colin Hayes in 1965.

Angas was involved in many significant South Australian organisations. He was president of the Liberal and Country League from 1947 to 1950; chairman of the Institute of Medical and Veterinary Science from 1952 to 1962; the South Australian Jockey Club, Graziers' Federal Council of Australia 1939 to 1940; Elder Smith & Co Ltd, Horwood Bagshaw Ltd.; Bagot's Executor and Trustee Company; president of the Royal Automobile Association of South Australia from 1973 to 1975.

Angas was conferred a Knight Bachelor in the 1952 Queens Birthday Honours list in recognition of service to the pastoral industry.
