= Thomas Goode (pastoralist) =

Australian pastoralist and sheep breeder (1835–1926)

Thomas Goode (15 April 1835 – 22 July 1926) was a pastoralist in the Colony of South Australia.

== History ==
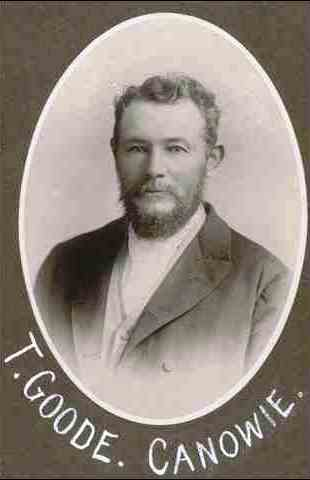
Thomas Goode of Canowie station ca.1885

Thomas Goode was born at Pigeon House farm, Kyre Magna, near Tenbury, Worcestershire, a son of William and Catherine Goode. From the age of 14 he managed his father's farms, and for two years at Felton Court, the home of his uncle Matthew Goode, who was a successful breeder of Hereford cattle, then left for South Australia on the Hope with brothers Henry Abel Goode (1838 – 12 February 1921), William (ca.1840 – 28 January 1910) and Benjamin Powell Goode (ca.1841), arriving at Port Adelaide on 19 February 1858. William, Henry and Benjamin Goode ran a shop at Yankalilla Charles Rufus Goode (1844–1913) came out in 1860, Another brother, Matthew (1847–1831) arrived on the South Australian in 1868.

Six weeks after his arrival in Adelaide he and a young man named Bruce rode the 120 miles (190 km) to Canowie Station with horses and cattle. His cousins Charles (afterwards Sir Charles), Samuel, and Matthew Goode, had country near Mount Remarkable, and they wished him to gain experience at Canowie before taking over Mount Remarkable for them. He was engaged at Canowie by the proprietors Abraham Scott, J. Frederick "Fred" Hayward and Richard Boucher James. A few weeks later Goode was sent to Willunga with an aboriginal stockman to get 92 cattle. Other work involved hunting for horses that had strayed from Canowie, and were found as far south as Anlaby Station (near Kapunda) and Shea-oak Log, 60 or 70 miles (100 or 110 km) away. Around 1858 Goode was made manager of Canowie station.

Canowie station is situated midway between Hallett and Jamestown in an amphitheatre of green bald hills, which surround it on the western side, the eastern opening out into a broad valley. The country around is bare of timber, with the exception of plantations of various kinds of eucalypt planted around 1880. The estate consisted principally of rich land, well suited for agriculture, about 60,000 acres (24,000 ha) in extent, freehold, and depastured 60,000 sheep and about 1000 pure Shorthorn cattle.

The Canowie Shorthorn cattle won multiple prizes at the Adelaide Show. The sheep also were, with the aid of some imported and John Murray rams, very greatly improved. Canowie rams, under Goode's management, secured the highest prices at Adelaide, Melbourne, and Sydney sales, and Canowie sheep at the Adelaide show took 22 out of 32 prizes, including five cups, all the first, and every prize for ewes in one year. During this time selected flock rams worth £24,000 were sold off Canowie in one year. As many as 72,000 sheep were shorn there, and in one year Canowie wool brought the highest price in the London market for both fleece and lambs' wool. During the great drought of 1865 Goode reared a fine bull at Canowie, which won the Champion prize at Adelaide, Melbourne, and Sydney shows. The sheep and cattle from the Canowie estate played an important part in the improvement of the flocks and herds of Queensland. Goode was the first to get water by sinking bores on the Belalie Plains. Goode managed the station until December 1890. After leaving Canowie he was general manager for the estate of (the late) J. H. Angas for ten years, having charge of Hill River Station (which became his base station). From 1903 to 1907 he was in charge of the Petherton estate (which was then sold to the Government for closer settlement) and in 1906 he and two sons, Albert Powell Goode and Clarence Goode purchased Mintadloo station at Farrell's Flat six miles from Clare, and set about improving it.

Around 1898 Goode purchased "Bleak House" (built 1878) in Clare renamed "Ava Weanah" by the previous owner J.E. Bray. A later owner, Mrs. J. Christison, called it "Weroona". After retirement their home was at the corner of Fullarton Road and Ferguson Avenue, Fullarton; they maintained a farm at Loxton, South Australia. His home in 1916 was on Westall Street, Hyde Park.

== Family ==
Thomas's brothers included William Goode of Port Pirie, Henry Abel Goode (of Hyde Park), Benjamin Powell Goode (of Port Pirie), Charles Rufus Goode (of Port Pirie), and Matthew Goode (of Willunga).

Sir Charles Henry Goode, Samuel Goode, and Matthew Goode (of Matthew Goode and Co.) were cousins.

He married Margaret Wilson (8 January 1848 – 14 July 1927), daughter of the Rev. Matthew Wilson (a pioneer missionary in the Tongan Islands) on 11 September 1867. Their children included:

- Dr Arthur Goode (12 July 1871 – 24 April 1938) of Peterborough, South Australia (then Cleveland, Queensland) (see below)
- Albert Powell Goode (13 October 1873 – 9 September 1955) married Catharine Maud Cook (died 20 July 1952) of 15 February 1905. Her father William Cook was manager of Port Pirie branch of Australian Wheat Board from 1941. Albert was an unsuccessful candidate in the January 1912 election for the Assembly seat of Flinders.
- Clarence Goode (17 August 1875 – 30 April 1969) was Commissioner of Crown Lands in the Vaughan administration.
- Evelyn Maria Goode (14 April 1877 – 2 November 1927) married the Hon. Crawford Vaughan, Premier of South Australia on 8 June 1906. She was, as Evelyn Goode, the author of Childhood of Helen and Days that Speak. She was an active member of the Women's Non-Party Association, and was appointed an OBE in 1920.
- Lillian Goode (also reported as Lilian) (11 July 1879 – ) married Norman A(lexander) Smith (6 January 1877 – 24 December 1944) on 16 June 1904. Norman, son of Edwin Mitchell Smith, was later secretary of a number of gold mining companies, notably Blue Bird mine, of Norseman, Western Australia with offices in Bowman Chambers.
- Olive Margaret Goode (20 September 1880 – ) married Frederick Green on 2 May 1919; moved to New Farm, Brisbane
- Cecil Herbert Goode (17 October 1882 – 1960) married Frances I. "Dot" Sawers on 10 April 1906, lived at Wayville. Cecil, Milton and Malvern went into business as "Goode Brothers, Sheaoak Hills", sheep farmers, in Terowie, South Australia; partnership dissolved in July 1909. He was later appointed as Inspector of Pastoral Leases.
- (Thomas) Milton Goode (15 December 1884 – ) married Grace Ellen Hazard on 22 February 1910. Grace was president of the Adelaide Travellers Aid Society in 1912. They moved to Queensland.
- Malvern Clifton Goode (25 October 1886 – March 1970) married Frances Berkeley on 25 June 1910. Moved to Windsor, Queensland (Brisbane). Goode had a career cotton growing in Queensland, then as Commonwealth Superintendent of Agriculture in the Northern Territory.
- Vera Eleanor Goode (10 January 1889 – ) married Richard Kirkhouse Jenkins, of Wirraminna station
- Edna Kathleen Millicent Goode (21 December 1890 – 10 March 1977) served in Egypt in WWI from 1916 to 1918 as an Army nurse https://www.aif.adfa.edu.au/showPerson?pid=113780 She married Dr. William Foster Simmons (9 May 1888 – 5 May 1985) on 11 November 1919, and moved to Bexley then to Vaucluse, New South Wales in 1966. Simmons also served as a doctor in WWI https://discoveringanzacs.naa.gov.au/browse/records/360568 . He was controversially a director of Medical Benefits Fund of Australia and held office in the A.M.A. and its predecessor, the B.M.A.

=== Arthur Goode ===
Dr. Arthur Goode (12 July 1871 – 24 April 1938) was a son of Thomas and Margaret Goode. and was born at Canowie Station, of which his father was manager for 35 years. He was educated at Glenelg Grammar School and at Adelaide University where he qualified MB, BS in 1894. He was a fine athlete and played football for South Adelaide; a "brilliant winger" was one opinion. He was musically talented and composed at least one song, "Ready", published 1914 to critical indifference by Cawthorne and Co. He was House Surgeon at Adelaide Hospital in 1895. One of his last public mentions in connection with Adelaide Hospital was in December 1895 as chief witness at the inquest of a man who died under anaesthetic. The following February he was in Norseman, Western Australia. and was elected town councillor in April In December 1897 he was convicted of acts of gross indecency and sentenced to four years' jail.

In October 1899 he was appointed public vaccinator and in December was in Terowie, where he was appointed health officer, and then around 1912 moved to Petersburg (Peterborough) before enlisting for active service as Captain with the Australian Army Medical Corps, AIF in February 1916 and left Australia in April. He was in Egypt for a few months, and then was sent to England as medical officer at Codford, a training camp on Salisbury Plain. He left for Rouen, France in April 1917, then was attached to the hospital at Abbeville. An attack of bronchial catarrh followed by chronic bronchitis necessitated his return to England in May 1918, and he was appointed as one of the medical officers at Horseferry Road. In March 1919 he was repatriated to South Australia and resumed practice at Peterborough, where he took a prominent part in the installation of its Soldiers' Memorial Hospital. He was however, still troubled with ill-health, and he found it necessary to go to the milder climate of Queensland around 1928 He purchased a property at Cleveland, and acted as locum tenens in the surrounding districts and served as acting Government Medical Officer. He was instrumental in the establishment of a hospital at Mount Isa. He died after three months in Rosemount military hospital, Brisbane. In later years his chief recreations were gardening and music. Dr. Goode did not marry. He left his body to the Anatomy School, and a year after his death, the body was cremated at the Brisbane crematorium.

=== Evelyn Goode ===
Evelyn Maria Goode (14 April 1877 – 3 November 1927) was born at Canowie station, the eldest daughter of Thomas Goode. She was educated at Canowie and Norwood Girls' College. Subsequently the family removed to Adelaide, and settled at Fullarton. There she commenced a literary and a political career. She had a large number of short stories published in Australian periodicals, and as "Evelyn Goode" had two books published by Ward, Lock and Co: Days that Speak: A story of Australian child life. in 1908, which received favourable reviews. and a follow-up in 1913, The Childhood of Helen Her political activities included support for single tax, as espoused by A. T. Saunders, prison reform, and abolition of capital punishment

She married Crawford Vaughan on 8 June 1906 and continued her involvement with politics, frequently addressing public meetings. During the war years, she involved herself in recruiting, and inaugurated a well-known system of window badges, where crosses indicated the number of volunteers from that particular dwelling. Throughout Mr. Vaughan's Parliamentary career, she was his assistant, and once addressed a gathering in his absence. She also accompanied her husband to America.

She was awarded an O.B.E in 1920 in recognition of her patriotic efforts during World War I. She died at Thornleigh, New South Wales on 2 November 1927 after a long illness, leaving her husband and one daughter, of 18 years of age.
