= D. & W. Murray Limited =

Australian wholesale drapery business

D. & W. Murray was a drapers shop in Adelaide founded by brothers David Murray and William Mackintosh Murray, which became the wholesale draper D. & W. Murray Limited, with warehouses in three states, then Goode, Durrant & Murray second in importance only to G. & R. Wills.

== History ==
The Murray brothers were born in Anstruther, Scotland, sons of William Murray. They had some experience in the retail and wholesale drapery trade, which included supplying retailers in the young colony of South Australia. In early 1853 the brothers arrived in Adelaide, and began operating a retail drapery store in what had been H. D. Hilton's printing shop on King William Street, "a few doors from Hindley Street". with access on Gilbert Place.

By 1858 they had moved to larger premises at "Cohen's Corner" (later T & G Building), on the south corner of King William and Grenfell streets, previously "Prince's crockery shop". They needed a warehouse to support their burgeoning wholesale trade, so took over the adjoining King William Street building, which had been Monteith & Muirhead's wheat store until that company was found insolvent in 1860. It was not long before two storeys were added to the building, for which they ran foul of the council, as the walls were not 15 inches (380 mm) thick as their regulations stipulated. The company had two arms: wholesale and retail. Seeing their strengths and opportunities lay in the wholesale, they sold their retail business in February 1862 to James Whiting.

In May 1866 William Murray left for England to take over their London office, whose premises were in Fenchurch Building, the Barbican, then from 1890 at 28 Finsbury Street. Apart from a few short visits he never returned to Australia.

They had a store on Grenfell Street, near King William Street, which in 1872 became a suite of offices for Francis Clark and Sons and the basement a wine cellar for the related firm of Clark & Crompton.

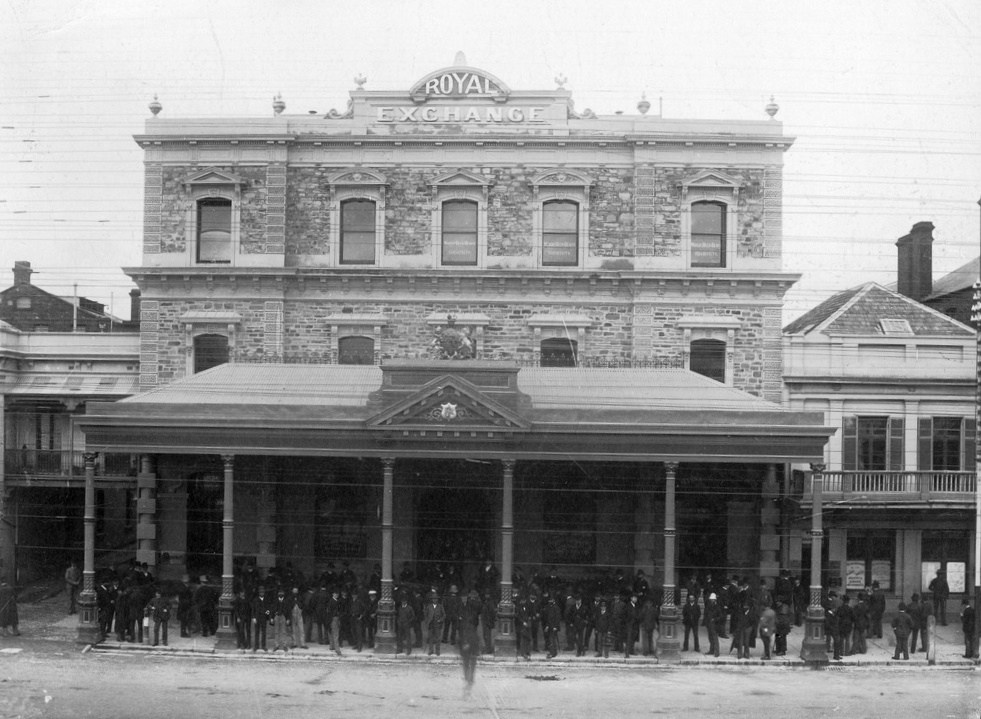
Royal Exchange, King William Street between Grenfell and Pirie streets

In April 1867 they took over the lease on Levi & Watt's newly built warehouse at 96 King William Street (previously the site of Coglin's woodyard, and now the Commonwealth Bank). The property had been passed in at auction, and purchased by Philip Santo for an English investor. By September the move had been effected and their old building taken over by auctioneer Louis Barnard. In February 1868 a serious fire destroyed most of the stock, but prompt action by the hose units prevented it spreading to the Napoleon Bonaparte Hotel adjacent.

In 1884 they sold the hundred-year lease to the Commercial Bank of South Australia which however failed in February 1886, and the lease was purchased by John Robb of Melbourne, who had it renovated as the Royal Exchange, with rooms for Stock Exchange of Adelaide, the Stock Exchange of South Australia and the Commercial Stock Exchange of Adelaide. The architects were Wright, Reed & Beaver.
A problem arose with crowds of speculators blocking the entrance; removing the veranda failed to solve the problem, so Robb reopened the old Pirie Street exchange (which he also owned). By July 1891 there were no stock exchanges at the Royal Exchange building.

See also: Green's Exchange for more information on Adelaide's stock exchanges

They built a new five-storey warehouse in Gawler Place; opened February 1886 Behind this building they had a box store on the site of the present stock exchange building on McHenry Street. This was left to David Murray by landlord Dr. George Louis John McHenry (18 September 1834 – 9 May 1890), by the terms of his Will, which left his properties acre lots 168 (west of Freeman Street/Gawler Place) and 169 (next west) to their respective tenants.

The Adelaide Boot Factory was founded by Murray on Park Terrace, Unley around 1870 and was still producing footwear at the same location for Goode Durrant & Murray in 1954.

In April 1897 the company became D. & W. Murray Limited, with a paid-up capital of £500,000.

By 1913 the company had warehouses in Adelaide, London, Melbourne, Brisbane (Creek and Elizabeth streets), Townsville (Sturt Street), Perth (Murray and Barrack streets), Hobart (Murray Street), Launceston (Patterson Street) and Sydney (Market and York streets).

In 1934 Goode, Durrant & Company, acquired the South Australian, West Australian, and Broken Hill businesses of D. & W. Murray Ltd., and the former company's name was changed to Goode, Durrant & Murray, Ltd. D. & W. Murray Ltd. continued to operate in London and other States.

The Gawler Place warehouse was left vacant until occupied rent-free by the Red Cross Society from 1940 "for the duration of the War", when up to 200 volunteers were engaged on the Society's work, until 1946 when the building was sold to Savery's Pianos, and the Red Cross purchased Matthew Goode & Co.'s old warehouse at Stephens Place for its new headquarters.

== Personnel ==
Some notable members of the company were:

- David Murray MP (28 December 1829 – 6 January 1907), co-founder of the company. On 9 May 1856 he married Rebecca Godfrey, of Rockford, Ireland; they had one child, a son who died young. He was an active supporter of the Presbyterian Church, YMCA and the School of Mines. He was a member of the House of Assembly for East Adelaide 1870–1871, East Torrens 1877–1878 and Yatala April–June 1881. He was a member of the Legislative Council 1882–1891.
- William Mackintosh Murray (c. 1831 – 25 November 1920) married Helen Morrison Cumming ( – c. 1911), daughter of John Cumming of Morphett Vale in 1857. They had a daughter Helen Mackintosh Murray on 17 August 1862, a daughter Louisa and a son W. A. Murray, in business with the firm. In May 1866 he returned to England to take control of their purchasing office.
- Robert Knowles (1839–1917) with the firm in 1858–1915, made a partner c. 1885, and served as manager of the Melbourne office. He was elected president of the SA Sunday School Union 1893. His son Harry M. Knowles (1873–1907) was also with the company.
- James Martin (c. 1844–1915) was with the firm 1855–1907, partner from c. 1885, head of the London buying staff, married Margaret Loutit in 1866, died in England.
- Aldam Murr Pettinger (July 1859 – 1950) was with the firm 1875–1925, and head of the Manchester department. He represented South Australia in four sports: football, cricket, baseball, and bowls and excelled in several others. He married Mary Elizabeth Walters in 1892.
