= Currency Creek Game Reserve =

Protected area in South Australia

- IUCN category VI (protected area with sustainable use of natural resources)
- Location within South Australia
- Location: South Australia
- Nearest city: Goolwa
- Coordinates: 35°29′04″S 138°50′23″E
- Area: 1.28 km^{2} (0.49 sq mi)
- Established: 19 June 1975
- Governing body: Department for Environment and Water

Currency Creek Game Reserve is a protected area in the Australian state of South Australia located on the south-western side of Lake Alexandrina in the gazetted localities of Currency Creek and Goolwa North about 0.5 kilometres (0.31 miles) north-east of Goolwa.

The game reserve occupies land in sections 309 and 458 in the cadastral unit of the Hundred of Nangkita and section 425 in the Hundred of Goolwa. It was proclaimed on 19 June 1975 under the National Parks and Wildlife Act 1972 in respect to sections 309 and 425. Section 458 was added on 27 May 1976.

In 1980, the game reserve was described as follows:

The margins of Lake Alexandrina provide suitable habitat for many species of waterbirds including grebes, crakes and rails, ibis, spoonbills and ducks. Currency Creek Game Reserve is such an environment and is reserved for the management and conservation of waterfowl, particularly native game species. Duck shooting is permitted during open seasons... Currency Creek Game Reserve is represented by two small marshy islands in the mouth of Currency Creek. Much of the Reserve is open waters but there is a significant area of samphire species (Tecticornia), Atriplex paludosa low shrubland and some Phragmites australis - Typha spp herbland.

The game reserve is classified as an IUCN Category VI protected area. In 1980, it was listed on the now-defunct Register of the National Estate.

== See also ==
- Duck hunting in South Australia
- List of islands within the Murray River in South Australia
