= Currency Creek Arboretum =

Arboretum in South Australia

- Interactive map of Currency Creek Arboretum
- Type: Eucalypt arboretum
- Location: Currency Creek, South Australia
- Coordinates: 35°27′15.10″S 138°45′39.12″E
- Area: 32 ha (79 acres)
- Created: 1992
- Operator: Private
- Open: By appointment only
- Website: http://www.dn.com.au/index.html

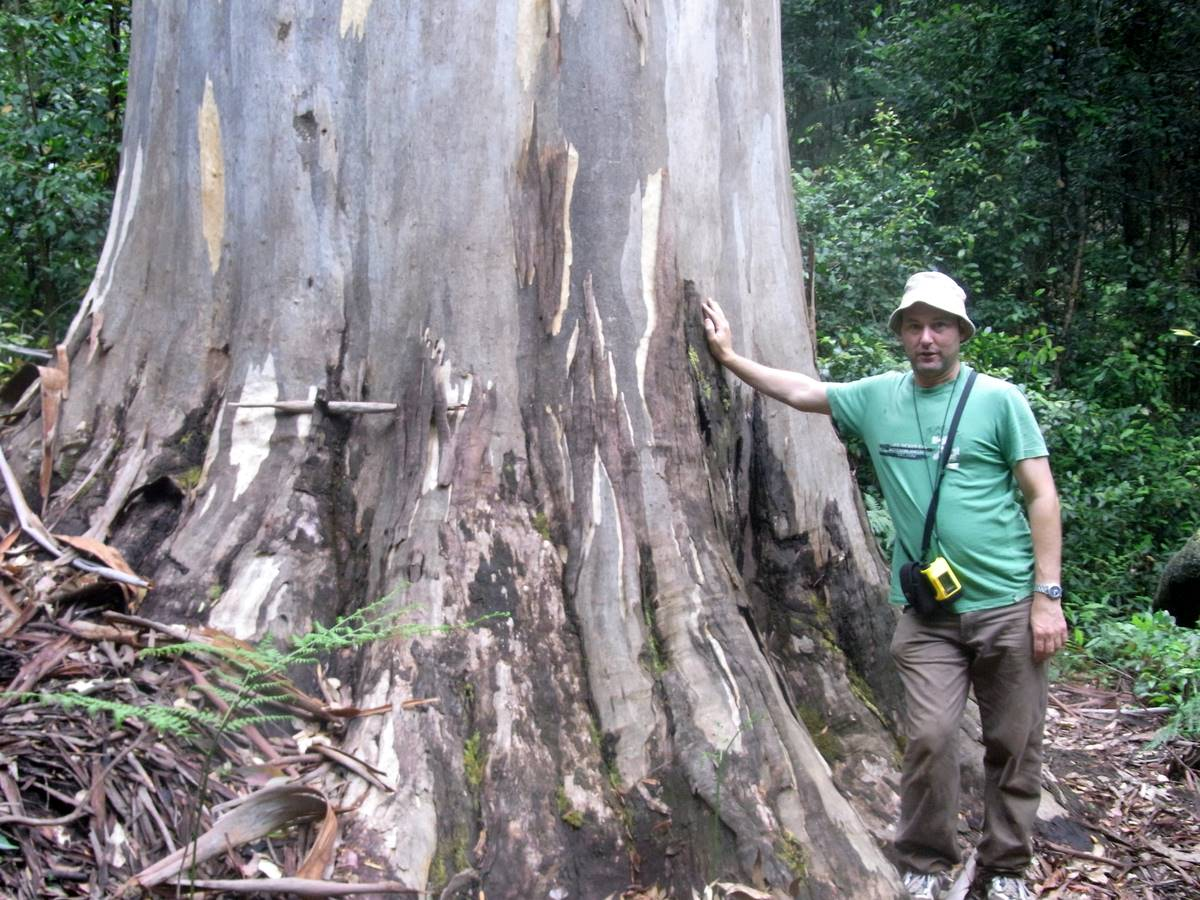
Dean Nicolle and Eucalyptus deanei

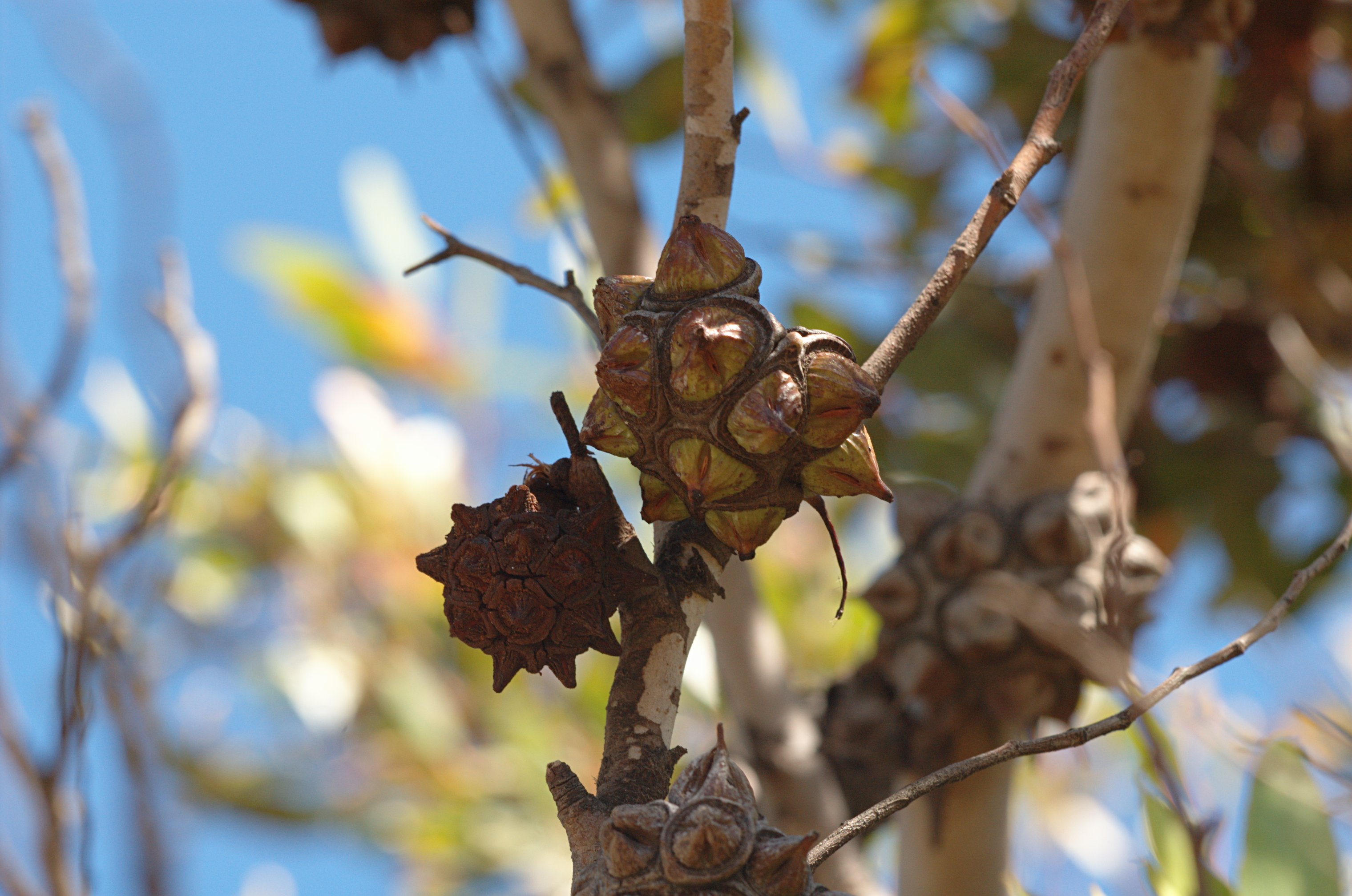
Eucalyptus conferruminata

"I wanted a site that had no trees on it. The soil here is well drained and a sandy loam. There is no limestone on the site so it allows me to grow all the species that aren't too tolerant of limestone, or alkaline soils. The rainfall is relatively low -around 450mm annually. That allows me to grow many desert species, a lot of the temperate species, and also the higher rainfall species, with irrigation." (Dr. Dean Nicolle, 2007)

—

The Currency Creek Arboretum (CCA; or Currency Creek Arboretum Eucalypt Research Centre) is located in the Australian state of South Australia near the small town of Currency Creek and south of the state capital of Adelaide. CCA is a 32-hectare (79-acre) specialist Eucalypt arboretum and research centre, composed solely of Australian native plants.

Privately owned and operated, CCA is open by appointment only and does not charge entry fees. Run by volunteers, there is no paid staff.

== History ==
Dr. Dean Nicolle began looking for land between Mount Compass and Strathalbyn in 1990 to create an arboretum. The specific soil type he was looking for had to be well-drained, limestone-free, and with a neutral or slightly acidic pH. CCA was established in 1992. The site has a Mediterranean climate with 450 mm (18 in) annual rainfall.

The first seed plantings of 18 eucalypts occurred in 1993. All seed collection points were marked with a GPS location and an herbarium voucher. Using trial and error in choosing planting distance, some trees that were initially planted too close are being replanted.

== Collection ==
The eucalypt collection includes 1,000 species and subspecies, with over 8,000 trees. including Eucalyptus, Angophora and Corymbia. Each species is grouped in fours.

== Research ==
Research activities includes eucalypt conservation, cultivation, ecology, physiology, systematics, and taxonomy. Additional research consists of the cut flower industry and honey production, as well as tree use, such as firewood, shade, and windbreaks.

== See also ==
- List of botanical gardens in Australia
