= Her Majesty's Theatre, Adelaide =

Historic theatre and arts venue

Her Majesty's Theatre
- New Tivoli Theatre; Tivoli Theatre; Prince of Wales Theatre; Opera Theatre
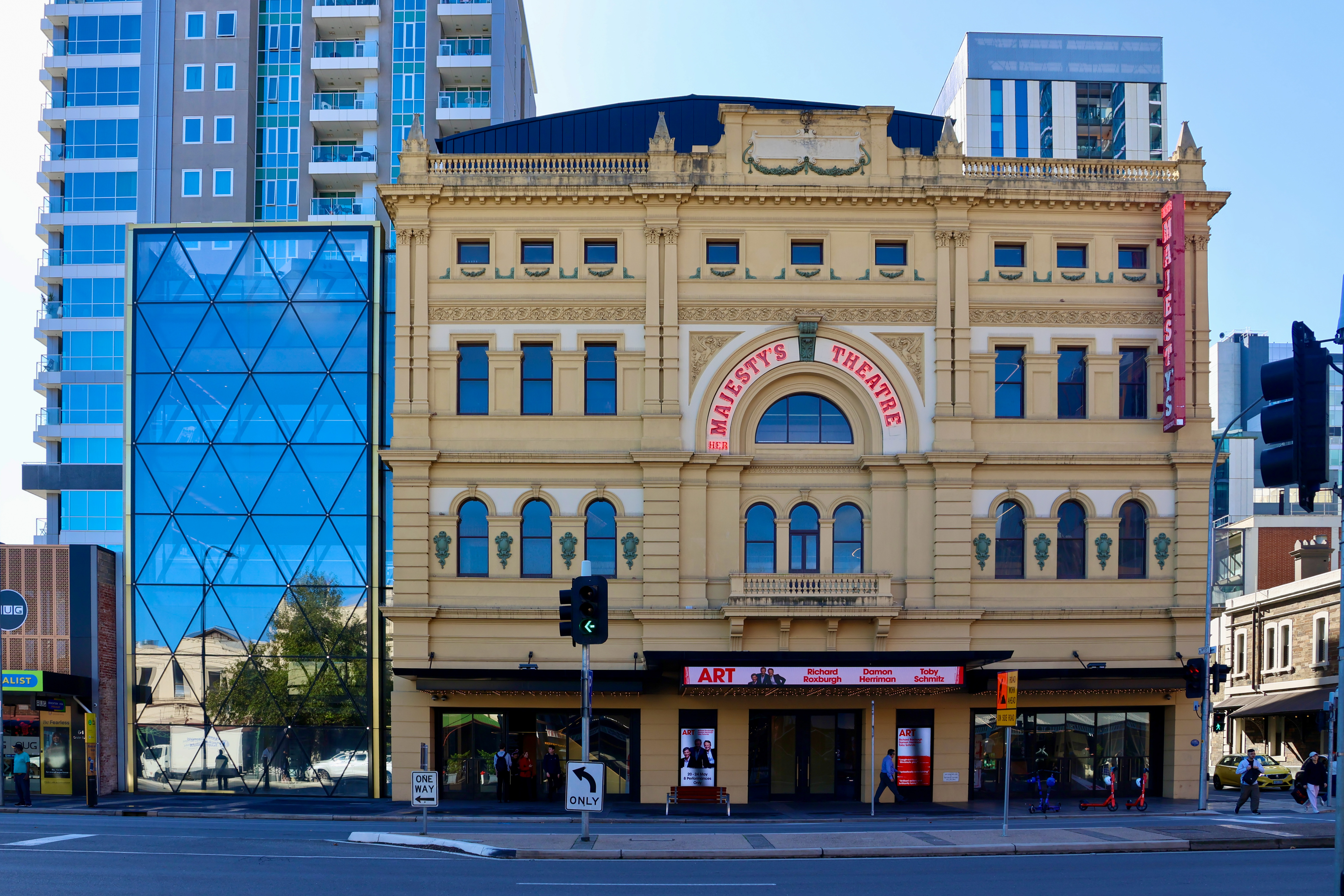
- The theatre in 2026
- Interactive map of Her Majesty's Theatre
- Address: Grote Street; Adelaide, South Australia; Australia
- Coordinates: 34°55′42″S 138°35′49″E
- Owner: Adelaide Festival Centre Trust
- Capacity: 1,467
- Type: Performing arts centre

Construction
- Opened: 5 September 1913
- Renovated: 2018–20
- Architect: David Williams and Charles Thomas Good

Website
- www.adelaidefestivalcentre.com.au/venues/her-majestys-theatre/

Her Majesty's Theatre is a theatre in Adelaide, South Australia, located on Grote Street, originally built in 1913 as the New Tivoli Theatre. Other names through its history have been the Princess Theatre (before it was first opened), the Prince of Wales Theatre, Tivoli Theatre and the Opera Theatre.

It re-opened in June 2020 after a major refurbishment.

== History ==
=== 20th century ===
Designed by Adelaide-born architects David Williams and Charles Thomas Good, the foundation stone for the Princess Theatre was laid on 14 October 1912. However, after it was built in 1913, it opened as the New Tivoli Theatre, part of national Tivoli vaudeville circuit, and is the only original Tivoli still standing. The opening ceremony was presided over by Mayor John Lavington Bonython on 5 September 1913.

Its first music director was Will Quintrell, before he moved to the Tivoli, Melbourne.

The theatre was renamed the Prince of Wales Theatre in 1920, and back to the Tivoli Theatre in 1930.

In 1954 it was acquired by J. C. Williamson's, but it was very dilapidated by the end of the Adelaide Festival season in March/April 1962, so the owners undertook a complete refurbishment of the interiors, costing £300,000. The dress circle was removed in order to create a feeling of greater intimacy, and seating capacity reduced to approximately 1200. The orchestra pit was enlarged, and panels built over it to improve acoustics, and air conditioning was installed. Heritage features were stripped, replaced by plastic and anodised aluminium décor. The external walls were painted grey. It reopened on 9 November 1962 by premier Sir Thomas Playford as Her Majesty's Theatre, with a performance by J. C. Williamson Theatres themselves of The Mikado by Gilbert and Sullivan. It then staged ballets, opera and plays.

After suffering financially from the drop in attendances after the introduction of television in Australia television in 1956, it was saved by the Dunstan government in 1976 when it was purchased by the state government for the State Opera of South Australia, and redecorated in 1920s style, with a colour scheme of cream and burgundy. The acoustics were improved, new air conditioning installed, and private box seats added. It was renamed the Opera Theatre upon its reopening on 12 March 1979, with Die Fledermaus performed by the State Opera.

Its present name dates from 31 August 1988.

=== 21st century: major redevelopment ===
Her Majesty's Theatre closed in 2018 to undergo a two-year, $66-million major redevelopment. The heritage facade and eastern wall were preserved, but everything else removed, creating space for a redeveloped larger theatre. The project included expanding into the lot next door, increasing the size of the stage and auditorium, returning grand circle seating, and improving accessibility and facilities front of house and backstage. The redevelopment was designed by Adelaide-based COX Architecture and built by Hansen Yuncken, managed by the South Australian Department of Planning, Transport and Infrastructure and Adelaide Festival Centre Trust.

The new Her Majesty's Theatre opened on 12 June 2020. The theatre was unveiled by Douglas Gautier AM, Adelaide Festival Centre CEO and artistic director. Uncle Mickey Kumatpi Marrutya O'Brien, a senior Kaurna and Narungga man, marked the official completion with a Welcome to Country and smoking ceremony.

The redeveloped theatre features a 1467-seat auditorium over three levels. The grand circle was rebuilt, after an absence of 50 years. Two curving staircases in the expanded main foyer and other features retain some of the original Edwardian-era Art Nouveau elements, including a pressed metal ceiling, elegant architraves and mouldings. Other features include custom-built curved timber balcony fronts in the auditorium, foyer bars on all three levels, a larger backstage rehearsal room and a huge glass façade to the new west wing.

The theatre's "signature wall", formerly in the basement, was deconstructed and reinstalled brick by brick in a central position backstage. The wall is covered with signatures from visiting stars, including Julie Anthony, Rowan Atkinson, Lauren Bacall, Alan Cumming, and Barry Humphries. On the floors of each foyer level, brass tiles are engraved with the names of some of the notable stars who have performed at the theatre over the past 100 years.

Accessibility improvements include stair-free access to all levels and backstage areas and accessible seating on all levels.

== Governance ==
The theatre is managed by a statutory authority, the Adelaide Festival Centre Trust, and owned by this entity since it was bought from Arts SA for A$8 million in July 2017. The Trust borrowed A$62 million from the South Australian Government Financing Authority for a maximum term of 10 years to fund a major redevelopment.

== Architects ==
David Williams (1856–1940) and Charles Thomas Good (1864–1926) were brothers-in-law; the latter was the son of merchant Thomas Good, and Williams married his sister, Annie Good (1859–1942), in 1884. Their practice was called Williams & Good.

Apart from the Tivoli, they also designed several other prominent buildings in Adelaide, including:

- Majestic Theatre
- King's Theatre
- James Marshall & Co.'s emporium (1908; later Myers)
- Wayville Baptist Church

David Williams was born on 31 May 1856. He was born and trained in South Australia, was one of the first generation of architects to do so. He was a co-founder of the South Australian Institute of Architects in 1886, and was president from 1911 to 1913. During this time he called on the South Australian Government to hold design competitions for large public buildings, and the SAIA also became an allied member of the Royal Institute of British Architects. He died on 29 August 1940.
