= George Bain Johnston =

Scottish-born trade pioneer in South Australia

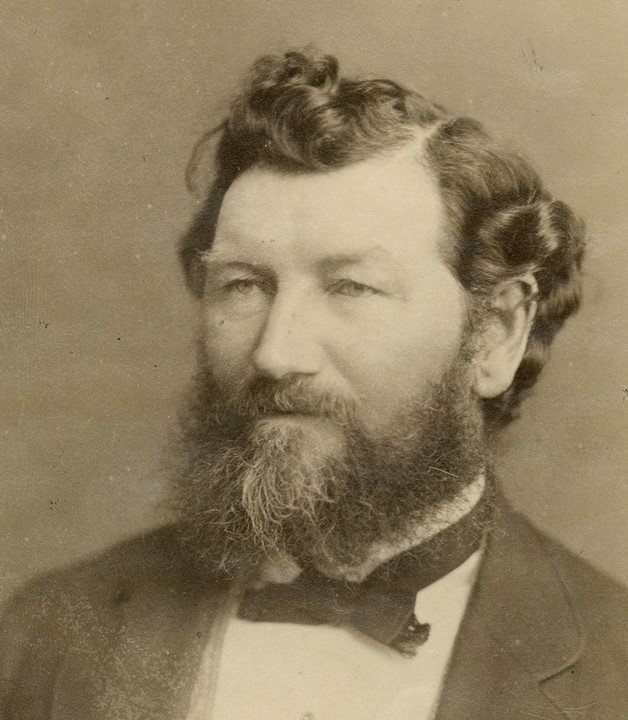

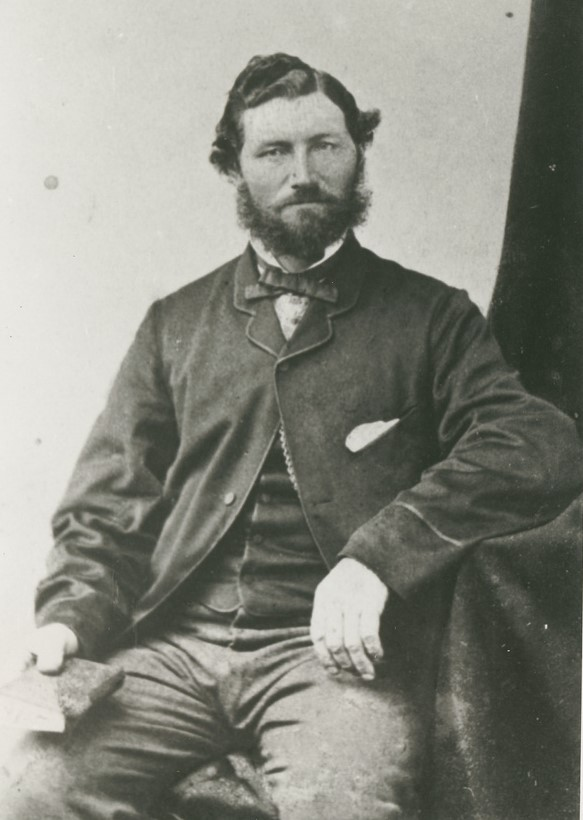

George Bain Johnston (28 November 1829 – 29 May 1882) was a pioneer of the Murray River trade in South Australia.

== History ==
George Bain Johnston was born at Cockenzie, in the county of Haddington, Scotland, and was educated at Steel's Hospital in the parish of Tranent. At the age of 15 he served an apprenticeship on the schooner Mary Donaldson, under Captain James Donaldson, in the employ of Captain Hew (or Hugh) Francis Cadell (c. 1790 – 27 April 1873). He was one of a group of Scotsmen who left Scotland in 1853 as one of the crew of the Lioness, a small River Mersey steamer of 70 tons register, which was purchased by Cadell to be used for towing purposes in Port Melbourne. The vessel was rigged as a three-masted schooner in Scotland and sailed out to Melbourne. Other members of the crew of the Lioness, all associated with the opening of the Murray, were James Ritchie, Thomas Johnston, John Barclay, John McDonald, William Barker and John Ritchie. The four first named returned to Scotland for Captain Cadell in December 1853 in the Admiral, returning to Australia in 1854 in the brig Lady Emma, with the river steamers Gundagai and Albury in sections as freight. These vessels were assembled at Port Adelaide, and steamed through the Murray mouth. On 18 October 1857, the wives of these gentlemen left Scotland in the sailing ship Planter, arriving in Melbourne on 12 January 1858. The first vessel to come alongside to welcome these lady pioneers was the Lioness, the little craft that had left Scotland four years previously with the husbands of all the members of the party. These ladies had booked their passages in the Great Britain, but prior to sailing this vessel was commandeered by the British authorities for service as a troop ship in connection with the Indian mutiny.

Johnston joined the rush to the gold diggings at Forest Creek and in 1853 joined Hew's son Captain Francis Cadell, the River Murray pioneer, and moved to Goolwa, where in 1857 he purchased a plot of land in "Little Scotland" and built a substantial dwelling "Cockenzie House". His first expedition was to take a survey of the Murray from Wentworth downwards in a small boat – the Quiz – recording obstacles that lay in the river. His next trip was with Captain Cadell in the steamer Lady Augusta. In 1855 he was appointed captain of the steamer Albury, and was the first to reach the town of Albury. The residents celebrated his arrival with a banquet and presented him with a purse of one hundred sovereigns, with which a suitable cup was bought and engraved to commemorate the occasion. After continuing in this trade for some years he joined Charles Murphy as "Johnston & Murphy", and purchased the Moolgewanke (the boat with which he explored the Edward River, and which came to a terrible end) from Cadell, and soon afterwards the Albury. They prospered and became substantial steamboat proprietors and traders on the Murray and its tributaries. In 1862 they built the stern-wheeler Maranoa. In 1863 Capt. Johnston returned to Scotland to superintend the building of a paddle steamer, the Murray, which was brought out under canvas by Richard Barry, Capt. Johnston returning via Melbourne. This boat proved unsuitable, and was sold to Gippsland Lakes traders. In 1873 the partnership was dissolved, and Capt. Johnston traded alone. In 1877 he again returned to his homeland to build a suitable steamer – the well-known Queen of the South which did good service during the busy season of 1878–1879. On his arrival at Goolwa he was presented with a handsome silver epergne. Another large steamer was built at Goolwa, the Cadell, the engines of which were brought from Scotland in the Queen of the South. Johnston then constructed his last vessel, the Monarch, said to have the largest carrying capacity of any boat on the rivers. During the last few years business was carried on in partnership with Mr. Kirkpatrick of Wilcannia as Geo. Johnston & Co. He died at Queenstown, New Zealand, where he had travelled in the hope of respite after a considerable period of ill health. His body was returned to Australia in a lead coffin and interred at Currency Creek, South Australia

== Character ==
Captain Johnston was described as one of the Murray's most successful navigators, and a loyal, intelligent, and enterprising colonist. He was a strong swimmer, and was reckoned to have saved from drowning no less than fourteen lives, among them a Mrs. Padman and her daughter, and was honored with a medal from the Royal Humane Society. He was a Christian, and was associated with the Wesleyan Church from its infancy at Goolwa, and was a most enthusiastic and energetic worker in all its activities.

== Family ==
In 1852 he married Elizabeth Barclay (c. 1831 – 25 September 1920), daughter of James Barclay, of Cockenzie, Scotland, who came out to Australia in 1858. She was closely associated with the Methodist Church. Elizabeth was sister of John Barclay of Mundoora, South Australia. Children of George and Elizabeth included:

- eldest son Peter George Johnston (c. 1859 – 2 June 1900) was a marine engineer, resident in Fremantle for many years.
- Hugh Francis Cadell Johnston (c. April 1862 – 21 December 1862)
- George (later Captain) Johnston (January 1864 – 18 September 1925) married Miriam Ottaway ( – ) on 22 February 1893, lived at Blanchetown. George captained the S.S. Cadell in the Spencer Gulf trade, and the Charles Sturt on the Murray. Miriam retired to Sturt Street, St. Leonards. Their son George "Blue" Johnston was a noted footballer.
- eldest daughter Elizabeth Marshall Johnston ( – 4 April 1951) married Henry Alfred "Harry" Wigzell (c. 1864 – 30 March 1929) on 31 March 1897. Home Alpha St. Kensington Park.
- Helen D. Johnston (c. 1870 – 10 January 1944) married David J. Byrnes (c. 1866 – 30 July 1951)
- John Bathgate Johnston (c. 1871 – 25 June 1944) married Lilian May "Milly" Goode ( – 26 October 1918), daughter of Benjamin P. Goode on 27 September 1894. They moved to Port Pirie. He married again, to Emily Marg "Millie" Windebank on 11 July 1921.
- James Charles Murphy "Jim" Johnston (c. 1872 – 21 December 1923) and his wife Mary moved to Port Pirie; he became a longtime employee of H. A. and W. Goode.
- Augusta "Gussie" Johnston (c. 1874 – 4 March 1921) married William C. Taverner of Middleton.

Peter Johnston, a brother, (1826 – 2 June 1881) died of exposure after falling from the steamer Cadell at the Goolwa wharf.
