= Currency Creek, South Australia =

Currency Creek South Australia
- Coordinates: 35°27′14″S 138°45′30″E
- Population: 443 (SAL 2021)
- Established: 1840 (town); 31 August 2000 (locality)
- Postcode(s): 5214
- Time zone: ACST (UTC+9:30)
  - Summer (DST): ACDT (UTC+10:30)
- LGA(s): Alexandrina Council
- Region: Fleurieu and Kangaroo Island
- County: Hindmarsh
- State electorate(s): Finniss
- Federal division(s): Mayo
Mean max temp	Mean min temp	Annual rainfall
20.8 °C; 69 °F	11.8 °C; 53 °F	394.8 mm 15.5 in
Localities around Currency Creek:
Tooperang	Tooperang; Finniss; Clayton Bay	Clayton Bay
Mosquito Hill	Currency Creek	Clayton Bay; Hindmarsh Island
Mosquito Hill; Middleton	Middleton; Goolwa; Goolwa North; Hindmarsh Island	Hindmarsh Island
- Footnotes: Adjoining localities

Currency Creek (postcode 5214) is a township and locality in South Australia on the western shore of Lake Alexandrina about 6 km north of Goolwa, beside a seasonal stream bearing the same name – Currency Creek – which flows into Lake Alexandrina. The locality includes the headland named Finniss Point which separates the mouths of Currency Creek and the Finniss River.

== History ==
Parts of Lake Alexandrina near to Currency Creek were initially explored by Charles Sturt in an open boat in 1830 but he did not sight the creek.

In December 1837, while exploring the Lake and Murray Mouth looking for other outlets to the sea, a party led by Thomas Bewes Strangways and Young Bingham Hutchinson discovered the waterway while using a whaleboat borrowed from the Encounter Bay fishery. The whaleboat, which in September 1837 had been sold off the schooner Currency Lass at Adelaide, bore the same name as its mother ship, and they named the creek in honour of this boat. They reported on the good grassland in the area and its potential for agriculture.

The township was surveyed in the Currency Creek Special Survey of 1840 but it never really thrived due to the nearness of Goolwa. During the later 1800s the district supported many market gardens along the fertile river flats. The Currency Creek Cemetery contains many historic gravestones. It is notably large compared to the township for the reason that it has serviced the entire district for well over a century.

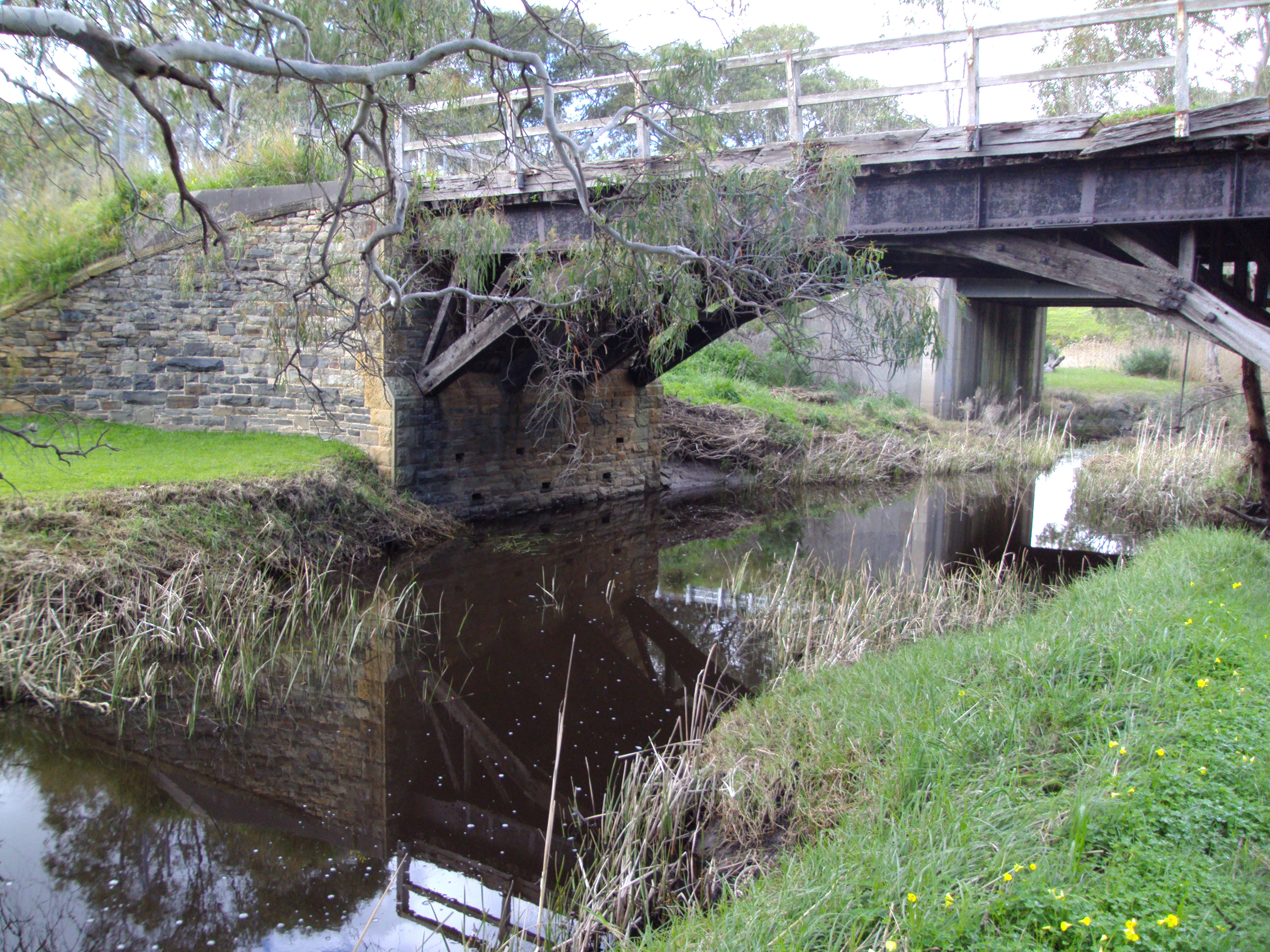
Heritage listed bridge across Currency Creek

Boundaries for the locality were created on 31 August 2000 for the "long established name" and include the Government Town of Currency Creek

== Wine industry ==
Currency Creek lends its name to a wine region that stretches from Port Elliot in the west, to Lake Alexandrina to the east, and includes Hindmarsh Island. The main grape varieties grown are Chardonnay, Sauvignon blanc, Cabernet Sauvignon and Shiraz. Vineyards were first established in the area in 1969, with the region producing its first vintage in 1972.

== Currency Creek Arboretum ==
The Currency Creek Arboretum is named after the nearby geographical feature and town. Founded privately by Dean Nicolle and supported by volunteers, it is being developed as a specialist eucalypt (Angophora, Eucalyptus and Corymbia) arboretum with its main purpose being research into Australia's most dominant natural group of plants, the eucalypts.

== See also ==
- Currency Creek Game Reserve
- Scott Conservation Park
- Scott Keach

== Gallery ==
Memorials to River Murray pioneers at Currency Creek cemetery include:

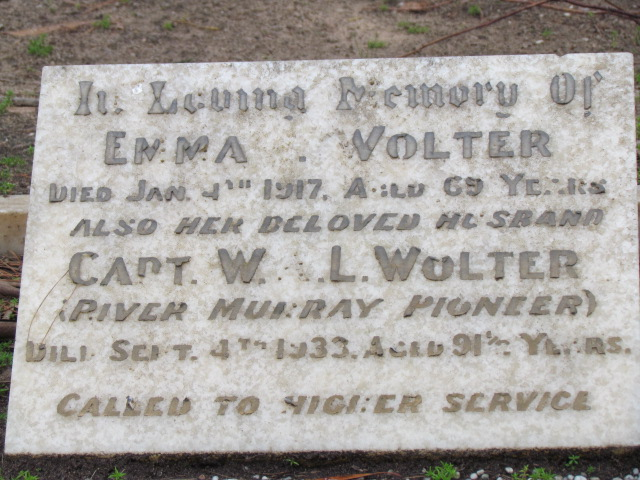
Captain Wolter

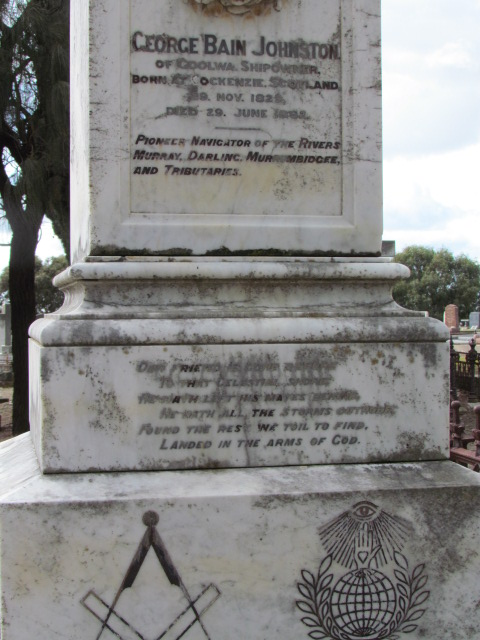
Captain Johnston

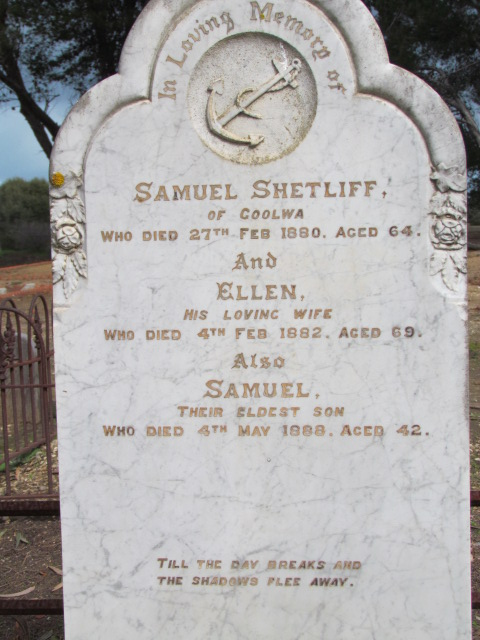
Captain Shetliff

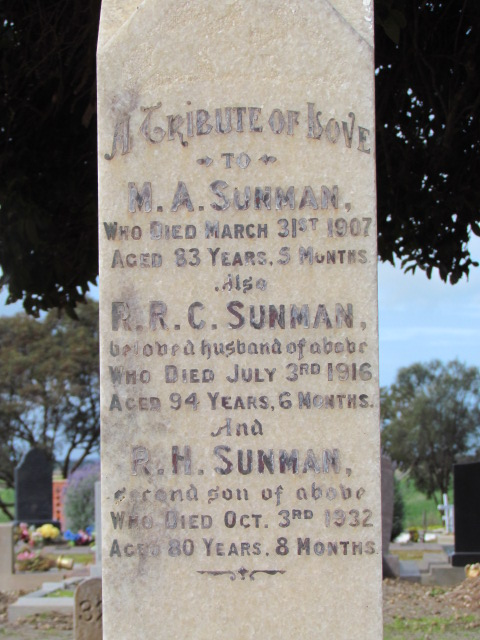
Captain Sunman

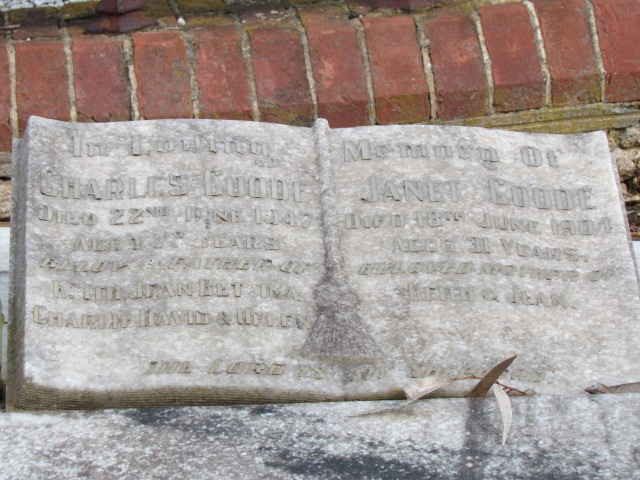
Charles Goode

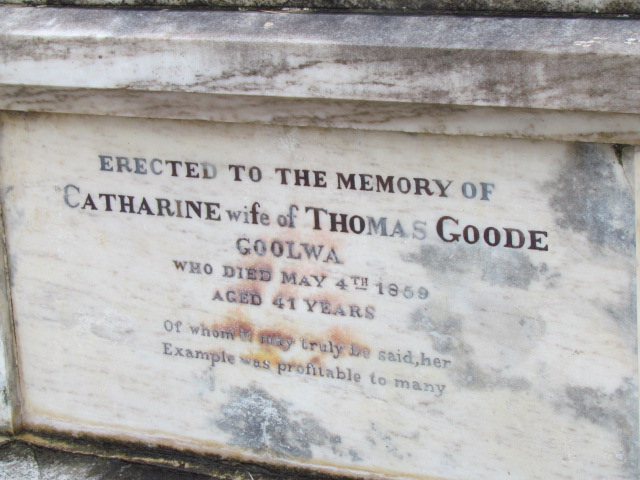
Catharine Goode

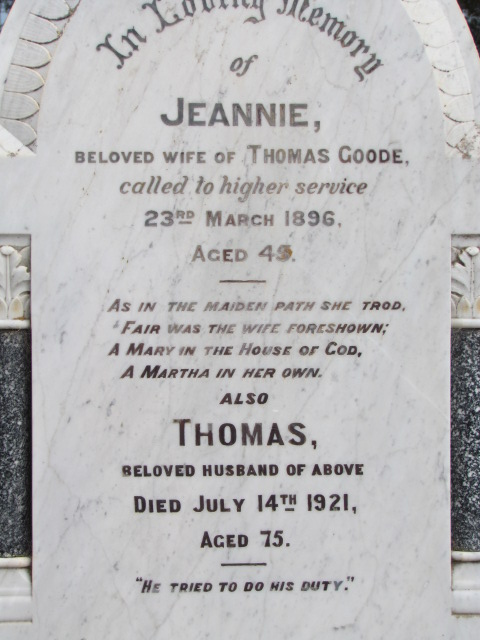
Jeannie Goode

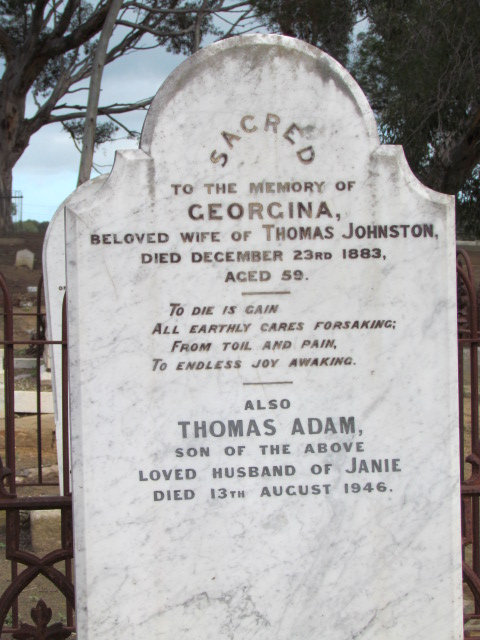
Georgina Johnston

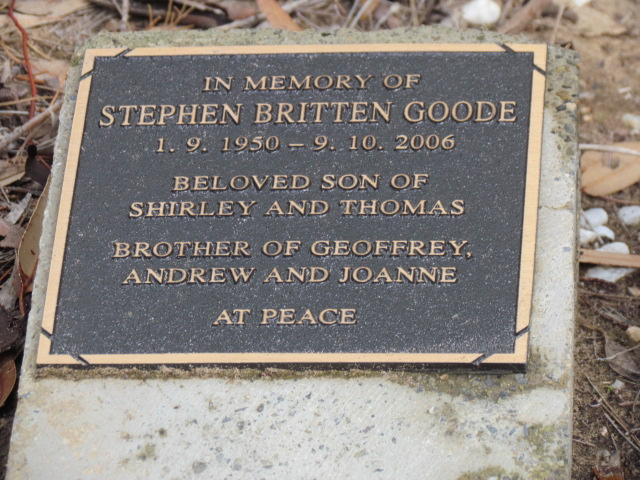
Stephen Goode

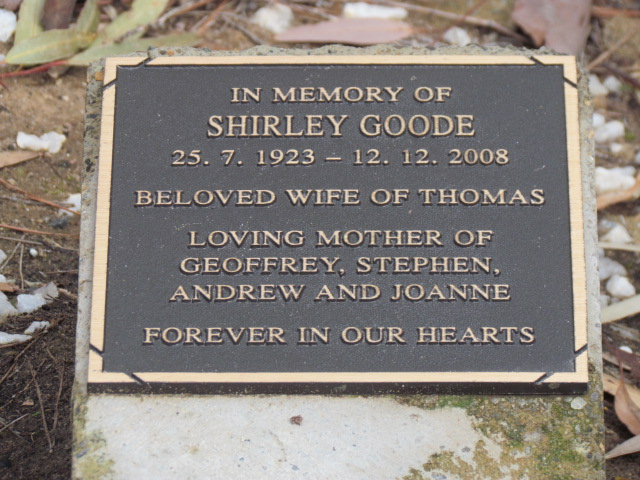
Shirley Goode

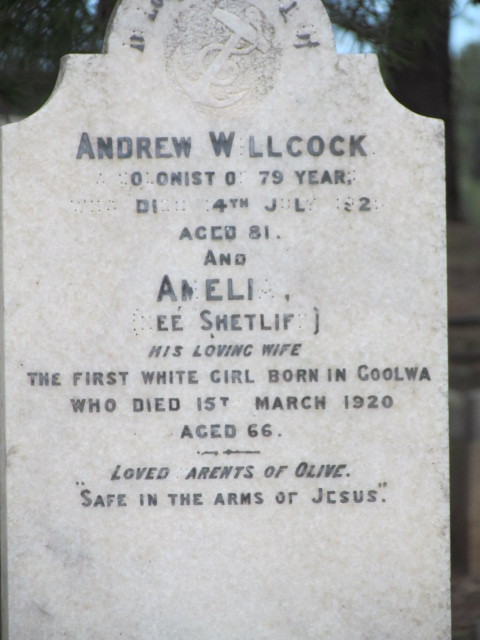
Andrew Willcock

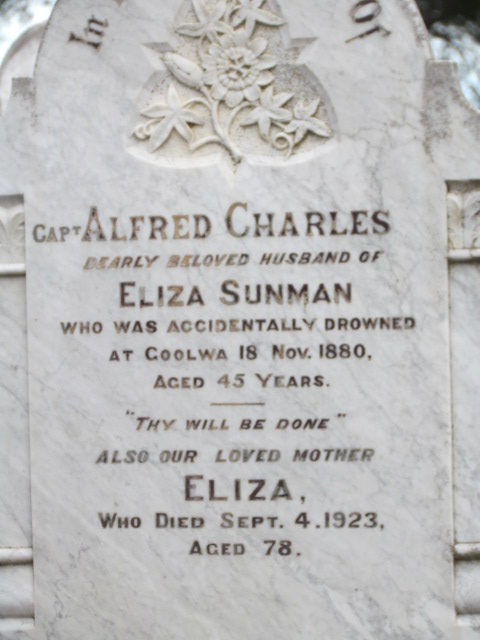
Captain Sunman

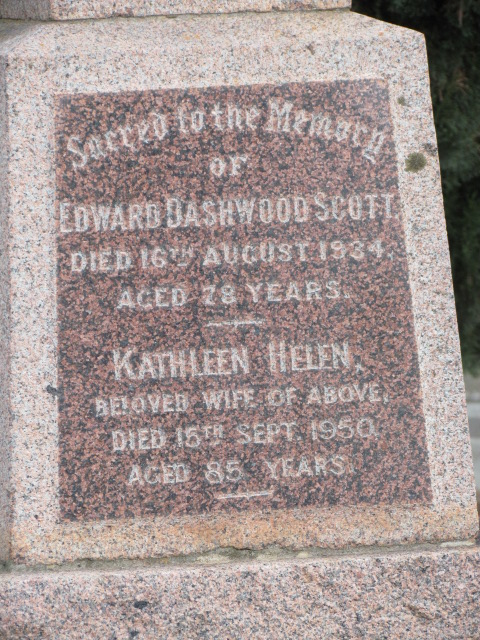
Edward Dashwood Scott

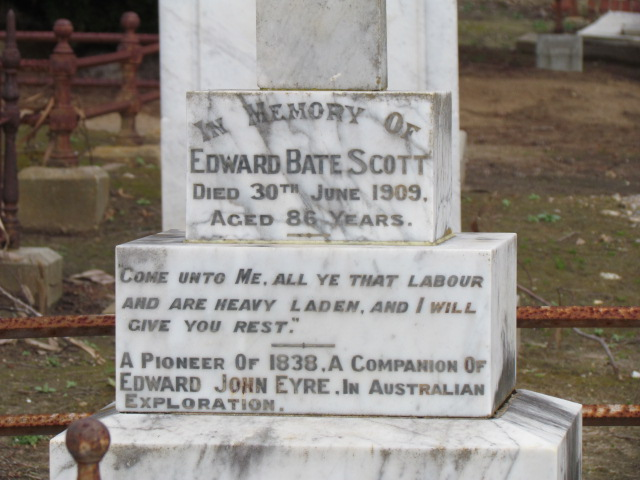
Edward Bate Scott

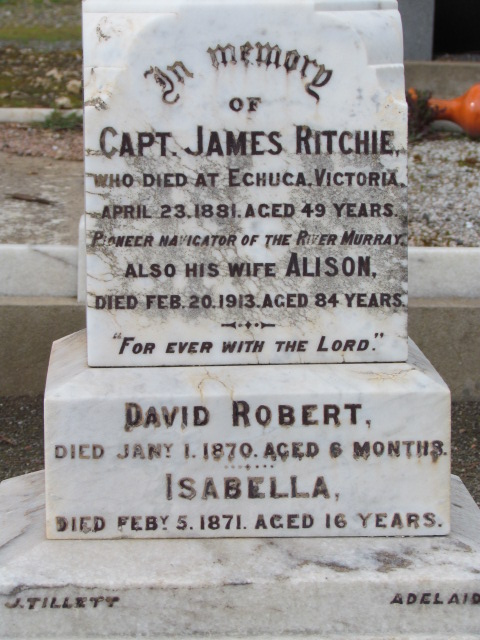
Capt. Ritchie

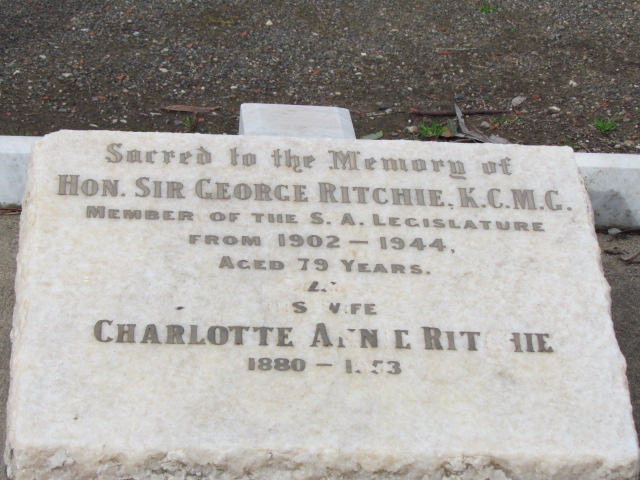
Sir George Ritchie

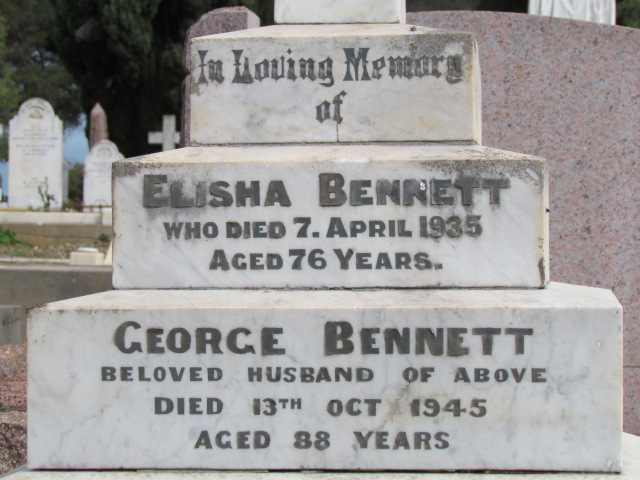
Elisha and George Bennett

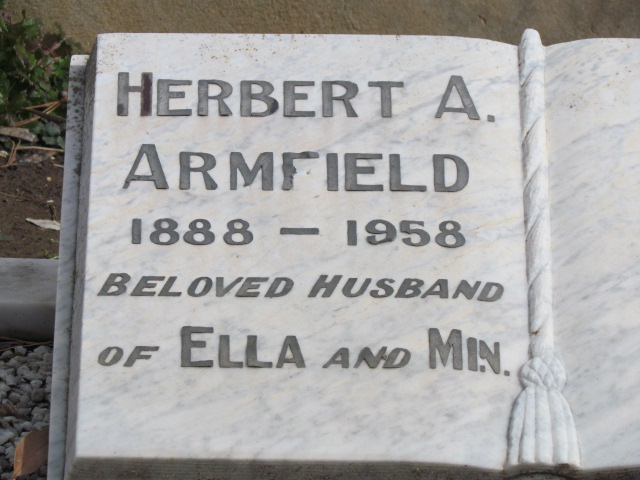
Herbert Armfield

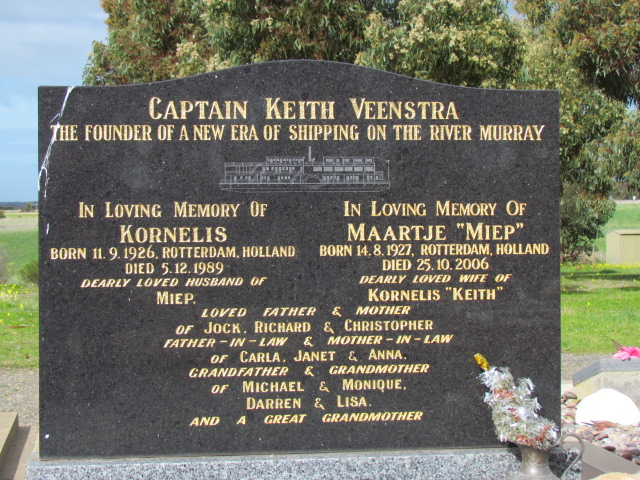
Keith Veenstra

See also Murray–Darling steamboat people
