= Charles Henry Goode =

Australian politician

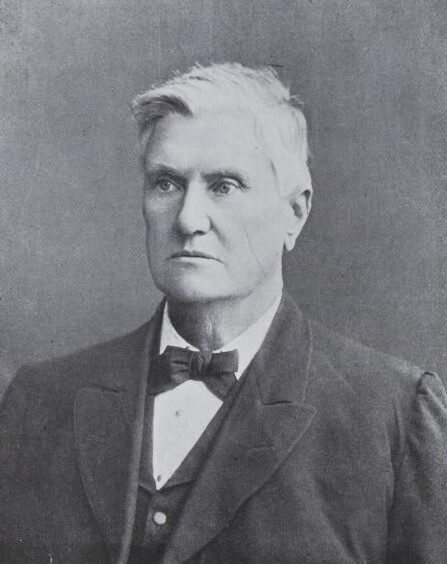

Sir Charles Henry Goode (/ɡuːd/, 26 May 1827 – 5 February 1922) was a British Australian merchant, businessman, politician and philanthropist in the early days South Australia. He founded Goode, Durrant and Company in 1882.

== History ==
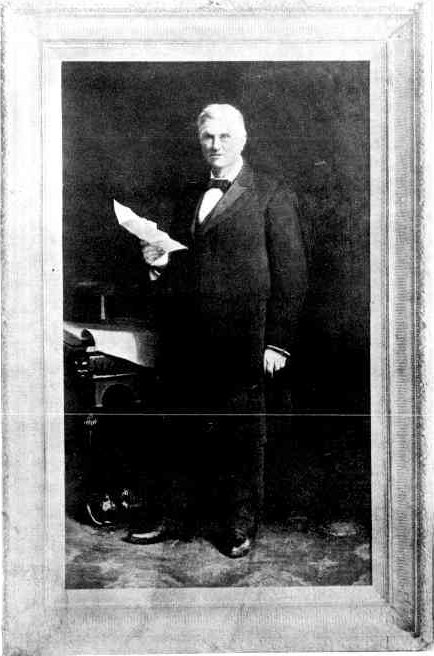
Portrait of Goode by George A. J. Webb

He was born at Hinton, near Peterchurch, Herefordshire on 26 May 1827, and was apprenticed at the age of 12 years to a drapery establishment in Hereford, and in 1845 he proceeded to London, where he worked for Goode, Gainsborough and Co. and was, with later fellow-Adelaidean R. A. Tarlton, one of the first members of YMCA and closely identified with its founder Sir George Williams.

In 1848 he left England for South Australia aboard John Mitchell with Thomas Good (c. 1822 – 21 January 1889) of Birmingham (each later married a sister of the other), arriving in Adelaide in April 1849. Together they travelled the State by horse and cart hawking softgoods, and were successful enough to start a small softgoods business in Kermode Street, North Adelaide. (Thomas Good later founded the softgoods firm Good, Toms & Co. His son Charles T. Good, was to be a partner in the architectural firm of Williams and Good who, amongst other work, designed the Grenfell Street premises of Goode, Durrant and Co.)

In September 1850 his parents and brothers Samuel and Matthew arrived in Adelaide on the Princess Helena, and helped carry on the business for 30 years as Goode Brothers. Warehouses were established in Rundle Street, Stephens Place and Grenfell Street, and carried out business throughout South Australia, Western Australia, and Broken Hill, New South Wales. A London establishment was opened in 1859, and Charles Goode returned to England for four years.

=== Politics ===
Charles was back in Adelaide from 1863 to 1867. In March 1865 he was elected, with Neville Blyth, a brother of Sir Arthur Blyth, as a member of the House of Assembly for East Torrens, the same election at which Adam Lindsay Gordon entered Parliament. He was a leading member of a committee appointed to secure religious equality in celebration of marriages as embodied in the Marriage Bill. He was at that time described by the Rev. James Maughan (October 1826 – 8 March 1871) as "a gentleman well known not only as an earnest advocate, but also as a firm supporter of the great cause of civil and religious equality". In 1866 Goode resigned his seat in the Assembly due to demands of his business. The conclusion of the American Civil War had sparked a worldwide recession and Charles was doing everything he could to keep the firm solvent.

=== Return to London ===
The following year Goode again returned to England, and remained for 12 months, managing the London branch of the company. While there, he was active in religious and philanthropic work, helping with the Field Lane Ragged Schools (with which Charles Dickens was associated), assisted with Regent's Park College and Rev. Dr. William Landells' Baptist church at Regent's Park, where he led the young men's Bible class. Among his pupils was Jacob Gould Schurman, who became President of Cornell University.

=== Goode, Durrant, Tite and Co. ===
In 1882 the partnership Goode Brothers was dissolved by mutual consent, and a new partnership with William Howard Durrant (c. 1819 – 15 September 1910) (previously a partner in Snook, Durrant and Co. of Nottingham) was formed, with temporary premises in Leigh Street, Durrant taking over the London branch. William Henry Tite (1832–1903), who had been associated with Goode Brothers for 20 years, joined the partnership later that year and remained with them until he retired in 1894. the company again becoming Goode, Durrant and Co. Durrant died in 1910 without ever visiting Australia. His association with Goode and George Wills (1823–1906), another prominent Adelaide draper, dates back to their days as employees of Goode, Gainsborough and Co. in London. The firm took much of the newly built Y.M.C.A. building, and in 1905 their own building in Grenfell Street. On Tite's retirement the firm became Goode, Durrant & Co., Limited.

=== Goode, Durrant and Murray ===
In the early 1930s both Goode, Durrant and their competitor D. & W. Murray Limited were operating at a loss, and combined their financial resources, and amalgamated their Adelaide businesses, returning to profitability. D & W. Murray's building on Gawler Place was left vacant, later tenanted without charge or at peppercorn rental by the Red Cross Society.

== Other business interests ==
Charles Henry Goode was, with J. H. Barrow, previously editor of the Register, a founder of the Adelaide Advertiser in 1858. The company was re-formed in 1864, with additional shareholders Philip Henry Burden (died 5 March 1864), John Baker, Captain Scott, James Counsell, Thomas Graves and some others. His brother Matthew sold his share in 1871 on his behalf (Charles was in London) when the partnership was dissolved. By this time the shareholders were John Henry Barrow, Charles Henry Goode, Robert Stuckey, Thomas Graves, William Parkin, Thomas King, James Counsell, and George Williams Chinner. He was chairman of the Adelaide Hat Factory, Ltd. a director of the AMP Society, and of the London and Lancashire Insurance Company. For a time he and his partners dabbled in sheep farming, but lost on the venture.

== Philanthropic and religious activities ==
Goode was a great supporter of the Industrial School for the Blind, Adelaide YMCA, the James Brown Memorial Trust (managing Kalyra Home for Consumptives and Estcourt House), and the Children's Hospital. An extension of "Kalyra" was named the "Goode Wing" in his honour. Goode served under Samuel Way on the 1883–1885 Parliamentary Commission established to investigate the operation of the Destitute Persons Act, which established the State Children's Council, of which he was a founding member. He was a committeeman with the District Trained Nursing Society, the Convalescent Home, the Benevolent and Strangers' Friend Society, president of the Home for Weak Minded Children, chairman of the Adult Deaf and Dumb Mission, president of the Royal Institution for the Blind. For many years he ran the Flinders Street Baptist Young Men's Bible Class.

== Recognition ==
- His portrait was presented by the people of Adelaide to the Art Gallery of South Australia
- He was knighted in 1912.

== Family ==
Sir Charles had three brothers in South Australia: Thomas Goode (1816–1882) of Goolwa, Matthew Goode (c. 1820–1901) of Matthew Goode and Co. and Samuel Goode jun. He had two sisters in South Australia – Ann and Elizabeth. Their father, Samuel Goode snr., had leasehold properties at Walkerville and Islington.

Thomas Goode (c. 1834 – 22 July 1926) of Canowie Station and Matthew Goode of Goolwa were cousins.

Sir Charles Goode married twice; first on 6 August 1856 to Mary Harriet Good (c. 1830 – 18 August 1889), sister of his first business partner, and who was an invalid for much of her adult life, and on 16 December 1890 to Mrs. Helen Augusta Lloyd (née Smith), (12 March 1852 – 16 August 1936), who grew up in Beaumont and was educated by Elizabeth Whitby. She was the widow of Rev. Morgan Lloyd (1850–1888) and sister of Quinton Stow Smith (1864–1963), the first lay president of the Baptist Union. Sir Charles Goode had no children. Children of Lady Goode were:

- Ethel Innes Lloyd (1881–1951),
- Constance Gwen Lloyd (c. 1884–1913) married Harold Charles Drew on 2 March 1904
- Helen Lloyd (c. 1885–1906).
