= School Boards of Advice =

The School Board of Advice was a term used in the colonies of Victoria and South Australia for an elected body within a local government area whose remit was to handle the business aspects of a State school or schools in the area. Similar schemes were initiated by Acts of Parliament in Victoria in 1873 and South Australia in 1875, and abolished in both States with the passage of new Education Acts around 1915, to be replaced by school committees or councils. The latter bodies were attached to individual schools and elected by parents, whereas the original were attached to the local council, so responsible for several schools, and elected by ratepayers.

== Victoria ==
The Education Act 1872, which came into operation on 1 January 1873, in clause 15 provided for establishment of boards of advice, summarised here:

For the purpose of Education, the colony of Victoria was divided into school districts, congruent with local government areas, and one School Board of Advice established for each district, so in some districts the board was responsible for two or three schools. Every three years a new board, of five to seven members, was elected by ratepayers from a panel of nominees of whom no qualification, residential or otherwise, was demanded. Duties of the board were to include:

1. Determination of what use should be made of buildings outside of school hours
2. Suspension of a teacher for misconduct and notification of such decisions to the Minister
3. Report on condition of school buildings and request furniture and other necessities
4. Visit the school from time to time, and report on attendance and give an opinion on management and general condition of the school
5. Encourage regular attendance of children and report on recalcitrant families
6. To recommend school fees and nominate outstanding students for scholarship purposes

The Sandhurst board, for which there was no shortage of nominees, was chosen as the model for proving the principle.

The Advocate noted with approval that Catholics in one district decided to neither nominate, nor vote for, any candidate.

By November 1873, 297 Boards of Advice had been established, of which only a handful had been subjects of criticisms.

School Boards of Advice were abolished with the (Victorian) Education Act of 1916, to be replaced by school councils.

== South Australia ==
The education reforms in the neighbouring colony of Victoria were commented on approvingly by editors of the major South Australian newspapers, though conceding that Victoria, with its deep religious rivalries, had more need of reform. A great number of State schools had been created "from scratch" or by reforming private schools, leaving a small number of independent church-based colleges. Rather than the feared class distinctions arising between students in the two systems, a substantial drift from private schools to "free" (State) schools occurred.

Great quantities of educational books were imported from England for use in State schools, optionally for purchase by students, in which case they could be taken home, otherwise remained school property, for general use.

In August 1873 Attorney-General Stevenson submitted to Parliament, belatedly said one editor, a Bill based on the Victorian Act, supplanting the Education Act, No. 20 of 1851. "Boards of Advice" were variously criticised for being pointless and with having too much power, but it was clear that something of the sort was necessary to counteract the swarms of "little urchins without shoes and stockings . . . wandering the streets", who needed to be "brought under the influence of education".

The (Catholic) Southern Cross argued (with support from Anglican Messenger) that the Victorian Act was not only unjust and a failure, but ruinously expensive — "about one-sixth . . . of the whole revenue of the colony".

When it passed into law, Section 17 of the Education Act of 1875 provided for the establishment of Boards of Advice, whose duties and responsibilities were defined in the Regulations issued by the Council of Education, the contents of which, according to one newspaper, left the Boards "with no legislative and very little executive power" and by giving them no responsibility risked making them "lifeless and ineffective","Boards of Advice". South Australian Register. Vol. XLI, no. 9102. South Australia. 17 January 1876. p. 4 – via National Library of Australia. leaving to the school principal decisions which should properly be delegated.

School Boards of Advice ended in South Australia with the Education Act, 1915, and State schools were encouraged to established their own committees.
