= Matthew Goode and Co =

Australian wholesale company

Matthew Goode and Co. was a softgoods wholesaler (soft goods being cloth and articles made from it) of Adelaide, South Australia with branches in Perth, Western Australia and Broken Hill, New South Wales in Australia.

== History ==
=== Matthew Goode ===
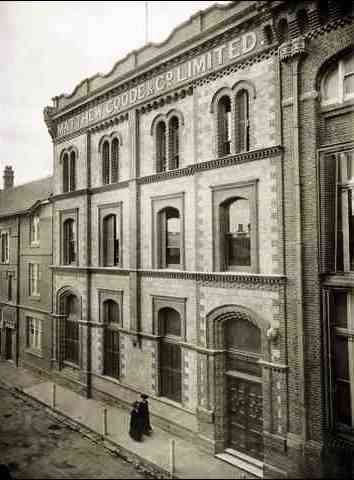
Warehouse of Matthew Goode and Co. Stephen's Place, Adelaide

Matthew Goode (c. 1820 – 26 August 1901) was born at either Hampton Charles, Worcester, or Leominster, Herefordshire England. He was apprenticed to a draper in Hereford, where he worked for some time, then he and his brother, Charles Henry Goode, moved to London. Charles decided to try his luck in South Australia and journeyed to Adelaide, where he opened a successful drapery business in Kermode street, North Adelaide, and four or five years later Matthew Goode, who had been working with Goode Gainford and Co., of The Borough, London and J and C Boyd and Co. of Friday Street, London, together with brother Samuel and their parents, arrived in Adelaide on the Princess Helena in September 1850 . Shortly afterwards they removed to Rundle Street, in a building which was later occupied by Charles Birks & Co.

For a time, Charles Moore was an employee, and went on to found the celebrated department store in Grote Street and Victoria Square.
Robert John Lavis (c. 1860 – 27 May 1941) had a career with Goode Brothers and Matthew Goode and Co., then in 1907 purchased the moribund Hooper's Furnishers of Hindley Street, which he turned into a highly regarded and profitable institution.

Charles and Matthew then opened a wholesale warehouse in Stephens Place, under the name of Goode Bros. The retail business was later sold to L. Roach. Subsequently, Goode Brothers removed to Grenfell Street, and in 1870 after the brothers had been together in business for over 30 years they dissolved their partnership. Matthew Goode and his sons continued in possession of the warehouse in Grenfell Street, while C. H. Goode became a proprietor of the wholesalers Goode, Durrant, & Co., also in Grenfell Street.

Matthew Goode was for a few years a member of Adelaide City Council. He then strongly advocated the construction of the deep drainage system, which, was adopted, despite many members who wanted the refuse drained to the sea. He was one of the founders of the Stow Memorial Church, and for several years he was the treasurer of the church. He was on the committee of the local chapter of the London Missionary Society, and was connected with the Adelaide City Mission from the time of its inception, and with the Lay Preachers' Association. He worked with Sir George Williams in connection with the London YMCA, and with Dean Russell in the Funeral Reform Association.

=== The next generation ===
In 1902 the Grenfell Street premises were disposed of, and the business relocated to the old Goode Brothers site on Stephens Place, and the company was floated as a limited liability company with Edward Francis Goode, (Matthew) Albert Goode and R. J. Leavis as directors. Five years later Samuel Henry Goode replaced Leavis. In 1923 the directors were Edward Francis, Matthew Albert, and Arthur Hedley Goode, and the London office was managed by H. P. Goode. The company had 16 commercial travellers covering the whole State, with interstate branches in Argent Street, Broken Hill and Hay Street, Perth. Paul Goode was a director in 1928.

=== Family ===
Matthew Goode was a brother of Sir Charles Henry Goode MP., founder of Goode, Durrant and Co., Samuel Goode jun, and Elizabeth Ann Goode who also emigrated to South Australia; she married John Ham Marshall in 1853. Their parents Samuel (died 1856) and Ann (c. 1786 – 15 July 1874) had leasehold properties at Walkerville and Islington. Ann was a sister of Sarah Tolley (c. 1793–1872), mother of George Tolley of Rundle Street.

Thomas Goode (1816–1882) of Goolwa was a cousin, whose family included Matthew Goode (1847–1931) who ran a business in Willunga.

In 1850, before leaving England, Matthew Goode was married in Hereford to Anne Jones (1826 - 19 June 1852) of Fencott in Worcestershire. Anne died aged 26 in Adelaide; the following year Matthew Goode married her sister Elisabeth Jones (1838 – 19 May 1902).

They were daughters of Elizabeth Britten (1804-1882) and Edward Jones (1792 – 29 January 1880) of Welland in Worcestershire who also migrated to South Australia, and farmed at Finniss Point before retiring to Hutt Street, Adelaide. Their daughters were:
- Anne Jones (1826 - 19 June 1852) married Matthew Goode in 1850
- Elisabeth Jones (1838 – 19 May 1902) married Matthew Goode in 1853
- Frances Jones (c. 1844 – 1 February 1930) married Matthew's cousin Benjamin Powell Goode on 19 June 1867;
- Emily G. Jones (October 1845 – 17 October 1932), married Benjamin's brother Henry Abel Goode on 19 August 1868
- Marion Jones (c. 1853–1929), married a third brother William Goode. These last three were partners in the Port Pirie firm of H. A. and W. Goode.

The children of Anne Jones & Matthew Goode included:

- Edward Samuel Jones Goode (1852–1852)

The children of Elizabeth Jones & Matthew Goode included:

- Samuel Henry "Harry" Goode (1855 – 19 January 1933) married Alice Mary Smith on 28 November 1878. A director of Matthew Goode and Co.

- Henry Percival Goode (14 September 1879 – 1973) married Gladys Wearing MacLachlan on 29 July 1911. Gladys was a daughter of Dr. MacLachlan and grand-daughter of Justice Wearing. He was in London office at the outbreak of World War I and enlisted with the British Army. He was active with St. John Ambulance, Home Guard, Liberal and Country League. Samuel was a pioneer of lacrosse in South Australia.
- (Arthur) Hedley Goode (8 October 1881 – later than 1950) married Marianne Hill on 7 October 1909, was wounded in action, World War I. A director of Matthew Goode and Co.

- Jones Goode (1857– )
- Annie J. Goode ( – 3 January 1911) married Canadian Joseph V. Bedford at Burnside, Manitoba on 7 July 1906
- Clara Elizabeth Goode (1859 – 26 August 1949) married Irish scholar Samuel Marcus Russell (10 February 1865 – 5 December 1917) on 28 January 1899. Clara travelled as a missionary to Peking, China. There she resigned to marry Professor Russell of Imperial College, a mathematics, astronomy and Chinese scholar remembered for his adaptation of W. H. Murray's system of teaching Mandarin Chinese to the blind, and a study of a lunar eclipse of the Zhou dynasty. Both were (erroneously) reported killed in the Boxer Rebellion, Beijing in July 1900. He wrote The Story of the Siege in Peking (1901) They later lived at Portage la Prairie, Manitoba, Canada,
- Edith Marion Goode (1862 – sometime after 1953) married Rev. John Maconnach Allardyce on 10 November 1892. They were both missionaries to China and were married in Peking. He was likewise feared killed in the Boxer Rebellion, in July 1900 and retired to Winnipeg, Manitoba, Canada and were buried at Portage la Prairie, Manitoba. Their son, Matthew Lancelot Allardyce (23 May 1904 – 10 Oct 1940), served with the Calgary Highlanders, RCIC, in World War II and was killed in action.
- Edward Francis "Frank" Goode (5 December 1863 – 23 November 1937) married Emily Annie Burden on 6 June 1888, died in Perth
- Florence Grace (1865-1962) married Samuel Alfred Davenport ( – 5 December 1919) on 25 June 1891. Davenport, son of a Macclesfield sheepfarmer, was a businessman with interests in the Bridgewater flour mill, then stockbroker with Stow Smith in the firm of Davenport, Smith and Roberts. Florence was, with Madame Krakowsky, active in Travellers' Aid Society.
- Lily Hope Goode (1867–1949)
- Mabel Faith Goode (1869 – 2 July 1923) married Canadian Gilbert Bedford. She died at Portage la Prairie
- youngest son (Matthew) Albert Goode (1872 – 14 June 1939) married second cousin (Frances) Ethel Goode ( – 18 May 1954) on 25 October 1894. Ethel was a daughter of Henry Abel Goode, cofounder of H. A. and W. Goode. Albert was a director of Matthew Goode and Co., later with competitors G & R Wills.
- Christina Love Goode MB. BS. DPH. (1874 – 25 August 1951) married Alexander Krakowsky M.D. ( – 18 June 1930) on 19 October 1914. She was a student at Miss Aldersey's School, studied medicine at Adelaide University for four years and completed her degree, with honors, at Melbourne in 1898. In 1906 she was appointed senior medical officer at the West Ham Infirmary, where she had been working for four years. This was the first occasion on which a woman has been made a senior officer at any infirmary in England. They returned to Adelaide in 1916 and took up positions at the Renmark hospital. She was prominent in the Girl Guide movement and a founding member of the Adelaide Lyceum Club.
- Kathleen Mercy Goode (1876 – ) married Norman Shaw in Japan, on 16 November 1907. Norman was a son of Rev Alexander Croft Shaw (5 February 1840 – 13 March 1902), Archdeacon of Tokyo, and had been working at Antung, China. Shaw wrote articles for Imperial Maritime Customs on "The Soya Bean of Manchuria" (1911), "Silk" (1917) and "Chinese Forest Trees and Timber Supply".

He had a residence in Wakefield Street.
