= Matthew Goode (merchant) =

Australian merchant (1847 - 1931)

- Born: 1847; Kyre Magna, Worcester, England
- Died: 1 March 1931 (aged 83–84)

Matthew Goode (1847 – 1 March 1931) was a softgoods retailer in the early days of South Australia, an important figure in the town of Willunga.

== History ==
Matthew Goode was born at Kyre Magna, Worcester, England, the seventh son of William Goode, who was the seventh son of Thomas Goode, of Horton, Hereford. He was educated under the Rev. H. E. Kemp, at Cleobury Mortimer. His brothers Thomas, Henry Abel, William and Benjamin Powell Goode emigrated to South Australia on the Hope in 1858. William, Benjamin and Henry had opened a shop in Yankalilla Charles Rufus Goode came out in 1860, His sister Ann emigrated to Adelaide on the Candahar in 1851. A brother, Samuel and sister, Elizabeth (1837–1925) are recorded as travelling on the same ship, but later settled in Newcastle upon Tyne. Elizabeth married a tailor, Alfred John Prince Porter, and had ten children. Her brother Samuel was also a tailor.

After his parents' deaths he decided to follow his five brothers to South Australia. He left England in 1868, sailing in the South Australian on her maiden voyage, taking three months. After working for a time on Canowie Station for his brother Thomas, he went south. His brothers H. A. & W. Goode put him in charge of the Willunga branch of their expanding business. After 26 years' service he took over the branch, which his brothers had decided to relinquish. He was an energetic and conscientious worker for the town of Willunga – for 25 years he was a member of the district council, and many times occupied the chair. He was the senior Justice of the Peace in the Willunga District, having received his commission on 8 January 1890. He was widely read and an accomplished organist.

== Family ==
William Goode and Catherine Goode lived at Kyre Magna, near Tenbury, Worcester. Their family included:

- Ann Goode ( – ) emigrated on the Candahar, arrived in South Australia December 1851, with her sister Elizabeth and brother Samuel, who later returned to England, settling in Newcastle upon Tyne.
- Samuel Goode on the Candahar in 1851, but returned to England
- Thomas (1835–1926) emigrated on the Hope, arriving February 1858.
- Elizabeth Goode (c. 1837 – 28 May 1925) on the Candahar in 1851, but returned to England
- Henry Abel Goode (1838–1921) also on the Hope
- William Goode (c. 1840– ) also on the Hope
- Benjamin Powell Goode (c. 1841– ) also on the Hope
- Charles Rufus Goode (1844–1913) emigrated in 1860
- Matthew Goode (1847–1931) arrived on the South Australian in 1868. He married Selina "Lena" Haynes ( – 17 October 1946) on 1 September 1885

- Stella Goode (1886–1961)
- Eurydice "Eury" Goode (1889–1970) married Frank Evan Webb ( –1962) in 1924
- Lincoln Goode (1894–1964) married Reta Marjorie Haynes (1900–1982) on 28 June 1924.

Their home was "Wingarth", Willunga
