= Goode (name) =

Goode (/ɡuːd/ GOOD or /ɡʊd/ GUUD, depending on family) is a middle name and surname of English origins. People with this name may include:

== People with the middle name Goode ==
- Lucy Goode Brooks (1818–1900), American slave who was instrumental in the founding of the Friends' Asylum for Colored Orphans
- Eslanda Goode Robeson (c. 1895 – 1965), American anthropologist, author, actor and civil rights activist
- Henry Goode Blasdel (1825–1900), American politician

== People with the surname Goode ==
=== A ===
- Adam Goode (born 1983), American politician
- Agnes Goode (1872–1947), Australian social and political activist
- Alex Goode (Born 1988), British rugby union player
- Alexander D. Goode (1911–1943), US Army chaplain
- Andy Goode (born 1980), British rugby union player
- Andy Goode (badminton) (born 1960), English badminton player
- Arthur Frederick Goode III (1954–1984), American murderer

=== B ===
- Barry Goode (born 1948), American judge in Contra Costa County, California
- Benjamin Goode (1924–2014), Australian cricketer
- Bertram Goode (1886–1955), English footballer
- Brad Goode (born 1963), American jazz trumpeter, bassist, drummer, composer and music educator
- Brett Goode (born 1984), American football player

=== C ===
- Cameron Goode (born 1998), American football player
- Caroline Goode, British retired police detective
- Charles Henry Goode (1827–1922) Australian merchant, founder of Goode, Durrant and Co.
- Charles Joachim Goode, railways chief in New South Wales
- Charles Rufus Goode (1844–1913), pastoralist and politician in South Australia
- Charlie Goode (born 1995), English association football player
- Chris Goode (disambiguation)
  - Chris Goode (American football) (born 1963), NFL Player 1987-1993 Indianapolis Colts
- Clarence Goode (1875–1969) South Australian farmer and politician
- Coleridge Goode (1914–2015), Jamaican British jazz musician
- Conrad Goode (born 1962), American football player

=== D ===
- Daniel Goode (born 1936), American composer and clarinetist
- David Goode (disambiguation)
  - David Goode (organist) (born 1971), British organist
  - David Goode (sculptor) (born 1966), British sculptor
- David R. Goode, retired CEO of Norfolk Southern Corporation
- Dewey Goode (1898–1972), American politician
- Dunny Goode (1929–2004), American football coach

=== E ===
- Elena Goode, American actress who stars on the daytime soap As The World Turns
- Eric Goode (born 1957), American businessman and film director
- Erich Goode, American sociologist

=== F ===
- Frank Goode (born 1939), Australian rules footballer

=== G ===
- George Brown Goode (1851–1896), American ichthyologist
- Gigi Goode (born 1997), American drag queen
- Graham Goode, British racing driver

=== H ===
- Harry Goode (disambiguation)
  - Harry Goode (politician) (1938–2013), American politician
  - Harry H. Goode (1909–1960), American engineer
  - Harry King Goode (1892–1942), British World War I flying ace

=== J ===
- James Goode (rugby union) (born 1982), Welsh rugby player
- James Moore Goode (1939–2019), American architectural historian
- Jamie Goode, British wine writer
- Jason Goode (born 1986), American football player
- Jeff Goode, American television show creator
- Jeremy Goode (born 1972), English cricketer
- Jim Goode (1944–2016), American businessperson
- Joanne Goode (born 1972), former British badminton player
- Joe Goode (born 1937), American artist and painter
- John Goode (disambiguation)
  - John Goode (Virginia politician) (1829–1909), American politician
  - John Paul Goode (1862–1932), American geographer
  - John W. Goode (1923–1994), American lawyer and Republican politician

=== K ===
- Katherine Hancock Goode (1872–1928), American teacher, teacher educator, administrator, and state legislator
- Kerry Goode (born 1965), American football player

=== L ===
- Lynda Tolbert-Goode (born 1967), American hurdler

=== M ===
- Malvin Russell Goode (1908–1995), African-American television journalist
- Mary Goode (born 1979), Irish field hockey goalkeeper
- Matthew Goode (born 1978), British actor
- Matthew Goode (1820–1901), founder of Matthew Goode and Co., an Australian softgoods wholesaler
- Michael Goode (born 1952), British cross-country skier
- Milton Goode (born 1960), American high jumper
- Morton G. Goode (1886–1959), American politician

=== N ===
- Najee Goode (born 1989), American football player

=== P ===
- Patrick Gaines Goode (1798–1862), American lawyer, and legislator
- P. Wayne Goode (1937–2020), American politician

=== R ===
- Richard Goode (born 1943), American classical pianist
- Richard Urquhart Goode (1858–1903), American geographer
- Royal Goode (1913–1978), Swedish chess player
- Roy Goode (born 1933), British lawyer

=== S ===
- Samuel Goode (disambiguation)
- Sarah E. Goode (1855–1905), first African American woman to get a US patent
- Sarah Ford Judd Goode (1854–1921), American clubwoman
- Sebastian Goode (born c. 1599), English politician who sat in the House of Commons
- Steven Goode (disambiguation)

=== T ===
- Terry Goode (born 1961), English former professional footballer
- Thomas Goode (disambiguation)
  - Thomas Goode (merchant) (1816–1882), Australian merchant
- Tom Goode (disambiguation)
  - Tom Goode (footballer) (1938–2015), American football player, coach, and administrator
  - Tom Goode (politician) (1900–1983), Canadian politician

=== V ===
- Virgil Goode (born 1946), American politician

=== W ===
- W. Wilson Goode Jr. (born 1965), Philadelphia City Councilman
- Washington Goode (1820–1849), American murderer
- William Goode (disambiguation)
  - William Goode, the elder (1762–1816), English Evangelical Anglican clergyman
  - William Allmond Codrington Goode, British colonial administrator
- Wilson Goode (born 1938), former mayor of Philadelphia
- Woodrow Wilson Goode (disambiguation)

== See also ==
- Goode (disambiguation)
- Good (surname)
