= Good (disambiguation) =

Good is that which is to be preferred and prescribed; not evil.

Good or Goods may also refer to:

- Goods, materials that satisfy human wants and provide utility
  - Capital good, a durable good that is used in the production of goods or services
  - Final good or consumer good, a commodity that is used by the consumer to satisfy wants or needs

== Philosophy ==
- Form of the Good, Plato's macrocosmic view of goodness in living
- Good and evil, the distinction between positive and negative entities
- Summum bonum, the "highest good"

== Places ==
- Good, West Virginia, United States, an unincorporated community

== People ==
- Good (surname)
- List of people known as the Good

== Science ==
- Great Observatories Origins Deep Survey (GOODS), an astronomical survey

== Media, arts and entertainment ==
=== Film and television ===
- Good (film), a 2008 adaptation of Taylor's play
- The Goods: Live Hard, Sell Hard, a 2009 American comedy directed by Neal Brennan
- The Goods (TV series), a Canadian talk show and lifestyle program
- "The Good" (Law & Order: Criminal Intent), a 2006 TV episode

=== Literature ===
- Good!, a 1927 poem by Vladimir Mayakovsky
- Good (play), 1981, by Cecil Philip Taylor

=== Music ===
- The Goods (band), a 1989–1999 American rock band

==== Albums ====
- Good (Morphine album) or the title song, 1992
- Good, by Goodshirt, 2001

==== Songs ====
- "Good" (Better Than Ezra song), 1995
- "Good" (Twin XL song), 2018
- "Good (Can't Be Anything Else)", by Cody Carnes, 2022
- "Good (Don't Die)", a song by ¥$, 2024
- "Good", by Allie X from CollXtion I, 2015
- "Good", by Dizzee Rascal from The Fifth, 2013
- "Good", by EXID from Street, 2016
- "Good", by Lindsay Ell from The Project, 2017

=== Other uses in arts and entertainment ===
- Good (Alderac Entertainment Group), a 2002 role-playing game supplement

== Organizations ==
=== Brands and enterprises ===
- GOOD Music, an American record label
- Good Technology, a mobile security provider
- Good Worldwide, a media and events company

=== Political parties ===
- Good (political party), a South African political party, styled as GOOD
- Good Party (İYİ Party), a Turkish political party

== See also ==
- God (disambiguation)
- Goode, surname
- Goodes (disambiguation)
- Goodness (disambiguation)
- Good Good (disambiguation)
