= Goodness =

Goodness may refer to:

- Good
- Goodness!, a 1969 album by jazz saxophonist Houston Person
- Goodness and value theory
- Goodness (band)
- Goodness (Goodness album)
- Goodness (The Hotelier album)
- Goodness, Greek concept arete
- Goodness, lunar feature a.k.a. Lacus Bonitatis
- Summum bonum, the "highest good"
- Eric Laithwaite's Goodness factor, a measure of the effectiveness of an electromagnetic machine

== See also ==
- Form of the Good, Plato's macrocosmic view of goodness in living
- Good (disambiguation)
- Good and evil
- Goodes (disambiguation)
- Goode, surname
- Goods (disambiguation)
- Good (surname)
- List of people known as the Good
