= Goodes =

Goodes is a surname. Notable people with the surname include:

- Adam Goodes (born 1980), Australian football player
- Brett Goodes (born 1984), Australian football player
- Guy Goodes (born 1971), British-Israeli basketball player and coach
- Herbert Goodes (died 1986), Australian public servant
- Melvin Goodes, Canadian businessman
- Mike Goodes (born 1956), American golfer
- Reg Goodes (1928-1996), Australian football player
- Reggie Goodes (born 1991), New Zealand rugby player

== See also ==
- Form of the Good, Plato's macrocosmic view of goodness in living
- Good (disambiguation)
- Goode, surname
- Goodness (disambiguation)
- Goods (disambiguation)
- Good (surname)
- List of people known as the Good
