= William Goode =

William Goode may refer to:

- William Goode (politician) (1798–1859), American politician and lawyer from Virginia
- William Goode, the elder (1762–1816), English clergyman
- William Goode (priest) (1801–1868), English churchman, Dean of Ripon 1860–1868, son of William Goode the elder
- William Goode (cricketer) (1881–1959), New Zealand cricketer
- William Allmond Codrington Goode (1907–1986), British colonial governor of Singapore and North Borneo
- William Thomas Goode (1859–1932), British academic, linguist and journalist
- Dunny Goode (1929–2004), football coach for Eastern New Mexico University

== See also ==
- William Good (disambiguation)
