= Ralph Earhart =

American football player (1923–1997)

No. 41
- Position: Halfback

Personal information
- Born: March 29, 1923; Milburn, Oklahoma, U.S.
- Died: May 1, 1997 (aged 74); Dallas County, Texas, U.S.
- Listed height: 5 ft 10 in (1.78 m)
- Listed weight: 165 lb (75 kg)

Career information
- High school: Lefors (Lefors, Texas)
- College: Pittsburg State; Texas Tech
- NFL draft: 1948: 32nd round, 296th overall pick

Career history
- Green Bay Packers (1948–1949)

Career NFL statistics
- Rushing yards: 194
- Rushing average: 3.9
- Receptions: 22
- Receiving yards: 303
- Total touchdowns: 4
- Stats at Pro Football Reference

Ralph Earhart (March 29, 1923 – May 1, 1997) was a halfback in the National Football League (NFL). Earhart was born on March 29, 1923, in Milburn, Oklahoma. He attended Lefors High School where he played football, basketball and track-and-field. Earhart's football team's were successful, reaching various local title games and winning the district title during his senior year. However, it was revealed that Earhart had played high school basketball prior to attending Lefors, meaning he was ineligible for sports his senior year. The football team forfeited their games and district title that season.

Earhart graduated from high school and began attending Texas Tech where he played college football. However, with the advent of World War II, Earhart joined the United States Navy. During his time in the Navy, he played for a naval football team. He attained the rank of Second Class Petty officer before leaving the Navy and rejoining Texas Tech. During his time on the Texas Tech football team, he played in the 1948 Sun Bowl. During his senior year, he led he team in pass receiving and scoring. He also participated in the college's track-and-field team, recording a 9.7 second finish in the 100-yard dash. He graduated from Texas Tech with a bachelor's degree in physical education and was married with one child at the time.

Earhart was drafted by the Green Bay Packers in the thirty-second round of the 1948 NFL draft. Head coach Curly Lambeau drafted Earhart with a focus on his speed and expected him to compete for a starting halfback position. In his first game with the Packers, Earhart scored a 63-yard rushing touchdown as the Packers beat the Boston Yanks 31–0. Earhart played for the Packers for two seasons, recording 194 rushing yards, 303 receiving yards and 3 total touchdowns.
