= Gooder =

Gooder is a surname. Notable people with the surname include:

- Frederick John Gooder (1862–1948), New Zealand cricketer
- Grace Gooder (1924–1983), New Zealand cricketer
- Paula Gooder (born 1969), English Theologian

== See also ==
- John Gooders (1937–2010), British ornithological writer
- Gooden
- Goodey
- Better (disambiguation)
