= Lefors =

- Lefors, Texas, a town in Gray County, Texas, United States
- Stefan LeFors, a former quarterback in American and Canadian football
