= Tom Goode =

Tom Goode may refer to:

- Tom Goode (American football) (1938–2015) American football player, coach, and administrator
- Tom Goode (politician) (1900–1983), Canadian politician

== See also ==
- Thomas Goode (disambiguation)
- Goode (name)
