= David Goode =

David Goode or Good may refer to:

- David Goode (organist) (born 1971), British organist and head of keyboard at Eton College
- David Goode (sculptor) (born 1966), British sculptor
- David R. Goode (born 1941), retired chairman, president, and CEO of Norfolk Southern Corporation
- David Good (driver) (1933 – 2017), British hillclimb driver
- David Good (golfer) (born 1947), Australian golfer
- David Good (author) (born 1942), son of Kenneth Good, anthropologist

== See also ==
- Goode (surname)
