= Bad =

Bad or BAD may refer to:

== Common meanings ==
- Evil, the opposite of moral good
- Erroneous, inaccurate or incorrect
- Unhealthy, or counter to well-being
- Antagonist, the threat or obstacle of moral good

== Acronyms ==
- BAD-2, a Soviet armored trolley car
- Bank account debits tax, an Australian tax
- Bcl-2-associated death promoter, a pro-apoptotic protein
- Team B.A.D., a professional wrestling tag team

== Films ==
- Andy Warhol's Bad, a 1977 film
- Bad, an unfinished film by Theo van Gogh
- Bad (2025 film), an Indian Kannada-language action thriller film

== Music ==
=== Performers ===
- B. A. D., the Taiwanese boy band, who formed in 1998
- Big Audio Dynamite, Mick Jones' post-Clash band, from London
- Royce da 5'9", the American rapper known as Bad, in the group Bad Meets Evil

=== Albums ===
- Bad (album), a 1987 album by Michael Jackson
- BAD, or Bigger and Deffer, the second album by LL Cool J, 1987

=== Songs ===
- "Bad" (U2 song), 1984
- "BAD", from the 1985 album This Is Big Audio Dynamite by Big Audio Dynamite
- "Bad" (Michael Jackson song), 1987
- "Bad", from the 2011 album Symphony Soldier by The Cab
- "Bad" (Wale song), 2013
- "Bad" (David Guetta and Showtek song), 2014
- "Bad!" (XXXTentacion song), 2018
- "Bad" (James Bay song), 2019
- "Bad", by Don Diablo, featuring Zak Abel, 2020
- "Bad", from the 2024 album P1X3L by Phoebus Ng
- "Bad", from the 2026 album Golden Hour: Part.5 by Ateez

=== Other music ===
- Bad (tour), a Michael Jackson world tour

== Places ==
- "Bad" is the German word for "bath/spa" and so is found in many placenames in German-speaking Europe, e.g. Bad Kissingen
- Bad, Azerbaijan, a village in the Quba District
- Bad, a village in the Agra district of India
- Bad, Uttar Pradesh, a census town in India
- Bād, alternate name for Badrud, a city in Iran
- Bad River (disambiguation), various rivers

== Transport ==
- Banstead railway station, Surrey, England (National Rail station code)
- Barksdale Air Force Base, Bossier City, Louisiana, US (IATA airport code BAD)

== Other uses ==
- Bad (economics), the opposite of a good
- Bad (cuneiform), a cuneiform sign
- Little Miss Bad, a character in the Little Miss series of books by Roger Hargreaves
- Banda languages, spoken in Central Africa (ISO 639-2 and -5 codes "bad")
- Bipolar affective disorder
- Turkish cold bulgur soup, also known as Bad (Bat) in Turkish

== See also ==
- BADD (disambiguation)
- List of people known as the Bad
- Bad 25, 2012 special 25th anniversary edition of the Michael Jackson album Bad
- Bad 25 (film), a 2012 documentary film about the Michael Jackson album
