= Matthew Good (disambiguation) =

Matthew Good is a Canadian singer-songwriter.

Matthew Good may also refer to:

- Matthew W. Good, Pennsylvania politician
- Matt Good, American guitarist and vocalist for From First to Last

== See also ==
- Matthew Goode (born 1978), British actor
- Matthew Goode and Co South Australian business house
- Goode (surname)
