= District Council of Payneham =

District Council of Payneham refers to either of the following:

- City of Campbelltown, South Australia from 1854 to 1868
- City of Payneham, South Australia, from 1883 to 1945
