= Steven Thomas Fischer =

American film director and producer

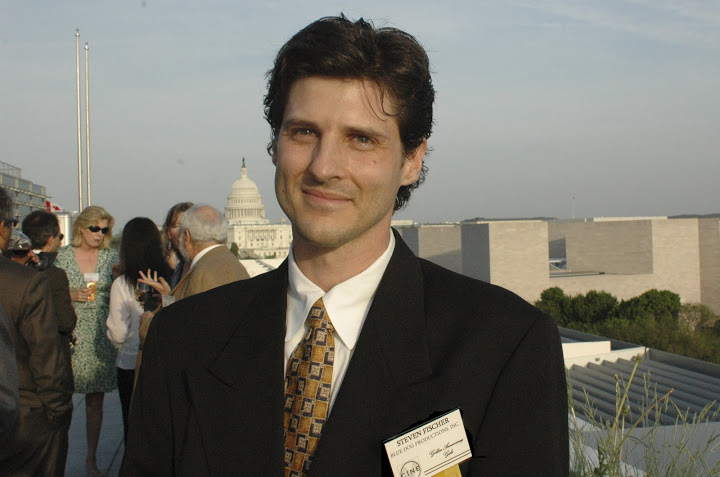
- Steven Fischer at the 50th CINE Awards show, Washington, DC, 24 April 2008.
- Born: June 10, 1972 (age 54); Baltimore, Maryland, U.S.
- Education: University of Maryland, Baltimore County
- Occupations: Director; producer; writer; cartoonist; animator
- Website: www.stevenfischer.net www.steveandbluey.com

Steven Thomas Fischer is an American film director, producer, and cartoonist. His work has been honored by the Directors Guild of America, The New York Festivals, the CINE Golden Eagle Awards, and Marquis Who's Who in Entertainment.

== Career ==
Fischer began his career at age 17 as a cartoonist, writing and illustrating freelance. One of his early writing credits is as a contributing writer for Access Budget Europe (1994) published by HarperCollins. In 1991, Fischer moved to London, England and attended classes at the London Cartoon Centre while developing proposals for animated films and television programs. Most notable were his Steve & Bluey cartoons which later aired in America through TCI Communications of Baltimore. The cartoons revived a vaudevillian style of family entertainment influenced by Fischer's childhood idols, Abbott & Costello. Steve & Bluey featured a young nerdy boy named Steve partnered with a sassy quick-witted blue dog. Much of their humor relied on heavy dialogue and a sharp clash of personalities. Print cartoons were published in two volumes entitled There's a Blue Dog Under My Bed and The Wonderful, Happy, Cartoony World of Steve & Bluey. Radio plays were released through a variety of broadcasters and radio production groups, most notably the Holiday Broadcasting Company and The Golden Radio Players. Fischer voiced both lead characters.

His fiction and non-fiction stories are distinguished by character studies that search for understanding such as the Emmy Award-nominated docu-drama Now & Forever Yours: Letters to an Old Soldier, dramatizing the true story of a secret romance between Major Joseph Willard, a Union officer, and Antonia Ford, a Southern belle, during the American Civil War. Fischer, who served as the writer, producer, director, and cinematographer was nominated in the Photography: Program category at the 50th Annual National Capital Chesapeake Bay Emmy Awards.

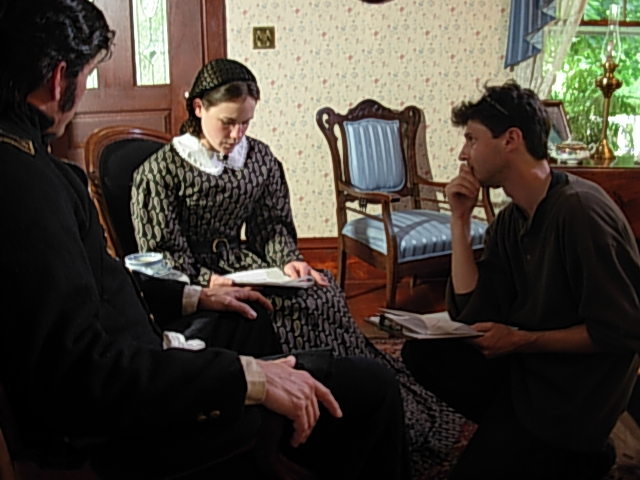
Steven Fischer (right) directing Katie Tschida in Now & Forever Yours: Letters to an Old Soldier.

His 60-second Polish-language public service announcement, Silence of Falling Leaves (which he wrote, produced, and directed for The Polish National Alliance and TCI Communications of Baltimore) was nominated in the Public Service Announcement category at the 43rd Annual Washington, DC Emmy Awards. It aired in Poland through TVP Polonia in 2000. According to the Latvian news portal, TVNet, the film consisted entirely of images of falling autumn leaves with a sound track cut to a narration in Polish by the Warsaw-born artist Bozena Jedrzejczak. The cinematographer was Fischer's longtime friend and collaborator, John Chester. Baltimore Magazine described the multi award-winning PSA as, "an art film trapped inside a commercial."

His personal and artful style of storytelling has been utilized in films for organizations including Maryland Public Television, TV Asia, Nextel/NII Holdings, DuPont, Chicago Symphony Orchestra, National Foundation for Advancement in the Arts, Nalco/Ecolab, and University of Maryland, Baltimore County.

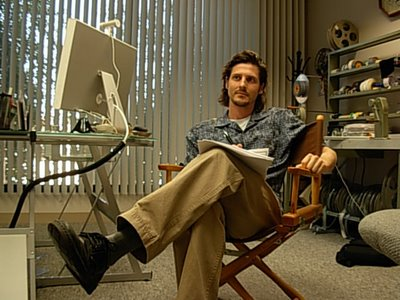
Director Steven Fischer at Bill Melendez Productions, Los Angeles, California, 2009

In 2007, Fischer directed Mariska Hargitay in Freedom Dance, the critically acclaimed animated documentary about the escape of a young couple from Communist Hungary to the United States during the Hungarian Revolution of 1956.

In 2011, he produced and directed Old School New School, a personal study on creativity in which the director, who also appears on camera, crisscrosses the United States to learn about voice, security versus risk, and the meaning of success. The film features the Emmy Award-winning actor Brian Cox, multi Grammy Award-winning jazz pianist McCoy Tyner, Tony Award-winning producer Emanuel Azenberg, and five-time Academy Award-nominated cinematographer William A. Fraker among many other acclaimed artists. The distributor SnagFilms acquired the film in 2011. In 2020, Films Media Group acquired the film as academic distributor.

In 2014, Fischer released an updated version of the Steve & Bluey book The Wonderful, Happy, Cartoony World of Steve & Bluey (originally published in 2002), telling the exploits of a cartoon comedy team trying to make it in animated show business. To promote the release, Fischer launched a world tour offering creativity lectures and cartoon storytelling workshops at venues including Harvard Medical School (Boston), St. John's College Film Institute (Santa Fe, NM), The Second City Training Center (Chicago, IL), Debreceni Egyetemi Színház Theatre Festival (Hungary), on a Transatlantic Crossing as special guest of SeaDream Yacht Club, and as special guest aboard Cunard's Queen Mary 2 touring the Middle East and Southeast Asia.

For George Berlin Studios, Fischer produced the animated Projection mapping films EarthRise Apollo: Moonbeams (2019) and EarthRise Apollo: Lunar Toons (2019), two of three interconnected stories (the third being EarthRise Apollo: Moonwalk) directed by animator George Berlin and inspired by the 50th anniversary of the Apollo 11 Moon landings and projected at light festivals on three continents.

EarthRise Apollo: Moonbeams was projected in Bucharest, Romania, on 21 September 2019. George Berlin Studios was one of only eight teams awarded participation in the iMapp Bucharest International Video Mapping Competition for 2019, sharing the distinction with artists from Italy, the Netherlands, Poland, Spain, Germany, Hungary, Ukraine, and Romania. Using sixty projectors in sync, the films were projected onto the facade of Palace of the Parliament, a screening space 84 m (276 ft) high and 240 m (790 ft) long (approximately 23,000 square meters) to an audience of over 60,000 people.

EarthRise Apollo: Lunar Toons, a whimsical animated short following an imaginative child’s fascination with space travel, projected at BLINK Cincinnati, the largest light and art festival in the United States, October 11-13, 2019 at the GAR Museum, 23 E. Downer Place, during LUMENAURA Fest Weekend.

Throughout 2020, in collaboration with George Berlin Studios, Fischer served as producer of The Scrub Club, a series of animated educational films for National Sanitation Foundation. The series was created in 2005 and teaches children basic health habits. For their re-imagined version of the series, Fischer and director George Berlin secured the voice talents of such notable artists as Kara Edwards (Dragon Ball Z, Hello Kitty: Super Style!), Rowell Gormon (Muppets from Space), and Lindsay Ayliffe (Dolly Parton's Heartstrings).

That same year, Fischer produced Berlin's projection mapping animated short Frida Kahlo: Timeless. The film was produced in support of the Cleve Carney Museum of Art’s exhibit of the same name. The animated short exhibited at "art on the MART” in Chicago, Illinois using 34 projectors to project the animation across the Merchandise Mart's 2.5 acre facade. Originally conceived as “Frida Kahlo 2020,” the exhibit and production were rescheduled June 5 to September 12, 2021 and retitled "Frida Kahlo: Timeless", in response to the COVID-19 pandemic.

Fischer is a co-producer on the award-winning 2024 feature film, Life and Deaths of Max Linder. The film, directed and produced by Edward Porembny, investigates the dramatic rise of Max Linder as one of the world's first international movie stars, his mentorship of Charlie Chaplin, and the double suicide that took the lives of his wife and himself. The film is an international co-production between Poland, France, Belgium, and the United States, and was produced for Telewizja Polska and Canal+ (French TV channel).

Fischer's track record also includes the role of Spencer Stanley in The FBI Files (1999) on the Discovery Channel and directing two music videos for Jim Camacho, former front man for the legendary South Florida rock band The Goods. His international work includes documenting the first Irish National Tour of the critically acclaimed Off-Broadway play Coole Lady, a historical play about the life of Lady Gregory by noted playwright and W. B. Yeats biographer Sam McCready. In 2014, as a Fulbright Program Specialist, Fischer was a teaching artist at University of Debrecen, Hungary, presenting a course on Cartoon Storytelling. He served a second Fulbright Specialist grant award in 2023 as a teaching artist at University of Tokyo.

== Cartoon Storytelling ==
In 2003, Fischer launched Introduction to Cartoon Storytelling, a lifelong learning course that guides adult participants through the creation of personal comics. The course encourages an active use of combining personal experiences, deep reflection, and observation to prompt and develop a personal story. Participants practice observing memories and feelings that emerge inside them as they observe and reflect on the world around them, applying the discoveries to the development of their story. The intention is to use this combination to create meaning to one’s experiences and find understanding in ways that bring clarity and enlightenment to personal struggles.

Fischer has adamantly stated that this initiative is designed to help people “get off the surface of life and dig deep to understand, not judge or criticize, themselves and others.” He adds his desire that participants use cartooning to address what is unaddressed inside them in efforts to reflect and find resolution to inner conflict.

Venues throughout the United States, Asia, and Europe have hosted the course. In 2015, Fischer was invited to speak at Harvard Medical School on the ways autobiographical cartoon storytelling contributes to the healing process. In 2026, the Campus Well-Being Promotion Unit at University of Tokyo played host to Fischer’s autobiographical workshop, A Cartoon Selfie.

Through a variety of international partnerships, Fischer has led the production of several keepsake books collecting personal response comics.

Debrecen Tales: An International Experience (2023, University Press Debrecen) was the result of a collaboration between the City of Debrecen and the University of Debrecen in Hungary. Participants from Tunisia, Myanmar, Hungary, Russia, Kyrgyzstan, and the United States created original comics intent on finding clarity, understanding, and meaning to their experience in war, pandemic, and social unrest. The residents used their story to also express the meaningful connection they have to the city.

Friendship Is… (2024) was produced in collaboration with University of Tokyo, and brought together participants from Japan, Singapore, and the U.K. reflecting on the importance of friendship: the abuse of friendship, the beauty of friendship, and friendship's relation to identity. The cover art was created by veteran artist Yuji Nakao, and the production included Pokémon animator/director, Hiroko Kazui, as guest presenter.

Several other keepsake books have also been collected:

Tooniversity Vol. 1 (2003) Anne Arundel Community College

Tooniversity Vol. 2 (2004) Maryland Hall for the Creative Arts

Tooniversity Vol. 3 (2004) Roland Park Country School

Tooniversity Vol. 4 (2004) Maryland Hall for the Creative Arts

Debreceni Cartoon (2014) University of Debrecen / Fulbright

Stories From Our Youth (2018) Virtue Praise International Education

Katong! Katong! (2019) Virtue Praise International Education

Writing with Class (2020) Virtue Praise International Education

Tokyo Cartoon Vol. 1 (2021) The University of Tokyo

Tokyo Cartoon Vol. 2 (2022) The University of Tokyo

Tokyo Cartoon Vol. 3 (2023) The University of Tokyo / Fulbright

Debrecen Tales: An International Experience (2023) University of Debrecen Press

Friendship Is… (2024) The University of Tokyo

The Boy Loves to Sing (2025) The University of Tokyo

Shadow Speak (2026) The University of Tokyo

== Accolades and Honors ==
In 1996, Fischer was accepted into the Directors Guild of America with the promotional film production This is CLEARCorps, for and about AmeriCorps.

In 1997, Marquis Who's Who selected Fischer for inclusion in Marquis Who's Who in Entertainment.

In 2010, The Daily Record named Fischer as one of 60 Influential Marylanders.

In 2013 and 2022, Fischer was awarded the honor of Fulbright Specialist by the Fulbright Program, The U.S. Department of State's Bureau of Educational and Cultural Affairs and the Council for International Exchange of Scholars. He served in 2014 at the University of Debrecen in Hungary, and in 2023 at the University of Tokyo in Japan.

Fischer served as a Jury Chair for the CINE Awards in 2010, 2011, and 2012, and was named a jury member in 2014 and 2015. He was named as a member of the jury for the Academy Awards qualifier Chicago International Children's Film Festival in 2012, 2013, 2014, and 2016. In 2017, he was Jury Chair of the CICFF's Animated Shorts category.

== Select Film Awards ==
- Silence of Falling Leaves (2000, TCI Communications)
  - Emmy Award (Nomination)
  - The New York Festivals (Finalist, Cinema and Television Advertising Awards)
  - Telly Award (Winner, Public Service Announcement)
  - Addy Award (Nomination)
- Camp Med (2005, NVCC-TV)
  - Telly Award (Winner, Informational Programming)
  - The Videographer Awards (Winner, Award of Distinction)
- Houdini (2005, Broken Records)
  - Telly Award (Winner, Music Video)
  - Gold Remi Award (Winner, Music Video, World Fest International Film Fest, Houston, Texas)
  - Great Lakes Film Festival, Pennsylvania (Official Selection)
- Draw the Line: An Animator's Showcase (2006, NVCC-TV)
  - CINE Golden Eagle (winner, Documentary Short)
  - Telly Award (Winner, Arts & Leisure Programming)
  - Gold Remi Award (Winner, Documentary, World Fest International Film Fest, Houston, Texas)
- Now & Forever Yours: Letters to an Old Soldier (2007, NVCC-TV)
  - Telly Award (Winner, Cinematography)
  - Emmy Award (Nomination, Cinematography)
- Francis Scott Key: Legacy of a Life in Service (2007, ADG Creative)
  - Telly Award (Winner, History/Biography)
  - Independent Film Festival, Maryland (Official Selection)
- Freedom Dance (2007, Blue Dog Productions, Inc / Herron Designs)
  - Rosebud Film Festival, Virginia (Winner, Best of Show)
  - Peer Award (Winner, Documentary Under 30 Minutes)
  - CINE Golden Eagle
  - CINE Jury Award
  - CINE Masters Series Award
  - Boston Motion Picture Awards (Finalist)
  - Frozen Moon 2006 Trailer Showdown, Wales, UK (Winner)
  - Show Off Your Shorts Film Fest, Los Angeles (Nominated for Best Documentary)
- Belvoir (2008, ADG Creative)
  - Telly Award (Winner, Documentary)
  - Independent Film Festival, Maryland, May 2008 (Official Selection)
