= Baddie =

Baddie(s) or baddy may refer to:

== Music ==
- "Baddie" (song), a 2023 song by Ive
- Baddies (band), a British rock band

== Television ==
- "The Baddies" (Goodies episode), an episode of British TV show The Goodies, 1972
- Baddies (TV series), an American reality webshow

== Other uses ==
- The Baddies (professional wrestling), AEW tag team
- Baddy or baddie, an informal term for a villain
- Baddie or baddy, slang for someone attractive

== See also ==
- Bad (disambiguation)
- Baddiewinkle, Helen Ruth Elam (1928–2025), an American Internet personality
