= Hugh Good =

Hugh Good may refer to:

- Hugh Good (rugby union) (1871–1941), New Zealand rugby union player and athlete
- Hugh Good (footballer) (1901–1958), Scottish footballer
