= John Good =

John or Jack Good may refer to:

- I. J. Good (1916–2009), known as Jack, British statistician and cryptanalyst
- Jack Good (producer) (1931–2017), British television, theatre and music producer
- John Good (footballer) (1933–2005), English footballer
- John Good (Irish politician) (died 1941), Irish politician and company director
- John F. Good (1936–2016), FBI agent who created the Abscam sting operation
- John G. Good (born 1926), Pennsylvania politician
- John Jay Good (1827–1882), mayor of Dallas
- John Mason Good (1764–1827), English writer on medical, religious and classical subjects
- John R. Good (1815–1878), North Carolina politician

== See also ==
- John Goode (disambiguation)
- Johnny B. Goode, 1958 song by Chuck Berry
- John the Good (disambiguation)
