= William Good =

William Good may refer to:

- William Good (Jesuit) (1527–1586), English Jesuit
- William Charles Good (1876–1967), Canadian politician
- William L. Good or Bill Good (1910–2007), American weightlifter

== See also ==
- William Goode (disambiguation)
- William the Good (disambiguation)
