= Old School New School =

- Directed by: Steven Fischer
- Written by: Steven Fischer
- Produced by: Steven Fischer; Diane Leigh Davison
- Starring: Brian Cox; McCoy Tyner
- Cinematography: Chris Cassidy, Phil Rosensteel, Scott Uhlfelder
- Edited by: Steven Fischer
- Music by: Michael Zampi
- Production companies: Blue Dog Productions, Inc.
- Distributed by: Snag Films and Films Media Group
- Release date: June 12, 2011
- Running time: 33 minutes
- Country: United States
- Language: English

Old School New School is an educational documentary film that examines the nature of creativity. It is produced by Steven Fischer and Diane Leigh Davison.

The movie started filming in 2007 and was completed in 2010, shooting on location in Los Angeles, New York, Maryland, and Virginia. In 2011, the film was acquired for distribution by Snag Films. The International Documentary Association in Los Angeles, California, is the fiscal sponsor. Films Media Group acquired the film in 2020.

== Synopsis ==
An independent filmmaker travels the United States in search of meaningful conversations with world-renowned artists on the nature of creativity and how a person can realize his or her full creative potential. The movie is divided into three central themes: finding your voice, security versus risk, and the definition of success in the arts.

== Cast ==
- Brian Cox, actor of Manhunter, Braveheart, The Bourne Identity.
- William Fraker, cinematographer of Rosemary's Baby, Bullitt, WarGames.
- Emanuel Azenberg, Broadway producer known for Rent, Biloxi Blues, Brighton Beach Memoirs.
- Kirstie Simson, dance artist.
- James Ragan, poet most noted for Womb Weary.
- Sam McCready, playwright and scholar.
- Ben Jones, actor known for The Dukes of Hazzard.
- John Bailey, cinematographer known for American Gigolo, How to Lose a Guy in 10 Days, The Big Chill.
- McCoy Tyner, jazz musician, member of The John Coltrane Quartet.
- Tomas Arana, actor known for The Last Temptation of Christ, The Hunt for Red October, Gladiator.
- Steven Fischer, filmmaker of Freedom Dance featuring Mariska Hargitay.
