= Good (surname) =

Good is an English surname. Notable people with the name include:

- Adolphus Clemens Good (1856–1894), American missionary and natural history specimen collector
- Andrew Good (born 1979), American baseball player
- Art Good, American radio disc jockey
- Bill Good (born 1945), Canadian television personality and radio talk show host
- Carolynne Poole (née Good) (born 1980), English singer-songwriter
- Dorothy Good (c. 1687/1688–?), young child accused of being a witch, daughter of Sarah
- Eileen Good (1893–1986), Australian architect
- Ernst Good (born 1950), Swiss alpine skier
- Herman James Good (1887–1969), Canadian Victoria Cross recipient
- Hugh Good (footballer) (1901–1958), Scottish footballer
- I. J. Good (1916–2009), British statistician
- James Isaac Good (1850–1924), American Reformed church clergyman and historian
- James William Good (1866–1929), American politician, Secretary of War
- Jo Good (born 1978), British radio host
- JoAnne Good (born 1955), British broadcaster and actress
- John Mason Good (1764–1827), English writer on medical, religious and classical subjects
- Jonathan Good (born 1985), American wrestler better known as Jon Moxley
- La'Myia Good (born 1979), American singer and actress
- Linda Good (fl. 1996–present), songwriter, producer, keyboardist, singer and television and film composer
- Margaret Good (born 1976), American politician
- Mary L. Good (1931–2019), American chemist and educator
- Matthew Good (born 1971), Canadian rock musician
- Meagan Good (born 1981), American actress
- Michael T. Good (born 1962), American astronaut
- Nathan Good (born 1975), drummer, Death Cab for Cutie
- Renee Good (born 1985), Canadian-American television host and personality better known as Renee Young
- Renée Nicole Good (1988–2026), American poet and writer
- Rita Good (born 1951), Swiss alpine skier
- Sarah Good (1653–1692), one of the first three people to be hanged as a result of the Salem witch trials
- Thomas Good (1609–1678), English academic and clergyman, master of Balliol College
- Thomas Good (merchant) (c. 1822–1889) draper and wholesaler of South Australia
- Victoria Good, birth name of BBC Weather forecaster Tori Lacey
- Wilbur Good (1885–1963), American baseball player

== Fictional characters ==
- Mr. Good, a Mr. Men novel series character created by Roger Hargreaves
- Tom and Barbara Good, central characters of the British sitcom The Good Life

== See also ==
- List of people known as the Good
- Goode (name), a surname
- Gooder, a surname
