= Goodan =

Goodan is a surname. Notable people with the surname include:

- Charles Goodan, American singer-songwriter
- Kevin Goodan, American poet and professor

== See also ==
- Gooden
