= Corporate Town of St Peters =

Local government area in South Australia

Coordinates: 34°54′38″S 138°37′34″E

The former Corporate Town of St Peters

The Corporate Town of St Peters was a local government area in South Australia from 1883 to 1997.

It was proclaimed on 2 August 1883, when the area was separated from the District Council of Stepney due to differing interests between the rapidly-growing St Peters area, which contained five-eighths of the Stepney council's ratepayers, and slower-growing suburbs further east. It was divided into four wards (Hackney, East Adelaide, Stepney and Maylands), each represented by two councillors, alongside a directly elected mayor. The council initially met at the Bucks Head Hotel (later the Avenues Hotel), but rapidly sought a town hall due to a lack of office accommodation, and the St Peters Town Hall was built in 1885 at a cost of approximately £3,000, formally opening on 8 March 1886.

The council undertook an important local role in social welfare during the Great Depression, and from the 1960s had to deal with planning issues surrounding the Playford government's Metropolitan Adelaide Transport Study, the Dunstan government's Hackney Redevelopment Scheme, and in the late 1970s and 1980s, the Adelaide O-Bahn, the latter which met local opposition over noise and its impact on the Torrens Gorge. It also developed zoning regulations protecting the character of the local area as a "low and medium density house-and-garden town". In later years, the council also built a new library, incorporating the former post office building, and the St Peters River Park by the River Torrens.

In 1981, the council was responsible for an area of 3.7 square kilometres, with a population of 8,458, down from a peak of 12,522 in 1947.

The Town of St Peters ceased to exist on 1 November 1997, when it amalgamated with the City of Kensington and Norwood and the City of Payneham to form the City of Norwood Payneham & St Peters. The historic town hall and attached 1912 banquet hall are listed on the South Australian Heritage Register.

== Mayors of St Peters ==
- Joseph Bertram (1884–1885)
- Beaumont Arnold Moulden (1891)
- R Cruickshank (1906), appointed to board of Municipal Tramways Trust
- John Ford (1914–1916)
- Victor Wilson (1916–1917)
- Albert Sutton (1923–1926)
- Ernest Hannaford (1926–1928)
- Fred Stacey (1928–1932)
- Frank Perry (1932–1933)
- John Ford (1933–1937)
- Ernest Hannaford (1937–1942)
- Horace Edgar Dunstone (1942–1945)
- Gilbert Ince Mellor (1945–1952)
- Charles Cyril Alexander Ring (1952–1954)
- Laurence Llewellin Davey (1954–1956)
- John Freeman Murray Brooker (1956–1957)
- Lindsay Gordon Perriam (1957–1964)
- Edward Walter Stanford (1964–1966)
- Kenneth Tomkinson (1966–1972)
- Arthur Wellesley Clark (1972–1974)
- Max Arthur Otto (1974–1980)
- Marjorie Miriam Fitz-Gerald (1980–1983)
- William Obed Gibberd (1983-?)

== Notable councillors ==
- Agnes Goode
