= Jim Camacho =

- Born: James Emanuel Camacho; Miami, Florida, United States
- Occupation: Musician
- Website: www.jimcamacho.com

James Emanuel Camacho is an American singer/songwriter and former front man for the rock group The Goods.

== The Goods (1989–1999) ==
The Goods were an American rock band formed in Miami in 1989. The band comprised Jim Camacho (lead vocals/bass/guitar), John Camacho (lead vocals/piano), Tony Oms (guitar/bass/vocals), Kasmir Kujawa (drums/vocals). Camacho, along with his brother John, founded the group on 13 January 1989. In 1998, legendary producer Tom Dowd produced their major label release, Good Things Are Coming.

Throughout the 1990s, the band released five albums including the rock opera 5 Steps to Getting Signed, in 1992, which won the prestigious "Album of the Year" honors at the Florida Jammy Awards. The single "I'm Not Average", from their critically acclaimed 1995 album Mint, reached number one on the Radio & Record charts in Florida and eventually led to a signing with Blackheart Records, a division of Polygram Records.

In 1989, the band made headlines in the Miami Herald and on the TV news program Inside Story when they began tossing condoms into audiences from stage in a public display of joining the fight against AIDS.

A one-hour biographical documentary directed by Miguel Delgato aired on VH1 on October 8, 1998.

In 1999, The Goods appeared on The Jenny Jones Show in episode 8122, "I'm Too Sexy to Get a Date."

The Goods disbanded in 1999.

Marilyn Manson, who got his first break as The Goods' opening act, commented: "I think that they are extremely talented and great musicians."

== Solo career ==
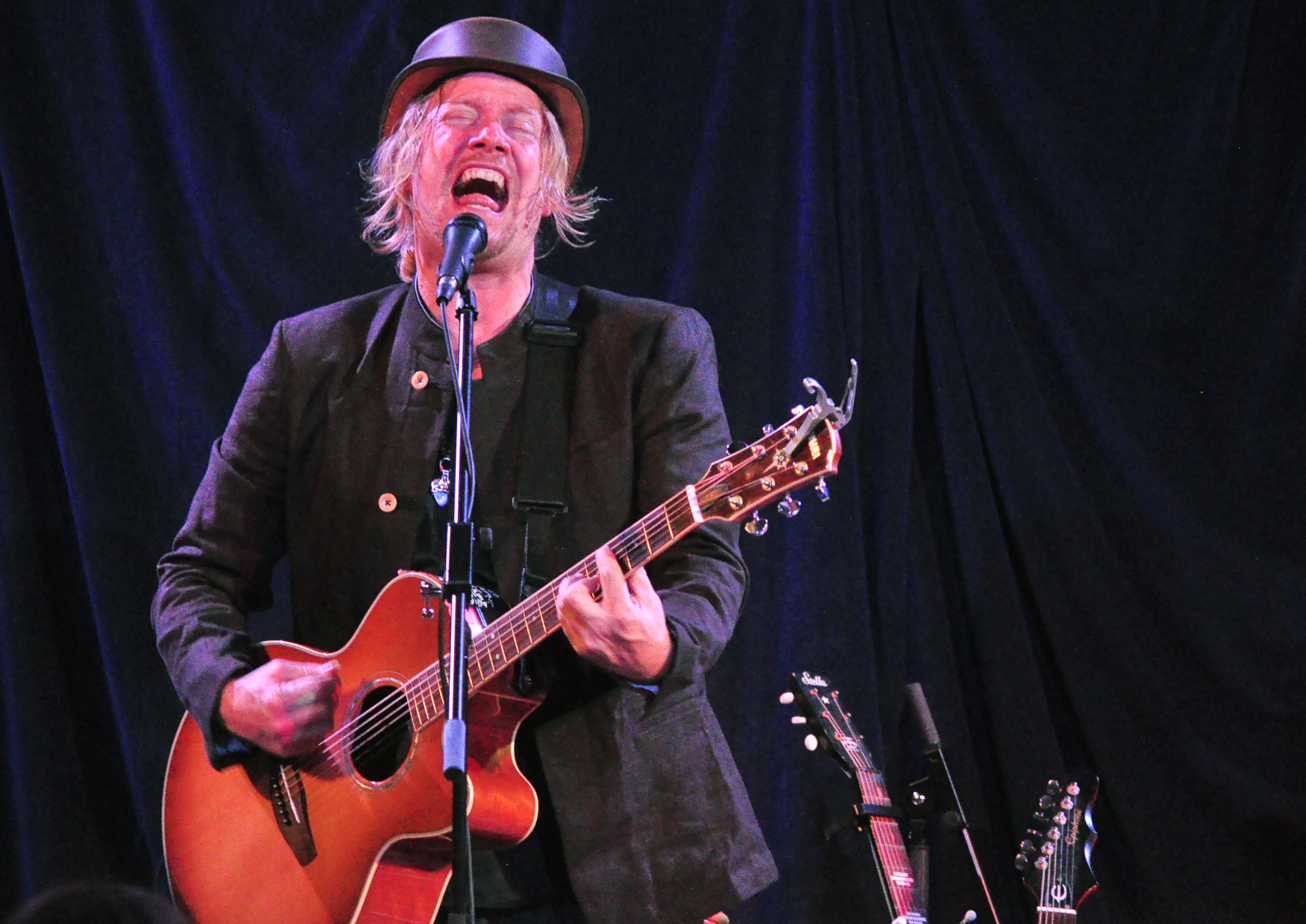
Jim Camacho at the Fremont Abbey in Seattle, 2014

After The Goods disbanded in 1999, Camacho resumed his career as a solo artist and has released multiple albums to critical acclaim including: Trouble Doll (2001), Hey Hey* (2003), Stalker Songs (2005), and Beachfront Defeat (2009). In 2009, Camacho collaborated with Grammy Award-winning songwriter and producer Jodi Marr on the album Hail Mary. Other long time collaborators include Jordan Welch, Fernando Perdomo, Fritz Dorigo, Jimmy Hadzopolis, Tony Oms, Rafael Tarrago, and Rick Finch.

The music video for "Houdini", from the Stalker Songs album, was directed by Emmy-nominated filmmaker Steven Fischer and won the Gold Remi Award in the Music Video category at the 40th Annual WorldFest-Houston International Film Festival and at the 27th Annual Telly Awards in 2006.

On 30 December 2007, "Houdini" had its European premiere on Glimz, the leading Scandinavian video-on-demand service.

In 2005, the Miami New Times listed Camacho as Best Acoustic Performer and included Beachfront Defeat on its list of Best Albums of 2009.

Camacho has performed at Radio City Music Hall, the Kodak Theatre, and the Mirage Hotel, touring with Alicia Keys and John Legend. He has performed on stage with Pearl Jam, The Smithereens, and Cracker & Matthew Sweet.

In 2013, Forward Motion/Broken Records released Camacho's five-song EP, Everywhere, his first collection of new songs since his 2009 critically acclaimed Beachfront Defeat. The Broward Palm Beach New Times named Everywhere one of the top albums of 2013. In the spring of 2014, Jim toured the U.S. West Coast in support of the EP, joining folk legend Linda Perhacs on a series of dates that took him through Oregon, Washington State, California and Nevada as well as several dates in the United Kingdom.

In 2015, Camacho released two singles which were accompanied with videos: "Ophelia" in February and "Please Come Home]" in July. In 2016, he was expected to issue "Make It to the Morning Light" in March and a virtual split 7-inch single with singer / songwriter Rob Elba (Holy Terrors/Shark Valley Sisters). He opened for original Moody Blues member and Paul McCartney and Wings sideman Denny Laine at a March 10 concert in Fort Lauderdale.

== Music in film and television ==
Camacho's music has contributed to several film and television soundtracks including the Grammy-nominated Tom Dowd & the Language of Music and National Lampoon's Pledge This!, and Fatboy, nominated for "Best Use of Music in a Documentary" at the Sundance Film Festival.

His song "I Don't Need You Anymore", from the album Beachfront Defeat, was featured in season 1, episode 4, "Can You Hear Me Now", of the hit ABC family show Pretty Little Liars.

== Musicals ==
Camacho has written several original musicals including Fools Paradise directed by Jonathan Cerullo, Guru, Mickey Herman Saves the $#&@ World which he composed with renowned playwright Marco Ramirez, and the critically acclaimed children's musical The Cavie Islanders & The Troll, a full-length children's musical performed at the Mandelstam Theater in Miami, Florida, in 2011. The score was released on Y&T Records.

In 2012, Camacho composed the songs for noted Disney and Jim Henson puppeteer Noel MacNeal's Who Put The Trick In Trick Or Treat: Tales Of Amazing Tricksters, Beasts of the Magical World (2013), and The Carnival of Extraordinary Animals for the Bronx Zoo's BOO AT THE ZOO CELEBRATION. He co-wrote and scored Guru, which premiered in Miami; scored Mickey Herman Saves the $#&@ World, which premiered at the Adrienne Arsht Center; and wrote the book and music for The Cavie Islanders and the Troll and The Guru of Gir. In 2015, Camacho premiered Digging for Bones, a musical about a group of time-traveling paleontologists and a friendly T-Rex dinosaur skeleton, and enjoyed a third successful run of a collaboration with MacNeal, Mouse King, which has become a new South Florida holiday tradition, enjoying annual, multiple sell-out performances beginning with the 2013 premiere in South Miami's Mandelstam Theatre.

Camacho is credited with writing the book, music & lyrics to Cranky Carl and his Cosmic Contemplations.

In February 2015, Camacho celebrated the 10th anniversary of Fools' Paradise at Churchill's Pub with a well-attended and well-received full musical performance, where virtually the entire original cast was brought back.

In 2026, Camacho wrote the music and lyrics for SOUP the Musical, based on the memoir Mango & Peppercorns about a Vietnamese immigrant and a midwestern woman who founded Hy Vong restaurant in Miami.

== Acting ==
In March 2012, Camacho led the cast at the Mad Cat Theatre Company in RPM, a musical about a club deejay who turns his back on fame and travels the world in search of his true desire.

In 2013, Camacho appeared as Robert Towns in the dramatic film, Father of Mine.

== Discography ==
=== With The Goods ===
- Play Rip Music (1989)
- Too True to be Good (1991)
- 5 Steps to Getting Signed (1992)
- Mint (1995)
- Good Things Are Coming (1998)

=== Solo ===
- Trouble Doll (2001)
- HEY HEY* (2003)
- Stalker Songs (2005)
- Beachfront Defeat (2009)
- Everywhere (2013)
- Ophelia (single, 2015)
- Please Come Home (single, 2015)
- Make It to the Morning Light (single, 2016)

=== Musicals ===
- Mouse King (Book & Additional Lyrics by Noel MacNeal, Music & Lyrics by Jim Camacho)
- Fools' Paradise (Book, Music & Lyrics by Jim Camacho)
- Guru (Book by Jim Camacho & Aymee Garcia, Music by Jim Camacho)
- Mickey Herman Saves the $#&@ World (Book by Marco Ramirez, Music by Jim Camacho)
- The Cavie Islanders & The Troll (Concept by Carol Mandelstam. Book, Music & Lyrics by Jim Camacho)
- Who Put The Trick in Trick or Treat: Tales of Amazing Tricksters (Book by Noel MacNeal, Music by Jim Camacho)
- The Guru of Gir (Book, Music & Lyrics by Jim Camacho)
- Mickey Herman Saves the $#&@ World (Co-Writer, Music by Jim Camacho)
- Digging for Bones (Book, Music & Lyrics by Jim Camacho)
- Beasts of the Magical World (Book and Additional Lyrics by Noel MacNeal, Music & Lyrics by Jim Camacho)
- The Carnival of Extraordinary Animals (Book and Additional Lyrics by Noel MacNeal, Music & Lyrics by Jim Camacho)
- SOUP the Musical (Book by Gil Kaufman, Music & Lyrics by Jim Camacho)
