= City of Kensington and Norwood =

City of Kensington and Norwood South Australia
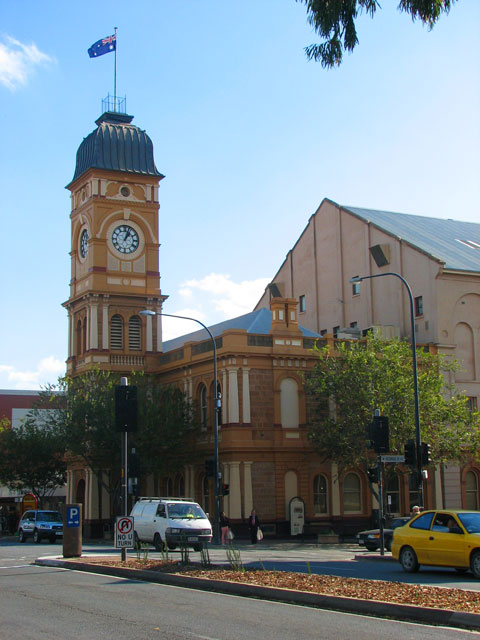
- Norwood Town Hall, formerly the council headquarters

- Coordinates: 34.920940°S 138.636433°E
- Established: 1853
- Abolished: 1997
- Area: 3.92 km^{2} (1.5 sq mi)
- Council seat: Norwood
LGAs around City of Kensington and Norwood:
St Peters	Stepney/ Payneham	Stepney/ Payneham
Adelaide	City of Kensington and Norwood	Burnside
Adelaide	Burnside	Burnside

The City of Kensington and Norwood, originally the Corporate Town of Kensington and Norwood, was a local government area in South Australia from 1853 to 1997, centred on the inner eastern Adelaide suburbs of Kensington and Norwood. In November 1997 it amalgamated with the City of Payneham and the Town of St Peters to form the City of Norwood Payneham & St Peters.

== History ==
It was proclaimed on 7 July 1853 as the Corporate Town of Kensington and Norwood, covering the then villages of Kensington, Norwood and Marryatville. The town extent was defined as sections 260, 261, 276, 277, 289, and 290 of the Hundred of Adelaide, corresponding to land beside First Creek and Second Creek enclosed by the modern suburbs of Norwood, Marryatville, Kensington and Heathpool. It was the first municipal corporation in South Australia after the City of Adelaide.

The council was divided into three wards at its inception: West Norwood, East Norwood and Kensington. Charles Bonney was unanimously elected as the first mayor.

On 18 September 1856, it gained Kent Town from the District Council of Burnside, which was then incorporated as Kent Ward. This was the only change ever made to the council's boundaries. These boundaries were defined as Dequetteville Terrace, Kensington Road, Portrush Road, the southern and eastern boundaries of section 290, Shipster's Road, East Parade, Kensington Terrace (as a section of Portrush Road between Kensington and Norwood was then named), Magill Road, and North Terrace. In 1878, the municipality had a population of 6500, which had doubled by the mid-1880s.

The original Kensington and Norwood Town Hall was built in 1859 and demolished in 1897. The present Norwood Town Hall was opened in 1883, and received extensive additions in 1914. The council undertook a significant program of tree planting in its early years, and managed three municipal plantations. In 1905, the council was given Norwood Oval as a gift in trust, and managed it thereafter.

It was granted city status on 7 July 1953, the date of its centenary, becoming the City of Kensington and Norwood. The council elected its first woman member, Pamela Meade, in 1975. In 1977, it adopted a general policy "to preserve the historic character of the City", and undertook a heritage survey in 1980; in the mid-1980s it was reported to have "the greatest density of heritage buildings [per hectare] recognised by heritage authorities in the state".

In 1985, it was responsible for an area of 3.92 square kilometres, with a population of approximately 9,500, having declined from a peak of 17,000 in the mid-1950s. It had a budget of only $3 million in that year. Each of the four wards was represented by two councillors, with four aldermen representing the whole council area and a directly elected mayor. 23% of the population was over the age of 65 – the second-highest in metropolitan Adelaide. The council sponsored the Christmas Pageant and Mardi Gras each November, the second-largest in South Australia. It also operated a swimming pool complex and a caravan park.

The council had been deemed to be too small for economic survival as early as the 1970s, and on 1 November 1997 it amalgamated with the City of Payneham and the Town of St Peters to form the City of Norwood Payneham & St Peters.

== Mayors ==
- Charles Bonney (1853–1858)
- F. B. Carlin (1858–1860)
- F. N. Scarf (1860–1861)
- T. Taylor (1861–1862)
- D. Fisher (1864–1865)
- William Buik (1865–1867)
- Edwin Thomas Smith (1867–1870, 1871–1873)
- M. Kingsborough (1870–1871)
- H. Hughes (1873–1875)
- Samuel Dening Glyde (1875–1878)
- David Packham (1878–1880)
- Thomas Caterer (1880–1882)
- K. St.B. Miller (1882–1884)
- J. Bennetts (1884–1885)
- F. H. Wigg (1885–1886)
- G. E. C. Stevens (1886–1888)
- Thomas Gepp, jun. (1888–1890)
- James Hall (1890–1892)
- Thomas White (1892–1895)
- Robert K. Threlfall (1895–1897)
- Alfred Binks (1897–1899)
- William Story (1901–1903)
- J. H. Mattingly (1899–1901)
- William Story (1901–1903)
- H. J. Holden (1903–1907)
- George Henry Prosser (1907–1912)
- H. J. Holden (1912–1916)
- Edgar Henry Limbert (1916–1918)
- Nat Solomons (1918–1920) (Note: Nat Solomons (1858–1943) was a London-born tobacco merchant, who became interested in the movie industry and was chair of the Greater Wondergraph Company in the 1910s. He served as an alderman and councillor before his term as mayor.)
- P. Gannoni (1920–1922)
- William Essery Snr (1922–1925)
- J. J. Woods (1925–1928)
- D. P. Thomas (1928–1930)
- William Speakman Hanson (1930–1937)
- H. B. Dankel (1937–1939)
- Albert William George Martens (1939–1942)
- William Essery Jnr (1942–1946) (Note: William Essery Jnr officiated at the opening of the Odeon Theatre, Norwood, in May 1923.)
- Roy Moir (1946–1951)
- Frank William Nelson White (1951–1958)
- Frederick John McCallum (1958–1963)
- Jeffery Humphris Cashmore (1963–1967)
- Reginald Nurse (1967–1971)
- John Douglas Richards (1971–1980)
- Raymond Gabriel Rolland (1980–1981)
- Brian Polomka (1981–1982)
- John Douglas Richards (1982–1985)
- Martin Grant Jones (1985–1987)
- John Pitts Redwood (1987–1989)
- John Douglas Richards (1989–1991)
- Vini Ciccarello (1991–1997)

== Other notable figures ==
- George Ernest Hamilton – inaugural councillor
- Lionel Hill – councillor in the late 1950s
- C. Harrie Gooden – assistant town clerk and valuator
- George Searcy – auditor for 37 years

== See also ==
- District Council of East Torrens
