= Gooden =

Gooden is a surname. Notable people with the surname include:

- Ahmad Gooden (born 1995), American football player
- Arthur Henry Gooden (1879–1971), British playwright
- Billy Gooden (1923–1998), Canadian ice hockey player
- Carlota Gooden (born 1936), Panamanian sprinter
- C. Harrie Gooden (1867–1905) Australian painter
- Drew Gooden (born 1981), American basketball player
- Drew Gooden (YouTuber) (born 1993), American YouTuber
- Dwight Gooden (born 1964), American baseball player
- John Gooden (1920–1950) Australian physicist
- Lancelot Gooden, Australian architect who worked with Daniel Garlick in Adelaide in the early 20th century
- Sam Gooden (1934–2022), American soul singer, member of The Impressions
- Shannon Gooden, perpetrator of the 2024 Burnsville shooting
- Stacy-Ann Gooden (21st century), American model and journalist
- Stephanie Gooden, American politician
- Stephen Gooden (1892–1955), British artist and engraver
- Tavares Gooden (born 1984), American college football player
- Ty Gooden (born 1972), English footballer

== See also ==
- Goodan
