= Bengt-Eric Hörberg =

Swedish chess player

Personal information
- Born: 9 February 1922 Karlskrona, Sweden
- Died: 2 November 2003 (aged 81) Täby, Sweden

Chess career
- Country: Sweden

Bengt-Eric Hörberg (9 February 1922 – 2 November 2003) was a Swedish chess player, Swedish Chess Championship winner (1954).

== Biography ==
From the early 1950s to the late 1960s, Bengt-Eric Hörberg was one of Sweden's leading chess players. In Swedish Chess Championships he has won gold (1954 - after winning additional match against Royal Goode - 2:1) and silver (1966) medals. Bengt-Eric Hörberg regularly participated in the International Chess tournaments in Stockholm.

Bengt-Eric Hörberg played for Sweden in the Chess Olympiads:

- In 1954, at fourth board in the 11th Chess Olympiad in Amsterdam (+4, =3, -7),
- In 1958, at second reserve board in the 13th Chess Olympiad in Munich (+2, =3, -4).

Bengt-Eric Hörberg played for Sweden in the European Team Chess Championship preliminaries:

- In 1961, at third board (+2, =1, -1),
- In 1961, at fifth board (+1, =0, -4).
