= Badd (disambiguation) =

"Badd" is a 2005 song by the Ying Yang Twins.

Badd may also refer to:

- Badd Giacaman Museum
- Badd Company, a professional wrestling tag team in the American Wrestling Association
- Color Me Badd, an American contemporary R&B group
- Cover Me Badd, an EP by Butch Walker
- B.A.D.D. ("Bothered about Dungeons & Dragons"), Patricia Pulling's anti-satanism campaign that fought against role-playing games such as Dungeons & Dragons
- Badd, mountain location of the ancient Persian fortress of Babak Castle

== See also ==
- Bad (disambiguation)
