= Local government areas of South Australia =

Local government in the Australian state of South Australia describes the organisations and processes by which towns and districts can manage their own affairs to the extent permitted by section 64A of Constitution Act 1934 (SA).

== LGAs sorted by region ==
The organisations, often called local government areas (LGAs) are constituted and managed in accordance with the Local Government Act 1999 (South Australia). They are grouped below by region, as defined by the Local Government Association of South Australia. Maralinga Tjarutja and Anangu Pitjantjatjara Yankunytjatjara aboriginal councils both located in the remote north of the state are by far the largest South Australian LGAs, both exceeding 100,000 km^{2}. Coorong District Council and Loxton Waikerie are the next largest LGAs. The smallest LGAs are Walkerville and then Prospect, both occupying less than 10 km^{2} each.

The area with the largest population growth was Playford in Adelaide's northern suburbs with a net increase of 2,847 people from June 2021 to June 2022. Port Pirie had the largest net reduction in population of 106. The fastest growth of an LGA in South Australia was in Adelaide Plains at 4.9 percent. Coober Pedy was the fastest shrinking LGA, at -3.0 percent.

=== Metropolitan Adelaide ===
This group of areas are found around Metropolitan Adelaide along a 70 km stretch of the Gulf St Vincent coast and up to 50 km inland.

Local government area	Council seat	Year est.	Land area			Population		Notes	Map
Local government area	Council seat	Year est.	km^{2}	sq mi	Density (2022)	2021	2022	Notes	Map
City of Adelaide	Adelaide	1840	16	6	1677	25,551	26,120	Capital city of South Australia; 1840 Established as Adelaide Corporation; 1843 Managed by the Colonial government, and then a commission 1852 Re-established; 1919 Office of Mayor raised to Lord Mayor	
Adelaide Hills Council	Woodside	1997	795	307	52	41,250	41,448	Amalgamation of District Councils of East Torrens, Gumeracha, Onkaparinga and Stirling	
City of Burnside	Tusmore	1856	28	11	1,697	46,444	46,692	1856 gazetted as District Council of Burnside; 1935 became the Municipality of Burnside; 1943 proclaimed the City of Burnside	
City of Campbelltown	Rostrevor	1854	24	9	2,301	55,475	56,013	1854 established as the District Council of Payneham; 1867 District Council of Stepney (later itself called Payneham) seceded 1868 renamed to District Council of Campbelltown; 1946 became the Town of Campbelltown; 1960 proclaimed the City of Campbelltown	
City of Charles Sturt	Woodville	1997	55	21	2,280	123,146	124,906	Amalgamation of City of Hindmarsh Woodville and the City of Henley and Grange	
Town of Gawler	Gawler	1857	41	16	635	25,304	26,123	Established as the Corporation of the Town of Gawler in 1857 following resident dissatisfaction at being governed by three different district councils	
City of Holdfast Bay	Brighton	1997	14	5	2,768	37,868	38,061	Amalgamation of Glenelg and Brighton city councils	
City of Marion	Sturt	1853	56	22	1,737	95,650	96,658	1853 established as the District Council of Brighton; 1886 renamed to the District Council of Marion; 1944 gazetted as the municipality, City of Marion	
City of Mitcham	Torrens Park	1853	76	29	905	68,180	68,403	First LGA formally founded after the City of Adelaide	
City of Norwood Payneham & St Peters	Norwood	1997	15	6	2,516	37,850	38,001	Amalgamation of the City of Kensington and Norwood, the City of Payneham and the Town of St Peters.	
City of Onkaparinga	Noarlunga Centre	1997	518	200	345	176,628	178,546	Amalgamation of Cities of Happy Valley and Noarlunga with part of the District Council of Willunga	
City of Playford	Elizabeth	1997	345	133	300	100,573	103,420	Amalgamation of the cities of Elizabeth and Munno Para	
City of Port Adelaide Enfield	Port Adelaide	1997	92	36	1,480	134,202	135,844	Amalgamation of the cities of Port Adelaide and Enfield	
City of Prospect	Prospect	1872	8	3	2,919	22,497	22,741	Separated from District Council of Yatala South	
City of Salisbury	Salisbury	1933	160	62	926	147,602	148,003	Amalgamation of District Council of Yatala North and large part of District Council of Munno Para West	
City of Tea Tree Gully	Modbury	1858	95	37	1,078	102,067	102,666	1858 established by separation from District Council of Highercombe; 1935 reunited with Highercombe under current name	
City of Unley	Unley	1871	14	5	2,739	39,082	39,085	Separated from District Council of Mitcham as the Corporate Town of Unley	
Town of Walkerville	Gilberton	1855	4	2	2,317	8,091	8,179	Separated from District Council of Yatala	
City of West Torrens	Hilton	1856	37	14	1,702	62,469	63,105	1856 established as the District Council of West Torrens; 1944 became a municipal corporation, the Corporate Town of West Torrens; 1950 gained city status as the City of West Torrens; 1997 annexed the Town of Thebarton	

=== Regional South Australia ===
==== Eyre Peninsula ====
Local government area	Council seat	Year est.	Land area			Population		Notes	Map
Local government area	Council seat	Year est.	km^{2}	sq mi	Density (2022)	2021	2022	Notes	Map
District Council of Ceduna	Ceduna	1896	5,427	2,095	0.7	3,651	3,650		
District Council of Cleve	Cleve	1911	4,507	1,740	0.4	1,776	1,765	Separated from Franklin Harbour	
District Council of Elliston	Elliston	1887	6,500	2,510	0.2	1,038	1,037	Boundary changes in 1989	
District Council of Franklin Harbour	Cowell	1888	3,583	1,383	0.5	1,323	1,323		
District Council of Kimba	Kimba	1924	3,986	1,539	0.2	1,053	1,057		
District Council of Lower Eyre Peninsula	Cummins	1921	4,771	1,842	1.3	6,060	6,100	Part of District Council of Port Lincoln (proclaimed 1880). District Council of Tumby Bay separated in 1906. Corporation of Port Lincoln separated in 1921. Remainder named District Council of Lincoln. Renamed Lower Eyre Peninsula in 1988.	
City of Port Augusta	Port Augusta	1964	1,153	445	12.5	14,453	14,456		
City of Port Lincoln	Port Lincoln	1921	30	12	492.2	14,880	14,947	Separated from District Council of Port Lincoln in 1921. Proclaimed a city in 1971.	
District Council of Streaky Bay	Streaky Bay	1887	6,232	2,406	0.4	2,241	2,254		
District Council of Tumby Bay	Tumby Bay	1906	2,616	1,010	1.1	2,875	2,889	Separated from District Council of Port Lincoln	
City of Whyalla	Whyalla	1970	1,033	399	20.4	21,960	21,894		
Wudinna District Council	Wudinna	1925	5,394	2,083	0.2	1,163	1,164	Established as the District Council of Minnipa. Later renamed as District Council of Le Hunte. Given present name in 2008.	

==== Central region ====
Local government area	Council seat	Year est.	Land area			Population		Notes	Map
Local government area	Council seat	Year est.	km^{2}	sq mi	Density (2022)	2021	2022	Notes	Map
Adelaide Plains Council	Mallala	1935	933	360	11.2	9,977	10,461	Amalgamation of the district councils of Grace, Dublin and Port Gawler	
Barossa Council	Angaston	1996	894	345	29.0	25,569	25,878	Amalgamation of district councils of Angaston, Barossa, Tanunda and, since 1997, part of Mount Pleasant	
District Council of Barunga West	Port Broughton	1997	1,590	614	1.7	2,676	2,676	Amalgamation of the District Council of Bute and the District Council of Port Broughton	
District Council of Clare and Gilbert Valleys	Clare	1997	1,892	731	5.0	9,366	9,393	Amalgamation of the district councils of Clare, Riverton and Saddleworth and Auburn	
Copper Coast Council	Kadina	1997	773	298	20.3	15,336	15,652	Amalgamation of the District Council of Northern Yorke Peninsula and Corporate Town of Wallaroo	
Flinders Range Council	Quorn	1997	4,071	1,572	0.4	1,686	1,682	Amalgamation of the District Council of Kanyaka-Quorn and the District Council of Hawker	
Regional Council of Goyder	Burra	1997	6,715	2,593	0.6	4,138	4,134	Amalgamation of the district councils of Burra Burra Eudunda, Hallet and Robertstown.	
Light Regional Council	Kapunda	1996	1,277	493	12.8	16,083	16,332	Amalgamation of the District Council of Light (1977–1996) and the District Council of Kapunda	
District Council of Mount Remarkable	Melrose	1980	3,423	1,322	0.9	2,921	2,915	Amalgamation of District Council of Port Germein and District Council of Wilmington	
Northern Areas Council	Jamestown	1997	2,986	1,153	1.6	4,659	4,671	Amalgamation of the district councils of Rocky River, Spalding, and Jamestown	
District Council of Orroroo Carrieton	Orroroo	1997	3,322	1,283	0.3	891	890	Amalgamation of the District Council of Orroroo and District Council of Carrieton	
District Council of Peterborough	Peterborough	1935	3,020	1,166	0.6	1,669	1,670		
Port Pirie Regional Council	Port Pirie	1997	1,761	680	10.0	17,754	17,648	Amalgamation of the City of Port Pirie and the District Council of Crystal Brook-Redhill	
Wakefield Regional Council	Balaklava	1997	3,469	1,339	2.0	6,926	6,958	Amalgamation of the District Council of Blyth-Snowtown and District Council of Wakefield Plains	
Yorke Peninsula Council	Maitland	1997	5,900	2,278	2.0	11,828	11,922	Established as the District Council of Yorke Peninsula in 1997 by amalgamation of the district councils of Central Yorke Peninsula, Minlaton, Warooka and Yorketown. Renamed in 2013.	

==== Southern and Hills region ====
Local government area	Council seat	Year est.	Land area			Population		Notes	Map
Local government area	Council seat	Year est.	km^{2}	sq mi	Density (2022)	2021	2022	Notes	Map
Alexandrina Council	Goolwa	1997	1,827	705	16.3	29,257	29,780	Amalgamation of the District Council of Strathalbyn, the District Council of Port Elliot and Goolwa, and a portion of the District Council of Willunga.	
Kangaroo Island Council	Kingscote	1996	4,401	1,699	1.2	4,999	5,084	Amalgamation of the District Council of Kingscote and the District Council of Dudley.	
District Council of Mount Barker	Mount Barker	1853	595	230	69.0	39,627	41,059		
City of Victor Harbor	Victor Harbor	1975	385	149	43.5	16,427	16,720	Amalgamation of District Council of Encounter Bay and the Corporation of Victor Harbor in 1975. Formerly a district council, became a city in 2000.	
District Council of Yankalilla	Yankalilla	1854	751	290	8.0	5,928	5,998		

==== Murray Mallee region ====
Local government area	Council seat	Year est.	Land area			Population		Notes	Map
Local government area	Council seat	Year est.	km^{2}	sq mi	Density (2022)	2021	2022	Notes	Map
Berri Barmera Council	Berri	1996	476	184	22.5	10,747	10,713	Amalgamation of district councils of Barmera and Berri.	
Coorong District Council	Meningie	1995	8,833	3,410	0.6	5,599	5,569	Amalgamation of District Council of Coonalpyn Downs, Peake District Council and Meningie District Council.	
Gerard Community Council	Winkie	1996	85.9	33	1.1	50	50		
District Council of Karoonda East Murray	Karoonda	1979	4,416	1,705	0.2	1,025	1,028	Amalgamation of District Council of Karoonda and District Council of East Murray.	
District Council of Loxton Waikerie	Loxton	1997	7,764	2,998	1.5	11,922	11,928	Amalgamation of district councils of Loxton, Waikerie and Browns Well.	
Mid Murray Council	Mannum	1997	6,272	2,422	1.5	9,355	9,415	Amalgamation of district councils of Mannum, Morgan, Ridley-Truro and part of the District Council of Mount Pleasant.	
Rural City of Murray Bridge	Murray Bridge	1977	1,832	707	12.3	22,348	22,554		
Renmark Paringa Council	Renmark	1996	916	354	11.0	10,009	10,044	Amalgamation of Town of Renmark and the District Council of Paringa.	
Southern Mallee District Council	Pinnaroo	1997	5,702	2,202	0.4	2,029	2,013		

==== Southeast region ====
Local government area	Council seat	Year est.	Land area			Population		Notes	Map
Local government area	Council seat	Year est.	km^{2}	sq mi	Density (2022)	2021	2022	Notes	Map
Kingston District Council	Kingston SE	1873	3,340	1,290	0.7	2,375	2,389	Renamed from Lacepede District Council in 2000.	
City of Mount Gambier	Mount Gambier	1876	34	13	819.4	27,642	27,771		
Naracoorte Lucindale Council	Naracoorte	1993	4,520	1,745	2.0	8,896	8,928	Amalgamation of District Council of Naracoorte, District Council of Lucindale and the Corporate Township of Naracoorte.	
District Council of Robe	Robe	1869	1,092	422	1.5	1,568	1,583		
Southern Limestone Coast Council	Mount Gambier	1996	1,898	733	4.7	8,862	8,925	Amalgamation of District Councils of Mount Gambier and Port MacDonnell.	
Tatiara District Council	Bordertown	1876	6,527	2,520	1.1	7,072	7,040		
Wattle Range Council	Millicent	1997	3,926	1,516	3.1	12,127	12,163	Amalgamation of district councils of Beachport, Millicent and Penola.	

==== Outback ====
Local government area	Council seat	Year est.	Land area			Population		Notes	Map
Local government area	Council seat	Year est.	km^{2}	sq mi	Density (2022)	2021	2022	Notes	Map
Aṉangu Pitjantjatjara Yankunytjatjara	Umuwa	1981	102,353	39,519	0.0	2,554	2,595		
District Council of Coober Pedy	Coober Pedy	1987	78	30	20.3	1,624	1,576		
Maralinga Tjarutja	Ceduna	2006	102,704	39,654	0.0	102	102		
Roxby Council	Roxby Downs	1982	111	43	37.2	4,115	4,105		

==== Unincorporated areas ====
- Unincorporated SA

== Maps ==
Partial map of LGAs

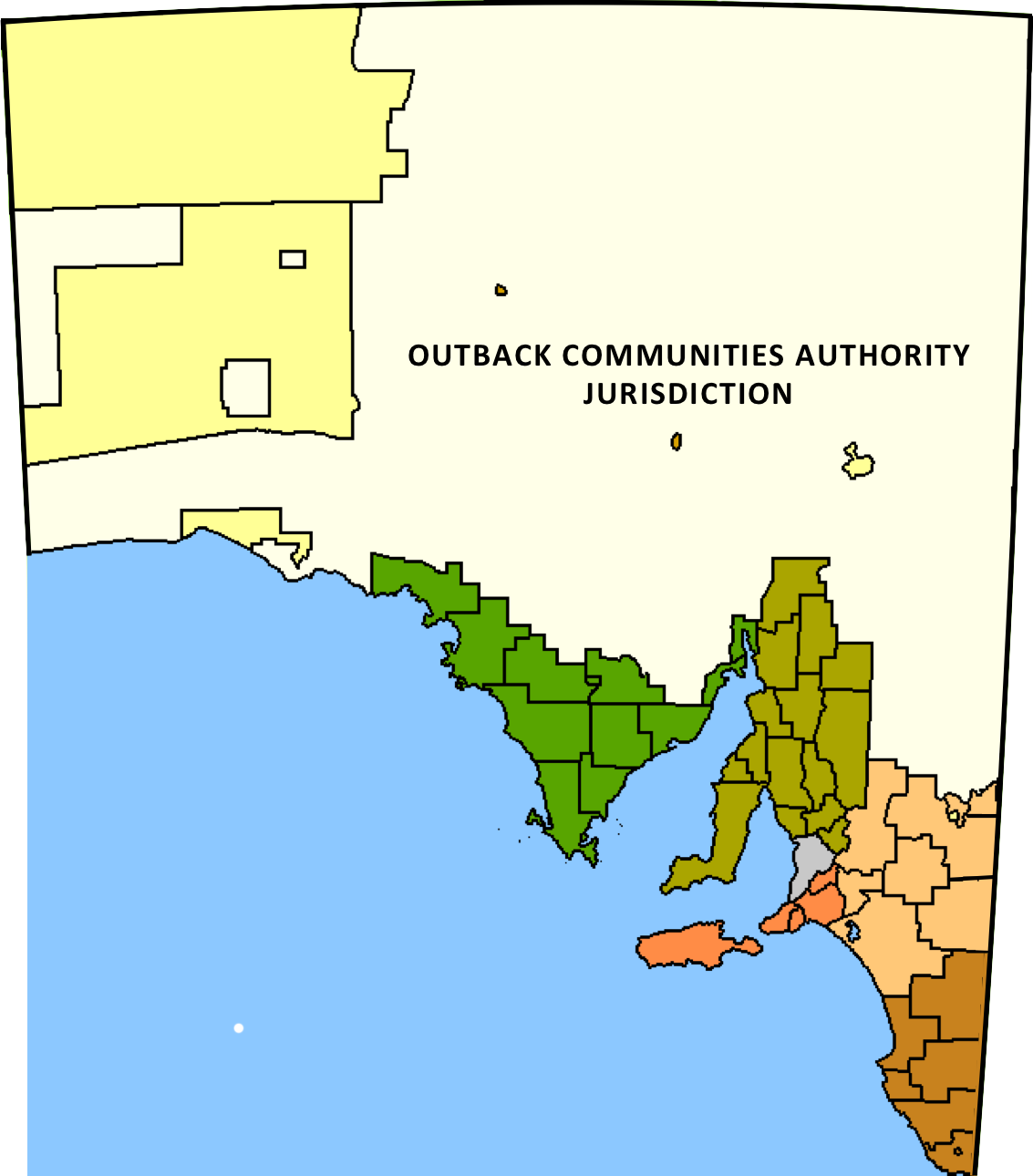
LGA regions

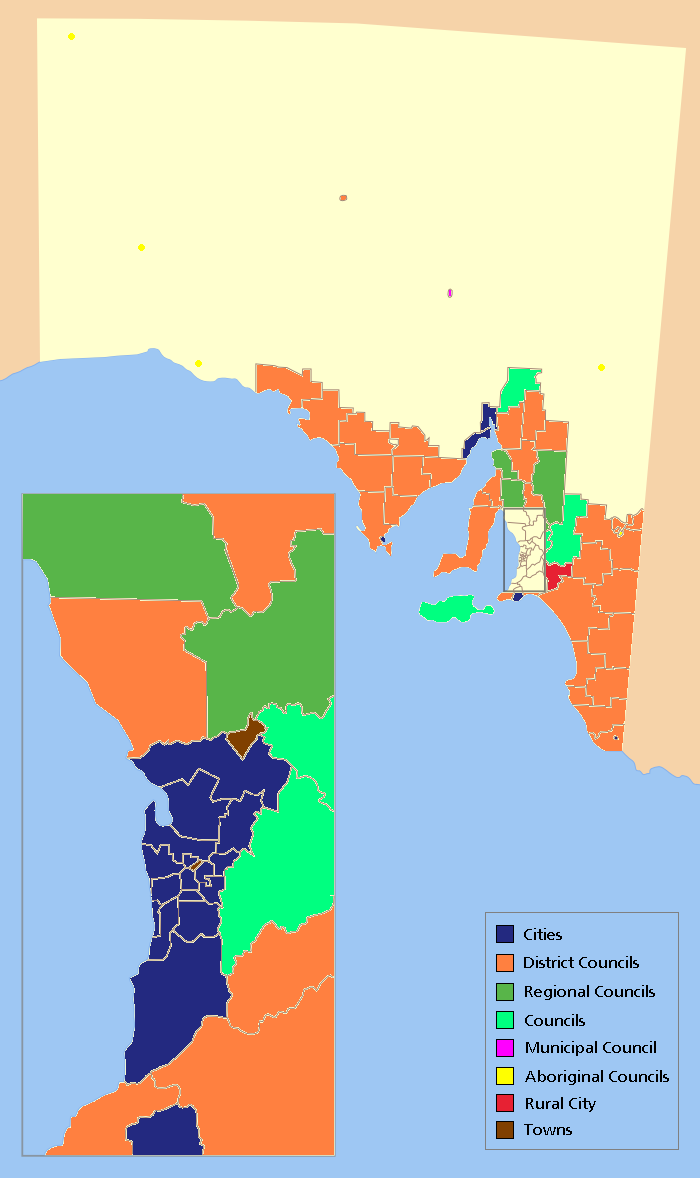
Types of LGAs

== See also ==
- District Councils Act 1887
- List of cities and towns in South Australia
