= Harry Goode =

Harry Goode may refer to:

- Harry H. Goode (1909–1960), American computer engineer and systems engineer
- Harry King Goode (1892–1942), World War I flying ace
- Harry Goode (politician) (1938–2013), American politician from Florida
