= William the Good (disambiguation) =

William the Good, or William II of Sicily (1153–1189), was king of Sicily from 1166 to 1189.

William the Good may also refer to:

- William the Good, Count of Bordeaux (fl. late 10th century)
- William I, Count of Hainaut (c. 1286–1337)
- William the Good (short story collection), a 1928 Just William book by Richmal Crompton

== See also ==
- William Good (disambiguation)
