= Chris Goode =

Chris Goode may refer to:

- Chris Goode (American football) (born 1963)
- Chris Goode (cricketer) (born 1984)
- Chris Goode (playwright) (1973–2021), British playwright, theatre director and performer
