= List of people known as the Bad =

Several historical figures are known by the epithet the Bad:

- Arnulf, Duke of Bavaria (died 937)
- Charles II of Navarre (1332–1387), King of Navarre and Count of Évreux
- George II of Kakheti (1469–1513), King of Kakheti
- Haakon Sigurdsson (c. 937–995), de facto ruler of Norway from about 975 to 995
- William I of Sicily (1131–1166), second King of Sicily

In the spaghetti Western film The Good, the Bad and the Ugly, Lee Van Cleef played the second titled character.

== See also ==
- List of people known as the Good
- List of people known as the Cruel
- Bad (disambiguation)
