= Thomas Good (disambiguation) =

Thomas Good (1609–1678) was an English academic and clergyman.

Thomas Good may also refer to:

- Thomas Sword Good (1789–1872), British painter
- Thomas Good (merchant) (1822–1889), merchant of Adelaide, South Australia
- T. D. Good (1874–1958), Irish badminton player

== See also ==
- Thomas Goode (disambiguation)
