= Dunny Goode =

American football coach (1929–2004)

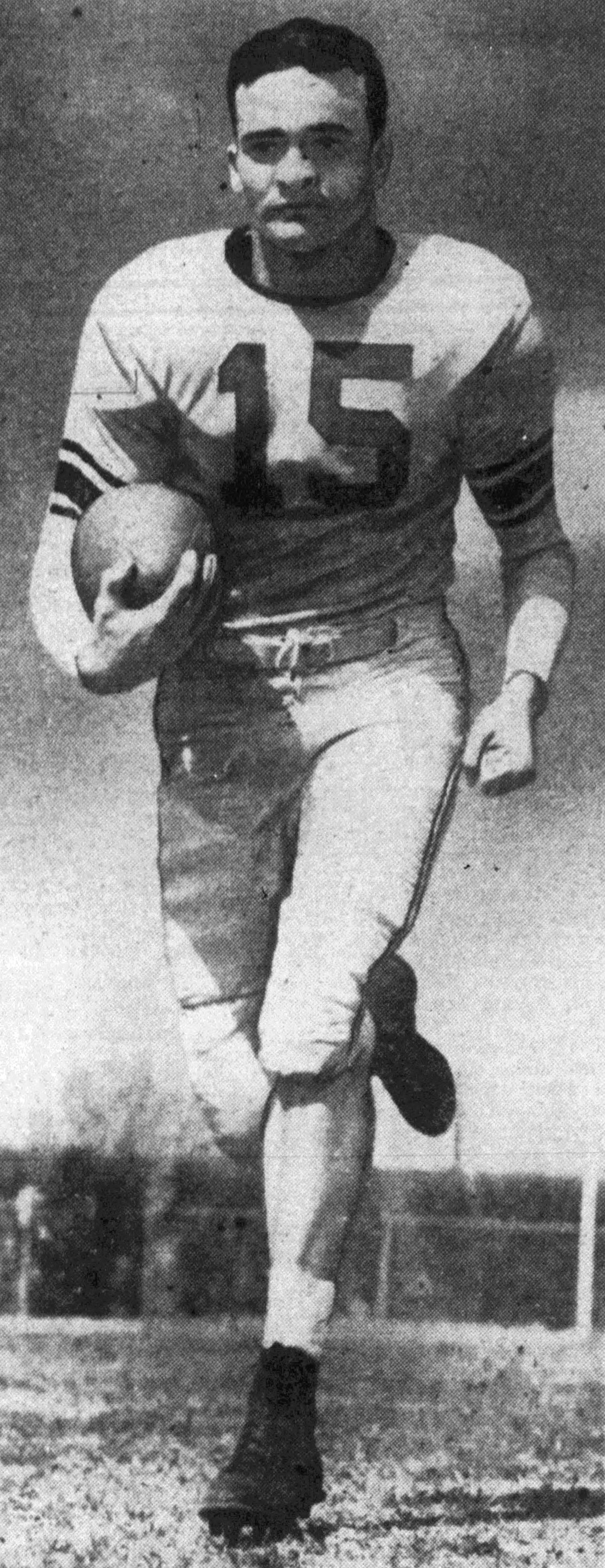
- Goode, circa 1951

Biographical details
- Born: October 24, 1929; Pampa, Texas, U.S.
- Died: June 1, 2004 (aged 74); Clovis, New Mexico, U.S.

Playing career
- 1949–1951: Hardin–Simmons
- Position: Halfback

Coaching career (HC unless noted)
- 1956–1958: Canadian HS (TX) (backfield)
- 1959: Lefors HS (TX) (assistant)
- 1960: Hardin–Simmons (DB/freshmen)
- 1961–1963: Lefors HS (TX)
- 1964: Taft HS (TX)
- 1965–1967: Beeville HS (TX)
- 1968–1971: Canyon HS (TX)
- 1973–1977: Clovis HS (NM)
- 1978–1982: Eastern New Mexico
- 1984: Goddard HS (NM)
- 1985–1987: Farmington HS (NM)
- 1988–1990: Austin HS (El Paso, TX) (assistant)

Head coaching record
- Overall: 21–29–1 (college)

William Frank "Dunny" Goode (October 24, 1929 – June 1, 2004) was an American football player and coach. He was the tenth head football coach for Eastern New Mexico University in Portales, New Mexico, serving for five seasons, from 1978 to 1982, and compiling a record of 21–29–1.

Goode played college football as a halfback at Hardin–Simmons University in Abilene, Texas. As a senior in 1951, he was the second in the nation in rushing yards with 1,399. He was selected by the Washington Redskins in the 26th round of the 1952 NFL draft with the 307th overall pick.

== Coaching career ==
Goode began his coaching career in 1956 as backfield coach at Canadian High School in Canadian, Texas. He spent two years working in the sporting goods business in Andrews, Texas before he was appointed as an assistant coach at Lefors High School in Lefors, Texas. Goode returned to Hardin–Simmons in 1960 as an assistant coach, mentoring the freshman football team and the defensive backfield on the varsity team.

Goode was hired to his first head coaching job at Lefors High School in 1961. After three seasons, he resigned to take the same job at Taft High School in Taft, Texas. The following year, he moved on to Beeville High School in Beeville, Texas.

Goode was the head football coach at Clovis High School in Clovis, New Mexico from 1973 to 1977, compiling a record of 49–14 in five seasons and leading his 1977 squad to the Class AAAA New Mexico state football title.

== Death ==
Goode died on June 1, 2004, at Plains Regional Medical Center in Clovis. He had suffered from Alzheimer's disease and was hospitalized a week prior to his death.

== Head coaching record ==
=== College ===
Year	Team	Overall	Conference	Standing	Bowl/playoffs
Eastern New Mexico Greyhounds (NAIA Division I independent) (1978–1982)
1978	Eastern New Mexico	5–6			
1979	Eastern New Mexico	4–6			
1980	Eastern New Mexico	2–7–1			
1981	Eastern New Mexico	6–4			
1982	Eastern New Mexico	4–6			
Eastern New Mexico:		21–29–1			
Total:		21–29–1			
