= Samuel Goode =

Samuel Goode may refer to:

- Samuel Goode (American politician) (1756–1822), United States representative from Virginia
- Samuel Goode (mayor) (1863–1864), mayor of Adelaide, South Australia
- Sam Goode, character in I Am Number Four
