= Goode =

Goode may refer to:

== Businesses ==
- Goode Brothers (disambiguation)
- GOODE Ski Technologies
- H. A. and W. Goode, regional department store in Australia

== Places in the United States ==
- Goode, Kansas, a ghost town
- Goode, Virginia, an unincorporated community
- Goode Glacier, a glacier in the North Cascades National Park, Washington

== Other uses ==
- Goode (name)
- Goode Solar Telescope, a scientific facility
- Buddy Goode, a fictional character
- Harry H. Goode Memorial Award
- Thomas Goode Jones School of Law

== See also ==
- Good (disambiguation)
- Goodes (disambiguation)
- Goodness (disambiguation)
- Goods (disambiguation)
