= Chris Goode (cricketer) =

English cricketer (born 1984)

Christopher Martin Goode (born 12 October 1984) is an English cricketer who played for Northamptonshire. He was born in Kettering.

Goode made a single first-class appearance, during the 2004 season, against Worcestershire. As a bowler, he scored no runs in the first innings in which he batted, and didn't bat in the second innings. He took 1-70 in the match claiming the wicket of Vikram Solanki. Northamptonshire drew the match.
