= Bad, Uttar Pradesh =

Baad
- Census town
- Location in Uttar Pradesh, India Baad (India)
- Coordinates: 27°24′40″N 77°41′30″E
- Country: India
- State: Uttar Pradesh
- District: Mathura

Population (2001)
  - Total: 14,690

Languages
  - Official: Hindi
- Time zone: UTC+5:30 (IST)
- Postal code: 281006
- Vehicle registration: UP
- Website: up.gov.in

Baad is a census town in Mathura district in the state of Uttar Pradesh, India. It is located on NH2, near Indian Oil corporation and Baad railway station, Mathura refinery Township.

== Demographics ==
As of the 2001 Census of India, Baad had a population of 14,690. Males constitute 53% of the population and females 47%. Baad has an average literacy rate of 76%, higher than the national average of 59.5%. 13% of the population is under 6 years of age.
