= C. Harrie Gooden =

Australian painter

Charles Harrie Gooden (ca.1867 – 10 November 1905) was an artist in South Australia.

== History ==
Harrie was born the eldest son of George William Gooden (ca.1843 – 11 January 1907), Town Clerk of the Town of Kensington and Norwood for 25 years. Harrie was a clerk, surveyor and draftsman in the Civil Service for 19 years, his last appointment being with the Woods and Forests Department, then Assistant Town Clerk and valuator for the Town of Kensington and Norwood. He was also secretary to the East Torrens County Board of Health.

He was a student and protègé at James Ashton's art school in Norwood, and acted as his secretary for his Art Unions of 1892, 1897 and 1899, as well as supplying some of the minor prizes. He was a founding member of the Adelaide Easel Club and its hon. secretary, then a board member of the Society of Arts, and was officer of examinations for the Royal Drawing Society.

He was severely injured when his car left the road on the way to Milang and died three weeks later. His companions were unharmed.

== Family ==
Harrie had a younger brother Ernest O. Gooden, who succeeded his father as Town Clerk.

Harrie married Sara "Tott" Stokes (ca.1866 – 10 October 1954) on 6 October 1897; they had a home at Magill Road, Norwood.

- Lancelot Harrie Leighton "Lance" Gooden (8 July 1898 – 17 March 1897) married Peg Lawton in 1935. He was an Adelaide architect.
- Charles Harrie Gooden (13 May 1906 – ) married Nesse Mander Tyson on 26 October 1935; they had a home at Woolridge Avenue, Millswood
