= William Goode (priest) =

English evangelical cleric (1801–1868)

William Goode the younger (1801–1868) was an English cleric, a leader of the evangelicals of the Church of England and from 1860 the Dean of Ripon.

== Life ==
The son of the Revd William Goode, the elder, he was born on 10 November 1801 and educated at St Paul's School, London, and Trinity College, Cambridge. He graduated BA in 1825 with a first class in classics.

Goode was ordained deacon and priest in 1825, becoming curate to his father's friend, Samuel Crowther, the incumbent of Christ Church, Newgate Street. In 1835 he was appointed rector of St Antholin Watling Street, a post which he held until 1849 when the Archbishop of Canterbury presented him to the rectory of Allhallows the Great, Thames Street. In 1856 the lord chancellor presented him to the rectory of St. Margaret Lothbury, which he held until 1860, when Lord Palmerston advanced him to the deanery of Ripon.

For some years Goode was editor of the Christian Observer. He was Warburtonian lecturer from 1853 to 1857. He died suddenly on 13 August 1868.

== Works ==
He was the author of a large number of tracts, pamphlets, letters, and speeches on the church-rate question, the Gorham case, and the Tractarian movement. His works include:

- Memoir of the Rev. W. Goode, M.A. 2nd edition, 1828.
- ‘The Modern Claims to the Possession of the extraordinary Gifts of the Spirit, stated and examined,’ &c., 2nd edition, 1834.
- ‘A Brief History of Church Rates, proving the Liability of a Parish to them to be a Common-Law Liability,’ &c., 2nd edition, 1838.
- ‘The Divine Rule of Faith and Practice,’ 2 vols. 1842, and again revised and enlarged in 3 vols. 1853. This is an expansion of William Chillingworth's doctrine that "the Bible alone is the religion of protestants", supported by a collection of church authorities, as an exposition of evangelical theology.
- ‘Tract XC. historically refuted; or a Reply to a Work by the Rev. F. Oakeley, entituled “The subject of Tract XC. historically examined,”’ 1845, 2nd edition, 1866.
- ‘The Doctrine of the Church of England as to the effects of Baptism in the case of Infants. With an Appendix containing the Baptismal Services of Luther and the Nuremberg and Cologne Liturgies,’ 1849; 2nd edition, 1850.
- ‘A Vindication of the Doctrine of the Church of England on the Validity of the Orders of the Scotch and Foreign Non-Episcopal Churches,’ in three pamphlets, &c., 1852
- ‘The Nature of Christ's Presence in the Eucharist, or the Doctrine of the Real Presence vindicated in opposition to the fictitious Real Presence asserted by Archdeacon Denison, Mr. (late Archdeacon) Wilberforce, and Dr. Pusey,’ 2 vols., 1856. A supplement to this appeared in 1858.
- ‘Fulfilled Prophecy. A Proof of the Truth of Revealed Religion, being the Warburtonian Lectures for 1854–8,’ 1863.
