= Woodrow Wilson Goode =

Woodrow Wilson Goode could refer to:

- Woodrow Wilson Goode Sr. (born 1938), former mayor of Philadelphia, Pennsylvania
- Woodrow Wilson Goode Jr. (born 1965), former member of the Philadelphia City Council and son of Woodrow Wilson Goode Sr.
