= Good Good =

Good Good may refer to:

- Good Good (YouTube channel), an American golf-oriented video channel and company
- "Good Good" (Ashanti song), 2008
- "Good Good" (Usher, Summer Walker and 21 Savage song), 2023
- "Good Good" (Florida Georgia Line song), 2014
- "Good Good", a song by Saweetie from her 2018 EP High Maintenance
