= Frank Goode =

Australian rules footballer (1939–2026)

- Goode with North Melbourne in the 1960s

Personal information
- Born: 19 December 1939
- Died: 19 October 2026 (aged 86)
- Original team: Moe/Heyfield
- Debut: Round 18, 1961, North Melbourne vs. St Kilda, at Junction Oval
- Height: 183 cm (6 ft 0 in)
- Weight: 83 kg (183 lb)
- Position: Utility / Full Forward

Playing career^{1}
| Years | Club | Games (Goals) |
| 1961–1967 | North Melbourne | 73 (107) |

Coaching career
| Years | Club | Games (W–L–D) |
| 1981 | Footscray | 1 (0–1–0) |
- ^{1} Playing statistics correct to the end of 1967.

Frank Goode (19 December 1939 – 19 October 2026) was an Australian rules footballer who played for the North Melbourne Football Club in the Victorian Football League (VFL) during the 1960s.

Owing to an injury to John Dugdale, Goode spent the 1965 and 1966 VFL seasons as a full-forward with success. He topped North Melbourne's goal kicking in those years with 38 and 49 goals respectively. Injured in early 1967, Goode had surgery before being injured again in 1968 and when the second surgery failed he went on to coach North's u19's after which he coached Sandringham in the Victorian Football Association (VFA) in 1971 and 1972.

Goode later became assistant coach at Footscray and in 1981 stepped in for senior coach Royce Hart in a game against Melbourne, which they lost. Goode later joined the AFL Tribunal for 5 years.

Goode died on 19 October 2026, aged 86.
