= Frederick John Gooder =

New Zealand cricketer

Frederick John Gooder was a New Zealand cricketer active from 1884 to 1885 who played for Wellington cricket team Frederick appeared in one first-class match. Frederick was born in Wellington, New Zealand on 17 January 1862 and died in Wellington, New Zealand on 13 April 1948. He scored 10 runs, reaching 5 runs in each of his two innings.
