= City of Payneham =

Local government area in South Australia

Coordinates: 34°53′44″S 138°38′31″E

The former City of Payneham

The City of Payneham, formerly the District Council of Stepney, was a local government area in South Australia from 1867 to 1997.

== History ==
The District Council of Stepney was proclaimed on 25 July 1867, separating from the original District Council of Payneham. It was divided into five wards: Hackney, Stepney, Payneham, Marden and Stepney North. On 27 February 1868, the original Payneham council was renamed the District Council of Campbelltown, and when the western part of the Stepney council was severed to form the Corporate Town of St Peters on 30 August 1883, the remainder of the Stepney council assumed the District Council of Payneham name. The council rented offices at the Payneham Institute, and met at the Masonic Lodge Hall.

It became a municipal corporation on 1 October 1945 as the Corporate Town of Payneham, and gained city status as the City of Payneham on 28 November 1964, when the population officially exceeded 15,000. In 1964, the council opened the new Civic Centre, containing council offices, a library and two community halls. In the 1960s and 1970s, it was involved in developing a series of community facilities: Adey Reserve (1961), Patterson Reserve (1966) and clubrooms (1970), Payneham Memorial Swimming Centre (1968), Payneham and District Senior Citizens Centre (1972), Drage Reserve (1974) and the Payneham Youth Centre (1978). A new Payneham Public Library was opened in 1980, and the Payneham Community Centre opened in 1984.

In 1985, it covered an area of 7.1 square kilometres, with a population of 16,502 as of the 1981 census, down from 17,543 in 1971. It had significant communities of both elderly residents (19% of the population) and people from Italian backgrounds (approximately 14% born in Italy, with an estimated 40% of Italian descent).

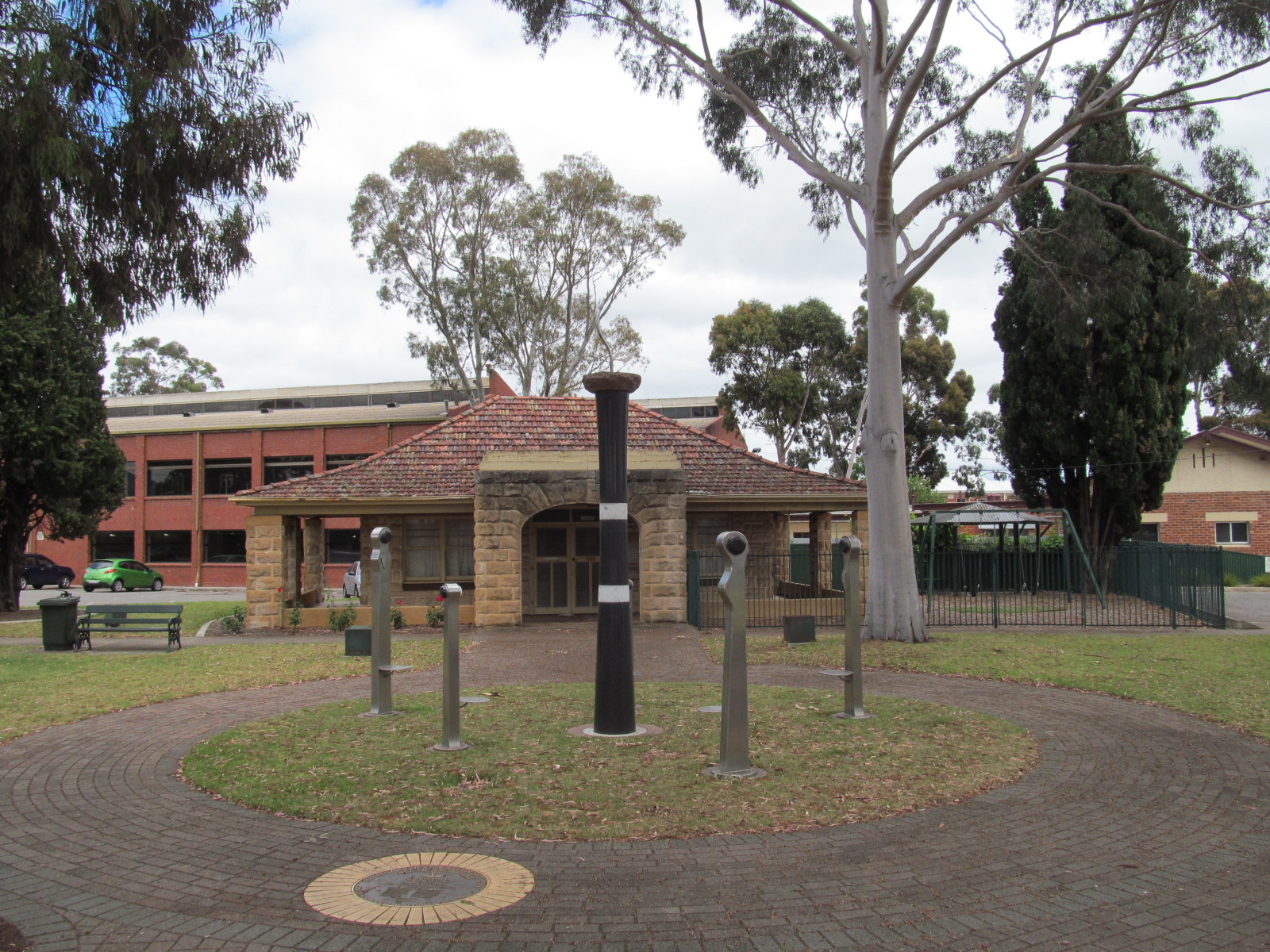
Portrush Road Reserve in Payneham, South Australia

The 1973-1975 Royal Commission into Local Government Areas had recommended that the St Peters council merge back into Payneham, but this was rejected at the time. However, pressure for the smaller inner-city municipalities to merge continued, and on 1 November 1997 it amalgamated with the City of Kensington and Norwood and the Town of St Peters to form the City of Norwood Payneham & St Peters.

== Chairmen and mayors of Payneham ==
- Richard George Albert Martin (1923-1929, 1930-1931, 1935-1944)
- Fred Norman Drage (1944-1950)
- Alfred Edgar Clifford Grivell (1950-1956)
- Clifford Julius Frick (1956-1961)
- Maxwell Ernest Redden (1961-1968)
- Archibald Hugh Maclaine Gough (1968-1971)
- Norman James Wilson (1971-1981)
- John Minney (1987-1991)
