= Royal Goode =

Swedish chess player

Personal information
- Born: 1 September 1913 United States
- Died: 3 September 1978 (aged 65) Timrå, Sweden

Chess career
- Country: Sweden

Royal Goode (1 September 1913 – 3 September 1978) was a Swedish chess player and Swedish Chess Championship silver medal winner (1954).

== Biography ==
In the 1950s, Royal Goode was one of Sweden's leading chess players. In Swedish Chess Championships he won the silver medal in 1954, having been tied for 1st place and ultimately losing an additional match against Bengt-Eric Hörberg - 1:2.

Royal Goode represented Sweden in the Chess Olympiad:

- In 1954, at second reserve board in the 11th Chess Olympiad in Amsterdam (+0, =3, -6).
