= Steven Goode =

Steven Goode may refer to:

- Steven Goode (lawyer), American lawyer
- Steven Goode, a contestant on Big Brother (British series 15)
