= Goode Brothers =

Goode Brothers may refer to the following partnerships in South Australia, of related people:

- Goode Brothers, formerly H. A. and W. Goode, a store in Port Pirie, after 1909
- Goode Brothers, a softgoods business in Adelaide from 1850 by Charles Henry Goode and family
- Goode Brothers, Sheaoak Hills, sheep farmers in Terowie until 1809, the children of Thomas Goode (pastoralist)
