= Bad River =

Bad River may refer:

== Rivers ==
- Bad River (Michigan), a tributary of the Shiawassee River in the US
- Bad River (South Dakota), a tributary of the Missouri River in the US
- Bad River (Wisconsin), flowing into Lake Superior in the US
- Bad River (British Columbia), a tributary of the Fraser River

== Other uses ==
- Bad River Band of the Lake Superior Tribe of Chippewa Indians
  - Bad River Train Blockade, a 1996 action on the Bad River reservation
