= John Goode =

John Goode may refer to:

- John Goode (Virginia politician) (1829–1909), politician in the Confederate Congress, U.S. congressman and acting Solicitor General of the United States
- John Paul Goode (1862–1932), lawyer and politician in San Antonio
- John W. Goode (1923–1994), geographer and cartographer
- J. Thomas Goode (1835–1916), American politician in the Virginia House of Delegates

== See also ==
- "Johnny B. Goode", a 1958 song by Chuck Berry
- John Good (disambiguation)
