= John the Good =

John the Good may refer to:

- Jan II the Good (1460–1532), Polish prince, Duke of Opole
- John the Good (bishop of Milan), or John Bono, bishop of Milan in the 7th century
- John II Komnenos (1087–1143), Emperor of the Byzantine Empire
- John II of France (1319–1364), King of France
- John I of Portugal (1357–1433), King of Portugal and the Algarve
- Johann II, Prince of Liechtenstein (1840–1929), Prince of Liechtenstein
