= Thomas Goode =

Thomas Goode may refer to:

- Thomas Henry Goode (1933–1994), Canadian politician
- Thomas Good (1609–1678), or Goode, English academic administrator and clergyman
- Thomas Goode (tableware), historic English seller of tableware and cutlery
- Thomas Goode (merchant) (1816–1882), South Australian merchant
- Thomas Goode (pastoralist) (1835–1926), pastoralist in the Colony of South Australia
- Thomas Goode (physician) (1787–1858), established European style spa treatment in Virginia
- J. Thomas Goode, member of the Virginia House of Delegates
- Tom Goode (American football) (1938–2015), American football player
- Tom Goode (politician) (1902–1983), Canadian politician

== See also ==
- Thomas Good (disambiguation)
