= William Goode, the elder =

British priest (1762–1816)

William Goode, the elder (1762–1816) was an English evangelical Anglican clergyman.

== Life ==
Born 2 April 1762 at Buckingham, he was the son of William Goode (d. 1780) of the town. At ten years of age he was placed at a private school in Buckingham, and in January 1776 at the Thomas Palmer Bull's dissenting academy at Newport Pagnell, Buckinghamshire, where he remained until Christmas 1777. In the summer of 1778, after working his father's business, he went as a private pupil to the Rev. Thomas Clarke at Chesham Bois, Buckinghamshire. He matriculated at Magdalen Hall, Oxford, on 2 May 1780, commenced residence on the following 1 July, graduating B.A. 20 Feb. 1784, M.A. 10 July 1787.

On 19 December 1784 Goode was ordained deacon by Thomas Thurlow, bishop of Lincoln. He took the curacy of Abbots Langley in Hertfordshire, to which he added next year the curacy of King's Langley. At the end of March 1786 he became curate to William Romaine, then rector of the united parishes of St. Andrew by the Wardrobe and St. Anne, Blackfriars. On 11 June of the same year he was ordained priest by Bishop Thurlow. In February 1789 he obtained the Sunday afternoon lectureship at Blackfriars, and in December 1793 the Lady Camden Tuesday evening lectureship at St. Lawrence Jewry; Blackfriars he delivered between November 1793 and September 1795 a course of sermons on the Epistle to the Ephesians.

On 2 July 1795 Goode was chosen secretary to the Society for the Relief of poor pious Clergymen of the Established Church residing in the Country. He had supported the society from its institution in 1788, and held the office till his death. He declined a salary, voted by the committee in 1803, preferring to accept an occasional present of money. In August 1795 he succeeded, on the death of William Romaine, to the rectory of St. Andrew by the Wardrobe and St. Anne, Blackfriars; and in December 1796 he resigned the Sunday afternoon lectureship at Blackfriars on his appointment to a similar lectureship at St. John's, Wapping, which he retained until his death. In April 1799 he was present at the meeting that founded the Church Missionary Society. He was elected to the triennial Sunday evening lectureship at Christ Church, Spitalfields, in 1807, and in July 1810 to the Wednesday morning lectureship at Blackfriars. The result was that he preached at least five sermons every week.

Goode was elected president of Sion College in the spring of 1813 and delivered the customary "Concio ad Clerum". In the autumn of 1814 he visited some of the major towns in the north-western counties, and in 1815 Norwich and Ipswich, as the advocate of the Church Missionary Society. He died after a lingering illness at Stockwell, Surrey, on 15 April 1816, and was buried in the rector's vault in St. Anne's, Blackfriars, near the remains of William Romaine, as he had requested.

== Works ==
The second edition of John Brown's Self-interpreting Bible, published in 1791, was superintended by Goode. Not long after he undertook for a while the revision of Robert Bowyer's edition of David Hume's History of England, issued in 1806, but found his eyesight was inadequate.

In 1811 Goode published in two volumes An Entire New Version of the Book of Psalms, which reached a second edition in 1813 and a third in 1816. In June 1815 he completed a series of 156 essays on the Bible names of Christ, on which he had been engaged for 13 years, delivering them as lectures on Tuesday mornings at Blackfriars. Of these, 11 appeared in the Christian Guardian between July 1813 and May 1816 and in September 1820. They were published as Essays on all the Scriptural Names and Titles of Christ, or the Economy of the Gospel Dispensation as exhibited in the Person, Character, and Offices of the Redeemer … To which is prefixed a memoir of the Author [by his son William], 6 vols. London, 1822. The Memoir was issued separately in 1828, with an appendix of letters. Goode also published sermons.

== Family ==
By his marriage on 7 November 1786 to Rebecca, daughter of Abraham Coles, a silk manufacturer of London and St. Albans, Hertfordshire, Goode had, with twelve other children, two sons, Francis and William Goode, the younger.

== Notes ==
Attribution

This article incorporates text from a publication now in the public domain: Stephen, Leslie; Lee, Sidney, eds. (1890). "Goode, William (1762-1816)". Dictionary of National Biography. Vol. 22. London: Smith, Elder & Co.
