= Lefors Independent School District =

School district in Texas

Address
- 209 E 5th St Lefors, Texas, 79054-0390; United States
- Coordinates: 35.4392°N 100.8047°W

District information
- Type: Public
- Grades: PK–12
- Established: 1924; 102 years ago
- NCES District ID: 4827090

Students and staff
- Enrollment: 188
- Staff: 21.79 (on an FTE basis)
- Student–teacher ratio: 8.63
- District mascot: Pirates
- Colors: Orange & Black

Other information
- Website: leforsisd.net

Lefors Independent School District is a public school district based in Lefors, Texas, United States.

The district has one school that serves students in grades pre-kindergarten through twelve.

== Academic achievement ==
In 2009, the school district was rated "academically acceptable" by the Texas Education Agency.

== Athletics ==
Lefors High School plays six-man football.

== Notable alumni ==
- Warren Chisum, former member of the Texas House of Representatives from Pampa, graduated from Lefors High School in 1957.

== See also ==
- List of school districts in Texas
