= Harry King Goode =

British World War I flying ace

- Born: Harry King; 22 October 1892; Handsworth, England
- Died: 21 August 1942 (aged 49); Carnlough, Northern Ireland
- Burial place: Tamlaght Finlagan Churchyard, Ballykelly, County Londonderry; 55°02′44.4″N 7°00′42.1″W
- Spouse: Ena Marshall Goode (née Scales)
- Military career
- Allegiance: United Kingdom
- Branch: British Army; Royal Air Force
- Service years: 1914–1941
- Rank: Group Captain
- Units: Royal Engineers; No. 66 Squadron RAF; No. 45 Squadron RAF; No. 502 Squadron RAF
- Commands: No. 66 Squadron RAF; No. 24 Squadron RAF; No. 60 OTU
- Conflicts: World War I World War II
- Awards: Distinguished Service Order; Distinguished Flying Cross; Air Force Cross

Group Captain Harry King Goode, DSO, DFC, AFC (22 October 1892 – 21 August 1942) was an officer of the Royal Air Force (RAF). During World War I, he was a flying ace credited with 15 aerial victories. He remained in RAF service until retiring in 1941.

== Biography ==
=== Early life and education ===
He was born Harry King, in Handsworth, Staffordshire, the son of Florence Annie King, a dressmaker, but was adopted by Thomas and Margaret Goode of Ryton, Bulkington, Warwickshire. He attended a local school, and in 1907 was offered a scholarship from the local education authority, on condition he serve as a student teacher for not less than a year on completion of his studies. He entered King Edward VI Free Grammar School in Nuneaton on 16 September 1907, and in 1912 was awarded a Cambridge local honours degree. However, having spent time as a student teacher in Nuneaton and Rugby, he decided against a teaching career, and instead took a job at Alfred Herbert's making machine tools.

=== World War I ===
Goode joined the army soon after the outbreak of World War I, enlisting in the Royal Engineers on 8 September 1914. He served in France for two years, from July 1915 to July 1917, mainly as a motorcycle dispatch rider, and also gained promotion to corporal. In late 1917 he transferred to the Royal Flying Corps, starting his flight training at the No. 2 School of Military Aeronautics in Oxford on 21 September as a cadet, and was appointed a probationary second lieutenant on 8 November. In late November he was posted to No. 5 Training Squadron at Castle Bromwich, and in January 1918 to No. 63 Training Squadron at RAF Joyce Green, near Dartford, Kent, for advanced flying training. Goode was confirmed in his rank of second lieutenant on 8 April, just over a week after the Army's Royal Flying Corps (RFC) and the Royal Naval Air Service (RNAS) had been merged to form the Royal Air Force. In early May he was sent to the No. 2 School of Aerial Fighting and Gunnery in Marske, Yorkshire, to complete his training.

On 27 May Goode was posted to "C" Flight, No. 66 Squadron, flying the Sopwith Camel on the Italian Front, flying his first combat patrol on the 30th. On 25 June he claimed his first victory; an Albatros C shot down south of Asiago, then on 18 July an Albatros D.III during a melée over Cesuna. On 1 August he shot down a Roland C, which crashed near Guistina, and 5 August claimed his first kite balloon, which went down in flames south-east of Oderzo. On 9 August he shot down a Brandenberg C north of Motta, and on the 11th claimed an Albatros D.III over Valpegara. On 22 August he shot down another D.III in flames over Conegliano.

After a month's leave in England Goode returned to active duty in late September and shot down an LVG C north-east of Conegliano on the 29th. On 8 October he shot down a Roland C south west of Vado, his last victory against an enemy aircraft, as all his remaining victories were against balloons. On 22 October Goode and Captain Harold Hindle-James attacked a balloon south-west of Vazzolo, which burst into flames. Goode was awarded the Distinguished Flying Cross following this action, which was gazetted on 3 December.

Goode destroyed another balloon on 27 October, and two on the 28th, being appointed an acting-captain the same day. On 29 October he took part in an early morning bombing raid against an artillery position, then strafed the aerodrome at Stradatta, destroying another balloon on the ground, and making further attacks on ground troops. At 10:00 he took part in an attack on a train near Pianzano. On his third patrol of the day Goode first took part in an attack on enemy troops moving east on the Vittorio–Cordignano road, and then on the aerodrome at San Giacomo, strafing parked aircraft and the hangars, before harassing horse transports and other targets. Goode returned to San Giacomo later in the day to make further low level attacks. For his actions on this day he was awarded the Distinguished Service Order on 5 November 1918, which was gazetted on 8 February 1919. On 30 October Goode's flight overflew San Giacomo aerodrome, which had been destroyed by the enemy and evacuated. Later in the day they bombed a group of horse transports and light guns on the Fontanafredda–Sacile road before landing at San Giacomo to inspect the wreckage. Goode was slightly wounded in the face on 1 November, but pressed on with his attack regardless. Over the next few days Goode flew several patrols a day as the Austrians fell back in disarray. Finally, on 4 November, the armistice of Villa Giusti brought the war between Italy and Austria to a close.

No. 66 Squadron remained in Italy for another four months, until finally returning to England in February 1919. It was initially based at RAF Yatesbury, then at Leighterton in Gloucestershire. Goode briefly served as Officer Commanding, but on 21 April he crashed an Avro 504 at Leighterton. His observer was killed, but Goode escaped with a broken wrist. This would be Goode's last flight with No. 66 Squadron, with which he had made 177 flights, 134 of them operational, for a total of almost 325 flying hours. He was credited with eight enemy aircraft and seven balloons (more than any other RAF pilot on the Italian front), for a total of fifteen aerial victories. No. 66 Squadron was finally disbanded on 25 October.

=== Inter war career ===
Goode remained in service with the RAF following the end of the war, and was granted a permanent commission as a lieutenant on 1 August 1919. He was posted to the Aircraft Depot, India, on 29 July 1923, returning to the Home Establishment on 15 February 1924. He was posted to the No. 1 School of Technical Training RAF, based at RAF Halton, on 7 May 1924, transferring to No. 2 Flying Training School at RAF Digby on 8 September. On 16 January 1925 Goode was again sent overseas, to serve at No. 4 Flying Training School in Egypt, then served in the Aden Flight from 19 November. He was promoted to flight lieutenant on 1 July 1926.

Goode was serving in No. 45 Squadron RAF in Egypt in 1927 when he met Ena Marshall Scales, a teacher from Bosham, Hampshire, who was on a sight-seeing trip to the pyramids. They were married at Bosham on 2 February 1930. Their only child was born in November 1930, but died after two weeks.

On 29 December 1929 Goode was posted to the Station Headquarters at RAF North Weald, Essex, and on 9 July 1931 to No. 502 (Ulster) Squadron based at RAF Aldergrove in Northern Ireland. No. 502 was a "cadre squadron" which was composed of two flights; one of regular officers, the other of part-time civilian "special reserve" personnel . The squadron operated as a night bombing unit and each flight was equipped with four Vickers Virginia heavy bombers and one Avro Tutor for flying training. Goode was posted to Station Headquarters, RAF Hendon on 21 November 1934. He was promoted to squadron leader on 1 December 1935, taking command of No. 24 (Communications) Squadron, which provided VIP air transport. Goode was promoted to wing commander on 1 November 1938, and was awarded the Air Force Cross on 2 January 1939. In April 1939 he flew General Viscount Gort, the Chief of the Imperial General Staff on an inspection tour of the Maginot Line.

=== World War II ===
On 1 March 1941 Goode was promoted to group captain, and commanded No. 60 Operational Training Unit from late April. Having twice extended his period of service Goode finally resigned his commission on 15 December 1941, and joined the Air Ministry's Accidents Investigation Branch.

=== Death ===
Goode was killed on 21 August 1942, while flying as a passenger aboard an RAF Consolidated Liberator Mk. III. The No. 120 Squadron aircraft had taken off from RAF Nutts Corner, Northern Ireland, on a test flight in heavy mist and subsequently crashed into a hill, Big Trosk Mountain, near Carnlough with the loss of all aboard. He is buried at Tamlaght Finlagan churchyard, Ballykelly, County Londonderry.

== Honours and awards ==
Distinguished Service Order
2nd Lieutenant (Acting Captain) Harry King Goode, DFC. (Italy)

During the recent operations this officer has displayed magnificent courage and determination in attacking enemy aerodromes, kite balloons and retreating columns, inflicting very heavy loss. On 29 October he led two other machines in a bombing raid against an enemy aerodrome; he completely destroyed with a bomb, one hostile machine on the ground; and, attacking the hangars and workshops with machine-gun fire, he caused many casualties amongst the mechanics. Later on in the same day he returned alone to attack the same aerodrome, and found the enemy about to evacuate it. Flying at a very low altitude—at times his wheels almost touched the ground—he destroyed one machine with a bomb and set fire to another with machine-gun fire. The enemy personnel were driven back into the village by the vigour of his attack. Captain Goode's utter disregard of personal danger inspired all who served with him.

Distinguished Flying Cross
2nd Lieutenant (Acting Captain) Harry King Goode. (Italy)
A brilliant fighting pilot who sets a fine example of courage and determination to the officers of his squadron. He has destroyed six enemy aeroplanes and two kite balloons.
