= The Goods (band) =

American rock Band

The Goods were an American rock band formed in Miami, Florida, in 1989.

== History ==
The Goods comprised Jim Camacho (lead vocals/bass/guitar), John Camacho (lead vocals/piano), Tony Oms (guitar/bass/vocals), Kasmir Kujawa (drums/vocals). Camacho, along with his brother John, founded the group on 13 January 1989. In 1998, Tom Dowd produced their major label release, Good Things Are Coming.

Throughout the 1990s, the band released five albums including the rock opera 5 Steps to Getting Signed, in 1992, which won the prestigious "Album of the Year" honors at the Florida Jammy Awards. The single "I’m Not Average", from their critically acclaimed 1995 album Mint, reached number one on the Radio & Record charts in Florida and eventually led to a signing with Blackheart Records, a division of Polygram Records.

In 1989, the band made headlines in the Miami Herald and on the TV news program Inside Story when they began tossing condoms into audiences from stage in a public display of joining the fight against AIDS.

A one-hour biographical documentary directed by Miguel Delgato aired on VH1 on October 8, 1998.

In 1999, The Goods appeared on The Jenny Jones Show in episode 8122, "I'm Too Sexy to Get a Date."

The Goods disbanded in 1999.

Marilyn Manson, who got his first break as The Goods' opening act, commented: "I think that they are extremely talented and great musicians."

== Discography ==
- Play Rip Music (1989)
- Too True to be Good (1991)
- 5 Steps to Getting Signed (1992)
- Mint (1995)
- Good Things Are Coming (1998)
