= David Goode (sculptor) =

British sculptor

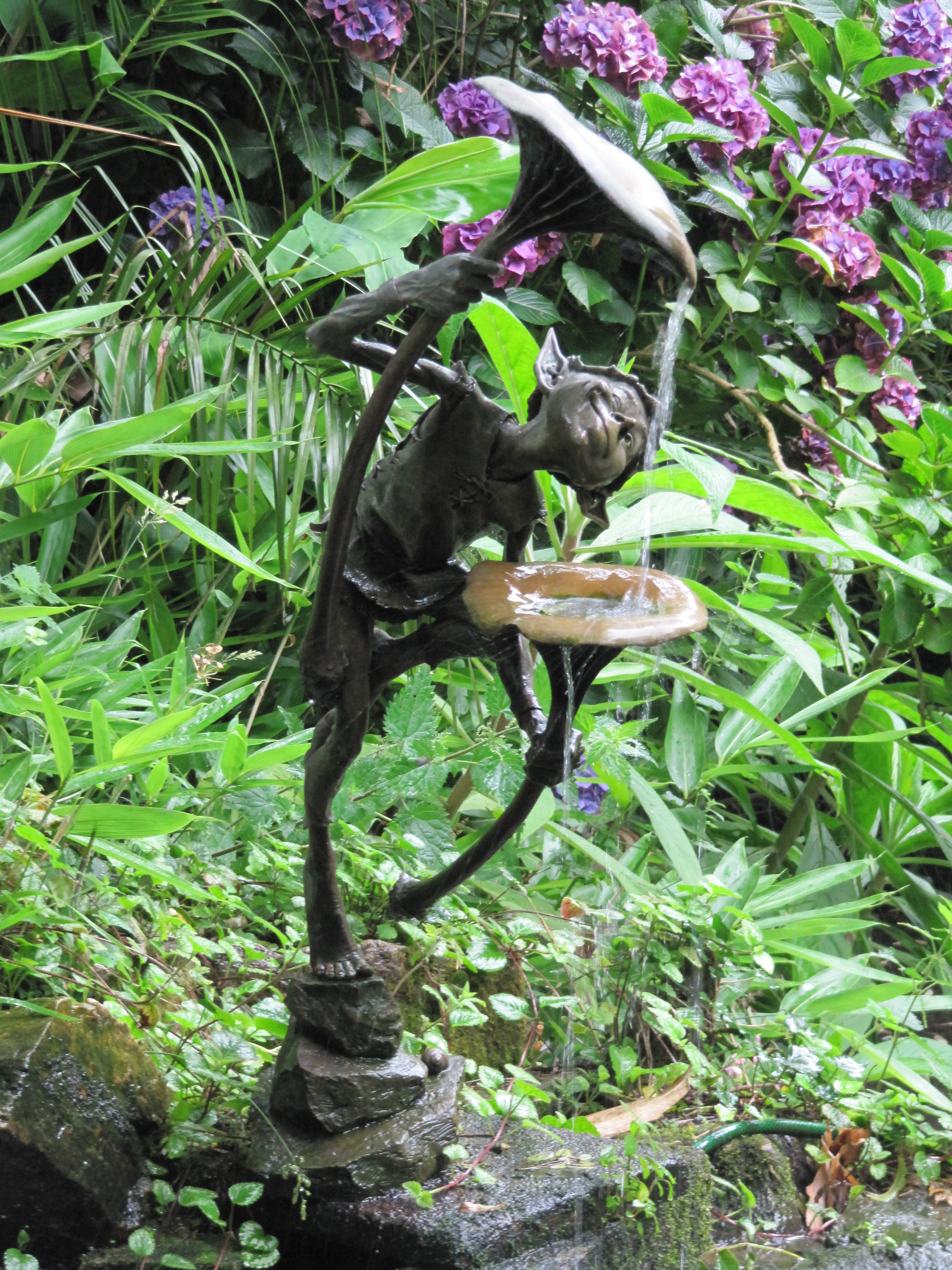
"Goblin with mushrooms" by David Goode (at Sausmarez Manor sculpture trail, 2011)

David Goode (born October 1966, in Oxford) is a British sculptor.

He attended the Sir Henry Doulton School of Sculpture in Stoke-on-Trent and specialized in portraits and figurative work. In 1988, at the age of 21, he started work as a portrait sculptor at Madame Tussauds in London, making him the youngest ever waxwork modeller to have worked for Madame Tussauds. Some of his waxworks at the museum include Freddie Mercury, Joan Collins, Madonna, Michael Jackson, George Michael, Ronald Reagan, Arnold Schwarzenegger and Yasser Arafat.

In 1994 Goode became a freelance sculptor. He took on numerous private commissions and started exhibiting his own work. In that same year Goode was accepted into the Royal Society of British Sculptors as well as the Society of Portrait Sculptors.

Parts of his goblin collection were introduced at the Chelsea Flower Show of 1995. Since 2004 several of Goode's sculptures have been shown in the sculpture trail at Sausmarez Manor, Guernsey.

David Goode now lives and works in Oxford.
