= Hugh Good (footballer) =

Scottish footballer

Personal information
- Full name: Hugh Jardine Good
- Date of birth: 2 July 1901
- Place of birth: Motherwell, Scotland
- Date of death: 1958 (aged 56–57)
- Position: Centre half

Senior career*
Years	Team	Apps	(Gls)
1920–1921	Wishaw YMCA		
1921–1922	Kilmarnock		
1922–1923	Wishaw YMCA		
1924–1926	Middlesbrough	10	(0)
1926–1927	Exeter City	4	(0)
1927–1928	Bristol City	0	(0)
1928	Torquay United	16	(0)
1928–1929	Raith Rovers		
1928	→ Bo'ness (loan)		
1929–1930	Lovells Athletic		
1930–1931	Glentoran		
1931–1932	Larne		
1933	Montrose		
Total		30	(0)
- * Club domestic league appearances and goals

Hugh Jardine Good (2 July 1901 – 1958) was a Scottish footballer who played in the Football League for Exeter City, Middlesbrough and Torquay United.
