= Lefors, Texas =

- Town
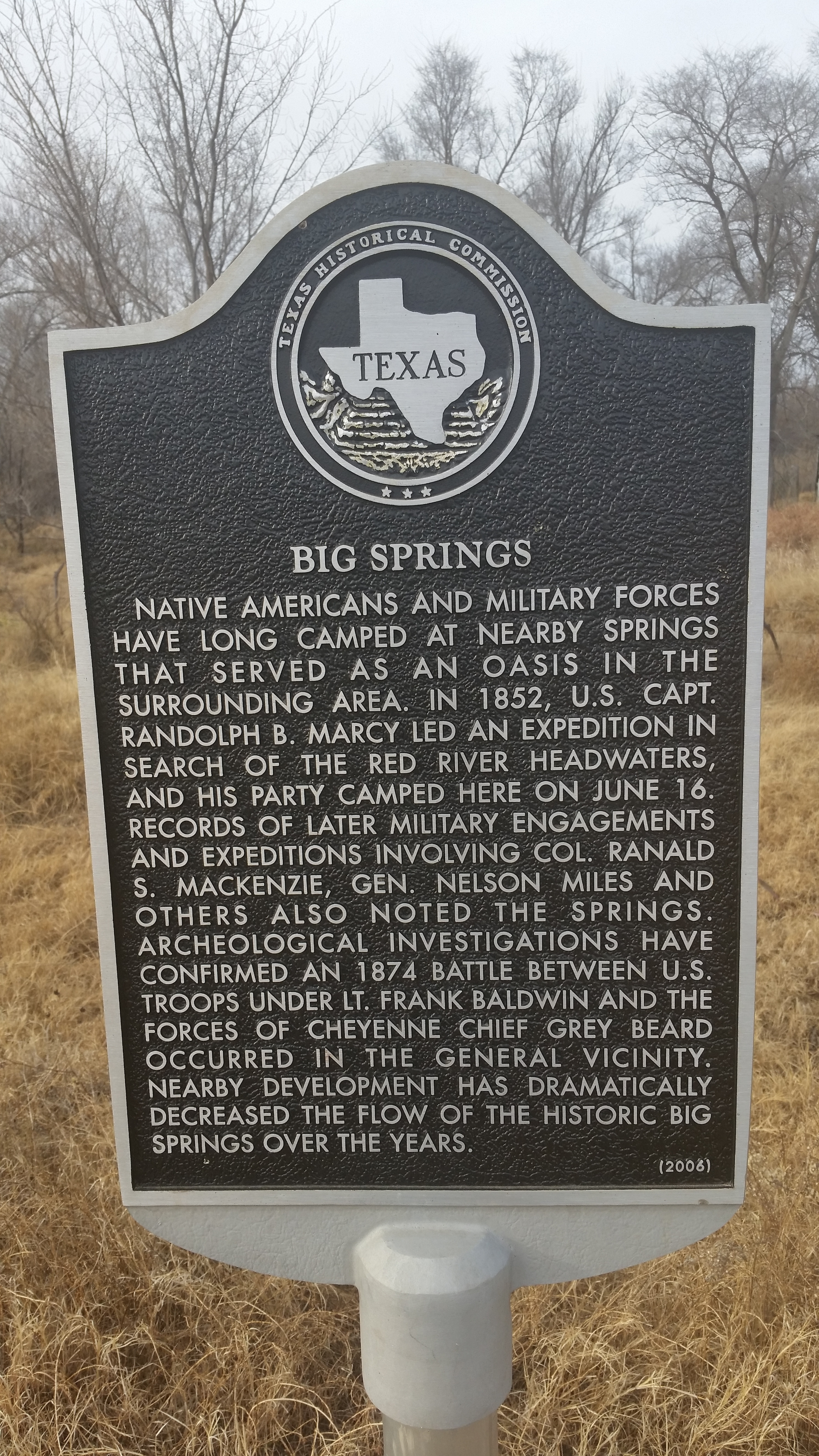
- Texas Historical Marker

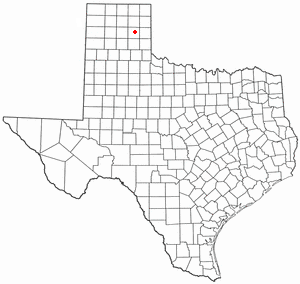
- Location of Lefors, Texas

- Coordinates: 35°26′23″N 100°48′14″W
- Country: United States
- State: Texas
- County: Gray

Government
  - Mayor: Michael Ray
  - Founded By: Travis Leach, Perry LeFors, and Henry Thut, and Henry B. Lovett

Area
  - Total: 0.39 sq mi (1.01 km^{2})
  - Land: 0.39 sq mi (1.01 km^{2})
  - Water: 0 sq mi (0.00 km^{2})
- Elevation: 2,828 ft (862 m)

Population (2020)
  - Total: 420
  - Density: 1,100/sq mi (420/km^{2})
- Time zone: UTC-6 (Central (CST))
  - Summer (DST): UTC-5 (CDT)
- ZIP code: 79054
- Area code: 806
- FIPS code: 48-42148
- GNIS feature ID: 2412888
- Website: cityoflefors.com

Lefors (/ləˈfɔːrz/ lə-FORZ) is a town in Gray County, Texas, United States. It is part of the Pampa, Texas micropolitan statistical area. Its population was 420 at the 2020 census.

== History ==
The area around modern Lefors was near the heart of Comancheria and a common village site for the nomadic tribes of Comanche.

Randolph Marcy's 1852 expedition passed this way. The Battle of the North Fork of the Red River, between the U.S. Army under the command of Ranald Slidell Mackenzie and the Comanche, was fought near here on September 29, 1872. Cheyenne chief Grey Beard's band was attacked near here in 1874 by the U.S. Army.

Lefors was founded in 1888 by Travis Leach, Perry LeFors, Henry Thut, and Henry B. Lovett. The town was named for Perry LeFors, who traveled with his father to the Panhandle in 1878 and later became foreman of the Diamond F Ranch, a part of the Francklyn Land and Cattle Company, which became insolvent in 1886 and became the White Deer Lands Trust Company, of which Timothy Dwight Hobart was the agent.

In 1882, the first homestead on the future townsite was laid by Travis Leach, a rancher and surveyor, whose log cabin served as a stagecoach stop on the mail route from Fort Elliott and Mobeetie to Tascosa. Henry B. Lovett, a former buffalo hunter, and Henry Thut, a Swiss immigrant whose sister-in-law, Emma Lang, married LeFors, also settled in the vicinity during the 1880s. George Henry Saunders had a ranch camp headquarters nearby.

Other settlers soon moved into the area, and in 1892, a post office was opened at Lefors with Thut as postmaster. (Postal officials required that the F be lower-cased.) Four years later, a combination school and church building was built. When Gray County was organized on May 27, 1902, Lefors was named the county seat. A two-story frame courthouse was built for less than $2,500, and Thut, who became the first county treasurer, erected a hotel. Perry LeFors served as the town's first constable. The population reached 150 in 1910, and despite its small size and the lack of a railroad, the town managed for a time to remain the county seat.

When the oil boom hit the county during the 1920s, three oil pools were discovered in the vicinity. Lefors profited from the boom, especially in real estate; the boom resulted in the establishment of an independent school district and the bringing of electricity and other modern utilities to the town.

By 1931, Lefors had incorporated, and in 1932, the town finally obtained a railroad, when the Fort Worth and Denver extended its line from Pampa. The population increased to 809 by 1940. Several Protestant denominations established churches in the community.

Eight people died when an early spring snowstorm stranded about 100 people in around 55 automobiles on the road between Pampa and Lefors on April 7–8, 1938. After between 10 and 12 inches of snow fell in the Panhandle, with 50-mile-an-hour winds creating drifts 5-25 tall, men with farm tractors and heavy oilfield equipment had to come to the rescue of the snowed-in travelers, which included two school buses rescued by the army.

The town suffered a flood in 1961, unemployment from the closure of several area carbon black plants in 1964, and a tornado in 1975.

== Geography ==
According to the United States Census Bureau, the town has a total area of 0.4 square miles (1.0 km^{2}), all land.

Lefors is on the North Fork of the Red River and State Highway 273, 12 miles southeast of Pampa in central Gray County.

== Demographics ==
Historical population
Census	Pop.	Note	%±
1930	952		—
1940	809		−15.0%
1950	577		−28.7%
1960	864		49.7%
1970	816		−5.6%
1980	829		1.6%
1990	656		−20.9%
2000	559		−14.8%
2010	497		−11.1%
2020	420		−15.5%
U.S. Decennial Census; 2020 Census

As of the census of 2020, 420 people were residing in Lefors, which had 231 housing units. The racial makeup of the town was 95.17% White, 0.4% African American, 1.6% from other races, and 1.81% from two or more races. Hispanics or Latinos of any race were 4.03% of the population.

Of the 231 households, 32.5% had children under the age of 18 living with them, 58.0% were married couples living together, 6.9% had a female householder with no husband present, and 33.3% were not families. About 31.2% of all households were made up of individuals, and 19.0% had someone living alone who was 65 years of age or older. The average household size was 2.42, and the average family size was 3.05.

In the town, the age distribution was27.2% under 18, 7.2% from 18 to 24, 24.2% from 25 to 44, 22.4% from 45 to 64, and 19.1% who were 65 or older. The median age was 38 years. For every 100 females, there were 88.2 males. For every 100 females age 18 and over, there were 85.8 males.

The median income for a household in the town was $47,833, and for a family was $38,594. Males had a median income of $28,611 versus $21,071 for females. The per capita income for the town was $13,165. About 8.3% of families and 9.9% of the population were below the poverty line, including 7.7% of those under age 18 and 5.6% of those age 65 or over.

== Education ==
The Town of Lefors is served by the Lefors Independent School District. The school serves all children prekindergarten through grade 12. A school bond was passed to renovate the auditorium and old gymnasium. Two previous bonds were passed to renovate the secondary building and the track. The Lefors Pirates and the Lefors Bandits, the middle school team, play six-man football on the newly refurbished grounds during the fall. Lefors ISD offers football, tennis, golf, basketball, cross country, and track and field through its athletic department, as well as academic UIL.

The school is in the process of bringing more technology to the students, and has recently reached a one-to-one ratio of students to laptops in the secondary building. The elementary-school children also have access to tablets.

Lefors ISD typically enrolls about 170 students per school year, with many of them transfer students from Pampa.

== Climate ==
According to the Köppen climate classification, Lefors has a semiarid climate, BSk on climate maps.
