= List of people known as the Good =

The epithet "the Good" may refer to:

- Alexander I of Moldavia (died 1432), Voivode (Prince) of Moldavia
- Charles the Good (1083–1127), Count of Flanders and Danish Roman Catholic saint best known for being murdered while praying in a church
- Fulk II, Count of Anjou (died 958), known as "le Bon" ("the Good")
- Haakon the Good (c. 920–961), King of Norway
- Henry VI the Good (1294–1335), Duke of Wrocław
- Hywel Dda (c. 880–948), king of most of Wales
- Jan II the Good (c. 1460–1532), Duke of Opole-Brzeg and ruler of various other regions
- John I of Portugal (1358–1433), King of Portugal and the Algarve
- John II of France (1319–1364), King of France
- María Díaz I de Haro (1270–1342), Spanish noblewoman
- Emperor Meiji (1852-1912), Emperor of Japan
- Philip the Good (1396–1467), Duke of Burgundy
- Sigeberht the Good (died before 664), King of the East Saxons
- Wenceslaus I, Duke of Bohemia (911–935 or possibly 929), also known as Václav the Good, subject of the Christmas carol "Good King Wenceslas"

== See also ==
- List of people known as the Great
- List of people known as the Bad
- List of people known as the Cruel
