= Misbehave =

Misbehave may refer to:

- "Misbehave", a song on the 1992 Chumbawamba single (Someone's Always Telling You How To) Behave
- "Misbehave", a 2017 single by Atle Pettersen
- "Misbehave", a song on the 2020 Monsta X album All About Luv
- "Misbehave", a 2022 single by Lewis OfMan featuring Coco & Clair Clair

== See also ==
- Human behavior
  - Acting out
  - Anti-social behavior
  - Deviance (sociology)
  - Misconduct
- MISBHV (pronounced "misbehave"), a Polish streetwear brand
- Misbehaving (disambiguation)
- Misbehaviour (disambiguation)
