= Behaving Badly =

Behaving Badly can refer to:

- Behaving Badly (film), 2014 film
- Behaving Badly (horse), a thoroughbred racehorse
- Behaving Badly (TV serial), 1989 television series
- "Behaving Badly", a song by Animals as Leaders from their self-titled debut album, 2009

== See also ==
- Bad Behaviour (disambiguation)
- Behave (disambiguation)
- Bad (disambiguation)
- misbehaviour
