= Animal behaviour (disambiguation) =

Animal behavior is the area of science also known as ethology.

'Animal behavior may also refer to:

- Animal Behavior (film), a 1989 comedy
- Animal Behaviour (journal), a scientific journal
- "Animal Behavior", a 1992 song from the album Transmutation (Mutatis Mutandis) by Praxis
- Animal Behaviour (film), an Oscar-nominated animated short film by Alison Snowden and David Fine

== See also ==
- Animal mobbing behaviour, an antipredator adaptation in prey species
- Animal sexual behaviour, mating or reproductively motivated activities
- Behavior (disambiguation)
