= Teacher Plus (magazine) =

Indian magazine for schoolteachers

- Editor: Dr. Usha Raman
- Categories: Indian magazines
- Frequency: Monthly
- Founded: 1989
- Country: India
- Language: English
- Website: http://www.teacherplus.org

Teacher Plus is an Indian magazine for schoolteachers.

Teacher Plus is published monthly with a distributed team of writers, editors and photographers across India. It has a readership of approximately 25,000. Teacher Plus includes a pullout sheet of activities or a poster in every issue. The articles include both academic and practical perspectives on topics such as classroom management, teaching methods, and extra-curricular activities. The magazine also reviews educational websites.

== History ==
Teacher Plus first started as a bi-monthly in Hyderabad in 1989,1989 by Orient Longman. The magazine then adopted a tabloid format in 2002. Later in 2007, Spark-India bought Teacher Plus and converted it into a monthly magazine with a new design and cover. Finally, in 2010 Dr. Usha Raman, who is a communications professional, became the editor of Teacher Plus after taking it over from Spark-India. Wipro Applying Thought in Schools (WATIS) began funding Teacher Plus in development, production and distribution costs since 2006.
