= Good behaviour =

Good behaviour (or ... behavior, or compounds incorporating them) may refer to:

- Good behavior or good conduct time, penal system and legal terminology
- Good Behavior Game, educational psychology research and practice
- Good practice towards people such as good doing

Good behaviour may also refer to:

== Literature ==
- Good Behaviour (Keane novel), a 1981 by Molly Keane
- Good Behavior, a 1985 novel in John Dortmunder series by Donald E. Westlake
- Good Behavior, a 2016 compilation in The Letty Dobesh Chronicles series by Blake Crouch

== Television ==
- Goode Behavior, a 1990s sitcom which aired on UPN
- Good Behavior, a 2008 ABC TV pilot based on the New Zealand series Outrageous Fortune
- Good Behavior (TV series), a 2016 drama airing on TNT

== See also ==
- Behavior (disambiguation)
- Good (disambiguation)
- Pathological (mathematics)
- Bad Behaviour (disambiguation)
