= Naomi Zigmond =

American education scholar

Naomi Zigmond is an American education scholar, currently a Distinguished Professor at the University of Pittsburgh. Her research involves child education and classroom education.
