= Bad Behaviour =

Bad Behaviour may refer to:

- Bad behaviour (mathematics), a pathological phenomenon; properties atypically bad or counterintuitive
- Bad Behavior, a 1988 short story collection by American writer Mary Gaitskill
- Bad Behaviour (1993 film), 1993 British comedy film
- Bad Behaviour (2010 film)
- Bad Behaviour (2023 film), 2023 New Zealand dark comedy film
- Bad Behaviour (2015 book), 2015 memoir by Rebecca Starford
- Bad Behaviour (TV series), 2023 Australian television drama series inspired by Starford's memoir
- "Bad Behaviour" (song), by Jedward
- Bad Behaviour Tour, by Jedward
- "Bad Behaviour", a song on the Fuzzy Logic album by Super Furry Animals

== See also ==
- Behavior (disambiguation)
- Bad (disambiguation)
- Behaving Badly (disambiguation)
- Good behaviour (disambiguation)
- Misbehaviour
