= J Balvin =

Colombian singer (born 1985)

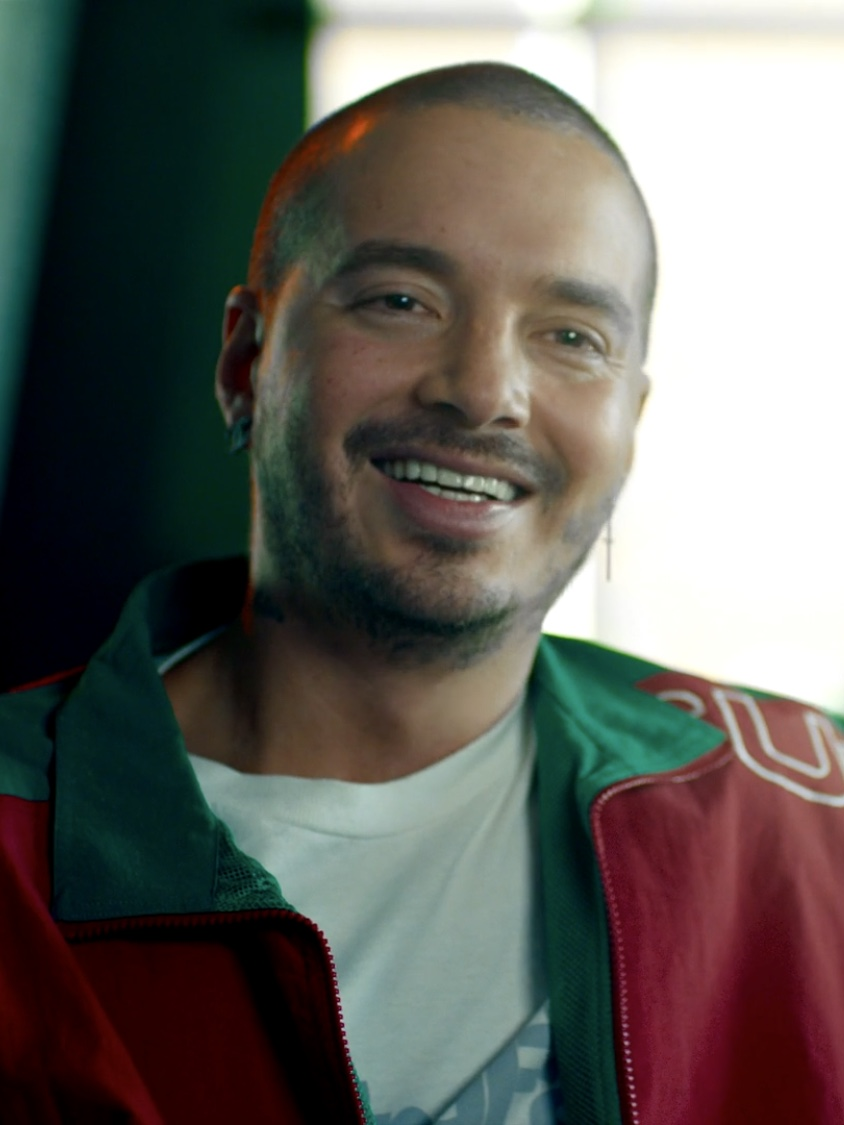
- Balvin in 2018
- Born: José Álvaro Osorio Balvin; 7 May 1985 (age 41); Medellín, Antioquia, Colombia
- Occupations: Singer; record producer
- Years active: 2004–present
- Partner: Valentina Ferrer (2018–2026)
- Children: 1
- Musical career
- Genres: Reggaeton; urbano; Latin pop
- Instrument: Vocals
- Labels: Capitol Latin; Universal Latino; Infinity; Capitol
- Website: jbalvin.com

José Álvaro Osorio Balvín (born 7 May 1985), known professionally as J Balvin, is a Colombian singer. He is one of the best-selling Latin artists, with 35 million records sold worldwide. Balvin was born in Medellín. At age 17, he moved to the United States to learn English, living in both Oklahoma and New York. He then returned to Medellín and gained popularity performing at clubs in the city.

Throughout his career, Balvin has won eleven Billboard Latin Music Awards, six Latin Grammy Awards, five MTV Video Music Awards and seven Latin American Music Awards and received four Grammy Award nominations. In 2017, the BMI Latin Awards named him the Contemporary Latin Songwriter of the Year for his contribution in the Latin music industry, and has won the first Global Icon Award given by Lo Nuestro Awards, in recognition of his contribution to spread Latin music worldwide. He became the first Latino to headline world-musical events such as Coachella, Tomorrowland, and Lollapalooza. The Guinness World Records acknowledged him as a "leader of a second-generation reggaeton revolution".

Balvin's breakthrough came in 2014 with the single "6 AM" featuring Puerto Rican singer Farruko, which peaked at number 2 on the Billboard Hot Latin Songs chart, followed by "Ay Vamos" and "Ginza". In 2016, he released Energia, which included the hit singles "Bobo", "Safari", and "Sigo Extrañándote". In June 2017, Balvin released the single "Mi Gente" with Willy William. On 1 August 2017, "Mi Gente" topped the Global Top 50 on Spotify, and later reached one billion views on YouTube. In January 2018, he released the hit single "Machika" featuring Jeon and Anitta. He collaborated with Cardi B and Bad Bunny on the US Billboard Hot 100 number-one single "I Like It", which was also nominated for the Grammy Award for Record of the Year. Balvin released his fifth studio album José in March 2021 and his sixth album Rayo in August 2024.

Though his music is primarily reggaeton, Balvin has experimented with a variety of musical genres in his work, including electronica, house, Latin trap, and R&B. His original musical inspirations included rock groups such as Metallica and Nirvana, and fellow reggaeton artist Daddy Yankee. He has collaborated with Latin American artists such as Ozuna, Nicky Jam, Bad Bunny and Pitbull. Despite working with many English-speaking artists such as Beyoncé, Pharrell Williams, Black Eyed Peas, Cardi B, Dua Lipa and Major Lazer, Balvin continues to sing almost exclusively in Spanish, and hopes to introduce Spanish-language music to a global audience. He is also noted for his eclectic and colourful fashion sense.

Balvin received the Vision Award from the Latin heritage Awards in 2016, and in 2019 he won the Golden Artist of Latin Urban Music at the Premios Heat. In 2020 he was included on Time magazine's annual list of the 100 most influential people of the world, and was called one of the Greatest Latin Artists of All Time by Billboard. Balvin is the artist with the most number one songs on the Billboard Latin Airplay chart. He is also the only Latin artist to reach number one on the Billboard charts 174 times.

== Life and career ==
=== 1985–2013: Early life and career beginnings ===
Balvin was born in Medellín on 7 May 1985 into an upper-middle-class family of Spanish and Syrian descent. His father was an economist and business owner. He grew up listening to rock groups such as Metallica and Nirvana, and states that he incorporates the grunge aesthetic into his personal style, having a Nirvana tattoo on his knee. He developed an interest in reggaeton after listening to Daddy Yankee. He recalls that "I was such a fan that I was copying his style, the way he moved onstage, his flows, his raps," comparing him to the reggaeton equivalent of Jay-Z. His father's business went bankrupt, and the family lost their home and car, requiring the family to move to a poorer neighbourhood. During this period of his life, Balvin notes, "When I would go to the barrio, people saw me as a rich person, but when I'm around rich people they see me as someone from the ghetto. It's all perceptions. I like moving between worlds. I feel equally comfortable in both."

When Balvin was 16, he participated in an English-exchange program in Oklahoma, but was disappointed by the experience, saying, "I was expecting the U.S. that everyone knows from Hollywood." Soon after the program, he moved to New York City to further study English and music, living with an aunt on Staten Island and working as a dog walker. During his time in New York, he became fascinated by the business savvy of New York rappers 50 Cent and P. Diddy. Balvin worked various jobs in New York, Miami, and Medellín, including working illegally in the United States as a roofer and house painter. He ultimately decided to return to Colombia and began performing at various urban clubs in Medellín and increasing his social media following. He enrolled at the prestigious EAFIT University in Medellín for seven semesters, studying international business. At age 19, he began to seriously pursue a career in music and adopted the stage name J Balvin "El Negocio", meaning "The Business" in English.

He met his DJ and business partner David Rivera Mazo in a freestyle battle on the street in Medellín. The two became fast friends and started producing and promoting their own music without a record label. Balvin's early songs were described as "basically poor imitations of commercial reggaeton from Puerto Rico," but he soon adopted a more relaxed, minimalist style in his music. In 2004, he released his first song titled "Panas". He signed to EMI Colombia in 2009 and soon after released the single "Ella Me Cautivó," which charted at number 35 on the Billboard Tropical Songs chart. He released his reissue of his mixtape, Real, in 2009. In 2012, Balvin released a mixtape featuring many of his early hits in Colombia, including "En Lo Oscuro" and "Como un Animal". His first international hit was the one-night-stand-themed "Yo Te Lo Dije" and signed with Universal subsidiary Capitol Latin a year later.

=== 2014–2016: "6 AM" success and La Familia ===
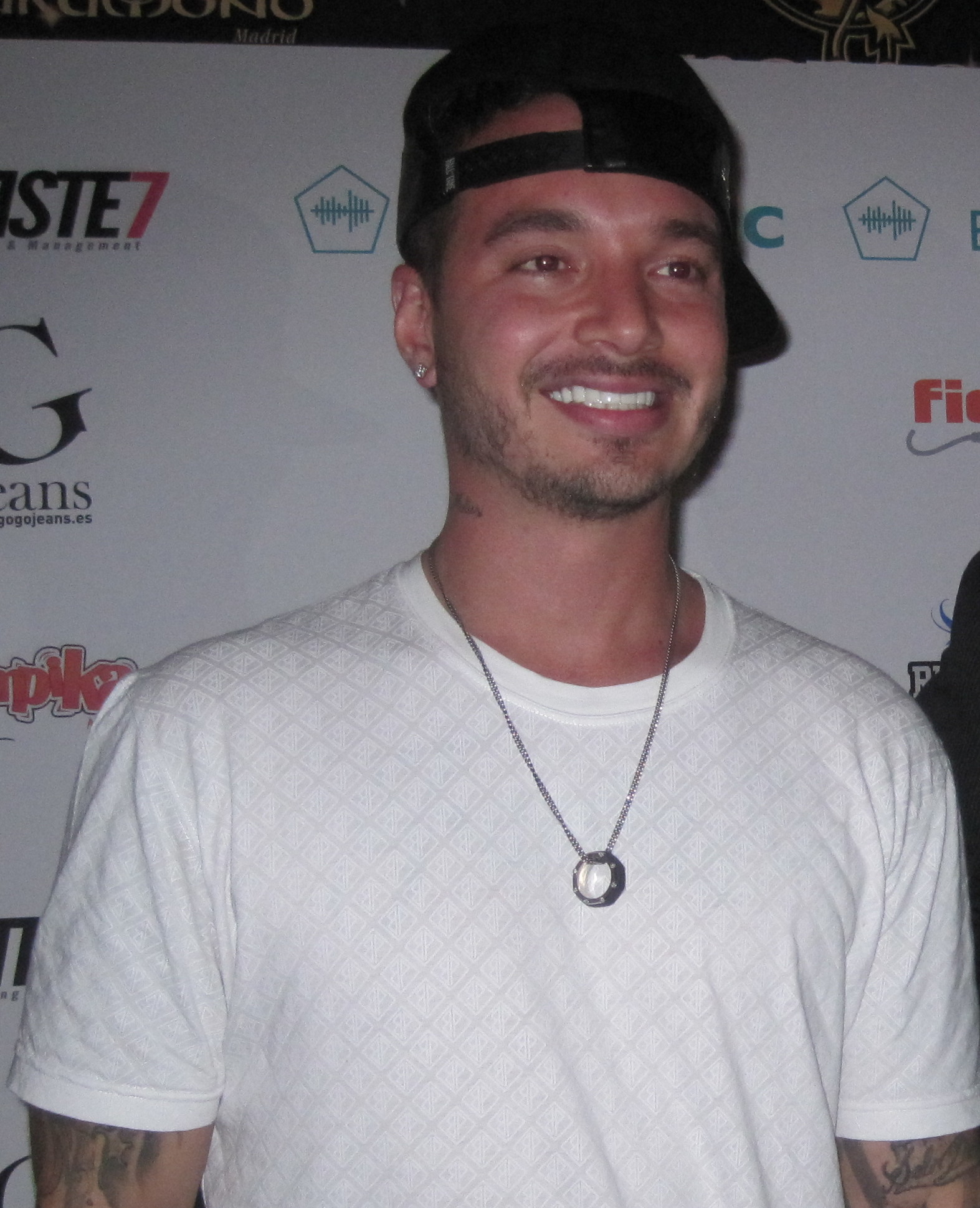
Balvin in 2014

In February 2014, Balvin released a new track entitled "6 AM," featuring Puerto Rican singer Farruko. Balvin described the lyrical content of the song as the "Latin version of The Hangover," where the two singers attempt to remember what happened during a night of partying. The song debuted at number 43 on the Billboard Latin Airplay chart in February and reached number one in May. His album La Familia reached number ten on the Billboard Top Latin Albums chart, spending 122 weeks on the chart in total.

Shortly after, Balvin released his second track in the United States, "Ay Vamos," which solidified his mark in the Latin urban market. It won a Latin Grammy Award for Best Urban Song. This was a bonus track on the deluxe edition of Balvin's album La Familia B-Sides. The music video is one of the most watched Latin music videos of all time, at over one billion views, and the song became the first 1 billion views in history by a reggaeton artist. Currently having 1.9 billion views on YouTube, the song is the most watched solo Latin urban artist video. The song went to number one on the Billboard Hot Latin Songs chart in 2015. The remix, featuring Nicky Jam and French Montana was used in the soundtrack to the film Furious 7. Balvin performed the track at the 2015 Premios Lo Nuestro and the Billboard Latin Music Awards. Balvin has been featured on remixes of "Sorry" by Justin Bieber, "The Way" and "Problem" by Ariana Grande, "Blurred Lines" by Robin Thicke, "Maps" by Maroon 5, and "Stuck on a Feeling" by Prince Royce. Balvin was the first Colombian singer to record with "The Prince of Bachata" and establishing itself as an international artist.

Balvin swept the urban category at the 2015 Premios Lo Nuestro, including Urban Artist of the Year, Urban Album of the Year, Urban Song of the Year, and Urban Collaboration of the Year. On 12 February, the nominees for the Billboard Latin Music Awards were announced, and Balvin was nominated 13 times, of these nominations, eight were in the same category twice "Ay Vamos" and "6 AM," being the most nominated Colombian and the first urban artist from Colombia. Balvin won New Artist, Latin Rhythm Song of the Year, and Latin Rhythm Song Artist of the Year, where he dedicated the award to his home country of Colombia.

In June 2015, it was announced that Balvin had cancelled his performance on Miss USA 2015 to protest Donald Trump's inflammatory comments insulting illegal immigrants, saying, "During [Trump's] presidential campaign kickoff speech last week [June 2015], Trump accused illegal immigrants of bringing drugs, crime and rapists to the U.S." His live performance had been scheduled for 12 July 2015 in Louisiana, which would have been Balvin's first performance on national mainstream television.

=== 2016–2017: Energia ===
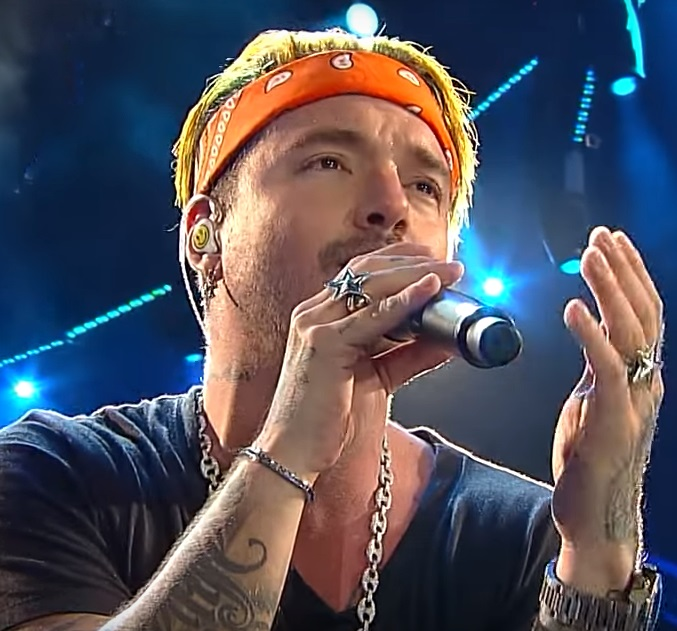
Balvin performing "Sigo Extrañándote" in Chile in March 2017

On 16 January 2016, Balvin premiered his new single "Ginza" from his upcoming album, at the Premios Juventud. Later that week, he premiered the music video on Vevo. The music video broke the record for the most views for a Latin music video in the first 24 hours, at over two million views. Since then, the video has racked up over 807 million views. The song reached number one on Billboard's Hot Latin Songs chart for the week of 17 October 2015. The song also set a new Guinness World Record for the longest stay at number one on the chart. Balvin became the first artist to receive a diamond certification in the Latin field from the Recording Industry Association of America, denoting digital sales of 600,000 units for his songs "6 AM" and "Ay Vamos". Andrew Casillas of Rolling Stone wrote that "with its deliciously liquid beat, ["Ginza"] among the finest three minutes in reggaetón history."

On 24 June 2016, Balvin released his third studio album Energia. Energia debuted at number one on the Billboard Top Latin Albums chart, signifying his first time topping that chart. It had the third-best debut sales of any Latin artist in 2016, after Juan Gabriel's Los Duo 2 and Banda Sinaloense MS de Sergio Lizarraga's Que Bendicion. It also debuted at number 38 on the all-genre Billboard 200. The album features collaborations with Daddy Yankee, Juanes, Pharrell, and Yandel. He launched 3 hit singles from the album, "Bobo," "Safari," and "Sigo Extranandote," which all reached the top 10 of the Latin charts. "Bobo" spent a week at the top of the Billboard Hot Latin Songs chart. Mario Prunes of AllMusic described Energia as "an album that knew it was going to be an international blockbuster almost a year before its release," due to the success of "Ginza". Rolling Stone ranked the album number four on the magazine's list of the 10 Best Latin Albums of 2016.

In promotion of the album, Balvin embarked on the Energia Tour, traveling with several special guests including French Montana, Zion & Lennox, Bad Bunny, and Steve Aoki, the latter of whom appeared as a surprise for fans during the last stop of the tour in Miami. That same year, Balvin featured on "Cuando Seas Grande" by Spanish musician Alejandro Sanz and American singer Sofia Carson´s "Love is the Name". He launched a partnership with SoundCloud and Buchanan's Whiskey in a project called Es Nuestro Momento, where fans can access Balvin's previously unreleased a capella vocals and create personalised remixes of his songs. Buchanan's Whisky also served as a sponsor for the Energia Tour in honour of Hispanic Heritage Month.

=== 2017–2018: International success: "Mi Gente" and Vibras ===
On 30 June 2017, Balvin released his new single along with the official music video "Mi Gente" featuring Willy William. On 1 August 2017, "Mi Gente" became the number one song in the world according to Global Top 50 on Spotify. It soon reached 1 billion views on YouTube. In September 2017, the song was remixed with American artist Beyoncé. The remix reached number three in the United States, giving Balvin his first US top-ten single. Balvin and Willy William released six more "Mi Gente" remixes with Steve Aoki, Alesso, Cedric Gervais, Dillon Francis, Sunnery James & Ryan Marciano, and Henry Fong. Despite the song's success, "Mi Gente" did not win any awards at the 2017 Latin Grammy Awards, with many awards going to Luis Fonsi's hit "Despacito". At the ceremony, he performed "Mi Gente" as well as "Si Tu Novio Te Deja Sola" alongside Bad Bunny and his remix of "Unforgettable" with French Montana.

The cover of Balvin's 2018 album Vibras

On 19 January 2018, Balvin released his new single along with the official music video "Machika" featuring Jeon and Anitta. His collaboration with Nicky Jam, "X," was released on 1 March 2018, and the music video received 288 million views on YouTube in less than a month. Nicky Jam stated that he attributes the success of "X" to Balvin's contribution. He also appeared on Cardi B´s Invasion of Privacy album, with Bad Bunny on the song "I Like It". It became Balvin's first number one single on the US Billboard Hot 100, and first Diamond certification by the Recording Industry Association of America (RIAA).

Balvin released the album Vibras on 25 May 2018. The two lead singles from the album were "Machika" and "Ahora". On 23 April 2018, Balvin announced the dates for his Vibras tour revealing the 27 cities where he will be performing. Vibras claimed the record for the most-streamed Latin album in 24 hours on the streaming platform for 2018. In the United States, it debuted at number one on the Top Latin Albums chart for the issue dated 9 June 2018. According to Nielsen Music, the record sold 22,000 album-equivalent units and became Balvin's second number-one album on the chart, following Energia in 2016. Additionally, Vibras scored the largest streaming week ever for a Latin album by an artist; its songs were streamed 16.1 million times. Subsequently, it debuted at number 15 on the US Billboard 200 and became his highest-charting album on the chart.

In an interview with Ebro Darden for Beats 1 Radio on Apple Music in April 2018, Balvin described the sound of the record as 33% dancehall, 33% R&B, and 33% reggaeton. Balvin further elaborated that much love was put into the album's work and that contains different vibes, hence the name, Vibras, "The real meaning of this album was what's going on with Spanish music that's going so global, the fact that we did an album that the beats are so amazing that you don't have to understand what we say, you just have to love the songs."

=== 2019–2025: Oasis, Colores, Jose and collaborations ===
On 27 June 2019, Balvin released his new album in collaboration with Bad Bunny titled Oasis. The record was released overnight and was deemed a "surprise" release. The two artists first met at a Balvin concert in Puerto Rico, when Bad Bunny was working on releasing music on SoundCloud, and then collaborated on the 2017 track "Si Tu Novio Te Deja Sola". The chemistry between the two was so strong that they came up with the idea to release a joint album. Oasis peaked at number nine on the Billboard 200, and topped the Billboard US Latin Albums chart. The album was nominated for Best Latin Rock, Urban or Alternative Album at the 2020 Grammy Awards and was named one of Rolling Stone's Best Latin Albums of 2019.

In August 2019, Balvin and Bad Bunny headlined the Uforia Latino Mix Live concert series to raise money for victims of the shootings in Dayton, Ohio, and El Paso, Texas. The concert series consisted of two performances in Texas, one in Dallas and one in Houston, and featured openers Wisin & Yandel, Reik, Sech, Ozuna, Natti Natasha, Pedro Capó, Sebastián Yatra, Tito El Bambino. Balvin's collaboration with Spanish singer Rosalía "Con altura" won Best Urban Song at the 2019 Latin Grammy Awards. The song received positive reviews from critics and Billboard ranked it 5th on their list of 100 Best Songs of 2019. Balvin was a guest performer in the Super Bowl LIV halftime show headlined by Jennifer Lopez and Shakira. He also collaborated with Major Lazer and Dominican dembow singer El Alfa on the single "Que Calor" in September 2019.

In November 2019, Balvin released the music video for the single "Blanco", which introduced a "futuristic, all-white environment filled with hypnotic dancers and flying cats". On 20 March 2020, Balvin released the album Colores, in which every song is named after a colour except the song "Arcoíris" (the Spanish word for rainbow). The album contains influences from dancehall, R&B, and electronica, and features Nigerian afrobeats artist Mr Eazi on the song "Arcoíris". Suzy Exposito of Rolling Stone called the album "sophisticated show of Balvin's sonic palette". The album artwork was created by Japanese artist Takashi Murakami. Balvin collaborated with Murakami for the music videos and album and single artwork, which notably feature Murakami's flowers, as well as American clothing brand Guess on a capsule collection inspired by the album.

In 2021, Balvin released José, his sixth studio album. Later that year Balvin released a new song in collaboration with Pokémon for their 25th anniversary. Balvin also contributed a remix of the Metallica song "Wherever I May Roam" to the charity tribute album The Metallica Blacklist, released in September 2021. In December 2021, Balvin earned his 33rd No. 1 on the Billboard Latin Airplay Chart with "Una Nota", breaking the record for the most No. 1s on the chart.

On 25 March 2022, Balvin collaborated with the English singer Ed Sheeran in the songs "Sigue" and "Forever My Love".

On 22 June 2023, Balvin released the song "En Alta" with Omar Courtz, Quevedo and YOVNGCHIMI. Produced by Mambo Kingz & DJ Luian, it marked his return to music after a 10 month hiatus.

On 9 August 2024, he released Rayo, his seventh studio album. The album featured collaborations with Feid, Luar la L, Chencho Corleone, Ryan Castro, Blessd, Saiko, Bad Gyal, Dei V, Carín León and Zion.

On 5 February 2025, Crunchyroll announced that he would voice an "important role" in Solo Leveling, which would later be revealed as Kargalgan.

In 2024 he had his first acting role in the Canadian crime drama film Little Lorraine, which premiered at the 2025 Toronto International Film Festival.

== Artistry ==
=== Musical style and influences ===
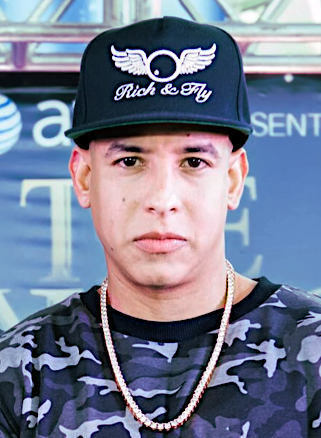
Balvin cites Daddy Yankee (pictured) as his biggest musical influence.

In an interview with Colombian newspaper El Tiempo, Balvin stated that he felt encouraged to pursue a career as a reggaeton artist after seeing that Daddy Yankee was of a lighter complexion and not Black, as he had assumed while listening to his music.

Critics have contrasted Balvin's musical style from the first internationally popular wave of reggaeton led by Daddy Yankee. Marlon Bishop of The Fader described his vocal delivery as a "gentle drawl", differing greatly from the rapid-fire, aggressive delivery of earlier reggaeton acts. He generally sings over his beats as opposed to rapping, and favors a more melodic, pop-influenced style. Describing his music's production, Bishop writes, "Instead of the hard-edged, maximalist beats of the first wave, Balvin's tracks are moody and spaced out". He frequently works with Medellín-based writer/producers Alejandro "Sky" Ramírez and Carlo Alejandro "Mosty" Patiño, whom he often name-drops in his songs. He has been credited with popularizing a new style of reggaeton based in Medellín, along with Maluma and Puerto Ricans who have relocated to the city to become involved in the reggaeton scene, such as Nicky Jam and Farruko.

Though he cites Daddy Yankee as his biggest musical inspiration, Balvin's earliest influences were rock bands such as Metallica and Nirvana, as well as salsa legend Hector Lavoe. He has covered Nirvana's hit "Smells Like Teen Spirit" in live performances. As a teenager, he listened to hip-hop artists such as 2Pac, The Notorious B.I.G., Snoop Dogg, Wu-Tang Clan, Bone Thugs-n-Harmony, and Onyx. He also cites albums by Canadian R&B singer the Weeknd and Puerto Rican reggae band Cultura Profética as his "desert island albums". He has also described Ricky Martin as a "teacher" and credited him as an artist who "opened the doors" for him. In 2018, he referenced Martin's hit "Livin' la Vida Loca" on the song "Reggaetón" since Martin "gave as clear a depiction of his actualized artistic dreams".

The singer says his collaboration with Beyoncé on the remix of "Mi Gente" was a crucial step in his career: "I think it was a really good cultural move. People see me with Queen Bey, so they feel that if she's working with me, it's because I'm an important artist. She doesn't work with everyone. All the other collaborations are really helping me to continue to spread the Latin vibe that I want."

Pop singer Camila Cabello has cited Balvin as a musical influence.

Puerto Rican singer Residente has criticized Balvin's musicianship. In a viral video post, he explained: “I have to admit from my heart that you have a talent, you have the talent of not having talent and make people believe that you do.” The remarks came after Balvin called for a boycott of the 2021 Latin Grammys due to the alleged lack of nominations for urban music artists. Colombian artist Lido Pimienta has also argued that Balvin is more of an entertainer than an artist. Balvin has also been accused of cultural appropriation, which noted reggaeton historian Katelina Eccleston references in an interview for Paper Mag, specifically the song, "In Da Getto." According to Eccleston, "This track highlights the issue of Black Latinos being spoken for without consideration of their plight."

=== Public image and lyrics ===
His public image was described by Bishop, saying "J Balvin's not a bad boy, he's a good guy with a well-tended naughty side." He often interacts with fans on social media sites such as Snapchat and Instagram, and cites these platforms as essential for his success. His musical partner Mazo explained, "We wanted to make music that was clean enough for your grandma to like, but sensual enough that the streets would like it too." His lyrics have been described as more vulnerable than typical reggaeton lyrics, discussing interpersonal relationships, exemplified by the single "Ay Vamos". For this reason, he has been compared to Canadian artist Drake, a comparison with which Balvin agrees.

On the issue of misogyny in reggaeton, Balvin notes, "[I] have mothers, sisters, relatives. Part of what we did is change that misconception that reggaetón is machista and misogynist. On the contrary, women are our biggest fans, and they inspire us." He also refrains from singing about his country's violent past, saying that doing that exacerbates stereotypes about Colombians and that the country has made vast improvements since the days of Pablo Escobar. Instead, he discusses everyday life in his songs. Luis Estrada of Universal Music Latino and Capitol Latin says of Balvin, "He breaks every rule of what people think reggaeton is, and they love him for that...He doesn't take himself too seriously." Balvin is unique also in that his dance crew on his videos and concerts are all male.

Despite being fluent in English and frequently collaborating with English-speaking artists, Balvin plans to only sing in Spanish. His goal is to make reggaeton a globally popular genre without having to sing in English to attain crossover success. He explains, "I want to keep making history in Spanish. I want to invite the mainstream into my world, and to my sound, and to what I'm doing. And I want mainstream artists to respect me, and accept Latino artists as equals, without us having to sing in English. I want them to know that I can compete globally with whomever, in Spanish." American artist Pharrell instead sings the hook in Spanish on "Safari", and Balvin described having more non-Latino musicians singing in Spanish as one of his "biggest dreams". However, he recorded his first all-English song with Pitbull and Camila Cabello for the 2017 soundtrack to The Fate of the Furious, known as "Hey Ma", and explained that he is open to the idea of singing in English if the opportunity presents itself.

Balvin has often been criticized for his ambiguous support of mass uprisings in his native Colombia. He failed to explicitly condemn rampant police violence during the 2019 and 2021 national strikes in Colombia, leading in the latter case to a significant drop in streaming of his music within the country. but later on, Balvin called for help for his country from his Instagram and Twitter accounts and shared posts about many events in his country. He tagged world-famous artists such as Selena Gomez, Justin Bieber and Katy Perry in the photos he shared to make the voice of his country and people heard in foreign media. In this way, many European and Asian followers of Balvin learned about the events in Colombia. During the 2021 national strike, Balvin was also accused of using images from the protests to promote his autobiographical documentary film, which was set to premiere later in the summer. Balvin's support for protests in Cuba via the hashtag #SOSCuba also drew criticism from Colombians who felt that Balvin had not commented on protests in Colombia in a timely fashion. Balvin's 2020 interview with journalist Vicky Dávila stirred controversy when he referred to current president Ivan Duque and former president Alvaro Uribe as "cool guys" despite both men being accused of significant human rights abuses. Balvin, who also gave an interview during the protests in Colombia. "I know what's going on in my country, people are right to beg for help on many issues, it's so painful but is it my fault? no it's not. I've never seen J Balvin's name on the ballot."

In response to the widespread George Floyd protests, Balvin tweeted out #EveryLivesMatter and #LatinoLivesMatterToo. After the ensuing outrage Balvin stated, "After taking time to speak to those close with me, I am educating myself on the deep significance and horrifying history that is the root of the #blacklivesmatter movement." However, Balvin would again face accusations of anti-black racism upon the release of the music video for his song, "Perra," which featured Balvin walking with two Black women on leashes. Balvin later made a lengthy statement in which he apologized. He apologized to all women, especially his mother, and said that this song is about sex and sexuality, and that sex slavery is a reality in the world. He deleted the song from YouTube, stating that he didn't want anyone to feel humiliated and bad because of this song. In yet another incident, Balvin accepted the award for "Afro-Latino Artist of the Year" from the 2021 African Entertainment Awards USA. The news provoked strong reactions on social media, including discussion around Balvin's global success as a non-black artist profiting off a genre of music primarily created by Black artists. The name of the award was changed to "Best Latin Artist of the Year" and Balvin, who is not black, deleted his original Instagram post. also on his Instagram story, "I'm so misunderstood about this, I'm not afro Latina but I have accepted this award for my contribution to the genre thanks to my collaborations with afro Latin artists". At the same time, many Balvin fans argued that the problem was not with Balvin but with the awards ceremony.

=== Fashion ===
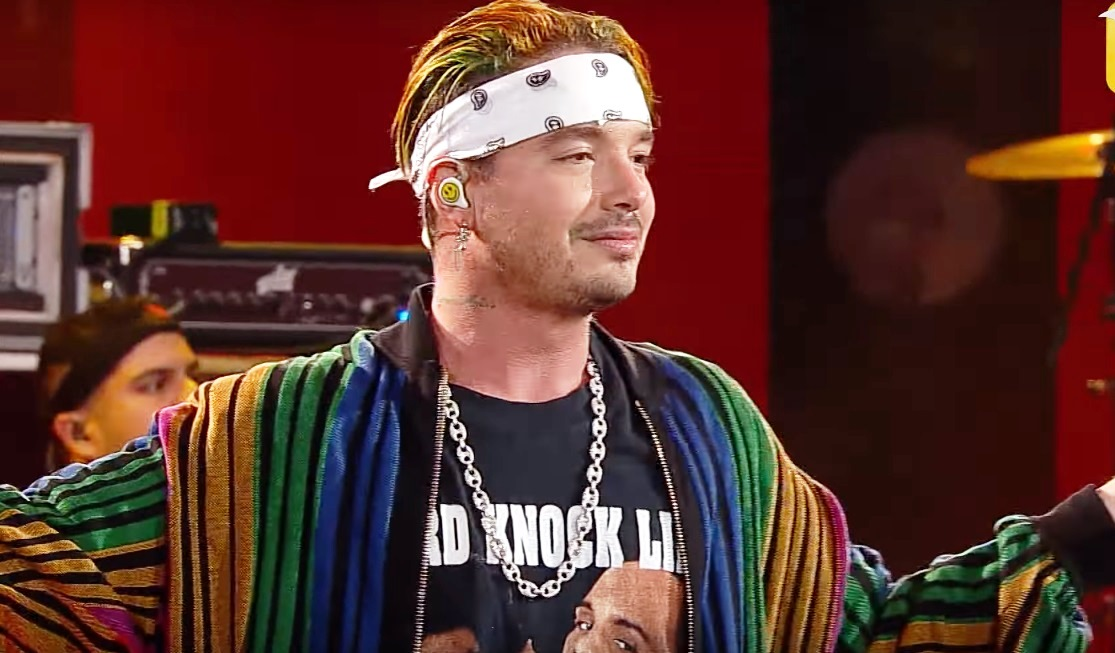
Balvin is noted for his eccentric style, often wearing bright colors and dyeing his hair.

Balvin has called fashion "his life's passion, on the same level as music." He appeared as an ambassador during the 2017 New York Fashion Week, and has called for greater representation of Latinos in the fashion world. He utilizes eccentric accessories such as cowboy hats, colorful tracksuits, and ripped jeans. Isabela Raygoza described his aesthetic at the 2017 Latin Grammys as a "Latin raver Eminem" due to his neon blonde hair and brightly colored athletic clothing. His style often combines streetwear traditionally associated with reggaeton artists and classic luxury brands. Balvin is influenced by musicians such as Kanye West and Pharrell Williams who have made forays into fashion. Discussing Pharrell's influence, Balvin explained, "I don't dress exactly like him, but I want to be like him in the cultural way. He opens the doors for a lot of new fashion designers and creates his own style. It's all about love with him and he's the culture."

The musician appeared in Ovadia and Sons' Spring 2017 catalogue. He debuted pieces that he designed in the Colombiamoda Fashion Week show in Medellín in July 2018, where he presented his collaboration with the clothing brand Gef France. The collection was inspired by the colorful, bright aesthetic of his 2018 album, Vibras. While at Coachella festival in 2018, he met avant-garde stylist, designer and techno DJ Sita Abellán, who took him on as her sole styling client. In January 2019 Balvin launched another Vibras-inspired clothing campaign with the Guess x J Balvin clothing collection, becoming the first Latin man to collaborate with the brand. Balvin explained that he "grew up with the Guess brand" and "always respected and identified with the Marciano brothers' history of taking influence from the country and culture of their heritage, and fusing it with the spirit of the United States". In Spring 2020, Balvin co-curated 'GUESS x J Balvin Colores', with stylist Sita Abellán. He was also the first Latin artist to be awarded the best stylist of the year by the J Balvin FNAA awards. however, since 2016, Balvin has been called the "style icon of reggaetón music" in Latin America, thanks to his hairstyles, dressing and different fashion ideas in the reggaetón genre. because no reggaetón artist has ever been ambitious and fashion-conscious before balvin. Collaborating with Nike in 2020, Balvin became the first Latin artist to collaborate with Nike. however, the shoe he designed was sold out within 1 minute, breaking the sales record on the official Nike website. Balvin, who later participated in events such as the Met gala and Paris fashion week. In 2022, he collaborated with Guess again and released a new collection called Amor. This new collaboration, which appeared in countries such as the United States, Japan and Italy, was highly appreciated. Balvin will receive the international style icon award at the ACE awards in August 2022.

Building on his partnership with Nike, Balvin looks to release his Air Jordan 2 collaboration sneaker in 2022 along with new apparel pieces from this forthcoming capsule. The Colombian crooner's AJ 2 is expected to be embellished in cloud-like patterns, and its matching sweatsuit is designed to mimic the same motif.

In 2023, Balvin was awarded 'Fashion Icon of The Year' at the Latin American Fashion Awards, held in the Dominican Republic- to mark the occasion he received a trophy designed by Salvadoran artist, Studio Lenca.

== Personal life ==
Balvin has spoken out about the Venezuelan economic crisis and the situation occurring at the country's border with Colombia, where thousands of Venezuelans have been forcibly deported. He called the situation "deplorable" and created the social media campaign #LatinosSomosFamilia (We Latinos Are Family), encouraging fans to sign a petition to support the displaced victims. The petition was soon signed by other prominent Latin artists including Colombian singer Maluma. Balvin's campaign was launched shortly after cancelling his performance on Miss USA 2015 in protest of Donald Trump.

He supports LGBT rights, explaining "It's all about love. A lot of my closest friends are gay", and dyed his hair rainbow colors to show support for Pride 2019.

In August 2016, the singer was involved in a plane crash while leaving the Bahamas. While returning from a vacation with his family, the plane failed to take off properly and crash landed shortly after departing from the runway. He posted a photo on Instagram of the small private plane after having landed in the bushes. Nobody was injured in the accident, and Balvin called it "a miracle".

Balvin has experienced panic attacks and stated that "meditation saved [his] life". When his anxiety was at its worst, he recalled that "I forgot about my happiness. I forgot about José (his given name)." He is known for his tattoos and got his first tattoo when he was twelve years old. His mother has the rare genetic condition acute intermittent porphyria, which causes seizures, chronic pain, and mental health difficulties. He has the word "Familia" tattooed on his chest in her honor.

Unlike many popular reggaeton singers who move to the United States upon gaining popularity, Balvin continues to live in his hometown of Medellín, explaining, "It keeps me real. I'm gonna be real everywhere I go, but I'm with my people, I'm connected to my roots – I'm in my country! I don't need to live somewhere else. I respect the ones who make it and leave their home base, but I'm good in Colombia." He declared he has a home in New York, but he lives mostly in Medellín.

In 2020, it was revealed that Balvin contracted COVID-19, but he has since recovered.

Balvin began dating the Argentine model and Miss Argentina 2014 Valentina Ferrer in 2018. On 27 June 2021, the couple's first child, a boy, was born in New York City. In September 2026, the couple confirmed the end of their relationship.

== Impact ==
Balvin's global success with his Spanish recordings has been praised by music critics. According to the International Federation of the Phonographic Industry (IFPI) "he has pioneered Latin music's explosion onto the global stage". Billboard described him as "the biggest breakout act Latin music has seen in many years". Nicole Acevedo of NBC News said that although Latin artists such as Ricky Martin, Enrique Iglesias and Shakira achieved crossover success by recording English-language albums, "Balvin is reinventing the way Latin music artists cross over to the U.S. music scene" with musical productions recorded entirely in Spanish. Similarly, August Brown of Los Angeles Times commented that "Balvin's ideas felt like an inevitable future" and is part of a new wave of several Latin artists representing the "future of Latin and global pop where language is less a barrier than a invitation".

Balvin has been noted for his influence on the reggaeton genre, incorporating African, electronic, and Caribbean elements across four albums. During this period, Latin music saw increased global consumption on digital platforms. According to the International Federation of the Phonographic Industry, streaming generated $8.9 billion globally in 2019, with Latin music representing a portion of that growth. Balvin has collaborated with artists including Bad Bunny, Anitta, and Karol G, and signed Dominican rapper La Gabi to his label.

Balvin's participation in the reggaeton scene has been noted, a genre previously associated primarily with Puerto Rican and Panamanian artists. He uses reggaeton as a vehicle to Ovexpose ideas, identities and other social messages, and is "perhaps the genre's most visible star" according to American journalist Jon Caramanica. Elias Leight of Rolling Stone included him along Karol G and Ozuna as "global hit-makers" with reggaeton and Latin trap songs. When Joan Scutia from Mexican Vogue reviewed Balvin's career and success, noted that reggaeton is part of Simon Reynolds' theory about globalization in music: "Nothing is foreign in an internet age". Evan Lamberg, UMPG's president commented: "I consider J Balvin one of the greatest global contemporary songwriters/artists in any genre".

In a general perspective, Sofia Rocher from Guinness World Records stated Balvin became "leader of a second-generation reggaeton revolution propelling Urban music back to the forefront of Latin music worldwide". Univision presented him as "Latin Music's most popular and influential international artist". He was the first Latino to headline world-musical events such as Coachella, Tomorrowland, and Lollapalooza. Major sources praised J Balvin after the Coachella performance. In an article published by Rolling Stone, "J Balvin represented Latino gangs old and New on the set of live Saturday - the Colombian superstar made history on the Coachella stage... in a moment of confusion of Latinx pride". Entertainment Tonight, "J Balvin celebrates reggaeton with a Live Coachella performance - he knows how to get the crowd excited". "An astonishing set ... a monumental achievement - one of the greatest achievements Coachella has ever seen," commented Variety, who previously awarded Balvin the best collaborator of the year. "J Balvin led the wave of Latin pop at Coachella... no artist represents the future of the festival better than J Balvin" - "J Balvin's historic performance honors reggaeton legends", the Los Angeles Times and Remazcla expressed their admiration.

Iman Amrani from The Guardian felt that Balvin is "now arguably Colombia's biggest cultural export" and described him as example on "how embracing national pride can be a force for cultural good". When describing J Balvin in the NOW and THEN magazine article, "J Balvin is a legend and the most influential reggaeton artist today" defined it. then Consequence of Sound called it "the evolution and future of reggaeton music". After inviting J Balvin to the cover of their magazine, Forbes announced, "J Balvin is one of the most influential reggaeton artists of this modern age". The Wall Street Journal called him "the highest level of global stardom".

== Awards and achievements ==
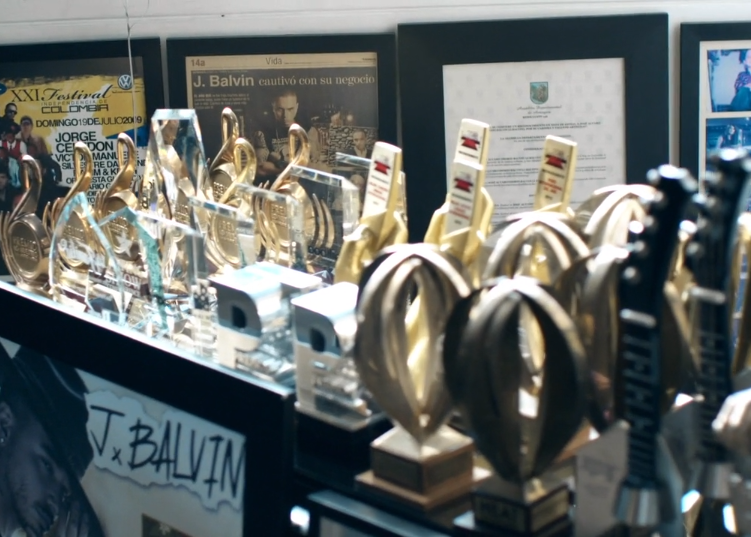
Trophies received by J Balvin, photographed in 2018

Balvin has won numerous awards and achievements. He became the first recipient of the Global Icon Award given by Lo Nuestro Awards, in recognition of his contribution to spread Latin music worldwide, and the first recipient of the inaugural Contemporary Song of the Year at the BMI Latin Awards with "Ay Vamos". Additionally, he received a Guinness World Records by the most Latin Grammy nominations in a single year, with 13 in 2020. They also recognized his single "Ginza" for the longest stay at number 1 on Hot Latin Songs chart ever by a single artist. Balvin is the artist with the most #1 singles on the Latin Rhythm Airplay (34) and Latin Airplay (35) charts.

His music videos have billions of views, and had a consecutive record-setting of 100 million views on VEVO with "Tranquila", 6 A.M.", "Ay Vamos" and "Ginza", which marked the most viewed Spanish video debut in history. "Ay Vamos" became the first reggaeton song to exceed one billion views on YouTube. In addition, VEVO named Balvin the "most watched Latin artist of 2015" and he became the "most viewed artist on YouTube Global" as of 2019. Balvin has multiple streaming records. "Mi Gente" is the first Spanish-language song to be number one on Spotify's Global Top 50 Chart, and he became the most streamed artist on Spotify as of 2018, overtaking Drake's previous record. He remains in the Top 5 as of April 2020. With his album Colores set a new record with all his songs occupying the Top 10 on Spotify. Additionally, he became the first Latin artist to reach one billion streams on Apple Music. His other achievements include selling 35 million singles worldwide, and having 91.1 billion stream as of 2023, YouTube and Spotify.

== Filmography ==
=== Films ===
- Trolls World Tour (2020)
- Little Lorraine (2025)

== Discography ==
Solo studio albums

- La Familia (2013)
- Energía (2016)
- Vibras (2018)
- Colores (2020)
- Jose (2021)
- Rayo (2024)
- Mixteip (2025)

Collaborative studio albums

- Oasis with Bad Bunny (2019)
- Omertà with Ryan Castro (2026)

== Tours ==
=== Headlining ===
- La Familia Tour (with Becky G) (2015)
- Energía Tour (2016–2018)
- Vibras Tour (2018)
- Arcoiris Tour (2019)
- José Tour (2022) [cancelled]
- Que Bueno Volver a Verte Tour (2024)
- Back To The Rayo Tour (2025)
- Ciudad Primavera Tour Colombia (2026)

=== Supporting ===
- The Sun Comes Out World Tour (2011)
- Sex and Love Tour (2014)

== See also ==
- List of best-selling Latin music artists
