= The Laden Showroom =

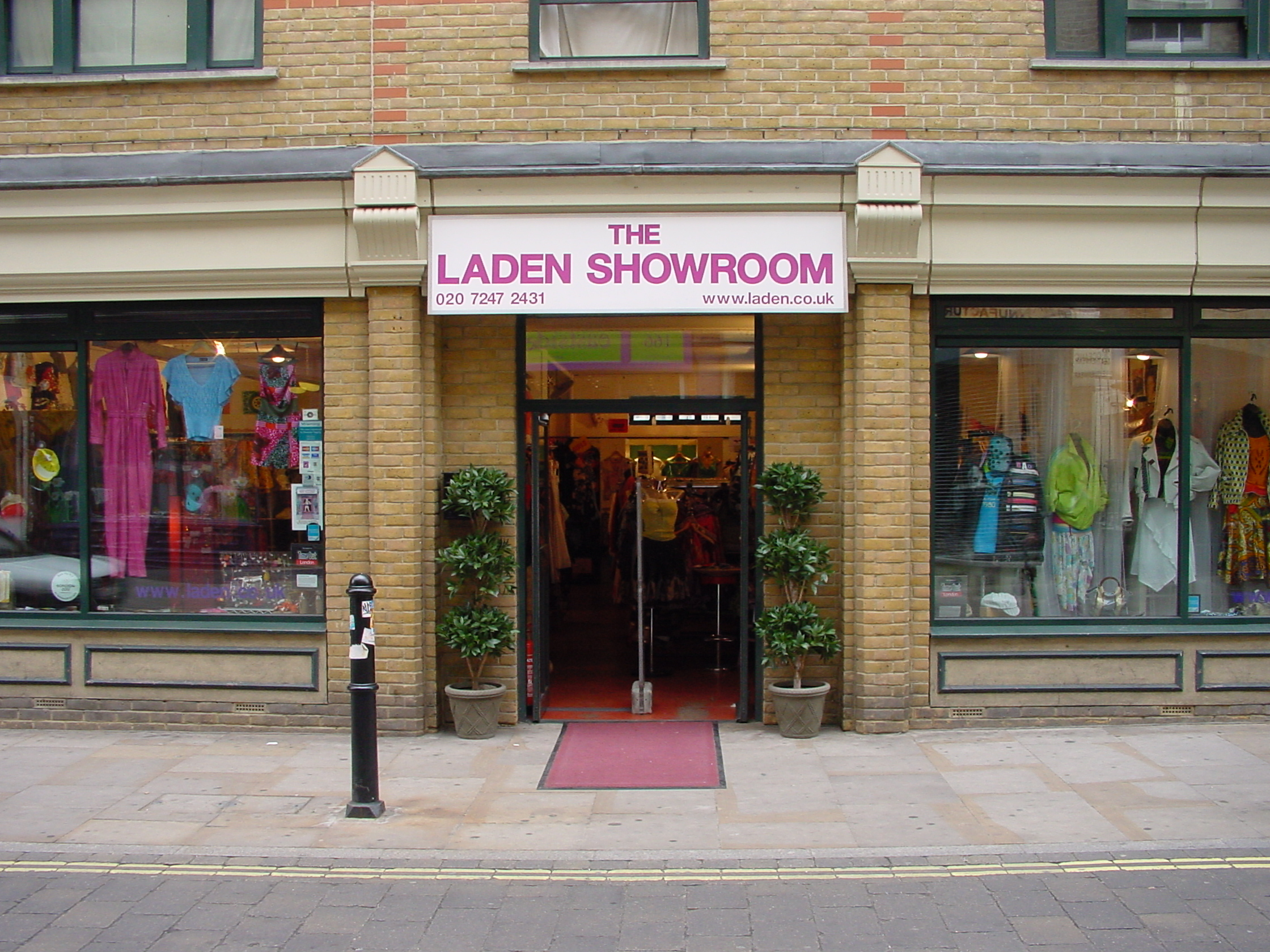
The Laden Showroom

The Laden Showroom was a London showroom and store focused on young and independent fashion designers. Time Out Magazine described the shop as "cutting-edge but very affordable designer clothing from the hottest independent talent on the scene is second to none" while the London Evening Standard said it "has a strong celebrity following" EasyJet described the store as "a veritable magnet for keen-eyed fashionistas" in its inflight magazine, recommending The Laden Showroom to London visitors.

Established in 1999 at 103 Brick Lane, London, by sister and brother team, Adele and Barry Laden MBE, and closing in December 2016, the model for The Laden Showroom was founded on social entrepreneurial principles, where designers rented low-cost space to display and sell their products without being tied to contract.

The Laden Showroom was a finalist in the London Evening Standard O2 Inspiration Award for Business, announced on 25 January 2007.
