= Delaney card =

Method of classroom management

Front and back of a typical Delaney card

The Delaney card (a.k.a. Visual Seating Plan) is a method of classroom management. This small one-by-three-inch card has been used extensively in the New York metropolitan area since the 1950s. Each Delaney card contains the name of one student in class, and lists the name, telephone number, address and other vital information for each student.

== The card ==
Each Delaney card contains the name of one student in class, and lists their names, telephone numbers, addresses and other vital information of each student. The teacher keeps a large book with sturdy slotted cardboard pages, with a Delaney card in each slot. The cards are arranged alphabetically by student last name, or placed according to the position of each student's desk. One side of the card has the school year's months and days printed in columns so that the teacher can keep track of the student's attendance. The other side contains the student's contact information, as well as a grid that is usually used by the teacher to mark class participation. The sides are also printed in different colors, and typically the card is flipped over to mark an absence, to remind the teacher the next day of a previous absence. The Visual Seating Plan card system was invented and implemented by Edward C. Delaney, a Harvard University graduate, and teacher at DeWitt Clinton High School in the Bronx, who died in 1969.

== Criticism ==
Teachers in settings where the Delaney system is used often must keep track of hundreds of students; a typical teacher may handle 170 pupils per day. Progressive educators criticize the Delaney book because it encourages impersonal treatment by the teacher. "The cardinal sin was to treat a student like a Delaney card," recalled a teacher at New Utrecht High School.

As students are asked to fill in the cards themselves, falsification of information is common. Phone numbers and addresses listed may not actually belong to the pupil. As a prank, students have been known to obtain extra Delaney cards and create cards using false names or fictional characters such as Clark Kent.

== In popular culture ==
Delaney cards often appear in works of fiction set in the New York City public school system. They are discussed in Evan Hunter's 1953 novel, The Blackboard Jungle. The Delaney system also makes an appearance in the 1965 novel (and the 1967 film version of) Up the Down Staircase by Bel Kaufman.
