= Designer clothing =

Expensive luxury clothing

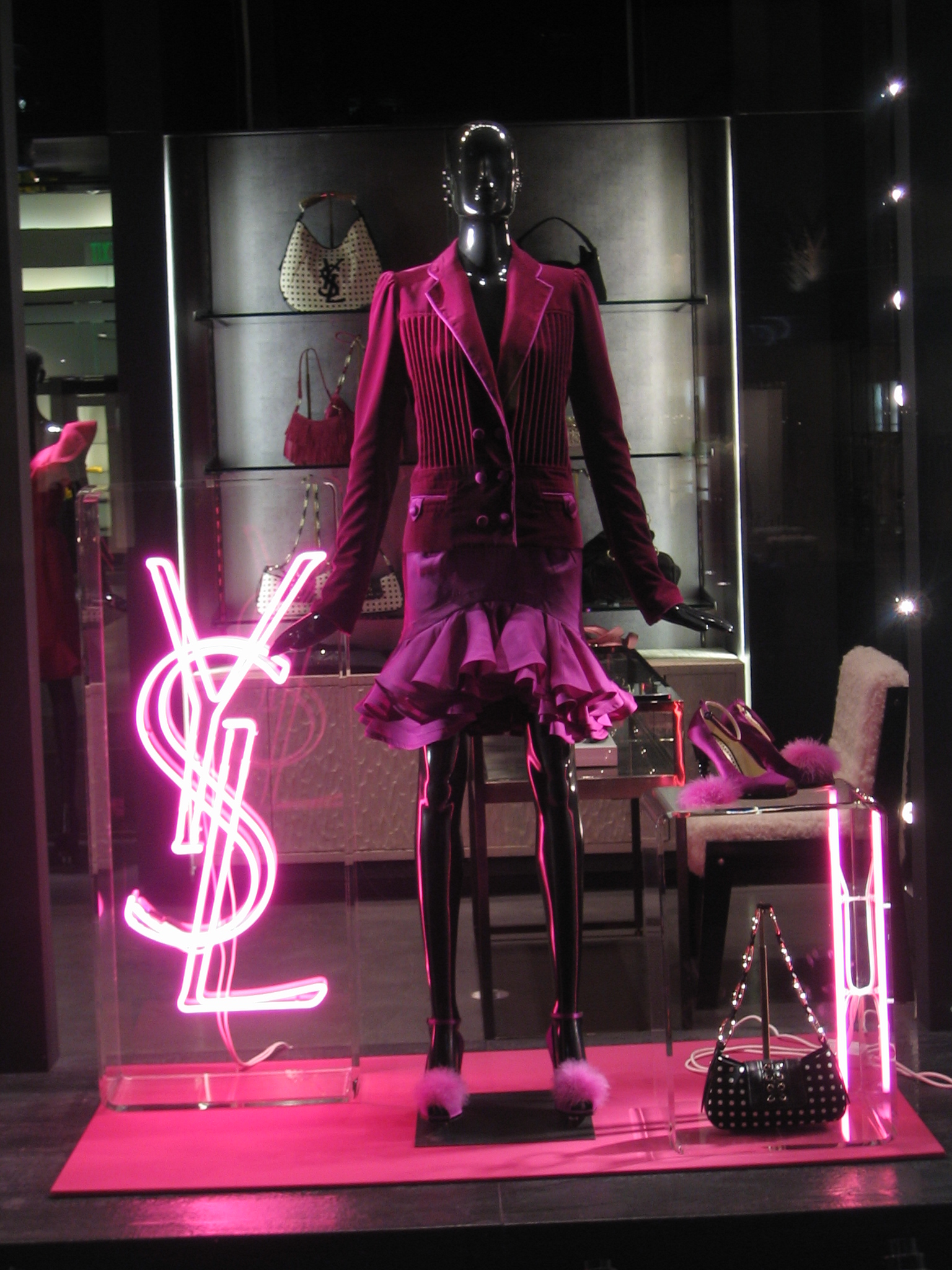
Designer clothing in a shop window in Beverly Hills

Designer clothing refers to apparel created by a specific fashion designer or licensed by a person or brand. It is often considered luxury clothing, known for its high quality and haute couture appeal, made for the general public and bearing the label of a renowned designer. Licensing designer names has been a common practice within the fashion industry since the 1970s. Designer clothing includes a wide range of apparel, such as designer jeans, which can often cost several hundred dollars.

== Description ==
Designer clothing originally referred to apparel created by a specific designer. The definition has since expanded to include designs licensed by a designer or company. Licensing designer names was pioneered by designers like Pierre Cardin in the 1960s and has been a common practice within the fashion industry since the 1970s. Designer clothing is often expensive, luxury apparel known for its high quality and haute couture appeal, made for the general public and bearing the label of a well-known fashion designer.

== Brands ==
Brands are often used to identify designer clothing. However, designer clothing may not always be created by the founder of the company. For instance, the actual designer behind Chanel today is not its original founder, Gabrielle Chanel, but French designer Virginie Viard. The quality of the clothing and its degree of resemblance to the designer's original work can vary significantly depending on the licensee and the terms of the agreement made with the designer. Some agreements may limit the number of garment styles that can be produced, allowing the designer to veto any designs they find unappealing. Examples include:

- Armani
- Alexander Wang
- Balenciaga
- Balmain
- Berluti
- Bottega Veneta
- Burberry
- Calvin Klein
- Chanel
- Céline
- Christian Louboutin
- Diesel
- Dior
- Dolce & Gabbana
- Escada
- Fendi
- Givenchy
- Gucci
- Hermès
- Jean Paul Gaultier
- Jil Sander
- Karl Lagerfeld
- Kenzo
- Loewe
- Longchamp
- Louis Vuitton
- Marc Jacobs
- Max Mara
- Michael Kors
- MISBHV
- Oscar de la Renta
- Ralph Lauren
- Philipp Plein
- Prada
- Saint Laurent Paris
- Salvatore Ferragamo
- Tod's
- Maison Margiela
- Valentino
- Versace
- Arooj Arts

== Types ==
Designer clothing includes a wide range of apparel, such as designer jeans.

=== Designer jeans ===
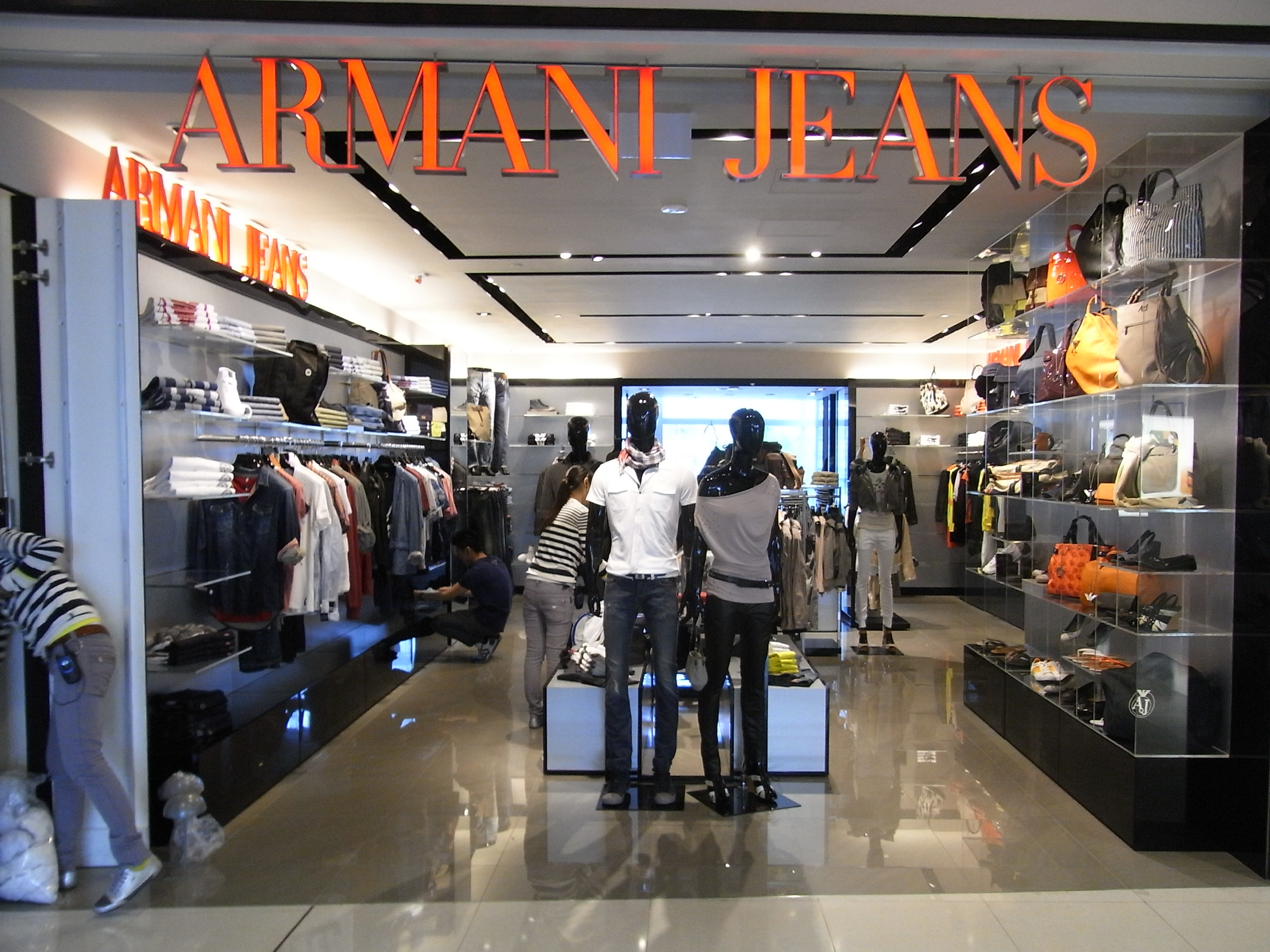
Staff working at the Armani Jeans store in the Hong Kong Central IFC Mall. 2012.

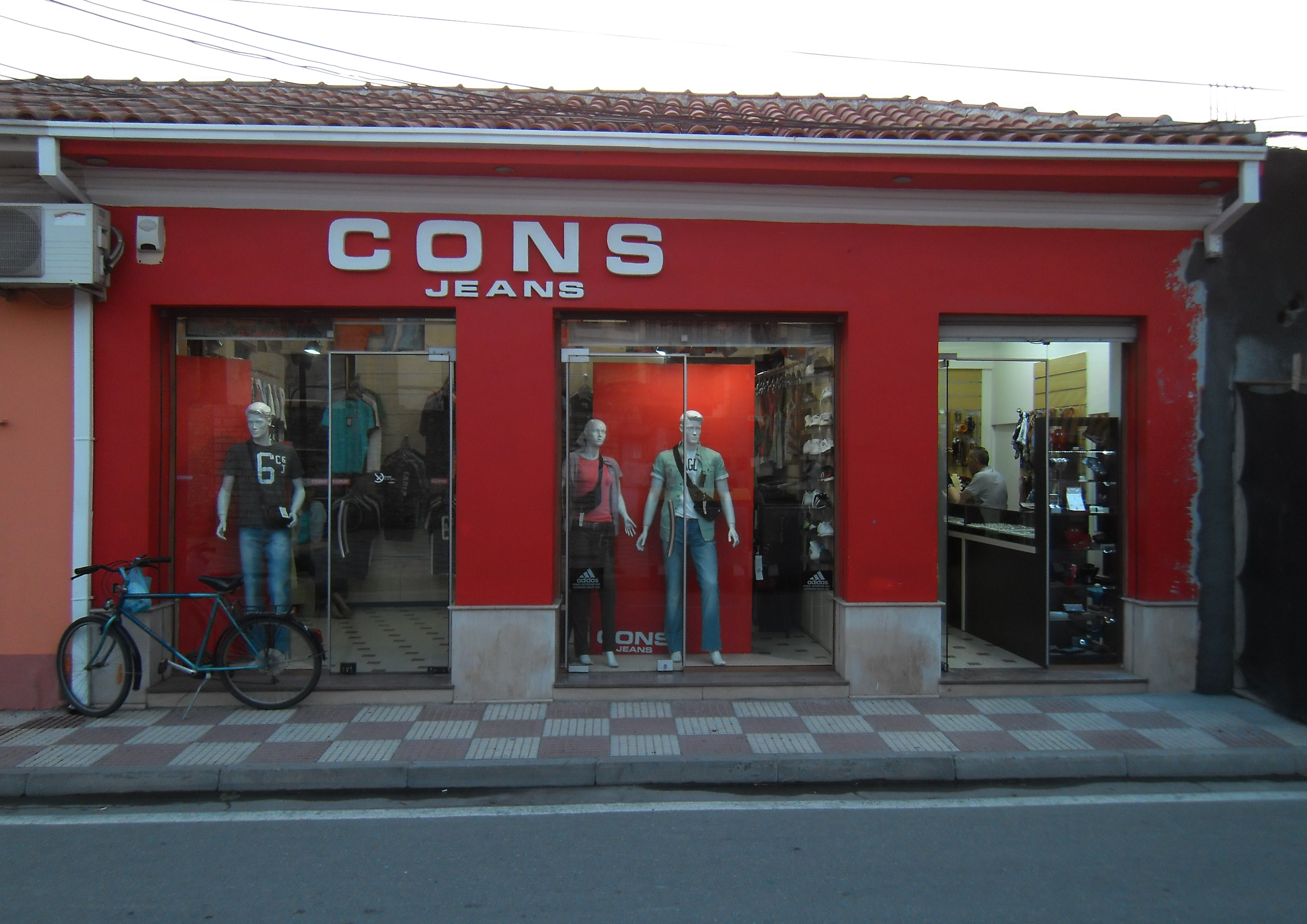
A shop named CONS Jeans in the Albanian city of Shkodra. 2008.

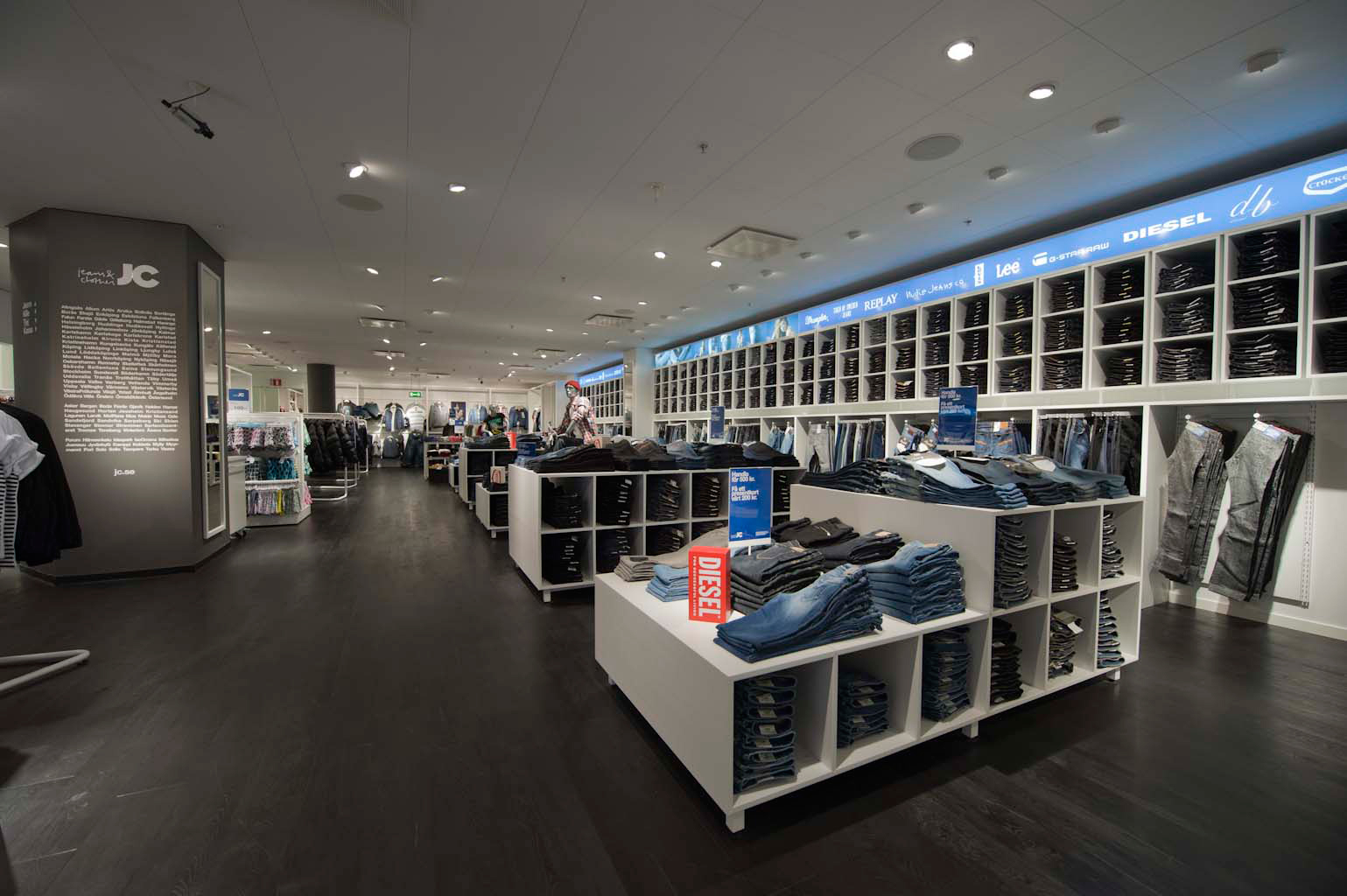
The interior of the JC Jeans and Clothes boutique in Stockholm, Sweden. 2011.

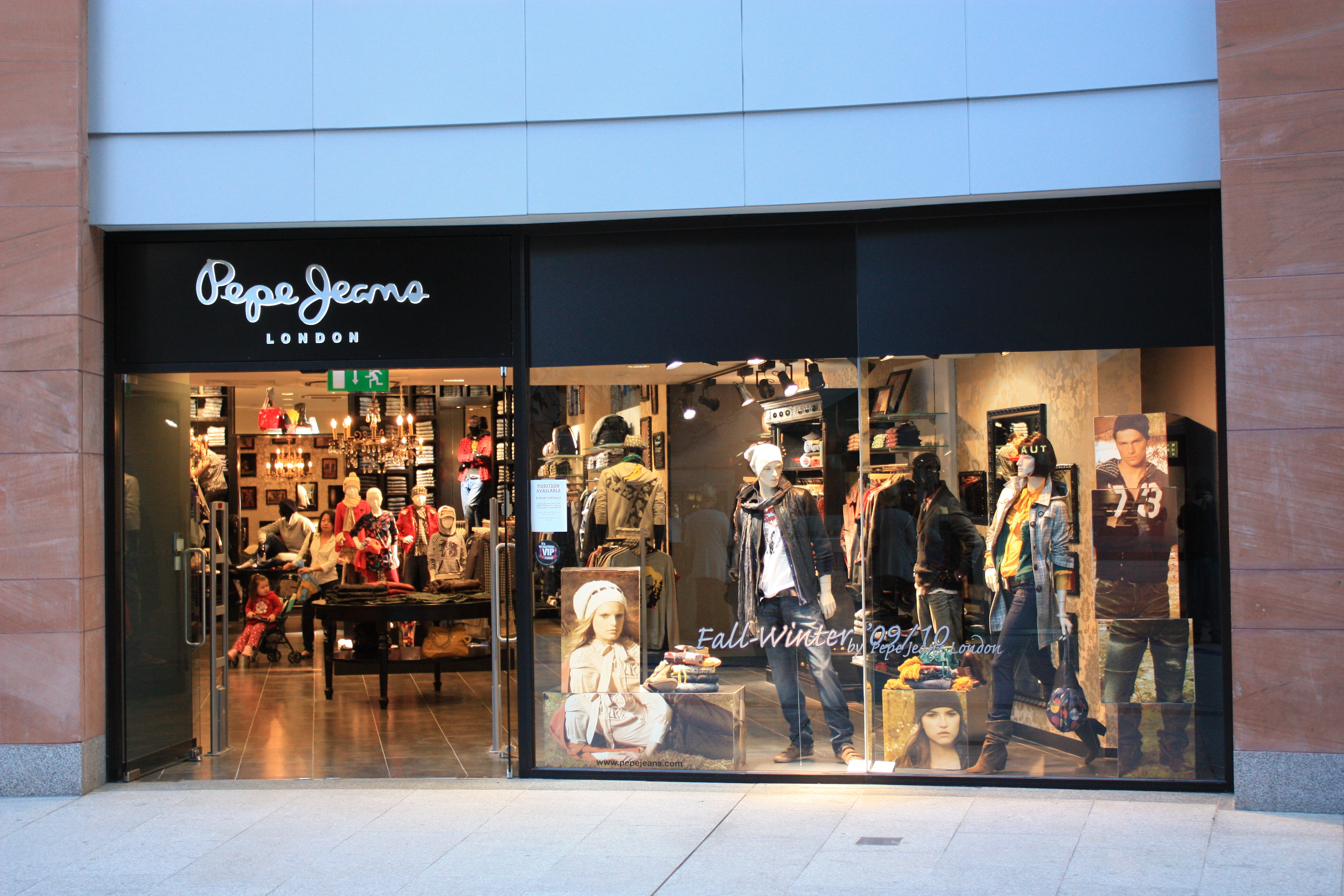
Facade of the Pepe Jeans boutique in Belfast, Northern Ireland. 2009.

Designer jeans are available at various price points, typically ranging in the hundreds of dollars, with some even approaching US$1,000. Before the Great Recession, premium denim was one of the fastest-growing categories in the apparel industry, and there seemed to be no limit to what customers would pay for the latest label, fit, finish, or wash.

Americans purchased US$59.2 billion worth of jeans in 2018, with over 450 million pairs sold, according to Alexander Eser. However, only about 1% of jeans sold in the U.S. that year cost more than $50. Since the "Great Recession," the landscape for premium jeans has changed. "Charging $600 for jeans for no reason at all — those days are over," said You Nguyen, the senior vice president of women's merchandising and design for Levi Strauss & Company.

The difference between $300 jeans and $30 jeans often comes down to factors such as fabric quality, hardware, washes, design details, abrasions, and the country of manufacture. A "fancy" pair of jeans that has been treated with abrasions, extra washes, and other techniques to break down the denim and achieve a worn-in texture undergoes a certain amount of damage in the process. As a result, the expensive jeans may be more delicate than the cheaper ones. Jeans brands also distinguish themselves from season to season by using patented materials, such as rivets and stitching, and by applying special washes and distressing techniques. These methods may include dyeing, pressing, and even using sandpaper or drills on the raw denim. Such processes can be particularly costly when done in the U.S., where factories must adhere to more stringent environmental and labor standards than in many low-cost nations.

To be produced domestically in the United States, jeans must be priced at "$200-plus," according to Shelda Hartwell-Hale, a vice president at Directives West, an L.A.-based division of the fashion consulting firm Doneger Group. The profit margins on premium jeans can be substantial. One retail executive notes that the gross profit margins for private-label jeans, which he manufactures for Wal-Mart Stores Inc., Sears Holdings Corp., and other retailers, are less than 20%, while the margins for his own premium lines range from 40% to 50%.

== See also ==
- History of Western fashion
- Digital fashion
- List of individual dresses
- Red carpet fashion
