= Sita Abellán =

Spanish DJ (born 1993)

- Born: Maria Abellán; 27 March 1993 (age 33)

Maria Abellán, known artistically as Sita Abellán, is a Spanish DJ, model, designer and stylist. Beginning her career in modelling, she was discovered through her content creation on Tumblr and Instagram, and has since come to prominence as a techno DJ, fashion and jewellery designer, and stylist. Her personal style is a fusion of '90s club kid, Harajuku girl and goth dominatrix.

== Career ==
Abellán was born on 27 March 1993. She grew up in Murcia in Southern Spain. In 2013 she moved to Milan where she studied advertising and public relations at the Catholic University of the Sacred Heart. Following this she was signed by the modelling agency Monster Management, booking both campaigns and runway shows. A regular user of Tumblr and Instagram, in 2015 Abellán's content was discovered by Rihanna, who went on to feature her as a model in her "Bitch Better Have My Money" video; the first of more high profile collaborations to come.

=== Fashion ===
Abellán designed her first, Japan-inspired, clothing collection, Pain, for Warsaw-based fashion label MISBHV. Later collaborations include a raver-inspired collection with Faith Connexion, and further capsule collections with brands HTC, MISBHV and Freak City, as well as designing a club kid peekaboo Fendi bag. Abellán walked in Rihanna's Fenty x Puma show in Paris (Fall 2016), and for Fausto Puglisi at Milan Fashion Week. She has also featured in fashion shoots for various indie magazines, as well as Glassbook and Nylon Mexico. Abellán styled Italian designer Riccardo Tisci for his Nike 2017 collaboration, and while at Coachella Festival in 2018 she met Reggaeton artist J Balvin, who would then become her sole styling client, going on to curate 'GUESS x J Balvin Colores' the fashion brand's 2020 campaign with him. In 2019 Abellán launched her own jewellery label, Lilith – named after the Biblical Jewish demonic figure. The first collection used snakes as a recurring motif, and a tarot card styled look book shot by photographer Jordan Hemingway.

=== Photography ===
In 2018 Abellán approached Kim Kardashian about collaborating on a photography shoot. Kardashian agreed and Abellán styled and photographed her at a mansion in Los Angeles, for ODDA magazine.

=== Dance music ===
From her teenage years Abellán was interested in synthesized music, discovering techno through her interest in industrial and electro sounds. As a hobby while living in her home town she began DJ-ing in a basement bar. She has since been a regular DJ at fashion designer Jeremy Scott's parties, had a residency at New York club Provocateur, played Up&Down and Flash Factory clubs in Manhattan, as well as performing in Ibiza, South America, Sónar Festival, Hard Summer Music Festival, and LA festival Hard Fest. Abellán has variously described her own music as "a little bit dark, somewhere between electro and techno", and as "electroclash with a little bit of techno". She has cited French electro clash outfit Miss Kittin and The Hacker as reference points, in addition to techno DJ's DarkHawk and Nicole Moudaber.
