= Good Behavior Game =

Classroom behavior management strategy

The Good Behavior Game (GBG) is a classroom management strategy used to increase self-regulation, group regulation and stimulate prosocial behavior among students while reducing problematic behavior. Major research at Johns Hopkins Center for Prevention and Early Intervention has studied three cohorts of thousands of student, some of whom have been followed from first grade into their 20s. In multiple scientific studies, the Good Behavior Game dramatically reduces problematic behavior within days and weeks.

The first study of GBG was published in 1969, using a 4th grade classroom. The study was the first application of applied behavior analysis to a whole classroom. In the original study, the classroom was divided into two teams. The students were to engage in the math or reading activities as teams. Paying attention, engaging in the lessons or activity, was the "good behavior". If students engaged in actions that interfered with the lesson (e.g., getting out their seat, interrupting), that was a penalty point against the team—much like playing a sport. Each team could make up a fixed number of mistakes, and still win the game. That is much like professional sports, except both teams could win. If a team won the game, they earned an activity reward normally not allowed, which was based on the Premack Principle. Since the original 1969 study, the Good Behavior Game has become an efficient system to aid in preventing mental, emotional, and behavioral disorders.

== Overview ==
The Good Behavior Game was first used in 1967 in Baldwin City, Kansas by Muriel Saunders, who was then a new teacher in a fourth-grade classroom. Muriel Saunders, Harriet Barrish (a graduate student at the University of Kansas), and the professor and co-founder of applied-behavior analysis, the late Montrose Wolfe, co-created the Good Behavior Game in 1969. The Game works by positive peer pressure of 2-to-5 classroom teams, who work together reduce inattentive, disturbing, disruptive, and destructive behaviors that interfere with learning and success. When the teams succeed, all the "winners" earn brief intrinsic activity rewards based on Premack's principle. While the teacher can define the behaviors to be reduced, the game can be just as effective when students define the behaviors to be reduced to make a better learning environment. A scientific major proponent of the benefits of GBG, Dennis Embry argues that the game is more likely to be acceptable, adopted, and sustained by teachers and students, when students actively participate in setting up the "rules" of the game. Students teams win the game by having very low rates of disturbing, disruptive, destructive, or inattentive behaviors. The teacher must respond to such problematic behaviors neutrally and unemotionally, and the person who committed the breach is not called out or given "consequences." Rather, the team has a point against it, not the individual. Teams who have less than a criterion of low points, win—typically less than 4 per team.

== Summary of Literature ==
Studies done by Harris and Sherman (1973) and Barrish, Saunders, and Wolf (1969) examined the effectiveness of the Good Behavior Game with one fifth-grade classroom and one sixth-grade classroom. Each teacher attended a 15-minute meeting prior to implementing the procedures in his or her classroom. During the meeting, the researchers defined disruptive behavior, explained the recording system, and reviewed the procedures of the Good Behavior Game. After baseline data was collected, the teachers divided the students into two teams, discussed the rules of the game, and outlined the contingencies. The reward was a 10-minute early dismissal at the end of the school day. Again, the researchers recorded talking and out-of-seat behavior during 30-minute observation sessions. Each session was divided into 30 one-minute intervals. If one or more of the children exhibited the disruptive behavior, the interval was scored as containing disruptive behavior. In addition to collecting data on disruptive behavior, the researchers evaluated the students' academic performance during two math periods in the fifth-grade classroom. In the sixth-grade classroom, several experimental manipulations (i.e., eliminating the consequences, changing the maximum number of marks needed to win, eliminating feedback, and keeping the class intact) were performed to identify which components of the game were the most effective in reducing disruptive behavior. The findings show that implementing the Good Behavior Game successfully reduced disruptive out-of-seat and talking behavior. Each of the following procedural components contributed to its effectiveness: permission to leave school early, the number of marks chosen as a criterion, and the division of students into teams. Furthermore, a reduction in problem behavior resulted in slightly higher accuracy rates on the independent math tasks.

Since the original 1969 study of the Good Behavior Game, there have been multiple randomized control trials conducted by Johns Hopkins University Center for Prevention and Early Intervention.

Studies have been conducted to evaluate the effectiveness of this intervention and have found numerous benefits including improvement in writing quantity and quality, math ability, student behavior, reducing aggression, and reducing disruptive behaviors.
