= Behave =

Behave may refer to:

- Behavior, the actions of organisms or systems
- "Behave" (Law & Order: Special Victims Unit), a television episode
- "Behave" (Benjamin Ingrosso song), 2018
- "(Someone's Always Telling You How To) Behave", a song by Chumbawamba, 1992
- "Behave", a song by Tired Lion from the album Dumb Days, 2017
- Behave: The Biology of Humans at Our Best and Worst, a 2017 book by Robert Sapolsky

== See also ==
- JBehave, a Java behavior-driven development framework
