= Behavior (disambiguation) =

Behavior, or behaviour, is the way a person or animal acts and reacts.

Behavior or behaviour may also refer to:

- Behaviour (journal), a scientific journal
- Behavior (film), a 2014 Cuban film
- Behaviour (Pet Shop Boys album), 1990
- Behaviour (Saga album), 1985
- Behaviour Interactive, a video game developer

== See also ==
- Ethology, the study of animal behavior
- Behaviorism, the systematic approach to understanding behavior
- Behavioralism, an approach in political science
- Good behaviour (disambiguation)
- Bad Behaviour (disambiguation)
- Search for Behavior
  - Search for Behavioral
