= Misbehaviour =

Misbehaviour or misbehavior may refer to:

- Misbehavior (film), a 2016 South Korean film
- Misbehaviour (film), a 2020 British film
- "Misbehaviour", a song on the 1985 album Behaviour
- "Misbehaviour", a song on the 2012 album Come of Age

== See also ==
- Human behavior
  - Anti-social behavior
  - Deviance (sociology)
  - Misconduct
- Missbehavior, a 2019 Hong Kong film
- Misbehaving (disambiguation)
