= Classroom management =

Aspect of educational work

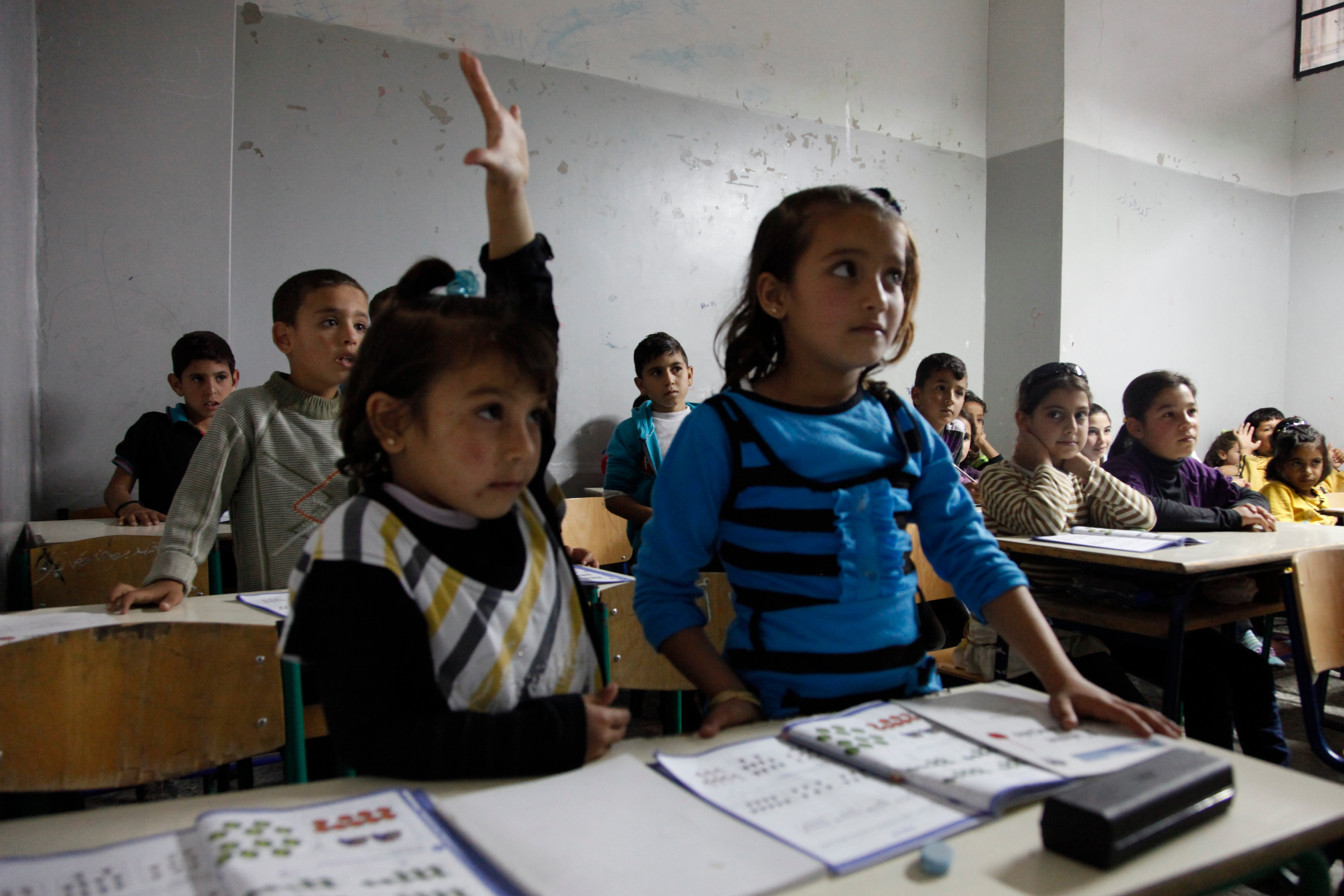
Establishing procedures, like having children raise their hands when they want to speak, is a type of classroom management technique.

Classroom management is the process teachers use to ensure that classroom lessons run smoothly without disruptive behavior from students compromising the delivery of instruction. It includes the prevention of disruptive behavior preemptively, as well as effectively responding to it after it happens. Such disruptions may range from normal peer conflict to more severe disturbances of the social class dynamics, such as bullying among students, which make it impossible for the affected students to concentrate on their schoolwork and result in a significant deterioration of their school performance.

It is a difficult aspect of teaching for many teachers. Problems in this area cause some to leave teaching. In 1981, the US National Educational Association reported that 36% of teachers said they would probably not go into teaching if they had to decide again. A major reason was negative student attitudes and discipline.

Classroom management is crucial in classrooms because it supports the proper execution of curriculum development, developing best teaching practices, and putting them into action. Classroom management can be explained as the actions and directions that teachers use to create a successful learning environment; indeed, having a positive impact on students achieving given learning requirements and goals. In an effort to ensure all students receive the best education it would seem beneficial for educator programs to spend more time and effort in ensuring educators and instructors are well versed in classroom management.

Teachers do not focus on learning classroom management, because higher education programs do not put an emphasis on the teacher attaining classroom management; indeed, the focus is on creating a conducive learning atmosphere for the students. These tools enable teachers to have the resources available to properly and successfully educate upcoming generations, and ensure future successes as a nation. According to Moskowitz & Hayman (1976), once a teacher loses control of their classroom, it becomes increasingly more difficult for them to regain that control.

Also, research from Berliner (1988) and Brophy & Good (1986) shows that the time a teacher must take to correct misbehavior caused by poor classroom management skills results in a lower rate of academic engagement in the classroom. From the student's perspective, effective classroom management involves clear communication of behavioral and academic expectations as well as a cooperative learning environment.

== Techniques ==
=== Good teacher-student relationships ===
Some characteristics of having good teacher-student relationships in the classroom involves the appropriate levels of dominance, cooperation, professionalism, and awareness of high-needs students. Dominance is defined as the teacher's ability to give clear purpose and guidance concerning student behavior and their academics. By creating clear expectations and consequences for student behavior, this builds effective relationships. Such expectations may cover classroom etiquette and behavior, group work, seating arrangements, the use of equipment and materials, and also classroom disruptions. These expectations should always be enforced with consistency among all students within the class. Inconsistency is viewed by students as unfair and will result in the students having less respect for the teacher. Assertive teacher behavior also reassures those thoughts and messages are being passed on to the student in an effective way. Assertive behavior can be achieved by using erect posture, appropriate tone of voice depending on the current situation, and taking care not to ignore inappropriate behavior by taking action. Another great strategy to build a good teacher- student relationship is using inclusive pronouns. For example, if a class is misbehaving and are getting off track, instead of saying "you need to get back to work" a teacher may say "we've got a lot of work to do today, so let's get back to it." Another technique to establishing good teacher-student relationships is William Purkey's "three pluses and a wish." These pluses are complimenting that the teacher gives to the student before making a request. The pluses help the student get into a mindset that is more likely to cooperate with the teacher. An example might look like this: "Thanks so much for your participation in class today. I love hearing your comments. I think you provided a fair amount of educational insight to the discussion. I would appreciate if you could raise your hand before commenting, so that other students can follow your example."

=== Student behavior report cards ===
Behavior report cards, where teachers evaluate students on their behavior and give feedback, were found effective in reducing disruptive student behavior.

=== Praise ===
Preventive techniques also involve the strategic use of praise and rewards to inform students about their behavior rather than as a means of controlling student behavior. To use rewards to inform students about their behavior, teachers must emphasize the value of the behavior that is rewarded and also explain to students the specific skills they demonstrated to earn the reward. Teachers should also encourage student collaboration in selecting rewards and defining appropriate behaviors that earn rewards. This form of praise and positive reinforcement is very effective in helping students understand expectations and builds a student's self-concept.

Using behavior-specific praise (BSP) in the classroom can have many positive effects on the students and classroom management. BSP is when the teacher praises the student for the exact behavior that the student is exhibiting. For example, the student might normally have trouble staying in their seat, which causes disruption in the classroom. When the student stays in their seat, the teacher might say that they are proud of the student for this behavior. This would help the student feel validated for a positive behavior and would increase the likelihood of the positive behavior happening again.

=== Over-planning ===
An often-overlooked preventative technique is to over-plan. Students tend to fill in the awkward pauses or silences in the class. When teachers over-plan, they have plenty of material and activities to fill the class time, thus reducing opportunities for students to have time to misbehave. Transition time can be an opportunity for students to be disruptive. To minimize this, transitions need to be less than 30 seconds. The teacher must be prepared and organized as well as students being prepared and organized for a day of learning. An organizational routine must be implemented at the beginning of the year and reinforced daily until it is instinctive.

=== The Blue vs Orange Card Theory ===
The blue card vs orange card theory was introduced by William Purkey, which suggests that students need supportive, encouraging statements to feel valuable, able, and responsible. "Many messages are soothing, encouraging and supportive. These messages are 'blue cards' - they encourage a positive self-concept. Other messages are critical, discouraging, demeaning. These cards are 'orange' – the international color of distress". The goal is to fill the students' 'file box' with more 'blue cards' than 'orange cards' to help with students' perspective of learning.

=== High cards and low cards ===
An intervention technique created by William Purkey, used by the teacher that gives students the level of management needed. Low cards are a less invasive intervention to address what is happening. Some examples of a low card intervention are: raising the eyebrows, staring politely at the student, moving closer to the student while continually talking, calling student by name and asking if they are listening. High cards are a strong intervention to address what is happening. Some examples include: sending student to the principal's office, keeping student after school, calling home.

=== Assertive discipline ===
Assertive discipline is an approach designed to assist educators in running a teacher-in-charge classroom environment. Assertive teachers react to situations that require the management of student behavior confidently. Assertive teachers do not use an abrasive, sarcastic, or hostile tone when disciplining students.

Assertive discipline is one of the most widely used classroom management tactics in the world. It demands student compliance and requires teachers to be firm. This method draws a clear line between aggressive discipline and assertive discipline. The standards and rules set in place by assertive discipline are supported by positive reinforcement as well as negative consequences. Teachers using this approach carry themselves confidently and have no tolerance for class disruption. They are not timid, and remain consistent and just.

=== Constructivist discipline ===
A constructivist, student-centered approach to classroom management is based on the assignment of tasks in response to student disruption that are "(1) easy for the student to perform, (2) developmentally enriching, (3) progressive, so a teacher can up the ante if needed, (4) based on students' interests, (5) designed to allow the teacher to stay in charge, and (6) foster creativity and play in the classroom." Compliance rests on assigning disciplinary tasks that the student will want to do, in concert with the teacher rapidly assigning more of the task if the student does not initially comply. Once the student complies, the role of the teacher as the person in charge (i.e. in loco parentis) has been re-established peacefully, creatively, and with respect for students' needs. Claimed benefits include increased student trust and long-term emotional benefits from the modeling of creative solutions to difficulties without resorting to a threat of violence or force.

=== Culturally responsive classroom management ===
Culturally responsive classroom management (CRCM) is an approach to running classrooms with all children [not simply for racial/ethnic minority children] in a culturally responsive way. More than a set of strategies or practices, CRCM is a pedagogical approach that guides the management decisions that teachers make. It is a natural extension of culturally responsive teaching, which uses students' backgrounds, rendering of social experiences, prior knowledge, and learning styles in daily lessons. Teachers, as culturally responsive classroom managers, recognize their biases and values and reflect on how these influence their expectations for behavior and their interactions with students as well as what learning looks like. There is extensive research on traditional classroom management and a myriad of resources available on how to deal with behavior issues. Conversely, there is little research on CRCM, despite the fact that teachers who lack cultural competence often experience problems in this area.

=== Discipline without Stress, Punishments or Rewards ===
Discipline without Stress (or DWS) is a K-12 discipline and learning approach developed by Marvin Marshall and described in his 2001 book, Discipline without Stress, Punishments or Rewards. The approach is designed to educate young people about the value of internal motivation. The intention is to prompt and develop within youth a desire to become responsible and self-disciplined and to put forth effort to learn. The most significant characteristics of DWS are that it is totally noncoercive (but not permissive) and takes the opposite approach to Skinnerian behaviorism that relies on external sources for reinforcement. According to Marvin Marshall's book, there are three principles to practice. The first principle is 'Positivity', where he explains that "Teachers [should be] practic[ing] changing negatives into positives. "No running" becomes "We walk in the hallways." "Stop talking" becomes "This is quiet time." The second principle as described by Marvin Marshall is 'Choice', and he says, "Choice-response thinking is taught—as well as impulse control—so students are not victims of their own impulses." The third principle is 'Reflection', "[because] a person can only control another person temporarily and because no one can actually change another person, asking REFLECTIVE questions is the most effective approach for actuating change in others."

=== Provide flexible learning goals ===
Instructors can demonstrate a suitable level of strength by giving clear learning objectives, they can also pass on fitting levels of participation by giving learning objectives that can be changed based on the classes needs. Allowing students to participate in their own learning goals and outcomes at the start of a unit brings a sense of cooperation and mutual understanding between the instructor and student. One way of involving the students and in turn making them feel heard in the decision making of the class is by asking what topics they would find most intriguing in learning based on a guided rubric. This approach will engage and send a message to the students that the teacher is interested in the student's interests. The student in turn will bring greater learning outcomes as well as a mutual respect. Posting appropriate learning objectives where the students can see them and refer to them is vital in carrying out the objectives. Make learning goals clear and not a mystery. Students who do not know what the teacher wants them to do are unlikely to learn the material and understand what is being taught. When the teacher also clearly knows the goal the lesson will progress more smoothly and they can work every student toward that central goal.

=== The Good Behavior Game ===
The Good Behavior Game is a "classroom-level approach to behavior management" that was originally used in 1969 by Barrish, Saunders, and Wolf. The Game entails the class earning access to a reward or losing a reward, given that all members of the class engage in some type of behavior (or did not exceed a certain amount of undesired behavior). The GBG can be used to increase desired behaviors (e.g., question asking) or to decrease undesired behaviors (e.g., out of seat behavior). The GBG has been used with preschoolers as well as adolescents, however most applications have been used with typically developing students (i.e., those without developmental disabilities). In addition, the Game "is usually popular with and acceptable to students and teachers."

=== Positive classrooms ===
Robert DiGiulio has developed what he calls "positive classrooms". DiGiulio sees positive classroom management as the result of four factors: how teachers regard their students (spiritual dimension), how they set up the classroom environment (physical dimension), how skillfully they teach content (instructional dimension), and how well they address student behavior (managerial dimension). In positive classrooms student participation and collaboration are encouraged in a safe environment that has been created. A positive classroom environment can be encouraged by being consistent with expectations, using students' names, providing choices when possible, and having an overall trust in students. So As educators, we have daily opportunities to help students grow confidence and feel good about themselves. Despite all the negativity that may be around them within their households. Through such actions as boosting their self-esteem through praise, helping them work through any feelings of alienation, depression, and anger, and helping them realize and honor their intrinsic worth as human beings. May result in better behavior in the long line jeopardy of the students.

Preventive approaches to classroom management involve creating a positive classroom community with mutual respect between teacher and student. Teachers using the preventive approach offer warmth, acceptance, and support unconditionally – not based on a student's behavior. Fair rules and consequences are established and students are given frequent and consistent feedback regarding their behavior. One way to establish this kind of classroom environment is through the development and use of a classroom contract. The contract should be created by both students and the teacher. In the contract, students and teachers decide and agree on how to treat one another in the classroom. The group also decides on and agrees to what the group will do if someone violates the contract. Rather than a consequence, the group should decide how to fix the problem through either class discussion, peer mediation, counseling, or by one-on-one conversations leading to a solution to the situation.

=== Corporal punishment ===
Until recently, corporal punishment was widely used as a means of controlling disruptive behavior but it is now illegal in most schools. It is still advocated in some contexts by religious leaders such as James Dobson, but his views "diverge sharply from those recommended by contemporary mainstream experts" and are not based on empirical testing, but rather are a reflection of his faith-based beliefs.

According to studies, taboo physical punishments like spanking or procedures used in Asia in the classroom such as standing, do not make students or children more aggressive. Consistency seems to play a greater role on whether outcomes could be negative.

Corporal punishment is now banned in most schools in the United States, and in most developed countries. Although its effectiveness was never proven, the punishment was very disproportionately met. African American males were the most punished group. In a study conducted in 2006, 17.1 percent of students who experienced corporal punishment were African Americans, and 78.3 percent of total students were males.

== As a process ==
In the Handbook of Classroom Management: Research Practice and Contemporary Issues (2006), Evertson and Weinstein characterize classroom management as the actions taken to create an environment that supports and facilitates academic and social–emotional learning. Toward this goal, teachers must:

1. develop caring, supportive relationships with and among students
2. organize and implement instruction in ways that optimize students' access to learning
3. use group management methods that encourage students' engagement in academic tasks
4. promote the development of students' social skills and self–regulation
5. use appropriate interventions to assist students with behavior problems.

== As time management ==
In their introductory text on teaching, Kauchak and Eggen (2008) explain classroom management in terms of time management. The goal of classroom management, to Kauchak and Eggen, is to not only maintain order but to optimize student learning. They divide class time into four overlapping categories, namely allocated time, instructional time, engaged time, and academic learning time.

=== Academic learning time ===
Academic learning time occurs when students participate actively and are successful in learning activities. Effective classroom management maximizes academic learning time.

=== Allocated time ===
Allocated time is the total time allotted for teaching, learning, routine classroom procedures, checking attendance, and posting or delivering announcements.

Allocated time is also what appears on each student's schedule, for example "Introductory Algebra: 9:50–10:30 a.m." or "Fine Arts 1:15–2:00 p.m."

=== Engaged time ===
Engaged time is also called time on task. During engaged time, students are participating actively in learning activities—asking and responding to questions, completing worksheets and exercises, preparing skits and presentations, etc. This is an important part of the school day because when students are engaged (actively) they are learning.

=== Instructional time ===
Instructional time is what remains after routine classroom procedures are completed. That is to say, instructional time is the time wherein teaching and learning actually takes place. Teachers may spend two or three minutes taking attendance, for example, before their instruction begins. The time it takes for the teacher to do routine tasks can severely limit classroom instruction. Teachers must get a handle on classroom management to be effective.

== Common mistakes ==
In an effort to maintain order in the classroom, teachers can be mindful of the specific methods of classroom management that they apply with their particular group of students and consider how they will respond when certain strategies are implemented in the classroom. Teachers can consider the ways in which each strategy is able to be best integrated into their instruction in order to avoid potential conflicts or negative student responses. A common error made by teachers is to define the problem behavior by how it looks without considering its function. By considering how students might respond to specific methods of classroom management, teachers can plan which strategies will be the most successful when used with their particular students.

Interventions are more likely to be effective when they are individualized to address the specific function of the problem behavior. Two students with similar looking misbehavior may require entirely different intervention strategies if the behaviors are serving different functions. Teachers need to understand that they need to be able to change the ways they do things from year to year, as the children change. Not every approach works for every child. Teachers need to learn to be flexible. Another common mistake is for the teacher to become increasingly frustrated and negative when an approach is not working.

The teacher may raise his or her voice or increase adverse consequences in an effort to make the approach work. This type of interaction may impair the teacher-student relationship. Instead of allowing this to happen, it is often better to simply try a new approach.

Inconsistency in expectations and consequences is an additional mistake that can lead to dysfunction in the classroom. Teachers must be consistent in their expectations and consequences to help ensure that students understand that rules will be enforced. To avoid this, teachers should communicate expectations to students clearly and be sufficiently committed to the classroom management procedures to enforce them consistently.

"Ignoring and approving" is an effective classroom management strategy. This involves ignoring students when they behave undesirably and approving their behavior when it is desirable. When students are praised for their good behavior but ignored for their bad behavior, this may increase the frequency of good behavior and decrease bad behavior. Student behavior may be maintained by attention; if students have a history of getting attention after misbehavior, they may continue this behavior as long as it continues to get attention. If student misbehavior is ignored, but good behavior results in attention, students may instead behave appropriately to acquire attention. There are however also studies showing that ignoring problematic student behavior, such as bullying other students, can be perceived as tacit approval by the perpetrators and might exacerbate their behavior.

== See also ==
- Behavior management
- Behavioral engineering
- Child development
- Course evaluation
- Delaney card
- Educational psychology
- Summative assessment
- Staffroom
- School discipline
