= Misbehaving =

Misbehaving may refer to:

- Misbehaving: The Making of Behavioral Economics, a book by the economist Richard Thaler
- "Misbehaving" (song), a song by Labrinth
- Misbehavin', a 1988 album by Joanna Dean
- "Misbehavin'", a song by Pentatonix from Pentatonix (album)
- "Misbehavin'", song by Thalía from Thalía (English-language album)
