= MISBHV =

Polish fashion label

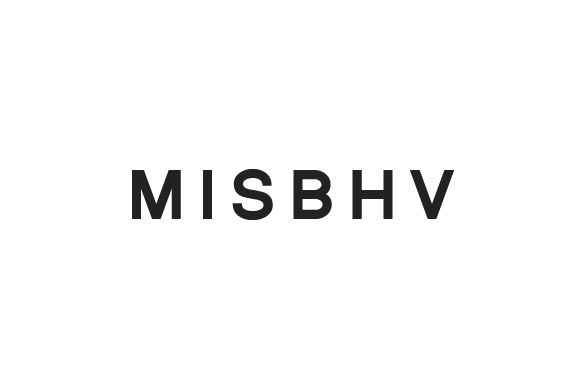
- Industry: Fashion
- Founded: 2007; 19 years ago
- Founder: Natalia Maczek, Katarzyna Kotnowska
- Successor: Martyna Kołtun
- Headquarters: Kraków, Poland
- Area served: Worldwide
- Owner: Martyna Kołtun
- Website: misbhv.com

MISBHV (pronounced "misbehave") is a Polish streetwear label established by Natalia Maczek in 2014. It is based in Kraków and has around 90 retailers worldwide.

== Background and history ==
In 2008, Natalia Maczek was studying law at the Jagiellonian University in Kraków. Maczek discovered fashion during a stay in London where she worked a few summer jobs. Back in Poland, she launched a side project along with her partner Tomek Wirski, a DJ. The two started making fake designer t-shirts for their friends to wear at clubs.

In January 2015, Maczek and Wirski gave their first fashion show at a tiny showroom in Paris. Some of their first customers were MARGIELA, GR8, Antonioli and BROWNS. Later that year, MISBHV was included in New York Fashion Week, where it debuted its Spring/Summer 2017 collection, inspired by David Bowie who had died earlier that year, with quotes from his 70s songs scattered across many products from t-shirts to leather jackets.

In the same year, Rihanna wore a Matrix-black MISBHV jacket during a performance in London.

MISBHV put together its first runway presentation, "Polish Jazz", at Warsaw's Palace of Culture and Science to debut its Spring/Summer 2019 collection. For the show, Maczek and Wirski paid tribute to Poland, referencing 1966 Warsaw poster art and collaborating with Polish artist Roslaw Szaybo.

The name "MISBHV" is inspired by a record store Maczek used to visit when she was eighteen.

== Influences ==
Emerging from Warsaw's techno-punk scene, Maczek and Thomas were always interested in exploring the intersection of fashion and the underground, with music playing a key role in every creative endeavor. The brand's aesthetic is rooted in the hip-hop and club scenes of post-socialist Poland, and infused with a DIY sensibility The duo cite a European perspective on rave and club culture, memories of their youth in post-socialist Poland, the disco trend of the 1990s and the raw style of motorcyclists.

The duo are inspired by multiple artists including the early works of Jean Arp when creating their signature camouflage, Andy Warhol when working on prints, and the color palette of Paul Cézanne.

== Pop culture ==
In 2020, MISBHV was the first fashion label featured on Grand Theft Auto.

The same year MISBHV was feature in the long fashion story of the Pavillon des Drapiers / Showroom Paris, a fashion landmark in Paris.

== Copyright infringement ==
In 2018, the brand faced its first case of copyright infringement involving the 'Motel Mirage' bag, which featured sweatshirts and bags depicting couples engaged in sexual activities. The notable infringement was the use of the cover art from the American band Sleep Chamber's 1985 album "Submit to Desire" from 1985.

A year later, the exact same thing happens. Another cover of an old album lands on MISBHV T-shirts. This time it's about Lovehunterby Whitesnake from 1979.

In October 2020, yet another copyright claim emerged against MISBHV. A photographer residing in Shanghai, using the pseudonym Hqeivy, discovered that the company unlawfully utilized his photograph of a girl's face, taken four years prior, as one of their prints.

Further attention was drawn to the brand when a logo resembling that of Apex Twin was found on one of their t-shirts.
